= Katie Lam =

British politician (born 1991)

Katie Lam MP
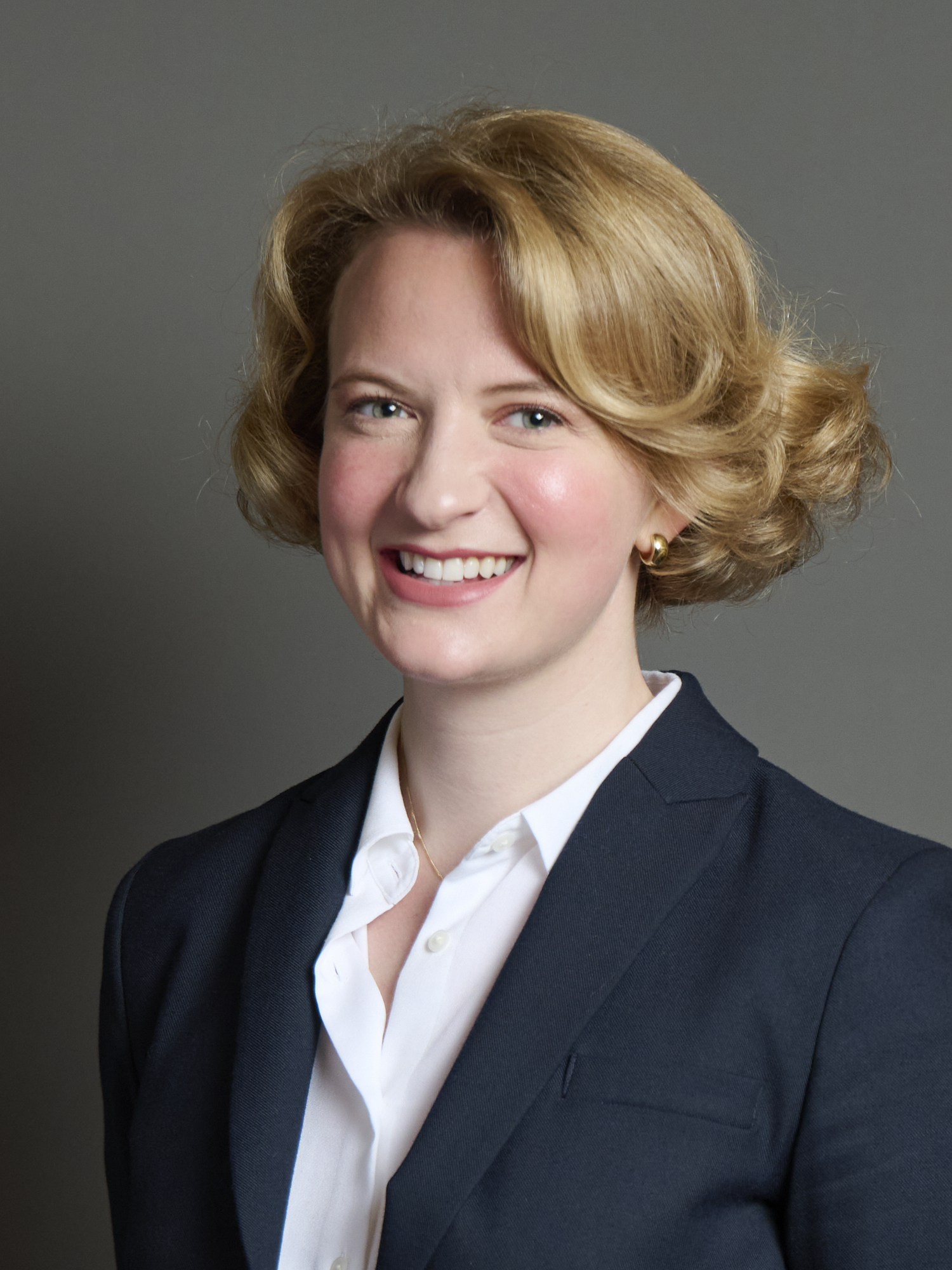
- Official portrait, 2024

Shadow Secretary of State for Housing, Communities and Local Government
- Incumbent
- Assumed office 31 August 2026
- Leader: Kemi Badenoch
- Preceded by: James Cleverly

Opposition Assistant Whip
- Incumbent
- Assumed office 18 November 2024

Member of Parliament for Weald of Kent
- Incumbent
- Assumed office 4 July 2024
- Preceded by: Constituency established
- Majority: 8,422 (16.6%)

Downing Street Deputy Chief of Staff
- In office 2019 – 12 March 2021 Serving with Cleo Watson (2019–2020), Henry Cook (2020–2021) and The Baroness Finn (from 2021)
- Prime Minister: Boris Johnson
- Chief of Staff: Dominic Cummings (de-facto); Edward Lister (acting); Dan Rosenfield
- Preceded by: Joanna Penn
- Succeeded by: Benjamin Gascoigne

Personal details
- Born: August 1991 (age 35)
- Party: Conservative
- Education: Guildford County School; Trinity College, Cambridge

Katie Jane Lotte Lam (born August 1991) is a British Conservative politician who has been Member of Parliament for Weald of Kent since 2024 and Shadow Secretary of State for Housing, Communities and Local Government since 2026.

== Early life ==
The daughter of Stephen Lam and his wife Mary Delahunty, Lam's maternal family is of Irish Catholic origin. Lam's paternal grandfather's family is of Dutch Jewish descent and her paternal grandmother's family were from Germany and included a left-wing senator representing Saxony in Germany. Her grandmother and her family moved as refugees to England to escape political persecution. Most of her grandfather's family was killed in the Holocaust. Her father's parents Martin Lam and Lisa Lorenz met while delivering leaflets for the Labour Party in the 1940s and were married at Hendon in 1953.

Lam was educated at her local comprehensive, Guildford County School, where she was head girl. The school did not teach Latin or Greek past a certain level, so she learned those independently, going on to study classics at Trinity College, Cambridge.

While at Cambridge she was elected president of the Cambridge Union and chairman of the Cambridge University Conservative Association. As president of the Union she was criticised by women's groups for inviting Dominique Strauss-Kahn after he had resigned after being accused of sexual assault. She defended the decision saying "He hasn't been found guilty of anything and it's not up to us to judge him."

== Early career ==
After graduation, Lam worked at Goldman Sachs for six years, 2013 to 2019, and became one of its vice-presidents.

She was a special adviser to Boris Johnson from 2019 to 2021, having been appointed after meeting Andrew Griffith at the Conservative Party conference. Working as Johnson's deputy Chief of Staff she became known for her work ethic and regularly slept at her desk during the COVID-19 pandemic. She left the Johnson administration in early 2021. She joined PR company Portland Communications as chief policy adviser in September 2021, remaining until 2022, and then worked as chief of staff at AI company Faculty.

She then worked on Rishi Sunak's first leadership campaign. She was also a special adviser to Home Secretary Suella Braverman and Alok Sharma. Whilst working for Braverman, she had a primary focus on national security, was a Brexit supporter and was known for supporting the UK leaving the European Convention on Human Rights.

== Parliamentary career ==
Lam was selected for the new seat of Weald of Kent in September 2023 ahead of the 2024 election. She won the seat with 39.8% of the vote, a majority of 8,422.

In the 2024 Conservative Party leadership election, she supported Robert Jenrick. Kemi Badenoch appointed her as a junior whip and a shadow Home Officer minister. According to The Guardian in 2025 she is a "rising star" in the Conservative Party, tipped as a future leader. At the Margaret Thatcher Conference, held in March 2025, Lam said that the Conservative Party should end its "obsession" with Thatcher, saying that while Thatcher "correctly diagnosed" issues about the state of the world, it does not "help or serve" the party in 2025.

Lam described the grooming gangs scandal as "the greatest stain on this country in the 20th and 21st centuries". In April 2025, she gave a speech in the Commons in which she read out graphic sentencing comments made by Judge Peter Rook to highlight the experiences of gang rape victims. The speech went down badly with those Labour and Liberal Democrat MPs in the mostly empty chamber, but went viral on social media.

In October 2025, in an interview with The Sunday Times, Lam stated, discussing the then Conservative Policy on revoking Indefinite Leave to Remain, “There are also a large number of people in this country who came here legally, but in effect shouldn’t have been able to do so. It’s not the fault of the individuals who came here, they just shouldn’t have been able to do so. They will also need to go home.” She added: “What that will leave is a mostly but not entirely culturally coherent group of people.” These comments built on a bill she and other Conservative MPs (including Chris Philp) tabled in Parliament on May 6 2025, which was revoked soon after her comments.

The comments were strongly condemned by Liberal Democrat leader Ed Davey in a letter to the Conservative Party leader Kemi Badenoch. Badenoch's spokesperson said that Lam's views were "broadly in line" with Conservative policy.

Later, on 30 October, Badenoch clarified that Lam had spoken 'imprecisely'. This followed several Conservative MPs privately criticising Lam's remarks and complaining to the party whips. The Party policy was changed; Lam retained her Shadow ministerial position despite calls from Liberal Democrats Home Affairs spokesperson Max Wilkinson to dismiss her.

== Musical career ==
In collaboration with Alex Parker, Lam has co-written five musicals, including an adaptation of The Railway Children.

== Personal life ==
Lam is a practising Christian. As of October 2025, she had a long-term boyfriend who is "not a public person."

Parliament of the United Kingdom
New constituency	Member of Parliament for Weald of Kent; 2024–present	Incumbent
