= David Canzini =

Political advisor and agent

David Canzini OBE

Downing Street Deputy Chief of Staff
- In office 2022–2022 Serving with The Baroness Finn; Ben Gascoigne
- Prime Minister: Boris Johnson
- Preceded by: Henry Cook; Katie Lam
- Succeeded by: Ruth Porter

Personal details
- Born: David Bruno John Canzini; March 1964 (age 62) Kenya
- Spouse: Victoria
- Children: 3
- Education: Woodbridge School

David Bruno John Canzini OBE (born March 1964) is a political advisor who worked for the former British prime minister, Liz Truss. He formerly worked in the office of Prime Minister Boris Johnson, assisting the Downing Street chief of staff, Steve Barclay, as his deputy.

Canzini worked for the Conservative Party as an election agent and campaign director, before joining Lynton Crosby's consultancy CTF Partners. Canzini worked in Johnson's office, assisting Barclay, the Downing Street chief of staff, as his deputy. In October 2022 he joined Truss's political team in 10 Downing Street.

== Early life ==
David Bruno John Canzini was born in Kenya in March 1964 to Frank and Helen Canzini. His father, the chief engineer for East African Airways in Kenya, died in 1972. His mother, who was from Harrogate, returned to the UK where she became a Conservative councillor in Suffolk. He went to Woodbridge School, supported by a bursary, and finished his education at the age of sixteen.

== Career ==
He started training as a manager for Debenhams but was soon recruited as an election agent by the member of Parliament for South Derbyshire, Edwina Currie, who he impressed as keen and smart, "a tidy man... very focused, absolutely on the job, very shrewd, very easy to deal with..."

He next worked for Jackson Carlaw, becoming the director of campaigns for the Scottish Conservative Party, where he was successful as the party gained two seats in the 1992 election, exceeding expectations. "David was at the heart of ensuring that we had a national campaign strategy and fought those elections effectively".

He then worked in Conservative Central Office as Director of Campaigning for the elections of 2001 and 2005, led by William Hague and Michael Howard, which were not successful. He then campaigned for David Davis as the next party leader. When this leadership campaign failed, he left to join CTF Partners – the political consultancy led by Lynton Crosby. He supported the Vote Leave campaign for Brexit and was implicated with involvement in a social media campaigns using multiple 'sock puppet' accounts to support Johnson's "Chuck Chequers" rebellion.

In 2022, he was recruited into the office of Boris Johnson, who was then prime minister. There he joined Simone Finn and Ben Gascoigne as a deputy chief of staff, under the Downing Street chief of staff, Steve Barclay. Crosby, his previous employer, has a political strategy to "get the barnacles off the boat" by focusing on conservative wedge issues and discarding other non-core policies.

In October 2022 Canzini joined Prime Minister Liz Truss's political team in 10 Downing Street.

Opinions of him vary. He has a reputation as a hard man but his friend, Iain Dale, said that he is actually, "not someone who shouts and screams; he is very quietly spoken... he's quite camp in a way". Other sources describe him as combative with unearthed tweets revealing that he repeatedly described the NHS as 's***e'.

== Personal life ==
He has been married three times. His second marriage was to Victoria while campaigning in Scotland and they have a son. He later remarried Vanesa and has two further children. He is an ABBA fan.

He was appointed an officer of the Order of the British Empire in the 2022 Prime Minister's Resignation Honours for political and public service.
