= Klute (nightclub) =

Nightclub in Durham, England

- Interactive map of Klute
- Address: Elvet Bridge; Durham; England
- Coordinates: 54.776002°N 1.573963°W
- Owner: Tokyo Industries (from 2013)
- Type: Nightclub

Construction
- Opened: Early 1970s
- Closed: April 2024 (temporary closure; re-opened later in 2024)

Website
- "Klute Durham – Official Website". Klute Durham.

Klute is a nightclub located on Elvet Bridge in Durham, County Durham, England. It is one of the city's best-known nightlife venues, particularly among students of Durham University. The club developed a reputation for its inexpensive drinks and prominent place in local student culture.

== History ==
Klute opened in 1971, and was owned by the family of Dominic Cummings, who later became adviser to Boris Johnson; Dominic Cummings once collected money on the door of Klute. The venue was named after the 1971 film of the same name. It is closely associated with student nightlife in Durham.

In the 1990s, FHM ranked Klute among the "worst nightclubs in Europe", a label that became part of its public identity and local folklore.

In 2013, Klute was acquired by Tokyo Industries, a UK-based bar and nightclub operator.

In April 2024, Klute temporarily closed. In October 2024, the venue announced a limited reopening for selected events.

== Reputation ==
Klute is known for its student clientele and themed music nights featuring mainstream pop and "cheesy" music. A signature drink previously associated with the venue was the "quaddie", typically consisting of multiple measures of vodka with mixer.
