= Simone Finn, Baroness Finn =

British businesswoman and peer

The Right Honourable The Baroness Finn
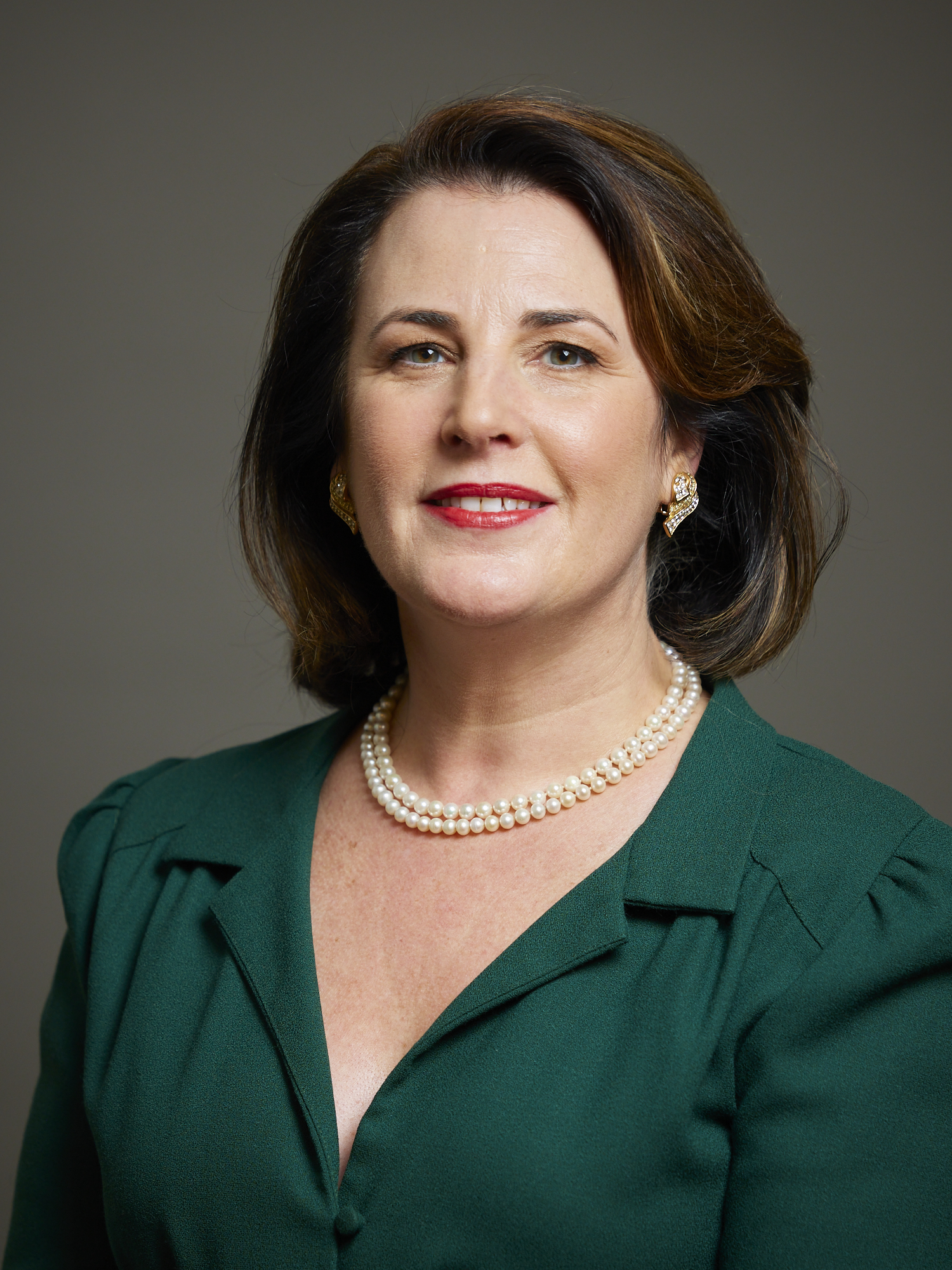
- Official portrait, 2024

Shadow Minister of State at the Cabinet Office
- Incumbent
- Assumed office 11 November 2024
- Leader: Kemi Badenoch
- Preceded by: The Baroness Neville-Rolfe

Downing Street Chief of Staff
- De facto 5 July 2022 – 6 September 2022
- Prime Minister: Boris Johnson
- Preceded by: Steve Barclay
- Succeeded by: Mark Fullbrook

Downing Street Deputy Chief of Staff
- In office 13 February 2021 – 6 September 2022 Serving with Ben Gascoigne (2021–2022); David Canzini (2022)
- Prime Minister: Boris Johnson
- Preceded by: Henry Cook; Katie Lam
- Succeeded by: Ruth Porter

Member of the House of Lords
- Lord Temporal
- Life peerage 14 October 2015

Personal details
- Born: Simone Jari Kubes; 10 June 1968 (age 58) United States
- Party: Conservative
- Spouse: Alex Finn
- Children: 2
- Education: Lady Margaret Hall, Oxford

Simone Jari Finn, Baroness Finn (née Kubes; born 10 June 1968), is a British-American businesswoman and Conservative politician who served as Downing Street Deputy Chief of Staff from February 2021 until the end of the second Johnson Ministry. She has been Shadow Minister for the Cabinet Office since November 2024.

A member of the House of Lords since 2015, she is a former government adviser on industrial relations, efficiency and civil service reform. She co-founded Francis Maude Associates, a consultancy firm specialising in government efficiency. She was appointed a non-executive board member for the Cabinet Office in May 2020.

== Early life and education ==
Simone Kubes was born in the US to a Welsh mother and a father who had defected from Communist Czechoslovakia. She grew up in Swansea and attended her local comprehensive school. She graduated from Lady Margaret Hall, Oxford University, with a degree in history. Being born in the U.S. to non-diplomats, Finn has birthright citizenship of the United States, and inherited her mother's British nationality.

== Career ==
Following university Finn trained and worked as an accountant at Coopers & Lybrand (subsequently PwC). She then joined the Financial Services Authority as a senior accountant regulating insurance companies.

Recruited before the 2010 election by the Conservative Party's Implementation Team, Finn became the Coalition Government's industrial relations adviser. She played a key role in negotiations with the trade unions and helped to agree deals to roughly halve the cost of public sector pensions. The Telegraph described her as the "silk-and-steel adviser behind the Coalition's trade union reforms".

As a special adviser to Francis Maude, the minister for the Cabinet Office, Finn helped to drive through his cuts of several billion pounds over the course of the 2010-2015 parliament. Finn also helped to set up the Centre for Public Appointments in the Cabinet Office and publish a diversity strategy to encourage more women to apply for public appointments. The proportion of women appointed to the boards of public bodies reached 48.2% in 2015–16 compared with 34.7% in 2009–10.

In July 2022, the resignation of Sajid Javid during the July 2022 United Kingdom government crisis caused a vacancy in the office of Secretary of State for Health and Social Care, which Downing Street chief of staff Steve Barclay was appointed to fill shortly before Boris Johnson's resignation as prime minister. While no successor to Barclay was formally appointed, Finn held the role in a de facto capacity, as incumbent Downing Street deputy chief of staff.

=== Political candidate ===
In the run up to the 2015 general election, Finn was considered as a Conservative candidate for the Kensington constituency. The selected candidate, Victoria Borwick, won the seat, but lost it to the Labour Party in the 2017 election.

In 2018, Finn was included on the longlist for the Conservative Party London mayoral candidate. Shaun Bailey was selected as the final candidate.

=== Elevation to the Lords ===
In the 2015 Dissolution Honours Finn was elevated to the Lords as Baroness Finn, of Swansea in the County of West Glamorgan. In her maiden speech in the House of Lords, Finn focused on the importance of education as a tool of social mobility, paying tribute to her former deputy headmistress, Iris Williams. She also voiced her support for the Tidal Lagoon Swansea Bay, a project for which she has repeatedly advocated.

Finn is a member of the EU Security and Justice Sub-Committee. She was previously a member of the Scrutiny of Secondary Legislation Select Committee, and the EU (External Affairs) Sub Committee. Finn was appointed to the Committee for Standards in Public Life by Boris Johnson.

Finn was appointed Shadow Minister for the Cabinet Office in November 2024 under Kemi Badenoch.

=== Career outside Parliament ===
Finn is the co-founder and managing director of Francis Maude Associates, which she runs with Lord (Francis) Maude of Horsham. It is a consulting firm specialising in government efficiency and reform, with its work based on Maude and Finn's experience in the Cabinet Office, 2010–15. She is also employed by Arbuthnot Latham, a bank owned by the former Conservative donor, Henry Angest.

Finn is a trustee of the think tank Demos and was visiting parliamentary fellow at St Anthony's, Oxford, 2017–18. She is also a board member of the Conservative Foundation.

In May 2020, Michael Gove, the minister for the Cabinet Office, appointed Finn as a non-executive board member for the Cabinet Office, serving on the audit and risk committee. On 13 February 2021 it was announced that Finn had been promoted to become Downing Street Deputy chief of staff under Dan Rosenfield.

== Personal life ==
Finn was formerly in a relationship with Michael Gove.

She is married to Alex Finn. They have two children.

Government offices
Preceded by Steve Barclay	Downing Street Chief of Staff; Acting; July 2022–September 2022	Succeeded by Mark Fullbrook
