= Lord Porter =

Lord Porter may refer to:

- Samuel Porter, Baron Porter (1877–1956), British judge
- George Porter, Baron Porter of Luddenham (1920–2002), British chemist and Nobel prize winner
- Gary Porter, Baron Porter of Spalding, British Conservative politician and Chair of the Local Government Association

== See also ==
- Ruth Porter, Baroness Porter of Fulwood, British special adviser and Conservative life peer
