= Kate Fall, Baroness Fall =

British political advisor (born 1967)

The Right Honourable The Baroness Fall MBE

Member of the House of Lords
- Lord Temporal
- Life peerage 22 October 2015

Personal details
- Born: 2 October 1967 (age 59)

Catherine (Kate) Susan Fall, Baroness Fall, MBE (born 2 October 1967) is a British peer and political advisor. She served as Deputy Chief of Staff for David Cameron when he was prime minister and became a life peer in September 2015. She now co-leads the geopolitical practice at the Brunswick Group, which specialises in financial communications, crisis management, and corporate relations.

== Early life ==
Born on 2 October 1967, Fall is the daughter of Sir Brian Fall, a former British Ambassador to the Union of Soviet Socialist Republics, and has an identical twin, Melanie. She was educated at Cobham Hall, Kent, King's School, Canterbury, and St Hilda's College, Oxford, where she met Cameron while both were studying Philosophy, Politics and Economics.

== Career ==
Fall worked at the Conservative Research Department and became one of the Notting Hill set. In 2001 she acted as Cameron's advisor for his first election campaign in the Oxfordshire parliamentary constituency of Witney. She also worked for a Conservative Member of the European Parliament and for the Confederation of British Industry. She then worked in Michael Howard's business liaison unit, during his leadership of the Conservative Party and of the Opposition, before becoming a director of The Atlantic Partnership, a charitable think-tank. She became Cameron's private office secretary after he was elected in 2005 to replace Howard as the Leader of the Conservative Party.

When Cameron became prime minister in May 2010, he appointed Conservative advisor Edward Llewellyn Downing Street Chief of Staff and created the role of Downing Street Deputy Chief of Staff, with responsibility for supporting the Chief of Staff, a position he gave to Fall, with a salary of £100,000. In 2011, Fall was ranked by the Evening Standard as one of the 100 most influential people in London. Briefed to keep Cameron "punctual and punctilious", by 2012 she had been nicknamed "The Gatekeeper". She was nominated for a life peerage in Cameron's Dissolution Honours List in August 2015, gazetted in September 2015. The next year she became a senior adviser to the Brunswick Group.

In the House of Lords, Fall has served variously on the Political Polling and Digital Media Committee (2017-2018), the International Relations and Defence Committee (2019-2023), and the National Security Strategy Joint Committee (2023-2026).

In March 2020, Fall published a memoir of her time in government, The Gatekeeper: Life at the Heart of Number 10. Writing in the Evening Standard, Julian Glover declared this to be the book of the week.

== Honours ==
On 22 October 2015, she was created Baroness Fall, of Ladbroke Grove in the Royal Borough of Kensington and Chelsea, for life.

Fall was appointed Member of the Order of the British Empire (MBE) in the 2024 New Year Honours for services to culture as a former non-executive director of the Cultural Recovery Board.

== Personal life ==
Having reportedly dated George Osborne in the early 1990s, Fall married Ralph Ward-Jackson, a businessman, in 1996. The couple subsequently divorced but have a daughter and a son.
