= Liam Booth-Smith, Baron Booth-Smith =

British political adviser (born 1987)

The Right Honourable The Lord Booth-Smith
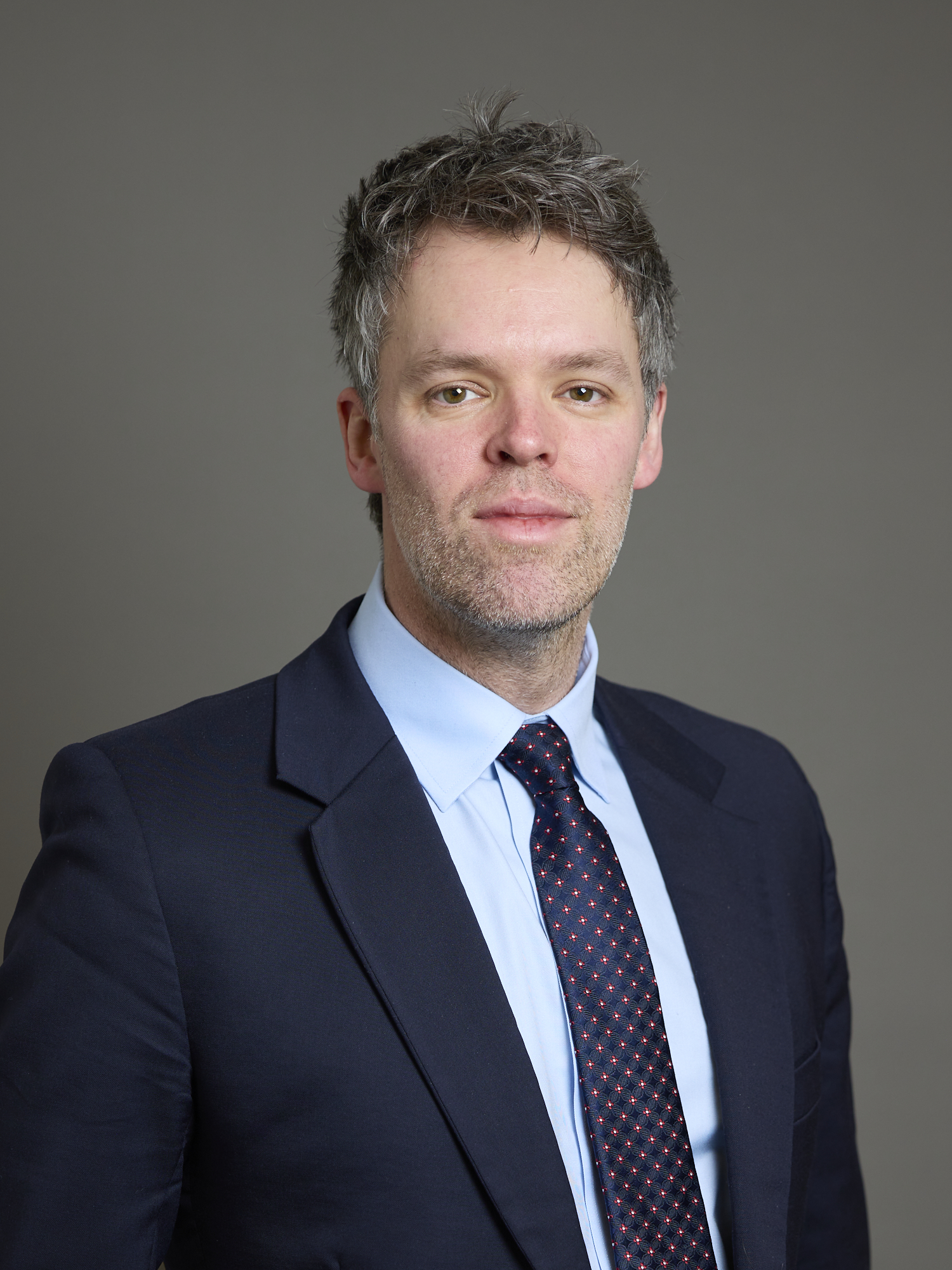
- Official portrait, 2025

Downing Street Chief of Staff
- In office 25 October 2022 – 5 July 2024
- Prime Minister: Rishi Sunak
- Preceded by: Mark Fullbrook
- Succeeded by: Sue Gray

Special Adviser to the Chancellor of the Exchequer
- In office February 2020 – July 2022
- Chancellor: Rishi Sunak

Special Adviser to the Prime Minister
- In office July 2019 – July 2020
- Prime Minister: Boris Johnson

Member of the House of Lords
- Lord Temporal
- Life peerage 21 August 2024

Personal details
- Born: Liam David Scott-Smith; 1986 (age 39–40) Stoke-on-Trent, England
- Party: Conservative
- Spouse: Olivia Oates (m. 2022)
- Children: 2
- Education: Loughborough University

Liam David Scott Booth-Smith, Baron Booth-Smith (born 1987), is a British political adviser who was Downing Street Chief of Staff under Prime Minister Rishi Sunak from October 2022 to July 2024. He previously was Sunak's de facto chief of staff as head of the Joint Economic Unit during his chancellorship.

== Early life and education ==
Liam was born Liam Scott-Smith in 1986 in Stoke-on-Trent and was raised by his mother Lisa, a single parent who lived on a council estate in north Staffordshire, as the eldest of three children.

Booth-Smith received funding to attend Newcastle-under-Lyme School under the Assisted Places Scheme to help bright students enter elite schools. After the scheme was discontinued in 1997, he attended the state-funded Stoke-on-Trent Sixth Form College. He read politics and social policy at Loughborough University, where he also played cricket.

== Career ==
After a role as the head of communications and research at the public sector consultancy IMPOWER Consulting, Booth-Smith was chief executive of the think tank Localis between 2016 and 2018, before being as a special adviser to James Brokenshire as Secretary of State for Housing, Communities and Local Government from 2018 to 2019, where Rishi Sunak was a junior minister. In July 2019, Booth-Smith became a senior adviser to prime minister Boris Johnson upon his accession as prime minister. He had previously worked at the think tank Policy Exchange, specialising in housing policy.

In February 2020, as head of the Joint Economic Unit between 10 Downing Street and 11 Downing Street, Booth-Smith became the de facto chief of staff to Sunak, who was then Chancellor of the Exchequer, overseeing the Treasury's response to the COVID-19 pandemic in the United Kingdom. Booth-Smith gained the nickname "Travolta of the Treasury" for wearing a leather jacket with his shirt buttons undone.

Booth-Smith led Sunak's leadership campaign during the July–September 2022 Conservative Party leadership election, and again in the subsequent October 2022 Conservative Party leadership election.

=== Downing Street Chief of Staff ===
Booth-Smith was appointed as Downing Street Chief of Staff in October 2022 after Sunak became prime minister. He succeeded Mark Fullbrook, who was chief of staff to Liz Truss.

In 2023, the New Statesman named Booth-Smith as the ninth-most influential figure in British right-wing politics.

He was paid between £140,000 and £145,000 per year.

=== Private sector ===
In June 2025, Booth-Smith joined the AI firm Anthropic as chief of external affairs. Upon his appointment, the Advisory Committee on Business Appointments required him not to lobby or use privileged government information for two years, imposing strict limits on his communication with the UK government, so as to prevent undue influence given his prior senior government role.

== Peerage ==
Booth-Smith was nominated for a life peerage in the 2024 Dissolution Honours. He was created Baron Booth-Smith, of Newcastle-under-Lyme in the County of Staffordshire, on 21 August 2024.

== Personal life ==
He married Olivia Oates in 2022. Oates was a special adviser to Simon Clarke as a junior minister to Sunak at the Treasury, and previously a special adviser to Robert Jenrick as housing secretary. He has two children.

Orders of precedence in the United Kingdom
Preceded by The Lord Grayling	Gentlemen; Baron Booth-Smith	Followed by The Lord Mackinlay of Richborough
