= 2015 Dissolution Honours =

British government recognitions

Prime Minister David Cameron pictured in 2010

The 2015 Dissolution Honours List was issued on 27 August 2015 upon the advice of the prime minister, David Cameron. The Life Peerages were announced separately from the other appointments, while it was gazetted as a single list on 22 September 2015.

== Life Peerages ==
=== Conservative Party ===
- Rt Hon. James Arbuthnot, to be Baron Arbuthnot of Edrom, of Edrom in the County of Berwick
- Rt Hon. Gregory Barker, to be Baron Barker of Battle, of Battle in the County of East Sussex
- Catherine Fall, to be Baroness Fall, of Ladbroke Grove in the Royal Borough of Kensington and Chelsea
- Simone Finn, to be Baroness Finn, of Swansea in the County of West Glamorgan
- Stephen Gilbert, to be Baron Gilbert of Panteg, of Panteg in the County of Monmouthshire
- Rt Hon. William Hague FRSL, to be Baron Hague of Richmond, of Richmond in the County of North Yorkshire
- Robert Hayward OBE, to be Baron Hayward, of Cumnor in the County of Oxfordshire
- Rt Hon. The Viscount Hailsham QC, to be Baron Hailsham of Kettlethorpe, of Kettlethorpe in the County of Lincolnshire
- Rt Hon. Andrew Lansley CBE, to be Baron Lansley, of Orwell in the County of Cambridgeshire
- James Lupton CBE, to be Baron Lupton, of Lovington in the County of Hampshire
- Ruby McGregor-Smith CBE, to be Baroness McGregor-Smith, of Sunninghill in the Royal County of Berkshire
- Anne McIntosh, to be Baroness McIntosh of Pickering, of the Vale of York in the County of North Yorkshire
- Michelle Mone OBE, to be Baroness Mone, of Mayfair in the City of Westminster
- James O'Shaughnessy, to be Baron O'Shaughnessy, of Maidenhead in the Royal County of Berkshire
- Emma Pidding CBE, to be Baroness Pidding, of Amersham in the County of Buckinghamshire
- Stuart Polak CBE, to be Baron Polak, of Hertsmere in the County of Hertfordshire
- Cllr Gary Porter, to be Baron Porter of Spalding, of Spalding in the County of Lincolnshire
- Cllr Liz Redfern, to be Baroness Redfern, of the Isle of Axholme in the County of Lincolnshire
- Rt Hon. Andrew Robathan, to be Baron Robathan, of Poultney in the County of Leicestershire
- Kate Rock, to be Baroness Rock, of Stratton in the County of Dorset
- Cllr Jane Scott OBE, to be Baroness Scott of Bybrook, of Upper Wraxall in the County of Wiltshire
- Kevin Shinkwin, to be Baron Shinkwin, of Balham in the London Borough of Wandsworth
- Philip Smith CBE, to be Baron Smith of Hindhead, of Hindhead in the County of Surrey
- Philippa Stroud, to be Baroness Stroud, of Fulham in the London Borough of Hammersmith and Fulham
- Rt Hon. David Willetts, to be Baron Willetts, of Havant in the County of Hampshire
- Rt Hon. Sir George Young Bt CH, to be Baron Young of Cookham, of Cookham in the Royal County of Berkshire

=== Liberal Democrats ===
- Rt Hon. Sir Alan James Beith, lately Member of Parliament for Berwick-upon-Tweed; Chairman of the Justice Select Committee, to be Baron Beith, of Berwick-upon-Tweed in the County of Northumberland
- Sharon Margaret Bowles, formerly Member of the European Parliament for South East England, 2005-2015, to be Baroness Bowles of Berkhamsted, of Bourne End in the County of Hertfordshire
- Rt Hon. Sir Malcolm Grey Bruce, lately Member of Parliament for Gordon; Deputy Leader of the Liberal Democrats, to be Baron Bruce of Bennachie, of Torphins in the County of Aberdeenshire
- Lorely Jane Burt, lately Member of Parliament for Solihull, and former Chairman of the Liberal Democrats, to be Baroness Burt of Solihull, of Solihull in the County of West Midlands
- Rt Hon. Sir Walter Menzies Campbell CH CBE QC, lately Member of Parliament for North East Fife; former Leader of the Liberal Democrats, to be Baron Campbell of Pittenweem, of Pittenweem in the County of Fife
- Rt Hon. Lynne Featherstone, lately Member of Parliament for Hornsey and Wood Green, and Minister of State at the Home Office, 2014-2015, to be Baroness Featherstone, of Highgate in the London Borough of Haringey
- Rt Hon. Donald Michael Ellison Foster, lately Member of Parliament for Bath; former Liberal Democrat Chief Whip, to be Baron Foster of Bath, of Bath in the County of Somerset
- Jonathan Oates, lately Chief of Staff to the Deputy Prime Minister in the Coalition Government, 2010-2015, to be Baron Oates, of Denby Grange in the County of West Yorkshire
- Shas Sheehan, formerly Councillor for Kew, to be Baroness Sheehan, of Wimbledon in the London Borough of Merton and of Tooting in the London Borough of Wandsworth
- Rt Hon. Sir Robert Andrew Stunell OBE, lately Member of Parliament for Hazel Grove; Under Secretary of State, Department for Communities and Local Government, 2010-2012, to be Baron Stunell, of Hazel Grove in the County of Greater Manchester
- Dorothy Thornhill MBE, Mayor of Watford. Formerly Councillor and Assistant Headteacher, to be Baroness Thornhill, of Watford in the County of Hertfordshire

=== Labour Party ===
- Rt Hon. David Blunkett, lately Member of Parliament for Sheffield Brightside and Hillsborough; former Home Secretary, 2001-2004. to be Baron Blunkett, of Brightside and Hillsborough in the City of Sheffield
- Rt Hon. Alistair Maclean Darling, lately Member of Parliament for Edinburgh South West; former Chancellor of the Exchequer, 2007-2010, to be Baron Darling of Roulanish, of Great Bernera in the County of Ross and Cromarty
- Rt Hon. Peter Gerald Hain, lately Member of Parliament for Neath; former Secretary of State for Wales, 2009-2010, to be Baron Hain, of Neath in the County of West Glamorgan
- Rt Hon. Dame Tessa Jane Jowell DBE, lately Member of Parliament for Dulwich and West Norwood and former Minister for the Olympics, 2005-2010, to be Baroness Jowell, of Brixton in the London Borough of Lambeth
- Spencer Livermore, senior Campaign Strategist for the Labour Party, to be Baron Livermore, of Rotherhithe in the London Borough of Southwark
- Rt Hon. Paul Peter Murphy, lately Member of Parliament for Torfaen; former Secretary of State for Wales, 2008- 2009, to be Baron Murphy of Torfaen, of Abersychan in the County of Gwent
- Rt Hon. Dame Dawn Primarolo DBE, lately Member of Parliament for Bristol South and Second Deputy Chairman of Ways and Means, to be Baroness Primarolo, of Windmill Hill in the City of Bristol
- David Leonard Watts, lately Member of Parliament for St Helens North; Chairman of the Parliamentary Labour Party, to be Baron Watts, of Ravenhead in the County of Merseyside

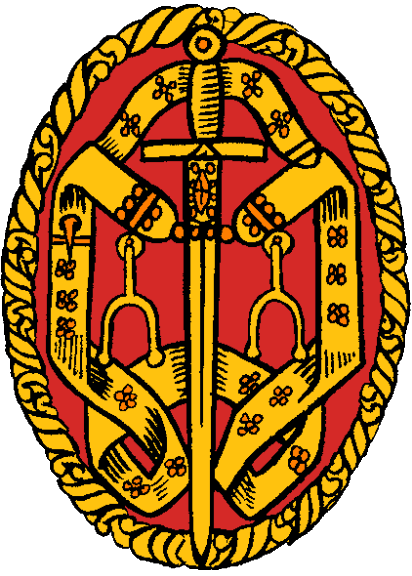
Insignia of a Knight Bachelor

== Knights Bachelor ==
- Rt Hon. Danny Alexander
- Rt Hon. Vince Cable
- Cllr Barry Norton, Honorary Alderman, West Oxfordshire District Council
- Anthony Ullman, Chairman & C.E.O., Shackletons Ltd.

== The Most Excellent Order of the British Empire ==
=== Dames Commander of the Order of the British Empire (DBE) ===
- Rt Hon. Annette Brooke OBE
- Philippa Harris
- Rt Hon. Lady Hodge MBE MP
- Glenis Willmott MEP

=== Commanders of the Order of the British Empire (CBE) ===
- Oliver Dowden MP
- Jean-Christophe Gray
- Duncan Greenland
- Rupert Harrison
- Laurence Mann
- Elizabeth Sugg
- Ian Wright

=== Officers of the Order of the British Empire (OBE) ===
- Caroline Balcon
- Ramesh Chhabra
- Denzil Davidson
- Richard Duncalf JP
- Clare Foges
- Ameetpal Gill
- Matthew Hanney
- Hilary Stephenson
- Benjamin Williams

=== Members of the Order of the British Empire (MBE) ===
- Margaret Binks
- Kate Marley
- Shaffaq Mohammed
- Lara Moreno-Pérez
- Lalini Phoolchand
- Steven Pooley
- Phillipa Rudkin
- Michael Salter
- Andrew Sangar
- Ian Sherwood

== British Empire Medal (BEM) ==
- Alison de Pass
- Paul Schooling
- Marjorie Wallace

== See also ==
- Dissolution of Parliament
- House of Lords
- Prime Minister of the United Kingdom
