= Dan Rosenfield =

British political advisor and civil servant (born 1977)

The Right Honourable The Lord Rosenfield
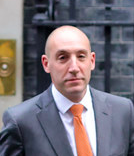
- Rosenfield in 2020

Downing Street Chief of Staff
- In office 1 January 2021 – 5 February 2022
- Prime Minister: Boris Johnson
- Deputy: The Baroness Finn
- Preceded by: Edward Lister
- Succeeded by: Steve Barclay

Principal Private Secretary to the Chancellor of the Exchequer
- In office July 2007 – April 2011
- Chancellor: Alistair Darling; George Osborne
- Preceded by: James Bowler
- Succeeded by: Beth Russell

Member of the House of Lords
- Lord Temporal
- Life peerage 13 July 2023

Personal details
- Born: Daniel Robert Rosenfield; 2 May 1977 (age 49) Manchester, England
- Party: Non-affiliated (since 2023)
- Spouse: Jessica Brummer
- Children: 3
- Education: Manchester Grammar School
- Alma mater: University College London

Daniel Robert Rosenfield, Baron Rosenfield (born 2 May 1977) is a British political adviser and civil servant who served as the Downing Street Chief of Staff from January 2021 to February 2022. Between July 2007 and April 2011, he served as the principal private secretary to chancellors Alistair Darling and George Osborne, and subsequently as a managing director for Bank of America Merrill Lynch.

== Early life and education ==
Dan Rosenfield was born in Manchester on 2 May 1977, and attended Manchester Grammar School from 1988 to 1995, where he studied maths, French and German at A-level. After school, he spent a year in Israel on a kibbutz. Rosenfield's family later moved to London, where they were members of the North Western Reform Synagogue. He later attended University College London, where he read modern European studies from 1996 to 2000, specialising in German and philosophy.

== Career ==
Rosenfield worked at HM Treasury from 2000 to 2011. In 2005 he was partly responsible for creating a budget for the 2012 London Olympics, after it was announced that London had won the bid.

From July 2007 to April 2011 he worked as principal private secretary to Chancellors Alistair Darling and George Osborne during and after the 2008 financial crisis.

Rosenfield then left public service to join Bank of America Merrill Lynch as a managing director in investment banking from June 2011 to March 2016. The bank subsequently bid for lucrative roles advising UK Financial Investments on the sale of Northern Rock, which had been the subject of oversight by the Treasury while Rosenfield had been in office. In April 2016 he became a partner at Hakluyt & Company, a corporate strategy adviser.

=== Downing Street Chief of staff ===
On 26 November 2020 Downing Street announced that Rosenfield had been appointed as the Downing Street Chief of Staff, and that he would formally take office on 1 January 2021. This followed the fallout caused by the resignations of key Boris Johnson advisers Lee Cain and Dominic Cummings, and the appointment of Edward Lister as the acting chief of staff. Although Johnson had not formally appointed a chief of staff since he became prime minister in July 2019, Cummings was noted to be the de facto chief of staff until his departure.

Shortly after his appointment, in April 2021, Rosenfield was implicated in a potential lobbying scandal in relation to the proposed European Super League of major football clubs. Rosenfield met with Manchester United chief executive Ed Woodward in Downing Street on 14 April, at the height of debate about the scheme and whether it would receive support from the government, apparently also introducing Woodward to Johnson at the meeting. Rosenfield reportedly told Woodward that Downing Street would not oppose the controversial plans, from which Manchester United and Woodward stood to benefit financially. Downing Street sources subsequently denied that the scheme was discussed at the meeting. Woodward had also allegedly tried to keep the meeting secret.

In July 2021 it was reported by The Times that Rosenfield's leadership was unpopular among some Downing Street staff members, including Nikki da Costa, the director of communications. There were suggestions that Rosenfield had failed to hold strategy meetings for political advisors for up to six months. It was additionally reported that Rosenfield did not frequently chair Downing Street staff meetings, despite his role as chief of staff, instead leaving them to his deputy Simone Finn.

It was reported in The Sunday Telegraph in January 2022 that Rosenfield had attended a cricket game three days before the Fall of Kabul, for which the UK government was criticised in its response. Downing Street did not deny the allegations but stated that "Dan was in constant contact with the office".

In December 2021 Downing Street denied speculation in a report in The Times that in December 2020 Rosenfield had attended a Christmas party in the office of Simon Case, the head of the Civil Service, when British public health restrictions as a result of the COVID-19 pandemic forbade such gatherings. Speculation arose that Rosenfield might be sacked by Johnson for his role in the controversy, amid further criticism that he had presided over a 'laddy' culture within Downing Street which had excluded female members of staff.

Rosenfield resigned as Downing Street chief of staff in February 2022 following the resignation of Munira Mirza during the Partygate scandal, with the intention of remaining in place until a successor is found. Two days later Steve Barclay was announced as the new chief of staff alongside Guto Harri as the new director of communications, replacing Jack Doyle.

For his services, Rosenfield was nominated by Johnson for a life peerage in the 2022 Prime Minister's Resignation Honours, and was created Baron Rosenfield, of Muswell Hill in the London Borough of Haringey, on 13 July 2023. He sits as a non-affiliated member of the House of Lords, a choice which was criticised by some Conservative MPs.

=== Other roles ===
Prior to taking up his Downing Street appointment, Rosenfield had been Chair of Trustees of World Jewish Relief from October 2016, having served as a trustee since 2013. Rosenfield stepped down as Chair in January 2021 and was succeeded by Maurice Helfgott. In 2022, Rosenfield took up a role at Centrica, and became non-executive Chairman of Windmill Hill Asset Management.

== Personal life ==
Rosenfield is married to Jessica Brummer and has three children: Rafi, Natasha and Benjamin. His father-in-law is Alex Brummer, a journalist for the Daily Mail. He is Jewish, and has described Judaism as being "central to his life". Rosenfield has been described as "an obsessive Manchester United fan."

Government offices
Preceded by James Bowler	Principal Private Secretary to the Chancellor of the Exchequer; 2007–2011	Succeeded by Beth Russell
Preceded by Edward Lister	Downing Street Chief of Staff; 2021–2022	Succeeded by Steve Barclay
Non-profit organization positions
Preceded by James Libson	Chair of Trustees of World Jewish Relief; 2016–2021	Succeeded by Maurice Helfgott
Orders of precedence in the United Kingdom
Preceded by Ben Houchen	Gentlemen; Baron Rosenfield	Followed by David Cameron
