= Downing Street Chief of Staff =

Most senior aide to the UK Prime Minister

- Royal Arms of His Majesty's Government

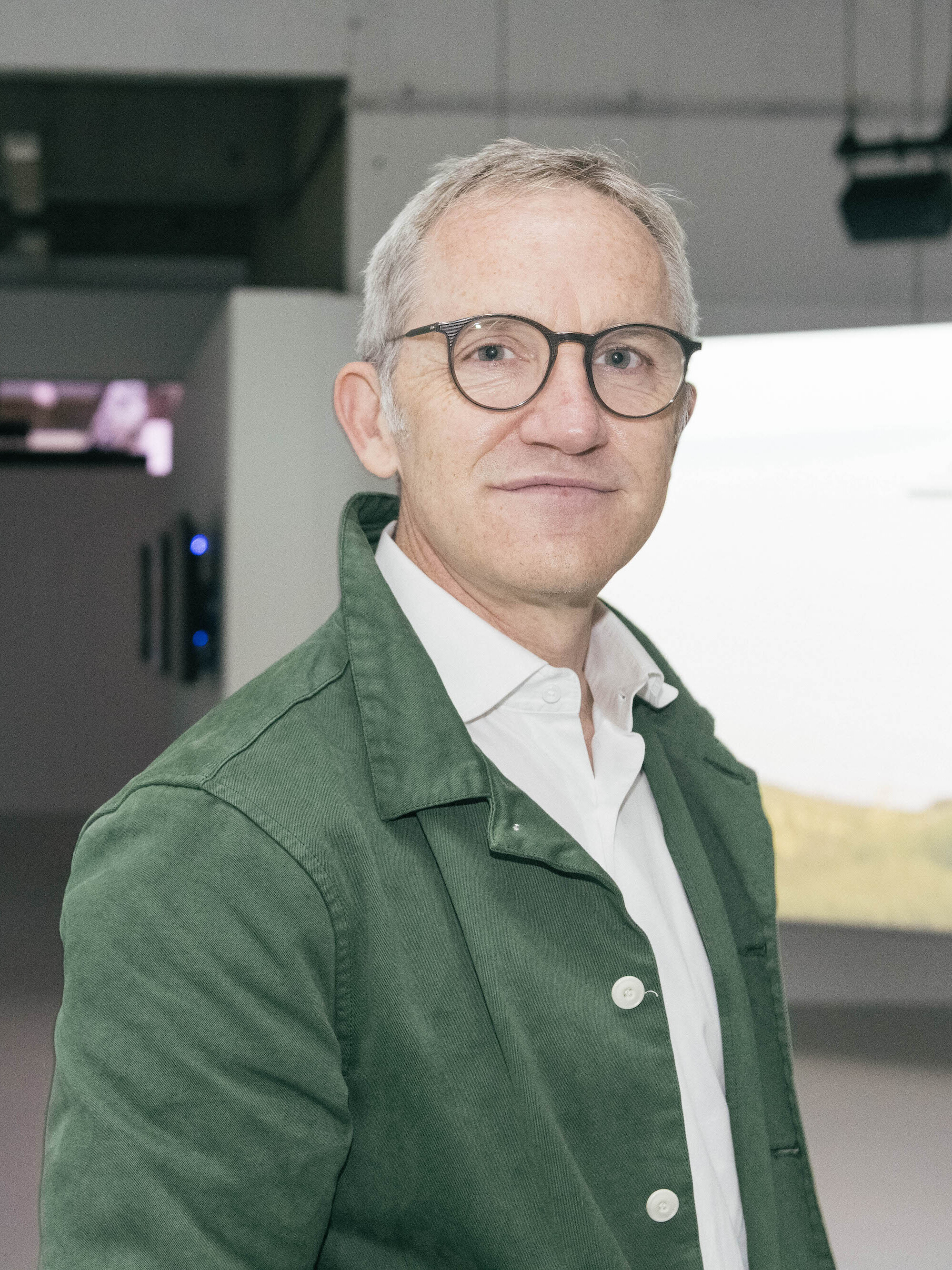
- Incumbent; James Purnell since 20 July 2026
- Office of the Prime Minister
- Style: Downing Street Chief of Staff
- Type: Political adviser
- Reports to: Prime Minister
- Seat: Downing Street
- Appointer: Prime Minister
- Formation: 4 May 1979
- First holder: David Wolfson
- Salary: £170,000 per annum
- Website: 10 Downing Street

The Downing Street chief of staff is the most senior political appointee in the Office of the prime minister of the United Kingdom, acting as a senior aide to the prime minister. The chief of staff holds a highly powerful, non-ministerial position within His Majesty's Government.

The role of chief of staff initially had executive authority, vested by the prime minister, and at the time of its inception, was referred to as the most powerful unelected official in the UK and possibly ranked third in government, after the prime minister and the chancellor of the exchequer. Since 2007, the role does not have legal or executive authority, although the post holder remains, by definition, the senior adviser to the prime minister, and controls access to the prime minister and their staff.

From 1997 to 2019, and from November 2020, the title of chief of staff has been held by the most senior special adviser at Downing Street. Steve Barclay, the Member of Parliament for North East Cambridgeshire, served as chief of staff from February 2022 to July 2022, following the resignation of Dan Rosenfield. He was the first MP to serve in the role, and also retained his position as Chancellor of the Duchy of Lancaster, and as a Cabinet minister. On 24 July 2019, Dominic Cummings was appointed as a senior adviser to Prime Minister Boris Johnson and was described as the de facto chief of staff from 24 July 2019 to 13 November 2020 during the COVID-19 pandemic.

Vidhya Alakeson and Jill Cuthbertson were the acting chiefs of staff, having replaced Morgan McSweeney, who was appointed to the position in October 2024 and resigned on 8 February 2026. Former government minister James Purnell was appointed to the role when Andy Burnham became Prime Minister.

== Description ==
The chief of staff is an appointed special adviser or a career civil servant who is personally and politically close to the prime minister. The responsibilities of the post have varied according to the wishes of the sitting prime minister. Since the chief of staff is at the centre of the Downing Street operation, he or she will always be influential and closely involved in government policy formulation and implementation, political strategy and communication, and generally advising the prime minister, in conjunction with their wider "ministerial adviser" colleagues.

== History ==
The first official chief of staff in 10 Downing Street was David Wolfson, under Margaret Thatcher from 1979 to 1985. The position of Downing Street Chief of Staff was recreated by Tony Blair upon his becoming prime minister in 1997 and Jonathan Powell held the post for ten years.

In 1997 Tony Blair gave his chief of staff, a special adviser, 'unprecedented powers' to issue orders to civil servants. Previously the Cabinet secretary had been the most senior non-ministerial figure in the British Government, and along with the principal private secretary to the prime minister had supported the prime minister in the running of 10 Downing Street. Following the creation of the role, the chief of staff supplanted the principal private secretary in running Downing Street operations and effectively replaced the power of the Cabinet secretary in terms of co-ordinating government policy.

Although the Cabinet secretary continued to be a highly important role, through remaining responsible for making sure that the civil service was organised effectively and was capable of delivering the Government's objectives, the chief of staff replaced the Cabinet Secretary as the "right-hand man" for the prime minister. "Powell had been at the epicentre of power. As Tony Blair's chief of staff, he was the ultimate fixer, the prime minister's first line of defence against events, baby-catcher in chief. When things went wrong, people called Powell."

When Powell stood down as chief of staff at the end of the Blair premiership in June 2007, the incoming prime minister, Gordon Brown, temporarily appointed civil servant Tom Scholar as both Downing Street chief of staff and principal private secretary to the prime minister. This was changed upon Scholar's scheduled departure in January 2008, when the title chief of staff was divided amongst two posts in an attempt to split the political policy communication role from the management of civil servants within Number 10. As such, senior civil servant Jeremy Heywood replaced Scholar as principal private secretary to the prime minister, a position he had held under Tony Blair several years earlier, with the role of chief of strategy and principal adviser to the prime minister (effectively chief of staff) being given to political adviser Stephen Carter.

After less than a year in the post Carter resigned, becoming a minister and receiving a peerage amid speculation that his 'chief of strategy' role had insufficient authority to direct cross-government operations; the position of chief of staff remained vacant for the remainder of the Brown Premiership. Upon David Cameron becoming prime minister in May 2010, Conservative adviser Edward Llewellyn was appointed as Downing Street chief of staff. Cameron also created the role of Downing Street deputy chief of staff, with responsibility for supporting the chief of staff, which was given to Catherine Fall.

Theresa May appointed two joint chiefs of staff in Nick Timothy and Fiona Hill upon becoming prime minister in 2016. Former minister Gavin Barwell succeeded Timothy and Hill after the 2017 general election. The formal title was out of use between July 2019 and November 2020, under prime minister Boris Johnson, when the role was overseen by Dominic Cummings as chief adviser and Edward Lister as chief strategic adviser; during this time, Cummings was noted to be the de facto chief of staff. When Cummings departed Downing Street, Johnson appointed Lister as acting chief of staff.

Lister was succeeded by Dan Rosenfield on a permanent basis. In February 2022, following months of scandal owing to Partygate, Rosenfield, alongside other senior aides Martin Reynolds, Munira Mirza and Jack Doyle, resigned. He was replaced by Steve Barclay, the first MP to hold the position. Barclay served concurrently as Chancellor of the Duchy of Lancaster, giving him notable power over Whitehall operations.

Five months later, the resignation of Sajid Javid during the July 2022 government crisis caused a vacancy in the office of Secretary of State for Health and Social Care, which Barclay was appointed to fill shortly before Boris Johnson's resignation as prime minister. While no successor was formally appointed, Simone Finn, Baroness Finn held the role in a de facto, acting capacity.

On 6 September 2022 Mark Fullbrook, a veteran Conservative party strategist was installed in the role as part of the incoming Truss ministry. Upon Rishi Sunak becoming prime minister on 25 October 2022, he installed long-term adviser Liam Booth-Smith as chief of staff, making Fullbrook the shortest-serving chief of staff in the office's history.

== List of Downing Street chiefs of staff ==
Denotes service as acting or de facto chief of staff

Downing Street chief of staff
| Chief of Staff | Term of office | | Duration | Peerage | Party | Ministry |
|---|---|---|---|---|---|---|
| David Wolfson | 4 May 1979 | 2 September 1985 | 6 years, 121 days | Baron Wolfson of Sunningdale | Conservative | Thatcher I Thatcher II |
| Vacant 2 September 1985 – 2 May 1997; Various de facto Chiefs of Staff | | | | | | Thatcher II; Thatcher III; Major I Major II |
| Jonathan Powell | 2 May 1997 | 27 June 2007 | 10 years, 56 days | | Labour | Blair I Blair II; Blair III |
| Tom Scholar | 27 June 2007 | 23 January 2008 | 210 days | | Independent | Brown |
| Vacant 23 January 2008 – 11 May 2010 (Note: It has sometimes been claimed that Jeremy Heywood served as chief of staff from October 2008 – May 2010, but he himself maintained that this was not the case (see adjacently-cited Institute for Government article).); Stephen Carter served as Chief of Strategy and Principal Adviser to the Prime Minister from 23 January to 10 October 2008. Jeremy Heywood served as the 'de facto' Chief of Staff from 10 October 2008 to 11 May 2010. | | | | | | Brown |
| Edward Llewellyn | 11 May 2010 | 13 July 2016 | 6 years, 63 days | Baron Llewellyn of Steep | Conservative | Cameron–Clegg |
| Edward Llewellyn | 11 May 2010 | 13 July 2016 | 6 years, 63 days | Baron Llewellyn of Steep | Conservative | Cameron II |
| Fiona Hill | 14 July 2016 | 9 June 2017 | 330 days | (Note: Both Received CBE for political and public service.) | Conservative | May I |
| Nick Timothy | 14 July 2016 | 9 June 2017 | 330 days | (Note: Both Received CBE for political and public service.) | Conservative | May I |
| Gavin Barwell | 10 June 2017 | 24 July 2019 | 2 years, 44 days | Baron Barwell | Conservative | May II |
| Vacant 24 July 2019 – 13 November 2020; Dominic Cummings as chief adviser to the prime minister of the United Kingdom and Edward Lister as chief strategic adviser | | | | | | Johnson I |
| Edward Lister, Baron Udny-Lister (Acting) | 13 November 2020 | 1 January 2021 | 49 days | | Conservative | Johnson II |
| Dan Rosenfield | 1 January 2021 | 5 February 2022 | 1 year, 35 days | Baron Rosenfield | Independent | Johnson II |
| Steve Barclay MP | 5 February 2022 | 5 July 2022 | 150 days | | Conservative | Johnson II |
| Simone Finn, Baroness Finn (acting; de facto) | 5 July 2022 | 6 September 2022 | 63 days | | Conservative | Johnson II |
| Mark Fullbrook | 6 September 2022 | 25 October 2022 | 49 days | | Conservative | Truss |
| Liam Booth-Smith | 25 October 2022 | 5 July 2024 | 1 year, 254 days | Baron Booth-Smith | Conservative | Sunak |
| Sue Gray | 5 July 2024 | 6 October 2024 | 93 days | Baroness Gray of Tottenham | Labour | Starmer |
| Morgan McSweeney | 6 October 2024 | 8 February 2026 | 2 years, 26 days | | Labour | Starmer |
| Vidhya Alakeson | 8 February 2026 | 20 July 2026 | 162 days | | Labour | Starmer |
| Jill Cuthbertson | 8 February 2026 | 20 July 2026 | 162 days | | Labour | Starmer |
| James Purnell | 20 July 2026 | Incumbent | 104 days | | Labour | Burnham |

== Deputy chiefs of staff ==
Denotes service as acting or de facto chief of staff

Downing Street deputy chiefs of staff
| Deputy Chief of Staff | Term of office | | Duration | Peerage | Chief(s) of Staff | Prime Minister | Ministry |
|---|---|---|---|---|---|---|---|
No formal Deputy Chief of Staff appointed before 1997
| Pat McFadden | 1997 | 2001 | 3 years, 334 days* | | Jonathan Powell | Labour | Blair I |
Vacant 2001–2005 Various advisers performed deputy chief of staff functions during this period.
| Liz Lloyd | 2005 | 27 June 2007 | 2 years, 177 days* | Baroness Lloyd | Jonathan Powell | Labour | Blair III |
| Gavin Kelly | 27 June 2007 | 2010 | 2 years, 188 days* | | Tom Scholar; Stephen Carter | Labour | Brown |
| Kate Fall | 11 May 2010 | 13 July 2016 | 6 years, 63 days | Baroness Fall | Edward Llewellyn | Conservative | Cameron–Clegg; Cameron II |
| Oliver Dowden | 2012 | 2015 | 3 years, 0 days* | | Edward Llewellyn | Conservative | Cameron–Clegg; Cameron II |
| Joanna Penn | July 2016 | July 2019 | 3 years, 0 days* | Baroness Penn | Fiona Hill and Nick Timothy; Gavin Barwell | Conservative | May I May II |
| Cleo Watson | 2019 | 2020 | 1 year, 0 days* | | Dominic Cummings; Edward Lister | Conservative | Johnson I |
| Katie Lam | 2019 | 12 March 2021 | 2 years, 70 days* | | Dominic Cummings; Dan Rosenfield | Conservative | Johnson I Johnson II |
| Henry Cook | September 2020 | January 2021 | 122 days* | | Dan Rosenfield | Conservative | Johnson II |
| Simone Finn, Baroness Finn | 13 February 2021 | 6 September 2022 | 1 year, 205 days | | Dan Rosenfield; Steve Barclay; Simone Finn (acting) | Conservative | Johnson II |
| Ben Gascoigne | November 2021 | 5 July 2022 | 246 days* | Baron Gascoigne | Dan Rosenfield; Steve Barclay; Simone Finn (acting) | Conservative | Johnson II |
| David Canzini | February 2022 | 5 July 2022 | 154 days* | | Steve Barclay | Conservative | Johnson II |
| Ruth Porter | 6 September 2022 | 25 October 2022 | 49 days | Baroness Porter of Fulwood | Mark Fullbrook | Conservative | Truss |
| Will Tanner | November 2022 | July 2024 | 1 year, 243 days* | | Liam Booth-Smith | Conservative | Sunak |
| Rupert Yorke | November 2022 | July 2024 | 1 year, 243 days* | | Liam Booth-Smith | Conservative | Sunak |
| Vidhya Alakeson | 6 October 2024 | 8 February 2026 | 1 year, 125 days | | Morgan McSweeney themselves (acting) | Labour | Starmer |
| Jill Cuthbertson | 6 October 2024 | 8 February 2026 | 1 year, 125 days | | Morgan McSweeney themselves (acting) | Labour | Starmer |
| Alison Phillips | 20 July 2026 | Incumbent | 104 days | | James Purnell | Labour | Burnham |
| Caroline Simpson | 20 July 2026 | Incumbent | 104 days | | James Purnell | Labour | Burnham |

=== Unofficial deputies ===
| Name | Office | Term |
|---|---|---|
| Bernard Ingham | Press Secretary to the Prime Minister | 1979–1990 |
| Charles Powell | Private Secretary for Foreign Affairs to the Prime Minister | 1984–1991 |
| Sarah Hogg | Director of the Policy Unit | 1990–1995 |
| Norman Blackwell | Director of the Policy Unit | 1995–1997 |
| Jeremy Heywood | Principal Private Secretary to the Prime Minister | 1999–2003 |
| Ivan Rogers | Principal Private Secretary to the Prime Minister | 2003–2005 |

== See also ==
- Chief of staff
  - Chief of Staff to the Prime Minister (Canada)
  - Chief of Staff to the Prime Minister (Australia)
  - White House Chief of Staff
- Prime Minister's Office
