= London Nautical School =

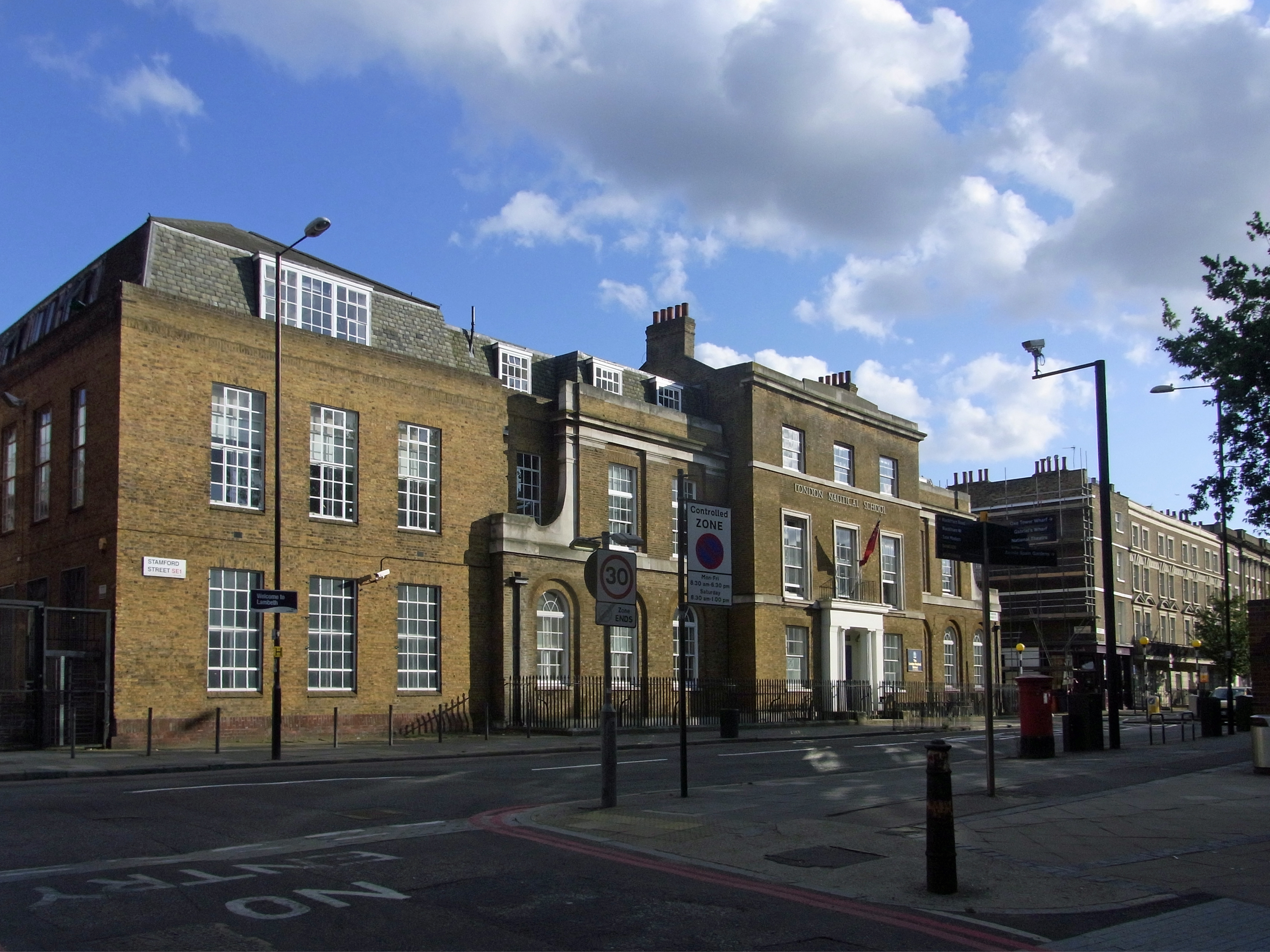

Location
- 61 Stamford Street; Waterloo, Greater London, SE1 9NA; England
- Coordinates: 51.5066°N 0.1084°W

Information
- Other name: LNS
- Type: Foundation school
- Motto: Latin: Tamesis Suos Ubique Feret (The Thames shall carry her people everywhere)
- Established: 1915
- Local authority: Lambeth London Borough Council
- Specialist: Sports College
- Department for Education URN: 100642 Tables
- Ofsted: Reports
- Head teacher: Michael Schofield
- Gender: Boys
- Age range: 11–18
- Enrolment: 629 (2019)
- Capacity: 720
- Colours: Black and navy blue
- Website: www.lns.org.uk

London Nautical School (LNS) is a foundation secondary school for boys and mixed sixth form in Waterloo, Greater London, England. It was established in 1915.

== History ==
The London Nautical School was established in 1915 in response to the Titanic disaster and subsequent Government inquiry. In 1990, it became one of the country's first 11–18 comprehensive secondary schools for boys to be awarded grant-maintained status. In September 1999, it became a foundation school and was awarded Sports College status in 2003.

== Curriculum ==
The school's academic programme is supported by close associations with the Maritime industry and local football academy offering a range of courses and qualifications in support of its curriculum. The school maintains its own fleet of boats on the River Thames and hosts its own Sea Cadet Unit.

== Notable alumni ==
- Marcus Bettinelli, professional footballer
- John Bostock, professional footballer
- Abdul Buhari, athlete
- Jim Dowd, politician
- Stewart Jackson, politician and adviser
- Edward Lister, political strategist
- Reiss Nelson, professional footballer
- Jeff Probyn, rugby union player
- Mark Stanhope, retired Royal Navy officer
- John Wardle, bass guitarist, singer, poet and composer
- Gregg Wallace, media personality, presenter, writer, and former grocer
