= Weald of Kent (constituency) =

UK Parliament constituency (since 2024)

Coordinates: 51.11°N 0.69°E

- County constituency for the House of Commons
- Boundaries since 2024
- Boundary of Weald of Kent in South East England
- County: Kent
- Electorate: 70,110 (2023)
- Major settlements: Tenterden, Cranbrook, Coxheath, Staplehurst

Current constituency
- Created: 2024
- Member of Parliament: Katie Lam (Conservative)
- Seats: One
- Created from: Ashford; Faversham and Mid Kent; Maidstone and the Weald

Weald of Kent is a constituency of the House of Commons in the UK Parliament. It was created in the 2023 review of Westminster constituencies, and first contested at the 2024 general election. The current MP is Katie Lam.

== Constituency profile ==
The constituency is one of the most rural seats in the South East, unlike its neighbours which each include at least one large town. House prices and incomes are significantly above UK averages. Electoral Calculus characterises the proposed seat as "Strong Right", with right-wing economic and social views, high home ownership levels and strong support for Brexit.

== Boundaries ==
Under the 2023 review, the constituency was defined as comprising the following, as they existed on 1 December 2020:

- The Borough of Ashford wards of: Biddenden, Charing, Downs North [Chilham], Downs West [Challock], Isle of Oxney, Kingsnorth Village & Bridgefield, Rolvenden & Tenterden West, Tenterden North, Tenterden South, Tenterden St Michael's, Weald Central [Bethersden], Weald North [Smarden], and Weald South [Hamstreet & Woodchurch];
- The Borough of Maidstone wards of: Boughton Monchelsea and Chart Sutton, Coxheath and Hunton, Headcorn & Sutton Valence, Loose, Marden and Yalding, Staplehurst, and Sutton Valence and Langley;
- The Borough of Tunbridge Wells wards of: Benenden and Cranbrook, and Frittenden and Sissinghurst.

Following local government boundary reviews in Maidstone and Tunbridge Wells which came into effect in May 2024, the constituency now comprises the following from the 2024 general election:

- The Borough of Ashford wards of: Biddenden; Charing; Downs North; Downs West; Isle of Oxney; Kingsnorth Village & Bridgefield; Rolvenden & Tenterden West; Tenterden North; Tenterden South; Tenterden St Michael's; Weald Central; Weald North; Weald South.
- The Borough of Maidstone wards or part wards of: Boughton Monchelsea & Chart Sutton (most); Coxheath & Farleigh; Headcorn & Sutton Valence; Leeds & Langley (Langley parish); Loose & Linton (part); Marden & Yalding; Staplehurst.
- The Borough of Tunbridge Wells ward of Cranbrook, Sissinghurst and Frittenden; and the Benenden parish of the Hawkhurst, Sandhurst and Benenden ward.

The seat is a mostly rural area in the centre of Kent, including Tenterden, Coxheath, Staplehurst, Headcorn and Cranbrook. The seat was previously part of the Ashford, Maidstone and the Weald, and Faversham and Mid Kent constituencies.

== Members of Parliament ==
Ashford and Maidstone and the Weald prior to 2024

Election	Member	Party
2024	Katie Lam	Conservative

== Elections ==
=== Elections in the 2020s ===
General election 2024: Weald of Kent
Party	Candidate	Votes	%	±%
Conservative	Katie Lam	20,202	39.8	−32.2
Labour	Lenny Rolles	11,780	23.2	+9.1
Reform	Daniel Kersten	10,208	20.1	N/A
Green	Kate Walder	4,547	9.0	+5.1
Liberal Democrats	John Howson	3,975	7.8	−2.3
Majority		8,422	16.6	−41.3
Turnout		50,712	66.7	−4.1
Registered electors		75,988		
Conservative hold		Swing	−20.7	

=== Elections in the 2010s ===
2019 notional result
Party	Vote	%
Conservative	35,730	72.0
Labour	6,979	14.1
Liberal Democrats	5,018	10.1
Green	1,925	3.9
Turnout	49,652	70.8
Electorate	70,110	

== See also ==
- Parliamentary constituencies in Kent
- List of parliamentary constituencies in the South East England (region)
