= Edward Lister, Baron Udny-Lister =

British political strategist (born 1949)

The Right Honourable The Lord Udny-Lister PC
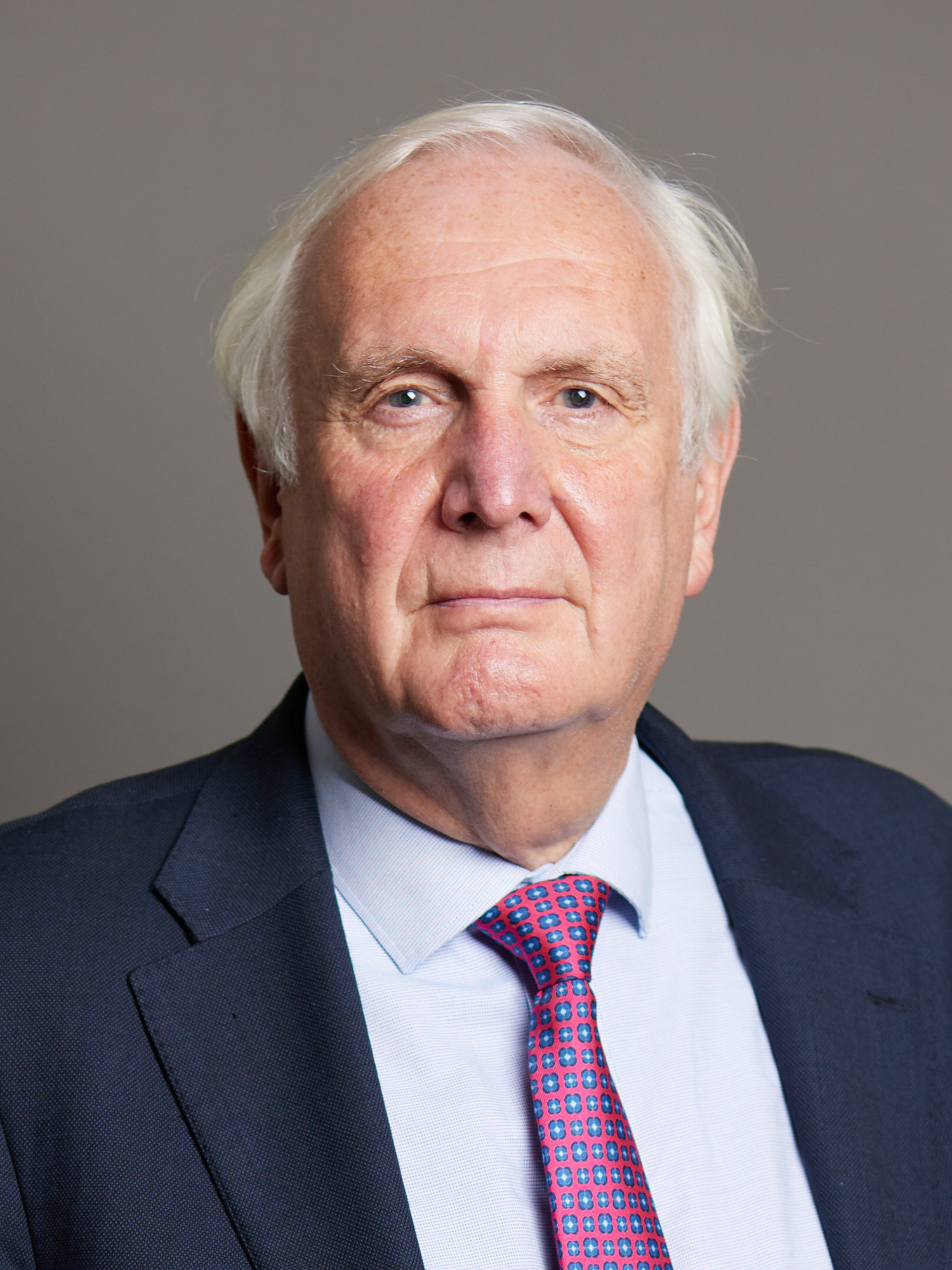
- Official portrait, 2021

Downing Street Chief of Staff (Note: Acting from November 2020 to January 2021. Chief Strategic Adviser from July 2019 to November 2020.)
- In office 24 July 2019 – 1 January 2021 Serving with Dominic Cummings (Note: Cummings served as chief adviser to the prime minister until November 2020)
- Prime Minister: Boris Johnson
- Preceded by: Gavin Barwell
- Succeeded by: Dan Rosenfield

Deputy Mayor of London for Policy
- In office 1 May 2011 – 9 May 2016
- Preceded by: Simon Milton
- Succeeded by: Jules Pipe

Member of the House of Lords
- Lord Temporal
- Life peerage 6 November 2020

Leader of Wandsworth Council
- In office 10 April 1992 – 30 April 2011
- Preceded by: Paul Beresford
- Succeeded by: Ravi Govindia

Personal details
- Born: Edward Julian Udny-Lister; 25 October 1949 (age 77) Hammersmith, London, England
- Party: Conservative
- Spouse: Eileen Elizabeth McHugh (m. 1979)
- Children: 3
- Education: London Nautical School

Edward Julian Udny-Lister, Baron Udny-Lister, PC (born 25 October 1949) is a British political strategist and former politician who served as Downing Street Chief of Staff from 2019 to 2021. He originally solely advised on strategy until the departure of Dominic Cummings as Chief Adviser to the Prime Minister in November 2020. He was previously the Deputy Mayor of London for Policy between 2011 and 2016 and was also Leader of Wandsworth Council from 1992 to 2011.

== Early life and education ==
Lister was born on 25 October 1949, to George and Margot Udny-Lister. He was educated at London Nautical School in Blackfriars, London.

== Career ==
=== Business roles ===
Lister joined Mather and Platt Alarms in 1969 as a trainee, and rose to become Commercial Director. In 1979 he moved to Britannia Security as Sales Manager.

In 1987 he joined ADT Fire & Security, initially as Major Projects Director, and from 1990 as general manager. ADT at this time was controlled and led by Lord Ashcroft.

In 1997 ADT was purchased by Tyco. From 1997 to 2007 Lister was Director, Government Relations, for Tyco Fire & Security. In the early years of this period Tyco was known for its very hard-driving and cost-conscious operational management culture, under Dennis Kozlowski.

After leaving City Hall in 2016, he formed Edward Lister Consultants, remaining as an advisor to Delancey, and as a non-executive director to Stanhope Holdings.

In 2020, following his years in public service, Lister was appointed co-chair, with Ahmed Ali Al Sayegh, of the UAE-UK Business Council, serving in the role until August 2026, when the co-chairs were succeeded by Saeed Al Hajeri and Mervyn Davies, Baron Davies of Abersoch.

=== Public service roles ===
Lister was first elected to Wandsworth Council in 1976.

From 1992 to 2011, Lister was the leader of Wandsworth Council. His approach was regarded as congruent with Thatcherism, and he supported adapting policy to local conditions.

LabourList has called Lister a "right-wing uber-privatiser" who privatised street cleaning and refuse collection, and sold off council housing. Wandsworth was one of the earliest councils to take such actions. Between 2007 and 2010 only 11% of the "affordable" homes built in Wandsworth were for social rent – the lowest in the whole of London. Many ex-council homes became owned by concentrated and absent private landlords.

Lister has been criticised for defending bankers and other wealthy Londoners, saying it would be "really bad news" for London if they left. He has similarly been criticised for high focus on cutting costs. Others have said he made Wandsworth the most successful value for money local authority in the country, with the country's lowest council tax charge and top satisfaction ratings from its residents. In 2019, Wandsworth's council tax remained the lowest in the UK, which the council ascribed to continued cost focus.

From 2007 to 2019, Lister was a Director of Localis, a think-tank focused on local government issues, and particularly localism.

In 2008 Lister carried out a financial audit of Greater London Authority finances for Mayor Boris Johnson. In 2011, following the death of Simon Milton, Lister was appointed as Chief of Staff and Deputy Mayor for Policy and Planning at the Greater London Authority, under Boris Johnson who was Mayor of London. He served until 2016. During this time he became known among senior local government officials in London as "Steady Eddie", due to the quality of practical and restraining advice he offered to Johnson. One area of focus was long-term infrastructure planning.

Following his departure from City Hall in 2016, he took up the role of Chairman of Homes England, and also served as a non-executive director at the Foreign and Commonwealth Office, including during the time that Boris Johnson served as Secretary of State for Foreign and Commonwealth Affairs, and other board roles.

In August 2019, Lister stepped down from his position at Homes England in order to focus on his newly created role as chief strategic adviser to Prime Minister Johnson. Lister's role as chief strategic adviser and Dominic Cummings' role as chief adviser were in place of a formal chief of staff. As well as detailed operational management, Lister played an important role in some aspects of Brexit diplomacy. Lister was believed to have indicated that he may not have stayed in the role after Brexit had been resolved.

After the news broke in November 2020 that Dominic Cummings and Lee Cain were departing Downing Street, Lister was appointed by Johnson as acting Downing Street Chief of Staff. It was announced later that month that Dan Rosenfield would succeed him in January 2021. In February he became the Prime Minister's special envoy to the Gulf. That April he resigned and departed the government.

=== Controversies ===
In 2019, Nigel Farage, then-Leader of the Brexit Party, alleged that Lister was involved in intimidation and offering bribes in exchange for political candidates stepping down.

==== Conflict of interest ====
In February 2021, The Sunday Times reported that Lister was on the payroll of two developers, Stanhope and Delancey, while serving in government as chief strategic advisor to prime minister Boris Johnson, a role which commanded the highest salary band of any special adviser, between £140,000 and £149,000 a year. Lister did not declare these interests in the parliamentary records despite having been ennobled in the summer of 2020. That Lister invited Delancey owner, and Conservative Party donor, Jamie Ritblat into 10 Downing Street at the height of the COVID-19 pandemic to advise on government policy relating to the construction sector, while being remunerated to sit on its board, a fact that was not then known, has also raised conflict of interest concerns amid the Greensill scandal. In 2014, two years prior to joining Delancey, Lister had presided over the firm's planning application for the revamp of the Olympic media centre in east London as Johnson's deputy mayor of planning, for which permission was granted.

Lister's conduct in government was also the subject of controversy in the Royal Mint Court case. Although the claims have been denied, it was reported that Lister arranged the sale of Royal Mint Court for the new Chinese embassy, while holding down a £15,000-a-year non-executive directorship on the board of the Foreign and Commonwealth Office. He was also paid by both parties in the transaction: the consultancy advising the Chinese government and buying the land; and Delancey, the property company founded and run by Ritblat, who had the freehold.

During his time at Homes England, Lister accepted donations totalling nearly half a million pounds from EcoWorld, a Malaysian property development firm, between 2016 and 2019. Although legal, Lister did not declare the amounts he received from EcoWorld. After the news of this possible conflict of interest came to light, Clive Betts, chair of the UK parliament's Housing, Communities and Local Government Select Committee, stated that it is "very wrong that someone in charge of allocating resources to build housing, including affordable housing, has this arrangement with a developer".

In May 2021, the nature of Lister's relations with Ritblat was revealed in The Sunday Times, which extracted an apology from the former senior Boris Johnson aide for having presided over the granting over a generous taxpayer-backed loan of £187m in 2019 to one of Ritblat's developer companies. This state aid, then the largest amount of money ever awarded by Homes England, was granted after an unexpected appearance by Lister at the body's investment committee. Lister had failed to declare that he was being paid by Delancey at the time and instead opened the meeting by claiming that he had "previously undertaken advisory work for Delancey", which led the committee to conclude that "this did not constitute a conflict of interest." In his register of interests, Lister had declared that he advised a firm called Dream Ltd, a formulation that has not been used before or since and is a reference to Delancey Real Estate Asset Management, according to The Sunday Times report. In a statement to the newspaper, Lister conceded that he should have "fully" recused himself at the meeting, but said that he had never lobbied government in relation to the Delancey group.

=== Approach and key skills ===
Lister has said he desires to understand the operations he is responsible for; "If I'm to do the job properly, I've got to understand it, how it works, what makes it tick." His focus is on value; "Firstly, it's got to be about value for money, that's absolutely essential." His key skill is operational delivery; "I just want to get the thing done. That's what I'm good at. The organising and doing and making it happen."

== Personal life ==
Lister married Eileen Elizabeth McHugh in 1979. They have a son and a daughter. Their other son, Andrew, died in 2011 in Thailand, reportedly of a heart attack.

== Honours ==
Lister was made a Knight Bachelor in the 2011 Birthday Honours, "for services to local government". He received the accolade on 30 November 2011. He was created Baron Udny-Lister, of Wandsworth in the London Borough of Wandsworth on 6 November 2020. He made his House of Lords maiden speech on 19 May 2021, reflecting on being a councillor, the advantages of Brexit and working for Boris Johnson. He was sworn in as a member of Her Majesty's Most Honourable Privy Council in 10 March 2021 at Windsor Castle. This gave him the honorific title "The Right Honourable" and the post nominal letters "PC" for life.

== Notes ==
Government offices
Preceded by Dominic Cummings de facto	Downing Street Chief of Staff; Acting; 2020–2021	Succeeded by Dan Rosenfield
Orders of precedence in the United Kingdom
Preceded by The Lord Stewart of Dirleton	Gentlemen; Baron Udny-Lister	Followed by The Lord Lebedev
