= Mark Fullbrook =

British political strategist and lobbyist

Downing Street Chief of Staff
- In office 6 September 2022 – 25 October 2022
- Prime Minister: Liz Truss
- Deputy: Ruth Porter
- Preceded by: Steve Barclay
- Succeeded by: Liam Booth-Smith

Personal details
- Born: June 1962 (age 64)
- Party: Conservative
- Spouse: Lorraine Fullbrook
- Education: University of Warwick

Mark Stephen Fullbrook (born June 1962) is a British political strategist and lobbyist who was Downing Street Chief of Staff from September to October 2022.

== Early life and education ==
Fullbrook was born in June 1962. He read management science at the University of Warwick.

== Career ==
Between January 1988 and December 1992, Fullbrook was the Deputy Head of Campaigning for the Conservative Party under Margaret Thatcher and John Major before working as the Head of Campaigning.

Fullbrook was a partner and the chief global projects officer of the C/T Group from May 2010 to May 2022 alongside Lynton Crosby, a long-time partner of Fullbrook. He established and briefly was CEO of his own consultancy firm, Fullbrook Strategies, between May and September 2022, which advised Liz Truss during her ultimately successful Conservative Party leadership campaign. The company ceased commercial trading several days before Fullbrook's appointment to Downing Street, but became active again when he departed Downing Street.

He has also advised the Libyan house of representatives and the Sante Group, which was awarded a £680 million PPE grant during the COVID-19 pandemic in the United Kingdom.

He has been interviewed by FBI agents about an alleged criminal plot to bribe the former governor of Puerto Rico, Wanda Vázquez Garced, on behalf of Julio Herrera Velutini, a Venezuelan banker.

=== Downing Street Chief of Staff ===
Fullbrook was appointed Downing Street Chief of Staff from September to October 2022, under Liz Truss. The Cabinet Office informed the public that Fullbrook's service for the Prime Minister would be paid through his lobbying company in a highly unusual arrangement that could allow him to pay less tax.

In October 2022 it was reported in the Guardian newspaper that Fullbrook continued to hold a 10% stake in the lobbying business CT Group. In the past clients of CT Group have included Philip Morris (a tobacco company), Glencore (a mining company) and the Saudi Arabian government. The potential conflict of interest had not been publicly disclosed since Fullbrook joined Downing Street as Liz Truss's chief of staff. Fullbrook left CT Group earlier in 2022. During Fullbrook's time as a director of CT Group the company ran a Worldwide campaign to promote the burning of coal on behalf of mining company Glencore. The Saudi Arabian government paid CT Group millions of pounds for work in the UK. Russian oligarchs keen to improve their reputations in the west were also clients of CT Group during Fullbrook's tenure there.

Fullbrook left office as Downing Street chief of staff after Truss' resignation as prime minister, making him the shortest-serving chief of staff. He was succeeded by Liam Booth-Smith.

== Personal life ==
Fullbrook lives in Winchfield. He is married to Lorraine Fullbrook, a former Conservative MP, who was made a life peer by Boris Johnson in 2020.

Government offices
Preceded by Steve Barclay	Downing Street Chief of Staff; September–October 2022	Succeeded by Liam Booth-Smith
