= Ruth Porter, Baroness Porter of Fulwood =

British special adviser and life peer

The Right Honourable The Baroness Porter of Fulwood
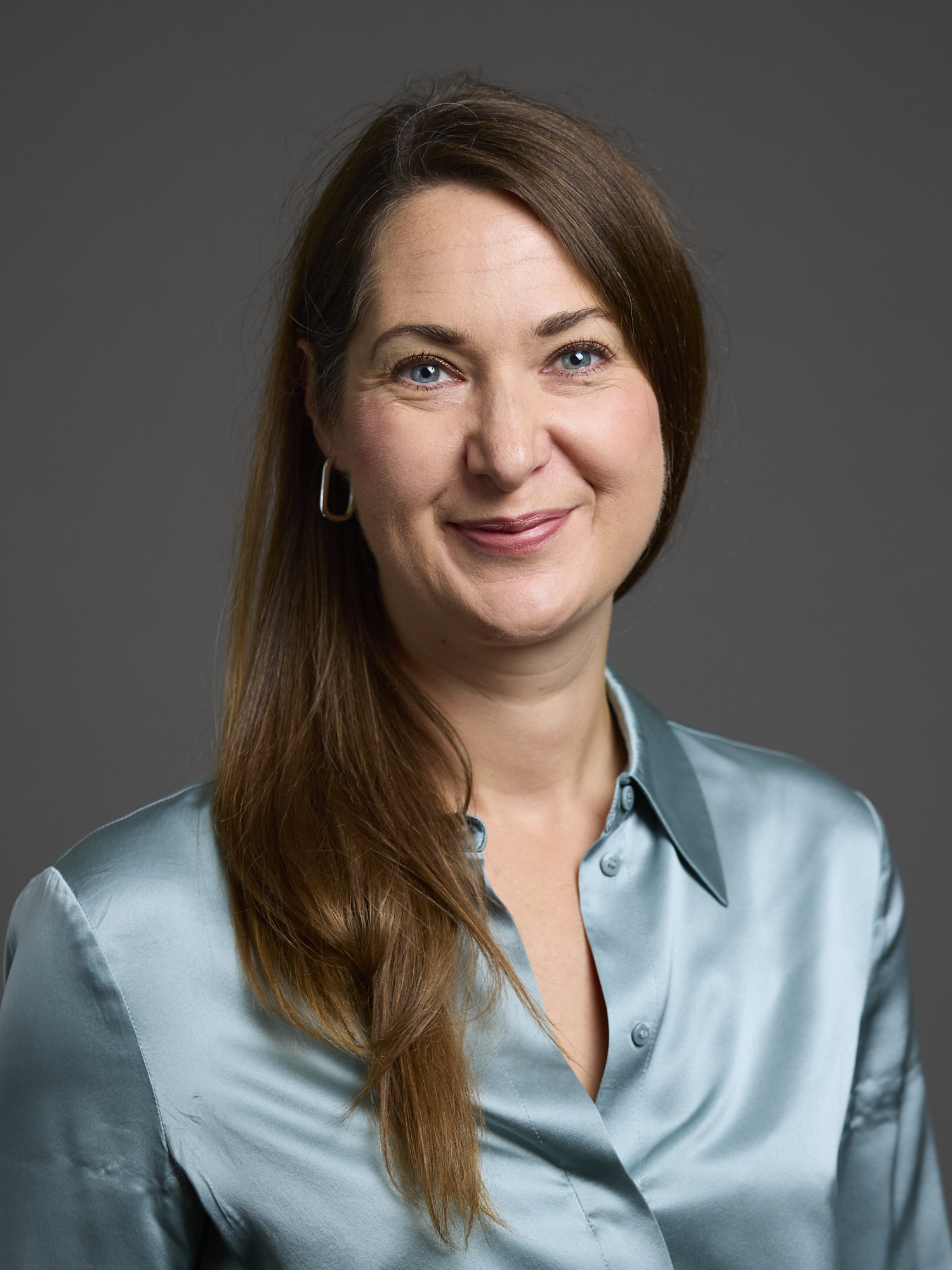
- Official portrait, 2024

Member of the House of Lords
- Lord Temporal
- Life peerage 13 February 2024

Downing Street Deputy Chief of Staff
- In office 6 September 2022 – 25 October 2022
- Prime Minister: Liz Truss
- Chief of Staff: Mark Fullbrook
- Preceded by: David Canzini; Simone Finn
- Succeeded by: Will Tanner
Special adviser positions (2014–2017)
Special adviser to the Secretary of State for Justice
In office July 2016 – June 2017
Secretary of State	Liz Truss
Special adviser to the Leader of the House of Commons
In office September 2015 – July 2016
Leader	Chris Grayling
Special adviser to the Secretary of State for Environment, Food and Rural Affairs
In office August 2014 – March 2015
Secretary of State	Liz Truss

Personal details
- Party: Conservative
- Children: 2
- Education: University of Warwick
- Occupation: Government adviser

Ruth Oates Porter, Baroness Porter of Fulwood (born 1982) is a British life peer and former political adviser who served as Downing Street Deputy Chief of Staff under Prime Minister Liz Truss from September to October 2022. She previously worked as a special adviser in various government departments.

== Education and career ==
Porter studied politics and philosophy at the University of Warwick before moving to New Zealand.

=== Early career (2004–2014) ===
Porter spent several years working for think-tanks including the Maxim Institute in New Zealand where she was a policy analyst from 2004 to 2007 and then as Communications Manager from 2007 to 2009. She was the Programme Manager at techUK from July 2009 to February 2010 and then was the Communications Director at the Institute of Economic Affairs from March 2010 to December 2013, where she called for a reduction in housing benefit and child benefit, charging patients to use the NHS, cutting overseas aid and scrapping green funds. She became the Head of Economics and Social Policy at Policy Exchange in January 2014 and held the position for 8 months until August of the same year.

=== Special adviser (2014–2017) ===
Porter was a special adviser between 2014 and 2017, in the Department for Environment, Food and Rural Affairs to Environment Secretary Liz Truss from 2014 to 2015, then to Leader of the House of Commons Chris Grayling from 2015 to 2016, and then returned to Truss in the Ministry of Justice from 2016 to 2017.

=== Private sector and political candidacy (2017–2022) ===
Porter then moved to the private sector where she became Head of UK government relations at London Stock Exchange Group in November 2017 and was promoted to Head of International Affairs, government relations and regulatory strategy in April 2020. She later became managing director at Finsbury Glover Hering in April 2021 and then at FGS Global in June 2022.

Porter was on a Conservative party shortlist as a candidate to become Member of Parliament for Arundel and South Downs for the 2019 general election but Andrew Griffith was selected instead.

Porter was a Conservative candidate in the 2022 Richmond upon Thames London Borough Council election for St Margarets and North Twickenham but was not elected, finishing with 646 votes.

=== Downing Street Deputy Chief of Staff (2022) ===
From September to October 2022, Porter served as the Downing Street Deputy Chief of Staff under Liz Truss. She had previously run the Truss election campaign alongside Mark Fullbrook.

=== Post-government career (2022–present) ===
After her career in Downing Street as Deputy Chief of Staff, Porter sought advice from the Advisory Committee on Business Appointments who considered the risk of her returning to her career she held previously being a reward for actions taken in office as low, and Porter returned to her previous position as managing director at FGS Global in February 2023.

Porter was nominated by Liz Truss for a life peerage in her list of resignation honours. She was created Baroness Porter of Fulwood, of Fulwood in the City of Sheffield, on 13 February 2024.

== Personal life ==
Porter has two daughters.
