= Tokyo Industries =

- Company type: Private company
- Industry: Late Night Entertainment
- Founded: Greater Manchester (December 1997)
- Headquarters: Newcastle upon Tyne, UK
- Area served: United Kingdom
- Key people: Aaron Mellor, CEO
- Number of employees: 2000+
- Website: tokyoindustries.com

Tokyo Industries Limited is a private company, based in the North of England, with an estate of over 30 venues, including Nightclubs, Hotels, Bars and Restaurants.

== History ==
Tokyo industries was founded in 1997 in Greater Manchester by Aaron Mellor, opening their first venue, Tokyo Project, in Oldham. A second venue opened shortly afterwards in Ashton-under-Lyne followed by a third, The Castle, in Oldham.

In 2013, the 150 year old premises The Castle was bought by Transport for Greater Manchester with plans to demolish the site due to the ongoing Manchester Metrolink construction. In October 2016, Tokyo Industries opened its venue Church Leeds with Leeds clubbing legend Dave Beer of Back To Basics.

== Venues and brands ==
The company operates numerous well-known independent brands, including Digital, Factory, Tup Tup Palace, Brewdog Hull, Fibbers, Impossible, HANGAR 8289, Stein Bier Keller, BrewHaus, City Vaults, The Magnet, The Castle, Get Baked, and Tokyo, along with various one-off venues and events. Most of their sites are owned freehold, and they are recognized for using Funktion-One sound systems at nearly all locations.

=== Nightclubs ===
- Factory 251 (Manchester, UK) – The former headquarters of Factory Records, in Manchester, opened as a nightclub in 2010. The venue featured prominently in the 2002 film 24 Hour Party People. www.FactoryManchester.com
- Digital (Newcastle, UK) – Digital opened in 2005 in the center of Newcastle upon Tyne. The award-winning venue was rated as the 11th best nightclub in the world by DJ Magazine. www.YourFutureIsDIGITAL.com
- Tup Tup Palace (Newcastle, UK) – A high end bottle service club in the center of Newcastle upon Tyne. www.TupTupPalace.com
- South (Manchester, UK) – Originally opened in Manchester in 1995 and re-designed by Ben Kelly (designer), the award-winning designer of The Haçienda.
- Church (Leeds, UK) – A Grade II listed church in Leeds, converted into a music venue for live bands and club nights. www.ChurchLeeds.com
- Impossible (Manchester, UK) – A highly theatrical immersive clubbing experience with performers and actors located in Manchester, opened in 2017 and winning multiple design and innovation awards. www.BE-IMPOSSIBLE.com
- The Welly (Hull, UK) – Also known as [w] and located on Beverley Road, The Welly is an alternative night club in Hull with such events as "Emo Night" and live music events, as well as occasional comedy and other entertainment.
- Hangar 8289 (Ibiza, Spain) – a creative arts and event space on the Spanish Balearic Island of Ibiza, 3 spaces focusing on MUSIC - ART - FASHION www.HANGAR-8289.com
- LOT613 (Los Angeles, USA) – a creative arts and events space in the fashionable DTLA Arts District. www.LOT613.com
- Industrial Avenue (Dubai, UAE) – an underground dance music club located in the Dubai Marina area of the United Arab Emirates www.IndustrialAvenue.com

=== Festivals ===
- Lost Village – Boutique summer festival in woodland outside Lincoln started in 2015 in collaboration with Moda Black owners, Jaymo and Andy George. www.LostVillageFestival.com
- Obonjan – Three month island festival held on a private island near the coast of Croatia www.Obonjan-Island.com

=== Other interests ===
- Desert Hills – a midcentury American hotel located in the fashionable desert city of Palm Springs well known for its historic architectural look and its Coachella Music Festival 2hrs drive from LA California www.Desert-Hills.com
- Openlab – an FM radio station based in the Spanish Balearic islands of Ibiza & Formentera, broadcasting alternative electronic music on 106.4fm with an online creative art website www.OPENLAB.fm
- HackRod – a spatial web based genetic design platform allowing users to design one of concept vehicles, outsourced as a digital twin and printed using industrial grade Industrial 3D Printers www.HACKROD.com
- Off The Rails – a photographer and anti-art magazine in printed and social media formats & brand development partnerships www.OffTheRailsMag.com
