= Dominic Cummings =

British political strategist (born 1971)

Chief Adviser to the UK Prime Minister
- In office 24 July 2019 – 13 November 2020 Serving with Edward Lister (Note: Lister served as Chief Strategic Adviser to the Prime Minister)
- Prime Minister: Boris Johnson
- Preceded by: Gavin Barwell (Note: As Downing Street Chief of Staff.)
- Succeeded by: Edward Lister (Note: As acting Downing Street Chief of Staff.)

Personal details
- Born: Dominic Mckenzie Cummings; 25 November 1971 (age 54) Durham, County Durham, England
- Spouse: Mary Wakefield (m. 2011)
- Children: 1
- Education: Durham School; Exeter College, Oxford (BA)
- Occupation: Political adviser
- Known for: Special adviser to Education Secretary Michael Gove, 2010–2014; Campaign Director of Vote Leave, 2015–2016; Chief adviser to Prime Minister Boris Johnson, 2019–2020
- Website: dominiccummings.com

Dominic Mckenzie Cummings (born 25 November 1971) is a British political strategist who served as chief adviser to British Prime Minister Boris Johnson from 24 July 2019 until he resigned on 13 November 2020.

From 2007 to 2014, he was a special adviser to Michael Gove, including the time that Gove served as Education Secretary, leaving when Gove was made Chief Whip in a cabinet reshuffle. From 2015 to 2016, Cummings was director of Vote Leave, an organisation which successfully executed the 2016 referendum campaign for Britain's exit from the European Union. After Johnson was appointed prime minister in July 2019, Cummings was appointed as Chief Adviser to the Prime Minister. Cummings had a contentious relationship with Chancellor Sajid Javid which culminated in Javid's resignation in February 2020 after he refused to comply with Cummings's request to dismiss his special advisers.

A scandal involving Cummings occurred in May 2020, after it was reported that he travelled to his parents' farm in Durham during the COVID-19 lockdowns while experiencing COVID-19 symptoms. 45 Conservative MPs called for his resignation and Cummings was criticised by opposition parties for noncompliance with public health restrictions. After Cummings held a press conference explaining his journey, Johnson supported his chief adviser by saying Cummings had acted "responsibly, legally and with integrity". Durham police said that they did not consider an offence was committed when Cummings travelled from London to Durham and that a minor breach might have occurred in travelling from there to Barnard Castle. The scandal negatively affected the public's trust in the government's pandemic response.

Since leaving Downing Street in November 2020, Cummings has criticised the British government response to the COVID-19 pandemic and Johnson's leadership on several occasions.

== Early life ==
Cummings was born in Durham on 25 November 1971. His father, Robert, now a farmer, had a varied career, primarily as an oil rig project manager for Laing, the construction firm. His mother, Morag, became a teacher and behavioural specialist after private schooling and university. Sir John Laws, a former Lord Justice of Appeal, was his maternal uncle.

After attending state primary school, he was privately educated at Durham School and later attended Exeter College, Oxford, where he studied under Norman Stone, graduating in 1994 with a First in Ancient and Modern History. One of his former tutors has described him to the New Statesman as "fizzing with ideas, unconvinced by any received set of views about anything". He was "something like a Robespierre – someone determined to bring down things that don’t work." Also in his youth, he worked at Klute, a nightclub owned by his uncle in Durham.

After graduating, Cummings moved to Russia and lived there until 1997. He shared a flat with the later Brexit-supporting economist Liam Halligan.

He worked for a group attempting to set up an airline connecting Samara in southern Russia to Vienna in Austria which George Parker of the Financial Times said was "spectacularly unsuccessful".

== Political career ==
From 1999 to 2002, Cummings was campaign director at Business for Sterling, the campaign against the UK joining the euro. He then became Director of Strategy for Conservative Party leader Iain Duncan Smith for eight months in 2002, aiming to modernise the Conservative Party (of which he was not a member). He soon left in frustration at the introduction of what he saw as half-measures, labelling Duncan Smith "incompetent".

The New Frontiers Foundation, a free-market libertarian and Eurosceptic think tank which grew out of Business For Sterling, was founded by Cummings in December 2003, with James Frayne as its co-founder. Cummings directed the group, and was described by Andrew Pierce in The Times as "a youthful, mercurial figure who has brought together a diverse coalition including Bob Geldof and the Labour MP Frank Field to oppose the single currency". The Foundation published articles and papers which argued against the United Kingdom having 'ever-closer union' with the European Union at the cost of defence links with the United States. It also argued for the abolition of all trade tariffs, reform of the United Nations, research into hypersonic bombers, the creation of a research body to fund high-risk scientific projects, reform of the British civil service, and the abolition of the BBC as a public service broadcaster. The Foundation argued that the BBC was the "mortal enemy" of Conservatives, saying: "There are three structural things that the right needs to happen in terms of communications. 1) the undermining of the BBC's credibility; 2) the creation of a Fox News equivalent / talk radio shows / bloggers etc to shift the centre of gravity; 3) the end of the ban on TV political advertising". The Foundation closed in March 2005.

Cummings was a key figure in North East Says No (NESNO) the successful campaign against a North-East Regional Assembly in 2004. Populist tactics used in this referendum were later seen as a precursor to ones used by Cummings during the Brexit referendum; for example, Cummings argued against the Assembly on the basis of increased money for the NHS, and toured the region with a huge prop white elephant. After the campaign, Cummings moved to his father's farm in County Durham.

In 2006, while in a position of what Andrew Neil called "overall responsibility" for the website of The Spectator, Cummings republished a controversial cartoon depicting Muhammed with a bomb in his turban. This was the first time the cartoon had been published by any British news organisation and was removed after interventions from the publisher of The Spectator.

=== Special Adviser to Michael Gove (2007–2014) ===
Cummings worked for Conservative politician Michael Gove in various roles in opposition and government from 2007 to 2014. From February 2011 to January 2014, he was special adviser (spad) and Chief of Staff to Gove at the Department for Education (DfE). His appointment was initially blocked by Andy Coulson from 2010 until January 2011. Cummings was later appointed in February 2011 after Coulson's resignation. In this capacity, Cummings wrote a 237-page essay titled "Some thoughts on education and political priorities", about transforming Britain into a "meritocratic technopolis"; the essay was described by Guardian journalist Patrick Wintour as "either mad, bad or brilliant – and probably a bit of all three".

Cummings was known in the DfE for his blunt style and "not suffering fools gladly"; he and Michael Gove railed against the "blob", the informal alliance of senior civil servants and teachers who, in their opinion, sought to frustrate attempts at reform. Cummings was also outspoken regarding other senior politicians, describing Nick Clegg's proposals on free school meals as "Dreamed up on the back of a cigarette packet", and David Davis as "thick as mince" and "lazy as a toad". Patrick Wintour described the Cummings–Gove working relationship: "Gove, polite to a fault, would often feign ignorance of his adviser's methods, but knew full well the dark arts that Cummings deployed to get his master's way". In 2014, Prime Minister David Cameron, at a Policy Exchange speech in 2014 mentioned a "career psychopath", which was interpreted by several media outlets as a reference to Cummings, although the two had never met.

In 2012, a senior female civil servant was awarded a payout of £25,000 in a bullying case against Cummings and a senior member of Michael Gove's team, when Cummings was a special adviser at the Department for Education.

During his time as an official working for Gove, Cummings received a warning from the Information Commissioner's Office (ICO) for use of private Gmail accounts to deal with government business, saying it should be 'actively discouraged'. The ICO uncovered an email from Cummings in which he said: "i will not answer any further emails to my official DfE account or from conservatives.com – i will only answer things that come from Gmail accounts from people who I know who they are" [sic]. Cummings said that this referred to the Conservative Party conference, not government business.

In 2014, Cummings left his job as a special adviser and noted that he might endeavour to open a free school. He had previously worked for the New Schools Network charity that advises free schools, as a volunteer from June 2009 and then as a paid freelancer from July to December 2010.

=== Campaign to leave the European Union (2015–2019) ===
Cummings became campaign director of Vote Leave upon the creation of the organisation in October 2015. As the leading strategist of the campaign he was credited with creating the Vote Leave slogan, "Take back control" and the claim that Brexit could allow an extra £350 million a week to be spent on the NHS. His campaign strategy was summarised as: "Do talk about immigration"; "Do talk about business"; "Don’t make the referendum final"; "Do keep mentioning the Charter of Fundamental Rights and the over-reach of the European Union's Court of Justice". Board member of Vote Leave Bernard Jenkin tried to remove Cummings and merge Vote Leave with the other campaign, Leave.EU. Cummings and Vote Leave CEO Matthew Elliott left the board in February 2016 following reported infighting. The June 2016 referendum resulted in a 51.9% vote to leave the European Union. Cummings was praised alongside Elliott as being one of the masterminds of the campaign.

He advised Babylon Health on its communications strategy and senior recruitment up to September 2018. The Labour Party opposition spokesman Jon Ashworth said the links between Cummings, the health secretary and Babylon were "increasingly murky and highly irresponsible".

In March 2019, the Commons Select Committee of Privileges recommended the House issue an admonishment for contempt of Parliament after Cummings failed to appear before the Digital, Culture, Media and Sport Committee inquiry into claims of false news creation during the referendum campaign. The resolution admonishing him was passed by resolution of the House of Commons on 2 April 2019.

In July 2017, the lawyer and political commentator David Allen Green asked Cummings via Twitter: "Is there anything which could now happen (or not happen) which would make you now wish Leave had not won the referendum result?" Cummings replied: "Lots! I said before REF was dumb idea, other things should have been tried 1st."

=== Chief Adviser to Boris Johnson (2019–2020) ===
On 24 July 2019, Cummings was appointed as a senior adviser to Prime Minister Boris Johnson and was described as the de facto Chief of Staff.

On his appointment, The Guardian reported that at a conference in 2017 Cummings had argued that: "People think, and by the way I think most people are right: 'The Tory party is run by people who basically don't care about people like me'"; and that "Tory MPs largely do not care about these poorer people. They don't care about the NHS. And the public has kind of cottoned on to that".

The Daily Telegraph reported on Cummings's past rivalry with Nigel Farage from the 2016 referendum campaign, and quoted Farage as saying that: "He has never liked me. He can't stand the ERG. I can't see him coming to any accommodation with anyone. He has huge personal enmity with the true believers in Brexit".

Cummings was accused by Layla Moran of hypocrisy when, not long after his appointment, it was reported that a farm that he co-owns had received €250,000 (£235,000) in EU farming subsidies. Cummings had previously described such subsidies as "absurd", complaining that some of them were handed out to "very rich landowners to do stupid things".

In November 2019, a whistleblower raised questions about Cummings's interactions during his years in Russia; The Sunday Times reported that Whitehall was keeping certain government business from Cummings.

As is customary, Cummings temporarily resigned his role when Parliament dissolved for the 2019 general election, along with most special advisers, but was briefly reinstated to assist the government following widespread flooding.

According to Politico, Cummings played a role in the Conservative Party's victory in the election, after having passed the party's running of the election campaign to Isaac Levido. After the election, Cummings called for people interested in working in government to contact him through a private Gmail address. In a blog post, he said he wanted to recruit data scientists, software developers and economists to help improve the performance of government, making his own role "within a year largely redundant". The recruitment drive was reported to have resulted in several appointments on short-term contracts, including Baroness Wolf of Dulwich, Professor Vernon Gibson and, briefly, Andrew Sabisky. Sabisky resigned in February 2020 following complaints about his previously expressed views on race, intelligence and eugenics. Will O'Shea, a data specialist appointed through Cummings's scheme, was dismissed in July 2020 after calling for police to shoot Black Lives Matter protesters with live ammunition.

Cummings's relationship with the media has been seen as adversarial; Jim Waterson in The Guardian argued that although Cummings attempted to go to "war with the BBC, Channel 4 News and all manner of other news outlets deemed to represent the views of the metropolitan elite and not the 52% of the country who had voted for Brexit" the "half-finished cultural revolution" of Cummings and Lee Cain had "often been more bark than bite. Proposals to decriminalise non-payment of the BBC licence fee ... have been kicked into the long grass. A boycott of [government ministers appearing on] Radio 4's Today programme was meant to last until 'they better understand the country' but was dropped after a few months. When the full scale of the coronavirus pandemic became apparent, Cain gathered journalists together and promised a more cooperative attitude to fit the times." (Conservative boycotting of the Today programme in particular was a goal of Cummings's when he was a member of the New Frontiers Foundation, before he was an adviser to Johnson.) Conversely, ITV political editor Robert Peston said in The Spectator that he was the victim of social media abuse "for reporting anything perceived to have originated anywhere near Cummings", and was accused of being Cummings's personal stenographer. He also added that "one senior Tory who thought about applying to be Beeb chair" told him that calls for the BBC's "cultural re-education", which many assumed came from Cummings, actually came from Munira Mirza, director of the Number 10 Policy Unit.

==== Sonia Khan's dismissal ====
In August 2019, Cummings dismissed Sonia Khan, one of the Treasury's special advisers, without the permission or knowledge of Chancellor of the Exchequer Sajid Javid. The dismissal occurred during preparations for suspending parliament, which Cummings had planned and which would limit the time in which MPs could block a no-deal Brexit. According to The Guardian, Cummings believed that Khan had been dishonest about her recent contact with her ex-boss, previous chancellor and no-deal opponent Philip Hammond, and, according to an unconfirmed report, dismissed her after summoning her to 10 Downing Street and viewing recent activity on her phones, and then asked an armed officer to enter the building and escort Khan off the premises. Former attorney general Dominic Grieve said that the cabinet secretary should hold an inquiry and that "it was wrong of the police to get involved". Dal Babu, former chief superintendent of the Metropolitan police, said it was "a shocking abuse of armed officers" and that the police should be asking questions of both Cummings and the Prime Minister about an abuse of process. The following month, The Times reported that Cummings had "seized new powers to sack ministers' advisers", as their new employment contracts stipulated that responsibility for disciplinary matters rested with the Prime Minister's Chief of Staff as well as with their respective ministers.

Khan, supported by the FDA trade union, took a claim for unfair dismissal to an employment tribunal, arguing Cummings was pivotal to a claim of sex discrimination. The hearing was scheduled for December 2020 at which Cummings was due to give evidence, but in November 2020 a "five-figure" financial settlement of the claim was agreed.

==== Relationship with Sajid Javid at the Treasury ====
Javid "voiced anger" to Johnson over the dismissal of Khan and Cummings faced the prospect of a probe by a governmental ethics watchdog following the dismissal. In November 2019, following questions of a rift between Downing Street and Javid, Johnson gave his assurance that he would retain Javid as chancellor after the 2019 general election.

In the weeks leading up to the February 2020 reshuffle, briefings in the press had suggested that a new economic ministry led by Rishi Sunak might be established, to reduce the power and political influence of the Treasury. Sunak was considered to be a Johnson loyalist, favoured by Cummings. By February 2020, it was reported that Sunak would stay on as Chief Secretary to the Treasury, for Cummings to "keep an eye" on Javid.

On 13 February 2020, the day of the reshuffle, Javid resigned as Chancellor of the Exchequer, following a meeting with the Prime Minister. During the meeting, Johnson had said Javid could keep his position on the condition that he dismiss all of his advisers at the Treasury, who would be replaced with ones selected by Cummings. Upon resigning, Javid told the Press Association that "no self-respecting minister would accept those terms".

The Chancellor's resignation was unexpected, given Johnson's commitment to retain Javid within the Cabinet, and recent reports that an alternative finance ministry would not be made. Robert Shrimsley, chief political commentator of the Financial Times, stated that the Prime Minister's choice of Cummings over Javid at the time risked damaging the government, that "good government often depends on senior ministers – and the Chancellor in particular – being able to fight bad ideas".

==== COVID-19 pandemic ====
In March 2020, it was reported in The Sunday Times that during a private engagement the previous month, Cummings had said that the government's strategy towards COVID-19 was "herd immunity, protect the economy and if that means some pensioners die, too bad". The spokesman for 10 Downing Street decried the article as "a highly defamatory fabrication" which "includes a series of apparent quotes from meetings which are invented". On 27 April, the Guardian website reported that Cummings sat in on meetings of the Scientific Advisory Group for Emergencies (SAGE), which advises the cabinet on COVID-19 response. According to two participants in a SAGE meeting of 18 March, Cummings pressed for a faster lockdown, including closure of pubs and restaurants within two days.

A joint investigation by the Daily Mirror and The Guardian, published on 22 May 2020, reported that, following sightings of Cummings in Durham at the end of March, the police had spoken to him about breaching lockdown rules. This report triggered criticism of Cummings at the time as the government had instructed people to remain at home unless absolutely necessary, with certain provisos. On 25 May, Cummings made a public statement in the garden of 10 Downing Street, giving the following account of his actions during the time in question.

On 27 March 2020 Cummings received a phone call at work from his wife to say that she was feeling ill. After going home to check on her, he returned to work. Later that day, the couple discussed her health and thought it was possible she had caught COVID-19, even though she was not displaying the symptoms at the time. They were both worried that they would become too weak to look after their four-year-old son if he became ill as well. He said he travelled to Durham that night to stay at a house on his parents' farmland, near to their house and that of his sister, 264 miles (425 km) from his usual residence in London. He stated that the lockdown regulations allowed journeys to facilitate child care as necessary journeys and he believed that this trip was therefore allowed. On 28 March he woke up with what were clearly COVID-19 symptoms, which got worse so that he barely left his bed over the following days.

On 30 March, Downing Street reported that Cummings had displayed symptoms of COVID-19 and was self-isolating. This was three days after Boris Johnson had tested positive for the virus. In his statement, Cummings went on to say that on 2 April 2020, his son became ill and was taken to hospital by ambulance and tested for COVID-19 (the test results a few days later were negative). Cummings said he was too ill to go to the hospital but his wife went by ambulance and he collected them by car the next day, but did not get out of the car. He said that on 12 April (Easter Day) he was well enough to return to London. He continued that he drove the family to the town of Barnard Castle (30 miles away) to assess whether he was well enough to drive, as his wife was concerned that the disease had affected his eyesight. He said they then returned to London the next day.

Cummings's statement was met with scepticism from the media and the public. The journey to Barnard Castle took place on his wife's birthday. There had been additional reports of the family being seen in a wood near Durham and elsewhere in the area on 19 April. Cummings said they were not there and were already in London and had not returned to Durham.

The Mirror/Guardian investigation also alleged that police spoke to Cummings regarding a breach of lockdown rules. On 23 May, Durham Constabulary said that it was Cummings's father who had contacted them, instead of them contacting and speaking to Cummings, and that they had discussed, by telephone, matters relating to security. Following publication of the reports, the Scottish National Party leader in Westminster, Ian Blackford and the acting leader of the Liberal Democrats, Ed Davey, called for Cummings to resign if the allegations were to be confirmed, while Labour said 10 Downing Street needed to provide a "very swift explanation" for his actions. On 24 May, The Observer and Sunday Mirror alleged that Cummings had made a second trip to Durham during lockdown after returning to, and being photographed in, London. Cummings denied these allegations, and Downing Street said it would not waste time answering such allegations from "campaigning newspapers". Boris Johnson, as part of a televised update on the coronavirus situation on 24 May, defended Cummings and said he had acted "responsibly, legally and with integrity".

On 25 May 2020, Durham's Acting Police, Crime and Victims’ Commissioner Steve White asked Durham Constabulary to investigate any potential breach of the law or regulations in relation to Cummings's Durham movements. That same day, Cummings held a press conference to give his reasoning for his actions, stating: "There is no regulation covering the situation I found myself in".

On 28 May, Durham Police said that they did not consider an offence was committed by Cummings in travelling from London to Durham. They also said that a minor breach relating to lockdown rules might have occurred at Barnard Castle, but because there was no apparent breach of the social distancing rules, no action would be taken now, stating: "Had a Durham Constabulary police officer stopped Mr Cummings driving to or from Barnard Castle, the officer would have spoken to him, and, having established the facts, likely advised Mr Cummings to return to the address in Durham, providing advice on the dangers of travelling during the pandemic crisis. Had this advice been accepted by Mr Cummings, no enforcement action would have been taken." They also said there was insufficient evidence of a return to the Durham area on 19 April. On 3 June, it was reported that Durham County Council was investigating complaints it had received that the cottage Cummings stayed in did not hold the relevant planning permission.

A YouGov poll conducted after his press conference of 25 May, found that 71% of the public thought that Cummings had broken the lockdown rules and 59% thought he should resign. By the following day, 61 Conservative MPs had criticised Cummings with 44 calling for him to resign or be sacked, increasing to 98 and 45 respectively by 29 May. Among Cummings's Conservative critics was Jeremy Hunt, who said that Cummings had made multiple moves that were "clearly mistakes" and risked undermining public health advice. He said that amongst these mistakes there were three apparent breaches of the advice or rules. The first was Cummings's brief return to work before they left for Durham, the second was the trip to Durham instead of staying at home and the third was the visit to Barnard Castle. In August 2020, the Lancet published a study on the degree to which these events had undermined essential public health messaging, described as the "Cummings effect".

In July 2021, The Guardian reported that Cummings had personally contacted Paul Stephenson, a former colleague from Vote Leave, to invite his company, Hanbury Strategy, to work for the government during its pandemic response. Stephenson's company was awarded a £580,000 Cabinet Office contract to conduct opinion polling without competitive tender.

==== Departure from Downing Street ====
The BBC reported on 13 November 2020 that following the decision of Cummings's long-time ally Lee Cain, Downing Street Director of Communications, to stand down, Cummings was expected to leave Downing Street by the end of 2020. The BBC cited a "senior Downing Street source". Cummings responded by saying that he had not threatened to resign over Cain's resignation, and pointed out that he had said in a January 2020 blog post that he planned to make himself "largely redundant" by the end of the year and that his position on that had not changed.

On 14 November, The Times reported that Cummings had been told to leave Downing Street by Johnson, but also said that he was on garden leave and was working from home on Johnson's plan for mass COVID-19 testing. He was photographed leaving Number 10 with a storage box. The Times said that Edward Lister would be promoted to replace him for an interim period, but that Lister was also due to leave in January. Andrew Rawnsley, The Observer's chief political reporter, recorded one former cabinet minister as saying that Cummings had exited "without leaving much trace," while The Economist stated that Cummings had "wasted the greatest opportunity of his life."

=== Reflection on the government response to the COVID-19 pandemic ===
On 26 May 2021 Cummings gave seven hours of testimony to the Commons Health and Social Care Committee and Science and Technology Committee on the government's handling of the COVID-19 pandemic in the United Kingdom. Cummings apologised for officials, including himself, falling "disastrously short of the standards that the public has a right to expect", and said that the "government failed". Criticising government leadership, Cummings said that Health Secretary Matt Hancock should have been fired for lying, and that frontline workers and civil servants were "lions led by donkeys". Boris Johnson faced criticism, with Cummings saying that there were "thousands" of people better suited to run the country than he, and that he was not a "fit and proper person" to get the UK through the pandemic.

On the calling of lockdowns, Cummings said that Johnson had disagreed with the first national lockdown, and was against the "circuit breaker" lockdown in autumn 2020 for economic reasons. Cummings said that he heard Johnson say he would rather see "bodies pile high" than take the country into a third lockdown, which Johnson denies. Cummings also said that Johnson did not take advice and did not involve or ask the cabinet.

On 20 July 2021 the BBC broadcast an hour-long programme of Cummings being interviewed by Laura Kuenssberg. Cummings presented his perspective on events during his time at the Vote Leave campaign and during his appointment as Boris Johnson's chief aide, and commented disparagingly on the competency of government and Johnson in particular.

=== New political party ===
In May 2024, Cummings was reportedly preparing for a new political party that might replace the Conservative Party if the latter were to fall apart after the 2024 general election. However, in December 2024 Cummings met Farage to discuss the way Britain is governed. In 2025 he dropped calls for the creation of a start-up party to replace the Tories and in a blog post in March talked up Reform UK.

== Political views ==
Cummings has described his political views as "not Tory (Conservative), libertarian, 'populist' or anything else". In January 2016, five months prior to the 2016 European Union referendum in the United Kingdom, Cummings said:

Extremists are on the rise in Europe and are being fuelled unfortunately by the Euro project and by the centralisation of power in Brussels. It is increasingly important that Britain offers an example of civilised, democratic, liberal self-government.

At an Ogilvy conference in 2017, Cummings stated his belief that the EU, rather than solving issues, was fuelling radicalism and extremism due to a perceived lack of control over issues such as economy and immigration:

For me ... the worst-case scenario for Europe is a return to 1930s-style protectionism and extremism. And to me the EU project, the Eurozone project, are driving the growth of extremism. The single most important reason, really, for why I wanted to get out of the EU is I think that it will drain the poison of a lot of political debates ... UKIP and Nigel Farage would be finished. Once there's democratic control of immigration policy, immigration will go back to being a second- or third-order issue.

Cummings has frequently criticised what he sees as a London-centred political system that failed to countenance the UK's voting to leave the European Union. He has expressed his dismay that many voters' concerns, particularly in Northern England and the Midlands, have been ignored by both the Conservatives and Labour and 'taken for granted'. He criticised New Labour's attempt at re-balancing inherent structural deficiencies within the British economy following de-industrialisation with a system of tax credits.

Cummings has said he has never been a member of a political party. He came second in a list by LBC of the "Top 100 Most Influential Conservatives of 2019". Although frequently portrayed as on the right of the political spectrum, he has expressed dismay for the European Research Group led by Jacob Rees-Mogg, describing the group as "useful idiots" for the argument to remain in the EU and that they "should be treated like a metastasising tumour and excised from the UK body politic." He sought to isolate Nigel Farage from the official Vote Leave campaign in the 2016 referendum, believing his presence to not be helpful in winning over undecided voters.

Cummings has criticised United States President Donald Trump during his first term for having "demonstrated no interest in actually controlling the government" and his inability to "execute at scale and speed", and encouraged the Republican Party to nominate an alternative to Trump as its candidate for the 2024 US presidential election. He has cited Curtis Yarvin, Andrew Sullivan and David Shor, amongst others, as "people I have found interesting" in US politics. Cummings has taken a more supportive stance towards Trump's second term, describing it as "a government that’s actually trying to control the government for the first time since FDR" and praising the Department of Government Efficiency under Elon Musk.

== Personal life ==
In December 2011, Cummings married Mary Wakefield, the sister of his friend Jack Wakefield, former director of the Firtash Foundation. Mary Wakefield has worked at the weekly magazine The Spectator for decades, since Boris Johnson was editor, and is now commissioning editor. She is the daughter of Sir Humphry Wakefield, 2nd Baronet, of Chillingham Castle in Northumberland. Her mother is Katherine Wakefield, née Baring, elder daughter of Evelyn Baring, 1st Baron Howick of Glendale.

In 2016, they had a son.

Cummings is reportedly fascinated by Otto von Bismarck, Richard Feynman, Sun Tzu, and US fighter pilot and military strategist John Boyd. Journalist Owen Bennett wrote that Cummings "is a Russophile, speaks Russian, and is passionately interested in Dostoyevsky", while Patrick Wintour in The Guardian reported that "Anna Karenina, maths and Bismarck are his three obsessions."

== In popular culture ==
- Cummings was portrayed by Benedict Cumberbatch in the 2019 Channel 4 drama Brexit: The Uncivil War.
- In the 2020 revival of Spitting Image, Cummings's puppet was portrayed "as a creepy alien with a pulsating head who drools at the prospect of eating Johnson's baby". He was voiced by Daniel Barker.
- In September 2022, Cummings was portrayed by Simon Paisley Day in Michael Winterbottom's miniseries This England.
- In February 2023, Cummings was portrayed by Chris Porter in DOM: The Play at The Other Palace Theatre, London, and then again in April at Theatre Royal, Windsor and at the Assembly Rooms at the Edinburgh Fringe 2023.
