= Steve Barclay =

British politician (born 1972)

The Right Honourable Steve Barclay MP
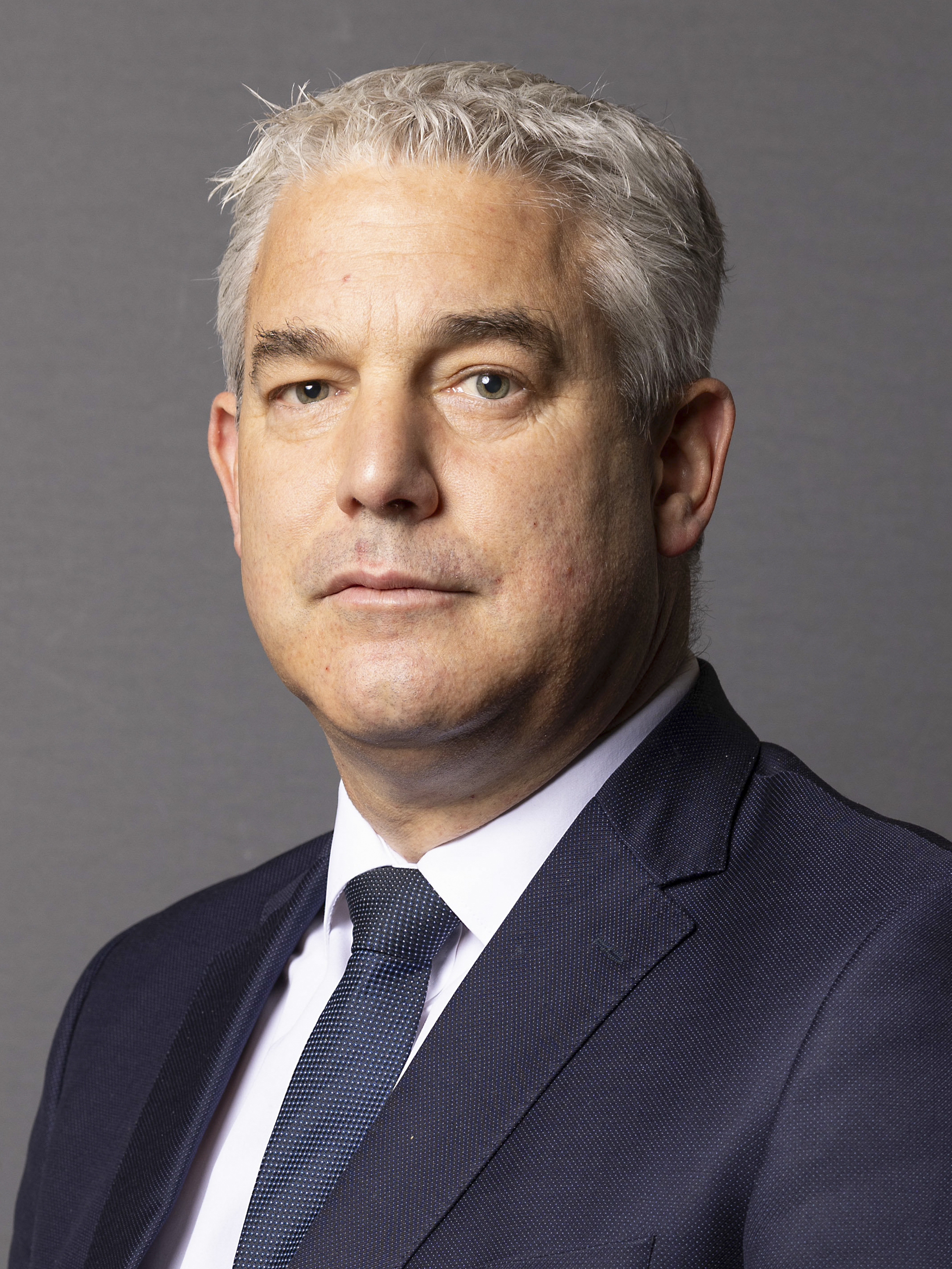
- Official portrait, 2023

Chair of the Finance Committee
- Incumbent
- Assumed office 3 December 2024
- Preceded by: Sharon Hodgson

Secretary of State for Environment, Food and Rural Affairs
- In office 13 November 2023 – 5 July 2024
- Prime Minister: Rishi Sunak
- Preceded by: Thérèse Coffey
- Succeeded by: Steve Reed

Secretary of State for Health and Social Care
- In office 25 October 2022 – 13 November 2023
- Prime Minister: Rishi Sunak
- Preceded by: Thérèse Coffey
- Succeeded by: Victoria Atkins
- In office 5 July 2022 – 6 September 2022
- Prime Minister: Boris Johnson
- Preceded by: Sajid Javid
- Succeeded by: Thérèse Coffey

Downing Street Chief of Staff
- In office 5 February 2022 – 5 July 2022
- Prime Minister: Boris Johnson
- Preceded by: Dan Rosenfield
- Succeeded by: Mark Fullbrook

Chancellor of the Duchy of Lancaster
- In office 15 September 2021 – 5 July 2022
- Prime Minister: Boris Johnson
- Preceded by: Michael Gove
- Succeeded by: Kit Malthouse

Minister for the Cabinet Office
- In office 15 September 2021 – 8 February 2022
- Prime Minister: Boris Johnson
- Preceded by: Michael Gove
- Succeeded by: Michael Ellis

Chief Secretary to the Treasury
- In office 13 February 2020 – 15 September 2021
- Prime Minister: Boris Johnson
- Chancellor: Rishi Sunak
- Preceded by: Rishi Sunak
- Succeeded by: Simon Clarke

Secretary of State for Exiting the European Union
- In office 16 November 2018 – 31 January 2020
- Prime Minister: Theresa May; Boris Johnson
- Preceded by: Dominic Raab
- Succeeded by: Office abolished
Junior ministerial offices 2016-2018
Minister of State for Health
In office 9 January 2018 – 16 November 2018
Prime Minister	Theresa May
Preceded by	Philip Dunne
Succeeded by	Stephen Hammond
Economic Secretary to the Treasury
In office 14 June 2017 – 9 January 2018
Prime Minister	Theresa May
Preceded by	Simon Kirby
Succeeded by	John Glen
Lord Commissioner of the Treasury
In office 17 July 2016 – 14 June 2017
Prime Minister	Theresa May
Preceded by	George Hollingbery
Succeeded by	David Rutley
Shadow portfolios 2024
Shadow Secretary of State for Environment, Food and Rural Affairs
In office 8 July 2024 – 5 November 2024
Leader	Rishi Sunak
Preceded by	Steve Reed
Succeeded by	Victoria Atkins

Member of Parliament for North East Cambridgeshire
- Incumbent
- Assumed office 6 May 2010
- Preceded by: Malcolm Moss
- Majority: 7,189 (18.4%)

Personal details
- Born: Stephen Paul Barclay; 3 May 1972 (age 54) Lytham St Annes, Lancashire, England
- Party: Conservative
- Spouse: Karen Barclay
- Children: 2
- Education: Peterhouse, Cambridge (BA)
- Website: stevebarclay.net

Military service
- Allegiance: United Kingdom
- Branch/service: British Army
- Years of service: 1991
- Rank: Second lieutenant
- Unit: Royal Regiment of Fusiliers

Stephen Paul Barclay (born 3 May 1972) is a British politician who served in various cabinet positions under prime ministers Theresa May, Boris Johnson and Rishi Sunak between 2018 and 2024, lastly as the Secretary of State for Environment, Food and Rural Affairs from 2023 to 2024. A member of the Conservative Party, he has been Member of Parliament (MP) for North East Cambridgeshire since 2010, and was Shadow Secretary of State for Environment, Food and Rural Affairs from July to November 2024.

Born in Lancashire and privately educated at King Edward VII School, Lytham, Barclay attended the Royal Military Academy Sandhurst and served in the British Army on a gap year commission. He then read history at Peterhouse, Cambridge, before qualifying as a solicitor through the College of Law. He worked in the financial sector while being active in the Conservative Party and unsuccessfully contested Manchester Blackley in 1997 and Lancaster and Wyre in 2001. Elected at the 2010 general election, he served as Lord Commissioner of the Treasury from 2016 to 2017 and Economic Secretary to the Treasury from 2017 to 2018. After the 2018 cabinet reshuffle, he became Minister of State for Health.

Barclay was appointed Secretary of State for Exiting the European Union by Theresa May following the resignation of Dominic Raab in November 2018. He was retained in the position by Boris Johnson and remained in office until the United Kingdom officially left the EU on 31 January 2020. Barclay quickly returned to the Cabinet as Chief Secretary to the Treasury in the February 2020 cabinet reshuffle. He was later promoted to Chancellor of the Duchy of Lancaster and Minister for the Cabinet Office in the 2021 cabinet reshuffle. In February 2022, Barclay also assumed the responsibilities of the Downing Street Chief of Staff, following the resignation of Dan Rosenfield. In July 2022, he became Secretary of State for Health and Social Care following the resignation of Sajid Javid; he was removed from the position by Johnson's successor Liz Truss in September 2022. In October 2022, following Truss's resignation, he was reappointed to the role by new prime minister Rishi Sunak. He was later appointed Secretary of State for Environment, Food and Rural Affairs in the November 2023 British cabinet reshuffle.

== Early life and education ==
Stephen Barclay was born on 3 May 1972 in Lytham, Lancashire. His father worked in IT for 55 years, during which he was seconded for three years to the company's staff association, which later became the Banking and Insurance Union. His mother worked full-time as a civil service administrator. He is the youngest of three brothers.

Barclay was educated at King Edward VII School, an independent school in Lytham St Annes. After completing his A levels, he joined the British Army on a gap year commission. He attended the Royal Military Academy Sandhurst, where he was granted a short service limited commission as a second lieutenant (on probation) in the Royal Regiment of Fusiliers on 6 April 1991. After five months of service, he resigned his commission on 7 September 1991.

After his gap year, he read history at Peterhouse, Cambridge, graduating with a Bachelor of Arts (BA) degree in 1994. He then studied at the College of Law at its Chester campus, to qualify as a solicitor in 1998.

== Early career ==
Barclay completed his training contract with a large London law firm before working successively at Axa Insurance, the Financial Services Authority, and Barclays.

After leaving university in 1994, Barclay joined the Conservative Party, when he was a member of the Conservative A-List.

In 2007, Barclay took over as organiser of the Carlton Club political dinner, which raises funds for the Conservative Party's target seats.

== Parliamentary career ==
Barclay stood in Manchester Blackley at the 1997 general election, coming second with 15.3% of the vote behind the Labour candidate Graham Stringer.

He stood in Lancaster and Wyre at the 2001 general election, coming second with 42.2% of the vote behind the incumbent Labour MP Hilton Dawson.

At the 2010 general election, Barclay was elected to Parliament as MP for North East Cambridgeshire with 51.4% of the vote and a majority of 16,425.

ConservativeHome named him in September 2012 as one of a minority of loyal Conservative backbench MPs not to have voted against the government in any substantive rebellions.

Barclay was re-elected as MP for North East Cambridgeshire at the 2015 general election with an increased vote share of 55.1% and an increased majority of 16,874. He was again re-elected at the snap 2017 general election with an increased vote share of 64.4% and an increased majority of 21,270.

=== Secretary of State for Exiting the European Union ===
Barclay was appointed as Secretary of State for Exiting the European Union in November 2018 following the resignation of Dominic Raab. It was reported that Barclay would focus on the domestic preparations rather than negotiations for Brexit. He retained his role as Brexit Secretary in Boris Johnson's first and second cabinets.

At the 2019 general election, Barclay was again re-elected with an increased vote share of 72.5% and an increased majority of 29,993.

He ceased to be Brexit Secretary at 11:00 pm on 31 January 2020, the moment the Department for Exiting the European Union was closed down as the UK formally left the EU.

=== Chief Secretary to the Treasury ===
Barclay was appointed as the Chief Secretary to the Treasury in February 2020, replacing Rishi Sunak who had been appointed Chancellor of the Exchequer following the resignation of Sajid Javid.

In May 2020, Barclay appeared on BBC's Question Time and was corrected by presenter Fiona Bruce about the number of people who had received the Government's COVID-19 testing.

=== Chancellor of the Duchy of Lancaster and Downing Street Chief of Staff ===
In a cabinet reshuffle on 15 September 2021, Barclay succeeded Michael Gove as Chancellor of the Duchy of Lancaster and Minister for the Cabinet Office.

On 5 February 2022, Barclay was appointed by Johnson as his new Chief of Staff, following the resignation of Dan Rosenfield. He became the first serving MP to hold this position. He said he would pursue a "smaller state" in his new role. Barclay ceased to hold either office after his appointment as Secretary of State for Health and Social Care.

=== Health Secretary ===
==== First term (2022) ====
On 5 July 2022, Barclay was appointed Health Secretary after Sajid Javid's resignation on 3 July. According to the editor of the Health Service Journal "never has a politician arrived in the post of health secretary trailing a worse reputation among NHS leaders".

In August 2022, Barclay announced that more than 50 new surgical hubs would open in England to help tackle a backlog of treatments following the COVID-19 pandemic.

On 6 September 2022, Barclay left the government and returned to the backbenches.

==== Second term (2022–2023) ====
He was reappointed by Rishi Sunak when Sunak became prime minister on 25 October 2022. Chief executive officer of the NHS Confederation, Matthew Taylor, said: "Mr Barclay would do well to remember that he is taking on one of the most efficient healthcare systems in the world". In April 2023, The Guardian reported that unnamed sources said concerns had been raised about Barclay's alleged conduct towards civil servants. The Department of Health and Social Care said it had not received any formal complaints about the behaviour of its ministers. On 13 November 2023, he left his role as Health Secretary to take up a different cabinet position.

=== Environment Secretary ===
On 13 November 2023 in Prime Minister Rishi Sunak's November cabinet reshuffle Barclay was appointed Secretary of State for Environment, Food and Rural Affairs, considered to be a demotion from his former Health role. Conflict-of-interest concerns were immediately raised by his appointment, as his wife was an executive of Anglian Water, one of the UK water companies perceived to be responsible for widespread and prolonged environmental damage. He also had final say on the Development Consent Order (DCO) for Anglian Water's relocation to the Cambridge green belt of the current fully functional Waste Water Treatment Plant costing hundreds of millions of pounds.

Despite these concerns, in 2024 he announced a block on bonuses' payouts to executives of water companies which are polluting rivers, lakes and seas.

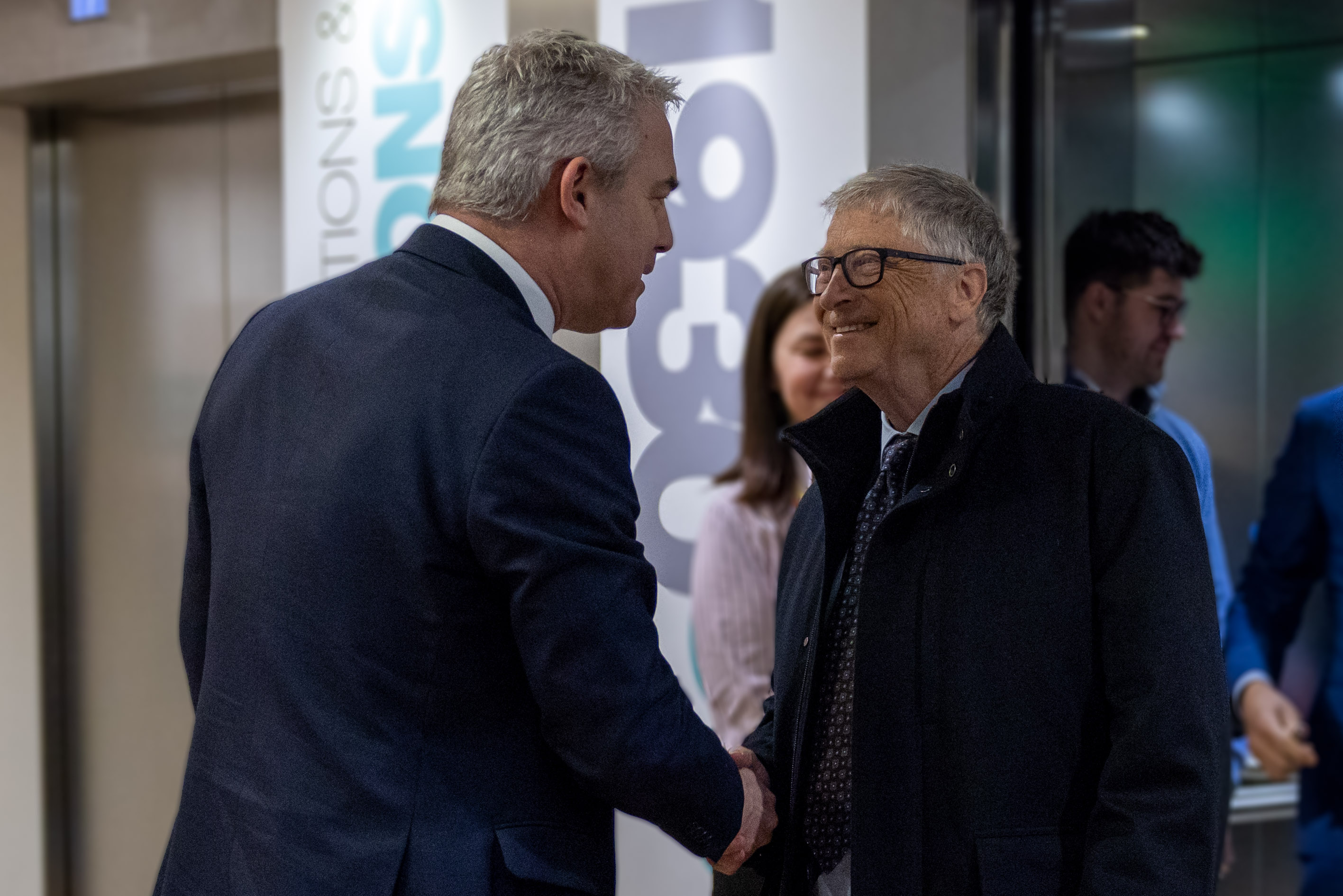
Steve Barclay meeting Bill Gates in 2023

== In opposition ==
Following the Conservative Party's defeat in the 2024 general election and the subsequent formation of the Starmer ministry, Barclay was appointed Shadow Environment Secretary in Rishi Sunak's caretaker Shadow Cabinet. Following Sunak's departure, Kemi Badenoch did not appoint Barclay to her Shadow Cabinet. Barclay became Chair of the Finance Committee in December 2024.

== Personal life ==
Barclay and his wife Karen have a son and a daughter.

Parliament of the United Kingdom
Preceded by Malcolm Moss	Member of Parliament for North East Cambridgeshire; 2010–present	Incumbent
Political offices
Preceded by George Hollingbery	Lord Commissioner of the Treasury; 2016–2017	Succeeded by David Rutley
Preceded by Simon Kirby	Economic Secretary to the Treasury; 2017–2018	Succeeded by John Glen
Preceded by Philip Dunne	Minister of State for Health; 2018	Succeeded by Stephen Hammond
Preceded by Dominic Raab	Secretary of State for Exiting the European Union; 2018–2020	Office abolished
Preceded by Rishi Sunak	Chief Secretary to the Treasury; 2020–2021	Succeeded by Simon Clarke
Preceded by Michael Gove	Chancellor of the Duchy of Lancaster; 2021–2022	Succeeded by Kit Malthouse
Preceded by Michael Gove	Minister for the Cabinet Office; 2021–2022	Succeeded by Michael Ellis
Preceded by Sajid Javid	Secretary of State for Health and Social Care; 2022	Succeeded by Thérèse Coffey
Preceded by Thérèse Coffey	Secretary of State for Health and Social Care; 2022–2023	Succeeded by Victoria Atkins
Preceded by Thérèse Coffey	Secretary of State for Environment, Food and Rural Affairs; 2023–2024	Succeeded by Steve Reed
Preceded by Steve Reed	Shadow Secretary of State for Environment, Food and Rural Affairs; 2024	Succeeded by Victoria Atkins
Preceded by Sharon Hodgson	Chair of the Finance Committee; 2024–present	Incumbent
Government offices
Preceded by Dan Rosenfield	Downing Street Chief of Staff; 2022	Succeeded by Mark Fullbrook
