= List of departures from the second May ministry =

This is a list of resignations from the Second government formed by Prime Minister Theresa May. After forming a Conservative minority government on 11 June 2017, Theresa May faced a significant number of front bench resignations. These included 16 departures from the Cabinet, including three from the Great Offices of State. She experienced 60 ministerial departures with 42 of these being resignations due to disunity regarding Brexit discord. Lastly, Theresa May herself resigned on 24 July 2019, with Boris Johnson being appointed Prime Minister by Queen Elizabeth II shortly after.

== Context and implications for government ==
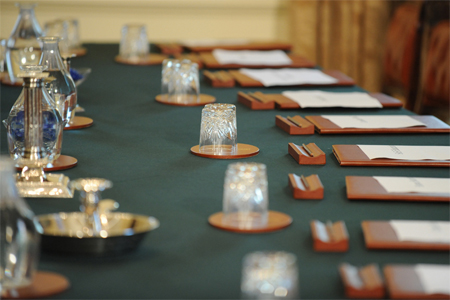
The Cabinet table

The pace and amount of resignations were described as 'unprecedented' by the Institute for Government, with resignations impacting the civil functioning of the government. For example, in March 2019 fifteen posts had been left vacant due to resignations and a lack of MPs willing to fill positions. Secretary of State for Work and Pensions Amber Rudd had to take on Sarah Newton's responsibilities as Minister of State for Disabled People as the position was left unfilled two weeks after her resignation. In less than three years, Theresa May saw more resignations than Thatcher or Blair. The resignations also occurred amid a breakdown of cabinet collective responsibility, with Chief Whip Julian Smith describing May's Cabinet as exhibiting the 'worst cabinet ill-discipline in history', as well as various MPs resigning the whip, including three to join The Independent Group of MPs.

== 2017 ==
Colour key
- Opposition to government policy on Brexit
- Due to a breach of the Ministerial Code

Minister (Cabinet members shown in bold)	Office	Date of resignation	Reason
Rt Hon The Lord Bridges of Headley (Note: Member of the House of Lords)	Parliamentary Under-Secretary of State for Exiting the European Union	12 June	Differences between May's approach to Brexit and his own.
Andrew Percy MP	Parliamentary Under-Secretary of State for the Northern Powerhouse and Local Growth	14 June	Decided to "pursue other challenges" and resigned despite being invited to remain in government.
Rt Hon The Lord Price	Minister of State for Trade Policy	3 September	Wanted to pursue 'business and writing interests'.
Rt Hon The Baroness Anelay of St Johns PC	Minister of State for Exiting the European Union	27 October	Resigned on health grounds, due to an injury sustained in 2015.
Rt Hon **Sir Michael Fallon** MP	Secretary of State for Defence	1 November	Allegations of inappropriate sexual behaviour. (Note: One of the 2017 Westminster sexual scandals)
Christopher Pincher MP	Comptroller of the Household	5 November	Allegations of sexual assault and harassment.
Rt Hon **Priti Patel** MP	Secretary of State for International Development	8 November	Conflict of interest arising from secret meetings with the Israeli government.
Rt Hon **Damian Green** MP	First Secretary of State; Minister for the Cabinet Office	20 December	Found to have lied about the presence of pornographic images on his office computer.

== 2018 ==
Colour key
- Opposition to government policy on Brexit
- Due to a breach of the Ministerial Code

Minister (Cabinet members shown in bold)	Office	Date of resignation	Reason
Rt Hon **James Brokenshire** MP	Secretary of State for Northern Ireland	8 January	Resigned on health grounds, due to an upcoming lung operation.
Rt Hon **Justine Greening** MP	Secretary of State for Education	8 January	Refused to accept a new position at DWP during the 2018 cabinet reshuffle.
Rt Hon **Amber Rudd** MP	Home Secretary	29 April	Misled the Home Affairs Select Committee during a hearing on the Windrush scandal.
Phillip Lee MP	Parliamentary Under Secretary of State for Justice	12 June	Opposition to the government's approach to Brexit. Lee later defected to the Liberal Democrats due to the Brexit policy of Boris Johnson.
Rt Hon Greg Hands MP	Minister of State for International Trade	21 June	Opposition to the expansion of Heathrow Airport; voted against the Airports National Policy Statement.
Rt Hon **David Davis** MP	Secretary of State for Exiting the European Union	8 July	Opposition to the Chequers Agreement.
Steve Baker MP	Parliamentary Under-Secretary of State for Exiting the European Union	9 July	Opposition to the Chequers Agreement.
Rt Hon **Boris Johnson** MP	Secretary of State for Foreign and Commonwealth Affairs	9 July	Opposition to the Chequers Agreement.
Conor Burns MP	Parliamentary Private Secretary to the Foreign Office	9 July	Opposition to the Chequers Agreement.
Chris Green MP	Parliamentary Private Secretary to the Department for Transport	9 July	Opposition to the Chequers Agreement.
Andrew Griffiths MP	Minister of State for Business, Energy and Industrial Strategy	13 July	Allegations of sexual misconduct.
Robert Courts MP	Parliamentary Private Secretary to the Foreign Office	15 July	Opposition to the Chequers Agreement.
Scott Mann MP	Parliamentary Private Secretary to HM Treasury	16 July	Opposition to the Chequers Agreement.
Guto Bebb MP	Minister of State for Defence Procurement	16 July	Opposition to government-backed amendments to the Taxation (Cross-border Trade) Bill.
Tracey Crouch MP	Minister for Sport, Civil Society and Loneliness	1 November	Opposition to policy rollout delays announced in the 2018 budget.
Jo Johnson MP	Minister of State for Transport; Minister for London	9 November	Opposition to the government's handling of Brexit negotiations.
Shailesh Vara MP	Minister of State for Northern Ireland	15 November	Opposition to the Draft Withdrawal Agreement.
Rt Hon **Dominic Raab** MP	Secretary of State for Exiting the European Union	15 November	Opposition to the Draft Withdrawal Agreement.
Rt Hon **Esther McVey** MP	Secretary of State for Work and Pensions	15 November	Opposition to the Draft Withdrawal Agreement.
Suella Braverman MP	Parliamentary Under-Secretary of State for Exiting the European Union	15 November	Opposition to the Draft Withdrawal Agreement.
Anne-Marie Trevelyan MP	Parliamentary Private Secretary to the Department for Education	15 November	Opposition to the Draft Withdrawal Agreement.
Ranil Jayawardena MP	Parliamentary Private Secretary to the Department for Work and Pensions	15 November	Opposition to the Draft Withdrawal Agreement.
Rehman Chishti MP	Prime Ministerial Trade Envoy to Pakistan	15 November	Opposition to the Draft Withdrawal Agreement and the government's handling of the Asia Bibi blasphemy case.
Sam Gyimah MP	Minister of State for Universities, Science, Research and Innovation	30 November	Opposition to the Withdrawal Agreement and Political Declaration.
Will Quince MP	Parliamentary Private Secretary to the Ministry of Defence	8 December	Opposition to the Withdrawal Agreement and Political Declaration.
Rt Hon The Lord O'Shaughnessy	Parliamentary Under-Secretary of State for Health	31 December	Resigned due to "family circumstances."

== 2019 ==
Colour key
- Opposition to government policy on Brexit
- Opposition to the incoming Prime Minister

Minister (Cabinet members shown in bold)	Office	Date of resignation	Reason
Gareth Johnson MP	Parliamentary Private Secretary to the Department for Exiting the European Union	14 January	Voted against the Withdrawal Agreement in the first meaningful vote.
Craig Tracey MP	Parliamentary Private Secretary to the Department for International Development	15 January	Voted against the Withdrawal Agreement in the first meaningful vote.
Eddie Hughes MP	Parliamentary Private Secretary to the Ministry of Housing, Communities and Local Government	15 January	Voted against the Withdrawal Agreement in the first meaningful vote.
Alberto Costa MP	Parliamentary Private Secretary to the Scotland Office	27 February	Asked to resign after tabling an amendment to protect rights of EU citizens.
George Eustice MP	Minister of State for Agriculture, Fisheries & Food	28 February	Dissatisfaction with the government acceding to a possible vote on delaying Brexit.
Sarah Newton MP	Minister of State for Disabled People	13 March	Voted against the government whip and in favour of the "Spelman amendment."
Paul Masterton MP	Parliamentary Private Secretary to the Scotland Office	13 March	Voted against the government whip and supported the amended motion after the "Spelman amendment" passed.
Richard Harrington MP	Parliamentary Under-Secretary of State for Business and Industry	25 March	Voted against the government whip and in favour of the "Letwin amendment."
Steve Brine MP	Parliamentary Under-Secretary of State for Public Health and Primary Care	25 March	Voted against the government whip and in favour of the "Letwin amendment."
Rt Hon Alistair Burt MP	Minister of State for the Middle East and North Africa	25 March	Voted against the government whip and in favour of the "Letwin amendment."
Nigel Adams MP	Parliamentary Under-Secretary of State for Wales	3 April	Opposition to the Prime Minister's attempt to find common ground on a Brexit deal with Jeremy Corbyn.
Chris Heaton-Harris MP	Parliamentary Under-Secretary of State for Exiting the European Union	3 April	Opposition to a further extension of Article 50.
Rt Hon The Lord Bates	Minister of State for International Development	23 April	Wanted the freedom to explore a "process for restoring our national unity."
Rt Hon **Gavin Williamson** MP	Secretary of State for Defence	1 May	Dismissed by PM after National Security Council investigation found Williamson leaked highly classified information, in contradiction to the Official Secrets Act, regarding Huawei's 5G network to a national newspaper.
Rt Hon The Baroness Fairhead	Minister of State for Trade and Export Promotion	7 May	Resigned for "personal reasons."
Rt Hon The Baroness Manzoor	Baroness-in-Waiting; Government Whip	7 May	Resigned for "personal reasons."
Rt Hon **Andrea Leadsom** MP	Leader of the House of Commons; Lord President of the Council	22 May	Resigned due to opposition to the Government's Withdrawal Agreement Bill which was set to be introduced.
Margot James MP	Minister of State for Digital and Creative Industries	18 July	Resigned in order to support an amendment seeking to prevent prorogation of Parliament.
Andrew Percy MP	Prime Ministerial Trade Envoy to Canada	22 July	Resigned over opposition to how no deal Brexit policies would harm UK–Canada trade.
Rt Hon Alan Duncan MP	Minister of State for Europe and the Americas	22 July	Resigned in opposition to the incoming Prime Minister's acceptance of a no deal Brexit.
Rt Hon Anne Milton MP	Minister of State for Apprenticeships and Skills	23 July	Resigned due to 'grave concerns' over Boris Johnson's Brexit policies.
Rt Hon **Philip Hammond** MP	Chancellor of the Exchequer	24 July	Resigned in protest at Boris Johnson's willingness to leave the EU without a deal.
Rt Hon **David Gauke** MP	Secretary of State for Justice; Lord High Chancellor of Great Britain	24 July	Resigned in protest at Boris Johnson's willingness to leave the EU without a deal.
Rt Hon **Rory Stewart** OBE FRSL FRSGS MP	Secretary of State for International Development	24 July	Resigned in protest at Boris Johnson's willingness to leave the EU without a deal.
The Rt Hon **David Lidington** CBE MP	Chancellor of the Duchy of Lancaster; Minister for the Cabinet Office	24 July	May's de facto Deputy PM resigned in protest at Boris Johnson's willingness to leave the EU without a deal, as well as believing it was time to leave the frontbench.
Rt Hon The Lord Taylor of Holbeach	Government Chief Whip in the House of Lords	24 July	Resigned independent of the "political situation" having planned to resign for a long time beforehand.

== See also ==
- 2018 British cabinet reshuffle
- List of departures from the first Johnson ministry
- List of departures from the second Johnson ministry
- List of departures from the Truss ministry
