= Philip Rycroft =

British civil servant (born 1961)

Philip Rycroft CB
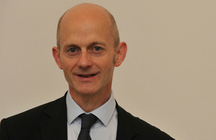

Permanent Secretary for the Department for Exiting the European Union
- In office October 2017 – March 2019
- Prime Minister: Theresa May
- Sec. of State: David Davis; Dominic Raab; Stephen Barclay
- Preceded by: Olly Robbins
- Succeeded by: Clare Moriarty

Second Permanent Secretary at the Cabinet Office
- In office June 2015 – October 2017
- Prime Minister: David Cameron; Theresa May

Personal details
- Born: 22 May 1961 (age 65) Lindridge, Worcestershire, England
- Education: Wadham College, Oxford
- Occupation: Civil servant

Philip John Rycroft CB (born 22 May 1961) is a British civil servant who served as the Permanent Secretary at the Department for Exiting the European Union from 2017 to 2019.

== Early life and education ==
Rycroft was born on 22 May 1961. He was educated at The Leys School, then an all-boys private school in Cambridge. He studied at Wadham College, Oxford, graduating with a Bachelor of Arts (BA) degree: as per tradition, his BA was promoted to a Master of Arts (MA Oxon). He remained at the University of Oxford to undertake a Doctor of Philosophy (DPhil) degree. His doctoral thesis was titled "Church, chapel and community in Craven, 1764–1851", and was completed in 1988.

== Career ==
Rycroft joined the Scottish Office in 1989. He took a number of roles in agriculture, including being seconded into the Cabinet of Sir Leon Brittan in the European Commission from 1995 to 1997. With the passing of the Scotland Act 1998, Rycroft moved to become Deputy Head of the new Scottish Executive's Policy Unit in 1999.

Rycroft left the service in 2000 to work as Public Affairs Manager for Scottish & Newcastle plc., returning two years later as Head of the Schools Group for the Scottish Executive until 2006. He then worked as Head of the Enterprise, Transport and Lifelong Learning Department for a year before being promoted to be the Director-General for Education at the Executive in 2007, during which time it became the Scottish Government.

In 2009, Rycroft transferred back to work for the British government as Director-General for Business and Innovation at the Department for Innovation, Universities and Skills, later becoming Director-General for Innovation and Enterprise and Chief Executive of the Better Regulation Executive.

In 2011 Rycroft again left the service, serving for a year as Director for Corporate Affairs at Hutchison Whampoa. He then became the Director-General of the Deputy Prime Minister’s Office in the Cabinet Office in 2012, where he served until the general election in May 2015. Thereafter he became the Second Permanent Secretary and Head of the newly-formed UK Governance Group. As of September 2015, Rycroft was paid a salary of between £155,000 and £159,999, making him one of the 328 most highly paid people in the British public sector at that time.

In 2016, Rycroft moved to the new Department for Exiting the European Union as its Second Permanent Secretary, whilst retaining his role heading the UK Governance Group. In October 2017, when Olly Robbins was moved to Brussels to personally negotiate with the European Commission, Rycroft became the Permanent Secretary.

In March 2019, it was announced that Rycroft would take early retirement on 29 March 2019, the scheduled date for the UK to leave the European Union. He was replaced by Claire Moriarty.

== Personal life ==
Rycroft is married with two sons. In the New Year Honours for 2014, Rycroft was appointed a Companion of the Order of the Bath, "For services to the UK's Devolved and Coalition Governments".

Government offices
New office	Director-General, Education, Scottish Government; 2007–2009	Succeeded by Leslie Evans
Preceded by Jitinder Kohli	Director-General, Innovation and Enterprise and Chief Executive of the Better Regulation Executive, Department for Business, Innovation and Skills; 2009–2011	Succeeded by Graham Turnock
Preceded by Chris Wormald	Director-General of the Deputy Prime Minister’s Office, Cabinet Office; 2012–2015	No Deputy Prime Minister
New office	Head of UK Governance Group and Second Permanent Secretary, Cabinet Office; June 2015–	Incumbent
New office	Second Permanent Secretary, Department for Exiting the European Union; 2016–October 2017	Post eliminated
Preceded by Olly Robbins	Permanent Secretary, Department for Exiting the European Union; October 2017–March 2019	Succeeded by Clare Moriarty
