= William Whyte (historian) =

British academic historian (born 1975)

The Reverend Professor William Whyte FSA FRHistS
- Born: William Hadden Whyte; 1975 (age 50–51)
- Occupations: Historian and academic
- Title: Professor of Social and Architectural History
- Board member of: Oxford Museum of Natural History Board of Visitors
- Spouse: Zoë Waxman
- Children: 2

Academic background
- Education: Wadham College, Oxford
- Thesis: Oxford Jackson: architecture, education, status and style, 1835-1924 (2002)

Academic work
- Discipline: History
- Sub-discipline: Social history; History of architecture; Material culture
- Institutions: St John's College, Oxford

William Hadden Whyte, FSA, FRHistS (born 1975) is a British academic historian specialising in the architecture of British churches, schools and universities. Since 2014, he has been Professor of Social and Architectural History at the University of Oxford, and he is Vice-President of St John's College, Oxford, as of 2018. Since August 2026, he has been the general editor of the Oxford Dictionary of National Biography.

== Biography ==
Born in 1975, William Hadden Whyte is the son of Bill and Marian Whyte. He went up to the University of Oxford, where he completed his undergraduate studies at Wadham College (matriculating in 1994); in his third and final year, he completed his undergraduate thesis on the Victorian architect T. G. Jackson, who carried out substantial work at the college (Whyte later told The Oxford Mail that he was inspired by Jackson's portrait in Wadham's hall). Whyte came second in his year for his undergraduate degree in 1997 (placing him proxime accessit for the Gibbs Prize in History) and was jointly awarded the University's Arnold Modern History Prize. Whyte then completed a Master of Studies (MSt) degree in 1998, and a Doctor of Philosophy (DPhil) degree at the University of Oxford; his doctorate was awarded in 2002 for his thesis entitled "Oxford Jackson: architecture, education, status and style, 1835–1924".

Whyte subsequently became a Tutor and Fellow at St John's College, Oxford, where he is Vice-President and Acting President as of 2018. He is also a Fellow of the Royal Historical Society (FRHistS) and of the Society of Antiquaries of London (FSA). In 2014, the University of Oxford awarded him the title of Professor of Social and Architectural History, He has been President of the Oxford Preservation Trust since 2017, and in 2023 was appointed Chair of English Heritage’s Blue Plaques Panel. He is also Chairman of the Oxford Historical Society and the Victoria County History of Oxfordshire.

Whyte completed the St Albans and Oxford Ministry Course in 2003, and in 2006 was ordained into the Anglican church. He served as a priest at Kidlington, and in 2017 he became an Associate Minister of St Peter's, Wolvercote.

As Senior Responsible Owner and chair of the project board, Whyte oversaw the construction of the Stephen A. Schwarzman Centre for the Humanities at the University of Oxford, the university's largest ever capital project. As of 2024 he also sits on the Heritage Committee of the British Academy as an external member.

On 20 January 2026, Oxford University Press announced that Whyte would succeed Sir David Cannadine as general editor of the Oxford Dictionary of National Biography on 1 August 2026.

He is married to the historian Dr Zoë Waxman, daughter of Dennis and Carole Waxman; Zoë is an associate at the University of Oxford's Oriental Institute and is a specialist on gender and genocide, especially women in the Holocaust. Whyte and his wife have two sons.

== Research ==
Whyte's research has centered on the constructed and natural surroundings, and their role in shaping narratives regarding contemporary British and European history. He has extensively studied the architecture of schools, universities, and churches. His publications include Oxford Jackson: Architecture, Education, Status, and Style 1835–1924 (Oxford University Press, 2006), Redefining Christian Britain Post-1945 Perspectives (co-authored with Jane Garnett, Matthew Grimley and Alana Harris; SCM Press, 2007), Nationalism and the Reshaping of Urban Communities in Europe, 1848-1914 (co-edited with Olive Zimmer; Palgrave Macmillan, 2011), Classes, Cultures, and Politics: Essays on British History for Ross McKibbin (co-edited with Clare Griffiths and J. J. Nott; Oxford University Press, 2011), The Established Church: Past, Present and Future (co-edited with Mark Chapman; T&T Clark, 2011), Redbrick: A Social and Architectural History of Britain's Civic Universities (Oxford University Press, 2015), and Unlocking the Church: The Lost Secrets of Victorian Sacred Space (Oxford University Press, 2017).
