= Ross McKibbin =

Australian historian

Ross McKibbin FRHistS FBA
- Born: Ross Ian McKibbin; 1942 (age 83–84); Sydney, Australia
- Occupations: Historian and academic

Academic background
- Education: University of Sydney; St Antony's College, Oxford
- Thesis: The evolution of a national party: Labour's political organization, 1910-1924 (1970)
- Doctoral advisor: A. F. Thompson

Academic work
- Discipline: History
- Sub-discipline: Political history; Social history; Cultural history; History of the Labour Party (UK)
- Institutions: University of Sydney; Christ Church, Oxford; St John's College, Oxford
- Notable students: Clare Griffiths; Gregg McClymont
- Notable works: Classes and Cultures (1998)

Ross Ian McKibbin, FRHistS FBA (born January 1942) is an Australian academic historian whose career, spent almost entirely at the University of Oxford, has been devoted to studying the social, political and cultural history of modern Britain, especially focusing on Labour politics and class cultures.

== Early life ==
Ross Ian McKibbin was born in Sydney, Australia, in January 1942, the son of Arnold Walter McKibbin, a teacher, and his wife, Nance Lilian, daughter of Clarence Spence, a bank manager from Bega. McKibbin's father's family emigrated from Northern Ireland in the 1860s. His paternal grandfather was the secretary to the vice-chancellor of Sydney University and the family were staunchly Protestant. When Arnold McKibbin was demobilised from the RAAF after World War II, he took up teaching at North Sydney Boys' High School until 1951, when the family relocated to Forbes, a rural township in New South Wales; five years later, they moved to Orange, where McKibbin completed his schooling.

In 1959, he enrolled at Sydney University, around the same time that his father was offered a bureaucratic post in the city's Education Department. At university, he involved himself in the Labour Club, wrote a dissertation on the origins of Australian nationalism and received a university prize for his fourth-year examination results. Influenced by a tutor, Ernest Bramsted, and his own Labour politics, McKibbin became interested in the history of the British Labour Party which, in contrast to its Australian counterpart, then embraced a certain left-wing idealism. Keen to access British archives, he completed his doctorate on the party's early history under the supervision of Pat Thompson at St Antony's College, Oxford, between 1964 and 1967. He returned to Australia to lecture at the University of Sydney between 1968 and 1969; finding, once again, that he needed ready access to British archives, he was appointed a Research Lecturer at Christ Church, Oxford.

== Career and works ==
In 1972, McKibbin became a Fellow and Tutor in Modern History at St John's College, Oxford, and remained there for the rest of his career. Between 2006 and 2015, he was an Emeritus Research Fellow there and in 2015 he became Emeritus Fellow. In 1999, he was elected a Fellow of the British Academy, and in 2009, he was elected an honorary Fellow of the Australian Academy of the Humanities. McKibbin's work has focused on working-class life and the politics of the Labour party and the labour movement more generally. In the words of Peter Ghosh, McKibbin's work "embraces an unprecedented range of the life and activities of the ‘ordinary man’; it combines the most generous human sympathies with a stringent intellectual discipline; and it embodies a radical and novel conceptualization of the recent past".

== Bibliography ==
In addition to many reviews for the London Review of Books, and an obituary of his doctoral supervisor for The Guardian, McKibbin's academic works include:

Books

- The Evolution of the Labour Party, 1910–1924 (Oxford University Press, 1974).
- The Ideologies of Class. Social Relations in Britain 1880–1950 (Oxford: Clarendon Press, 1990).
- Classes and Cultures. England 1918–1951. Oxford: Oxford University Press. 1998. Archived from the original on 15 September 2015 – via Questia.
- Parties and People: England 1914–1951 (Oxford: Oxford University Press, 2010).
- Democracy and Political Culture: Studies in Modern British History (Oxford: Oxford University Press, 2018).

Articles and chapters

- "The myth of the unemployed: who did vote for the Nazis?", Australian Journal of Politics and History, vol. 15 (1969), pp. 25–40.
- "James Ramsay Macdonald and the problem of the independence of the Labour Party, 1910–1914", Journal of Modern History, vol. 42 (1970), pp. 216–35.
- "The economic policy of the second Labour Government, 1929–1931", Past and Present, vol. 68 (1975), pp. 95–123.
- (with H. C. G. Matthew and J. A. Kay) "The franchise factor in the rise of the Labour Party", English Historical Review, vol. 91 (1976), pp. 297–331.
- "Social class and social observation in Edwardian England", Transactions of the Royal Historical Society, 5th series, vol. 28 (1978), pp. 175–99.
- "Arthur Henderson as Labour leader", International Review of Social History, vol. 23 (1978), pp. 79–101.
- "Working-class gambling in Britain 1880–1939", Past and Present, vol. 82 (1979), pp. 147–78.
- "Work and hobbies in Britain, 1880–1950", in Jay M. Winter (ed.), The Working Class in Modern British History (Cambridge: Cambridge University Press, 1983), pp. 127–46.
- "Why was there no Marxism in Great Britain?", English Historical Review, vol. 99 (1984), pp. 297–331.
- "The 'social psychology' of unemployment in inter-war Britain" in Philip J. Waller (ed.), Politics and Social Change in Modern Britain (Sussex: Harvester Press), pp. 161–91.
- "Is it still possible to write labour history?" in Terry Irving (ed.), Challenges to Labour History (Sydney: UNSW Press, 1994), pp. 34–41.
- "Mass-Observation in the Mall" was reprinted in M. Merck (ed.), After Diana: Irreverent Elegies (London: Verso, 1998).
- "Class, politics, money: British sport since the First World War", Twentieth Century British History, vol. 13 (2002), pp. 191–200.
- Entries for James Bysse Joll, Timothy Wright Mason and Henry Colin Gray Matthew in Oxford Dictionary of National Biography (Oxford: Oxford University Press, 2004).
- "Great Britain’, in R. Gerwarth, (ed.), Twisted Paths: Europe 1914–45 (New York: Oxford University Press, 2007), pp. 33–59.
- "Politics and the medical hero: A. J. Cronin's The Citadel", English Historical Review, vol. 123 (2008), pp. 651–78.
- "Sports History: Status, Definitions and Meanings", Sport in History, vol. 31, issue 2 (2011), pp. 167–174.
- "Political sociology in the guise of economics: J. M. Keynes and the rentier", English Historical Review, vol. 128, issue 530 (2013), pp. 78–106.
- "A brief supremacy: The fragmentation of the two-party system in British politics, c. 1950–2015", Twentieth Century British History, vol. 27, issue 3 (2016), pp. 450–469.
- "In the shadow of the referendums", Political Quarterly, vol. 88, issue 3 (2017), pp. 382–385.
