= David Frost, Baron Frost =

British diplomat, politician and life peer (born 1965)

The Right Honourable The Lord Frost CMG PC
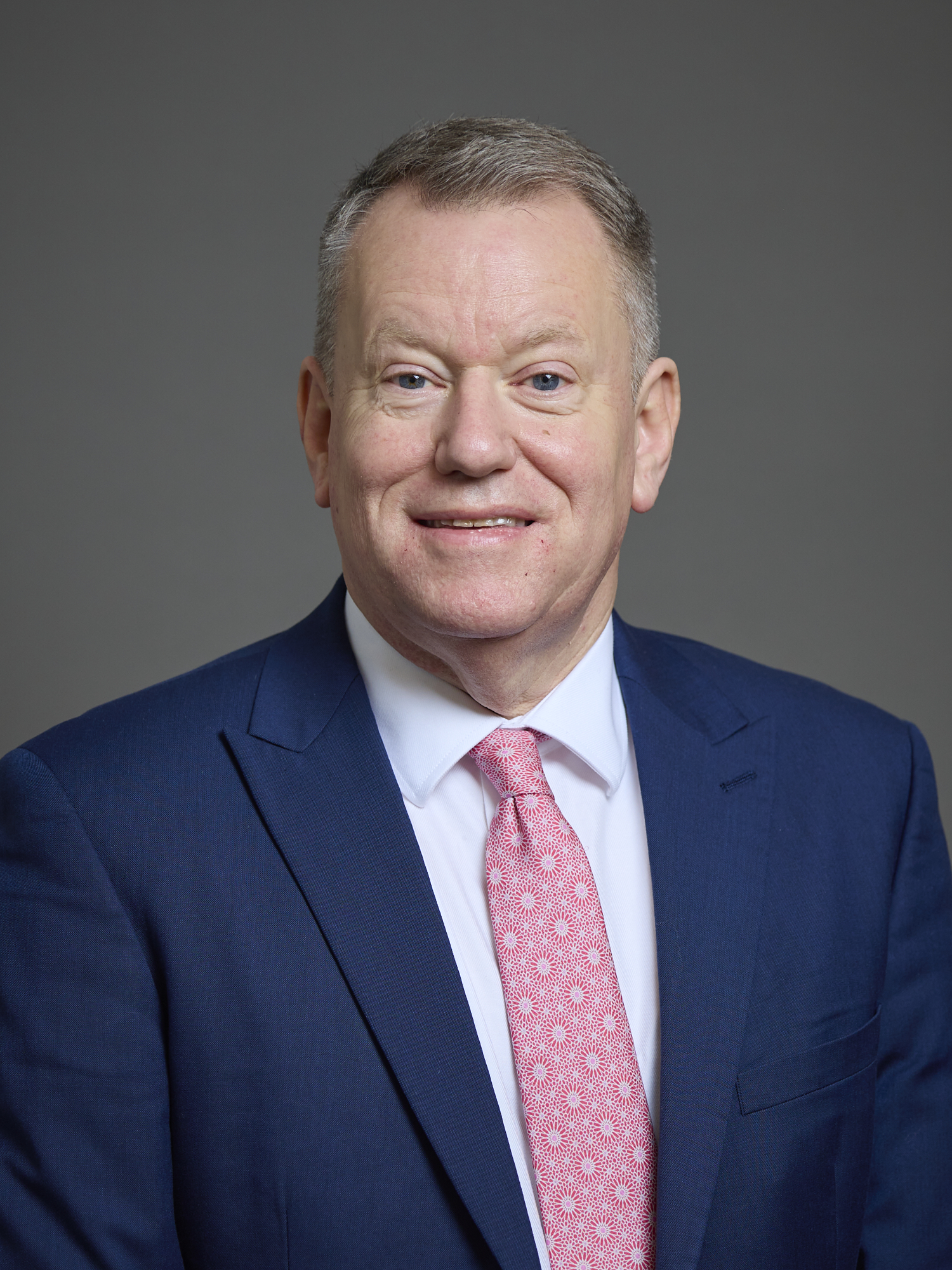
- Official portrait, 2025

Minister of State for EU Relations (Note: As Minister of State at the Cabinet Office.)
- In office 1 March 2021 – 18 December 2021
- Prime Minister: Boris Johnson
- Preceded by: Position established
- Succeeded by: Position abolished

Chief Negotiator of Task Force Europe
- In office 31 January 2020 – 18 December 2021
- Prime Minister: Boris Johnson
- Preceded by: Position established
- Succeeded by: Liz Truss

Prime Minister's Europe Adviser
- In office 24 July 2019 – 1 March 2021
- Prime Minister: Boris Johnson
- Preceded by: Sir Olly Robbins
- Succeeded by: Position abolished

Chief Negotiator for Exiting the European Union
- In office 24 July 2019 – 31 January 2020
- Prime Minister: Boris Johnson
- Preceded by: Sir Olly Robbins
- Succeeded by: Position abolished

British Ambassador to Denmark
- In office 1 May 2006 – 31 October 2008
- Monarch: Elizabeth II
- Preceded by: Sir Nicholas Browne
- Succeeded by: Nick Archer

Member of the House of Lords
- Lord Temporal
- Life peerage 12 August 2020

Personal details
- Born: David George Hamilton Frost; 21 February 1965 (age 61) Derby, England
- Party: Conservative (sits as Non-affiliated)
- Other political affiliations: Labour (1980s)
- Spouses: Jacqueline Dias (m. 1993; div. 2018) Harriet Mathews (m. 2018)
- Education: Nottingham High School; St John's College, Oxford (MA)
- Occupation: Diplomat, civil servant, politician
- Awards: Companion of the Order of St Michael and St George

David George Hamilton Frost, Baron Frost (born 21 February 1965) is a British diplomat, civil servant and politician who served as a Minister of State at the Cabinet Office between March and December 2021. Frost was Chief Negotiator of Task Force Europe from January 2020 until his resignation in December 2021.

Frost spent his early professional career in the Foreign and Commonwealth Office (FCO), becoming Ambassador to Denmark, EU Director at the FCO, and Director for Europe and International Trade at the Department for Business, Innovation and Skills. He was a special adviser to Boris Johnson when the latter was Foreign Secretary in Theresa May's government.

After Johnson was appointed prime minister, Frost was Chief Negotiator for Exiting the European Union from 2019 to 2020 and the Prime Minister's Europe Adviser from 2019 to 2021. He was appointed Chief Negotiator of Task Force Europe in January 2020. He was elevated to the House of Lords as a life peer in September 2020. Frost became Minister of State at the Cabinet Office and a full member of the cabinet in March 2021. He resigned from his government positions in December 2021.

== Early life ==
Frost was born in Derby and was educated at Nottingham High School as a free scholar from 1976 to 1983, before attending St. John's College, Oxford, where he took a first-class degree (MA) in French and history.

== Diplomatic career ==
Frost joined the Foreign and Commonwealth Office (FCO) in 1987, and shortly after was posted to the British High Commission in Nicosia where he learned Greek and was responsible for covering Greek Cypriot politics and the Cyprus problem. In 1993, he was posted to the UK Representation to the EU in Brussels as First Secretary for Economic and Financial Affairs, where he worked on issues such as the EU Budget, the economic and financial implications of enlargement to Central Europe, and the Euro. He was then posted to the UK Mission to the United Nations in New York, where he covered Human Rights and Social and Economic Affairs.

Frost returned to London to be successively the Private Secretary to the Head of the Diplomatic Service, Sir John Kerr (now Lord Kerr of Kinlochard), and Deputy Head of the European Union External Department, covering international trade policy issues and relations with the Balkans and Eastern Europe.

Frost was promoted Economic Counsellor to the British Embassy, Paris, in 2001, where he was responsible for reporting and lobbying on all aspects of French economic and commercial life, together with its EU policy. He returned to London to be Head of the EU (Internal) Department and then Director for the European Union in the Foreign Office. In this period he led work on a range of economic and social issues, notably the resistance to the initial Working Time Directive, and the negotiation on the EU's multi-annual Budget framework. He was a member of the UK's leadership team during its EU Presidency in 2005.

From May 2006 until October 2008, Frost served as HM Ambassador to Denmark and was appointed Companion of the Order of St Michael and St George in the 2006 Birthday Honours. He was then Director for Strategy and Policy Planning in the Foreign Office from October 2008 to October 2010, before being seconded to the Department for Business, Innovation and Skills where he served three years as Director for Europe, Trade, and International Affairs, HMG's most senior trade policy official.

== Post-diplomatic career ==
Frost left HM Diplomatic Service in 2013 to become CEO of the Scotch Whisky Association, a trade association. In 2015, in a hearing before the Scottish Parliament, he argued in favour of the UK's membership in the EU, noting that for a Briton on an average salary, the benefit of the UK being a member of the EU was around £1,500 a year. Frost was admitted as a liveryman of the Distillers' Company in 2016. It was in his capacity as CEO that he wrote an article before the Brexit referendum for Portland Communications, in which he supported the case for remaining in the EU's Single Market and said that leaving it would be "fraught with economic risk".

After Boris Johnson became Secretary of State for Foreign and Commonwealth Affairs, Frost was appointed in November 2016 as his special adviser, serving until Johnson resigned from office in July 2018.

In early 2019, Frost became CEO of the London Chamber of Commerce and Industry. He has also served as a public commentator on the European Union, global economic and commercial issues, and multilateral diplomacy, as a member of the Advisory Council of the eurosceptic think tank Open Europe, and between June and October 2016, through his industry role as head of the Scotch Whisky Association, as a member of the Scottish Government's Standing Council on Europe advising on Brexit.

Frost was a member of the House of Lords Environment and Climate Change Committee from January 2024 to January 2025. He was a trustee of the climate-sceptical Global Warming Policy Foundation until December 2024. The next month, he joined Net Zero Watch, which spun out of the Global Warming Policy Foundation and similarly campaigns for less government funding on climate action.

== Johnson government ==
=== Brexit negotiations ===
Frost was the United Kingdom's Chief Negotiator for Exiting the European Union during the Brexit negotiations in 2019 which resulted in the revised Brexit withdrawal agreement. After the UK left the European Union in January 2020, Frost led the UK's negotiations with the EU on a free trade agreement during the Brexit transition period.

The UK government led by Boris Johnson pursued a desire to trade freely with the EU while being subject to as few EU rules as possible, and especially not to the jurisdiction of the European Court of Justice. For its part, the EU insisted that the price for UK access to the European Single Market was compliance with EU subsidies, social, environmental and other regulations to avoid distorting competition in the single market. Another major point of contention was fisheries. Part of the impetus for Brexit was the desire of some of the British to regain full control over their fishing waters, whereas EU coastal states demanded to retain all or most of the fishing rights they enjoyed under the EU's Common Fisheries Policy.

The trade agreement, negotiated under increasing time pressure due to the end of the transition period on 31 December 2020, had to address all of these issues. Formal trade negotiations, in which Michel Barnier represented the EU and Frost represented the UK, began on 31 March 2020. They were originally due to be concluded by the end of October 2020. However, negotiations continued and formally ended on 24 December 2020 when an agreement, the EU–UK Trade and Cooperation Agreement, was reached in principle after ten negotiating rounds.

=== Chief Negotiator of Task Force Europe ===
On 31 January 2020, Frost was appointed Chief Negotiator of Task Force Europe. On 19 December 2021 he was replaced by Liz Truss, the Foreign Secretary, as the government's chief negotiator with the EU.

=== UK National Security Adviser nomination ===
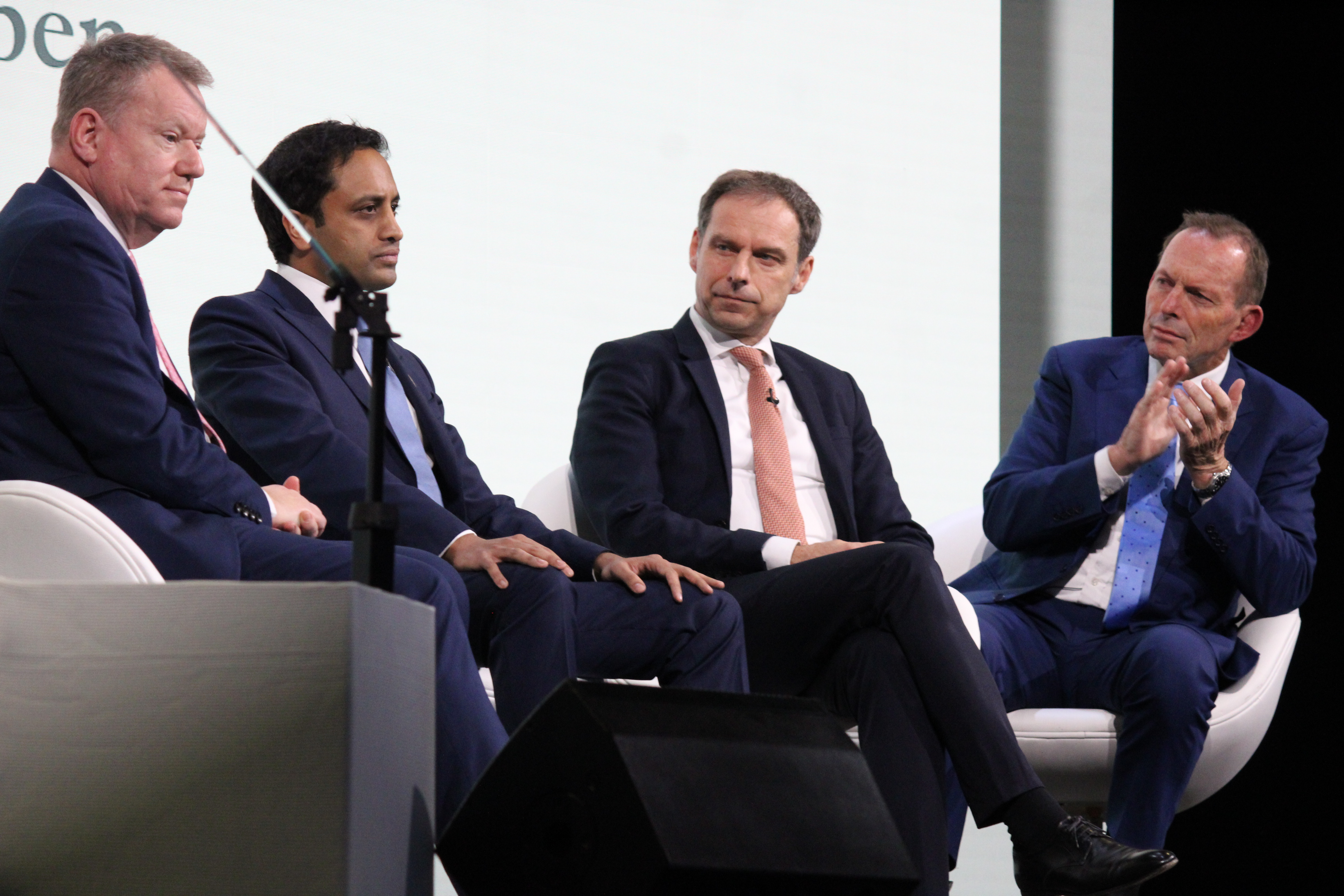
Frost speaking with Zia Yusuf, Thorsten Alsleben and Tony Abbott at ARC 2025 in London

On 28 June 2020, Prime Minister Boris Johnson announced his nomination of Frost for a life peerage and as UK National Security Adviser, succeeding Sir Mark Sedwill. The Financial Times reported that this was unpopular with military and security services, who felt Frost was underqualified. The appointment received criticism from former Cabinet Secretary Lord O'Donnell and former National Security Adviser Lord Ricketts due to concerns that the Civil Service's impartiality was being eroded by appointing a special adviser in this role. The appointment was also criticised by previous Prime Minister Theresa May in Parliament, who highlighted its political nature, and said Frost does not have proven expertise in national security.

Created a life peer, titled Baron Frost, of Allenton in the County of Derbyshire, on 12 August 2020, he was introduced to the House of Lords on 8 September 2020.

David Quarrey took over the role of acting National Security Adviser while Lord Frost was completing the Brexit negotiations.

On 29 January 2021, before he could take up the role full-time, Frost was replaced as UK National Security Adviser by Sir Stephen Lovegrove. Instead, Frost was appointed UK Representative for Brexit and International Policy.

=== Minister of State at the Cabinet Office ===
Frost was made a Minister of State at the Cabinet Office on 1 March 2021, and a full member of the cabinet. He was given responsibility for both the domestic and international aftermath of Brexit. He also succeeded Michael Gove as the UK chairman of the EU–UK Partnership Council. His first action, on 3 March, was to exempt British companies from certain regulations when shipping food to Northern Ireland. In June 2021, he wrote an article in the Financial Times calling for the EU to revisit the Northern Ireland Protocol that he had negotiated, saying the "EU needs a new playbook for dealing with neighbours, one that involves pragmatic solutions between friends, not the imposition of one side's rules on the other and legal purism" and noted the government had underestimated the effect of the protocol, even though its implementation was opposed by the Unionist parties in Northern Ireland and its text clearly created a trade barrier between Northern Ireland and the rest of the UK.

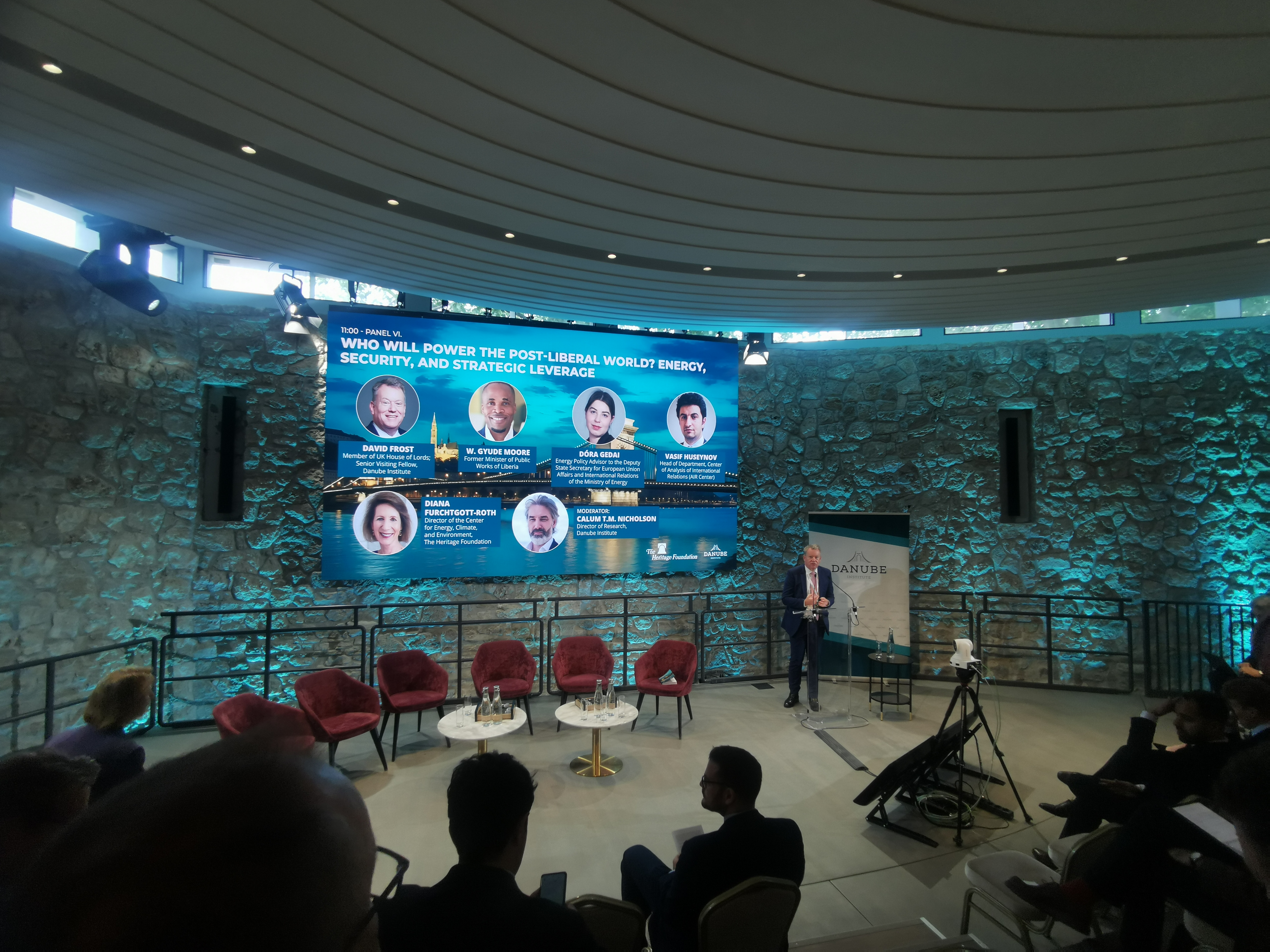
Speaking at Geopolitical Summit Budapest 2025

Frost resigned from the government on 18 December 2021, stating that he had "concerns about the current direction of travel" of the government. He cited Boris Johnson's tax hikes, net zero commitments, COVID-19 regulations, and failure to seize the benefits of Brexit as the reason for his resignation. He subsequently also criticised "the neo-socialists, green fanatics and pro-woke crowd" in Downing Street under Johnson's premiership.

Although Frost has never held any elected positions within Parliament, he later indicated that he would be willing to stand as an MP if the opportunity arose, although this would mean resigning as a member of the House of Lords. As of 2022, he listed his occupation as "peer of the realm". The Daily Telegraph reported that Frost was being urged by his allies to stand in the 2022 Wakefield by-election. In its Steerpike opinion piece, The Spectator discussed the prospect of Frost being the Conservative candidate, noting the Telegraph's support for the idea. However, he was not on the party's shortlist of candidates, the chosen candidate being Nadeem Ahmed, a local councillor.

Following the announcement in May 2024 of a July general election, it was reported that Frost had attempted to put himself forward for selection as a candidate but had been blocked from doing so by Conservative Campaign Headquarters. Rishi Sunak, the Prime Minister and Conservative Party leader at the time, denied that Frost had been blocked and said that the process of candidate selection was still ongoing. Frost would later state that he was "grateful" Sunak had clarified his eligibility for selection and that he would now "consider the options" despite it being "very late in the [selection] process"; in early June, he ultimately decided that he would not run for election as an MP and would instead remain in the House of Lords.

== Personal life ==
In 1993 Frost married Jacqueline Elizabeth Dias; they divorced in 2018. He married Harriet Mathews, a former British Ambassador to Somalia, later that year.

Frost suffers from prosopagnosia, also known as "face blindness".

He became a Roman Catholic in 2025.

== Notes ==
Diplomatic posts
Preceded by Sir Nicholas Browne	British Ambassador to Denmark; 2006–2008	Succeeded by Nick Archer
Political offices
Office established	Minister of State at the Cabinet Office; 2021	Office abolished
Orders of precedence in the United Kingdom
Preceded by The Lord Greenhalgh	Table of Precedence (UK); Baron Frost	Followed by The Lord Herbert of South Downs
