= Dianne Thompson =

Businesswoman from the United Kingdom

Dame Dianne Thompson DBE
- Born: Ila Dianne Wood; 31 December 1950 (age 75); UK
- Education: Batley Girls’ Grammar School; University of London; Manchester Metropolitan University
- Occupation: Businesswoman
- Parent(s): Ronald Wood; Joan Pinder

Dame Ila Dianne Thompson, DBE (née Wood; born 31 December 1950) is a British businesswoman. She was chief executive officer of Camelot Group from 2000 to 2014. She is currently serving as Non-executive Chairwoman of Sanderson Design Group.

== Early life and education ==
Thompson was born on 31 December 1950 to Ronald and Joan (née Pinder) Wood. Thompson was educated at the Batley Girls’ Grammar School.

She earned Bachelor of Arts in French and English from the University of London as an external student at Manchester Polytechnic (now Manchester Metropolitan University).

== Career ==
Thompson joined Camelot in 1997 and was appointed CEO in 2000. In April 2014 it was announced that Thompson would step down from the position from 31 October. Since 2015, she has been a non-executive director of Next plc.

In 2014, Thompson was among candidates considered to succeed Chris Patten as Chair of the BBC Trust, but in August, it was announced that the position would be given to Rona Fairhead, a former Chair of Financial Times Group.

It was confirmed in 2014 that Thompson had assumed ownership of The George Hotel on the Isle of Wight and that she had plans to reinvigorate the hotel and its dining offer.

From Commander of the Order of the British Empire (CBE), Thompson was elevated to Dame Commander of the Order of the British Empire (DBE) in the 2015 New Year Honours for services to the National Lottery and charitable services.

Thompson joined the board as Non-executive Director for Sanderson Design Group in February 2019. In April 2019, she became their Non-executive Chairwoman. In October 2026, it was reported that LBV Asset Management, who owns 14 per cent of the group's shares, were seeking to remove Thompson as Chairwoman. They cited concerns about the company's drift towards "inaction and inertia", specifically highlighting the group's "lavish" relocation, "poor performance" and the "unjustified" approval of substantial pay packets for executives as key issues. In response, Thompson wrote to shareholders urging them to slap down LBV's "disruptive" attempts to oust her.

== Personal life ==
Thompson married Roger Thompson in 1972. They had a daughter, and separated in 1992.

== Arms ==
Coat of arms of Dianne Thompson
Notes Arms were granted 16 November 2016 Escutcheon Per pale barry wavy of four Azure and Argent eight Roundels in orle counterchanged on a Chief Or a Lion passant guardant Gules. Motto Honesty and Integrity Badge Badge (not illustrated): An Oak Tree eradicated proper fructed Gules in front of the trunk a Circular Saw Blade Sable thereon a Rose Argent barbed and seeded proper.
