= Ruth Thompson (civil servant) =

British civil servant

Ruth Thompson (4 July 1953 – 9 July 2016) was a British civil servant who was director of finance (2000–03) and then of Higher Education (2003–06) at the Department of Education and Skills.

== Early life and education ==
Ruth Thompson was born on 4 July 1953, the daughter of the academic historian Arthur Frederick "Pat" Thompson (1920–2009) and his wife Mary, née Barritt, a lecturer in botany. She graduated from Somerville College, Oxford, with a bachelor of arts (BA) degree in modern history, before completing a doctorate (DPhil) at St Antony's College, Oxford, in 1978. While at Oxford, she exhibited a passion for politics and joined the university's Labour Club.

== Career ==
After completing her education, Thompson joined the civil service, and between 1978 and 1990 she worked successively for the Departments of Industry, Trade and Prices and Consumer Protection, where, from 1982 to 1984, she was Private Secretary to the Parliamentary Under-Secretary and then the Secretaries of State. She became Assistant Secretary at the Department in 1990 and then moved over to the Treasury two years later, before joining the Department of Social Security for a year between 1999 and 2000. That was followed by a move to the Department for Education, where she was Director of Finance (2000–03), and then of the Higher Education Strategy and Implementation Group (2003–06).

Thompson then left the civil service, but took on a number of other positions and directorships; from 2009, she was a member (and from 2015 a trustee) of the Advisory Board of the Higher Education Policy Institute; she was a governor of Birkbeck, University of London (from 2009, and later Deputy Chair of the Board of Governors) and of Staffordshire University (from 2010, and chair of its Education Committee), and also a member of the Audit Commission (2013–15), and in 2014 co-chaired the Higher Education Commission's inquiry into financing higher education; she emphasised the positives that free higher education could provide for British research. The Times wrote that Thompson was a "distinguished" civil servant, who "was renowned for being direct and fair."

== Personal life, family and interests ==
Thompson's appointment as a director of Fusion Lifestyle in 2011 reflected her love for swimming (she frequented Brockwell Park Lido); she also sat on the board of Moat Homes Limited and London TravelWatch after leaving the civil service. She was a keen traveller, visiting over 40 countries and learning Spanish while studying for her doctoral thesis in Buenos Aires. In 2004 she married the judge Sir David Michael Bean, whom she met while on a walking trip. They had no children, although she was step-mother to her husband's two sons. She died from cancer on 9 July 2016.
