= Helen Ghosh =

British civil servant, university administrator (born 1956)

Dame Helen Ghosh DCB
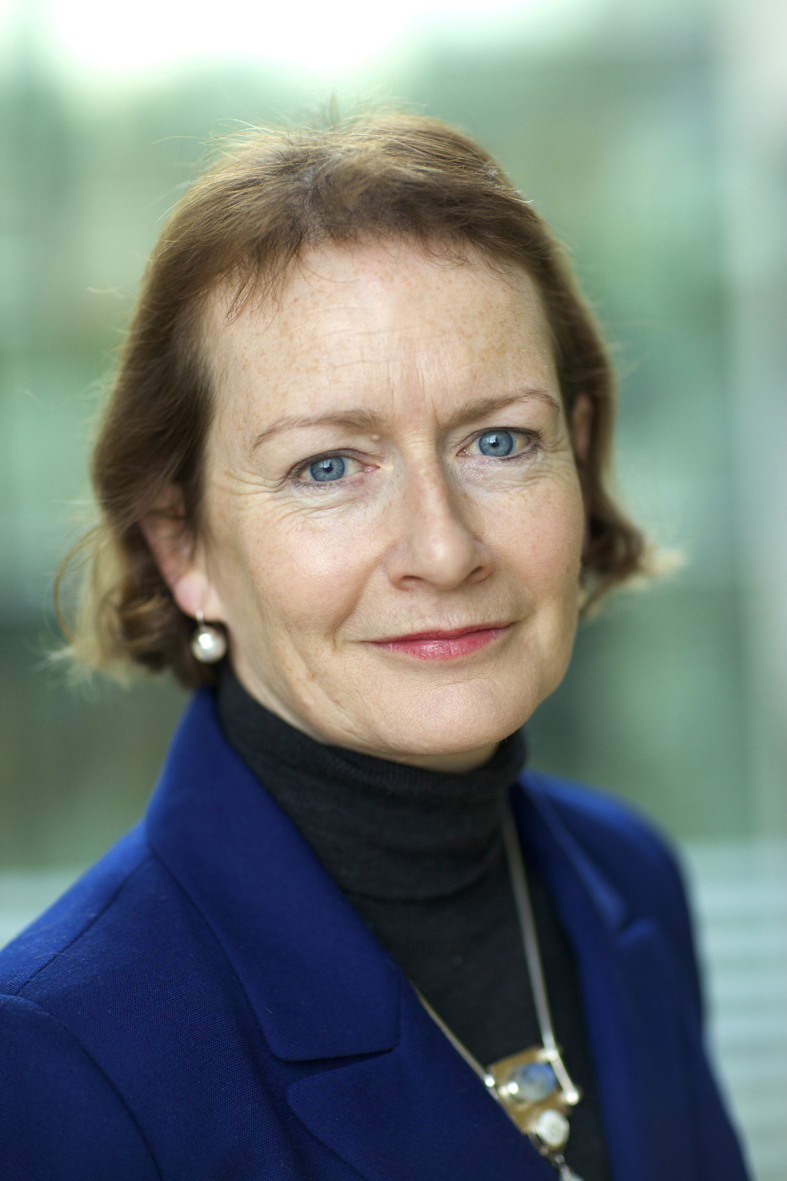

Master of Balliol College, Oxford
- In office 3 April 2018 – 30 June 2026
- Preceded by: Sir Drummond Bone
- Succeeded by: Seamus Perry

Director general of the National Trust
- In office 12 November 2012 – 2 April 2018
- Chairman: Sir Simon Jenkins; Tim Parker
- Preceded by: Dame Fiona Reynolds
- Succeeded by: Hilary McGrady

Permanent Under-Secretary of State for the Home Department
- In office 1 January 2011 – November 2012
- Secretary of State: Theresa May
- Preceded by: David Normington

Permanent Under-Secretary of State for Environment, Food and Rural Affairs
- In office 7 November 2005 – 31 December 2010
- Secretary of State: Margaret Beckett; David Miliband; Hilary Benn; Caroline Spelman
- Preceded by: Brian Bender
- Succeeded by: Bronwyn Hill

Personal details
- Born: Helen Frances Kirkby; 21 February 1956 (age 70) Farnborough, Hampshire, England
- Spouse: Peter Ghosh (m. 1979)
- Relations: William Taylor Kirkby (father); Eileen Marguerite Winifred Howe (mother), librarian
- Children: 2
- Education: St Hugh's College, Oxford; Hertford College, Oxford
- Occupation: University college administrator
- Profession: Civil servant, charity administrator, university administrator

Dame Helen Frances Ghosh DCB (/ɡəʊʃ/; gauche; née Kirkby; born 21 February 1956) is a former British civil servant who was Master of Balliol College, Oxford, from April 2018 to June 2026. She was previously director-general of the National Trust from November 2012 to April 2018.

From 1979 to 2012 she was a British civil servant. She was Permanent Secretary at the Home Office from January 2011 to November 2012, and prior to that was permanent secretary at the Department for Environment, Food and Rural Affairs (DEFRA) from November 2005 to the end of 2010. On appointment at DEFRA, she was the only female permanent secretary to head a major department of the British Government.

== Early life and education ==
Ghosh was born Helen Frances Kirkby in Farnborough, Hampshire, in 1956, daughter of William Kirkby, a civil service scientist, and his wife, Eileen (née Howe), a librarian. She was educated at Farnborough Hill, an all-girls private Catholic school.

She studied modern history at St Hugh's College, Oxford, graduating with a Bachelor of Arts (BA) degree in 1976. She then undertook postgraduate study at Hertford College, Oxford, graduating with a Master of Letters (MLitt) in 1980; her thesis concerned the history of Italy in the 6th century.

== Career ==
Ghosh joined the Department of the Environment in 1979 as an administration trainee. From 1981 to 1983 she was assistant private secretary to Michael Heseltine, the Secretary of State for the Environment. She was private secretary to the Minister for Environment and Housing from 1986 to 1988, and was head of the Housing Policy and Home Ownership Team from 1992 to 1995.

In July 1995 she joined the Cabinet Office on loan, as deputy director of the Efficiency Unit. She left the post in May 1997 to become director of the London East and European Programmes at the Government Office for London.

Between May 1999 and November 1999, she was head of the New Deal for Communities Programme at the Department of the Environment, Transport and the Regions. She then joined the Department for Work and Pensions as director of the Children's Group.

She rejoined the Cabinet Office in October 2001, as head of Central Secretariat, and, in 2003, became director general for Corporate Services at HM Revenue & Customs (HMRC), where she played an important part in the transformation programme merging the Inland Revenue and Customs & Excise to form the new department. She was appointed permanent secretary at the Department for Environment, Food and Rural Affairs (Defra) in November 2005. She replaced David Normington as permanent secretary at the Home Office in January 2011.

In November 2012, she stepped down from her role at the Home Office to become director general at the National Trust. In April 2018, Ghosh left that role to become Master of Balliol College, Oxford, succeeding Drummond Bone.

== Handling of harassment complaint ==
In 2025, a Bloomberg investigation reported that after a student publicly described a 2019 sexual assault allegation at Balliol, Ghosh called a meeting with students in which she challenged the student’s account. According to the report, Ghosh also had leaflets printed containing details of the student’s allegations, including the date of the alleged assault. An external investigator later upheld some of the student’s complaints, and the college implemented policy changes.

== Board memberships ==
Ghosh was a board member of the National School for Government, and a committee member and former chair of the Blackfriars Overseas Aid Trust, based in Oxford. She was elected a Rhodes Trustee in 2011.

== Honours ==
She was appointed Dame Commander of the Order of the Bath (DCB) in the Queen's Birthday Honours list in June 2008. In 2010, The Tablet named her as one of Britain's most influential Roman Catholics.

== Personal life ==
In 1979, she married Peter Ghosh, an associate professor of Modern History at Oxford, who has, since 1982, been Jean Duffield Fellow and Tutor in Modern History at St Anne's College, Oxford. They have a son, William, and a daughter, Olivia.

Government offices
| Preceded by Brian Bender | Permanent Secretary of the Department for Environment, Food and Rural Affairs; 2005–2010 | Succeeded by Bronwyn Hill |
| Preceded by David Normington | Permanent Secretary of the Home Office; 2011–2012 | Succeeded by Mark Sedwill |
