= Department for Exiting the European Union =

Former department of the UK Government

Department overview
- Formed: 14 July 2016
- Dissolved: 31 January 2020 23:00 GMT
- Superseding department: Cabinet Office; Foreign, Commonwealth and Development Office
- Jurisdiction: United Kingdom
- Headquarters: 9 Downing Street, London, England
- Employees: 700+
- Minister responsible: Steve Barclay, Secretary of State for Exiting the European Union (Last)
- Department executive: Clare Moriarty, Permanent Secretary
- Website: Official website

The Department for Exiting the European Union (DExEU; also known as the Department for Brexit or Brexit Department) was a department of the Government of the United Kingdom responsible for overseeing negotiations relating to Brexit, and establishing the future relationship between the United Kingdom and the EU. It was formed by the Prime Minister, Theresa May, in July 2016, in the wake of the referendum vote to leave the European Union. The department was dissolved on 31 January 2020 when Brexit took effect.

The department was formed by combining staff from the Cabinet Office’s Europe Unit, the Europe Directorate of the Foreign and Commonwealth Office, and the United Kingdom's Permanent Representation to the EU, and was able to take on staff from other government departments as necessary. The department was overseen by David Davis MP until he resigned on 8 July 2018. Dominic Raab was appointed as Secretary of State for Exiting the European Union on 9 July 2018, but resigned on 15 November 2018 over the draft withdrawal agreement. His replacement was announced on 16 November 2018 to be Steve Barclay.

== Responsibilities ==
The responsibilities of the department included:

1. Achieve the best possible outcome for the UK's departure from the EU; and build a new ambitious, deep and special future partnership between the UK and the EU.
2. Coordinate delivery and legislation across government, to ensure the UK is prepared for all scenarios, including a smooth transition to our future relationship with the European Union.
3. Engage with Parliament, Member States and interested parties at home and abroad to shape a successful exit from the EU and to help build an ambitious future relationship.

== Ministers ==
The Ministers in the Department for Exiting the European Union were as follows:

Minister	Rank	Portfolio
Steve Barclay MP	Secretary of State for Exiting the European Union	Overall responsibility for the work of the department; including work to support the UK's negotiations to leave the EU and to conduct the negotiations in support of the Prime Minister
Martin Callanan, Baron Callanan	Minister of State for Exiting the European Union	Departmental business in the House of Lords, EU ongoing business, general affairs council, JMC(E), civil society, and EU institutions
James Duddridge MP	Parliamentary Under-Secretary of State for Exiting the European Union	Legislation and constitution; citizens and networks (including justice, data and Near Neighbours); market access, trade and Future Economic Partnership; security; Northern Ireland and Ireland; business engagement (including SME champion); Devolved Administrations; English Regions; Overseas Territories and Crown Dependencies.

The first Permanent Secretary at the department was Oliver Robbins. In September 2017, Robbins left the department as the prime minister appointed him the EU adviser in the Cabinet Office. In October 2017, Philip Rycroft was appointed the new Permanent Secretary, having previously been the department's Second Permanent Secretary. After his departure in March 2019, he was replaced by Clare Moriarty, previously Permanent Secretary of the Department for Environment, Food and Rural Affairs.

== Staff ==
In March 2018 government data stated the department had 636 full-time equivalent posts, rising to 651 in August 2018 (excluding contractors, management consultants and fast streamers) on an average (mean) monthly wage of £5,890 including allowances.
