= Better Regulation Commission =

British public body

The Better Regulation Commission was a non-departmental public body of the British government, independent of any government department but under the oversight of Department for Business, Enterprise and Regulatory Reform.

Its role, according to its Terms of Reference was "To advise the Government on action to reduce unnecessary regulatory and administrative burdens, and ensure that regulation and its enforcement are proportionate, accountable, consistent, transparent and targeted". The Commission closed in January 2008 and was replaced by the Better Regulation Executive.

== Background ==
"Better regulation" had been a theme of government action in the United Kingdom since the establishment of an advisory Better Regulation Task Force in 1997. The task force was replaced by a permanent body, the Better Regulation Commission, on 1 January 2006 and the Government said it was committed to implementing its recommendations.

The task force estimated the total cost of regulation to the UK economy at 10–12% of GDP, or £100 billion, taking into account the related policy work.

The framework for action in the UK included principles, regulatory impact assessments, simplification plans, and post-implementation reviews.

== The UK principles of better regulation ==
Five principles were identified by the Better Regulation Task Force in 1997 as the basic tests of whether any regulation is fit for purpose.

Proportionality
Regulators should intervene only when necessary. Remedies should be appropriate to the risk posed, and costs identified and minimised.
Accountability
Regulators should be able to justify decisions and be subject to public scrutiny.
Consistency
Government rules and standards must be joined up and implemented fairly.
Transparency
Regulators should be open, and keep regulations simple and user-friendly.
Targeting
Regulation should be focused on the problem and minimise side effects.

The Legislative and Regulatory Reform Act 2006 was passed to establish statutory principles of good regulation based on the work of the task force. The Act obliges regulatory bodies to have regard to the principles and a code of practice.
