= Rona Fairhead, Baroness Fairhead =

British businesswoman

The Right Honourable The Baroness Fairhead CBE
- Official portrait, 2026

Minister of State for Trade and Export Promotion
- In office 28 September 2017 – 7 May 2019
- Prime Minister: Theresa May
- Preceded by: The Lord Price
- Succeeded by: The Lord Grimstone of Boscobel (2020)

Chairman of the BBC Trust
- In office 9 October 2014 – 3 April 2017
- Preceded by: Chris Patten; Diane Coyle (acting)
- Succeeded by: David Clementi (as Chair of the BBC Board)

Member of the House of Lords
- Lord Temporal
- Life peerage 19 October 2017

Personal details
- Born: Rona Alison Haig; 28 August 1961 (age 65) Cumberland
- Party: Crossbench (since 2023)
- Other political affiliations: Conservative (until 2022); Non-affiliated (2022–2023)
- Spouse: Thomas Edwin Fairhead
- Children: 3
- Education: St Catharine's College, Cambridge; Harvard University

Rona Alison Fairhead, Baroness Fairhead, CBE (née Haig; born 28 August 1961), is a life peer and businesswoman. She served as a minister of state at the Department for International Trade from 2017 to 2019. Prior to that, she was the last chairman of the BBC Trust before its abolition and the first woman to hold the post.

On 3 September 2017, it was announced that trade policy minister Lord Price would leave the government; on 28 September, Fairhead was appointed to succeed him. Fairhead resigned as Minister of State in May 2019 having completed her agreed term.

== Early life and education ==
Fairhead was born Rona Haig in Cumberland (now Cumbria) in 1961 and educated at Yarm Grammar School, near Stockton-on-Tees, North East England before attending St Catharine's College, Cambridge; she was president of the Cambridge University Law Society before graduating with a double first in law (Bachelor of Arts, BA). She later obtained a Masters in Business Administration from Harvard Business School.

== Professional career ==
Fairhead's early business career was spent at Bain & Company and Morgan Stanley in the 1980s before she moved to British Aerospace as an independent consultant in 1991. Later in 1991 she moved to Short Brothers shortly after it was bought by Bombardier Inc. She rose to become vice-president for corporate strategy and public affairs in 1994 and then vice-president, UK aerospace services in 1995.

In 1996, she became director of planning and acquisitions for ICI before joining the company's executive management team as executive vice-president for planning and communications in 1997, and continuing as executive vice-president for strategy and control from 1998 to 2001. From 2002 to 2006, Fairhead served as chief financial officer for Pearson PLC.

Fairhead moved to the Financial Times Group (a subsidiary of Pearson) in 2006 as chief executive. She oversaw the sale of several of the group's other titles during her tenure. She has also served as a non-executive director on the boards of several large corporations, including PepsiCo, and is a former director of HSBC Holdings and former "business ambassador" for UK Trade & Investment. She stepped down from her Financial Times role in 2013 after being overlooked for the position of Chairwoman of the Pearson Group when the post was vacated by the previous incumbent, Marjorie Scardino. Her leaving package was estimated to be worth over £1 million in addition to stock options estimated at over £3 million—a contributing factor to a shareholder revolt at Pearson's annual general meeting in April 2014.

In August 2014 Culture Secretary Sajid Javid recommended Fairhead as the preferred candidate for the chairmanship of the BBC Trust, following the departure of Chris Patten, who resigned on health grounds in May. Sources such as The Guardian and The Daily Telegraph reported that her appointment had caused surprise at the BBC, which had expected someone with a higher public profile to get the job.

Others considered for the post were Sebastian Coe, the former chairman of the London Organising Committee of the Olympic and Paralympic Games, and former Camelot Group chief executive Dianne Thompson. Fairhead officially took up the BBC Trust role on an acting basis on 9 September 2014, following approval by the House of Commons Select Committee for Culture, Media and Sport. She was formally appointed by the Privy Council of the United Kingdom on 8 October 2014, for a four-year term beginning the following day.

In September 2016, Fairhead announced that she would not be applying to head the new unitary board replacing the BBC Trust.

In July 2019, Fairhead joined the Board of Directors of Oracle Corporation as a non-executive director. She joined the Board of RS Group plc ( formerly Electrocomponents plc) in November 2020, stepping up as Chair in January 2021.

In February 2023, she was named a member of the McKinsey & Company External Advisory Group.

== Appearance before Public Accounts Committee ==
In March 2015 Fairhead appeared before the Public Accounts Committee of the House of Commons as a non-executive director of the Swiss subsidiary of HSBC. Margaret Hodge, the chair of the committee, stated that in the light of her performance as an HSBC director, she was no longer fit to continue in her role heading the BBC Trust. Hodge was accused of making a "bullying" attack.

== Ministerial and parliamentary career ==
On 28 September 2017 the government announced that Fairhead would become an unpaid Minister of State at the Department for International Trade, succeeding Mark, Lord Price. In addition, it was announced that Fairhead would be granted a life peerage. On 19 October, she was created Baroness Fairhead, of Yarm in the County of North Yorkshire.

Baroness Fairhead resigned her ministerial position on 7 May 2019.

== Personal life ==
Baroness Fairhead's husband, Thomas Edwin Fairhead, is a businessman and director of Campbell Lutyens. He was a Conservative councillor for Earl's Court in West London from 1994 to 2010. He now serves as an honorary alderman of the Royal Borough of Kensington and Chelsea. The couple have three children.

Rona Fairhead is a qualified pilot and her hobbies include flying and scuba diving. Towards the end of her tenure with the Financial Times Group, Fairhead was treated for breast cancer. She was appointed a Commander of the Order of the British Empire (CBE) in the 2012 New Year's Honours List for "services to UK Industry".

Media offices
Preceded by Diane Coyle as Acting Chair of the BBC Trust	Chair of the BBC Trust; 9 October 2014 – 2 April 2017	Succeeded by David Clementi as Chair of the BBC Board
