= Clare Griffiths (historian) =

Academic

Clare Victoria Joanne Griffiths, FRHistS, is a historian and academic. Since 2016, she has held the Chair in Modern History at Cardiff University.

== Career ==
Clare Victoria Joanne Griffiths read modern history at Merton College, Oxford, graduating with a Bachelor of Arts degree. She carried on there to complete her doctoral studies under Ross McKibbin's supervision; her DPhil was awarded in 1996 for her thesis "Labour and the countryside: rural strands in the British Labour movement, 1900–1939". Alongside lecturing at the University of Reading, Griffiths then spent four years at Wadham College, Oxford, as Pat Thompson Junior Research Fellow. In 1999, she joined the University of Sheffield as a lecturer, and eventually secured promotion to a senior lectureship. In 2016, she moved to Cardiff University to take up a chair in modern history.

Griffiths's research encompasses aspects of modern British political and cultural history. She is particularly interested in British left-wing politics (especially the Labour Party) in the interwar period, as well as British rural society, politics and political culture between the World Wars, agriculture in interwar Britain, land use and land policy, and interwar Englishness, literature and art.

As of 2018, Griffiths is a Fellow of the Royal Historical Society (FRHistS).

== Selected publications ==
- Labour and the Countryside: The Politics of Rural Britain, 1918–1939 (Oxford University Press, 2007).
- (Co-editor with James J. Nott and William Whyte) Classes, Cultures and Politics: Essays on British History for Ross McKibbin (Oxford University Press, 2011).
