= Peter Ghosh =

British historian (born 1954)

Professor Peter Ghosh
- Born: Peter R. Ghosh; 1954 (age 71–72); Sutton Coldfield, West Midlands, England
- Occupations: Historian and academic
- Title: Professor of the History of Ideas
- Spouse: Helen Kirkby (m. 1979)
- Children: 2

Academic background
- Education: Merton College, Oxford; Nuffield College, Oxford
- Doctoral advisor: A. F. Thompson

Academic work
- Discipline: History
- Sub-discipline: 20th century history; Intellectual history
- Institutions: Nuffield College, Oxford; St Anne's College, Oxford

Peter R. Ghosh (/ɡəʊʃ/; gauche; born December 1954, Sutton Coldfield) is a British historian, specialising in the history of ideas and historiography. He was Jean Duffield Fellow in Modern History at St Anne's College, Oxford, and Professor of the History of Ideas at the Faculty of History, University of Oxford.

== Career ==
Ghosh read Modern History at Merton College, Oxford as an undergraduate and continued his studies at graduate level at Nuffield College, Oxford, later becoming a Junior Research Fellow there. His abandoned doctoral thesis on Victorian finance was supervised by A. F. Thompson.

Ghosh was Jean Duffield Fellow in Modern History at St Anne's College, Oxford from 1982 to his retirement in 2023. In January 2022 he was awarded the Title of Distinction of Professor of the History of Ideas by the University of Oxford.

After retiring he became a Senior Research Fellow at St Anne's College and continued to teach modern history at Jesus College.

He has two related research interests: first, the interface between political ideas and English politics, c. 1850 – 1895; secondly, the evolution of Western European and British ideas, including historiography, from the Enlightenment to the present.

He has written for the London Review of Books and appeared on In Our Time discussing Max Weber. He also sits on the international advisory board of the journal History of European Ideas.

== Personal life ==
Ghosh married Helen Kirkby, whom he met as a fellow History undergraduate at Oxford, in 1979. They have two children together. Their son William is an English tutor at Christ Church, Oxford.

== Works ==
- Politics and Culture in Victorian Britain: Essays in Memory of Colin Matthew (2006)
- A Historian Reads Max Weber: Essays on the Protestant Ethic (2008)
- Max Weber and 'The Protestant Ethic': Twin Histories (2014)
- Max Weber in Context: Essays in the History of German Ideas C. 1870–1930 (2016)
