= Bronwyn Hill =

British civil servant (born 1960)

Bronwyn Hill CBE
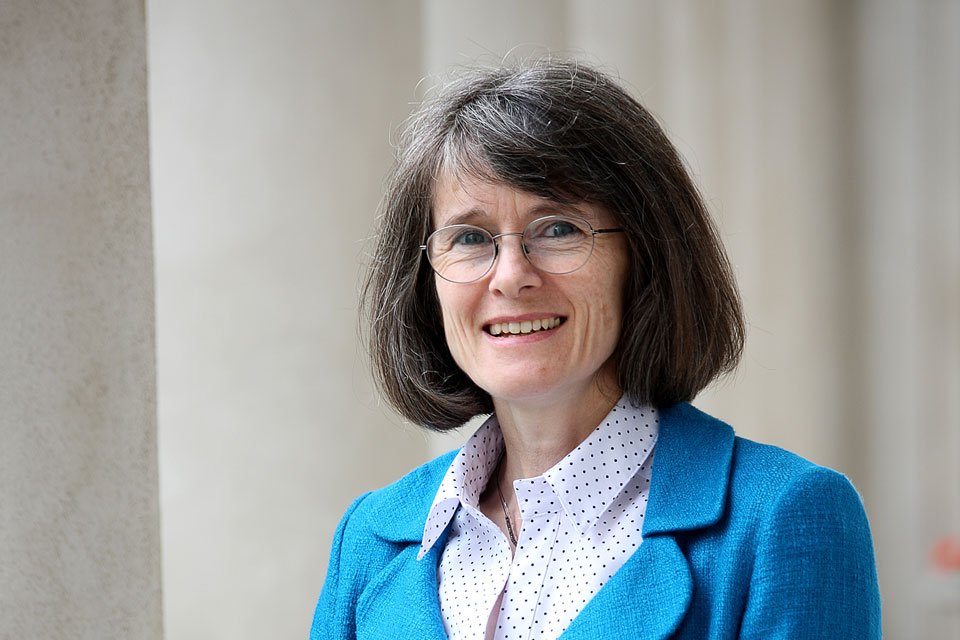

Permanent Under-Secretary of State for Environment, Food and Rural Affairs
- In office 28 March 2011 – 31 July 2015
- Secretary of State: Caroline Spelman; Owen Paterson; Liz Truss
- Preceded by: Dame Helen Ghosh
- Succeeded by: Clare Moriarty

Personal details
- Born: 1960 (age 65–66) Bradford, England, United Kingdom
- Education: Girton College, Cambridge
- Occupation: Civil Servant

Bronwyn Hill CBE (born 1960) is a British former civil servant, who served as the Permanent Secretary of the Department for Environment, Food and Rural Affairs.

Hill was born in Bradford in 1960 and educated at St Anthony's School and St Joseph's College, Bradford, and at Girton College, Cambridge, where she graduated with a degree in geography. She was appointed a CBE in the 2001 New Year Honours List.

Hill joined the Greater London Council (GLC) in 1981, where she worked on transport planning policy. When the GLC was abolished in 1986, she moved to the Inner London Education Authority and then joined the Department of Transport (later the Department for the Environment, Transport and the Regions and then Department for Transport, Local Government and the Regions) in 1988. Between 2005 and 2007, she was regional director at the Government Office for the South West before returning to what was now the Department for Transport.

She was appointed Permanent Secretary of the Department for Environment, Food and Rural Affairs in March 2011. Her appointment brought the number of female permanent secretaries to eight of the 16 government departments for the first time. She stepped down as permanent secretary in the summer of 2015.

Hill was appointed to the board of the Office for Nuclear Regulation in 2016 for a four-year term. She joined The Royal Parks Board in 2016 and was reappointed for a further four years in 2021. She joined the Governing Body of the University of Greenwich in 2017, becoming chair in 2020.

Government offices
Preceded by Dame Helen Ghosh	Permanent Secretary of the Department for Environment, Food and Rural Affairs; 2011–2015	Succeeded by Clare Moriarty
