= Mark Price, Baron Price =

British businessperson

The Right Honourable The Lord Price CVO
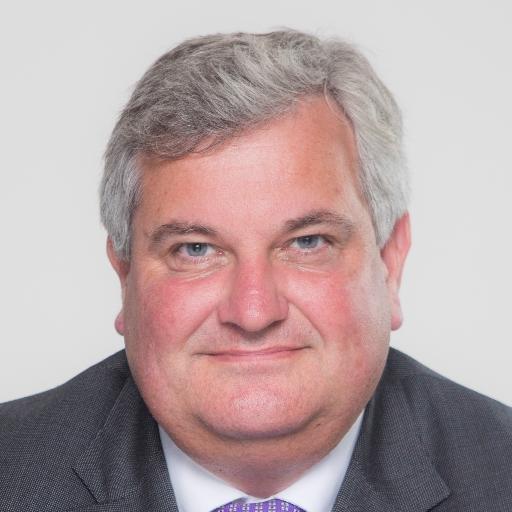

Minister of State for Trade and Investment
- In office 4 April 2016 – 28 September 2017
- Prime Minister: David Cameron; Theresa May
- Preceded by: The Lord Maude of Horsham
- Succeeded by: The Baroness Fairhead

Member of the House of Lords
- Lord Temporal
- Life peerage 29 February 2016

Personal details
- Born: 2 March 1961 (age 65) Crewe, England
- Party: Conservative
- Spouse: Judith Bolt
- Children: Two
- Education: London Business School; Lancaster University
- Occupation: Businessman

Mark Ian Price, Baron Price CVO (born 2 March 1961) is a British businessman, Founder of WorkL for Business and WorkL, Chairman of Fair Trade UK, writer, President of the Chartered Management Institute and member of the House of Lords. He was a former Managing Director of Waitrose, and Deputy Chairman of the John Lewis Partnership. He joined the Conservative government as the Minister of State for Trade and Investment in April 2016.

On 3 September 2017 it was announced that Price would leave the government; on 28 September Rona Fairhead was appointed to succeed him.

== Early life ==
Price was born and grew up in Crewe, England. His father was a corner shop owner, later a wholesaler, and an evangelical preacher. He attended Crewe County Grammar School for Boys.

In 1982 Price graduated from Lancaster University with a 2:1 BA degree in Archaeology.

In 1984 Price married Judith Bolt at Christchurch Priory in Dorset.

== Career ==
He started his career at the John Lewis Partnership as a graduate trainee in 1982, before progressing to become John Lewis store manager in High Wycombe and Cheadle. In 2005, he joined the John Lewis Partnership Board taking on responsibility for strategy as Development Director. In April 2007, the then Managing Director Steven Esom left the Partnership, and Price was appointed as his replacement. At the time Waitrose had 183 stores, and within six years this number had increased to 300.

In 2013 it was announced that in addition to his position at Waitrose he would become Deputy Chairman of the John Lewis Partnership, replacing David Barclay who had held the position since 2006.

In October 2015 Price announced he was to leave the John Lewis Partnership in April 2016 after 10 years fulfilling the role of Managing Director of Waitrose. Suggestions had been made saying that Mark may apply for the chairman position of Channel 4.

In February 2016 it was announced that Price would become the new Minister of State for Trade, after the resignation of Lord Maude of Horsham, and that he would be made a life peer. On 29 February, he was created Lord Price, of Sturminster Newton in the County of Dorset. He left the Government in September 2017.

Since 2018 Price has been on the Council at Lancaster University and Chair of Fairtrade UK .

Price has sat on Coca-Cola Europe's board since 2019.

Price became President of the Chartered Management Institute in September 2020.

In October 2017, Price founded Engaging Business and WorkL, digital platforms designed to make the world a little happier and help businesses increase employee retention by measuring, tracking and improving organisations' workplace happiness; it offers happiness surveys and career development opportunities for individuals and businesses.

== Other work ==
Price has served as Chairman of Business in the Community since 2011 and The Prince's Countryside Fund since 2010. He sits on the Board of Directors of Channel 4 and the Consumer Goods Forum. He was appointed Commander of the Royal Victorian Order (CVO) in the 2014 New Year Honours for his work with Business in the Community and The Prince's Countryside Fund. Price is also a Life Patron at GroceryAid.

Price has written a number of books on employee engagement including 'Six Steps to Workplace Happiness' and 'Fairness for All'. Price has written a book to help children learn to play chess called The Foolish King. The Foolish King website helps children learn how to play chess in a fun and exciting way.

== Personal life ==
In 1991 Price married Judith Bolt in the London Borough of Richmond upon Thames. They live in Sturminster Newton with their two daughters.

Business positions
| Preceded by Steven Esom | Managing Director of Waitrose; 2007–2016 | Succeeded by Incumbent |
| Preceded by David Barclay | Non-Executive Deputy Chairman of the John Lewis Partnership; 2013–2016 | Succeeded by Incumbent |
Political offices
| Preceded by The Lord Maude of Horsham | Minister of State for Trade and Investment; 2016–2017 | Succeeded by Rona Fairhead |
Orders of precedence in the United Kingdom
| Preceded by The Lord Bird | Gentlemen; Baron Price | Followed by The Lord Gadhia |
