= Clare Moriarty =

British civil servant

Dame Clare Moriarty DCB
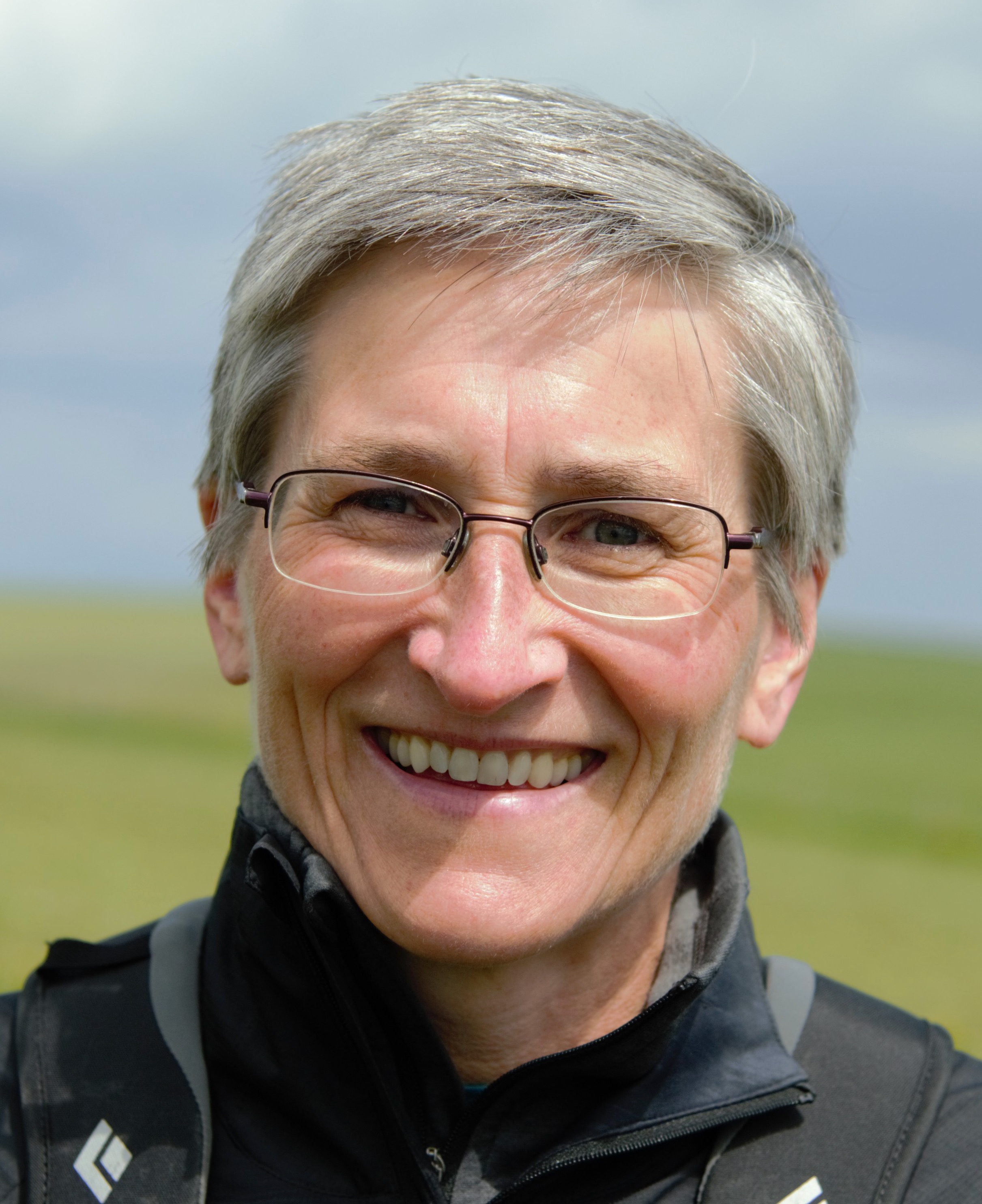

Chief Executive of Citizens Advice
- Incumbent
- Assumed office April 2021

Permanent Secretary for the Department for Exiting the European Union
- In office 29 March 2019 – 31 January 2020
- Prime Minister: Theresa May; Boris Johnson
- Sec. of State: Steve Barclay
- Preceded by: Philip Rycroft
- Succeeded by: Position abolished

Permanent Secretary for the Department for Environment, Food and Rural Affairs
- In office 3 August 2015 – 29 March 2019
- Prime Minister: David Cameron; Theresa May
- Sec. of State: Liz Truss; Andrea Leadsom; Michael Gove
- Preceded by: Bronwyn Hill
- Succeeded by: Tamara Finkelstein

Personal details
- Born: 6 April 1963 (age 63) England
- Education: Balliol College, Oxford
- Occupation: Civil Servant
- Moriarty's voice recorded January 2017

Dame Clare Moriarty DCB (born 6 April 1963) is the Chief Executive of Citizens Advice and a former British civil servant, who served as permanent secretary of the Department for Environment, Food and Rural Affairs between 2015 and 2019 and as Permanent Secretary of the Department for Exiting the European Union (DExEU) from March 2019 until January 2020. In November 2017, she was appointed the first civil service “faith and belief” champion, to represent all faiths and beliefs and promote interfaith dialogue. After leaving the Civil Service when DExEU was closed, she took up a new role as chief executive of Citizens Advice in April 2021.

== Early life and education ==
Moriarty was born on 6 April 1963. She is the daughter of Michael John Moriarty, a career civil servant. She was educated at North London Collegiate School, an all-girls private school in London. She studied mathematics at Balliol College, Oxford, graduating with a Bachelor of Arts (BA) degree in 1985.

== Career ==
Moriarty held roles in the Department of Health, the Ministry of Justice, Department for Transport (DfT) and the Department for Environment, Food and Rural Affairs (Defra). At the DfT, she was Director General Corporate Group and, from January 2013, Director General for Rail. She was appointed Permanent Secretary for the Department for Environment, Food and Rural Affairs in August 2015. As of 2015, Moriarty was paid a salary of between £160,000 and £164,999 by the department, making her one of the 328 most highly paid people in the British public sector at that time.

Moriarty advocates the use of Twitter by civil servants, and has written in The Guardian how Twitter can be used in particular by senior female staff to be seen as more accessible.

In March 2019, she left her role as Permanent Secretary at the Department of Environment, Food and Rural Affairs and became Permanent Secretary at the Department for Exiting the European Union, replacing Philip Rycroft. Following the departure of the United Kingdom from the EU at the end of January 2020 and the closure of the Department for Exiting the European Union, Moriarty left the civil service in March 2020. She took up a role as chief executive of Citizens Advice in April 2021.

== Honours ==
Moriarty was appointed Companion of the Order of the Bath (CB) in the 2016 New Year Honours, and Dame Commander of the Order of the Bath (DCB) in the 2020 Birthday Honours.

Government offices
| Preceded by Bronwyn Hill | Permanent Secretary of the Department for Environment, Food and Rural Affairs; 2015–2019 | Succeeded by Tamara Finkelstein |
| Preceded by Philip Rycroft | Permanent Secretary of the Department for Exiting the European Union; 2019 | Succeeded by Department abolished |
