= Secretary of State for Exiting the European Union =

Former British Cabinet position

- Royal Arms of Her Majesty's Government
- Department for Exiting the European Union
- Style: Brexit Secretary (informal); The Right Honourable (within the UK and the Commonwealth)
- Member of: Cabinet
- Reports to: Prime Minister of the United Kingdom
- Seat: Westminster, London
- Appointer: The Monarch; on advice of the Prime Minister
- Term length: At Her Majesty's pleasure
- Formation: 13 July 2016
- First holder: David Davis
- Final holder: Steve Barclay
- Abolished: 31 January 2020

The Secretary of State for Exiting the European Union or, informally, Brexit Secretary, was a secretary of state in the Government of the United Kingdom, responsible for the business of the Department for Exiting the European Union, as well as for the UK's withdrawal from the European Union (EU), informally referred to as "Brexit". The secretary of state oversaw Brexit negotiations following a 2016 referendum, in which a majority of those who voted were in favour of exiting the EU. The officeholder was a member of the Cabinet.

The position was created on 13 July 2016, at the outset of the premiership of Theresa May. The office was abolished on 31 January 2020, during the premiership of Boris Johnson, as the United Kingdom left the European Union. A new cabinet position of Minister of State for Brexit Opportunities and Government Efficiency was later created.

The Minister of State for Exiting the European Union deputised for the secretary of state. The corresponding shadow minister was the Shadow Secretary of State for Exiting the European Union. The secretary of state was also scrutinised by the Exiting the European Union Select Committee.

This page also includes the portfolios of the Chief Negotiator for Exiting the European Union and Parliamentary Under-Secretary of State for Exiting the European Union.

== History ==
May reportedly ordered civil servants to find a building to house a new Department for Exiting the European Union, to be headed by the secretary of state. The headquarters of the Department of Energy and Climate Change (DECC) at Whitehall Place, which was to be vacated once the DECC was merged into the newly created Department for Business, Energy and Industrial Strategy, was viewed as a potential site for the department. The department later occupied 9 Downing Street.

The inaugural holder was David Davis MP, a longtime Eurosceptic who campaigned for the UK to leave the EU. Davis is a former chairman of the Conservative Party who served in the government of John Major as Minister of State for Europe (1994–97) and in the Shadow Cabinet of David Cameron as shadow home secretary.

Davis resigned on 8 July 2018 shortly before midnight; Dominic Raab was appointed on 9 July as his replacement and resigned on 15 November 2018. Steve Barclay, who had been serving as Minister of State for Health, was selected as Raab's successor on 16 November 2018.

== List of secretaries of state for exiting the European Union (Brexit secretaries) ==
Colour key (for political parties):
Conservative

Portrait	Name	Term of office		Length of term	Party	Prime Minister	Ref.
	David Davis; MP for Haltemprice and Howden	13 July 2016	8 July 2018	1 year, 11 months and 25 days	Conservative	Theresa May	
	Dominic Raab; MP for Esher and Walton	9 July 2018	15 November 2018	4 months and 6 days	Conservative	Theresa May	
	Steve Barclay; MP for North East Cambridgeshire	16 November 2018	31 January 2020	1 year, 2 months and 15 days	Conservative	Theresa May	
	Steve Barclay; MP for North East Cambridgeshire	16 November 2018	31 January 2020	1 year, 2 months and 15 days	Conservative	Boris Johnson	

== List of chief negotiators for exiting the European Union ==
Colour key (for political parties):
Conservative

Portrait	Name	Term of office		Length of term	Party	Prime Minister
	David Davis; MP for Haltemprice and Howden	13 July 2016	18 September 2017	1 year, 2 months and 5 days	Conservative	Theresa May
	Olly Robbins; Prime Minister's Europe Adviser	18 September 2017	24 July 2019	1 year, 10 months and 6 days	Civil service	Theresa May
	David Frost; Prime Minister's Europe Adviser	29 July 2019	31 January 2020	6 months and 2 days	Civil service	Boris Johnson

== List of ministers of state for exiting the European Union ==
Colour key (for political parties):

Conservative

Portrait	Name	Term of office		Length of term	Party	Prime Minister
	David Jones; MP for Clwyd West	17 July 2016	12 June 2017	10 months and 26 days	Conservative	Theresa May
	Joyce Anelay, Baroness Anelay of St Johns	12 June 2017	27 October 2017	4 months and 15 days	Conservative	Theresa May
	Martin Callanan, Baron Callanan	27 October 2017	31 January 2020	2 years, 3 months and 4 days	Conservative	Theresa May
	Martin Callanan, Baron Callanan	27 October 2017	31 January 2020	2 years, 3 months and 4 days	Conservative	Boris Johnson

== List of parliamentary under-secretaries of state for exiting the European Union ==
Colour key (for political parties):
Conservative

Portrait	Name	Term of office		Length of term	Party	Prime Minister
	George Bridges, Baron Bridges of Headley	13 July 2016	12 June 2017	10 months and 30 days	Conservative	Theresa May
	Steve Baker; MP for Wycombe	13 June 2017	9 July 2018	1 year and 26 days	Conservative	Theresa May
	Chris Heaton-Harris; MP for Daventry	9 July 2018	3 April 2019	8 months and 25 days	Conservative	Theresa May
	James Cleverly; MP for Braintree	4 April 2019	24 July 2019	3 months and 20 days	Conservative	Theresa May
	Suella Braverman; MP for Fareham	9 January 2018	15 November 2018	4 months and 6 days	Conservative	Theresa May
	Kwasi Kwarteng; MP for Spelthorne	16 November 2018	24 July 2019	8 months and 8 days	Conservative	Theresa May
	Robin Walker; MP for Worcester	17 July 2016	26 July 2019	3 years and 9 days	Conservative	Theresa May
	James Duddridge; MP for Rochford and Southend East	27 July 2019	31 January 2020	6 months and 4 days	Conservative	Boris Johnson

== See also ==
- Minister of State for Europe
- Shadow Secretary of State for Exiting the European Union
- Cabinet Secretary for Government Business and Constitutional Relations
