= Minister of State for Exiting the European Union =

Defunct ministerial office in the British government

The Minister of State for Exiting the European Union was a position in the Department for Exiting the European Union in the Government of the United Kingdom. The minister deputised for the Secretary of State for Exiting the European Union.

== History ==
David Jones was removed as minister after the 2017 general election.

== List of ministers ==
Colour key (for political parties):

Conservative

| Portrait | Name | Term of office | | Length of term | Party | Prime Minister |
|---|---|---|---|---|---|---|
| | David Jones; MP for Clwyd West | 17 July 2016 | 12 June 2017 | 10 months and 26 days | Conservative | Theresa May |
| | Joyce Anelay, Baroness Anelay of St Johns | 12 June 2017 | 27 October 2017 | 4 months and 15 days | Conservative | Theresa May |
| | Martin Callanan, Baron Callanan | 27 October 2017 | 31 January 2020 | 2 years, 3 months and 4 days | Conservative | Theresa May |
| | Martin Callanan, Baron Callanan | 27 October 2017 | 31 January 2020 | 2 years, 3 months and 4 days | Conservative | Boris Johnson |
