= Minister of State for Trade =

UK government position

United Kingdom Minister of State for Trade
- Royal Arms of His Majesty's Government

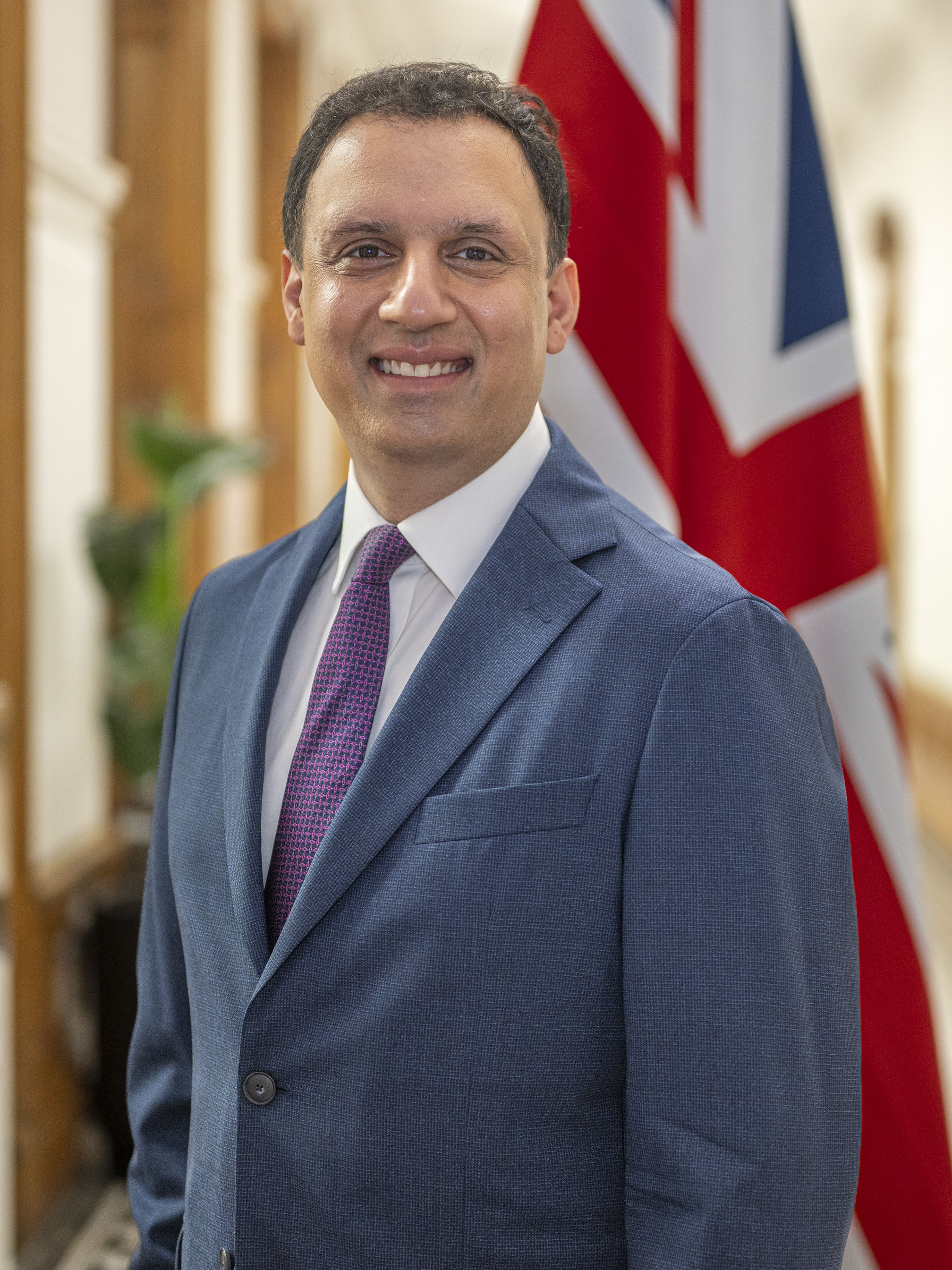
- Incumbent; Anas Sarwar, Baron Sarwar since 22 July 2026
- Department for Business, Innovation, Science and Trade
- Style: Minister
- Nominator: Prime Minister of the United Kingdom
- Appointer: The Monarch; on advice of the Prime Minister
- Formation: 3 September 1953
- First holder: Derick Heathcoat-Amory
- Website: www.gov.uk/government/ministers/minister-of-state--239

The Minister of State for Trade is a mid-level role at the Department for Business, Innovation, Science and Trade in the Government of the United Kingdom. It is currently held by Anas Sarwar, who was appointed on 22 July 2026.

== History ==
Although a Minister of State position, it was considered to be one of the most important jobs outside Cabinet rank as when Douglas Alexander became Minister of State for Trade in September 2004, he was given a special provision to attend the Cabinet meetings.

This position replaced the office of Secretary for Overseas Trade, created in 1917.

The subsequent role of Minister of State for Investment was created in 2021.

The minister formerly worked at the Department for Business, Innovation and Skills, Department for Business, Energy and Industrial Strategy and Department for International Trade.

== List of ministers ==
Minister	Entered office	Left office	Political party	Prime Minister	President of the Board of Trade
=== Minister of State for Trade ===
Derick Heathcoat-Amory	3 September 1953	18 October 1954	Conservative	Winston Churchill	Peter Thorneycroft
Derek Walker-Smith	18 October 1954	6 April 1955	Conservative	Winston Churchill	Peter Thorneycroft
Derick Heathcoat-Amory	6 April 1955	16 January 1957	Conservative	Anthony Eden	Peter Thorneycroft
Derek Walker-Smith	16 January 1957	17 September 1957	Conservative	Harold Macmillan	David Eccles
John Vaughan-Morgan	17 September 1957	22 October 1959	Conservative	Harold Macmillan	David Eccles
Frederick Erroll	22 October 1959	9 October 1961	Conservative	Harold Macmillan	Reginald Maudling
Keith Joseph	9 October 1961	16 July 1962	Conservative	Harold Macmillan	Frederick Erroll
Alan Green	16 July 1962	23 October 1963	Conservative	Harold Macmillan	Frederick Erroll
Patrick Vanden-Bempde-Johnstone, 4th Baron Derwent	6 September 1962	23 October 1963	Conservative	Harold Macmillan	Frederick Erroll
Niall Macpherson, 1st Baron Drumalbyn	23 October 1963	16 October 1964	Conservative	Alec Douglas-Home	Edward Heath
Edward du Cann	23 October 1963	16 October 1964	Conservative	Alec Douglas-Home	Edward Heath
George Darling	20 October 1964	6 April 1968	Labour Co-op	Harold Wilson	Douglas Jay
Edward Redhead	20 October 1964	11 October 1965	Labour	Harold Wilson	Douglas Jay
Roy Mason	20 October 1964	7 January 1967	Labour	Harold Wilson	Douglas Jay
Wilfred Brown, Baron Brown	11 October 1965	19 June 1970	Labour	Harold Wilson	Douglas Jay
Joseph Mallalieu	7 January 1967	1 July 1968	Labour	Harold Wilson	Anthony Crosland
Edmund Dell	6 April 1968	13 October 1969	Labour	Harold Wilson	Anthony Crosland
William Rodgers	1 July 1968	13 October 1969	Labour	Harold Wilson	Anthony Crosland
Goronwy Roberts	13 October 1969	19 June 1970	Labour	Harold Wilson	Roy Mason
Frederick Corfield	24 June 1970	15 October 1970	Conservative	Edward Heath	Michael Noble
Michael Noble	15 October 1970	5 November 1972	Conservative	Edward Heath	John Davies
Geoffrey Howe (Note: Attended Cabinet.)	5 November 1972	4 March 1974	Conservative	Edward Heath	Peter Walker
=== Parliamentary Under-Secretary of State for Trade ===
Eric Deakins	4 March 1974	5 April 1976	Labour	Harold Wilson	Peter Shore
Stanley Clinton-Davis	4 March 1974	4 May 1979	Labour	Harold Wilson	Peter Shore; Edmund Dell; John Smith
Michael Meacher	5 April 1976	4 May 1979	Labour	James Callaghan	Edmund Dell; John Smith
=== Minister of State for Trade ===
Cecil Parkinson	7 May 1979	14 September 1981	Conservative	Margaret Thatcher	John Nott; John Biffen
Peter Rees	14 September 1981	9 June 1983	Conservative	Margaret Thatcher	John Biffen; Lord Cockfield
Paul Channon	9 June 1983	24 January 1986	Conservative	Margaret Thatcher	Cecil Parkinson; Norman Tebbit; Leon Brittan
Alan Clark	24 January 1986	25 July 1989	Conservative	Margaret Thatcher	Paul Channon; Lord Young of Graffham
David Trefgarne, 2nd Baron Trefgarne	25 July 1989	23 July 1990	Conservative	Margaret Thatcher	Nicholas Ridley
Tim Sainsbury	23 July 1990	14 April 1992	Conservative	John Major	Peter Lilley
Richard Needham	14 April 1992	6 July 1995	Conservative	John Major	Michael Heseltine
Anthony Nelson	6 July 1995	2 May 1997	Conservative	John Major	Ian Lang
Stanley Clinton Davis, Baron Clinton-Davis	2 May 1997	28 July 1998	Labour	Tony Blair	Margaret Beckett
Brian Wilson	28 July 1998	28 July 1999	Labour	Tony Blair	Peter Mandelson; Stephen Byers
Richard Caborn	28 July 1999	11 June 2001	Labour	Tony Blair	Stephen Byers
Elizabeth Symons, Baroness Symons of Vernham Dean	11 June 2001	13 June 2003	Labour	Tony Blair	Patricia Hewitt
Mike O'Brien	13 June 2003	9 September 2004	Labour	Tony Blair	Patricia Hewitt
Douglas Alexander	9 September 2004	11 May 2005	Labour Co-op	Tony Blair	Patricia Hewitt
Ian Pearson	11 May 2005	8 May 2006	Labour	Tony Blair	Alan Johnson
Ian McCartney (Note: Attended Cabinet.)	8 May 2006	28 June 2007	Labour	Tony Blair	Alistair Darling
Digby Jones, Baron Jones of Birmingham	29 June 2007	3 October 2008	Independent (Note: Jones sat on the Labour benches in the House of Lords, but never joined the party.)	Gordon Brown	John Hutton
Gareth Thomas (Note: Thomas apparently continued as a Trade Minister after the appointment of Davies. BERR described him simply as Minister for Trade, rather than Minister for Trade and Investment, as he was prior to Davies' appointment.)	3 October 2008	5 June 2009	Labour Co-op	Gordon Brown	Lord Mandelson
=== Minister of State for Trade, Investment and Business ===
Mervyn Davies, Baron Davies of Abersoch	14 January 2009	11 May 2010	Labour	Gordon Brown	Lord Mandelson
=== Minister of State for Business and Enterprise ===
Mark Prisk (Note: He handled UK Trade & Investment until Green entered the government.)	11 May 2010	11 January 2011	Conservative	David Cameron	Vince Cable
=== Minister of State for Trade and Investment ===
Stephen Green, Baron Green of Hurstpierpoint	11 January 2011	11 December 2013	Conservative	David Cameron	Vince Cable
Ian Livingston, Baron Livingston of Parkhead	11 December 2013	11 May 2015	Conservative	David Cameron	Vince Cable
Francis Maude, Baron Maude of Horsham	11 May 2015	10 February 2016	Conservative	David Cameron	Sajid Javid
Joyce Anelay, Baroness Anelay of St John's	11 March 2016	4 April 2016	Conservative	David Cameron	Sajid Javid
Mark Price, Baron Price (Note: Joyce Anelay, Baroness Anelay of St John's was given Maude's responsibilities on an interim basis until Price took up the role in March 2016.)	4 April 2016	3 September 2017	Conservative	Theresa May	Sajid Javid; Greg Clark; Liam Fox
=== Minister of State for Trade and Export Promotion ===
Rona Fairhead, Baroness Fairhead	28 September 2017	7 May 2019	Conservative	Theresa May	Liam Fox
=== Minister of State for Trade Policy ===
Greg Hands	15 July 2016	21 June 2018	Conservative	Theresa May	Liam Fox
George Hollingbery	21 June 2018	25 July 2019	Conservative	Theresa May	Liam Fox
Conor Burns	25 July 2019	4 May 2020	Conservative	Boris Johnson	Liz Truss
Greg Hands	13 February 2020	15 September 2021	Conservative	Boris Johnson	Liz Truss
Penny Mordaunt	16 September 2021	6 September 2022	Conservative	Boris Johnson	Anne-Marie Trevelyan
Conor Burns	7 September 2022	7 October 2022	Conservative	Liz Truss	Kemi Badenoch
Greg Hands	9 October 2022	7 February 2023	Conservative	Liz Truss	Kemi Badenoch
Greg Hands	9 October 2022	7 February 2023	Conservative	Rishi Sunak	Kemi Badenoch
Vacant	7 February 2023	13 November 2023		Rishi Sunak	Kemi Badenoch
Greg Hands	13 November 2023	5 July 2024	Conservative	Rishi Sunak	Kemi Badenoch
=== Minister of State for Trade Policy and Economic Security ===
Douglas Alexander	6 July 2024	6 September 2025	Labour Co-op	Keir Starmer	Jonathan Reynolds
=== Minister of State for Trade ===
Sir Chris Bryant	6 September 2025	20 July 2026	Labour	Keir Starmer	Peter Kyle
Anas Sarwar, Baron Sarwar	22 July 2026	Incumbent	Labour Co-op	Andy Burnham	Jonathan Reynolds
