= Pat Thompson =

British academic

- Born: Arthur Frederick Thompson; 6 June 1920; Preston, Lancashire, England
- Died: 9 October 2009 (aged 89)
- Spouse: Mary Barritt (m. 1942)
- Children: 3, including Ruth

Academic background
- Education: Campbell College; Dulwich College; Magdalen College, Oxford

Academic work
- Discipline: History
- Sub-discipline: Political history; Social history; Trade unions in the United Kingdom; William Ewart Gladstone
- Institutions: Wadham College, Oxford
- Doctoral students: Colin Matthew; Ross McKibbin

Arthur Frederick Thompson (6 June 1920 – 9 October 2009), known as Pat Thompson, and A. F. Thompson, was an academic historian specialising in 19th-century British politics and the trade union movement.

== Early life and war service ==
Thompson was born on 9 June 1920 at Preston, Lancashire, the son of a Derry-born civil servant. Three years later, the family followed his father's work to Northern Ireland (he was a senior finance officer in the government) and then in 1936 to London. After schooling at Campbell College and Dulwich College, Thompson was admitted to Magdalen College, Oxford, as an exhibitioner to study history and was taught by K. B. McFarlane and A. J. P. Taylor. After graduating with a first-class degree in 1941, he trained as a paratrooper and served in World War II. Wounded in Normandy in 1944, he was moved over to GCHQ at Bletchley Park and then, with the war over, returned to Oxford.

== Career ==
Although he passed the civil service examination with a very high score, Thompson accepted an offer to become a tutor at Wadham College, Oxford, in 1947, and remained there for the rest of his career, serving as domestic bursar, senior tutor and sub-warden. His academic studies began with 19th-century politics, and he intended to mix Sir Lewis Namier's style of analysis with careful studies of voting behaviour and apply these approaches to the premiership of William Gladstone. His attention gradually turned towards the progressive and radical political movements of the latter part of that century and from there to the origins of the labour movement, focusing especially on the role of trade unions and industrial relations – a school of thought pioneered by him and his colleagues at Oxford, Hugh Clegg and Alan Fox. A life-long attachment to Gladstone persisted and he sat on the committee overseeing the publication of the statesman's diaries, most of the editing of which was carried out by Thompson's former research student, Colin Matthew.

Although Thompson authored some notable works, in particular the first volume of A History of British Trade Unions since 1889 (1964), which he co-authored with Clegg and Fox, and "Gladstone's Whips at the General Election of 1868" (1948), he wrote relatively little. But, he was a deemed a 'major force' in history teaching at Oxford during his four decades at Wadham: he was, in the words of The Independent, "alternately acerbic and avuncular, iconoclastic and inspiring, and always generous with his time". His unique style of teaching produced a number of outstanding academics, notably Colin Matthew and Ross McKibbin; his pupils included Melvyn Bragg and Julian Mitchell. His retirement in 1987 was marked by the publication of a Festschrift, Politics and Social Change in Modern Britain, edited by Philip Waller.

== Personal life ==
Thompson married Mary Barritt, a Botany student at Somerville College, in 1942; they had three children: a daughter, Ruth, and two sons: Alan (1943–1989) and Johnny (b. 1947). Thompson, known as 'Pat' since his days at Dulwich, died on 9 October 2009.

== Archives ==
Thompson's research papers (including a large amount of correspondence between Joseph Chamberlain and John Morley) are held at the Cadbury Research Library, University of Birmingham.
