= Better Regulation Executive =

The Better Regulation Executive is a part of the British Department for Business and Trade.

It is in charge of regulatory reform across the British Government. A forerunner of the Executive was the Better Regulation Commission.

The Better Regulation Executive (BRE) was created in 2005 to lead the regulatory reform agenda across the UK Government by working to reduce and remove unnecessary regulation for the public, private and voluntary sectors.

In July 2007 the BRE moved from the Cabinet Office to become part of the Department for Business, Enterprise and Regulatory Reform (BERR), and then its successor, the Department for Business, Innovation and Skills (BIS), and then its successor, the Department of Business Energy and Industrial Strategy (BEIS). It became part of the Department of Business and Trade (DBT) in 2023.

== Policy ==
The Better Regulation Executive's purpose is to balance the priorities of protecting people's rights, health and safety and freeing them from unnecessary bureaucracy, working to reduce the costs of compliance for businesses, as well as charities and community groups, and to minimize the impact of regulations on economic growth.

Actions taken:

- controlling the number of new regulations by operating a ‘one in, three out’ rule for business regulation
- assessing the impact of each regulation
- reviewing the effectiveness of government regulations
- reducing regulation for small businesses
- improving enforcement of government regulations
- using alternatives to regulation
- reducing the cost of EU regulation on UK business
