= Martin Callanan, Baron Callanan =

British Conservative politician (born 1961)

The Right Honourable The Lord Callanan
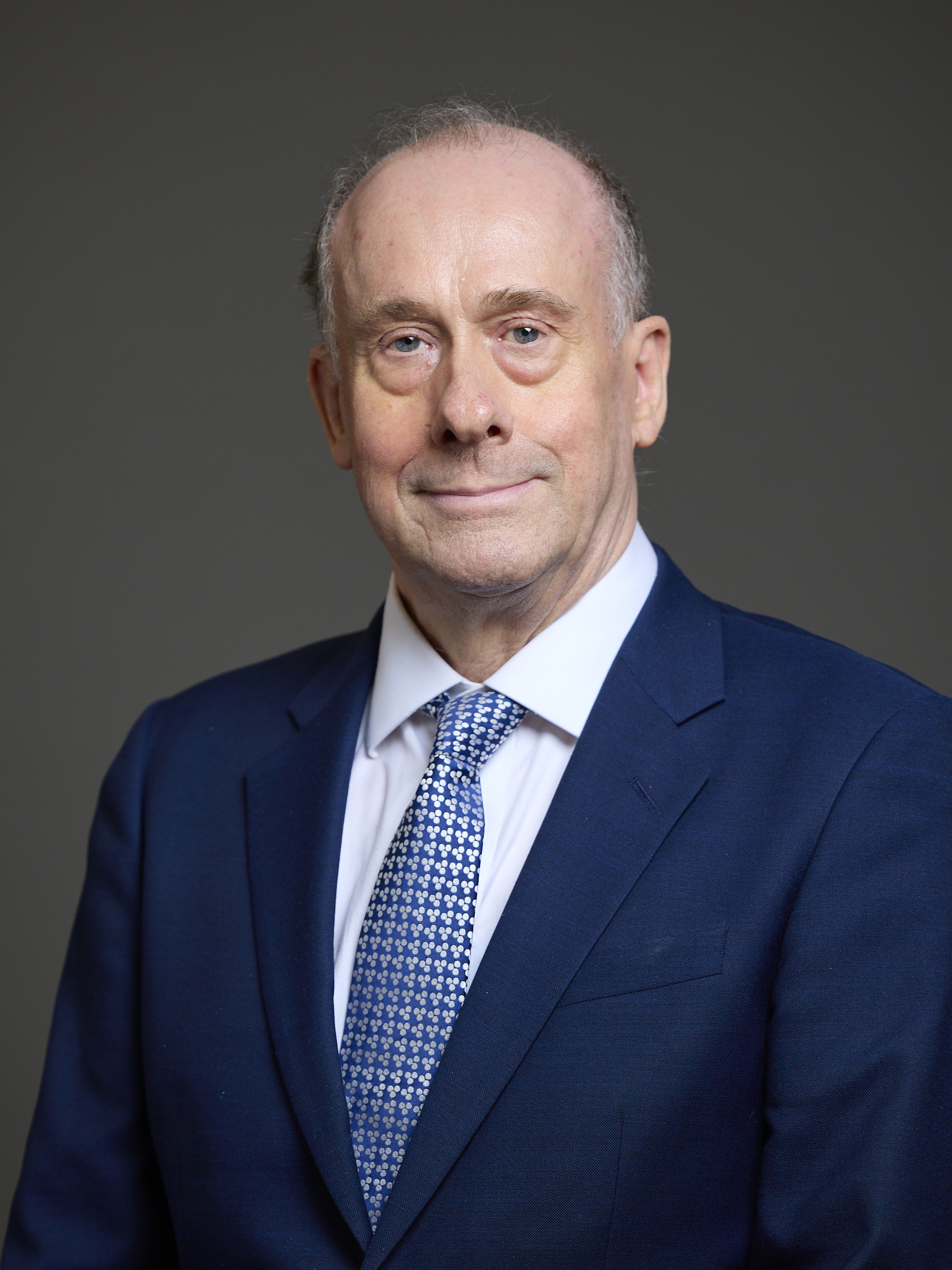
- Official portrait, 2026

Shadow Minister for Foreign Affairs
- Incumbent
- Assumed office 1 September 2024
- Leader: Rishi Sunak; Kemi Badenoch

Parliamentary Under-Secretary of State for Energy Efficiency and Green Finance
- In office 7 February 2023 – 5 July 2024
- Prime Minister: Rishi Sunak
- Preceded by: Office established
- Succeeded by: Office abolished

Parliamentary Under-Secretary of State for Business, Energy and Corporate Responsibility
- In office 14 February 2020 – 7 February 2023
- Prime Minister: Boris Johnson; Liz Truss; Rishi Sunak
- Preceded by: The Lord Duncan of Springbank (Note: As Parliamentary Under-Secretary of State for Climate Change.)
- Succeeded by: Office abolished

Minister of State for Exiting the European Union
- In office 27 October 2017 – 31 January 2020
- Prime Minister: Theresa May; Boris Johnson
- Preceded by: The Baroness Anelay of St Johns
- Succeeded by: Office abolished

Parliamentary Under-Secretary of State for Transport
- In office 14 June 2017 – 27 October 2017
- Prime Minister: Theresa May
- Preceded by: The Lord Ahmad of Wimbledon
- Succeeded by: The Baroness Sugg

Chairman of the European Conservatives and Reformists
- In office 11 December 2011 – 12 June 2014
- Preceded by: Jan Zahradil
- Succeeded by: Syed Kamall

Leader of the Conservatives in the European Parliament
- In office 23 November 2010 – 1 March 2012
- Preceded by: Timothy Kirkhope
- Succeeded by: Richard Ashworth

Member of the House of Lords
- Lord Temporal
- Life peerage 24 September 2014

Member of the European Parliament for North East England
- In office 10 June 1999 – 2 July 2014
- Preceded by: Constituency established
- Succeeded by: Jonathan Arnott

Personal details
- Born: 8 August 1961 (age 65) Gateshead, County Durham, England
- Party: Conservative
- Education: Newcastle Polytechnic

Martin John Callanan, Baron Callanan (born 8 August 1961) is a British Conservative Party politician. He was Member of the European Parliament (MEP) for North East England from 1999 to 2014 and Chairman of the European Conservatives and Reformists group from 2011 to 2014. Callanan failed his bid to win re-election in the 2014 European Parliament elections, becoming the first sitting chairman of a European parliamentary group to lose his seat. On 8 August 2014, it was announced that he would be made a Conservative life peer in the House of Lords.

Following the 2017 general election, Callanan was appointed Parliamentary Under-Secretary of State for Transport. In October the same year, he was appointed Minister of State for Exiting the European Union.

== Early life ==
Callanan was born on 8 August 1961 in Gateshead. In 1985, he graduated with a Bachelor of Science degree (BSc) in Electrical and Electronic Engineering from Newcastle Polytechnic. He worked as an engineer at Scottish and Newcastle breweries from 1986 to 1998.

== Political career ==
=== Local councillor ===
Callanan was a Conservative councillor on Tyne and Wear County Council between 1983 and 1986 (when the council was abolished) and Gateshead Metropolitan Borough Council between 1987 and 1996, for the Low Fell ward. He worked as a project engineer at Scottish and Newcastle breweries from 1986 to 1998, when he was elected to the European Parliament.

He unsuccessfully stood as a parliamentary candidate for Houghton and Washington (in the 1987 election), Gateshead East (in the 1992 election), and Tynemouth (in the 1997 election).

=== Member of European Parliament ===
He was a Member of the European Parliament for the North East England constituency from 1999, re-elected in 2004 and 2009. In December 2011, he became the leader of the European Conservatives and Reformists group in the Parliament; as a leader of a parliamentary group, he had a seat in the political leadership of the European Parliament, the Conference of Presidents.

He was a member of the ACP–EU Joint Parliamentary Assembly, and of the European Parliament's committee on the environment, public health and food safety (ENVI). Callanan was a regular contributor to ConservativeHome, writing a monthly report.

Callanan failed to win re-election in the 2014 European Parliament election, becoming the first sitting chairman of a European parliamentary group to lose his seat.

=== Peer and government minister ===
Callanan was created a life peer on 24 September 2014, taking the title Baron Callanan, of Low Fell in the County of Tyne and Wear.

Following the 2017 general election, Callanan was appointed Parliamentary Under-Secretary of State for Transport. In the role he introduced the Space Industry Bill.

In October the same year he was appointed Minister of State for Exiting the European Union. The following month he was obliged to apologise for incorrectly stating in the Lords that the Supreme Court had ruled Article 50 of the Treaty on European Union was irreversible.

Callanan was appointed Parliamentary Under Secretary of State at the newly created Department for Energy Security and Net Zero, on 7 February 2023, following a Cabinet reshuffle.

He piloted many significant Bills through the Lords, including the Retained EU Law (Revocation and Reform) Act 2023, the Strikes (Minimum Service Levels) Act 2023 and the landmark Energy Bill, which is still in Parliament.

In June 2025, Lord Callanan, Shadow Foreign Secretary in the House of Lords, tabled a motion opposing the ratification of the treaty to return the Chagos Archipelago to Mauritius, an archipelago located in the British Indian Ocean Territory.

== Notes ==
European Parliament
Constituency established	Member of the European Parliament for North East England; 1999–2014	Succeeded by Jonathan Arnott
Preceded by Timothy Kirkhope	Leader of the Conservatives in the European Parliament; 2010–2012	Succeeded by Richard Ashworth
Preceded by Jan Zahradil	Chairman of the European Conservatives and Reformists; 2011–2014	Succeeded by Syed Kamall
Political offices
Preceded by The Lord Ahmad of Wimbledon	Parliamentary Under-Secretary of State for Transport; 2017	Succeeded by The Baroness Sugg as Parliamentary Under-Secretary of State for Aviation
Preceded by The Baroness Anelay of St Johns	Minister of State for Exiting the European Union; 2017–2020	Department abolished
Preceded by The Lord Duncan of Springbank as Parliamentary Under-Secretary of State for Climate Change	Parliamentary Under-Secretary of State for Climate Change; 2020–present	Incumbent
Orders of precedence in the United Kingdom
Preceded by The Lord Cashman	Gentlemen; Baron Callanan	Followed by The Lord Green of Deddington
