= Olly Robbins =

British civil servant (born 1975)

Sir Olly Robbins KCMG CB
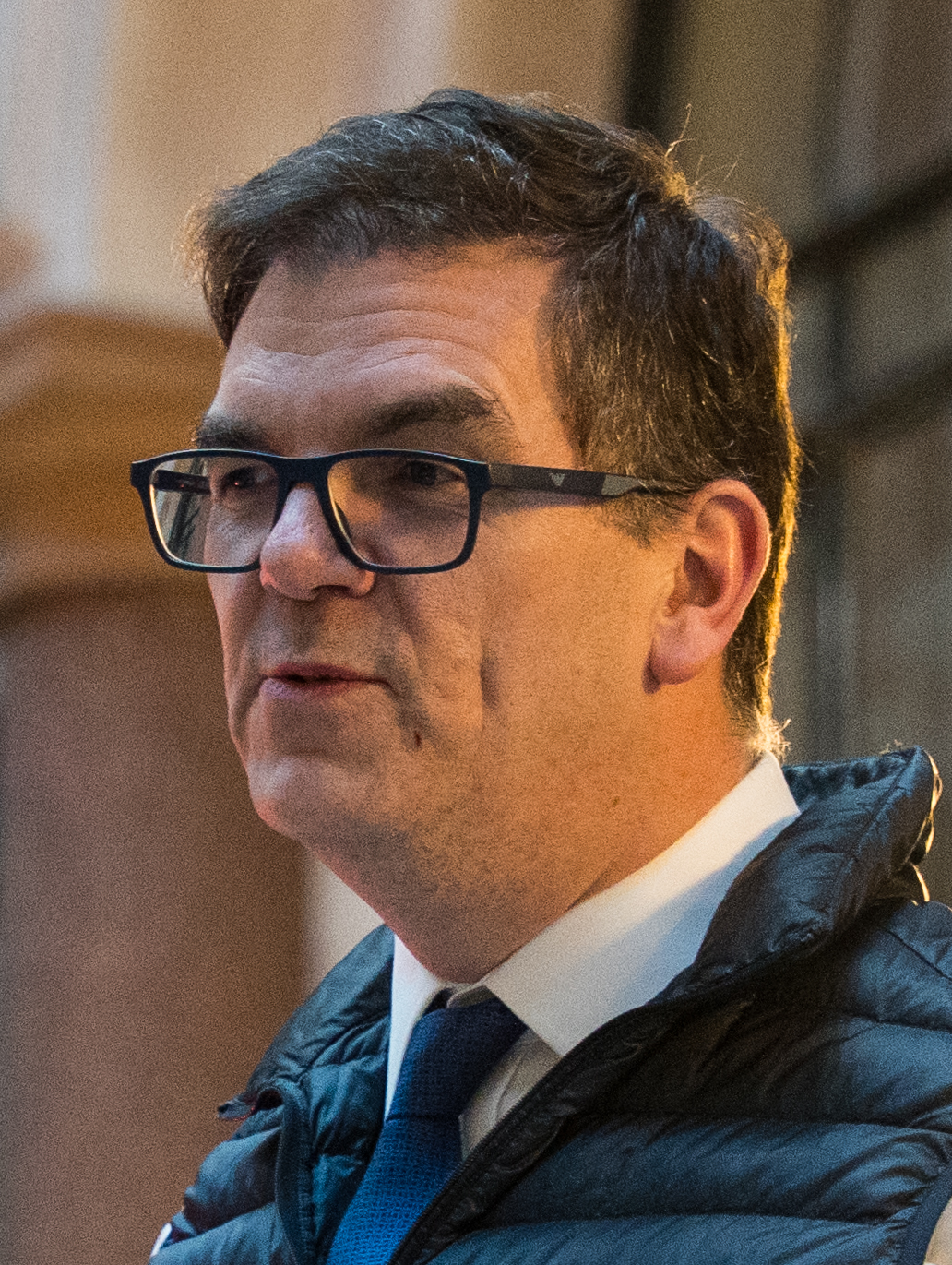
- Robbins in 2025

Permanent Under-Secretary for Foreign, Commonwealth & Development Affairs Head of HM Diplomatic Service
- In office 8 January 2025 – 16 April 2026
- Prime Minister: Keir Starmer
- Foreign Secretary: David Lammy; Yvette Cooper
- Preceded by: Philip Barton
- Succeeded by: Nick Dyer (interim)

Chief Negotiator for Exiting the European Union
- In office 18 September 2017 – 24 July 2019
- Prime Minister: Theresa May
- Preceded by: David Davis
- Succeeded by: Lord Frost

Prime Minister's Europe Adviser
- In office 18 September 2017 – 24 July 2019
- Prime Minister: Theresa May
- Preceded by: Oliver Letwin (2016)
- Succeeded by: David Frost
- In office 24 June 2016 – 11 July 2016 Serving with Oliver Letwin
- Prime Minister: David Cameron
- Preceded by: Tom Scholar
- Succeeded by: Oliver Letwin

Permanent Secretary for the Department for Exiting the European Union
- In office July 2016 – 18 September 2017
- Prime Minister: Theresa May
- Brexit Secretary: David Davis
- Preceded by: Office established
- Succeeded by: Philip Rycroft

Second Permanent Secretary for the Home Office
- In office September 2015 – June 2016
- Prime Minister: David Cameron
- Home Secretary: Theresa May
- Succeeded by: Patsy Wilkinson

Director-General of the Civil Service
- In office January 2014 – September 2015
- Prime Minister: David Cameron
- Preceded by: Katherine Kerswell
- Succeeded by: Simon Claydon

Principal Private Secretary to the Prime Minister of the United Kingdom
- In office 27 June 2006 – 11 September 2007
- Prime Minister: Tony Blair; Gordon Brown
- Preceded by: Ivan Rogers
- Succeeded by: Tom Scholar

Personal details
- Born: 20 April 1975 (age 51) Lambeth, London, England
- Spouse: Sherry Birkbeck (m. 2005)
- Children: 3
- Education: Colfe's School
- Alma mater: Hertford College, Oxford
- Occupation: Civil servant
- Awards: KCMG; CB

Sir Oliver Robbins KCMG CB (born 20 April 1975) is a British former senior civil servant who served as the Prime Minister's Europe Adviser, the chief Brexit negotiator from 2017 to 2019, and Permanent Under-Secretary at the Foreign Office from 2025 to 2026.

Prior to his roles relating to the European Union in HM Civil Service, Robbins served as Principal Private Secretary to the Prime Minister and Second Permanent Secretary at the Home Office. He also served as the Permanent Secretary at the Department for Exiting the European Union from July 2016 to September 2017, and as the Prime Minister's Advisor on Europe and Global Issues from June to July 2016. Between 2019 and 2025, he was an investment advisor with Goldman Sachs. He became a controversial figure among Brexit supporters for his perceived pro-European stance.

He was appointed Permanent Under-Secretary, the most senior civil servant at the Foreign Office, in January 2025, but was dismissed in April 2026 over the controversy around Peter Mandelson's appointment as British ambassador to the United States.

== Early life and education ==
Robbins was born in 1975 in Lambeth, to Derek Robbins and Diana (née Phillips). His father is Emeritus Professor of International Social Theory at the University of East London, where he has taught since it was founded as North East London Polytechnic in 1970, devoting his career to French post-structuralist social theory and the work of Pierre Bourdieu. His mother was a civil servant, who left her job to raise her children.

He was educated at Colfe's School, a private school in Lee, south-east London, and Hertford College, Oxford, where in 1996 he took a BA in PPE. At Oxford, he was elected President of the Oxford Reform Club, a group promoting a federal European Union.

== Career ==
=== Early career ===
Robbins joined HM Treasury in 1996 after graduation, serving as head of corporate and private finance from 2003 to 2006, and then briefly as head of defence, diplomacy and intelligence finance.

He was appointed as Principal Private Secretary to the Prime Minister at 10 Downing Street in 2006, replacing Ivan Rogers for the last part of Tony Blair's administration and the start of Gordon Brown's. When Brown re-set the Prime Minister's Office organisation to be more like its pre-1997 form, Robbins briefly served as its director before leaving Number 10 in 2007 to become the director of intelligence and security — later, director of intelligence, security and resilience — in the Cabinet Office.

In 2010, David Cameron's incoming administration reorganised the UK national security apparatus, and Robbins's post was reformulated as the deputy national security advisor responsible for intelligence, security and resilience. In this role, Robbins negotiated with The Guardian on how to curtail its reporting of material leaked by Edward Snowden relating to the operations of the CIA and GCHQ. The Guardian described Robbins as "steely but punctiliously polite".

In January 2014, Robbins was appointed director-general (civil service) at the Cabinet Office. In September 2015, Robbins moved to the Home Office as Second Permanent Secretary alongside Sir Mark Sedwill. He had responsibility for immigration and free movement, as well as the borders, immigration and citizenship system. During this role, Robbins was ordered to leave a meeting of the Home Affairs Select Committee after he was deemed to have given "unsatisfactory" answers about the budget for Border Force and to instead provide answers outside the hearing later the same day, which he did not do.

=== European Union adviser ===
In July 2016, Robbins was appointed the head of the European and Global Issues Secretariat, advising the Prime Minister on the European Union and to oversee Britain's exit from the EU. Shortly thereafter, the secretariat was moved out of the Cabinet Office becoming a Ministry of State, the Department for Exiting the European Union, of which he became permanent secretary. In September 2017, Robbins moved from the Brexit Department to become Prime Minister Theresa May's personal Brexit advisor. His closeness to May led to him being described as her consigliere, though he was praised by allies of the four Prime Ministers he served.

Robbins's role in negotiating a deal for the UK withdrawal from the European Union led to some Conservative MPs blaming him for an anti-Brexit "establishment plot", criticising him as "secretive" and likening him to Grigori Rasputin. Acting Cabinet Secretary Sir Mark Sedwill sent a letter to The Times defending Robbins, asserting that civil servants implement the decisions of elected governments. Sedwill pointed to the example of HMRC permanent secretary Sir Jon Thompson receiving death threats after giving evidence before MPs about the costs of a potential post-Brexit customs plan. Responding to Sedwill's letter, Andrew Adonis said that civil servants should "start getting used to criticism", as they had the option to work on other policies. A group of former military and intelligence officials associated with pro-Brexit pressure group Veterans for Britain, including Sir Richard Dearlove, the former head of MI6, said Robbins had "serious questions of improper conduct to answer" over defence and security co-operation between the UK and the EU after Brexit. Former Department for Work and Pensions permanent secretary Sir Leigh Lewis backed up Sedwill's letter, noting the "occupational hazard for senior civil servants to be held responsible for the political decisions of ministers", of which he considered the attacks on Robbins to be a blatant example in a particularly toxic environment.

=== Later career ===
In June 2019 it was reported that Robbins intended to resign when Theresa May left office. He was elected to the Heywood fellowship at the Blavatnik School of Government in September 2019, after which he joined Goldman Sachs as a managing director of the bank's investment banking division; joining former European Commission president José Manuel Barroso, who was the non-executive chairman of Goldman Sachs International at the time.

Robbins worked for strategic advisory firm Hakluyt & Company in about 2024.

He applied to be cabinet secretary, but Sir Chris Wormald was appointed instead in December 2024. Robbins was one of the final four appointable candidates shortlisted by an expert panel with Sir Chris Wormald, Dame Antonia Romeo and Tamara Finkelstein.

=== Permanent Under-Secretary, FCDO ===
Robbins was appointed Permanent Under-Secretary of State for Foreign Affairs on 8 January 2025 for a five-year term, succeeding Sir Philip Barton.

Under Robbins, the FCDO underwent staff cuts. All directors general and director-level staff were required to reapply for their jobs with reductions to staff expected in 2026. On 16 April 2026, Robbins was dismissed over the controversy surrounding Peter Mandelson's appointment as British ambassador to the United States. Robbins gave evidence on this issue to the Foreign Affairs Committee on 21 April 2026. In July 2026, Robbins initiated legal proceedings over his dismissal, seeking a judicial review.

== Personal life ==
Robbins has been married to Sherry Birkbeck since 2005. They have three children. He is a member of the National Liberal Club.

== Honours ==
In the 2015 Queen's Birthday Honours, Robbins was appointed a Companion of the Order of the Bath (CB) for public service. He was advanced as a Knight Commander of the Order of St Michael and St George in the 2019 Prime Minister's Resignation Honours.

Government offices
Preceded by Ivan Rogers	Principal Private Secretary to the Prime Minister; 2006–2007	Succeeded by Tom Scholar
Preceded by Robert Hannigan	Director of Intelligence Security and Resilience for the Cabinet Office; 2007–2010	Office abolished
New post	Deputy National Security Advisor for the Cabinet Office; 2010–2014	Succeeded by Paddy McGuinness
Preceded by Katherine Kerswell	Director-General of the Civil Service; 2014–2015	Succeeded by Simon Claydon
New post	Deputy Permanent Secretary for the Home Office; 2015–2016	Succeeded by Patsy Wilkinson
Preceded by Tom Scholar as Prime Minister's Adviser for Europe and Global Issues	Permanent Secretary for the Department for Exiting the European Union; 2016–2017	Succeeded by Philip Rycroft
Preceded by Philip Barton	Permanent Under-Secretary of Foreign, Commonwealth & Development Affairs; 8 January 2025–present	Succeeded by incumbent
