= Ernest Bramsted =

British historian

Ernest Kohn Bramsted FAHA (born Ernst Kohn-Bramstedt, 1901; died 14 May 1978) was a German-born historian and sociologist of literature who spent large parts of his career in Germany, England and Australia.

== Early life ==
Ernst Kohn-Bramstadt was born in Augsburg in 1901 to a textile manufacturer who died seven years later. The family was Jewish and liberal. In 1917, he began following left-liberal newspapers which argued for greater democratisation in Germany, and reading Max Weber's sociological writings. The following year, he anonymously contributed to the socialist newspaper, Schwabische Volkszeitung.

== Career ==
When the war came to an end, antisemitism persuaded Kohn-Bramstadt to steer clear of politics and in 1921 he began a course in German language, literature, philosophy and history at the Ludwig-Maximilians-Universität München; transferring the following year to the University of Freiburg, and then in 1923 to the Friedrich Wilhelm University of Berlin, he started studying history at the latter under Friedrich Meinecke. He was awarded a doctorate in 1926 and taught at schools in Leipzig and Frankfurt. Four years later, he was appointed part-time lecturer at Frankfurt and was influenced by one of its sociologists, Karl Mannheim. After being expelled from his post due to the Nazi government's antisemitic Enabling Laws in 1933, he briefly moved to the Netherlands and then studied as a doctoral student under Mannheim (who was also expelled from Frankfurt) at the London School of Economics. He was awarded his doctorate in 1936 for an historical sociological study of the aristocracy and middle classes in Germany and, for the following three years, tutored privately in the German and history.

In 1939, Bramsted was naturalised a British citizen and during World War II monitored German radio and produced counter-propaganda for the BBC until 1943, when he joined the Political Intelligence Department of the Foreign Office. After the war, he taught in Germany and from 1948 to 1952 sat on the editorial board for the series entitled Documents on German Foreign Policy 1918–45. He then took up a post in the Department of History at the University of Sydney and retired as an associate professor in 1969. He was a Foundation Fellow (1969) of the Australian Academy of the Humanities.

He died in England on 14 May 1978, and his papers were added to the Archives and Special Collections section of the London School of Economics Library.

== Works ==
- Aristocracy and the Middle Classes in Germany: Social Types in German literature 1830–1900 (London: King, 1937).
- Dictatorship and Political Police: the Technique of Control by Fear (London: Paul, Trench, Trubner & Co., 1945).
- Goebbels and National Socialist Propaganda: 19251945 (East Lansing, MI: Michigan State University Press, 1965).
- Goebbels und die nationalsozialistische Propaganda 1925 bis 1945 (Aus d. Engl. übers. von H. E. Strakosch) (Frankfurt a.M.: S. Fischer, 1971).
- Germany (Englewood Cliffs: Prentice-Hall, 1972).
