= Morgan McSweeney =

Irish-born political aide (born 1977)

Downing Street Chief of Staff
- In office 6 October 2024 – 8 February 2026
- Prime Minister: Keir Starmer
- Deputy: Vidhya Alakeson; Jill Cuthbertson
- Preceded by: Sue Gray
- Succeeded by: James Purnell

Head of Political Strategy 10 Downing Street
- In office 5 July 2024 – 6 October 2024 Serving with Paul Ovenden
- Prime Minister: Keir Starmer
- Preceded by: Office established
- Succeeded by: Paul Ovenden

Chief of Staff to the Leader of the Opposition
- In office 4 April 2020 – 20 June 2021
- Leader: Keir Starmer
- Preceded by: Karie Murphy
- Succeeded by: Sam White

Personal details
- Born: Morgan James McSweeney; 19 April 1977 (age 49) Macroom, County Cork, Ireland
- Party: Labour
- Spouse: Imogen Walker
- Children: 1
- Education: Middlesex University (BA)

Morgan James McSweeney (born 19 April 1977) is an Irish former political strategist for the British Labour Party. He served as Downing Street Chief of Staff under Prime Minister Keir Starmer from October 2024 until his resignation in February 2026. A close colleague and adviser to Starmer over many years, he was ranked first in a 2024 New Statesman poll on influential people in UK left-wing politics, and has been compared to Dominic Cummings and Peter Mandelson.

McSweeney joined the Labour Party in 1997, motivated by backing for the Good Friday Agreement, and in 2001 he was hired to work as an intern receptionist and then in the party's attack and rebuttal unit in Millbank. From 2008 until 2010, he campaigned with David Evans, Jon Cruddas, Margaret Hodge and Hope not Hate against the British National Party. Before working with Starmer, McSweeney ran council and leadership campaigns for Steve Reed in 2006 and Liz Kendall in 2015, and formed the Labour Together think tank in 2017. In 2020, he led Starmer's successful Labour leadership campaign and held senior roles under Starmer including Chief of Staff to the Leader of the Opposition, Labour's director of campaigns, and campaign director for the party during the 2024 general election, which the party won.

McSweeney was originally appointed Head of Political Strategy at 10 Downing Street alongside Paul Ovenden in July 2024 and was later appointed chief of staff following Sue Gray's resignation in October 2024. He resigned from the role in February 2026 amid internal pressure over his role in recommending Mandelson's appointment as UK ambassador to the United States following revelations about Mandelson's ties to the convicted sex offender Jeffrey Epstein, acknowledging it was wrong and had damaged the party and trust in politics.

During his work with Starmer in both opposition and government, McSweeney was widely credited with shaping Labour's shift towards the political centre, though he also faced accusations of political factionalism and briefing against Sue Gray and Wes Streeting. Starmer stated that he and the Labour Party owe McSweeney a "debt of gratitude" for his years of service and credited him with a central role in the party's electoral success, including the 2024 landslide majority.

== Early life and education ==
Morgan James McSweeney was born on 19 April 1977 in Macroom, County Cork, Ireland. His father, Tim McSweeney, was a senior partner in an accounting firm. His mother, Carmel McSweeney, was a retired office worker and keen bridge player. His parents supported Fine Gael. His grandfather on his father's side, Michael McSweeney, fought for the Irish Republican Army during the Irish War of Independence and received a medal for it. He supported the pro-treaty side in the Irish Civil War and later joined Fine Gael. His aunt, Evelyn McSweeney, was a Fine Gael councillor and mayor of Macroom three times. Her daughter, Clare Mungovan, has worked as an adviser to Fine Gael leaders Leo Varadkar and Simon Harris. As a child, McSweeney played hurling and was a mascot for the Macroom GAA Gaelic football team. He showed no interest in politics when young and liked sports, including being a Liverpool F.C. fan.

He moved to London in 1994 at the age of 17. He first lived with his mother's sister in Fulham and worked on building sites and in pubs, and was an idealistic member of the Campaign for Nuclear Disarmament. He started university at the London School of Economics but left after two years. He then stayed with his uncle, a priest, in California. After that, he spent several months on the Sarid kibbutz in Israel in the late 1990s. Aged 21 in 1998, he went back to university. He studied marketing and politics at Middlesex University and graduated with a degree.

== Political career ==
=== Local Labour organiser ===
In 1997, motivated by backing for the Good Friday Agreement, McSweeney joined the Labour Party, and in 2001 he was hired to work as an intern receptionist and then in the party's attack and rebuttal unit in Millbank, where he input data into Peter Mandelson's "Excalibur" database. Alan Milburn dispatched McSweeney to marginal seats to campaign for Labour in the 2005 general election.

He moved on to campaign for Steve Reed for the 2006 Lambeth London Borough Council election, working to take control of the council from the Liberal Democrats and Conservatives, gaining a reputation as a "formidable organiser," according to The Guardian. Labour succeeded in the election, gaining the council from a previous Conservative-Liberal Democrat coalition. McSweeney simultaneously ran as a council candidate in the 2006 Sutton London Borough Council election, which he lost with 149 votes. He then worked as chief of staff for Reed in Lambeth Council.

From 2008 until 2010, he campaigned with David Evans, Jon Cruddas, Margaret Hodge and Hope not Hate against the British National Party in Barking and Dagenham. He worked with the council's leadership, developing communication strategies for the 17 wards in the community including the re-establishment of a duty on residents to keep their front gardens clean, also focusing on patriotism and crime as campaign points. This campaign succeeded in the 2010 general election, when Labour defeated the BNP in the borough. Cruddas later referred to McSweeney as "the real unsung hero of the whole thing". Following Labour's national defeat in the 2010 general election, he became head of the Labour Group Office at the Local Government Association.

=== 2015 Liz Kendall Labour leadership campaign ===
In the 2015 Labour leadership election, McSweeney ran the leadership campaign of Liz Kendall, who came fourth with 4.5% of the vote. McSweeney then spent another period in local government.

In 2017, he formed Labour Together during the Labour Party leadership of Jeremy Corbyn, where he sought to replace Corbyn and to reduce left-wing influence in the party.

=== Director of Labour Together ===
McSweeney is regarded as the leading architect of the think tank Labour Together. He became director in 2017, reporting to a board that included Reed, Lisa Nandy, Jon Cruddas and Trevor Chinn, and also serving as company secretary. As Labour Together director, he declared his aims to be "to move the Labour party from the hard left" and to "build a sustainable winning electoral coalition." Under his leadership, Labour Together worked on a strategy to remove Jeremy Corbyn from the party leadership and to institute reforms to Labour Party processes to prevent the left wing of the party from subsequently regaining the leadership.

Through polling Labour membership, he determined that it would be possible to peel away the soft left, younger "idealists" of Labour from Corbyn's support base, eventually picking Keir Starmer as a suitable figure to replace Corbyn as leader. He composed a three-year plan for Starmer to become Prime Minister after taking control of the party, which involved first performing "immediate CPR" to reform the party's ranks (which included removing supporters of Corbyn and Scottish Labour leader Richard Leonard and excluding them from future leadership contests), then secondly becoming an effective opposition in parliament by directly attacking the Conservatives on their failures, and lastly winning power by outwitting the Conservatives on crime, defence and the economy. He was then recruited to run Starmer's 2020 campaign for Labour leader, which Starmer won. During this time McSweeney set up the Center for Countering Digital Hate, initially designed to target online antisemitism.

McSweeney fundraised for Labour Together during his role as company secretary, though stopped reporting the large majority of donations the group received from December 2017 onward, eventually failing to report more than £730,000 in funds within the 30 days required by law during his tenure. The undeclared donations as well as additional incorrect information declared by McSweeney were investigated by the Electoral Commission; Labour Together received a fine of £14,250 for over 20 breaches of electoral law in September 2021, which a spokesman for the Commission stated was "towards the high end of [the] scale".

In February 2026, it was reported that Labour Together paid the PR firm APCO Worldwide to spy on journalists critical of Starmer. These included reporters from The Sunday Times, The Guardian and Declassified UK. This had also previously been detailed in Paul Holden's book The Fraud. As part of Labour Together's strategy to diminish the influence of the left, he had also worked to prevent the newly founded left-wing news website The Canary from growing in popularity among Labour members, while building a close link between the mainstream centre-left newspaper The Guardian and Labour Together.

=== Chief of staff to the Leader of the Opposition ===
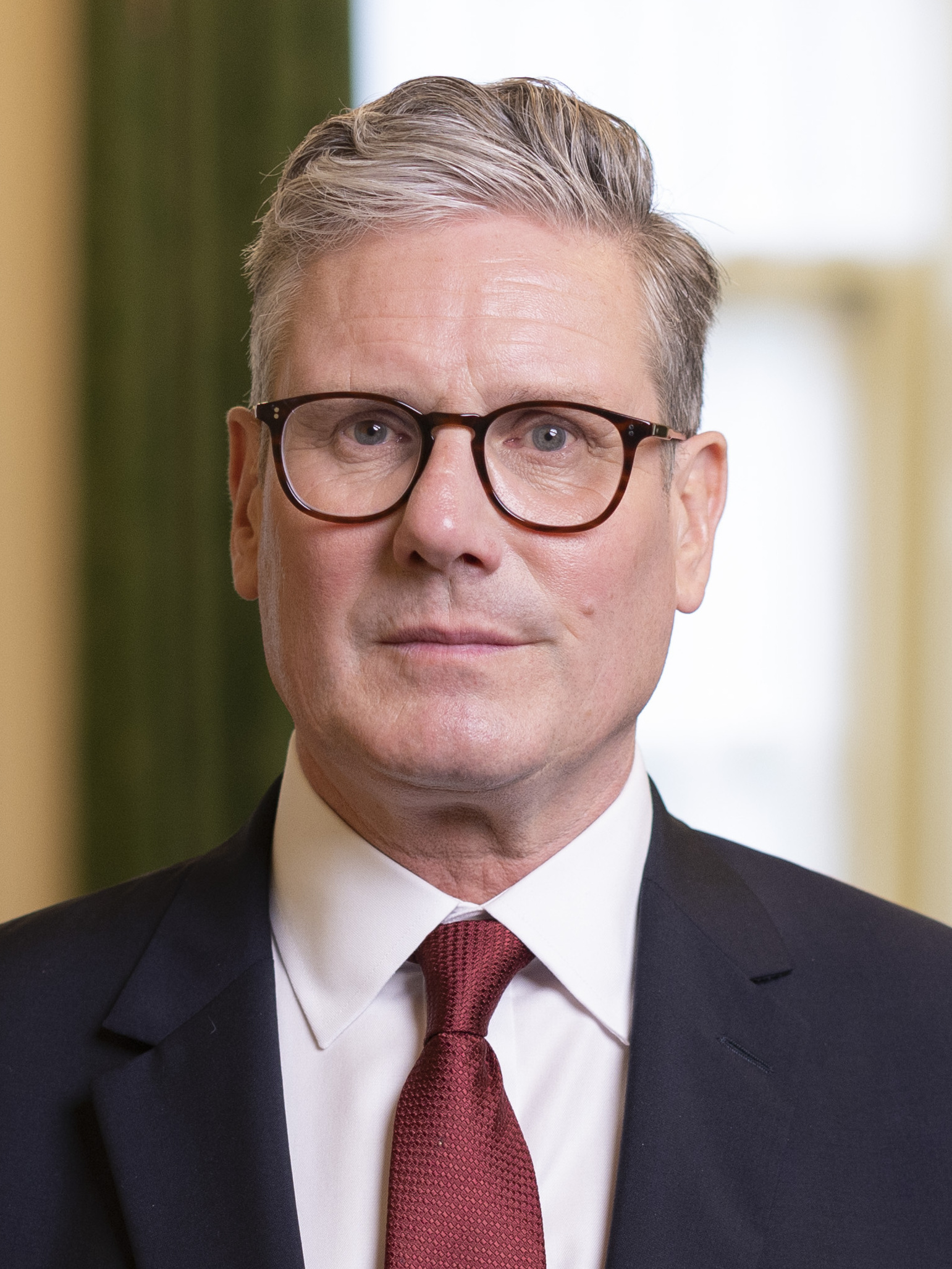
During his work with Keir Starmer in both opposition and government, McSweeney was widely credited with shaping Labour's shift towards the political centre and having a central role in the party's electoral success, including the 2024 landslide majority.

In 2020, he led the successful Labour leadership campaign of Keir Starmer. Starmer succeeded Corbyn in the leadership election on 4 April 2020 with 56.2% of the vote and chose McSweeney as his chief of staff.

On 20 June 2021, following Labour's worst ever by-election performance in the Chesham and Amersham by-election and in anticipation of the July Batley and Spen by-election, Starmer moved McSweeney from Chief of Staff to a "strategic role" in his office, though he remained as Starmer's "number one adviser".

=== Director of campaigns ===
In September 2021 McSweeney was appointed Labour's director of campaigns. He also worked to impose a new MP selection process for the Labour Party, centralising the longlisting of candidates which largely locked out left wing candidates and those connected to Corbyn's leadership. The Times has noted that "Those who question his authority inevitably find Starmer sides with McSweeney." According to Patrick Maguire and Gabriel Pogrund of The Times, "McSweeney and his acolytes saw themselves as insurgents within the Labour Party. As long as Starmer’s private office was functional, they could control the party’s politics themselves — without interference from small-minded Westminster villagers. They knew that Starmer’s real life — his true self — was not the work they shared with him. Their political project was predicated on this unpolitical leader doing as he was told."

McSweeney led preparations for the 2024 general election, with Scotland being a priority target for his campaigning. McSweeney made contact with members of the US Democratic Party and Australian Labor Party, respectively Neera Tanden and Anthony Albanese, to discuss election tactics. He argued in a December 2023 shadow cabinet meeting that despite Labour's significant lead in national polls, six different elections from around the world were examples of leads reversing once campaigns began.

=== Head of political strategy ===
Following Labour's victory in the 2024 general election on 4 July, McSweeney was appointed the head of political strategy alongside Paul Ovenden.

Some media reports suggested in August that McSweeney had come into some tension with Starmer's chief of staff Sue Gray, with McSweeney being more politics-focused and Gray being governance-focused, both allegedly developing rival power centres within 10 Downing Street. McSweeney privately rejected the idea and insisted that he worked well with Gray. Later that month, it was reported that Gray had moved McSweeney's desk further from Starmer's office twice and that she had requested that he be denied access to a secure computer system. While some sources put forward that Gray suspected McSweeney's allies of accusing her through briefings of "micromanaging staff", other sources stated the two worked well together.

=== Downing Street chief of staff ===
Following the resignation of Sue Gray, McSweeney was appointed Downing Street Chief of Staff on 6 October 2024. Vidhya Alakeson and Jill Cuthbertson were appointed as his deputies.

In November 2025, Starmer sought to stop briefings by his allies that No 10 feared Wes Streeting could launch a leadership coup. Starmer gathered staff to stress that briefings against cabinet ministers were "unacceptable" after apologising to Streeting. His spokesperson said that Starmer also accepted assurances that No 10 staff had not briefed against Streeting and that he stood by his chief of staff. Previously, McSweeney was accused of briefing against Gray.

=== Mandelson-Epstein friendship scandal and resignation ===
In September 2025, when Peter Mandelson was dismissed as ambassador to the United States after further revelations of his close friendship with child sex offender Jeffrey Epstein, it was reported that McSweeney, who was known to be personally close to Mandelson, had been a "keen advocate" for Mandelson's appointment as ambassador despite his involvement with Epstein already being known, and despite concerns raised by the security services during the vetting process. It was further reported that McSweeney had urged government colleagues to defend Mandelson in the days before his eventual dismissal. Stephen Bush wrote in the Financial Times that the decision to appoint Mandelson as ambassador "raises questions" of Starmer and McSweeney's political judgement. Some Labour MPs were reportedly angry at McSweeney's influence, accusing him of promoting a factional, clique-driven style of politics, especially as allies of Starmer and McSweeney had recently been promoted during a cabinet reshuffle in September 2025.

In October 2025, McSweeney, who was then the Downing Street Chief of Staff, reported his government-issued phone stolen by a cyclist in Westminster. The incident gained significant attention in March 2026 following a parliamentary order for the government to release communications between McSweeney and Mandelson regarding the latter’s appointment as US ambassador. Critics, including Conservative opposition leader Kemi Badenoch, raised concerns about the timing of the theft, while Prime Minister Keir Starmer dismissed suggestions of a "cover-up" as "far-fetched". To provide transparency, the Metropolitan Police released a transcript of McSweeney’s 999 call, which revealed he initially provided an incorrect street name, leading to the case being recorded in the wrong location and subsequently closed. The Met has since reopened the investigation to reassess evidence in the correct area. In February 2026, Starmer defended McSweeney, saying he was an essential part of his team.

On 8 February 2026, following increasing pressure, McSweeney resigned as Starmer's chief of staff. In a written statement, McSweeney took responsibility for the decision to appoint Mandelson, acknowledging it was wrong and had damaged the party and trust in politics. He stated that stepping aside was "the only honourable course". McSweeney expressed pride in the government's achievements, stating that his motivation was always to support a Labour government focused on ordinary people. He also highlighted the importance of remembering the victims of Epstein. Although he did not oversee vetting, he called for it to be fundamentally overhauled. He concluded by affirming his support for Starmer's mission. Starmer accepted McSweeney’s resignation and issued a statement expressing gratitude for his service. Starmer stated that he and the Labour Party owe McSweeney a "debt of gratitude" for his years of service. He credited McSweeney with a central role in the party's electoral success, including the 2024 landslide majority. Starmer praised McSweeney's "dedication, loyalty and leadership" and said it had been an honour to work with him.

Following McSweeney's resignation, The Guardian described the move as a significant political shake-up, highlighting increased scrutiny of Downing Street's vetting procedures. Tim Allan resigned as Director of Communications the following day. Vidhya Alakeson and Jill Cuthbertson were appointed by Starmer as McSweeney's acting successors.

On 22 June 2026, following a a leadership crisis, Starmer resigned as Labour leader and prime minister.

=== After government ===
In April 2026, McSweeney was called to give evidence to the Foreign Affairs Select Committee on his role in Mandelson's security vetting. This followed former senior Foreign Office civil servant Olly Robbins alleging that the Prime Minister's office had a "dismissive" attitude towards the vetting process. McSweeney gave a statement to the committee apologising to the victims of Epstein, and was probed by the members of the committee into his role in the appointment of Mandelson as US Ambassador. When referring to revelations including pictures of Mandelson and Epstein that appeared following the former's appointment as ambassador, McSweeney stated it felt like a "knife to my soul". He denied that Mandelson was appointed because he was a "hero" or "mentor", and instead said his motives had been in the national interest throughout the process.

McSweeney attended the Kyiv Security Conference in April 2026. The Sunday Times stated that he was interested in how artificial intelligence might shape future elections in Ukraine.

In July 2026 McSweeney said that Labour had failed to properly prepare for government, and that he had failed around the appointment of Mandelson. He said he expected his next job would be outside politics.

=== Reputation ===
McSweeney acquired a reputation as a successful Labour organiser, leading campaigns to win a majority on the Lambeth London Borough Council and to defeat the far-right British National Party in Barking and Dagenham though his role and effectivness in relationship to this campaign and labour victory has been questioned. In September 2023, the New Statesman ranked McSweeney third on a list of the most influential left-wing figures in the UK and described him as Starmer's "most trusted aide". In the next edition of the list in June 2024, the magazine upgraded McSweeney to first place, naming him "the most influential person on the left today".

In February 2025, Bethany Dawson of Politico Europe stated that McSweeney "is seen as a key protagonist in the rise of Prime Minister Keir Starmer." James Ball of The New European described McSweeney in May 2025 as "a core foot soldier in the internal resistance to Corbyn during his leadership, and was behind efforts to stamp out dissent once Starmer won," saying that he "has risen to an astonishing level of power and influence with the government, not least through the brutally effective removal of internal rivals." In October 2023, The Times stated that "nobody without elected office wields as much power in British politics as McSweeney", and The Guardian described him as "the most influential backroom operator in the party".

Jason Cowley of the New Statesman compared McSweeney to Conservative Party adviser Dominic Cummings, saying that both "continue to exert a special fascination," among observers of British politics. John McTernan, who served as Tony Blair's director of political operations, described McSweeney as "the heir to Peter Mandelson."

== Political positions and ideology ==
Jason Cowley of New Statesman has described McSweeney as a "conservative social democrat." Andrew Grice of The Independent has described him as a "workerist with links to the Labour right." Gabriel Pogrund and Hugh O’Connell of The Sunday Times have described his politics as similar to "the old Labour right: a combination of patriotism, social conservatism, and traditional left economics." Lord Glasman of Blue Labour has stated that McSweeney "is from us."

According to George Eaton of New Statesman, McSweeney's political positions were marked by his activism in Lambeth, with McSweeney blaming "far-left sectarianism for enabling the abuse of hundreds of children in the borough’s care homes during the 1980s". According to Robert Shrimsley of The Financial Times, McSweeney believed that the leaderships of Ed Miliband and Jeremy Corbyn "saw Labour divorced from its key voters," and that McSweeney's "contempt for those who prioritised liberal ideals over the ordinary concerns of traditional and patriotic voters convinced him that Labour had to be saved from the left and that Corbynism had to be destroyed." Former Conservative Party minister Michael Gove wrote that McSweeney "believes Labour should fight for working people against the establishment, rather than seek comfortable accommodation with its institutions," and "wanted, above all, the Corbynites to lose, for the role they had played in damaging the Labour party."

== Personal life ==
McSweeney is married to Imogen Walker, a Labour politician who has served as the MP for Hamilton and Clyde Valley since 2024, and from September 2025 an assistant government whip. They have a son. McSweeney lives in Lanark, South Lanarkshire.

Preceded by Sue Gray	Downing Street Chief of Staff; 2024–2026	Succeeded by Vidhya Alakeson and Jill Cuthbertson
