= Paul Foot Award =

British journalism award

The Paul Foot Award is an annual award run by Private Eye, for investigative or campaigning journalism, in memory of journalist Paul Foot, who died in 2004.

The award was originally set up in 2005 by The Guardian and Private Eye, for material published in print or online during the previous year. The award was discontinued in 2015, but revived by Private Eye in 2017.

The winner of the prize is awarded £8,000 and runners-up receive £1,500 per entry. Prior to 2024, £5,000 was given to the winner and £1,000 to each of five runners-up.

== Winners ==
=== 2005 ===
John Sweeney of the Daily Mail for his investigation into "Shaken Baby Syndrome" which led to the wrongly imprisoned mothers Sally Clark, Angela Cannings and Donna Anthony being freed and resulted in the exposure of the prosecution's chief witness, the paediatrician Sir Roy Meadow.

=== 2006 ===
David Harrison for his three-part investigation into sex trafficking in Eastern Europe published in The Sunday Telegraph, which was praised by the UN and prompted action by British police and the Home Office.

=== 2007 ===
Shared by Deborah Wain (Doncaster Free Press) for her exposé of corruption in the Doncaster Education City project and by David Leigh and Rob Evans (The Guardian) for their investigation into bribery in the British arms trade.

=== 2008 ===
The top prize of £3,000 each was awarded to Camilla Cavendish of The Times for an investigation into the many injustices which have resulted from the Children Act 1989 and the professional cultures that have grown up around child "protection"; and Richard Brooks of Private Eye for his investigation into the mismanagement and financial irregularities surrounding the sale of the UK government's international development business, Actis. Four runners-up were each awarded £1,000:

- Andrew Gilligan (London Evening Standard) on financial irregularities in London City Hall and the London Development Agency
- Warwick Mansell (TES) on the Sats test marking scandal
- Dan McDougall (The Observer) on how children made clothes for Esprit, Primark and Gap in India, Pakistan, Nepal and Bangladesh
- Jim Oldfield (Rossington Community Newsletter, South Yorkshire Newspapers) on how landowners and speculators planned to build an eco-town in Rossington against the wishes of residents

=== 2009 ===
At a presentation ceremony at the Spin Bar in London's Millbank Tower on 2 November 2009, the £5,000 Paul Foot Award for Campaigning Journalism 2009 was awarded to Ian Cobain of The Guardian for his long-running investigation into Britain's involvement in the torture of terror suspects detained overseas. Five runners-up received £1,000 each:

- Jonathan Calvert and Clare Newell (Sunday Times) on a number of financial and legislative abuses in the Lords which had previously escaped scrutiny
- Ben Leapman (Sunday Telegraph and Daily Telegraph) on MPs' exploitation of parliamentary allowances to subsidise their lifestyles and multiple homes
- Paul Lewis (The Guardian) on the death of Ian Tomlinson at the 2009 G20 London summit protests
- Rob Waugh (The Yorkshire Post) on cavalier spending at Leeds Beckett University, the takeover of Sheffield Wednesday football club, and the mismanagement of Leeds City Credit Union
- Stephen Wright and Richard Pendlebury (Daily Mail) on the lawyer Shahrokh Mireskandari, and his criminal past and the bogus nature of his qualifications and claims of experience

=== 2010 ===
Clare Sambrook for her investigating, reporting and campaigning against the government policy of locking up asylum-seeking families in conditions known to harm their mental health, and scrutinising the commercial contractors who run the detention centres for profit. A Special Lifetime Campaign Award of £2,000 was also presented to Eamonn McCann for his 40 years of campaigning journalism on behalf of the victims of Bloody Sunday. Each of the runners-up on the shortlist received £1,000. These were, in alphabetical order:

- Jonathan Calvert and Clare Newell (Sunday Times) on MPs and peers seeking cash for influence
- David Cohen (Evening Standard) on the plight of the poor in London, including children's poverty and the continuing existence of paupers' graves in the capital
- Nick Davies (Guardian) on phone-hacking conducted by the News of the World when Andy Coulson, later the government's director of communications, was editor
- Linda Geddes (New Scientist) on evidence that DNA tests are not always accurately interpreted

=== 2011 ===
Nick Davies (The Guardian and guardian.co.uk) for a series of articles that helped to expose the scale of phone-hacking at the News of the World, beginning in July 2009 with the first report that phone hacking went beyond a single jailed journalist. Two years later, Davies, with colleague Amelia Hill, revealed that the News of the World had targeted voicemails left for the missing schoolgirl Milly Dowler, which led to a public backlash against the Sunday tabloid. The award organising committee praised Davies for his "dogged and lonely reporting" the impact of which forced "a humbled Rupert Murdoch to close the News of the World and abandon his planned buyout of the satellite broadcaster, BSkyB, and forced the country's most senior police officer to resign". The judges commented that "This award is recognition of the cheering truth that the best journalism exposed the worst." Runners-up were Jonathan Calvert and Claire Newell for their The Sunday Times articles exposing corruption in FIFA. Also nominated were:

- Jon Austin (Basildon Echo) – Dale Farm evictions
- Katherine Quarmby (The Guardian, The Times, Mail on Sunday, Prospect magazine and others) – Disability hate crime awareness
- David Rose (Live magazine, Mail on Sunday/Mail Online) – UK aid to India
- Zoe Smeaton (Chemist + Druggist magazine, UBM Medica) – Government payment errors to community pharmacists
- Jerome Taylor (The Independent) – Open justice and the Court of Protection
- Mark Townsend (The Observer) – Exploitation of women and children trafficked into the UK

=== 2012 ===
Andrew Norfolk (The Times) for "a two-year investigation into the grooming and sexual exploitation of teenage girls". The runner-up was Rob Waugh (Yorkshire Post) for his exposure of mis-spending by senior officers of Cleveland Police and abuse of power by ACPO and CPOSA. A Special Campaign Award was made to Stephen Wright (Daily Mail) for his "tireless reporting over 15 years" on the Stephen Lawrence murder investigation and Justice for Stephen campaign. Also nominated were:

- Tom Bergin (Thomson Reuters) – Corporate tax avoidance by Vodafone and Starbucks
- Jonathan Calvert and Heidi Blake (Sunday Times) – Tory treasurer sells access to PM/Retired generals lobby for defence contracts
- Ted Jeory (Blog: trialbyjeory.wordpress.com) – Corruption in the borough of Tower Hamlets
- Alexi Mostrous and Fay Schlesinger (The Times) – Secrets of the tax avoiders
- Claire Newell, Graeme Paton, Holly Watt and Robert Winnet (Daily Telegraph) – GCSE and A-level examiners advising teachers on how to improve pupils' results

=== 2013 ===
David Cohen – (Evening Standard) for his work on gangs, which was part of the Standard's Frontline London campaign. The Guardian's Snowden team (James Ball, Julian Borger, Nick Davies, Nick Hopkins, Paul Johnson and Alan Rusbridger) received a Special Investigation Award for its investigation into the extent of mass surveillance undertaken by GCHQ – The Snowden Files: How GCHQ watches your every move. Also nominated were:

- Tom Bergin (Reuters) – Corporate tax practices
- Jonathan Calvert and Heidi Blake (The Sunday Times) – Westminster for Sale
- Aasma Day (Lancashire Evening Post) – Life on the margins of society: Preston Twilight Investigation
- James Dean (The Times) – Fakes, fraud and forgery in Lloyds selling scandal

=== 2014 (joint winners) ===
Jonathan Calvert and Heidi Blake (Sunday Times) for "The Fifa Files" in which they reported on a campaign waged by Mohammed Bin Hammam, Qatar's top football official, and how he exploited his position to help secure the votes Qatar needed to win the bid to host the 2022 World Cup; Richard Brooks and Andrew Bousfield (Private Eye) for "Shady Arabia and the Desert Fix", a long-running investigation into corruption on a contract between the governments of the UK and Saudi Arabia. Also nominated were:

- Richard Pendlebury (Daily Mail) – Migrant Lives
- Claire Newell, Holly Watt, Claire Duffin and Ben Bryant (Daily Telegraph) – Qatar 2022 World Cup Bid
- George Monbiot (The Guardian) – How farmers caused the floods
- Mark Townsend (The Observer) – Sexual abuse of women at Yarl's Wood
- Dominic Ponsford and William Turvill (Press Gazette) – Save Our Sources

=== 2017 ===
Emma Youle (Hackney Gazette) for her investigation, "The Hidden Homeless: £35m to keep the homeless homeless", which revealed Hackney's enormous hidden homeless problem—highlighting the plight of the thousands who live in temporary accommodation. Also nominated were:

- Daniel Balint-Kurti & Leigh Baldwin (Global Witness) – The Deceivers
- Katherine Faulkner (Daily Mail) – How Royal Mail helps conmen defraud the elderly
- Will Hurst (The Architects' Journal) – The Garden Bridge investigation
- Billy Kenber (The Times) – Drug company profiteering
- Maeve McClenaghan & Crina Boros (Energydesk) – Big fish barons squeeze out small-scale fishermen
- Daniel Taylor (The Guardian/The Observer) – Football's sexual abuse scandal

=== 2018 ===
Amelia Gentleman (The Guardian) for her investigation, "Long-term UK residents classed as illegal immigrants", which centred on tightened immigration regulations and the catastrophic consequences for a group of elderly Commonwealth-born citizens who were told they were illegal immigrants, despite having lived in the UK for around 50 years but with no formal paperwork to prove it. Also nominated were:

- Gordon Blackstock (The Sunday Post) – Hundreds of orphans buried in mass grave
- Carole Cadwalladr (The Observer) – The Cambridge Analytica files
- Madison Marriage (Financial Times) – Men only: inside the charity fundraiser where hostesses were put on show
- Sean O'Neill (The Times) – Oxfam sex scandal cover-up
- BuzzFeed News Investigations team (Heidi Blake, Tom Warren, Richard Holmes, Jason Leopold, Jane Bradley, Alex Campbell) – From Russia with blood

In addition, the Young Journalist Award was given to Ben Van Der Merwe and Emma Yeomans (London Student) for their investigation, "Toby Young and UCL's secret eugenics conference", about secretive annual conferences at UCL that covered genetic difference and intelligence, which was jointly published in Private Eye.

=== 2019 ===
Emily Dugan (Buzzfeed) for the Access To Justice campaign, reporting the human cost of the degradation of England's justice and legal aid system. Also nominated were:

- Ian Birrell (Mail on Sunday) - Autistic youngsters locked up
- Richard Brooks (Private Eye) – Conservative Party Treasurer
- Phil Coleman (Carlisle News and Star) – Fake Shrink
- Tom Kelly (Daily Mail) – Fleeced by fake taxmen
- Claire Newell and Team (Daily Telegraph) – MeToo Businessman Scandal

=== 2020 ===
Alexandra Heal (Bureau of Investigative Journalism/various outlets) for the Nowhere to Turn series, reporting on how police forces handle domestic abuse complaints against their own officers. Also nominated were:

- Kit Chellel, Joe Light and Ruth Olurounbi (Bloomberg Businessweek) – Is one of the world's biggest lawsuits built on a sham?
- Charles Thomson (Yellow Advertiser) – Investigation into paedophile police informant
- Tom Warren and Katie JM Baker (BuzzFeed News) – WWF's secret war
- Nadine White and Emma Youle (HuffPost UK) – SPAC Nation investigation
- Frances Ryan (The Guardian/Tribune) – Britain's disability scandal

=== 2021 ===
Robert Smith and team (Financial Times) for "The Unravelling of Lex Greensill", reporting on the Greensill scandal.

- Highly Commended: Jack Shenker (Tortoise Media) – Death at the Ministry
- Matthew Weaver, Pippa Crerar & Jeremy Armstrong (Daily Mirror/The Guardian) – Dominic Cummings/Barnard Castle
- Guardian Investigations Team, with lead reporters Felicity Lawrence and David Conn (The Guardian) – Covid and the Conservative chumocracy
- Harriet Clugston and team (JPIMedia) – Modern slavery in the UK
- Peter Geoghegan, Jenna Corderoy & Lucas Amin (openDemocracy) – How the UK government is undermining FoI
- Jonathan Calvert & George Arbuthnott (The Sunday Times) – Failures of State: Britain's coronavirus scandal

=== 2022 ===
Hannah Al-Othman and David Collins (The Sunday Times) for "The Murder of Agnes Wanjiru". Shortlist:

- Samantha Asumadu (openDemocracy) – "Prisoners may have been refused parole due to fake crimes on file"
- Susie Boniface (Daily Mirror) – "Look Me in the Eye", campaign for recognition for the survivors of Britain's nuclear testing programme
- Solomon Hughes (Private Eye) – "Pay Slippery – Tax fraud on government Covid test sites"
- Gabriel Pogrund (The Sunday Times) – "Royal access", how Prince Charles' household promised honours and access in exchange for charity donations
- Eleanor Rose, Jessica Purkiss, Mirren Gidda, Aaron Walawalkar (Liberty Investigates) and Mark Townsend (The Observer) – "Despair and death in Britain's asylum system"

=== 2023 ===
David Conn (The Guardian) for reporting on Conservative peer Michelle Mone and the PPE Medpro controversy. Also nominated were:

- Phil Coleman (Newsquest Cumbria) – Human rights group condemns "dangerous" police taser use
- Paul Morgan-Bentley (The Times) – British Gas breaking into the homes of the vulnerable
- Gabriel Pogrund, Harry Yorke (The Sunday Times) – The BBC chairman, the prime minister and the £800,000 loan guarantee
- Matt Shea, Jamie Tahsin, Tim Hume (Vice World News) – The dangerous rise of Andrew Tate
- Hannah Summers (The Observer/The Guardian) – The use of unregulated psychologists in the family courts

=== 2024 ===
Tristan Kirk (Evening Standard) for his entry "Single Justice Procedure: Conveyer Belt Justice", criticising the process for removing fairness from the law. Also nominated were:

- Antonia Cundy, Madison Marriage, Paul Caruana Galizia (Financial Times/Tortoise Media) – Investigation into Crispin Odey
- Anthony Lane, Humberto J Rocha (OPIS) – Stopping carbon windfalls for big polluters closing plants
- Lewis McBlane (The Northern Scot) – A96 dualling: a Moray cover-up
- Justine Smith (The House magazine) – CAMHS in crisis

Rebecca Thomas (The Independent) – Failures in the UK mental health system

=== 2025 ===
Patrick Butler and Josh Halliday (The Guardian) for their entry "The Carer's Allowance Scandal", for reporting on the overpayments scandal around Carer's Allowance, criticising the process for removing fairness from the law. Also nominated were:

- Charlie Brinkhurst-Cuff (The Guardian/Reuters Institute) – Out of Sight: Missing People campaign
- Laura Hughes (Financial Times) – Lead poisoning
- Aaron Walawalkar & Harriet Clugston (Liberty Investigates in partnership with Sky News/Metro/The Guardian) – UK universities' Gaza protest crackdown
- Jim Waterson (LondonCentric) – Lime bikes and broken legs
- Abi Whistance (The Liverpool Post) – Big Help Project investigation

=== 2026 ===
Peter Geoghegan & Khadija Sharife (Democracy for Sale) for their entry "How Labour Together hired a PR firm to target journalists", for reporting on Labour Together hiring a PR firm to build dossiers on reputable journalists with the intent to discredit them. Also nominated were:

- Lindsay Bruce (The Press and Journal) – Trapped by RAAC Campaign
- Adam Bychawski (Big Issue) – How the UK fails victims of miscarriages of justice
- Joe Duggan (The i Paper) – Silicosis scandal of killer kitchen worktops
- Chloe Hadjimatheou (The Observer) – The real Salt Path investigation
- Daniel Timms, Mollie Simpson, Dan Hayes, Jack Walton, Abi Whistance (Sheffield Tribune) – Andrew Milne: the litigious bully who demanded five-figure sums from homeowners

== See also ==
- British Press Awards
- James Cameron Award for Journalism
- List of British journalism awards
- Orwell Prize
- Sam Adams Award
- What the Papers Say Award
