= Carer's Allowance overpayments scandal =

UK scandal involving overpayments of social security benefits

The Carer's Allowance Overpayments Scandal refers to the overpayment of Carer's Allowance benefit in the UK that led to carers owing the Department for Work and Pensions thousands. The overpayments affected thousands of unpaid carers and has been compared to the British Post Office scandal.

== Background ==
Carers within the UK are eligible for Carer's Allowance if they spend 35 hours a week providing regular care for someone who is disabled and claims one of the qualifying disability benefits. They must be 16 or over, live in England or Wales, and not be in full time education. Claiming Carer's Allowance can cause the carer's Universal Credit or State Pension to be reduced. Carers Allowance is paid out by the Department for Work and Pensions (DWP). Between 2023 and 2024 there were 903,000 claimants within England and Wales.

In 2024, Carer's Allowance was set at £81.90 a week and had an earning threshold of £151 a week. If a claimant earned more than the £151 threshold, they would not longer be eligible for Carer's Allowance. This meant that if a claimant earned £1 above the £151 threshold, they would need to repay the DWP the entire £81.90 Carer's Allowance. The threshold often caused claimants to be overpaid and these overpayments often built up before the DWP made the claimant aware of them. Between 2023 and 2024 over 50% of Carer's Allowance DWP Debt Management cases were linked to an overpayment.

In May 2018 the Work and Pensions Select Committee called on the UK Government to remove the earnings threshold, calling it a "cliff-edge" that leaves carers worse off for working. In October 2019 they again criticised the administration of Carer's Allowance. They found that out of date systems in the DWP and staff shortages led to backlogs in checking overpayments, leading to carer's building up substantial debts. The committee advised that any overpayments caused by DWP's administrative failings should be investigated further with the possibility of writing the debts off. The government rejected this recommendation. Peter Schofield, Permanent Secretary for the DWP, refused to apologise for the debts but promised that overpayments would no longer be an issue due to the introduction of the verified earnings and pensions tool.

== Guardian investigation ==
In April 2024, The Guardian began covering cases of Carer's Allowance overpayments. They reported that 134,500 carers were repaying overpayment debts totalling £251m and that one in five Carer's Allowance claimants ran up overpayments. Their investigation came as Vivienne Groom, a carer who also worked a minimum wage job, was prosecuted by the DWP over a £16,800 overpayment. Groom had already agreed to repay the debt in instalments, but when her mother died Groom inherited £16,000. The DWP began legal proceedings against Groom under the Proceeds of Crime Act. Groom had no legal representation and plead guilty to the charges. Her inheritance was seized and she was sentenced to an unpaid work community order.

The Guardian investigation found multiple cases of carers who owed the DWP thousands due to the earnings threshold. One case involved a carer who went over the threshold by £4.40 a week, totalling £58. As a result, they were told to repay £1,715 and a £50 civil penalty. One carer was only contacted by the DWP when his overpayments totalled £19,506.20. The DWP prosecuted him for fraud and he was found guilty. He claimed the DWP then pressured him to sell his house, which eventually enabled him to repay his debt. The investigation also questioned why the DWP pursued prosecutions against carers, even when carers were willing to repay the debts. Criteria for prosecutions included the debts totalling more than £5,000, evidence of fraud or a prior conviction for benefit fraud. In May 2025 Carers UK found that at least £357m had been incorrectly paid over the prior 6 years due to administrative mistakes.

Patrick Butler and Josh Halliday won the Paul Foot Award in May 2025 for their coverage of the scandal.

=== Whistleblower ===
The investigation also covered the sacking of Enrico La Rocca, a whistleblower who first raised concerns Carer's Allowance overpayments in 2010. In 2016 they proceeded to make two formal complains, including a letter written to Robert Devereux, the DWP permanent secretary at the time. La Rocca, who was not named at the time, contacted Welfare Minister Sarah Newton, the National Audit Office (NAO), and the Work and Pensions Select Committee Frank Field in 2018. His concerns directly led to the NAO report being published in April 2019. But La Rocca's complaint was closed by the DWP in 2017, with the department stating it did not intend to correspond further with La Rocca. Schofield assured MPs that the whistleblower would be protected, but La Rocca was fired in May 2020. His firing came after the DWP found that he had privately written to the Crown Prosecution Service, urging that the NAO report was made available to judges ruling over any Carer's Allowance overpayment cases. Following his firing, La Rocca contacted the Work and Pensions Select Committee chair Stephen Timms, who raised a complaint over the firing. In April 2021 La Rocca was reinstated in a different department.

In 2025 La Rocca was blocked from giving evidence to the Independent Review of Carer's Allowance Overpayments by DWP staff, citing the Osmotherly Rules. The Public and Commercial Services Union argued the rules didn't apply to independent reviews, a view that the DWP later agreed with.

=== The verify earnings and pensions tool (VEP) ===
In 2018 Carer's Allowance introduced the verified earnings and pensions tool, known as VEP. The tool allowed the DWP to check real time earnings of carers using data from HMRC. Schofield promised that use of this tool would put an end to Carer's Allowance overpayments as DWP staff would be alerted when carers earnings tipped over the threshold. But it was later discovered that only half of the alerts were being acted upon, due to staffing budget cuts.

=== DWP response ===
Following the reporting the DWP maintained that they were not responsible for overpayments, rather that claimants should have been aware of their income and reported any changes in their earnings.

== Government response ==
In May 2024 the Government announced they were considering sending email or text notifications to carers who were overpaid. The Work and Pensions Select Committee sent a letter to Welfare Secretary Mel Stride, calling for the DWP to introduce changes to ensure carers were not longer subjected to overpayments. The NAO also announced that they would be undertaking a second investigation into Carer's Allowance overpayments.

In October 2024 Liz Kendall, the Secretary of State for Work and Pensions, announced the commission of an independent review into Carer's Allowance overpayments. Liz Sayce was appointed as the commission chair. The government also announced that the earnings threshold would be raised by £45 a week, allowing carers to earn up to £196 a week alongside their caring role from April 2025.

In April 2025 the government announced that they were investing £800,000 to fully staff the Carer's Allowance unit. The DWP had been ordered to ensure all VEP alerts were investigated and that carers be swiftly contacted before they risked falling into debt.

== Independent Review of Carer’s Allowance Overpayments ==
The Independent Review of Carer's Allowance Overpayments headed by Liz Sayce and published on the 25 November 2025. The review found that carers were not to blame for their overpayments, but rather that systemic issues within the DWP made it impossible for carers to report their earnings. It found that Carer's Allowance actively disincentivised carers from working, in opposition to the government's aims to encourage the labour market. The limit also prevented carers for accepting any pay higher than the minimum wage. Carers were left feeling ashamed and suicidal as a result of the overpayments, and disabled claimants were often sent information inaccessible formats.

The review was critical of the Carer's Allowance's Earnings Averaging, which was intended to average out income for claimants with fluctuating incomes. It found that the systems in place for averaging didn't account for modern working patterns making it impossible for carers to understand when they may tip over the earnings threshold. Regulations for Earnings Averaging were found to be lacking in definitions and clear guidelines, leaving choices around averaging up to individual DWP decision makers. When cases went to tribunal, often contradictory rulings were made, mudding case law. While the DWP had the ability to waive debts in some cases, this was rarely done, with only 11 waivers occurring between 2022 and 2025.

It was found that only 50% of VEP alerts were investigated as a cost saving measure, to reduce benefit expenditure. As only half of the alerts were investigated, this allowed large repayments to accrue over time. The queue was reordered three times a day when new data arrived with the queue having a lifespan of 187 days. Alerts that hadn't been acted on in that time, or updated would then expire. All these factors combined meant that alerts could be stuck in the queue for extended periods of time allowing debts to accumulate. In one case, an alert was in the system for over 5 years with no action taken.

DWP were also criticised for their usage of outdated software, which initially went online in 1997. In 2015 the software was updated, but it still lacked vital features like being able to find customer information on other DWP systems.

The review finished by making 40 recommendations for the DWP and UK Government.

== Review's impact ==
In November 2025 the government announced it would be accepting 38 of the reports 40 recommendations. In addition, the DWP planned to review over 200,000 Carer's Allowance overpayment debts that occurred between 2015 and 2025 with the possibility of some cases having their debts reduced or cleared. The government set aside £75m to address the scandal, with the majority of the funding paying for staff to reassess previous overpayments.

In December 2025 Neil Couling, the director general of DWP, wrote an internal blogpost for Whitehall colleagues where he claimed that the blame for the overpayments scandal lay with carers who failed to report their income. His comments drew criticism from MPs, charities, and Sayce as it opposed the review's findings and the government's response. By February 2026 the Work and Pensions Select Committee were pressuring Schofield over the DWP's response to the independent review, as they believed the senior team were refusing to accept the findings. This led to MPs considering opening a new inquiry into scandal in May 2026.

The review of overpayment cases began on 13 April 2026, with claimants being told they would be contacted by the DWP if their case had been impacted by the scandal. However, some claimants were still being served overpayment notices and others struggled to get their Carer's Allowance stopped following the death of the person they cared for.

By September 2026, charities began raising concerns about the pace of the reassessments, after it was revealed only 3000 cases had been reviewed. Timms, who became Minister of State for Social Security and Disability in July 2024, claimed this was is in line with the DWP's planned timescale but Carers UK calculated that if the reassessments continued this pace, it would take 27 years to complete.

In October 2026 John Healey, the Chancellor of the Exchequer, said that the 2026 United Kingdom budget would include a new "digital taper" system for carer's allowance, replacing the controversial "cliff-edge rule", a day before the official presentation of the budget to the House of Commons.

== See also ==
- Carer's Allowance
- Liz Sayce
- Department for Work and Pensions
