= Carer's Allowance =

UK social security benefit for carers

Carer's Allowance is a non-contributory benefit in the United Kingdom, payable to people who care for a disabled person for at least 35 hours a week. It was first established as Invalid Care Allowance in 1976, and married women were not eligible. This policy was held to be unlawful sexual discrimination by the European Court in 1986 in the case of Jackie Drake. In May 2020 around 1.1 million people in England were entitled to Carer’s Allowance, of which 780,000 people were being paid it, according to the National Audit Office.

== History ==
Invalid Care Allowance was initially introduced in 1976, after the publication of the government White paper Social Security Provision for Chronically Sick and Disabled People, which was published in 1974. The paper made a case for the provision of a benefit for carers of disabled people. The benefit is intended to be an income replacement for people who forgo other earnings due to their role providing substantial care for someone. Claimants don't need to contribute to be eligible and the benefit has never been fully means tested, unlike benefits like Universal Credit. Claimants are allowed to work alongside their carer role, but may lose their entitlement to Carer's Allowance if they go over a defined threshold.

Initially, only single men or women could claim the benefit if they cared for someone who was their relative. In 1981, the entitlement was expanded to cover non-relatives. However, married women were unable to claim the benefit until 1986.

The change in eligibly was made after Jacqueline Drake began a legal case against the UK Government. Drake was a married woman who had given up paid work in order to care for her mother, who had dementia. Her claim was refused due to her marital status and she challenged the refusal through a legal case at the European Court of Justice. The court ruled that excluding married women was contrary to the principles of equality that social security aimed to provide. Following the expansion, the number of claims expanded from 20,000 to 110,000. In 2023, 73% of Carer's Allowance claimants were women.

Invalid Care Allowance was renamed to Carer's Allowance in 2003. The change was made following a policy review in 1999. The change also implemented eight weeks of payments for claimants following the death of the person they cared for.

== Conditions ==
To be eligible for Carer's Allowance, the claimant must be caring for at least 35 hours per week for a disabled person who is in receipt of one of the below:

- Disability Living Allowance (middle or higher rate of the care component)
- Attendance Allowance
- Constant Attendance Allowance
- Personal Independence Payment (daily living component)
- Armed Forces Independence Payment

The claimant must have been present in Great Britain for 104 weeks out of the 156 weeks before claiming (two out of the last three years) and pass the habitual residence test.

The claimant must be over 16 years of age.

=== Excluded groups ===
People in full-time education and those who earn more than £196 per week, from employment or self-employment, are not entitled to Carer's Allowance. Net earnings are used (after tax, National Insurance Contributions and allowable expenses including half of any pension contributions, work-related expenses such as the cost of a lease car, and up to 100% of care costs). Income from occupational pensions and investment income is not considered as earned income, and is not included.

== Amount ==
£83.30 per week from April 2025 to April 2026. It is taxable and counts as earned income.

== Scotland ==
As of September 2018, the Scottish Government's social security agency, Social Security Scotland, makes extra payments to Scottish residents who are in receipt of Carer's Allowance on specific "qualifying dates," known as the Carer's Allowance Supplement. This payment is paid twice a year and does not need to be applied for. The first payment was £221.

In 2023 Scotland replaced Carer's Allowance, with the Scottish specific Carer Support Payment. The rollout of this benefit was piloted, with new applicants applying for Carer Support Payment. Existing claimant's began to be moved to Carers Support Payment in February 2024 with the change over being made automatically.

== Effect on other benefits ==
Counts in full as income for means-tested benefits but carries with it an entitlement to a Carer's Premium on all means-tested benefits, even if Carer's Allowance is not actually paid because of the overlapping rules. (You can’t normally get two income-replacement benefits, e.g. Carer's Allowance and the State Pension, paid together.)

If you can't be paid Carer's Allowance because of this rule, you have an ‘underlying entitlement’ to Carer's Allowance instead. This might mean you could get:

- the extra amount for carers in Pension Credit
- the carer element in Universal Credit

If there is a person claiming Carer's Allowance in respect of a disabled person then the disabled person cannot qualify for the Severe Disability Premium in any means-tested benefit. The claimant is entitled to a National Insurance credit to protect pension rights.

== Carer's Allowance overpayment scandal ==
In 2016 a Department for Work and Pensions (DWP) whistleblower complained to Robert Devereux, who was the DWP permanent secretary at the time. The complaint concerned the DWP's failure to manage Carer's Allowance overpayments and how this was causing carers to accidentally land in large debts. The whistleblowers' complaint was closed a year later.

A report into the handling of carers allowance was published by the National Audit Office (NAO) and MPs in 2019. It was critical of how the DWP handled Carer's Allowance, specifically criticising how long it took the DWP to recognise and handle cases of overpayment. DWP's treatment of carers was called "heartless" and found that many of the debts were caused by DWP's own failures.

Peter Schofield, the DWP's permanent secretary at the time, spoke at a select committee hearing and insisted that the problem was under control. He claimed that the department was considering sending text warnings to carers who go over their earning limits and planned to use data matching software to prevent overpayments before they happened.

In April 2024 The Guardian released an investigation into the state of Carer's Allowance overpayments, revealing that tens of thousands of carers were still being pursued for overpayment debts. The DWP had taken some carers to court for fraud over the debts, and it was found that 134,500 carers were repaying debts as of April 2024. The amount at that time totalled £251m. The Labour government launched an independent review into the Carer's Allowance overpayments in October, headed by Liz Sayce. It was published on the 25 November 2025 and found that carers were not to blame for their overpayments, but rather that systemic issues within the DWP made it impossible for carers to report their earnings.

The UK government accepted 38 of the reports 40 recommendations and announced that the DWP will review over 200,000 Carer's Allowance overpayment debts that occurred between 2015-2025 with the possibility of some cases having their debts reduced or cleared.

== See also ==
- Carers rights movement
- Carer's Allowance overpayments scandal
- Department for Work and Pensions
