= Pogrund =

Pogrund is a surname. Notable people with the surname include:

- Benjamin Pogrund (born 1933), South African-born Israeli author
- Gabriel Pogrund, British journalist
