= Access to Work =

UK disability work scheme

Access to Work is a publicly funded employment support programme by the Government of the United Kingdom for disabled people that was introduced in 1994. It is run by the Department for Work and Pensions and aims to support disabled people start or stay in work by providing workplace adjustments, specialist equipment, and funding for support workers.

== History ==
Access to Work was introduced in 1994, to help support individuals with disabilities begin, or stay in work. The programme is run by the Department for Work and Pensions and provides discretionary workplace adjustments that would go beyond what is normally expected by an employer to provide. Grants for the scheme pays for support in the workplace, including specialist equipment, support workers, and changes to the workplace. In 2011, Liz Sayce published a study that found every £1 spent on Access to Work led to the Exchequer recouping £1.48.

Following Remploy's factory closures in 2012, workers who were employed as part of the scheme were advised to apply for Access to Work, with the goal of finding employment in a mainstream workplace. The closures followed news that the Remploy scheme was spending £25,000 a year to keep each disabled employee in work. In comparison, the government found that it would cost £2,900 a year to support an individual through Access to work. The government saved around £63 million from the factory closures, with £15m of those savings being reinvested into Access to Work.

In March 2018, DWP commissioned the National Centre for Social Research to perform a feasibility study to see if it was possible to conduct an impact evaluation using existing data. They found that there was a lack of appropriate data needed for such an evaluation and that a bespoke survey was needed. They anticipated that such a study would be costly.

=== Access to Work Plus ===
Following the findings in the 2023 Health and Disability white paper, Access to Work began considering new ways to provide support to disabled people with higher needs. The pilot, called Access to Work Plus, was rolled out between May 2022 and March 2024. The scheme introduced the enhanced personal element, which allowed for further support that Access to Work was normally unable to cover. The employer element was also introduced, which provided a financial incentive for employers who adjusted job roles to accommodate for disabled employees. This incentive consisted of a payment, that could be up to £3,000 annually.

The scheme was evaluated by King's College London who published their findings in 2025. They found that the ongoing backlog of applications worsened participants view of the scheme, even when they later felt supported by the pilot. Delays in payments caused problems in some cases, with employers having to ask employees to stop working until the Access to Work Plus funding came through. However, participants praised the personalised support provided by job aides and job coaches.

== Planned reforms ==
In 2024 Liz Kendall announced that the government planned to reform Access to Work, with the goal of getting more people into work. By 2024 applications for Access to Work had more than doubled from the 2018 figures, causing a backlog of that had grown by almost 60,000 cases between March 2020 and February 2026. This caused the average time for applications to be processed to grow from 28 days to 100.5 days. The programme had also not undergone any form of impact evaluation or substantial changes since its introduction in 1994. Stephen Timms said the scheme's growth was "unlikely to be sustainable", with the government looking at ways to reduce the costs.

By 2025, disabled people were concerned that Access to Work's funding had been cut. Timms, the Minister of State for Social Security and Disability, reassured Parliament that no support had been cut in July 2025, but later admitted in October that he had asked DWP staff to be more “scrupulous” with applications. At the end of October the Pathways to Work green paper was published, which considered future potential options for Access to Work. These included providing direct employer support to make workplaces more accessible, provide targeting funding, and potentially sharing the market for assistive technology allowing for lowered costs.

It was announced in January 2026 that the new Independent Disability Advisory Panel, chaired by Zara Todd, would be looking into Access to Work's provisions. In February 2026 the National Audit Office published its report into Access to work, where it found that the DWP had gaps in its data and that the DWP itself did not know if the scheme provided value for money. The DWP was also unaware if the support provided was of benefit to individuals. The report found that extensive delays has caused individuals to lose job offers and delays in reimbursement was causing cash flow issues for some businesses. When the report was published Disability Rights UK claimed the application delays had grown to 210 days long. In March, Peter Schofield suggested that disabled people and employers may be "misusing" the scheme.

Following increasing wait times for support, Pat McFadden announced in May 2026 that the DWP would be hiring 480 additional staff to help process applications. It is hoped this would help clear the 57,000 case backlog by September 2027. In June, the Public Accounts Committee published a report into Access to Work, finding that even with the increased staffing it was expected to take between 18 months to two years to clear the application backlog. It also reported that the programme had failed to adapt to modern ways of working and didn't work well for self employed individuals or those working part time.
