= Maria Ludkin =

British lawyer (born in 1965)

- Born: 1965 (age 60–61)
- Occupations: Lawyer, activist
- Notable credit: GMB Trade Union

Maria Ludkin (born in 1965) was a lawyer for the GMB Trade Union, the third biggest union in the United Kingdom. She speaks frequently in relation to prominent GMB campaigns. In particular, some of the less well known impacts of private equity on the economy and employment, which led to the calling of Treasury Select Committee hearings, and in relation to redundancies at Marks & Spencer. She has been involved in major GMB campaigns regarding proposed Remploy closures, equal pay, the Swindon hospital workers dispute and construction industry blacklisting, where litigation led to historic compensation payments.

In 2016, GMB ran a test case establishing that Uber drivers were in fact workers with employment rights, rather than self-employed, as Uber claimed. As one of the first major cases testing the proliferation of bogus self-employment and loss of employment rights in the so-called "gig economy", the case has been called "the employment law case of the decade".

Ludkin speaks regularly at conferences regarding shareholder activism, the impact of financial deregulation, as well as developments in good corporate governance and corporate social responsibility and the impact on labour of the gig economy.

In May 2014, the GMB and the Communication Workers Union launched the first trade union-owned law firm in the country, UnionLine, to provide a legal service for almost one million trade union members and their families. Ludkin was a director of that award-winning firm.

She is a member of the oversight board of the ESG Institute.

In 2018, Ludkin was named in The Lawyer's "Hot 100" list, which seeks to recognise the best lawyers in the country.

Previously, Ludkin was a lawyer in the art world for ten years, working for Christie's in London and New York, as well as working with a range of significant technology firms during their early growth in Silicon Valley.

In March 2018, Ludkin became chief counsel at Waveoptics, a market leader in hardware components for the AR industry.
