= Paul Foot =

Paul Foot may refer to:

- Paul Foot (comedian) (born 1973), English comedian
- Paul Foot (journalist) (1937–2004), British investigative journalist, political campaigner and author

== See also ==
- Paul Foot Award
