= Paul Ovenden =

British political adviser

Head of Political Strategy
- In office 5 July 2024 – 15 September 2025 Serving with Morgan McSweeney (until 6 October 2024)
- Prime Minister: Keir Starmer
- Preceded by: Office established

Personal details
- Education: University of Southampton

Paul Ovenden is a former British political adviser and political aide who served as Downing Street Head of Political Strategy from July 2024 to September 2025.

== Career ==
He completed a BA in history and English at the University of Southampton.

He was seen as part of the Blue Labour current in the Labour Party, and as being close to Morgan McSweeney.

He served as Head of Political Strategy in the Prime Minister's Office under Keir Starmer from July 2024 till September 2025 when he was forced to resign when it came to light that he had made sexually explicit and offensive remarks about Diane Abbott. ITV disclosed the content of the messages with names redacted.
