= Caroline Daniel =

British journalist, political commentator and editor

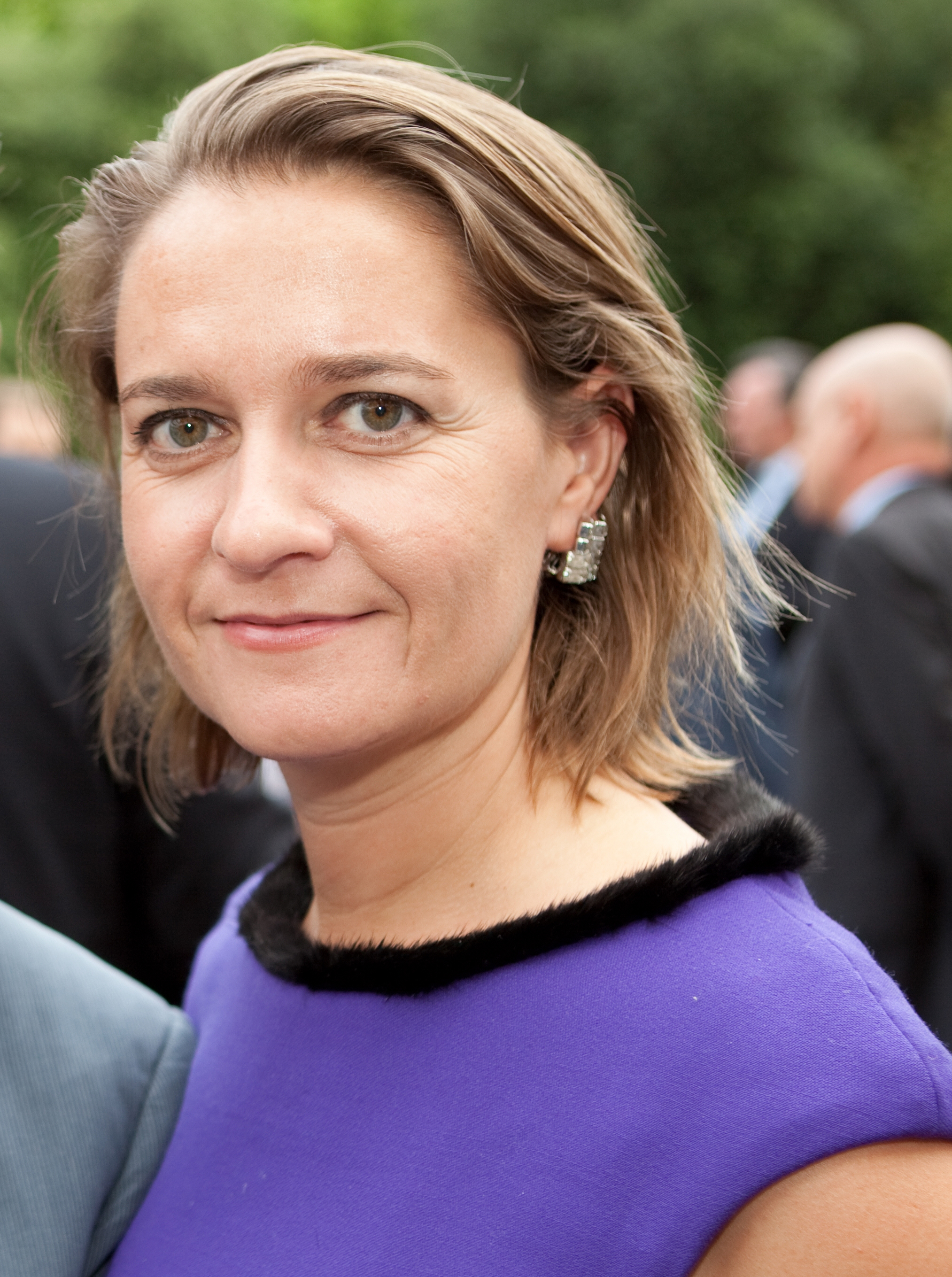
Caroline Daniel at Financial Times FT Summer Party 2011

Caroline Daniel is a British journalist, political commentator and former editor of FT Weekend. She was appointed in June 2010 after having spent three years running the Financial Times comment and analysis pages. In March 2014 she was made consulting editor of FT Live.

== Education and career ==
Daniel was educated at St. Helen's School in London and at Cambridge University, where she studied history. In 1998, Daniel won the Laurence Stern fellowship to The Washington Post. She joined the Financial Times in 1999. Before her appointment, she was a writer for the New Statesman and The Economist, and a researcher for Gordon Brown, the UK Chancellor of the Exchequer.

Between 2005 and 2007, she was the Financial Times' White House correspondent, based in Washington D. C., during which time she was a regular panellist on The McLaughlin Group and on National Public Radio’s Diane Rehm show. Before moving to Chicago in May 2002, where she led the FT's coverage of the US airline industry and Boeing, Daniel was based in London as Information Technology correspondent covering the IT boom and bust.

She was research editor for the book "Values, Visions and Voices" (1995) by Gordon Brown and Tony Wright and has had essays published by the IPPR and Demos.

She is a member of the Trilateral Commission, Trustee of the Institute for Public Policy Research and has a Financial Times Non-Executive Director Diploma.

Daniel joined the Brunswick Group as partner in 2016 specialising in media, technology and telecoms.

In 2019, she married actor Christopher Villiers.

As of 24 November 2025 she sits on the board for the East London social enterprise The Trampery as a non-executive director. She joined the board in July 2017.

== BBC ==
Daniel is a former editorial advisor to the BBC, her term ended on 14 July 2025. She is reported to have been suggested for an advisory position by ex-BBC chair Richard Sharp in 2021 when the BBC's leadership and editorial procedures were being reviewed after a scandal about Panorama's Diana, Princess of Wales interview in 1995.

On 24 November 2025 she answered questions from MPs during Parliament's Culture, Media and Sport Committee.
