= The Fall of the House of FIFA =

Book by David Conn

- Author: David Conn
- Publisher: Nation Books
- Publication date: 2018
- Pages: 336

The Fall of the House of FIFA: The Multimillion-Dollar Corruption at the Heart of Global Soccer is a forensics book by British investigative journalist David Conn. It was published by Nation Books in 2017.
