= Richard Brooks (journalist) =

Investigative financial journalist

- Born: 18 August 1965 (age 60)
- Occupations: Author; Investigative Journalist
- Known for: Investigative journalism

Richard Brooks (born 18 August 1965) is a British investigative journalist and former tax inspector. He writes principally for Private Eye, is the author of books on accountancy and tax avoidance, and was a 16-year senior corporate tax inspector for HMRC. He is the joint winner of two Paul Foot Awards, an annual award for investigative or campaigning journalism.

== Career ==
Brooks worked as a HM Revenue and Customs tax inspector for 16 years up until 2005 specialising in international and corporate taxation.

Since 2005, he has been a regular contributor to Private Eye. In 2008 Brooks was joint-winner of the Paul Foot Award for his investigation into the privatisation of the CDC Group. He is the author of The Great Tax Robbery: How Britain Became a Tax Haven for Fat Cats and Big Business (2013) and the co-author (with David Craig) of Plundering the Public Sector: How New Labour are letting consultants run off with £70 billion of our money (2006). With Andrew Bousfield, he was joint-winner again of the Paul Foot Award in 2014 for their investigations in Private Eye on bribery in Shady Arabia and the Desert Fix. In 2018 Brooks published a new book, Bean Counters: The Triumph of Accountants and how they broke Capitalism.

Richard Brooks is a digger and a troublemaker who niggles away at difficult subjects in a meticulous, punchy and highly effective way.

— Alan Rusbridger, Editor Guardian.

This is where Brooks comes into his own: not only does he have a near-encyclopedic knowledge of [tax] anomalies sanctioned by the state, he also has an ear for resonant detail.

— Jonathan Ford, Lead Writer Financial Times

Richard Brooks is an ex-HM Revenue & Customs (HMRC) tax inspector turned investigative journalist, regarded as one of the U.K.'s best reporters on tax avoidance.

— The International Tax Review

With Nick Wallis, he co-authored Private Eye's extensive report on the British Post Office scandal, "Justice Lost In The Post".

In January 2022, Brooks alongside Ian Hislop and Solomon Hughes presented evidence on MPs' conduct to the House of Commons' Standards Committee

== Bibliography ==
- Craig, David; Brooks, Richard (2006). Plundering the Public Sector: How New Labour are Letting Consultants run off with GBP70 billion of our Money. Constable. ISBN 978-1845293741.
- Brooks, Richard (2014). The Great Tax Robbery: How Britain Became a Tax Haven for Fat Cats and Big Business. One World. ISBN 978-1780743714.
- Brooks, Richard (2018). Bean Counters: The Triumph of Accountants and how they broke Capitalism. Atlantic Books. ISBN 978-1786490285.

== See also ==
- Corporate tax haven
- Base erosion and profit shifting
- Feargal O'Rourke
- Tax Justice Network
- Matheson (law firm)
- Ireland as a tax haven
