= Jill Cuthbertson =

British special adviser

Downing Street Chief of Staff
- Acting
- In office 8 February 2026 – 20 July 2026 Serving with Vidhya Alakeson
- Prime Minister: Keir Starmer
- Preceded by: Morgan McSweeney
- Succeeded by: James Purnell

Downing Street Deputy Chief of Staff
- In office 6 October 2024 – 20 July 2026 Serving with Vidhya Alakeson
- Prime Minister: Keir Starmer
- Succeeded by: Caroline Simpson

Personal details
- Education: University of Stirling

Jill Cuthbertson is a British political aide. She served as the acting Downing Street chief of staff alongside Vidhya Alakeson from February 2026 until July 2026, following the resignation of Morgan McSweeney. She previously served as the deputy chief of staff.

== Biography ==
Cuthbertson began work in politics in September 2005, working in the European parliament as a stagiaire. She then became a parliamentary researcher in the House of Commons from April 2006. From there, she began working for the Labour Party when she became the Office Manager to the General Secretary & General Election Coordinator.

When Gordon Brown became Prime Minister, she began working as the Political Office Manager for him, as well as his personal assistant. She continued in a similar role with Ed Miliband when he was leader of the Opposition. She worked for Cherie Blair. When Brown was prime minister she was manager of his Political Office. During the 2016 European Union membership referendum, she was events manager for the Britain Stronger in Europe campaign.

Until the 2024 United Kingdom general election, she was director of the private office of Keir Starmer. In the new Labour government she was appointed director of government relations. In October 2024, with the resignation of Sue Gray, she was promoted to deputy chief of staff by Morgan McSweeney.

On 8 February 2026, Cuthbertson was named joint acting Chief of Staff to the Prime Minister alongside Vidhya Alakeson, replacing McSweeney who had resigned following the Peter Mandelson-Jeffrey Epstein friendship scandal

== Personal life ==
Cuthbertson grew up in East Kilbride. She attended Claremont High School from 1994 to 2000, before going to the University of Stirling to study International Management Studies with French and Spanish language and culture.

She is married to Mo Hussein, a former special adviser to Home Secretary Amber Rudd. They met while working on the Remain campaign. They married in 2019.

Preceded by Morgan McSweeney	Downing Street Chief of Staff (jointly with Vidhya Alakeson); 2026	Succeeded by James Purnell
