= Laurence Stern fellowship =

Internship for UK journalist on Washington Post

The Stern-Bryan fellowship, previously the Laurence Stern fellowship, is an annual summer internship program for British journalists at The Washington Post. The internship was established in honour of Post journalist Laurence Stern, who was its assistant managing editor for national news when he died aged 50 in 1979. A fund for the program is managed by the National Press Foundation. Awardees are selected by the Post. Many program alumni have gone on to national prominence in British journalism. In 2020, the fellowship was renamed the Stern-Bryan fellowship in hour of Felicity Bryan, who started the scheme in 1980.

== Past winners ==
- 1980 - David Leigh
- 1981 - James Naughtie
- 1982 - Penny Chorlton
- 1983 - Ian Black
- 1984 - Mary Ann Sieghart, Financial Times
- 1985 - Lionel Barber, Financial Times
- 1986 - Ewen MacAskill, The Scotsman
- 1987 - Sarah Helm, The Independent
- 1988 - Ed Vulliamy, The Guardian
- 1989 - Adela Gooch, The Daily Telegraph
- 1990 - Keith Kendrick, The Birmingham Post
- 1991 - Liz Hunt, The Independent
- 1992 - Jonathan Freedland, BBC
- 1993 - Ian Katz, The Guardian
- 1994 - Rebecca Fowler, The Sunday Times
- 1995 - Sarah Neville, Yorkshire Post
- 1996 - Gary Younge, The Guardian
- 1997 - Audrey Gillan, The Guardian
- 1998 - Caroline Daniel, New Statesman
- 1999 - William Woodward, The Guardian
- 2000 - Cathy Newman, Financial Times
- 2001 - Glenda Cooper, Daily Mail
- 2002 - Helen Rumbelow, The Times
- 2003 - Tania Branigan, The Guardian
- 2004 - Mary Fitzgerald, The Belfast Telegraph
- 2005 - Sam Coates, The Times
- 2006 - Anushka Asthana, The Observer
- 2007 - Paul Lewis, The Guardian
- 2008 - Holly Watt, The Sunday Times
- 2009 - Alexi Mostrous, The Times
- 2010 - Michael Savage, The Independent
- 2011 - Shyamantha Asokan and Alice Fordham (joint winners)
- 2012 - James Ball, The Guardian
- 2013 - Billy Kenber, The Times
- 2014 - Sebastian Payne, The Spectator
- 2015 - Tom Rowley, The Telegraph
- 2016 - Louisa Loveluck
- 2017 - Murgia Madhumita, Financial Times
- 2018 - Gabriel Pogrund, The Sunday Times
- 2019 - Laura Hughes, Financial Times
