= Vidhya Alakeson =

British special adviser

Vidhya Alakeson OBE

Downing Street Chief of Staff
- Acting
- In office 8 February 2026 – 20 July 2026 Serving with Jill Cuthbertson
- Prime Minister: Keir Starmer
- Preceded by: Morgan McSweeney
- Succeeded by: James Purnell

Downing Street Deputy Chief of Staff
- In office 6 October 2024 – 20 July 2026 Serving with Jill Cuthbertson
- Prime Minister: Keir Starmer
- Succeeded by: Caroline Simpson

Personal details
- Born: 1976 (age 49)
- Education: University of Oxford; London School of Economics (MSc)

Vidhya Alakeson OBE (born 1976) is a British political aide who served as the acting Downing Street Chief of Staff alongside Jill Cuthbertson from February 2026 until July 2026, following the resignation of Morgan McSweeney. She also served as Deputy Chief of Staff in the Starmer ministry.

== Biography ==
Vidhya Alakeson is of British Sri Lankan background. She holds a degree in modern languages from the University of Oxford and an MSc from the London School of Economics. Alakeson worked at the United States Department of Health and Human Services in Washington D.C. from 2006-2010. Alakeson joined the Resolution Foundation in January 2011, where she became deputy chief executive, and left in January 2014 to become Chief Executive of Power to Change. When Keir Starmer was Leader of the Opposition, she was political director. In this role she worked as a special adviser.

In the 2021 Birthday Honours, Alakeson was awarded an Officer of the Order of the British Empire (OBE) for services to social equality. Until the 2024 United Kingdom general election, she was director of external relations for the Labour Party. In October 2024, with the resignation of Sue Gray, she was promoted to deputy chief of staff by Morgan McSweeney. She served alongside Jill Cuthbertson.

On 8 February 2026, Alakeson was named joint acting Chief of Staff to the Prime Minister alongside Jill Cuthbertson, replacing McSweeney who had resigned following the Mandelson-Epstein scandal.

Preceded by Morgan McSweeney	Downing Street Chief of Staff (jointly with Jill Cuthbertson); 2026	Succeeded by James Purnell
