= Leigh Lewis =

Sir Leigh Warren Lewis KCB (born 1951) is a retired senior British civil servant, who served as the Permanent Secretary for the British Department for Work and Pensions from 2006 to 2011.

Having graduated in Hispanic studies from Liverpool University, Lewis joined the then Department of Employment as an Administration Trainee in September 1973. He became Director of Operations for the Unemployment Benefit Service in 1986.

On returning to the Department of Employment in 1991, he became Director of the International Division and later, in 1994, Director of Finance. He retained that post when the Department for Education and the Employment Department Group merged in July 1995.

Lewis was appointed as Chief Executive of the Employment Service following an open competition in January 1997. In January 2001 he was appointed Chief Executive of Jobcentre Plus, a new business of the Department for Work and Pensions. From April 2002 Jobcentre Plus brought together the Employment Service and those parts of the Benefits Agency which deal with customers of working age, into a single work focused organisation.

In February 2003 Lewis was appointed to the Home Office as Permanent Secretary for Crime, Policing, Counter-Terrorism and Delivery, but subsequently returned to DWP as Permanent Secretary to DWP in late 2005 until his retirement in 2011. Upon which, he was installed as the new chair of the Coalition Government's Commission on a UK Bill of Rights.

Lewis is the Chair of the London-based Homeless charity St Mungo's.

Government offices
Preceded by Mike Fogden	Chief Executive; Employment Service at the Department for Education and Employment; 1997-2001	Succeeded by Himself as Chief Executive, Job Centre Plus, DWP
Preceded by Himself as Chief Executive, Employment Service, DfEE	Chief Executive; Jobcentre Plus at the Department for Work and Pensions; 2001-2003	Succeeded by Lesley Strathie
Preceded by John Lyon as Director-General, Policing and Crime Reduction Group	Second Permanent Secretary, Crime &c., of the Home Office; 2003-2005	Succeeded by Moira Wallace as Director-General, Crime, Policing and Counter Terrorism Group
Preceded by Sir Richard Mottram	Permanent Secretary of the Department for Work and Pensions; 2006-2011	Succeeded by Robert Devereux
