= Sam Coates =

British journalist (born 1978)

- Born: Samuel Coates; 22 April 1978 (age 48)
- Education: King's College School; Magdalene College, Cambridge
- Occupation: Journalist
- Years active: 2000–present
- Employer(s): The Times (2000–2019); Sky News (2019–present)
- Title: Deputy Political Editor, Sky News

Sam Coates (born 22 April 1978) is a British journalist. He has worked for Sky News since 2019 as their Deputy Political Editor. Coates previously worked as a newspaper journalist for The Times from 2000 until 2019.

== Early life and education ==
Coates attended King's College School, a private day school in Wimbledon, London until 1996. Coates read English and Social and Political Sciences at Magdalene College, Cambridge, graduating in 2000.

== Career ==
=== The Times ===
Coates joined The Times in 2000 as a graduate trainee, working on the diary, foreign desk, and general reporter. He won the Laurence Stern fellowship in 2005, and worked at The Washington Post during summer 2005. Coates joined The Times' lobby team in 2005 as Chief Political Correspondent, before being promoted to Deputy Political Editor in November 2010. In 2012, Coates spent a year as banking editor of The Times.

During his time working at The Times, he contributed to the 2010 The Times Guide to the House of Commons, and his picture of the 2017 Westminster attack was used on the front cover of the newspaper. His reaction to Boris Johnson ruling himself out in the 2016 Conservative Party leadership election led to Coates featuring in the Daily Mirror and other outlets. Coates was said to be "pivotal to The Times' parliamentary coverage" in a 2019 report.

While at The Times, Coates regularly presented BBC Radio 4's Week in Westminster. Coates also appeared as a paper reviewer on BBC One's The Andrew Marr Show, Politics Live, and appeared on ABC's Lateline programme in March 2012. He also appeared on ABC's Insiders programme on 2 May 2010 alongside future Sky News colleague Adam Boulton.

=== Sky News ===
In February 2019, it was announced that Coates would be joining Sky News later that year as deputy political editor, replacing Beth Rigby who was promoted to political editor. Coates obtained a leaked document regarding the impact of a no-deal Brexit which featured widely in news outlets in the UK and Ireland.

In the build-up to Britain's proposed exit from the European Union on the 31 October 2019, Coates participated in Sky News' #Brexplainer feature, and featured in Sky News' 2019 general election overnight coverage.

In September 2023 Politico and Sky News launched a new podcast series, Politics at Jack and Sam’s, which featured Coates and Jack Blanchard presenting weekly podcast giving a look ahead to the coming week but soon moved to a typically 4 days a week 20 minute podcast. On Blanchard’s move to a new post in America the podcast was relaunched in March 2025 with Politico’s Anne McElvoy.

== Selected bibliography ==
- Coates, Sam (11 June 2012). "Eight out of ten Britons want a vote on Europe". The Times.
- Zeffman, Henry; Coates, Sam (2 August 2018). "Jeremy Corbyn raised Nazi crimes to describe Israel in Gaza". The Times.
- Coates, Sam; Walsh, John (7 December 2018). "Warning of food shortages in Ireland". The Times.
- Coates, Sam (2 August 2019). "UK faces potential 'consumer panic' and 'security gaps' under no-deal Brexit, says government document". Sky News.
- Coates, Sam (30 September 2019). "Brexit is 'unsettling' the civil service, cabinet sec admits in leaked letter". Sky News.

Media offices
Preceded by Beth Rigby	Deputy Political Editor of Sky News; 2019–present	Incumbent
