= David Rowlands (civil servant) =

Sir David Rowlands KCB (31 May 1947 – 11 May 2014) was a British civil servant who rose to the rank of Permanent Secretary to the Department for Transport.

Rowlands left the private sector to join the Department of Trade and Industry in 1974. At the DTI he was appointed private secretary to the Minister of State for Industry.

He moved to the then Ministry of Transport in 1983 where he has held a number of posts with responsibilities for finance, aviation, shipping, ports and railways. Before being appointed Permanent Secretary in May 2003, he was the director general for railways, aviation, logistics, maritime and security.

In this role he was central to the creation of Network Rail after Railtrack was put into administration and the delivery of public-private partnerships for the London Underground and the National Air Traffic Services. Rowlands received a knighthood in the Birthday Honours List 2006. He retired at 60.

Since leaving the civil service his career moves were subject to a number of controversies, including government blocks on his attempts to join the Boards of British Airports Authority and Bechtel. At the time of his death his roles in the private sector included chairmanships of Gatwick Airport and Angel Trains. He was also the chairman of High Speed 2 Ltd,.
