= Excalibur (database) =

Database used by the British Labour Party

Excalibur was a database used by the British Labour Party for campaigning. It was created as a rapid rebuttal tool. Said to have cost £300,000, and to have cost £250,000 per year to run with a staff of 10 running it at its peak, it was used during Labour's successful 1997 general election campaign.

According to reports, it contained information on party and opposition policies, party members, opponents and journalists.

A 1999 Labour government initiative, the Knowledge Network Project, was criticised for being too close to Excalibur in concept, with the worry that it could be used for party political purposes.
