= Robert Devereux (civil servant) =

Retired British civil servant

Sir Robert Devereux KCB
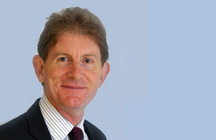

Permanent Secretary for the Department for Work and Pensions
- In office 2011–2018
- Minister: Iain Duncan Smith; Stephen Crabb; Damian Green; David Gauke; Esther McVey
- Preceded by: Sir Leigh Lewis
- Succeeded by: Peter Schofield

Permanent Secretary for the Department for Transport
- In office 2007–2011
- Minister: Douglas Alexander; Ruth Kelly; Geoff Hoon; The Lord Adonis; Philip Hammond
- Preceded by: Sir David Rowlands
- Succeeded by: Dame Lin Homer

Personal details
- Born: Robert John Devereux; 15 January 1957 (age 69)

Sir Robert John Devereux, KCB (/ˈdɛvəˌruː/; born 15 January 1957) is a retired senior British civil servant, who served as Permanent Secretary for the Department for Transport from 2007 to 2011, and oversaw a new policy, increasing the UK retirement age to 67, at the Department for Work and Pensions, from 2011 until his retirement, at 61, in January 2018.

== Education ==
Devereux was educated at St John's College, Oxford between 1975 and 1978, before studying for a master's degree at the University of Edinburgh.

== Career ==
Devereux joined the Civil Service in 1979; until 1983, he worked in the Overseas Development Administration, before working at HM Treasury until 1994. He was with the Department of Social Security between 1996 and 2001. From 2007 to 2011, Devereux was Permanent Secretary at the Department for Transport. He became Permanent Secretary at the Department for Work and Pensions (DWP) on 1 January 2011. As of 2015, Devereux was paid a salary of between £180,000 and £184,999 by the department.

In 2013, it was reported that the Cabinet Secretary, Sir Jeremy Heywood, informed the Prime Minister David Cameron that he was concerned about the "concerted political briefing campaign" against Devereux over failures in the DWP's Universal Credit programme.

On 11 October 2017, it was announced that Sir Robert would retire from his post on his 61st birthday. He was succeeded by Peter Schofield, at that point the department's Director-General for Finance, in January 2018.

In April 2025, Devereux was put in charge of an independent review of the culture and operation of the Office of National Statistics. The review concluded in June 2025 finding "deep seated" issues in the organisation.

== Honours ==
Devereux was appointed Knight Commander of the Order of the Bath (KCB) in the 2016 New Year Honours for services to transport and welfare and for voluntary service in Kilburn, London.

Government offices
Preceded by Sir David Rowlands	Permanent Secretary of the Department for Transport; 2007–2011	Succeeded by Dame Lin Homer
Preceded by Sir Leigh Lewis	Permanent Secretary of the Department for Work and Pensions; 2011–2018	Succeeded by Peter Schofield
