= Solomon Hughes (journalist) =

UK investigative journalist

- Occupations: Author; Investigative Journalist
- Known for: Investigative journalism, Private Eye

Solomon Hughes is a freelance investigative journalist working in the United Kingdom. Many of his pieces focus on corporate influence on politicians. His work has appeared regularly in Private Eye since around 2000. Hughes has contributed to The Observer, The Independent, Morning Star, Vice, and The Guardian.

In 2008, Hughes's book War on Terror, Inc: Corporate Profiteering from the Politics of Fear was published by Verso. A political fiction book Oliver's Army was published in 2014.

Hughes was barred from covering the DSEI arms fair in 2019.

In January 2022, Hughes alongside fellow Private Eye journalist Richard Brooks and editor Ian Hislop presented evidence on MPs' conduct to the House of Commons' Standards Committee
