= Remploy =

British employment service for disabled people

Remploy Limited
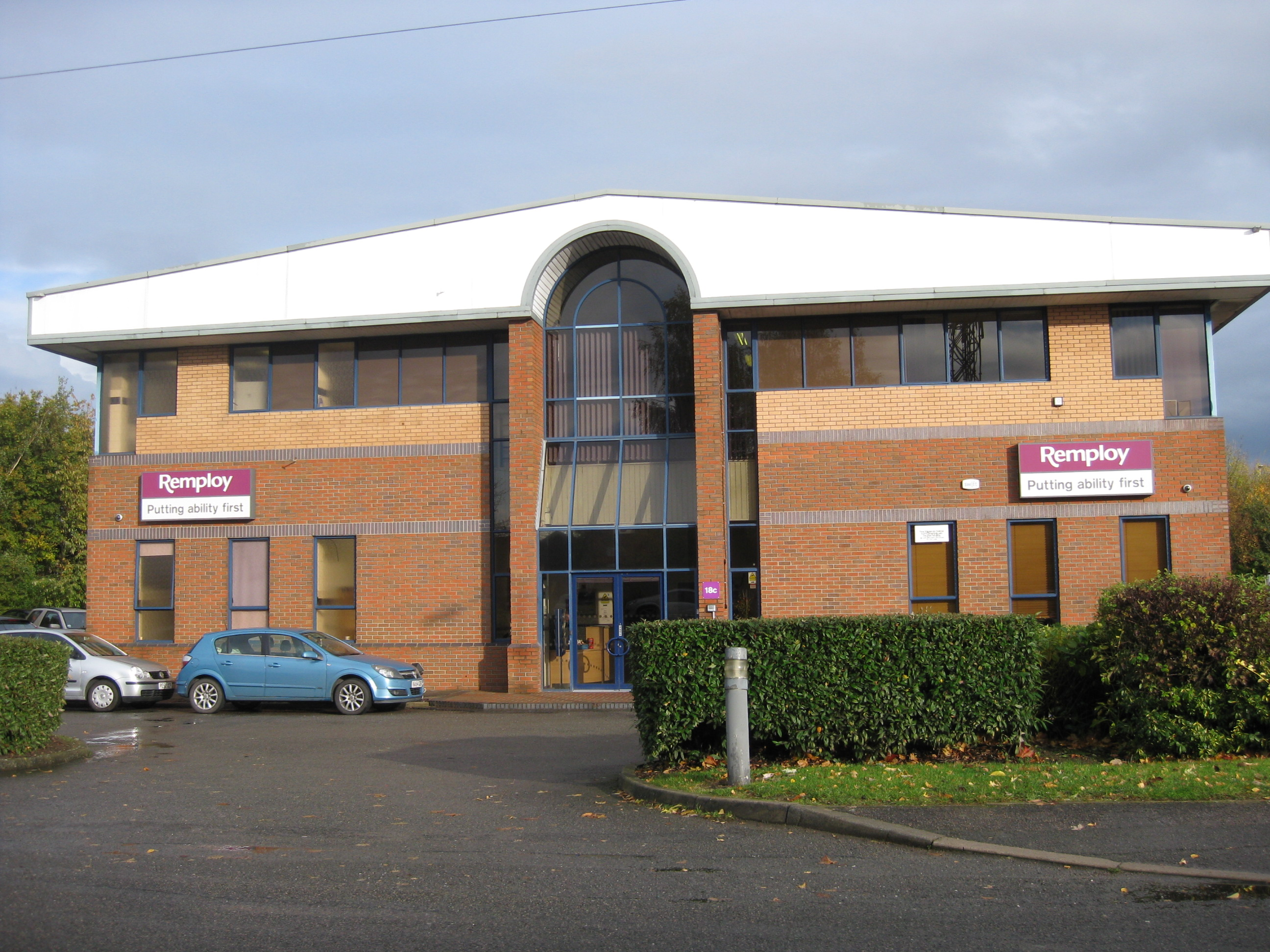
- Remploy Head Office
- Formation: 1945
- Type: Disability organisation
- Legal status: Dissolved
- Location: 18c Meridian East, Meridian Business Park, Leicester, LE19 1WZ, UK
- Official language: English
- Chief Executive: Gareth Parry
- Website: www.remploy.co.uk

Remploy was an organisation in the United Kingdom which initially provided direct employment, and then later also employment placement services, for disabled people.

From 1946, Remploy directly employed disabled people in a number of factories owned by the company itself and subsidised by the UK government, before these were phased out between 2008 and 2013.

From 2006, Remploy's employment services business supported disadvantaged people into work, and was a major welfare-to-work provider, delivering a range of contracts and employment programmes for people with substantial barriers to work. Between 2009 and 2014, it found 100,000 jobs for disabled people. In 2015, the service became controlled by Maximus, who continued to use Remploy as a trading name until 2026.

== History ==
=== Enterprise business and factories ===
Remploy was originally established under the terms of the Disabled Persons (Employment) Act 1944, to directly employ disabled persons in specialised factories. It opened its first factory in Bridgend, Wales, in 1946. Over the following decades it established a network of 83 factories across the UK making a wide variety of products. These were organised into a number of sub-businesses, such as Remploy e-cycle, which dealt with the safe disposal and recycling of electrical appliances.

In the late 20th century it also moved into service businesses, such as monitoring CCTV images.

To further subsidise Remploy businesses, the government made regulations, in 2006, stating that every public body should reserve at least one contract for 'supported businesses' (those where over 50% of employees are disabled); in this way, public bodies could fulfil corporate social responsibility objectives. These Public Contracts Regulations (specifically, Regulation 7) restrict the tendering process for goods or services to 'supported businesses'.

=== Employment advice and support services ===
In the later years of the Blair ministry, at the start of the 21st century, Remploy underwent a major change to its operation, and branched out into providing general employment assistance for disabled people, and others with barriers to employment. After the closure of most Remploy factories, the provision of these assistance services became Remploy's principal purpose.

In 2006, Remploy Employment Services opened its first high-street branch in Newhall Street, Birmingham; since that date a further forty branches and thirty offices have opened from Glasgow to Plymouth, often in the same general location as their former factory sites. The five-year project to develop Remploy as a high-street brand allowed the business to support its vision of assisting over 10,000 disabled customers into mainstream employment, a target achieved in the financial year of 2009–10.

In 2009 Remploy was selected as a prime- and sub-contractor to deliver the then government's 'Flexible New Deal' contract, which aimed to help the long-term unemployed back into work. After the change in government, a year later, it became a sub-contractor in the Coalition government's Work Programme.

In 2009/10 Remploy placed over 10,500 people into jobs across a range of sectors.

In March 2010, Remploy went mobile: two thirty-foot mobile 'jobs mobiles' were rolled out in the High Peaks and South Yorkshire to support the FND programme. The mobile units have provided support to disabled customers in the most hard-to-reach geographical areas where access to public transport is limited.

=== Factory closures ===
In 2007, Remploy management announced proposals to close 42 Remploy factories; this was later reduced to 28 after heated debates at the TUC and Labour conferences, with then-Work and Pensions minister Peter Hain requiring proposed factory closures to have ministerial approval. Eventually, 29 factories were closed in 2008.

In December 2010, the Coalition government commissioned a review of the government's special employment programmes for disabled people. The review was carried out by Liz Sayce, the head of RADAR, the largest disability campaigning organisation in the country, and was published in early 2012. The review concluded that there would inevitably be people who failed to benefit from whatever the government did, but that the best use of government money would be to concentrate on getting disabled people into mainstream work, rather than subsidising disabled-only factories.

The Coalition government announced that it would generally accept the report, and consequently would withdraw its subsidy to Remploy factories. This led to Remploy's proposing to immediately close the 36 least financially viable factories, among its 54 remaining factories, potentially making 1,700 workers redundant. Ex-employees were advised to apply for Access to Work, with the goal of finding employment in mainstream workplace.

Thirty-three factories were eventually closed in 2012, with the loss of 1,752 jobs. Of these, one – Bristol – was the subject of a viable bid (from The Rehab Group), but the bidder subsequently withdrew. An additional factory, among the 36 that had been threatened with immediate closure, was sold to Nationwide Filters Company Ltd; the factory, based in Barrow-in-Furness, had manufactured air filters.

The future of the remaining 20 sites remained unclear, but in December 2012 ministers said some would close, while others might become independent businesses without government funding. The fate of these 20 remaining sites were as follows:

Business	Sites	Outcome	Date announced
Healthcare	Chesterfield and Springburn	Sold to R Link Ltd, trading as R Healthcare, who closed the Springburn factory shortly afterwards	20 December 2012
Automotive Textiles	Huddersfield	Closed - no viable bids	30 April 2013
Frontline Textiles	Dundee, Stirling and Clydebank	Closed - no viable bids	4 July 2013
Marine Textiles	Leven and Cowdenbeath	Closed - no viable bids	4 July 2013
Packaging	Burnley, Norwich, Portsmouth and Sunderland	Closed - no viable bids	4 July 2013
Furniture	Blackburn, Neath (Port Talbot) and Sheffield	Closed - Swansea Factory now run by Accommodation Furniture Solutions Limited (Cooperative of former Remploy employees)	26 February 2013
e-Cycle	Porth and Heywood	Sold to E-Cycle Ltd, a management buyout	16 September 2013
Automotive	Coventry, Birmingham and Derby	Sold to Rempower Ltd, a member of Arlington Industries Group	13 December 2013

In addition, the Cook with Care business, based in Liverpool, was spun off into a Social Enterprise. Also the CCTV image monitoring business was sold to Enigma CCTV Ltd, a subsidiary of Enigma Security Solutions Ltd, on 17 December 2013.

=== Privatisation ===
In July 2014, the Department for Work and Pensions (DWP) announced that it was looking for Remploy Employment Services to leave government control, by way of a joint venture between a private company and Remploy's employees. In March 2015, it was confirmed the business would become owned by US service provider Maximus (70%) and an employee trust (30%). The transfer of ownership was completed on 7 April 2015.

In January 2018, the employee trust elected to sell 10% of the joint venture to Maximus, and in September 2019, the trust agreed to Maximus acquiring the remaining 20%. In April 2020, Remploy Employment Services was absorbed into Maximus, with Remploy continuing to be used as a trading name. Maximus subsequently phased out the Remploy name in England and Wales in September 2022, and in Scotland in March 2026.

=== Dissolution ===
On 9 April 2015, the residual Remploy company was renamed Disabled People's Employment Corporation (GB) Ltd while it was wound down, before being dissolved on 3 June 2024.
