= James Purnell =

British executive and former politician

The Right Honourable James Purnell
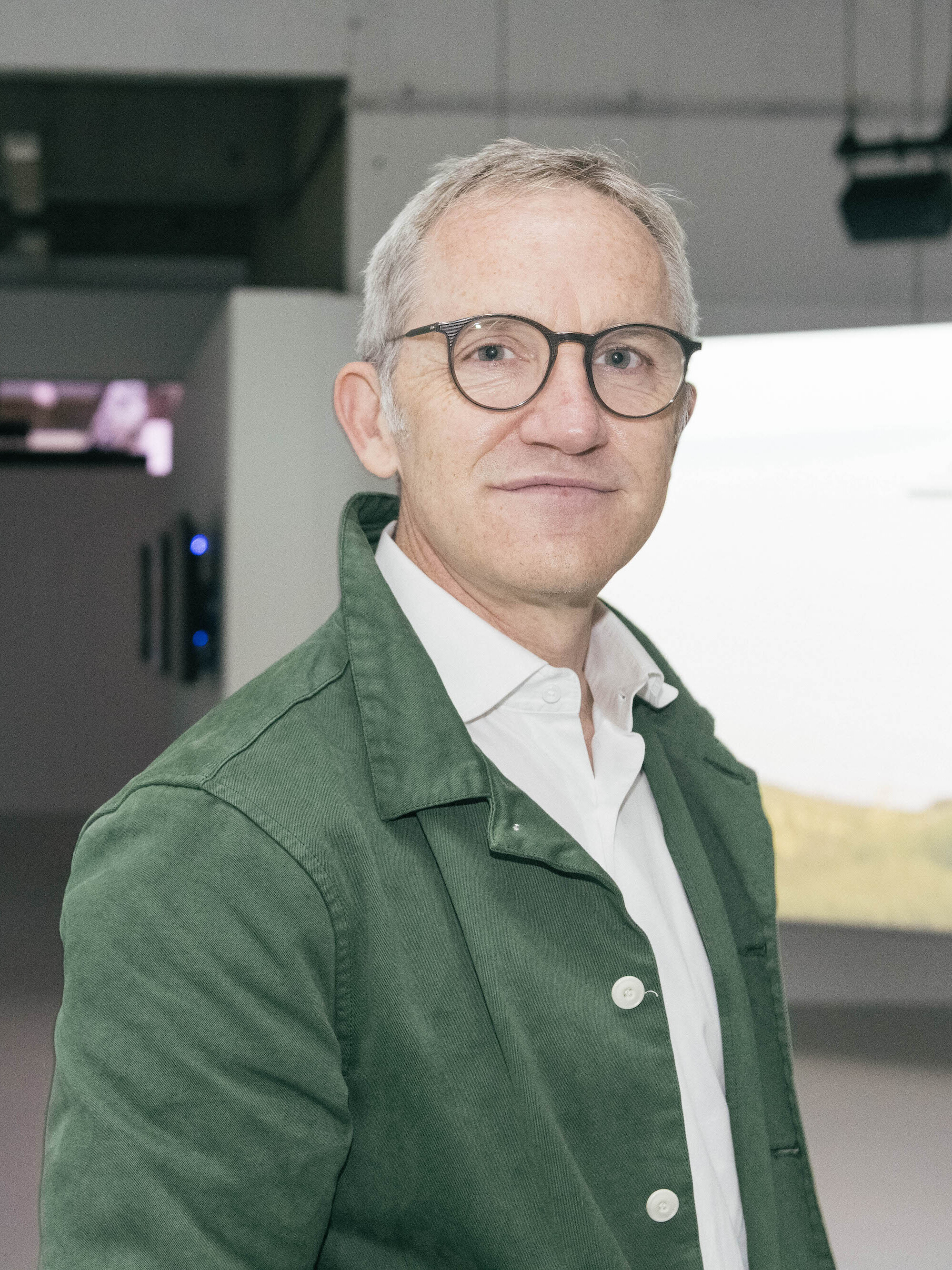
- Purnell in 2021

Downing Street Chief of Staff
- Incumbent
- Assumed office 20 July 2026
- Prime Minister: Andy Burnham
- Deputy: Alison Phillips
- Preceded by: Vidhya Alakeson; Jill Cuthbertson

Secretary of State for Work and Pensions
- In office 24 January 2008 – 4 June 2009
- Prime Minister: Gordon Brown
- Preceded by: Peter Hain
- Succeeded by: Yvette Cooper

Secretary of State for Culture, Media and Sport
- In office 28 June 2007 – 24 January 2008
- Prime Minister: Gordon Brown
- Preceded by: Tessa Jowell
- Succeeded by: Andy Burnham

Minister of State for Pensions
- In office 5 May 2006 – 28 June 2007
- Prime Minister: Tony Blair
- Preceded by: Stephen Timms
- Succeeded by: Mike O'Brien

Member of Parliament for Stalybridge and Hyde
- In office 7 June 2001 – 12 April 2010
- Preceded by: Tom Pendry
- Succeeded by: Jonathan Reynolds

Islington Borough Councillor for Canonbury East Ward
- In office 5 May 1994 – 12 October 1995
- Succeeded by: Terence Herbert

Personal details
- Born: 2 March 1970 (age 56) London, England
- Party: None
- Other political affiliations: Labour (until 2013)
- Education: Balliol College, Oxford (BA)

James Mark Dakin Purnell (born 2 March 1970) is a British politician who has served as Downing Street Chief of Staff since July 2026. A former member of the Labour Party, he previously served as the Member of Parliament for Stalybridge and Hyde from 2001 to 2010, during which time he served as Secretary of State for Culture, Media and Sport from 2007 to 2008 and Secretary of State for Work and Pensions from 2008 to 2009. He resigned from the Government on 4 June 2009, criticising the leadership of prime minister Gordon Brown.

After leaving parliament, Purnell was chair of the Institute for Public Policy Research from 2010 to 2012 before joining the BBC as Director of Strategy and Digital from 2013 to 2016 and Director of Radio and Education from 2016 to 2020. In 2020 he was appointed vice-chancellor of University of the Arts London; he left this post in 2024 to become CEO of Flint Global, a British international advisory business.

== Early life ==
Purnell was born in London, brought up in France, and then studied for his A-Levels at the fee-paying Royal Grammar School, Guildford, subsequently studying Philosophy, Politics and Economics at Balliol College, Oxford. During his time as a student he worked during summer vacations between 1989 and 1992 as a researcher for Tony Blair. After graduating, he worked as a researcher at the Institute for Public Policy Research before moving to the BBC to become its Head of Corporate Planning.

Between May 1994 and October 1995, he was a Labour Party councillor on Islington London Borough Council, representing Canonbury East ward. In 1997, Purnell returned to work as a special adviser at 10 Downing Street, remaining in the post until 2001. He has also served as a consultant at Hydra Associates and as a board member of the Young Vic theatre as well as of the Royal National Theatre and the British Film Institute, and as a senior advisor to Boston Consulting Group.

== Member of Parliament ==
Purnell was selected as the Labour candidate for the constituency of Stalybridge and Hyde in 2001, and won the seat at that year's general election with a majority of 8,859. While a Labour MP, he was a member of the Work and Pensions Select Committee in the House of Commons from 2001 to 2003, the Chair of the All-Party Group on Private Equity and Venture Capital between 2002 and 2003, and the Chair of Labour Friends of Israel from 2002 to 2004.

=== In government ===
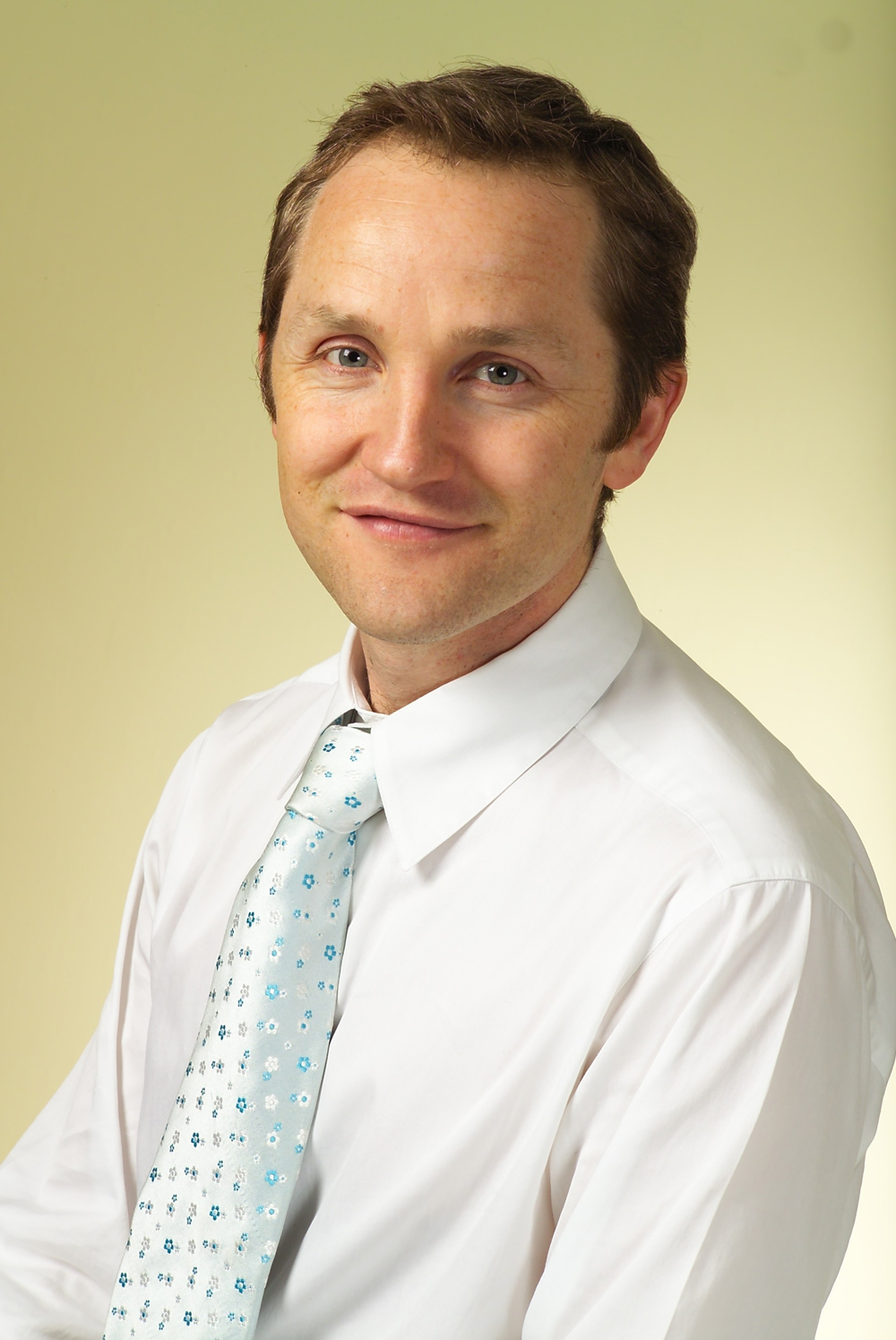
Purnell in 2009

In 2003, Purnell became Parliamentary private secretary (PPS) to Ruth Kelly in the Cabinet Office, and in December 2004 he joined the Government as a Whip in the government reshuffle following the resignation of David Blunkett.

After Labour was returned to power at the 2005 general election, he was appointed to the position of Parliamentary under-secretary of state for Creative Industries and Tourism in the Department for Culture, Media and Sport, where he was in charge of preparing the legislation that liberalised the alcohol licensing laws of England and Wales and created tax breaks for the film industry. In May 2006, he was promoted to be Minister of State for Pensions in the Department for Work and Pensions, replacing Stephen Timms.

In 2007, he was named Consumer Champion of the Year by Which? magazine for his work on pensions. Which? cited his "commitment to consumers in the development of the national pensions saving scheme", particularly for listening to stakeholders and for his contributions to the personal accounts for low and middle earners.

In June 2007, Purnell entered the Cabinet as the Secretary of State for Culture, Media and Sport; he was its youngest member. He was promoted to Work and Pensions Secretary after the resignation of Peter Hain on 24 January 2008.

In September 2007, a Tameside General Hospital press release for a PFI deal in September 2007 included a photograph with an image of Purnell digitally inserted, which Purnell denied having agreed to. In December 2008, Purnell proposed charging interest on crisis loans to the unemployed and pensioners made by the Department for Work and Pensions, which were interest-free, at a rate of up to 26.8% per annum. This was met with great hostility and was blocked by the intervention of Gordon Brown.

During the 2009 parliamentary expenses scandal led by The Daily Telegraph, Purnell received public scrutiny regarding his "second home" arrangements and capital gains tax, however he was not found to have breached any rules and was not required to repay any monies.

=== Resignation from the Cabinet ===
On 4 June 2009, Purnell announced his resignation from the Cabinet, and called upon Gordon Brown to resign as Prime Minister. His resignation came only days after the resignations of Home Secretary Jacqui Smith, whose expenses had been the subject of negative comments, and Communities Secretary Hazel Blears, who had also avoided paying capital gains tax on her property. The news came just minutes after polls closed in the local and European elections, in which Labour performed badly. His letter to the Prime Minister, which was also sent to The Sun and The Times, the latter printing the letter in full on the front page.

During 2010, Purnell was working on a project with Demos. He did not seek re-election as an MP at the 2010 general election held in May 2010.

== Post-parliamentary career ==
After leaving parliament, Purnell became the chair of the Institute for Public Policy Research. It was touted that he would stand for the Labour candidacy to become Mayor of London, but he decided against this option. He supported David Miliband in the 2010 Labour leadership election and worked for his campaign, although he was subsequently offered the job of chief of staff to the new leader of the Labour Party, Ed Miliband, a job he turned down.

Purnell became linked with the Blue Labour movement within the Labour Party and in April 2011 he was appointed by the Boston Consulting Group as a Special Advisor to their Public Sector Group. In July 2011, he appeared on Newsnight with proposals for welfare reforms, as part of his involvement in Blue Labour. He called for a National Salary Insurance, a job guarantee and free universal childcare, but also said that "freebies" such as Winter Fuel Allowance and free bus passes should not become sacred. He did not rule out returning to Parliament in 2015, but declared his support for Ed Miliband and his leadership.

Purnell was also a film producer at Rare Day, who produced the documentary film One Mile Away in 2013.

=== BBC career ===
In February 2013 Purnell left the IPPR in order to rejoin the BBC as its Director of Strategy. As a senior BBC employee he had to resign his membership of the Labour Party.

An Employment Tribunal for unfair dismissal was brought by the BBC's former Chief Technology Officer, John Linwood, when he lost his job in 2013 after the corporation's £100m Digital Media Initiative failed. During the case an email from Purnell was cited in evidence, which read: "We need a clear line on [John Linwood] on whether he is resigning or being fired and why". The tribunal's response to this was: "It was notable that there was no third option in Purnell's mind, such as a different disciplinary outcome." The tribunal found the BBC's processes to have given an "apparently cavalier disregard for any of the accepted norms of a fair disciplinary process", and that there was a "deeply ingrained cultural expectation within the organisation of sacrificial accountability". Linwood was awarded £80,000 in damages, and it was later revealed that the BBC had spent £498,000 defending the claim.

In late September 2016, Purnell was appointed as the BBC's Director of Radio and Education, in succession to Helen Boaden. He took up his new position in late October 2016. The Daily Telegraph described a key facet of his role as attracting younger listeners and viewers to the BBC. In September 2020 the new director-general Tim Davie removed Purnell from his new smaller executive board.

=== Later career ===
Purnell left the BBC in 2020 to become president and vice-chancellor of University of the Arts London in spring 2021. He left UAL in 2024 and was appointed as CEO of Flint Global, an advisory and lobbying firm with clients including Uber, Apple and BP.

=== Downing Street Chief of Staff ===
In June 2026, it was reported that Andy Burnham was planning to appoint Purnell as his chief of staff should he become Prime Minister. On 24 June, Purnell had told staff at Flint Global that he was leaving to take the Chief of Staff role, making the appointment much more definite. On 20 July 2026, he was officially appointed as Chief of Staff to the Prime Minister.

== Personal life ==
As of 2015 he was engaged and expecting a child.

Parliament of the United Kingdom
| Preceded by Tom Pendry | Member of Parliament for Stalybridge and Hyde; 2001–2010 | Succeeded by Jonathan Reynolds |
Political offices
| Preceded by Tessa Jowell | Secretary of State for Culture, Media and Sport; 2007–2008 | Succeeded by Andy Burnham |
| Preceded by Peter Hain | Secretary of State for Work and Pensions; 2008–2009 | Succeeded by Yvette Cooper |
| Preceded by Vidhya Alakeson and Jill Cuthbertson | Downing Street Chief of Staff; 2026–present | Succeeded by Incumbent |
