= James Ball (journalist) =

British journalist and author

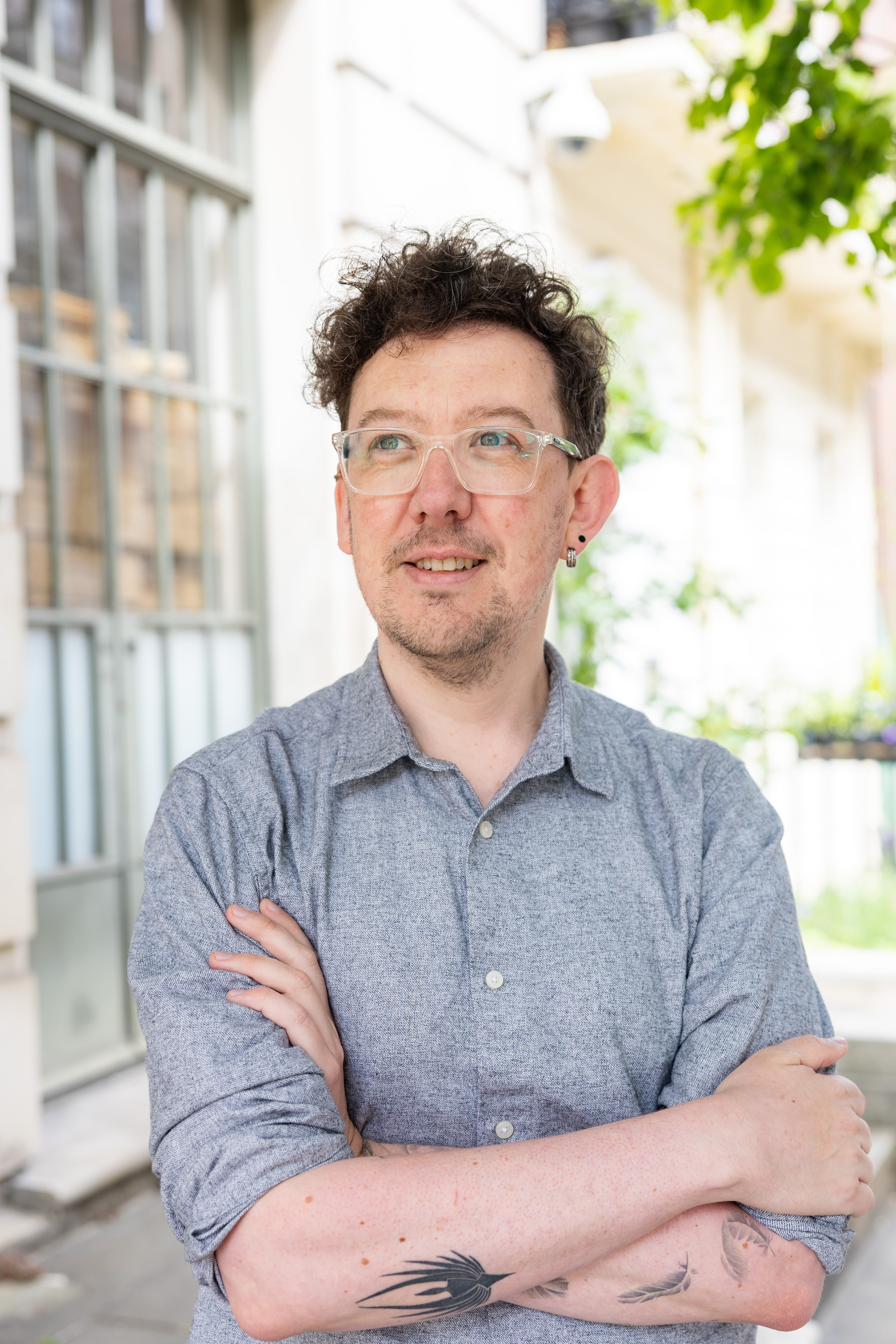
- James Ball, London, 7 May 2025
- Education: University of Oxford; City, University of London
- Occupations: Journalist, author
- Years active: 2008–present
- Website: jamesrball.com

James Ball is a British journalist and author. He has worked for The Grocer, The Guardian, WikiLeaks, BuzzFeed, The New European and The Washington Post and is the author of several books. He is the recipient of several awards for journalism and was a member of The Guardian team that won the Pulitzer Prize for investigative journalism.

== Early life ==
Ball studied for a BA degree in Philosophy, Politics and Economics at the University of Oxford and went on to enrol in the master's programme in journalism at City, University of London. After transferring to a diploma course for financial reasons, he graduated from City in 2008 with a diploma in magazine journalism with a focus on investigative journalism.

== Career ==
After leaving university he spent two years at The Grocer before moving to the Bureau of Investigative Journalism where he worked on iraqwarlogs.com. In November 2010, Julian Assange invited him to work as the in-house journalist for WikiLeaks in the UK, where he began working on the Iraq War documents leak. He said that the hours there were "long and erratic", complicated when a European Arrest Warrant was issued for Assange which led to extradition proceedings known as the Assange v Swedish Prosecution Authority. He described the backlash against WikiLeaks as "in some ways quite scary. ... Seeing Amazon, PayPal, Visa and Mastercard turn on you, at the same time as US congressmen and senators are calling for you to be branded as a terrorist, is an experience, to say the least". Ball later criticised Assange and the WikiLeaks organisation and stated that his journalistic duty of care was to the source, Chelsea Manning, rather than the organisation reporting on it. Ball left WikiLeaks after three months because of concerns regarding protecting the identity of vulnerable individuals in the leaked cables and Assange's attempts to secure WikiLeaks' funds for his own legal defence. In 2012 he co-authored a book with Charlie Beckett documenting his experiences, WikiLeaks: News in the Networked Era.

In 2011 Ball joined British newspaper The Guardian where he worked on several high-profile investigative stories. He was part of The Guardian team which received several awards for its study Reading the Riots about the 2011 England riots. Whilst working for The Guardian, Ball collaborated on the "Offshore Leaks" project which won multiple awards from Investigative Reporters and Editors as well as the George Polk Award in 2014. In 2013 he was appointed data editor and from around June 2013 he worked on the Edward Snowden leaked documents on British and US intelligence organisations Government Communications Headquarters and National Security Agency. In October 2013 it was announced that Ball had joined Guardian US, the American online section of the newspaper where he took up the newly created position of special projects editor.

Prior to working for The Guardian, Ball worked on British investigative current affairs programmes Dispatches for Channel 4 and Panorama for BBC Television. Whilst with the Bureau of Investigative Journalism he also worked for Al Jazeera and ITN.

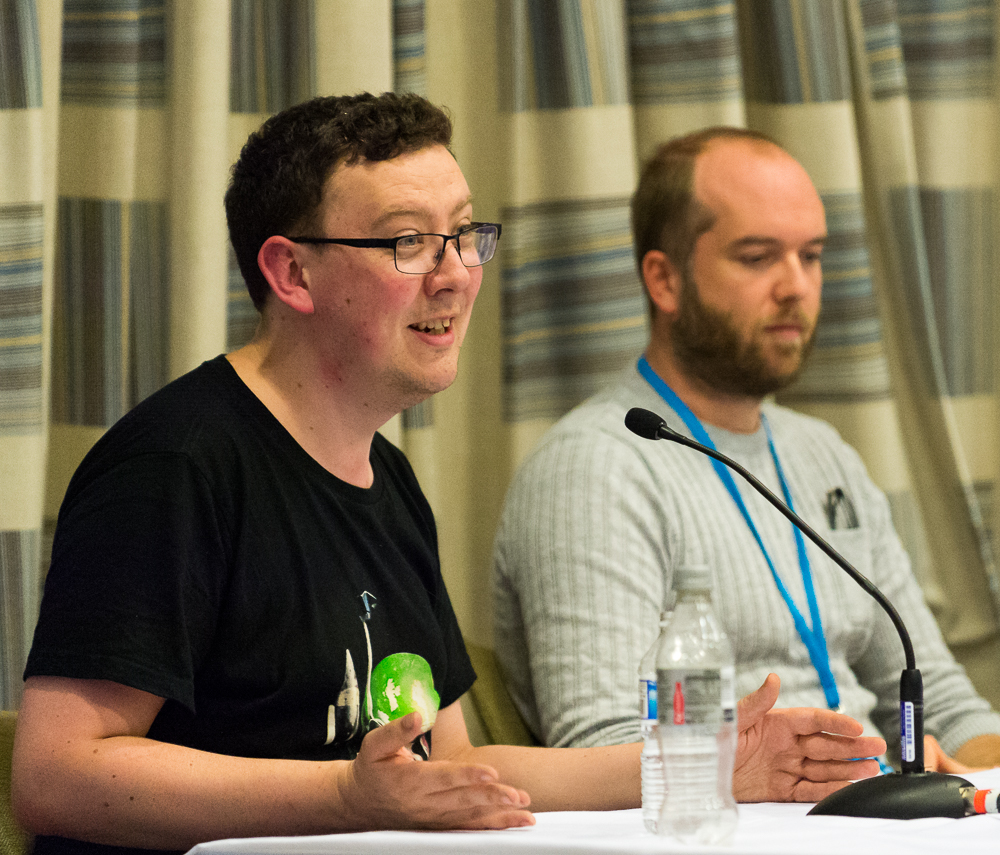
James Ball, "Fact-checking in the Fake News Era" panel at QED 2017

In September 2015 Ball joined the UK division of BuzzFeed as part of their investigative journalism team. Since 2016 Ball has also written articles for The New European, a British pro-European newspaper.

Ball was a judge for the 2016 Amnesty International UK Media Awards. Ball was part of the team whose investigation into HSBC's money laundering was longlisted for The Orwell Prize for Exposing Britain's Social Evils.

Ball has been critical of the lack of fact-checking by journalists and news consumers, of using clickbait headlines and the culture of media being forced to rely on advertising revenue from 'clicks' and social media 'shares' and has said, "While we are demanding that the audience trust mainstream outlets and put us on a higher pedestal, our business models favour getting the clicks – if you'd had stopped and waited to verify and check, you'd have missed out on the traffic all-together and got no revenue, so we actually reward running this unchecked footage."

== Awards in journalism ==
Ball has received several awards during his career for journalism and investigative journalism including,

- 2012 Laurence Stern fellowship winner at The Washington Post
- 2013 XCity Alumni Award from City, University of London for his work in data journalism
- 2014 Royal Statistical Society Award for Statistical Excellence in Journalism (joint winner) in the print category for his work on 'The Thatcher effect', the legacy of Margaret Thatcher's public policy using historical data.

Ball has been a member of investigative journalism teams which were awarded

- 2011 Amnesty International digital journalism award
- 2013 Paul Foot Award special investigation prize for reporting on the files leaked by Edward Snowden
- 2013 The Scripps Howard Foundation Roy W. Howard Award for Public Service Reporting for coverage of the National Security Agency data collection files.
- 2014 The Pulitzer Prize for Public Service with the Guardian US for reporting on surveillance by the National Security Agency, and "helping through aggressive reporting to spark a debate about the relationship between the government and the public over issues of security and privacy."
- 2016 Press Gazette British Journalism Awards, Investigation of the year Award for HSBC money laundering investigative reporting.

== Books ==
WikiLeaks: News in the Networked Era, co-authored with Charlie Beckett, was published in 2012 by Polity Publishing and is a detailed record of the history of Julian Assange and WikiLeaks, Chelsea Manning and Edward Snowden, and how this played out across journalistic media.

The Infographic History of the World, co-authored with Valentina D'Efilippo, was published 2013 by Collins. It is a representation of human history using infographics, or visual representations of data with text commentaries. The Economist praised its mostly "terrific charts" but stated some lacked "infographical discipline".

Post-Truth: How Bullshit Conquered the World, published 2017 by Biteback Publishing, discusses how truth has become devalued in the current socio-political climate, how the political left and right tend to exist in an "eco-system of bullshit: the combination of campaigns, media, technologies and more that come together to spread questionable information", and examines whether this is a phenomenon post- Brexit and the Trump campaign. It has been described as "thorough and courageously even-handed" (The Times) and expressing a "vivid analysis of how the business models and incentives currently prevailing in digital media render decent discourse all but inaudible" (Kazuo Ishiguro).

Bluffocracy was co-authored with Andrew Greenway and published 2018 by Biteback Publishing. It looks at members of the British establishment and those in positions of influence, and the culture of lying and pretence in place of competency and real skill.

The System: Who Owns the Internet, and How It Owns Us (U.S. title: The Tangled Web We Weave: Inside the Shadow System That Shapes the Internet) published in August 2020. It documents the inner workings of the system and the real-life figures who power the internet.

The Other Pandemic: How QAnon contaminated the world was published in 2023 by Bloomsbury Publishing. It examines the development of the QAnon conspiracy theory, comparing it to a spreading disease.

== See also ==
- James Bamford
- Julian Borger
- Nick Davies
- Barton Gellman
- Janine Gibson
- Glenn Greenwald
- Ewen MacAskill
- Alan Rusbridger
