= Liz Sayce =

Liz Sayce OBE
- Employers: Disability Rights UK; Centre for Mental Health; Disability Rights Commission; Mind; Furzedown Project
- Known for: Disability rights advocacy
- Notable work: From Psychiatric Patient to Citizen (2000); Taking Control of Employment Support (2013)
- Board member of: North Central London Integrated Care Board; ADD International; EHRC Disability Advisory Committee
- Honours: OBE; Honorary Doctorate (University of Kent)

Liz Sayce OBE is a disability rights advocate who has worked as a Director of Mind, RADAR, and Disability Rights UK. In 2000, she published her first book, From Psychiatric Patient to Citizen and has served as the chair on various independent reviews conducted by the UK Government.

== Work ==
Sayce worked in psychiatric hospitals between 1985 and 1987, as a Mental Health Project Worker. She later said the experience motivated her to do something about the way that disabled people are discriminated.

In 1987, she became the programme coordinator, for the Centre for Mental Health. She later worked as their Research and Development Officer. In 1990, Sayce began working as the Policy Director for the mental health charity Mind. During this time she lobbied for the Disability Discrimination Act 1995. In 1998, Sayce became the Director of Lambeth Southwark and Lewisham Health Action Zone, stepping down in 2000.

Sayce published From Psychiatric Patient to Citizen in 2000. The book proposes theoretical models and strategies for supporting people struggling with mental illnesses. The book was published by Springer Nature.

Sayce worked at the Disability Rights Commission between 2000 and 2007, as their Policy Officer, Communication Officer, and later, as their Director. In 2008, Sayce was awarded an OBE for her work serving disabled people.

In 2011, Sayce led the independent review into specialist employment programmes for disabled people. The review looked at how Work Choice, and the Work Programme were supporting disabled people and outlined a series of key points that could help guide the programs in the future. The report also looked into how Access to Work, Remploy, and Residential Training Colleges provided specialist support to keep disabled people in work, with Sayce suggesting that funding spent on Remploy factories could be better used to support disabled people in other work roles. Following the review, ministers announced the factories would be closing in March 2012. The closures went ahead, with all Remploy factories closed in October 2013. Sayce's recommendations were controversial with disabled people and unions, who felt that prior factory workers were likely to end up in long term unemployment.

Between 2007 and 2012 Sayce was the Chief Executive of RADAR, a role she continued following the merger that led to the creation of Disability Rights UK. She was the Chief Executive of Disability Rights UK until 2017.

In October 2013 Sayce co-wrote, Taking Control of Employment Support with Neil Crowther for Disability Rights UK. The paper looked into the impact that the Work Choice program had on disabled people seeking support to work. Sayce later said that "The Work Programme is a non-work programme as far as disabled people are concerned" due to the lack of individualised support provided by the program. The Guardian later called the paper's finding "damning".

In 2014 she was awarded an honorary doctorate by the University of Kent.

In 2018, Sayce chaired The Commission for Equality in Mental Health, which was hosted by the UK charity Centre for Mental Health. The two-year investigation concluded in 2020 and found that mental health inequalities could be reduced if national and local action was taken. It concluded with a ten-point plan on how inequalities could be reduced.

Sayce served as the Interim Chair of the Social Security Advisory Committee from August 2019-August 2020. Sayce has served as an non-executive member of the North Central London Integrated Care Board since 2022.

In October 2024, Sayce was announced as the chair for the independent review into Carer's Allowance overpayments.

Sayce is a Visiting Professor for the London School of Economics International Inequalities Institute. Sayce previously served as a trustee of the Furzedown Project, before later becoming the charity's chair. The charity supports older members of the Furzedown area find community and stay connected.

== Bibliography ==
=== Books ===
- Outsiders Coming in?: Achieving Social Inclusion for People with Mental Health Problems. Mind Publications. 1999. ISBN 9781874690900.
- From Psychiatric Patient to Citizen: Overcoming Discrimination and Social Exclusion. Bloomsbury Publishing. 2000. ISBN 9780333698891.
- From Psychiatric Patient to Citizen Revisited - Foundations of Mental Health Practice. Bloomsbury Publishing. 2015. ISBN 9781137360410.

=== Selected Papers ===
- Taking Control of Employment Support (2013)
