= David Conn =

British sports journalist

- Born: 1965 (age 60–61); Salford, United Kingdom
- Occupation: Sports journalist
- Spouse: Sarah

David Conn is an investigative journalist who writes for The Guardian. He won the Paul Foot Award for investigations into Conservative peer Michelle Mone, who profited from the PPE contracts during the COVID-19 pandemic.

He attended Bury Grammar School before studying English Literature & Politics at the University of York.

He has written four books. Three of them, The Football Business: Fair Game in the '90s? (1998), The Beautiful Game?: Searching the Soul of Football (2005) and Richer Than God: Manchester City, Modern Football and Growing Up (2012), focus on the influence of money on modern day English football. His fourth, The Fall of the House of FIFA (2017), focusses on corruption within football's world governing body.

He also ghost-wrote the autobiographies of the 100m hurdles world record holder Colin Jackson and former Manchester United player Lee Sharpe.

Conn has been named sports news reporter of the year three times, in 2004, 2009 and 2013, by the Sports Journalists Association, and has been named Football Writer of the Year by the Football Supporters Federation three times, in 2002, 2005 and 2009. In December 2013 he was named Sports Journalist of the Year in the Press Gazette British Journalism Awards.

His 2009 article for The Guardian, detailing the bereaved Hillsborough families' continuing campaign for justice, prompted the then Labour ministers Andy Burnham and Maria Eagle to press for all official documents relating to the disaster to be released.

In 2012 Conn was named among the top 10 most influential sportswriters in Britain by the trade publication, Press Gazette.

In 2011 he presented a BBC Inside Out documentary that looked into the ownership issues of Leeds United.

== Bibliography ==
- The Football Business: Fair Game in the '90s? (1998) ISBN 1-84018-101-X
- The Beautiful Game?: Searching the Soul of Football (2005) ISBN 0-224-06436-3
- Richer Than God: Manchester City, Modern Football and Growing Up (2012) ISBN 0-857-38486-4
- The Fall of the House of FIFA (2017) ISBN 978-0224100441
