= Gabriel Pogrund =

Journalist

- Born: 1994 or 1995 (age 31–32)
- Education: University College London
- Occupation: Journalist

Gabriel Pogrund (born 1994 or 1995) is a journalist who is currently Whitehall editor at The Sunday Times.

He graduated with a BA in geography from University College London in 2016. While a student he pursued student journalism, and was editor of The Tab London.

He was a freelance writer at the Jewish News in 2016. In 2018, he was a Stern Fellow at The Washington Post.

In 2023, Pogrund broke the story of BBC chairman Richard Sharp failing to declare perceived conflicts of interest, which ultimately resulted in Sharp's resignation in April 2023.

In 2020, Pogrund and Patrick Maguire published Left Out: The Inside Story of Labour Under Corbyn, and in 2025 they published Get In: The Inside Story of Labour Under Starmer.

Pogrund is Jewish.

== Awards ==
- 2017 – Young Journalist of the Year at The Press Awards
- 2021 – British Journalism Award for anti-corruption journalism (with John Collingridge) for their reporting on the Greensill scandal
- 2022 – Scoop of the Year at the London Press Club awards
- 2023 – Journalist of the Year at the British Journalism Awards
- 2025 – News Reporter of the Year at The Press Awards
- 2025 – Political Journalist of the Year at The Press Awards
