= Peter Schofield (civil servant) =

British civil servant (born 1969)

Sir Peter Schofield KCB
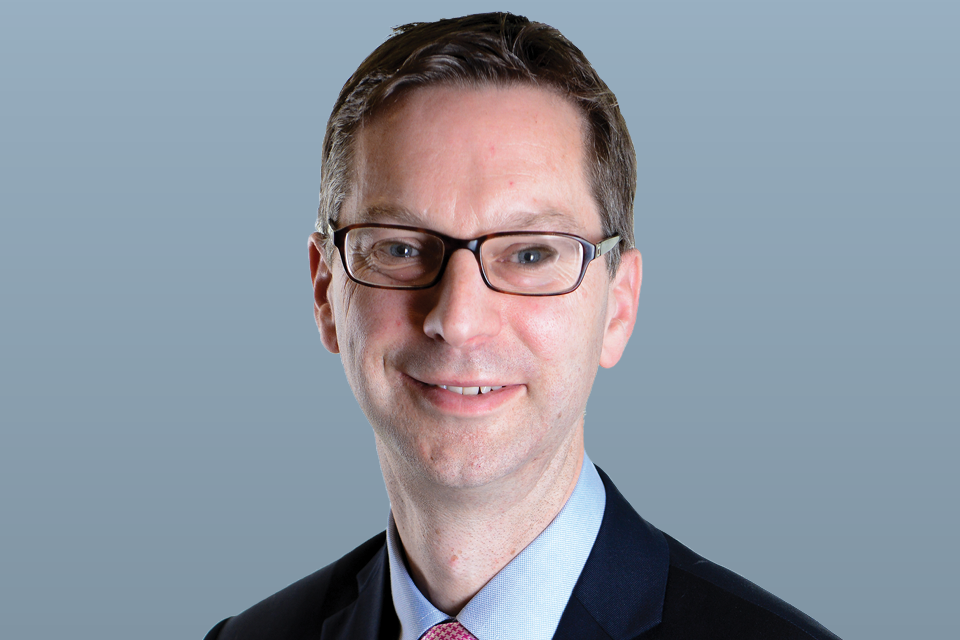

Permanent Secretary for the Department for Work and Pensions
- In office January 2018 – July 2026
- Minister: Esther McVey; Amber Rudd; Thérèse Coffey; Chloe Smith; Mel Stride; Liz Kendall; Pat McFadden
- Preceded by: Sir Robert Devereux
- Succeeded by: Sarah Healey

Personal details
- Born: Peter Hugh Gordon Schofield; 27 April 1969 (age 57)
- Website: gov.uk/government/people/peter-schofield

Sir Peter Hugh Gordon Schofield, KCB (born 27 April 1969) is a former senior British civil servant who served as Permanent Secretary for the Department for Work and Pensions from January 2018 to July 2026.

== Biography ==
Born in 1969, Schofield was educated at the Whitgift School and then Gonville and Caius at Cambridge, and then joined the civil service into HM Treasury in 1991. Schofield spent two years on secondment to 3i in 2002–2004, then returned to the civil service in the Shareholder Executive. In 2008, Schofield was promoted and moved to be the director of the Enterprise and Growth Unit in the Treasury, whilst retaining ex officio membership of ShEx's board.

In 2012, Schofield was promoted again to be a director-general, heading the Neighbourhoods Group of the Department of Communities and Local Government for four years. Then he transferred to the Department for Work and Pensions in 2016 as director-general for finance. In January 2018, he succeeded Sir Robert Devereux as the department's permanent secretary.

In April 2019 Schofield was appointed as chair of the Charity for Civil Servants, a role he held until July 2026.

Schofield was appointed a Companion of the Order of the Bath in the Queen's Birthday Honours for 2017 and a Knight Commander of the same order in the King's Birthday Honours for 2024.

In February 2026 Schofield announced his intention to step down as permanent secretary in July due to personal reasons. He was succeeded by Sarah Healey who previously led the Ministry of Housing, Communities and Local Government.

Government offices
Preceded by Sir Robert Devereux	Permanent Secretary of the Department for Work and Pensions; 2018–	Incumbent
