= Prime Minister's Office (United Kingdom) =

Office supporting the Prime Minister

- Downing Street letterhead

- Prime Minister's Office logo

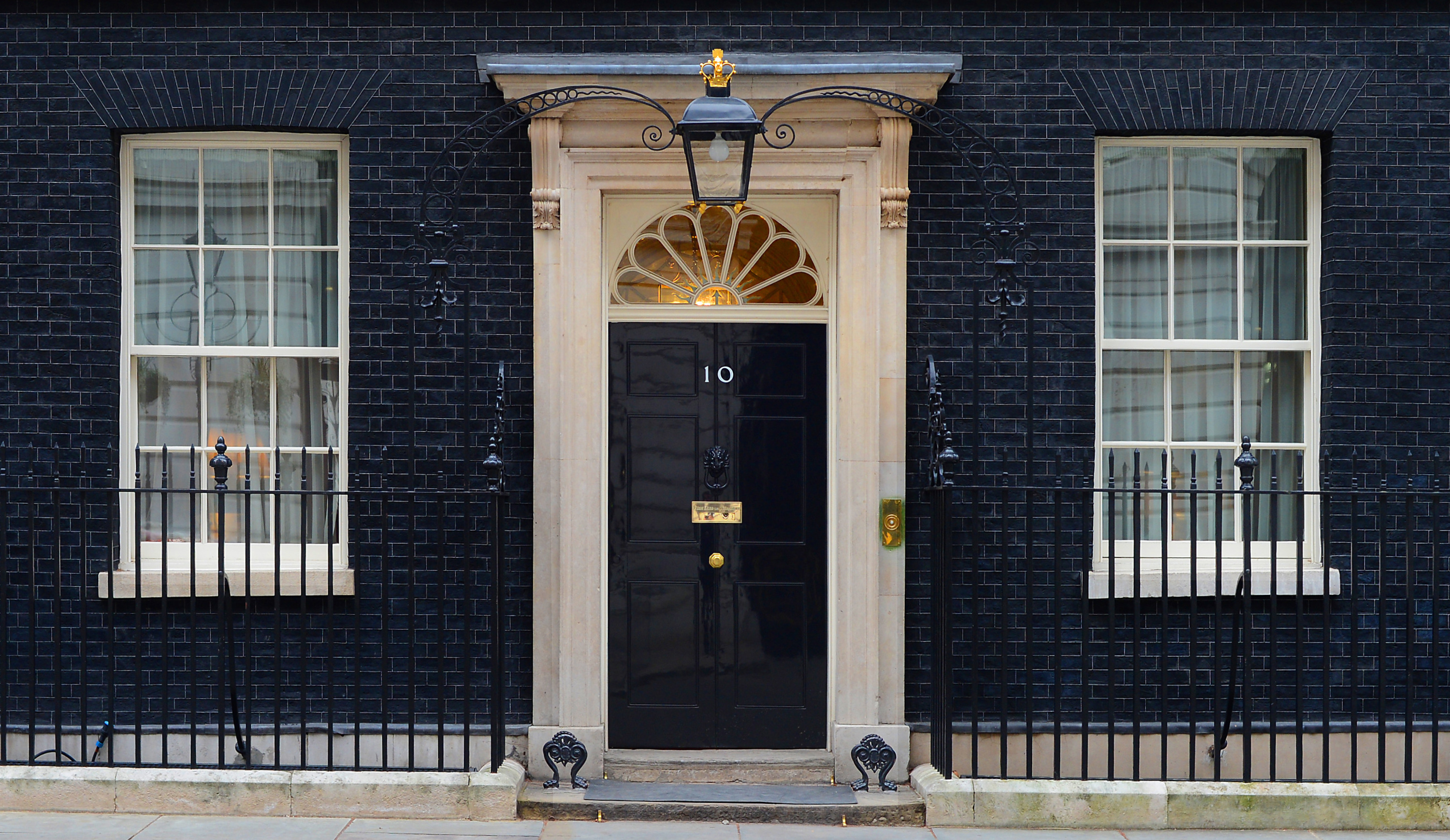
- Contained within Number 10 Downing Street is the Prime Minister's Office, as well as his official residence.

Agency overview
- Jurisdiction: UK Government
- Headquarters: 10 Downing Street, London, United Kingdom
- Employees: c.250 (2017)
- Agency executives: James Purnell, Downing Street Chief of Staff; Principal Private Secretary; Deputy Principal Private Secretary; Tom Wells and Grace Pritchard, Prime Minister's Official Spokesperson
- Parent department: Office for the Prime Minister and Cabinet
- Website: gov.uk/government/organisations/prime-ministers-office-10-downing-street

The Prime Minister's Office in the United Kingdom supports the work of the prime minister in his executive, parliamentary and party-political roles. The office is located in 10 Downing Street and the terms Downing Street and Number 10 are often used as metonyms for the office itself. Technically the Prime Minister's Office is part of the Cabinet Office, although in practice the two are said to be 'organisationally distinct'.

The Prime Minister's Office is staffed by a mix of career civil servants, who are required to be politically impartial, and temporary civil servants known as special advisers, who are by contrast political appointees. The highest ranking civil servant position is the principal private secretary to the prime minister; the most senior special adviser post is the Downing Street chief of staff.

Since the Prime Minister's Office is formally part of the Cabinet Office, it reports directly to the cabinet secretary. A communicating door between 10 Downing Street and 70 Whitehall provides a select number of people with access between these two offices.

After becoming prime minister on 20 July 2026, Andy Burnham created an Office for the Prime Minister and Cabinet incorporating the Prime Minister's Office at 10 Downing Street, the newly established Number 10 North, and core Cabinet Office functions serving the prime minister and cabinet.

== Current positions within the Office of the Prime Minister ==
=== Civil Service appointments ===
As of July 2023, the following positions in the Prime Minister's Office were occupied by senior civil servants:

- Principal Private Secretary to the Prime Minister
- Director, No. 10 Delivery Unit
- Director, No. 10 Policy Unit
- Director of Data Science & Chief Analyst
- Deputy Principal Private Secretary to the PM
- Deputy Director, No. 10 Delivery Unit
- Prime Minister's Official Spokesperson
- Private Secretary to the Prime Minister (International)

(The above list only includes the most senior civil service appointments, namely those in SCS Pay Bands 2 and 3.)

=== Political appointments ===
As of 2025 the following senior roles at Number 10 were occupied by political appointees.

Office	Name	Took office	Prime Minister
Chief of Staff	James Purnell	20 July 2026	Andy Burnham
Deputy Chief of Staff (Number 10 North)	Caroline Simpson	20 July 2026	Andy Burnham
Deputy Chief of Staff and Transition Director	Alison Phillips	20 July 2026	Andy Burnham
Director of Political Strategy	Matthew McGregor	20 July 2026	Andy Burnham
Political Director to the Prime Minister	Hayden Munro	20 July 2026	Andy Burnham
Director of Policy	Graeme Cooke	20 July 2026	Andy Burnham
Director of Communications	Sarah Brown	20 July 2026	Andy Burnham
Press Secretary	John Stevens	20 July 2026	Andy Burnham
Parliamentary Private Secretary to the Prime Minister			Andy Burnham

Since 2005, Number 10's Direct Communication Unit has not used its staff's real names on signed correspondence to MPs and members of the public; this is for security reasons.

== History ==
The role of prime minister came into being gradually over time (and the Prime Minister's Office likewise). The beginnings of an office can be seen in the 18th century, when the first Private Secretary was appointed.

=== Private Secretaries and the Principal Private Secretary ===
During his second term of office as Prime Minister (1757–62) the Duke of Newcastle appointed a Private Secretary. Unlike the Treasury clerks, who supported his work as First Lord of the Treasury, the Private Secretary was a personal appointment, paid for by Newcastle himself. Similar appointments were made by his successors.

In 1806, the role of Private Secretary to the Prime minister was placed on an official footing, when his salary began to be paid from public funds. In 1813 funding was made available for a second Private Secretary to be added to the establishment.

The Private Secretaries supported the Prime Minister both administratively and politically. During the 19th century it became the norm for one of them to be appointed from within the civil service (usually one of the Treasury clerks was seconded to the role), and the other to be appointed from outside the civil service (sometimes a Member of Parliament was appointed, in which case he was unpaid); the latter usually had seniority. Both were seen as personal and to some extent political appointees: it was usual for them to be replaced when there was a change of prime minister, and this was invariably the case when there was a change of government.

Gladstone had become entitled to a third Private Secretary in 1873, when he held the office of Chancellor of the Exchequer concurrently with that of prime minister; afterwards a third Private Secretary remained on the Prime Minister's establishment. At least one of the three was a civil servant, but the senior (or principal) Private Secretary was normally a political appointee.

A fourth Private Secretary was provided for the Prime Minister in the 1920s, a fifth in the 1940s and a sixth in the 1960s. The official designation of one of their number as the 'Principal Private Secretary' dates from 1929. By this time the office had begun to be more civil service dominated: between 1922 and 1928, despite several changes of prime minister and a change of government from Conservative to Labour, three of the four Private Secretaries had remained in post; since when the post of Principal Private Secretary has almost invariably been occupied by a career civil servant.

=== Private Office of the Prime Minister ===
The designation of the Private Secretaries and others as the Private Office of the Prime Minister would seem to date from the time of Lloyd George. It served to differentiate them from the separate (and relatively short-lived) Prime Minister's Secretariat which he established, as well as distinguishing them from the new Cabinet Secretariat (which would later evolve into the Cabinet Office). The establishment of the Private Office also coincided with a marked increase in the number of clerical staff employed at Number 10; by the 1950s there were over fifty clerks, typists, messengers and cleaners on the books.

=== Press Office ===
A full-time Press Officer was first appointed to the Prime Minister's Office in 1931, who took on responsibility for public relations (formerly part of the private secretaries' remit). Over time, the press office grew in significance as media attention on the Prime Minister intensified. Margaret Thatcher's press secretary, Bernard Ingham, was one of her most important advisors. Alastair Campbell's influence, as press secretary under Tony Blair, was even greater, and in 2000 he was given a more senior role as Downing Street Director of Communications, with the authority to issue directives to civil servants.

=== Political Office ===
By the 1930s, the Private Office had largely become the preserve of civil servants, leaving no obvious place in the structure for the Prime Minister's political advisers. This was addressed by Harold Wilson, who in 1964 established a Political Office in Number 10, staffed by a number of 'special advisers', who were political appointees. To begin with the Principal Private Secretary tried to maintain a strict separation between the work of the private office and that of the political office, but there soon came to be a 'considerable overlap of responsibilities', reflecting more accurately the relationship between politics and administration at the top of government.

By the time John Major took over as prime minister, the Political Office was a loose grouping which included:

- the Political Secretary to the Prime Minister of the United Kingdom (responsible for links between the Prime Minister and party headquarters, and with constituency organisations around the country);
- the Parliamentary Private Secretary to the Prime Minister (focused on relations with the parliamentary party);
- a constituency secretary;
- a diary secretary / personal assistant.

=== Policy Unit ===
The Policy Unit was also established by Harold Wilson, ten years later (in 1974). Its head is a political appointee. Its remit was to advise the Prime Minister on policy with a view to improving co-ordination across different government departments.

=== Chief of Staff ===
The Chief of Staff is a political appointee, usually the most senior of the Downing Street special advisers. The first prime minister to appoint a chief of staff was Margaret Thatcher in 1979; David Wolfson was one of her closes aides, and when he resigned in 1985 he was not replaced. The role was re-introduced to Downing Street with the appointment of Jonathan Powell under Tony Blair, in 1997.

At times the post has been left vacant, including for a time under Gordon Brown (from January 2008 to May 2010) and also for a time under Boris Johnson (from July 2019 to November 2020). Brown initially appointed a 'Chief of Strategy and Principal Adviser' instead, but he resigned eight months later. Under Johnson, the role was split into two positions with Dominic Cummings serving as the chief adviser to the prime minister, and Edward Lister as chief strategic adviser to the prime minister. After Cummings's departure, Lister served as acting chief of staff before being replaced by Dan Rosenfield, who officially assumed the role in January 2021.

=== Reconfiguration of the office, 2001–2025 ===
At the start of the 21st century the Prime Minister's Office consisted of:

- The No. 10 Private Office (coordination of government, diary management and correspondence);
- The No. 10 Press Office (press and public relations);
- The No. 10 Political Office (political relations, parliamentary affairs and constituency liaison);
- The No. 10 Policy Unit (policy research, review and advice).

Under Tony Blair in 2001, the office was reorganised into three directorates:

- Policy and government
  Took over the functions of the private office and policy unit. Prepares advice for the PM and coordinates implementation of policy across departments.
- Communication and strategy
  - Press office: responsible for relations with the media
  - Direct communications unit
  - Research and information unit: provides factual information to No. 10
  - Strategy unit
- Government and political relations
  Handles party and constituency matters

The reorganisation brought about the fusion of the old Prime Minister's Office and other Cabinet Office teams, with a number of units (including the Prime Minister's Strategy Unit) now reporting directly into the Prime Minister's Office. Led by special advisers, these new specialist units were conceived in order 'to drive change across government'.

All these changes were intended to strengthen the PM's office. Some commentators have suggested that they created something similar to a Prime Minister's Department; (Note: The Times political correspondent Peter Riddell discussed the consequences of the reform in an article entitled "New look behind the revolving doors of power" in which he observed "Mr Blair has not formally set up a Prime Minister's Department, in order to avoid charges of presidentialism, but he has created one in all but name in 10 Downing Street".) whereas the Institute for Government has written that the Cabinet Office (of which the Prime Minister's Office is a component) "is a long way from becoming a fully fledged premier's department", primarily based on the fact that the prime minister "largely lacks the direct policy responsibilities, either in statute or by convention under the Royal Prerogative, possessed by secretaries of state, who have substantial budgets voted to them by Parliament".

==== Permanent Secretary ====
Occasionally, and briefly, a senior civil servant has been appointed as Downing Street Permanent Secretary, with seniority over the other civil servants in Number 10 (including the Principal Private Secretary). Jeremy Heywood served in this role from 2010 to 2012, and Simon Case from May to September 2020. It has been said that the creation of the role served (on both occasions) 'as a way to convince someone back into government after they have left'.

In 2022, in her report about parties being held on Government premises during the COVID pandemic, Sue Gray concluded that the size of the Downing Street operation had increased without the structures to support them, and "too much responsibility and expectation is placed on the senior official whose principal function is ... support of the Prime Minister". She said this needed to be addressed as a priority, and Boris Johnson agreed to the Office of the Prime Minister becoming a Government department. Several changes in staffing took place early in February 2022 and the role of Downing Street Permanent Secretary was set to be revived, with Samantha Jones holding the position on an interim basis; but the plans were not carried forward after Johnson's resignation as prime minister.

==== Chief Secretary to the Prime Minister ====
In September 2025, as a part of a reshuffle of Downing Street, Keir Starmer appointed Darren Jones as Chief Secretary to the Prime Minister. On July 20 2026 however, the office was left vacant after Jones resigned and due to all the new reforms Andy Burnham has introduced, no formal replacement has been chosen.

=== 2026 reorganisation ===
After taking office in July 2026, Andy Burnham created a new Office for the Prime Minister and Cabinet, incorporating the Prime Minister's Office at 10 Downing Street, the newly established Number 10 North, and assuming core Cabinet Office functions which serve the prime minister and cabinet.

== See also ==
- Number 10 North
