= Kevin Lee (political aide) =

British political aide

Special Adviser to the Prime Minister at Number 10 North
- Incumbent
- Assumed office August 2026
- Prime Minister: Andy Burnham
- Preceded by: Office established

Director of the Office of the Mayor of Greater Manchester
- In office 2017–2026
- Mayor: Andy Burnham; Paul Dennett (interim)
- Preceded by: Office established
- Succeeded by: Ross MacRae

Personal details
- Party: Labour

Kevin Lee is a British political aide who has served under Labour Party politician Andy Burnham, now the Prime Minister of the United Kingdom, for more than 15 years. Since August 2026, he has worked as a Special Adviser at Number 10 North. He previously served as the Director of the Mayor’s Office at the Greater Manchester Combined Authority from 2017 to July 2026, and before that worked as Burnham's adviser when he was Member of Parliament for Leigh.

== Biography ==
Lee joined the Labour Party aged 15. He later began a career in the Civil Service in Customs and Excise for around 10 years. He began working for the Labour Party during the 1994 local elections. He later served as the party's Regional Director for the North West of England when he first worked with Andy Burnham. He then worked in private consultancy for some years, including for Lancashire County Cricket Club.

Lee headed Andy Burnham’s failed campaign during the 2010 Labour Party leadership election as campaign manager. He served as the head of Burnham's office during his time as Shadow Health Secretary (2011–2015) and Shadow Home Secretary (2015–2016).

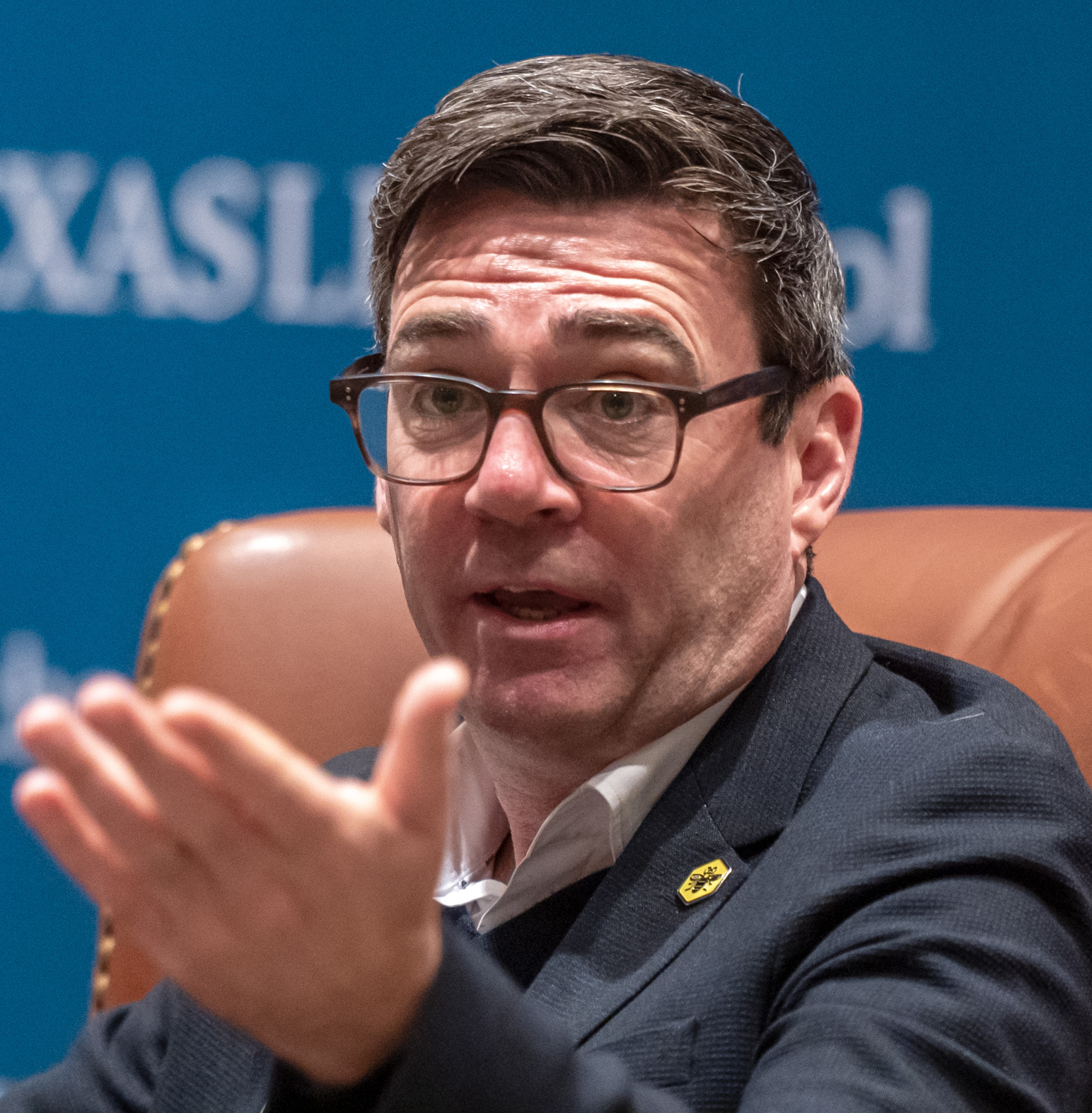
Andy Burnham as Greater Manchester Mayor in 2025 wearing a Bee Network pin.

When Burnham was then elected as Mayor of Greater Manchester in 2017, Lee took up the role as Director of the Mayor’s Office and political adviser to the Mayor.

Lee advised Burnham throughout the 2026 Makerfield by-election and the 2026 Labour Party leadership crisis. He was widely expected to be given a senior aide role under Burnham following his victory in the 2026 Labour Party leadership election and his incoming appointment as Prime Minister of the United Kingdom. In July 2026, it was reported that Lee was moving into the new Manchester-based government operation after the 2026 Greater Manchester mayoral by-election. In August 2026, he became a Special Adviser to the Prime Minister at Number 10 North.
