= Institute for Government =

British independent think tank

- Formation: 2008
- Type: Think tank
- Headquarters: 2 Carlton Gardens, London, SW1Y 5AA
- Location: London, England
- Director: Hannah White
- Website: www.instituteforgovernment.org.uk

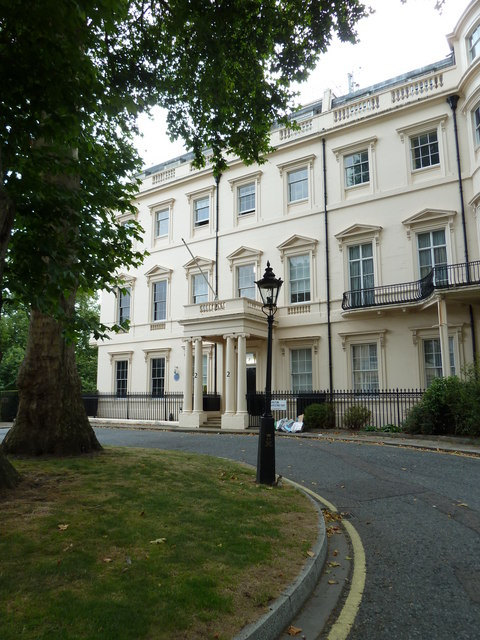
Carlton Gardens

The Institute for Government (IfG) is a British independent think tank which aims to improve government effectiveness through research and analysis. Based at 2 Carlton Gardens in central London and founded as a charity in 2008, it was initially funded with approximately £15 million by the Gatsby Charitable Foundation, at the instigation of Lord Sainsbury.

== Stated aims ==
The Institute for Government works to make government more effective. It engages with UK MPs, senior civil servants and others by:

- supporting the development and skills of senior public servants, politicians and political advisors.
- conducting and funding research on public administration and government.
- providing 'thought leadership' on effective government through publications, seminars and events.

The Institute is a registered charity in England and Wales (No. 1123926) with cross-party governance.

== Directors ==
In October 2022, Hannah White replaced Bronwen Maddox as director. For the previous six years, White had been deputy director of the Institute, and was appointed OBE in the 2020 Birthday Honours for services to the constitution. Previously, she had spent 10 years at the House of Commons as a parliamentary clerk before running the Committee on Standards in Public Life in the Cabinet Office.

Sir Michael Bichard was its first director until 2010. The subsequent directors were Lord Adonis and Peter Riddell.

== Funding ==
The Institute for Government was rated as 'highly transparent' in its 2018 funding by Transparify.

In November 2022, the funding transparency website Who Funds You? gave the institute a B grade on a scale from A to E.

== Reports ==
A 2024 IfG report "Power with Purpose" recommended restructuring the Prime Minister's Office and Cabinet Office into one department, alongside a new department responsible for the civil service. Reporting of the creation of the Office for the Prime Minister and Cabinet by the incoming Burnham administration in 2026 noted some similarity.

== Recognition ==
In 2019, the Institute was named Think Tank of the Year in Prospect's annual awards. In 2022, it was named Political Communicator of the Year by the Political Studies Association.

== See also ==
- Royal Institute of Public Administration
