= Josh Berry (comedian) =

British comedian

Joshua Henry Hyde Berry
- Born: 5 July 1996; Crewe, England
- Education: Reading Blue Coat School, Oxford University
- Occupation(s): Comedian, writer, celebrity impressionist
- Notable work: Voice Thief, Staggering Hubris

Joshua Henry Hyde Berry (born 5 July 1996 in Crewe, England) is a British comedian, writer and celebrity impressionist.

== Early life ==
The son of a teacher and accountant, Berry was born in Cheshire but grew up in Reading. He was educated at Reading Blue Coat School before going on to read philosophy and theology at Oxford University.

== Career ==
He began his career doing impressions of tennis players, appearing on the BBC's Live @ Wimbledon aged just 16. He later came to the attention of Andy Murray, who greatly increased Berry's visibility by retweeting one of his videos. In 2018, they appeared on screen together when Murray played a sports reporter interviewing Berry in his Murray guise. In the same year, Berry took his show Voice Thief to the Edinburgh Festival Fringe. And in 2019, he returned to the Fringe to perform Josh Berry: Who Does He Think He Is?, a show based on impressions of celebrities including James Acaster and Louis Theroux. He has been on BBC Radio 4 Extra's Newsjack and Radio 4's Dead Ringers.

After Boris Johnson became prime minister in 2019, he developed the character of Rafe Hubris, an arrogant, Eton-educated Special Adviser (SpAd) at 10 Downing Street, who calls Johnson 'BloJo', his chief of staff Dominic Cummings 'Big Daddy Cum-Cum' and health secretary Matt Hancock 'Matt Cock-in-his-Hands'. Writing in the Evening Standard, political commentator Anne McElvoy called his send-up of 'spad' culture "pitch-perfect". The character is reported to be a big hit among real-life special advisers.

Berry's spoof 2020 diary Staggering Hubris, written in Rafe Hubris' voice, purports to tell the real story of the chaos behind the scenes as the British government attempted to deal with the COVID-19 pandemic. The book, with its account of parties and rule-breaking at Downing Street, began to look uncannily prescient as the Johnson government was engulfed by the Westminster lockdown parties controversy. As critic Peter Magee wrote in The Bookbag: 'What begins as a light-hearted spoof on life in Downing Street turns into something resembling a fly-on-the-wall documentary. There came a point when it almost ceased to be funny because it seems that it was all true...'

== Bibliography ==
- Berry, Josh (2021). Staggering Hubris: The memoir of Boris Johnson's most classic SPAD: The 'Rona Years, Vol. 1. London: Lightning Books. ISBN 978-1785633072.
