= Manfred Schlickenrieder =

German private investigator

Manfred Schlickenrieder is a German private investigator. He is known for his undercover operations against Greenpeace, Body Shop, and other environmental targets in the 1990s on behalf of the German spy agency Bundesnachrichtendienst and Hakluyt & Company, a private investigating firm set up by former agents of MI6.
