= Special adviser (United Kingdom) =

Politically appointed adviser to a UK government body

A Special Adviser, also known as a SpAd, is a temporary civil servant who advises and assists UK government ministers or ministers in the Scottish and Welsh devolved governments. They differ from impartial civil servants in that they are political appointees.

Special advisers are paid by the government and appointed under Section 15 of the Constitutional Reform and Governance Act 2010. There are four pay bands for special advisers.

== Background ==
Special advisers were first appointed from 1964 under the Harold Wilson's first Labour government to provide political advice to Ministers and have been subsequently utilised by all following governments.

== Code of conduct ==
Advisers are governed by a code of conduct which goes some way to defining their role and delineates relations with the permanent civil service, contact with the media and relationship with the governing party, inter alia:

the employment of special advisers adds a political dimension to the advice and assistance available to Ministers while reinforcing the political impartiality of the permanent Civil Service by distinguishing the source of political advice and support [...] Special advisers are employed to help Ministers on matters where the work of Government and the work of the Government Party overlap and where it would be inappropriate for permanent civil servants to become involved. They are an additional resource for the Minister providing assistance from a standpoint that is more politically committed and politically aware than would be available to a Minister from the permanent Civil Service.

The rules for their appointment, and status in relation to ministers, are set out in the Ministerial Code.

== Number and cost of special advisers ==
=== Number ===
There is no legal limit on the number of special advisers, although the current total is less than it was under Tony Blair. The government had previously accepted calls, made in 2000 by the Neill Committee on Standards in Public Life, for such a legal cap. By 2002, however, the government had altered its position, saying in response to the Wicks Committee report on standards in public life that "the Government does not believe that the issue of special advisers can be considered as a numerical issue. The issue is about being transparent, about accountability and about roles and responsibilities, as well as about numbers".

=== Cost ===
The total cost of special advisers in 2006–07 was £5.9 million, which has since increased to £15.9 million in 2022-2023.

There are four pay bands (1–4) for special advisers.

== Current special advisers ==
As of 31 March 2025, there were 130 special advisers, or 128.67 full-time equivalents, working for the government.

As of July 2026, the following advisers were included in a government list of special advisers in pay band 4.

Name	Minister	Office
James Purnell	Andy Burnham	Prime Minister
Alison Phillips	Andy Burnham	Prime Minister
Emma Norris	Andy Burnham	Prime Minister
Parna Taylor	Andy Burnham	Prime Minister
Matthew McGregor	Andy Burnham	Prime Minister
Hayden Munro	Andy Burnham	Prime Minister
Luke Sullivan	Andy Burnham	Prime Minister
Danny Coyne	Andy Burnham	Prime Minister
Harjeet Sahota	Andy Burnham	Prime Minister
Kate Robson	Andy Burnham	Prime Minister
Cerys Way	Andy Burnham	Prime Minister
Graeme Cooke	Andy Burnham	Prime Minister
Harvey Redgrave	Andy Burnham	Prime Minister
Nathan Yeowell	Andy Burnham	Prime Minister
Jonathan Powell	Andy Burnham	Prime Minister
Henna Shah	Andy Burnham	Prime Minister
Sarah Brown	Andy Burnham	Prime Minister
Grace Pritchard	Andy Burnham	Prime Minister
John Stevens	Andy Burnham	Prime Minister
Calum Masters	Andy Burnham	Prime Minister
Abby Tomlinson	Andy Burnham	Prime Minister
Varun Chandra	Andy Burnham	Prime Minister
Anna Wright	Andy Burnham	Prime Minister
Joy Johnston	Andy Burnham	Prime Minister
Caroline Simpson	Andy Burnham	Prime Minister
Kate Groucutt	Andy Burnham	Prime Minister
Kevin Lee	Andy Burnham	Prime Minister
Tom Whitney	Andy Burnham	Prime Minister
Jon-Paul Spencer	Andy Burnham	Prime Minister
Alicia Kennedy	Louise Haigh	First Secretary of State
Luke Francis	Louise Haigh	First Secretary of State
Jenny Killin	Louise Haigh	First Secretary of State
Maria Herron	Louise Haigh	First Secretary of State
Neil Foster	Louise Haigh	First Secretary of State
Nick Williams	Louise Haigh	First Secretary of State

== Criticisms ==
Special advisers have sometimes been criticised for engaging in advocacy while still on the government payroll or switching directly between lobbying roles and the special adviser role.

Being a special adviser has become a frequent career stage for young politicians, before being elected Members of Parliament, which has attracted criticism.

They are often embroiled in controversy due to their lack of accountability and frequent corruption allegations, including Domminic Cummings violation of COVID guidelines and Peter Mandelson's criminal investigation for leaking classified information to Jeffrey Epstein.

== In fiction ==
Shortly after Boris Johnson became Prime Minister in 2019, British comedian Josh Berry gained online media attention for his character Rafe Hubris, an arrogant, Eton-educated SpAd at 10 Downing Street, who calls Johnson 'BloJo', his chief of staff Dominic Cummings 'Big Daddy Cum-Cum' and health secretary Matt Hancock 'Matt Cock-in-his-Hands'. In 2021, Berry published a spoof diary, Staggering Hubris, written in Hubris' voice, purporting to tell the "real story" of the chaos behind the scenes as the British government attempted to deal with the coronavirus pandemic.

In 2024, former special adviser Dan Corry published a book of short stories featuring special advisers, Tales of the Unelected.

== See also ==
- Ministerial Advisers (Australia)
- Special adviser (Norway)
- Downing Street Chief of Staff
