= Hakluyt & Company =

British private intelligence and management consulting firm

Hakluyt & Company Limited
- Type: Private limited company
- Industry: Management consultancy
- Founded: 1995; 31 years ago
- Founders: Christopher James, Mike Reynolds
- Headquarters: London, United Kingdom
- Key people: Paul Deighton, Chairman; Thomas Ellis, Managing Partner; Jean Veronica Tomlin Russell, Director; Don Vieira, Director
- Revenue: £59.1 million (2018), £84.9 million (2021)
- Operating income: £12.1 million (2018), £17.4 million (2021)
- Website: hakluytandco.com

Hakluyt & Company is a British strategic advisory firm. The company is headquartered in London.

Hakluyt was founded in 1995 by former officials of the British Secret Intelligence Service (MI6). The company has recruited several former British spies and journalists from The Financial Times. The name of the company comes from the geographer Richard Hakluyt.

The firm is chaired by Paul Deighton, and the other members of the board include managing partner Thomas Ellis, Paul Dimitruk, Don Viera, and Jean Tomlin. Its head office is in Upper Brook Street, Mayfair. It also has branches on Park Avenue, Manhattan and Raffles Place, Singapore.

== Board and personnel ==
In 2024, former managing partner Varun Chandra was appointed by Prime Minister Keir Starmer to become his new business and investment adviser. He was succeeded by Thomas Ellis.

Hakluyt's international advisory board is chaired by former British foreign secretary, Lord William Hague. Hague assumed the role in 2024, succeeding Niall FitzGerald, former deputy chairman of Thomson Reuters UK and an adviser to Morgan Stanley. Other board members have included Kieran Prendergast, former Under-Secretary-General for Political Affairs at the United Nations; John Rose, former Rolls-Royce chief executive; Robert Webb, former BBC Worldwide chairman; and E. Neville Isdell, former chair of The Coca-Cola Company.

Andrew Mitchell, former UK Secretary of State for International Development, acted as an adviser to Hakluyt.

Hakluyt has established a network of operatives throughout the world who provide it with intelligence on commercial or political issues of interest to its clients. Operatives used by Hakluyt include embassy staff, former spies, reporters, and well connected government and corporate people.

Hakluyt has strong links with the British intelligence service MI6. The Evening Standard wrote in 2012 that "Spies preparing for retirement are approached discreetly in St James's clubs and asked if they would like some lucrative freelance action to top up their pensions".

Hakluyt refused to comment when asked whether former employees of MI6 were required to cut ties with the intelligence agency when recruited to work at Hakluyt.

== Activities ==
Hakluyt works for large corporations, and has close links with large oil firms. Peter Cazalet, former deputy chairman of BP, helped establish Hakluyt and Peter Holmes, former chairman of Shell, has been president of its foundation.

Its London office compiles reports provided by its field operatives.

In 2001, The Sunday Times reported that oil companies Shell and BP hired Hakluyt to collect information on the environmental group Greenpeace.

In 2012, one of Hakluyt's operatives, Neil Heywood, was found dead in his Chongqing hotel room. Heywood had been close to the local Communist party representative, Bo Xilai, and his wife Gu Kailai. The event became an international incident which included the involvement of then-UK prime minister David Cameron. Gu was in due course convicted of murder and sentenced to death; her sentence was later commuted to 15 years imprisonment.

Bloomberg reported that in 2022, Hakluyt advised about 40% of the world's high market value companies and over fifteen of the top twenty private equity firms.

In 2023, Bloomberg reported that the British Labour Party had "brought in" Hakluyt to help it court the British business community by arranging meetings with prominent business figures. A spokesperson for Hakluyt stated that "we do not work for political parties,” while a Labour spokesperson declined to comment on the association.

Since circa 2023, Hakluyt has been working with Thames Water on a forward strategy for the financially stricken company, including on avoiding renationalisation. A number of former government officials now working for Hakluyt worked on the project, reportedly including two former deputy chiefs of staff to prime ministers, a former private secretary and speechwriter to two chancellors, and Sir Oliver Robbins who later became the Foreign Office permanent undersecretary. Concern has been expressed that during the course of the project former Hakluyt managing partner Varun Chandra become the prime minister's business and investment adviser.

== See also ==
- Manfred Schlickenrieder
