= Manchester Digital Campus =

High-rise office building in Manchester, England

General information
- Type: High-rise office
- Architectural style: Modern classical
- Location: Manchester, England
- Construction started: June 2026
- Completed: 2032
- Cost: £310 million

Technical details
- Floor count: 8 floors
- Floor area: 900,000 square feet (84,000 m^{2})

Design and construction
- Architect: AtkinsRéalis

Manchester Digital Campus is a planned high-rise office building on Great Ancoats Street in Manchester city centre, England. Designed by AtkinsRéalis, the scheme involves the construction of 900,000 square feet (27 ha) of office space spread over eight floors. The Digital Campus will house Number 10 North after becoming operational in 2032.

== History ==
The site was previously home to Central Retail park opened in 1989 and was bought by Greater Manchester Combined Authority in 2017 for £37 million. In 2021 a campaign group named 'Trees Not Cars' successfully sued Manchester City Council in the High Court. They blocked the council's plans to use the cleared concrete slab as a temporary 440-space car park, arguing it would worsen air pollution near a local primary school. The Government Property Agency (United Kingdom) exchanged contracts with GMCA on the site May 2024 with legal transfer coming in 2025, HM Treasury gave final go ahead for project funding in March 2026.

== Facilities ==
The development will offer two principal buildings, the south building will comprise of seven floors while the north building will top out slightly higher at eight storeys.

== Number 10 North ==
Currently based at Heron House, Number 10 North, established by Andy Burnham upon becoming Prime Minister of the United Kingdom in July 2026, is planned to move to the Digital Campus once operational.

Number 10 North is planned to include offices for the prime minister and the First Secretary of State. Burnham has asked the chief executive of the Greater Manchester Combined Authority to be his deputy chief of staff, leading the new Number 10 North so the Digital campus will house the office of the deputy chief of staff.
