= Varun Chandra =

British political adviser

Varun Chandra (born November 1984) is a British political adviser and former business executive. He was appointed as special adviser on business and investment to the prime minister Keir Starmer in July 2024.

From 2019 to 2024, he was managing partner at Hakluyt & Company and founding chairman of Hakluyt Capital, a venture capital fund.

In December 2025, Chandra was shortlisted to become the UK ambassador to Washington, replacing Peter Mandelson, but was ultimately not selected. He was instead appointed as the UK's special envoy to the United States on trade and investment in addition to his role at Downing Street. Between October 2024 and October 2025, Chandra had private meetings to discuss regulatory changes and artificial intelligence issues with six major US technology companies (Google, Microsoft, Amazon, Oracle, Apple and Meta).

== Business career and industry connections ==
From 2019 to 2024, Chandra was managing partner at Hakluyt & Company and founding chairman of Hakluyt Capital, a venture capital fund. In the Cabinet Office's annual publication of special advisers' interests, the government stated that, where organisations or individuals with whom Chandra had worked closely in previous employment engaged with the government on matters on which he had directly advised them, he disclosed this to the Cabinet Office and it agreed specific mitigations, which could include recusals.

In December 2025, Chandra was shortlisted to become the UK ambassador to Washington, replacing Peter Mandelson, but was ultimately not selected. He was instead appointed as the United Kingdom's special envoy to the United States on trade and investment in addition to his role at Downing Street. The government said that the position included strengthening engagement with US business leaders and supporting trade and inward-investment opportunities.

== Technology policy engagement ==
The Guardian reported that Chandra held 16 meetings with executives from Google, Microsoft, Amazon, Oracle, Apple and Meta between October 2024 and October 2025. According to the newspaper, the meetings covered regulatory changes, artificial intelligence and the second administration of Donald Trump, and took place while the government was seeking investment from Silicon Valley. The report also described his trade-negotiation advice as including AI investment.

The meetings with technology companies were not routinely published because political advisers were not required to declare their interactions with private firms and lobbyists. Rose Zussman of Transparency International said that the meetings raised accountability concerns and described them as "lobbying behind closed doors". A Downing Street spokesperson said that meeting businesses was "a core and entirely expected part" of the prime minister's business adviser's role.

In September 2025, The Guardian reported a potential conflict of interest in connection with Chandra's work on a private-sector solution for Thames Water, which was a client of Hakluyt, in which he retained a shareholding. A Downing Street source said that Chandra had had no personal involvement with Thames Water while at Hakluyt and had made the relevant declarations.
