= Darlington Economic Campus =

British government campus

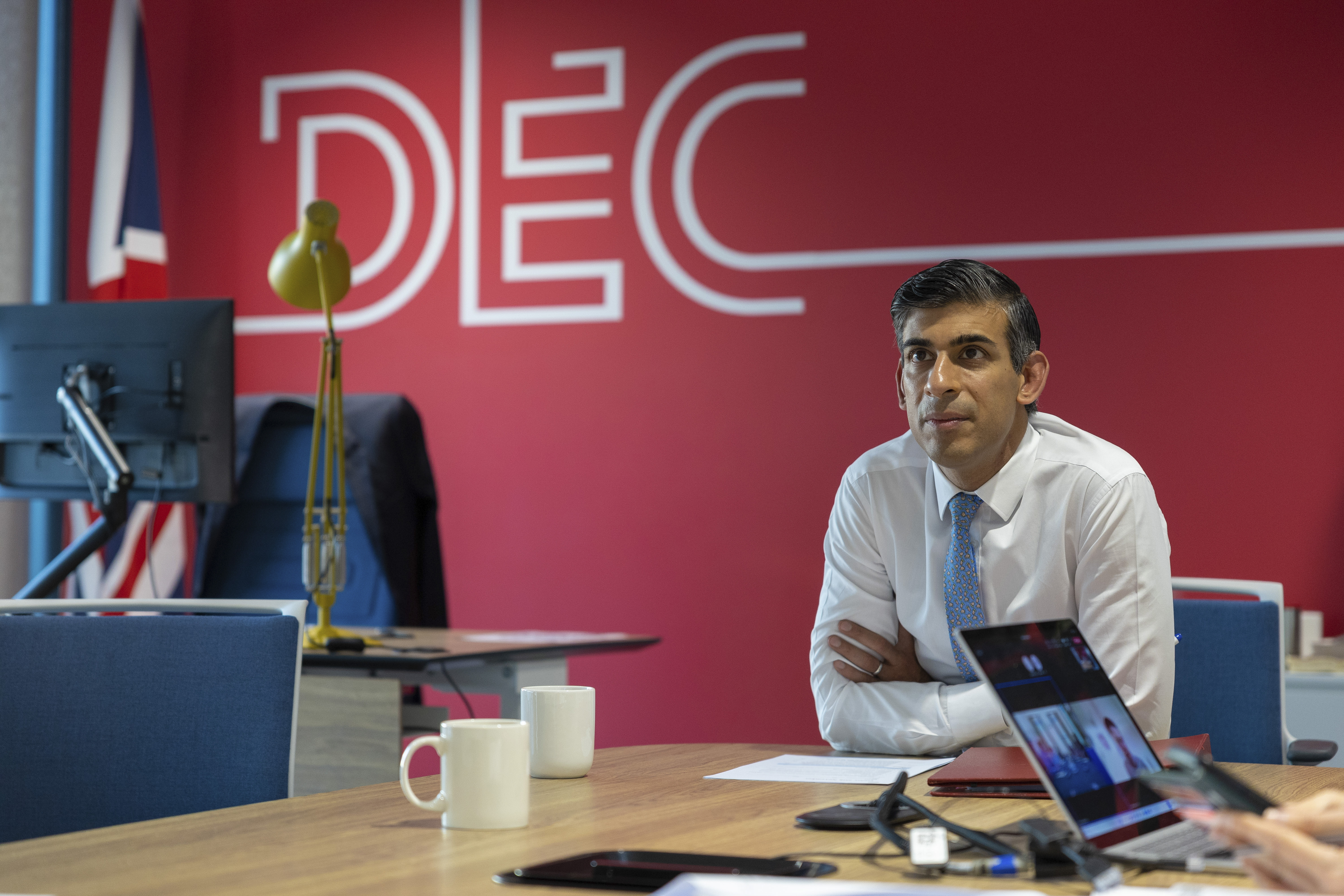
- Prime Minister Rishi Sunak working at the DEC in 2022

Agency overview
- Formed: 2021
- Jurisdiction: UK Government
- Headquarters: Feethams House, Darlington
- Website: www.gov.uk/government/publications/darlington-economic-campus-dec

The Darlington Economic Campus (DEC), dubbed Number 11 North and Treasury North, is a multi-department government hub in Darlington in the North East of England.

== History ==
Darlington was announced as the site of the "Treasury North" by then-chancellor Rishi Sunak in the March 2021 Budget. It was reported that other sites considered were thought to have included Bradford, Leeds and Newcastle.

The Darlington Economic Campus began operating at Feethams House, Darlington, in 2021. By June 2023, around 1300 staff were employed at the DEC (700 from the Department for Education, which has a long-standing presence in Darlington, and 600 from other departments), with a fifth of all HM Treasury staff, including the second permanent secretary, being based there in 2026.

Construction of purpose-built offices for DEC on Brunswick Street, Darlington, began in January 2026 with a ceremonial ground-breaking by then-chancellor Rachel Reeves. These are expected to open in the first quarter of 2028.

== Departments ==
The following UK government departments have a presence at the DEC:

- HM Treasury
- Department for Business and Trade
- Department for Energy Security and Net Zero
- Office of National Statistics
- Competition and Markets Authority
- Department for Education
- Ministry of Housing, Communities and Local Government
- Department for Culture, Media and Sport

== University links ==
DEC has formed links with universities in north-east England. These include collaboration between the Competition and Markets Authority microeconomics unit and the DREAM research centre in Durham University's department of economics, collaboration between the Office for National Statistics and Durham University, policy challenges run for students at Northumbria University and Teesside University by the Department for Culture, Media and Sport and the Ministry of Housing, Communities and Local Government, and a co-created participatory art exhibition with Teesside University. DEC has also worked with Durham University Business School on questions such as how local context is important for achieving national policy objectives and growing the evidence base underpinning place‑based economic analysis.

== See also ==
- Number 10 North
