= Premiership of Andy Burnham =

Government of the United Kingdom since 2026

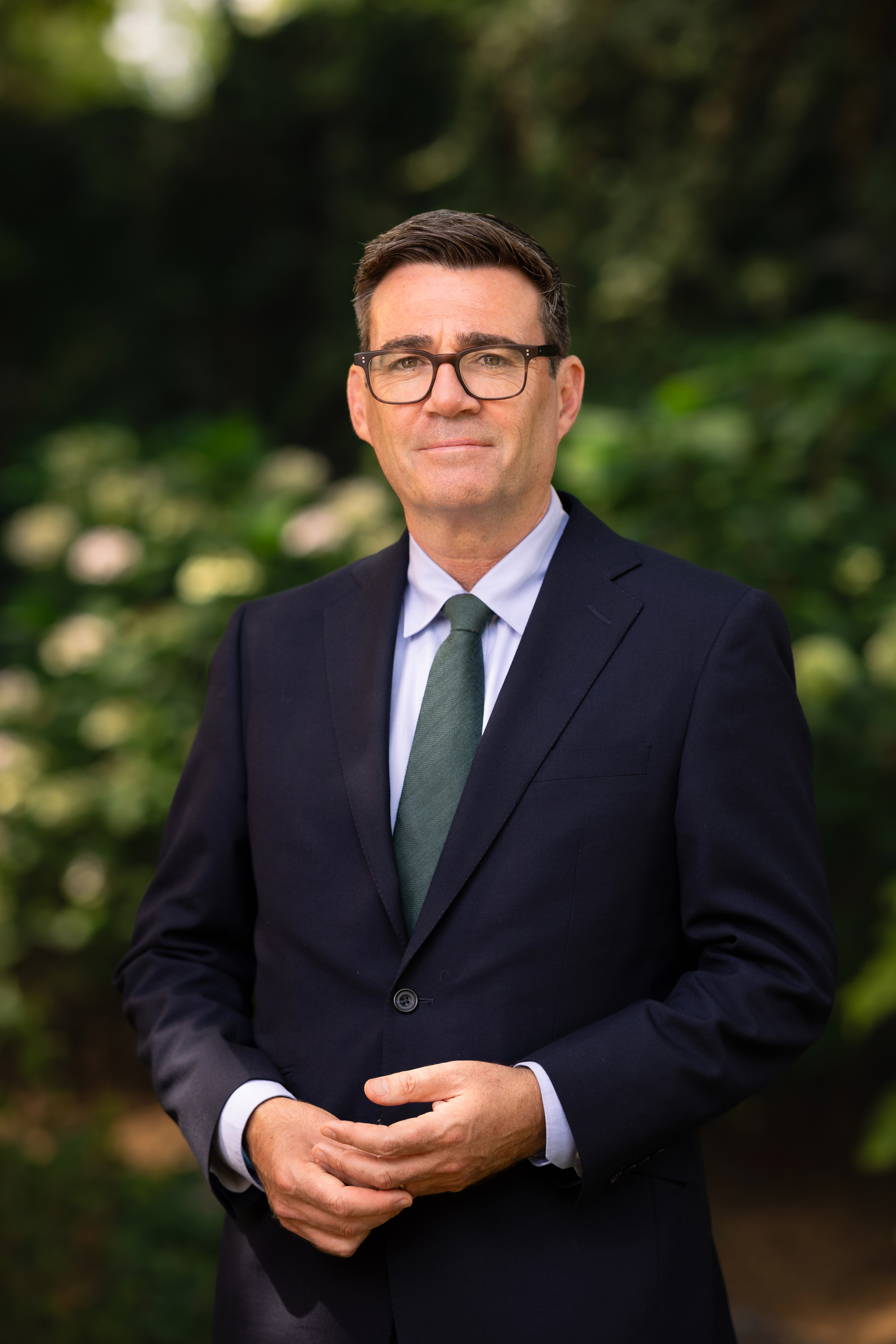
- Official portrait, 2026
- Premiership of Andy Burnham; 20 July 2026 – present
- Monarch: Charles III
- Cabinet: Burnham ministry
- Party: Labour and Co-operative Party
- Seat: 10 Downing Street and Number 10 North
- Coat of Arms of His Majesty's Government

Andy Burnham's tenure as Prime Minister of the United Kingdom began on 20 July 2026 when he accepted an invitation from King Charles III to form a government, succeeding Keir Starmer. Upon taking office, Burnham became the first prime minister to belong to the Labour and Co-operative Party. As prime minister, Burnham concurrently serves as First Lord of the Treasury, Minister for the Civil Service, Minister for the Union and Leader of the Labour Party.

== Background ==
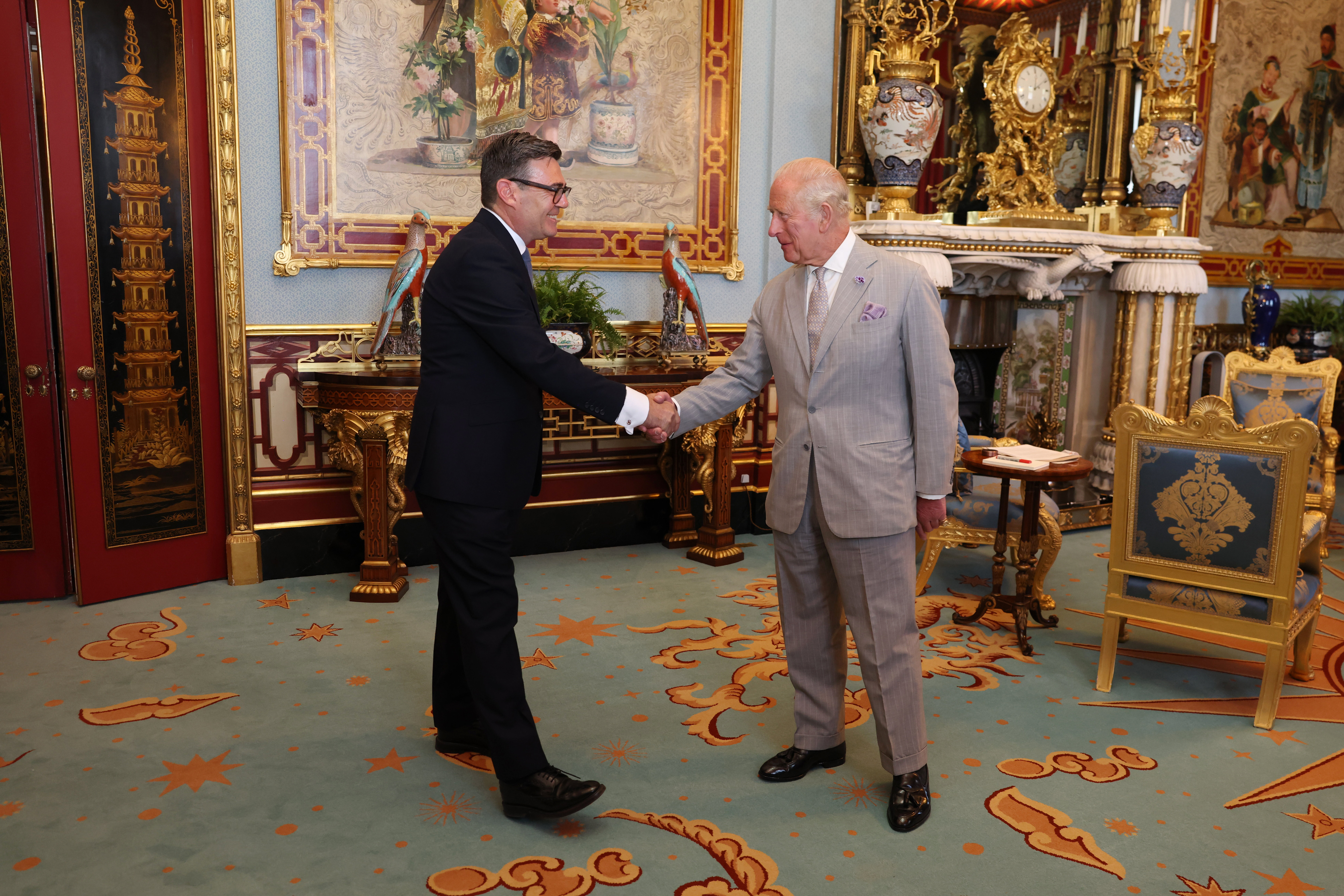
Burnham being received by Charles III at Buckingham Palace to be invited to form a government, in 2026

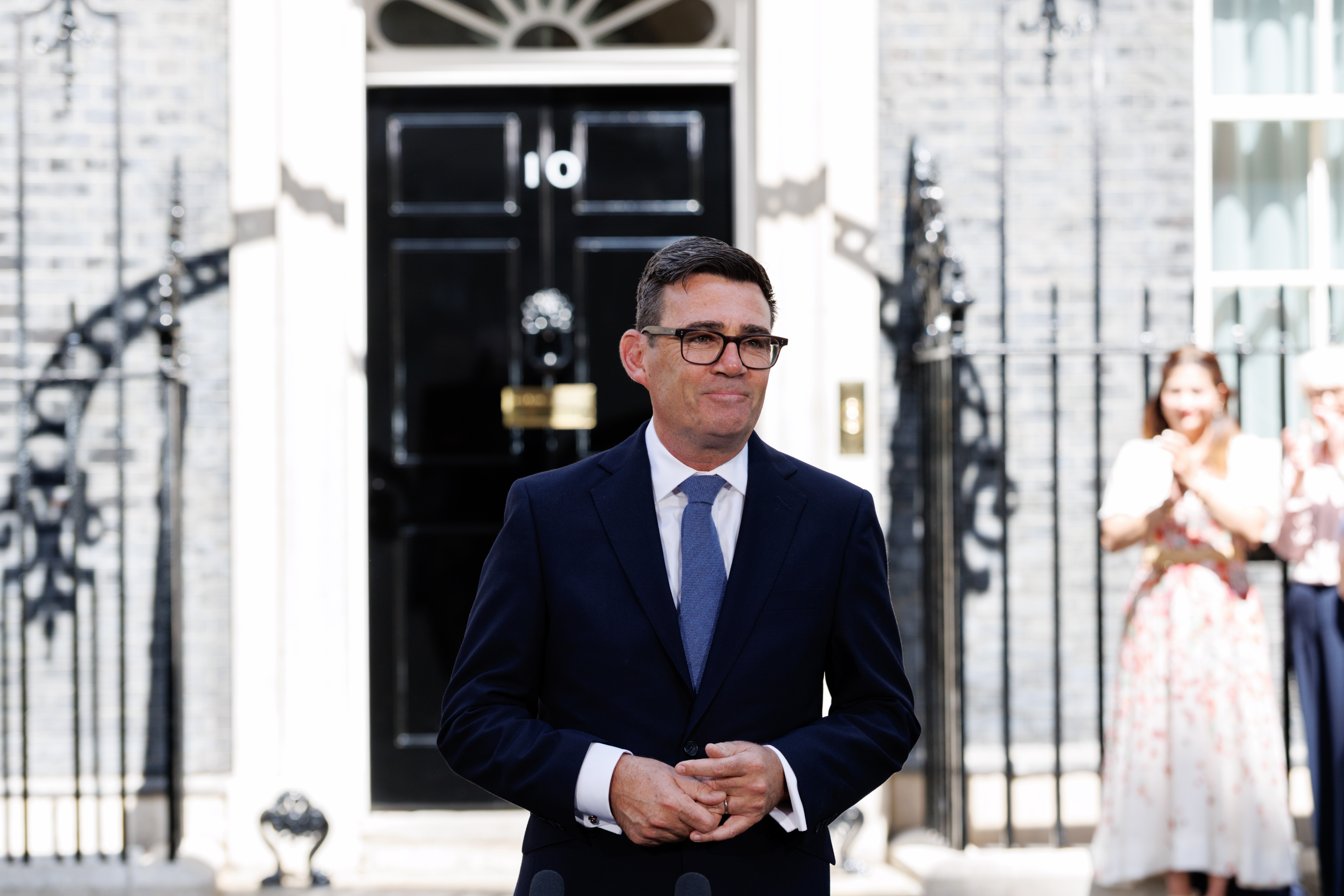
Burnham giving his first speech as Prime Minister

Andy Burnham, who had served as the mayor of Greater Manchester from 2017 to 2026 and previously ran for the Labour leadership in 2010 and 2015, had been tipped since 2025 as a potential leadership challenger to Starmer, but Labour rules dictate that only MPs can stand for the leadership. Burnham won the 2026 Makerfield by-election on 18 June after the constituency's MP, Josh Simons, resigned to allow Burnham to stand. Burnham's by-election victory intensified discussion of a leadership challenge; Starmer announced his resignation four days after the by-election, on the same day that Burnham was sworn in as an MP. Nominations from MPs opened on 9 July and closed on 15 July. Burnham received 379 nominations and was the only eligible candidate, as he was nominated by over 80% of all Labour MPs.

At a final total of 94%, Burnham received the highest amount of MP nominations ever recorded in a modern Labour leadership contest, exceeding Gordon Brown who received 88% of nominations in 2007. He became the Leader of the Labour Party on 17 July 2026, and assumed the role of Prime Minister three days later, on 20 July 2026. Upon taking office, Burnham became the first prime minister to belong to the Co-operative Party. At the end of July 2026, Bev Craig won the 2026 Greater Manchester mayoral by-election.

== Ministry ==
Burnham started to form his cabinet on 20 July 2026, following the King accepting Starmer's resignation as prime minister and the King being informed Burnham can command the confidence of the House of Commons and appointing him prime minister, after his unopposed election as Labour leader. Prior to him beginning to form the cabinet, Burnham was nearly completely silent on the members of his cabinet, leading to widespread media speculation of who it would contain, in particular the post of Chancellor of the Exchequer.

There were major reshuffles to the cabinet, including the departures of Chancellor Rachel Reeves, Deputy Prime Minister and Justice Secretary David Lammy, Housing Secretary Steve Reed, Attorney General Lord Hermer and key minister, chief secretary to the prime minister, Chancellor of the Duchy of Lancaster and Minister for Intergovernmental Relations Darren Jones.

In the run-up to his confirmation as Labour leader and prime minister, Burnham promised to stick to the 2024 Labour manifesto and the fiscal rules set out by Starmer ministry Chancellor Rachel Reeves, meaning he will need to ensure the budget is balanced, possibly restricting government spending on his plans.

== Domestic policy ==
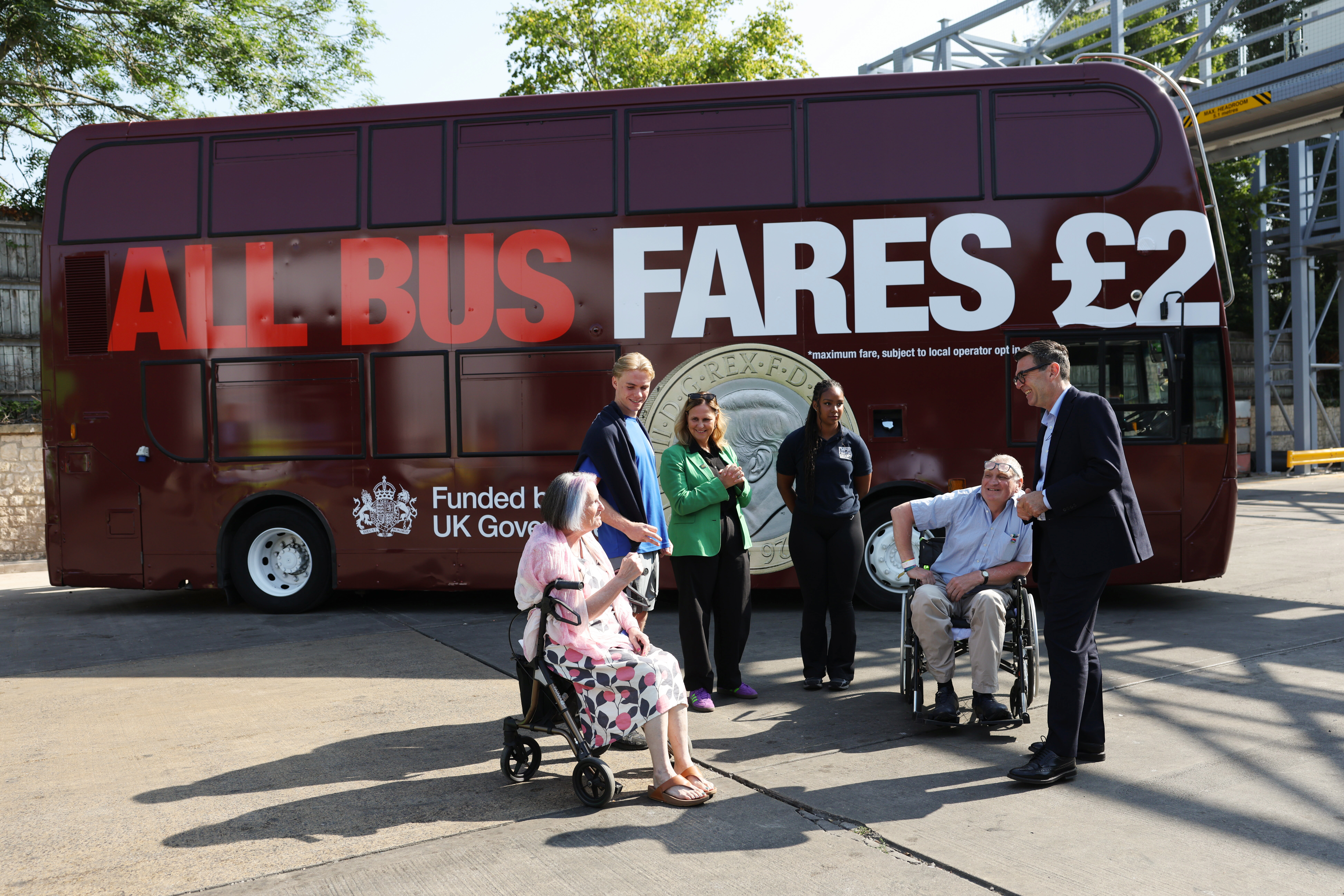
Burnham visits First Bus's Bath Depot, 2026

In his first speech as prime minister, Burnham mentioned re-industrialisation, mitigating the cost-of-living crisis, reforming education, building council homes and ending homelessness as priorities.

He pledged an additional £340 million over the course of three years "to finally end long-term rough sleeping across the UK". He outlined his desire to work cross party, to reform the social care system.

=== Cost of living ===
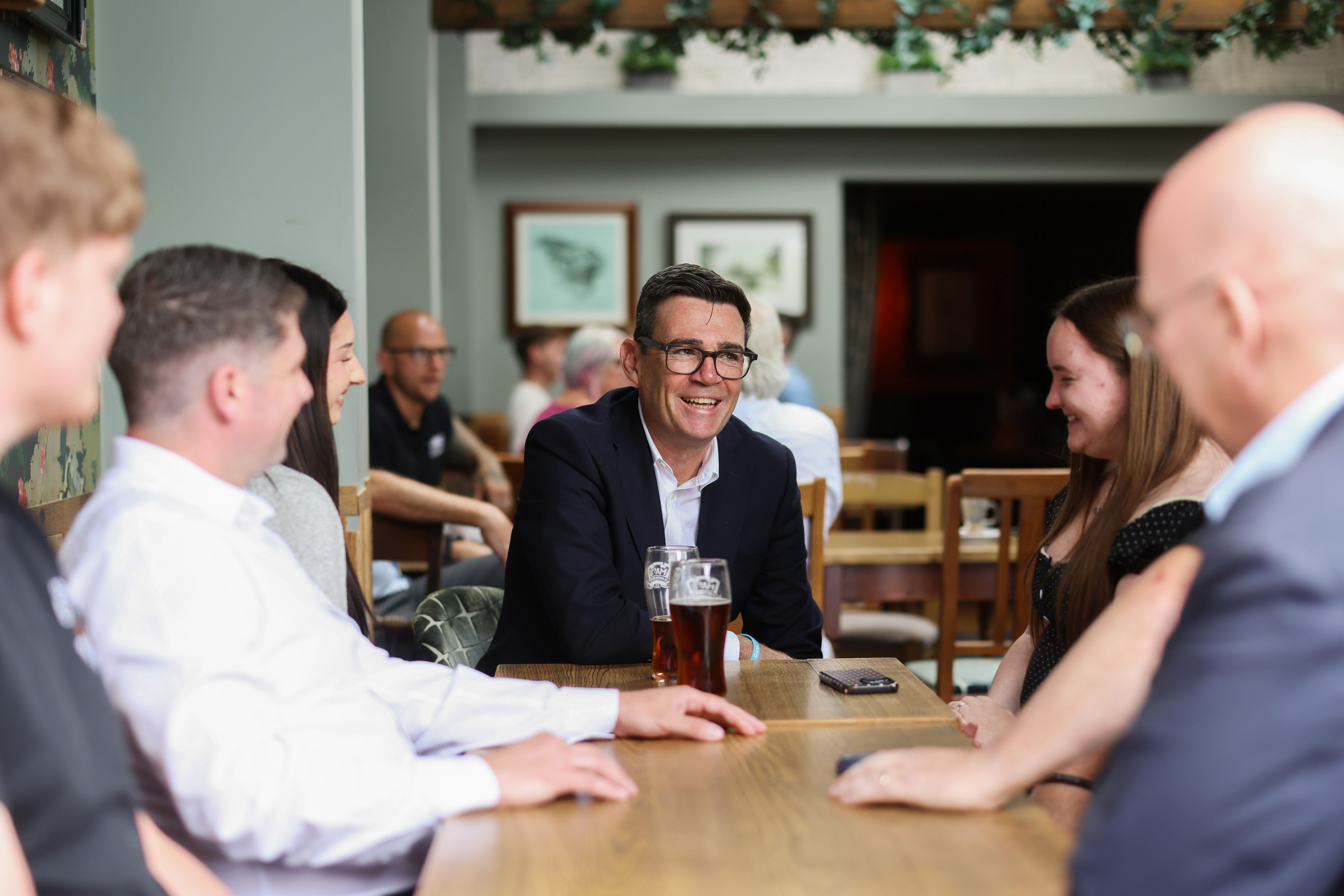
Burnham announcing a 20 percent cut in business rates for pubs, clubs and live music venues at The Hare pub in Harlow, July 2026

Burnham scheduled the removal of the 5% value-added tax on household electricity bills in England, Scotland and Wales for six months, to commence in October 2026. The government has claimed the policy will be funded with savings from scrapping Starmer's planned digital ID scheme. The cut will not apply in Northern Ireland, where European Union VAT rates apply; instead, the Northern Irish government will be allocated its own funding for cost-of-living measures.

Burnham scheduled a 20% reduction of business rates for all but the most successful pubs, clubs and live music venues in England for April 2027.

From January to December 2027, bus fares in England outside London are to be capped at £2. The cap was £3 when Burnham became prime minister. Burnham has also said that he will remove the 9:30 am time limit on disabled person bus passes from April 2027. The devolved governments are to be allocated money for corresponding fare reductions. About £400 million of the scheme's expected cost (more than £500 million) is to be funded by turning international climate-related donations into loans.

=== Criminal justice ===
Burnham paused the Sentencing Act 2026's prisoner early release scheme in England and Wales, scheduled for September 2026, so it could be reviewed. After changes were made to the rules, in October 2026 eligible prisoners began to be released.

=== Number 10 North ===
Along with still working at the prime minister's traditional office at 10 Downing Street in London, Burnham established Number 10 North, an office at Heron House in Manchester; both locations were grouped together under a new Office for the Prime Minister and the Cabinet, overseen by Louise Haigh, First Secretary of State. Burnham is expected to work at Number 10 North at least one day per week, barring scheduling conflicts. Relocation packages to work at Number 10 North have been offered to civil servants based in London.

== Foreign policy ==
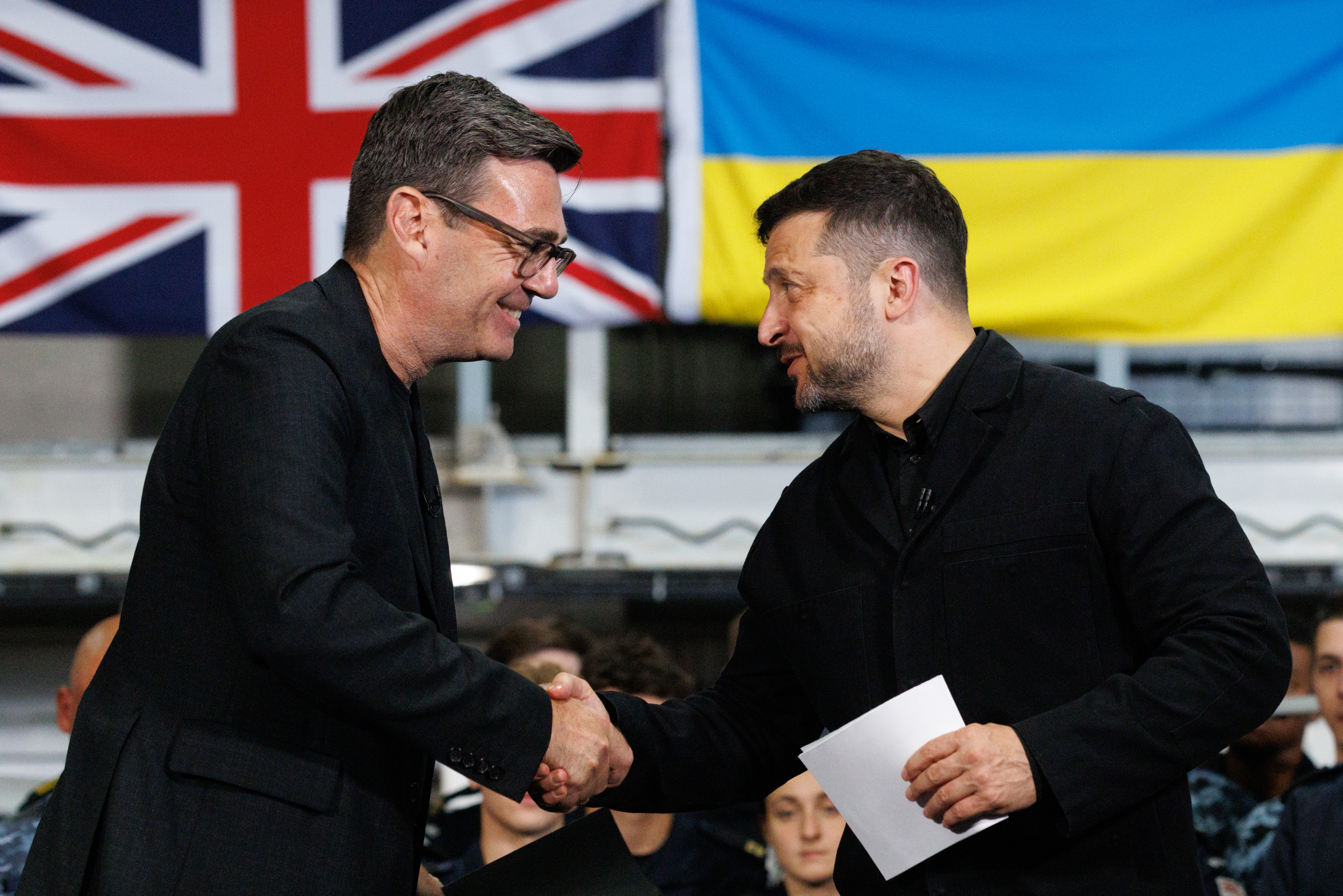
Burnham with Ukraine President Volodymyr Zelenskyy, July 2026

Burnham held introductory phone calls with United States president Donald Trump, Ukrainian president Volodymyr Zelenskyy, and European Commission President Ursula von der Leyen shortly after taking office on 20 July 2026. In his first official international conversation, Burnham congratulated President Trump on successfully hosting the World Cup tournament, outlined plans for British reindustrialisation, and extended an invitation to visit Manchester. He pledged that the security of the UK and its allies was of highest priority, whilst President Trump discussed the Middle East, with Burnham confirming the UK would continue to work to keep shipping routes open in the Strait of Hormuz, in line with objectives to reduce costs for people and businesses in the UK. During his subsequent dialogue with President Zelenskyy, Burnham reaffirmed that the United Kingdom's diplomatic, military, and political backing for Ukraine amidst the Russian invasion remains steadfast and unchanged under his new government. To conclude his initial round of foreign diplomacy, Burnham spoke with Ursula von der Leyen to express a desire to build a closer and more ambitious relationship with the European Union, resulting in an agreement for their respective teams to coordinate a UK–EU summit.

In October 2026, Burnham said that upon becoming Prime Minister, he had asked if Russia had "interfered" with the Brexit referendum and was told that they had attempted to influence the outcome, but no further details or evidence were disclosed. A National Centre for Information Defence is being established to counteract disinformation campaigns by hostile states. Burnham has shown a desire to form closer ties with the EU and improve the agreements in place and stated in October 2026 that the public will have significant say over the future of the relationship with the EU, with the UK–EU summit scheduled for the 20th November 2026.

== Leadership and party approval ==
Within days of becoming Prime Minister, Burnham had higher approval ratings than his predecessor had achieved. Labour has reportedly improved in opinion polls, which has been described as the "Burnham bounce", by the media.

== International visits ==
As of November 2026, Burnham has made six international trips, to seven countries, during his premiership:

- One visit to Ukraine, the United States, Antigua and Barbuda, Turkey, Ireland, and Belgium.
- Two visits to Germany.

British premierships
Preceded by Starmer	Burnham premiership 2026–incumbent	Incumbent
