= 2026 Labour Party leadership crisis =

Political event in the United Kingdom

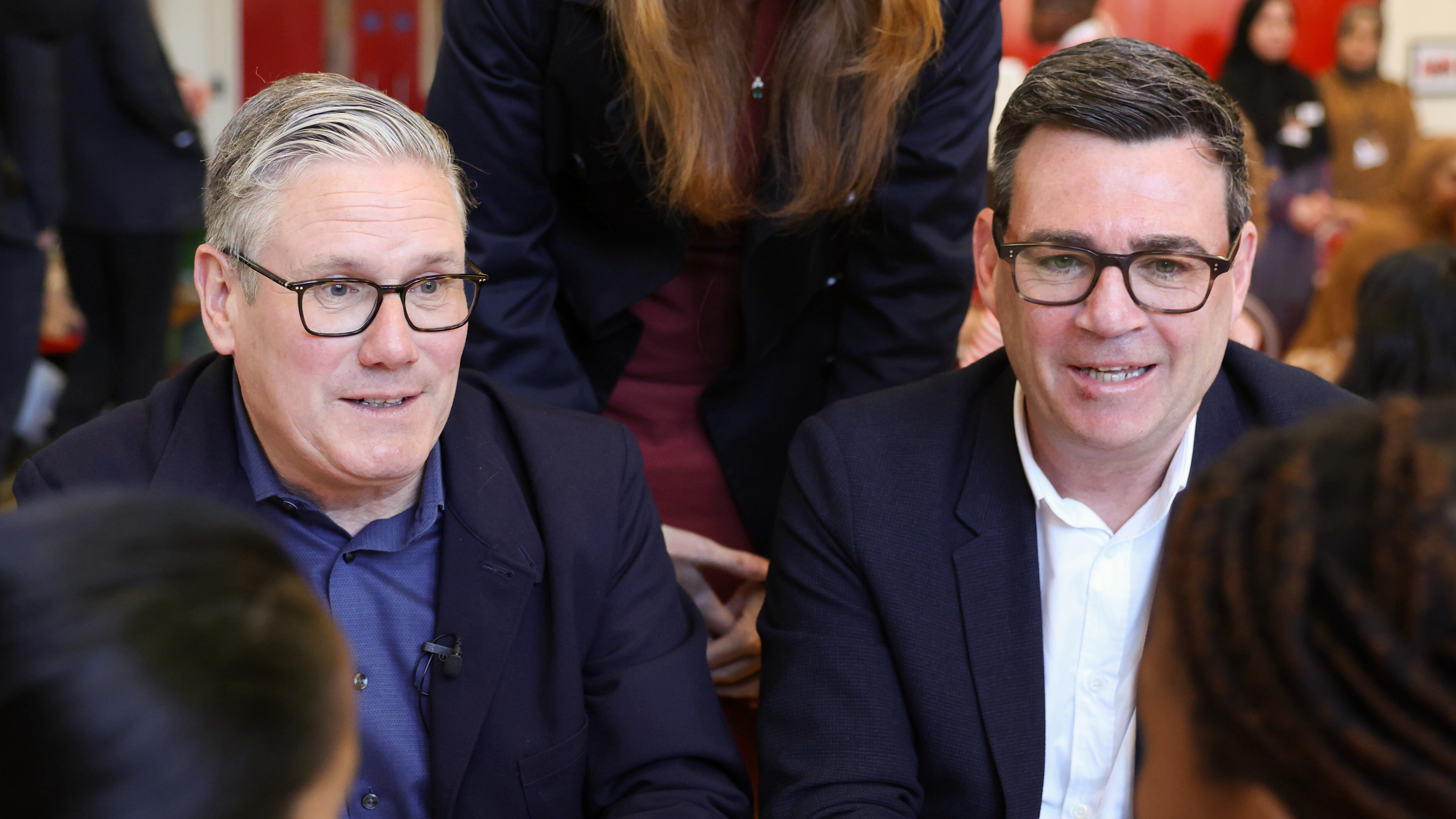
- Andy Burnham (right) stood as a candidate in the Labour Party leadership election and won the office, caused by the resignation of Keir Starmer (left).
- Date: 7 May 2026 – 22 June 2026
- Cause: See Background
- Motive: Pressure Keir Starmer to resign; Instigate a new Labour leadership election
- Participants: Labour MPs; Labour affiliate trade unions; Labour Party members
- Outcome: Resignation of Keir Starmer; 2026 Labour Party leadership election

In 2026, a leadership crisis emerged within the Labour Party amid public and internal party dissatisfaction with Keir Starmer, the prime minister of the United Kingdom, and his government. It led to Starmer announcing his resignation on 22 June; he was replaced by Andy Burnham as leader on 17 July, and as Prime Minister on 20 July.

Labour's poor results in the local elections in May 2026 and discontent over policy led to calls for Starmer to resign as leader, and to the resignation of several members of the government, including Health Secretary Wes Streeting on 14 May. Also on 14 May, Josh Simons resigned as the MP for Makerfield to allow Burnham to contest a by-election to be able to stand for leader. On 11 June 2026, following disputes over the government's planned defence spending, Defence Secretary John Healey and Armed Forces minister Al Carns also resigned.

Following Burnham's victory in Makerfield and calls for an immediate leadership challenge by Labour MPs, Starmer initially intended to contest a potential leadership challenge, but eventually decided to step down, and announced his resignation on 22 June 2026. Nominations for a leadership election opened on 9 July and closed on 16 July. After all other reported candidates declined to stand, Burnham received nominations from more than 90% of Labour MPs and a sufficient number of party affiliates by 15 July, and was therefore elected unopposed. He became Labour leader on 17 July and Prime Minister on 20 July.

== Background ==
The Labour Party won the 2024 general election with a landslide majority of 172 seats, ousting the Conservatives after 14 years in office. Starmer became the fifth Labour leader to become Prime Minister after a general election but with the smallest share of the electoral vote (33.7%) of any majority government since the Second World War.

Starmer was viewed unfavourably by the British public throughout his tenure as prime minister. His net approval rating began slightly positive, falling over the course of his premiership to an average of −46% by November 2025. By the end of 2025, opinion polls rated Starmer as one of Britain's most unpopular prime ministers, drawing comparisons to Liz Truss.

=== Opposition to government policies ===
In September 2024, YouGov reported that 67% of people had a negative view of the government's immigration policies while 16% had a positive view, 64% of people said the government were managing the health service badly and 70% of people were against the government's decision to release prisoners early to ease prison capacity. By September 2025, 14% of people approved of the government's record while 69% disapproved. Roughly two-thirds of people believed the Labour Party was out of touch, unclear of what they stood for, weak, and untrustworthy.

77% of people did not trust Labour to keep its promises, or help the cost of living crisis. By January 2026, YouGov believed 75% of people had an unfavourable opinion of Starmer, a net favourability rating of −57, only matched by Truss. Luke Tryl of polling company More in Common said that Starmer had "become a vessel for people's frustration with the system."

In March 2026, Unite the Union, one of the largest trade unions, cut their Labour affiliation by 40% because of "Labour's incompetent behaviour" in response to the Birmingham bin strike.

According to The Week, other major challenges to the government's policies included the winter fuel payment U-turn, National Insurance increase, and the U-turn on welfare spending.

=== Poor electoral performance ===
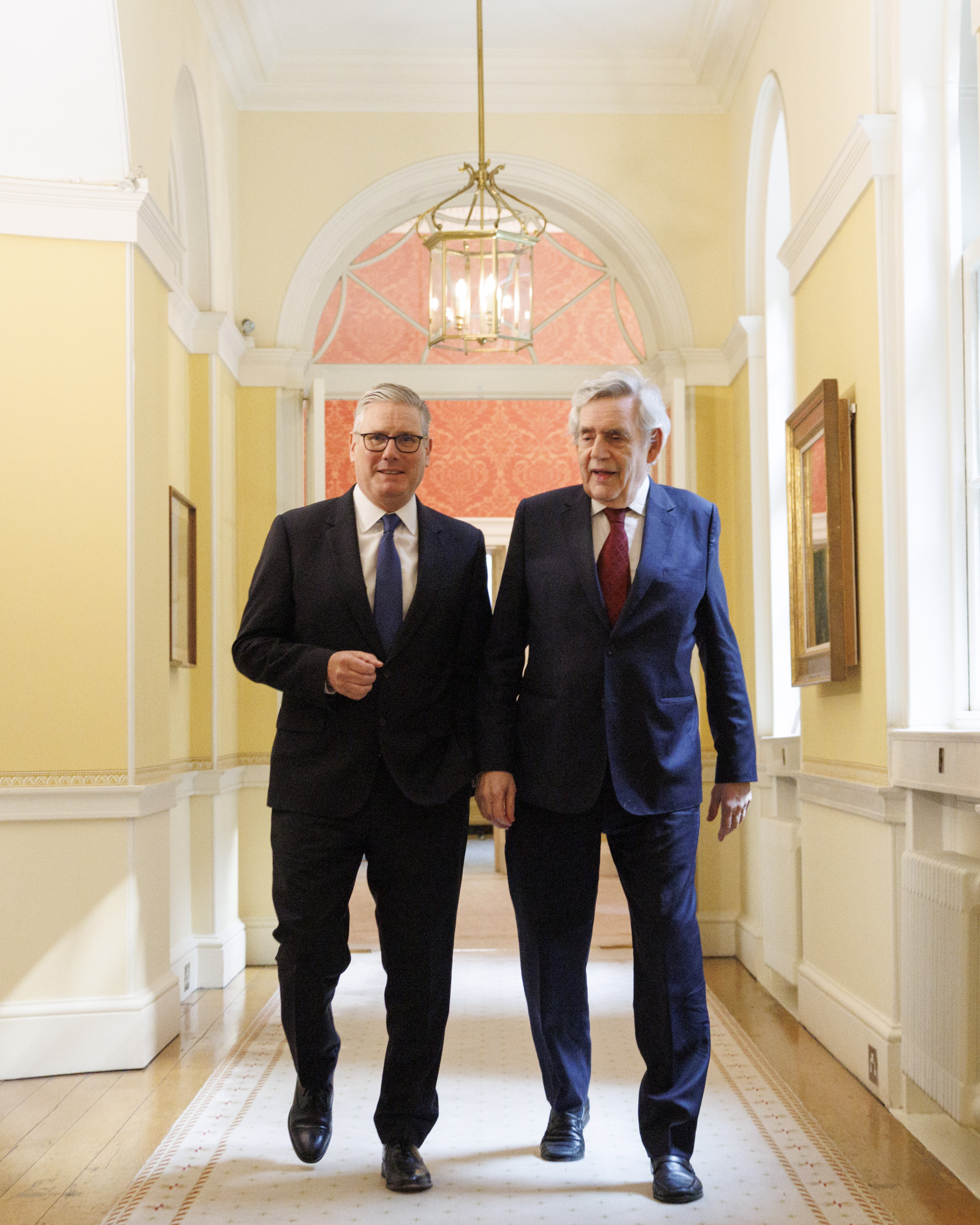
Starmer appointed former prime minister Gordon Brown to an advisory role in government in an attempt to reset his premiership.

The most popular Labour politician and leadership hopeful Andy Burnham, the mayor of Greater Manchester, attempted to run for parliament at the 2026 Gorton and Denton by-election, but was blocked by Labour's National Executive Committee. Hannah Spencer of the Green Party won and flipped the seat, with Labour coming third. Burnham previously defeated Spencer in the 2024 Greater Manchester mayoral election, and she acknowledged Burnham's local popularity, stating that if he had been the candidate, Spencer would have faced a "harder fight".

In February 2026, ahead of the 2026 Scottish parliament election, Scottish Labour leader Anas Sarwar publicly called for Starmer to resign, calling his leadership a distraction. At the 2026 Senedd election, Welsh Labour suffered a massive defeat which ended 100 years of Labour control of Wales, relegating them to third place behind the governing Plaid Cymru and the opposition Reform UK Wales, with their leader, Eluned Morgan, becoming the first sitting head of government to lose their seat in an election in British history.

At the 2026 local elections, Labour lost control of 35 councils and nearly 1,500 councillors (roughly 60% of seats up for election). The BBC's projected national vote share indicated that Labour would receive 17% of the vote if the local elections had taken place across the whole country, in joint third with the Conservatives and down nearly half from the general election. Following the result, Starmer appointed former prime minister Gordon Brown and Labour peer Harriet Harman to advisory roles in government in an attempt to reset his premiership. However, the BBC reported that Labour MPs were dissatisfied with the appointment, with one saying, "Not sure voters in Wigan, Wandsworth, Salford or Sunderland voted Reform because they thought we needed more advisers from a different era of Labour politics. I think this shows that Keir doesn't even understand the problem, never mind the solution." However, opinion polling conducted in the wake of the 2026 local elections has shown that in England just 5% of those who voted Labour in the 2024 general election switched to Reform, while 32% switched to the Greens or the Lib Dems.

=== Mandelson appointment scandal ===
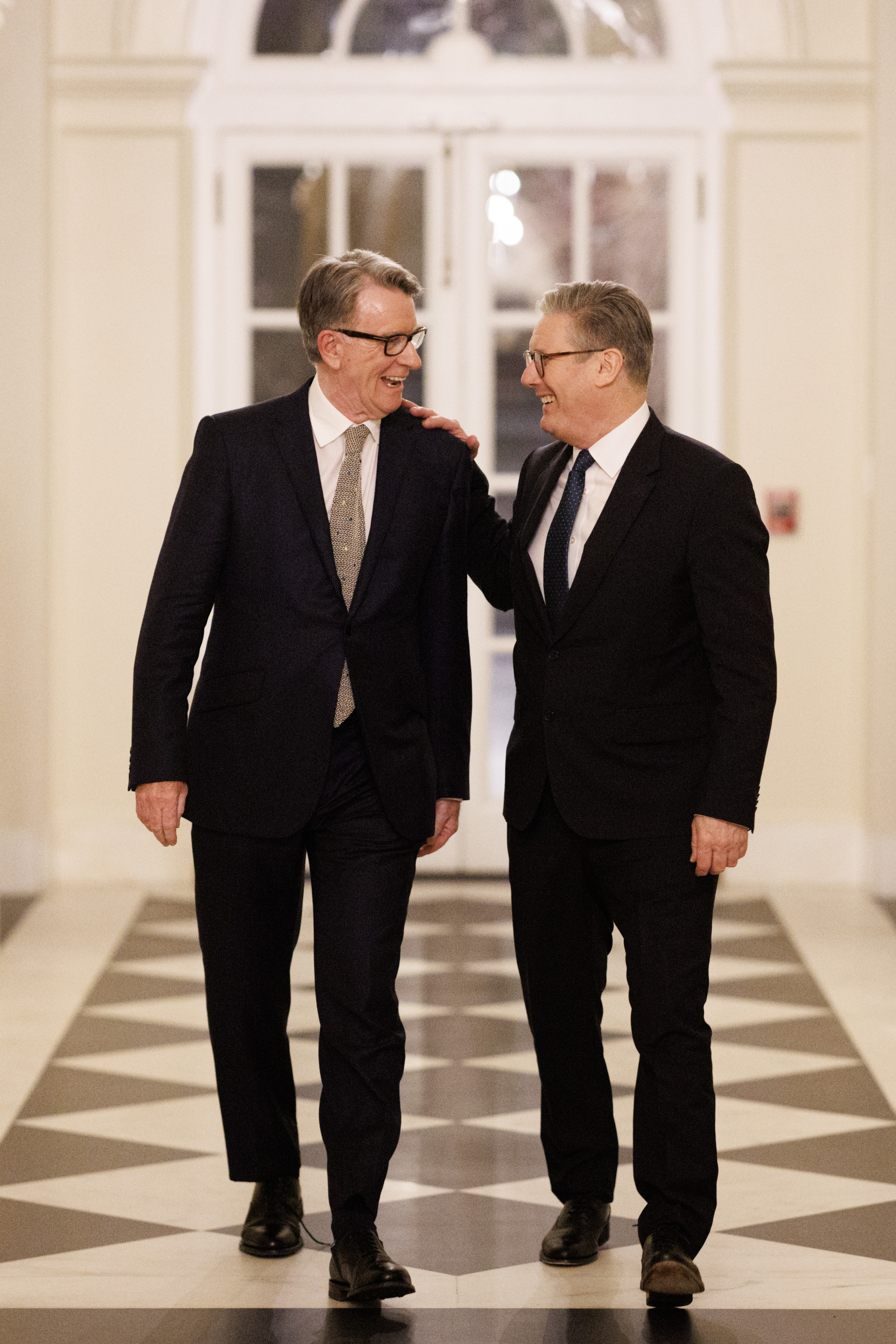
Peter Mandelson and Starmer at the White House in February 2025

In December 2024, the government announced prominent New Labour figure Peter Mandelson's appointment as the British ambassador to the United States to strengthen their relationship with the incoming Trump administration. In September 2025, the extent of Mandelson's relationship with convicted child sex offender Jeffrey Epstein became widely understood as the Epstein files were released. Starmer dismissed Mandelson, and said that he regretted appointing him. The prime minister's Chief of Staff and long-time Starmer ally Morgan McSweeney took responsibility for the appointment and resigned in February 2026. Tim Allan, the Director of Communications, resigned the following day.

In April 2026, it was reported that Mandelson had been denied security clearance by security vetting in January 2025. A government spokesperson said "the decision to grant developed vetting to Peter Mandelson against the recommendation of UK Security Vetting was taken by officials in the FCDO". Starmer said he was not told that Mandelson had failed security vetting, and denied claims that he had misled the House of Commons. Foreign Secretary Yvette Cooper dismissed the most senior civil servant in the Foreign Office, Olly Robbins. Robbins told the Foreign Affairs Select Committee that he had been put under "serious pressure" to push through the appointment. Leader of the Opposition Kemi Badenoch called Starmer's position "untenable", while the scandal prompted other party leaders to call for Starmer's resignation.

== Timeline ==
=== Calls for Starmer to resign ===
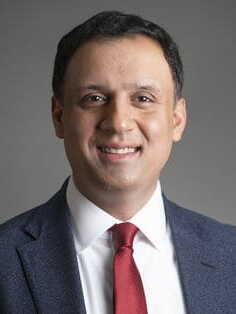
Anas Sarwar publicly called for Starmer to resign, becoming one of the first Labour politicians to do so.

On 9 February 2026, amid the Mandelson scandal, Anas Sarwar held a press conference in Glasgow to publicly call for Starmer to resign, becoming one of the first Labour politicians to do so. Sarwar argued that his primary loyalty was to Scotland and that Starmer's continued leadership was sabotaging the party's future.

Senior Cabinet members including Deputy Prime Minister David Lammy and Chancellor Rachel Reeves rallied behind Starmer, emphasising his mandate and urging party unity. Within Scottish Labour, the move caused significant friction; while Monica Lennon supported Sarwar, others like former Scottish Secretary Ian Murray branded the call a threat to party stability. Party leaders John Swinney and Russell Findlay characterised the situation as "opportunism" and a "meltdown". Addressing the Parliamentary Labour Party that evening, Starmer remained defiant, stating he had "won every fight I've ever been in", and refused to walk away.

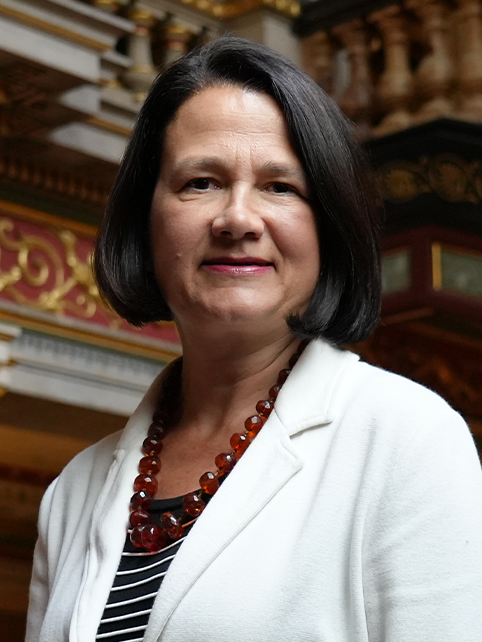
Catherine West requested Starmer set out a timetable for his departure.

On 7 May local elections in England, Scottish Parliament, and Welsh Senedd elections were held, the results were some of the worst ever for Labour, with them receiving about 17% in England, 19% in Scotland, and 11% in Wales. In Wales this was the first election (counting general and Senedd elections) where Labour lost since 1922. The main parties which they lost support to were the Green Party, Reform UK, and Plaid Cymru in Wales.

In reaction to these elections, several backbench Labour MPs were vocal in their disappointment. Debbie Abrahams believed it would be a matter of months before Starmer would step down as prime minister, and Clive Betts said the prime minister should step down in the not-too-distant future. Starmer, in an interview with The Observer, said: "I want 10 years in No 10 and will fight my challengers." On 9 May, former Foreign Office junior minister Catherine West said that she would launch a leadership challenge against Starmer if the cabinet did not move against him. She needed nominations from 81 MPs (20% of the parliamentary party) to start a leadership election, although she said she did not wish to stand, leading some to label her a stalking horse. She later clarified that she was requesting the prime minister to "set out a timetable for his departure". In a move that The Guardian described as "bizarre", West said on 14 May that if a leadership contest did happen, she might support Starmer anyway.

=== Starmer speech and initial resignations ===
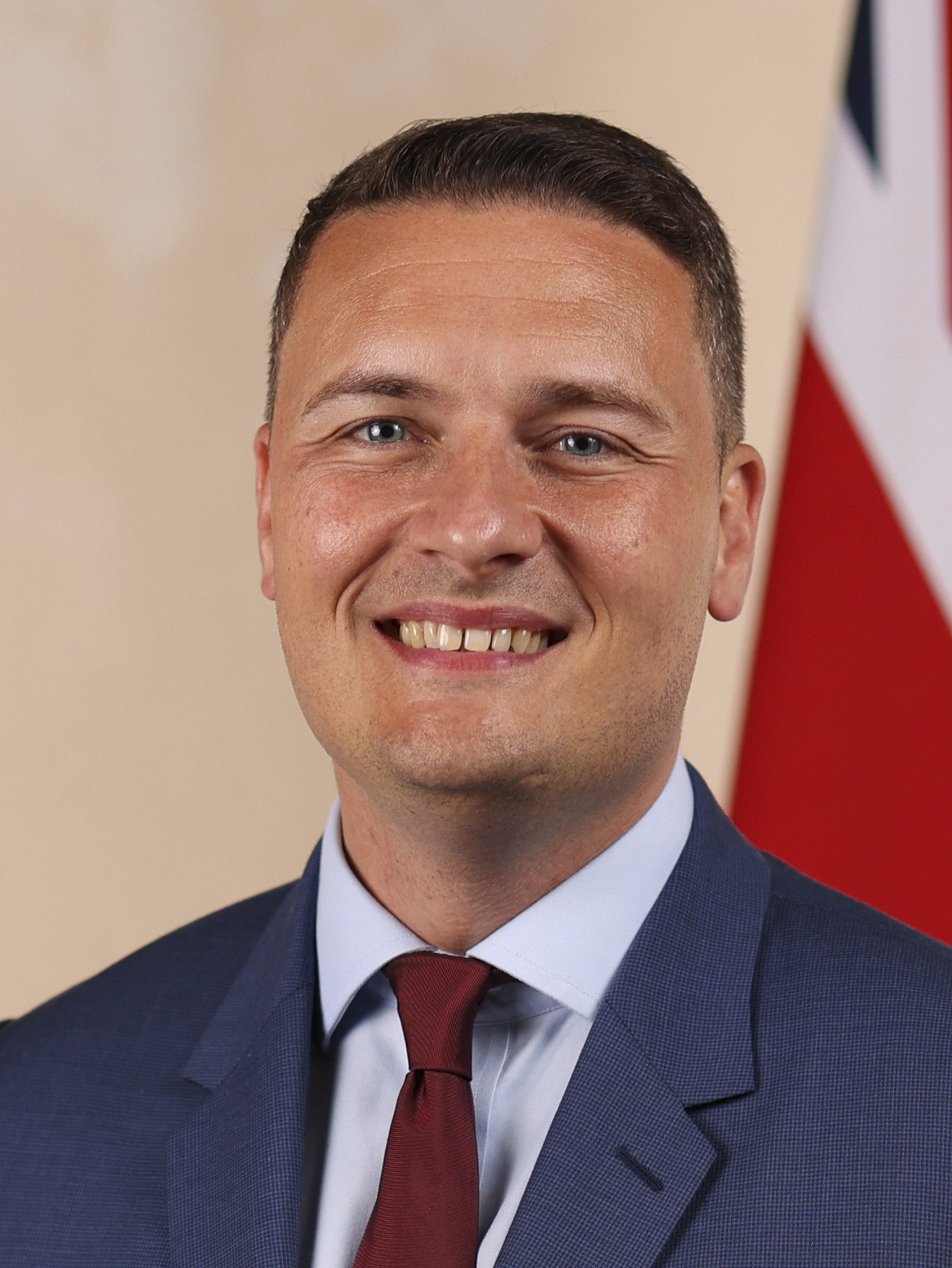
Wes Streeting resigned as health secretary and was highly critical of Starmer's leadership in his resignation letter.

On the morning of 11 May, Starmer held a press conference that was reported by The Guardian as his "final chance to save his premiership". Reflecting on the local election results and his own position, Starmer said: "I'm not going to stand here and pretend this isn't a tough moment for our party, or that we didn't take a bruising at the ballot box. But let me be perfectly clear about my position: I am not running away from the challenge, nor am I going to change course because the political weather has turned. My position is, and will remain, completely fixed on the long-term renewal of this country, regardless of the short-term political cost.". While this conference bought Starmer a temporary reprieve from an immediate formal challenge, it did not stop the internal pressure on his leadership as political analysts and internal Labour MPs widely deemed the execution ineffective. By 11 May 2026, around eighty Labour MPs had called on Starmer to set a date for his departure. Four parliamentary private secretaries resigned following the speech: Tom Rutland, Joe Morris, Melanie Ward, and Naushabah Khan. Sally Jameson, another PPS, did not resign but called on Starmer to go.

There were reports that four cabinet ministers had urged Starmer to go, including Home Secretary Shabana Mahmood and Foreign Secretary Yvette Cooper. Defenders of the prime minister such as Angela Eagle said that days before the state opening of parliament on 13 May was "not the time for destabilisation".

On 12 May, four junior ministers resigned from the government: Miatta Fahnbulleh (the Minister for Devolution, Faith and Communities), Jess Philips (the Minister of Safeguarding), Alex Davies-Jones (the Victims Minister), and Zubir Ahmed (a Minister of Health). Philips said in her resignation statement, "The desire not to have an argument means we rarely make an argument, leaving opportunities for progress stalled and delayed." On 12 May 2026, appointments were made to replace ministers who had resigned during the day.

On 14 May 2026, Secretary of State for Health and Social Care Wes Streeting resigned from the cabinet. In his resignation letter, while praising his own achievements in the role, Streeting strongly criticised Starmer's leadership, stating that he had lost confidence in him and that it would be "dishonourable and unprincipled" to remain in the cabinet. Rosie Wrighting also resigned as private secretary in the Department of Health.

=== Defence spending disputes ===
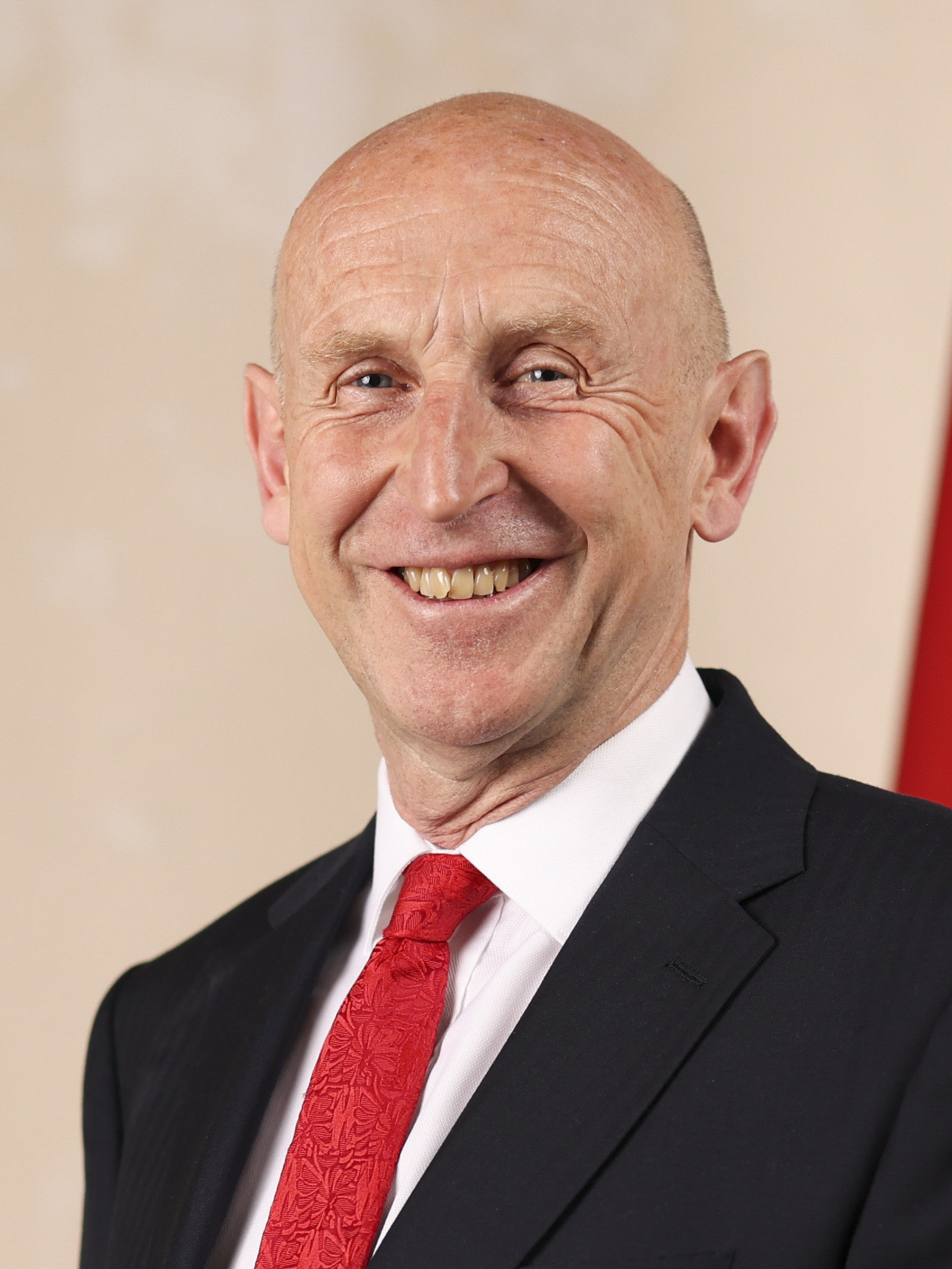
John Healey resigned as defence secretary over disagreements with the government's defence spending plans.

On 11 June 2026, Secretary of State for Defence John Healey resigned from the cabinet, citing disagreements with the government's defence spending plans. In his resignation letter, he argued that the Defence Investment Plan agreed by the Treasury was insufficient to meet the United Kingdom's strategic defence objectives, that the settlement delayed necessary investment and risked leaving the armed forces under-resourced amid increasing international threats, including the 2022 Russian invasion of Ukraine and the 2026 Iran war. He stated that because Starmer was "unable" and the Treasury "unwilling" to match the funding required, he was left with no option but to step down.

Numerous media outlets reported the resignation of Healey as shock and sudden, and reported the substantial impact it would have on Starmer's premiership.

Also on 11 June, Al Carns, the Armed Forces minister, and two Ministry of Defence Parliamentary private secretaries, Rachel Hopkins and Pamela Nash, also resigned over disagreements with the defence investment plan.

=== Makerfield by-election ===
On 18 June 2026, a by-election was held in Makerfield after sitting MP Josh Simons resigned to allow Andy Burnham, Mayor of Greater Manchester to stand for a seat in Parliament. Possession of a parliamentary seat then permitted Burnham to challenge Prime Minister Keir Starmer's leadership position. It was the first time since the 1965 Leyton by-election that a by-election had been caused specifically to provide a vacancy for a person not currently in Parliament.

Burnham won the by-election with almost 25,000 votes and a majority of over 9,200 votes, exceeding expectations from opinion polls which projected that he would win by a narrow margin over Reform UK. In the event, Reform considerably underperformed compared with its showing in the 2026 local elections, while tactical squeezing of the Liberal Democrat and Green Party vote was considered to help Burnham.

Burnham's victory returned him to the House of Commons on 22 June for the first time since 2017 and made him eligible to stand in any Labour leadership contest.

=== Starmer's resignation ===
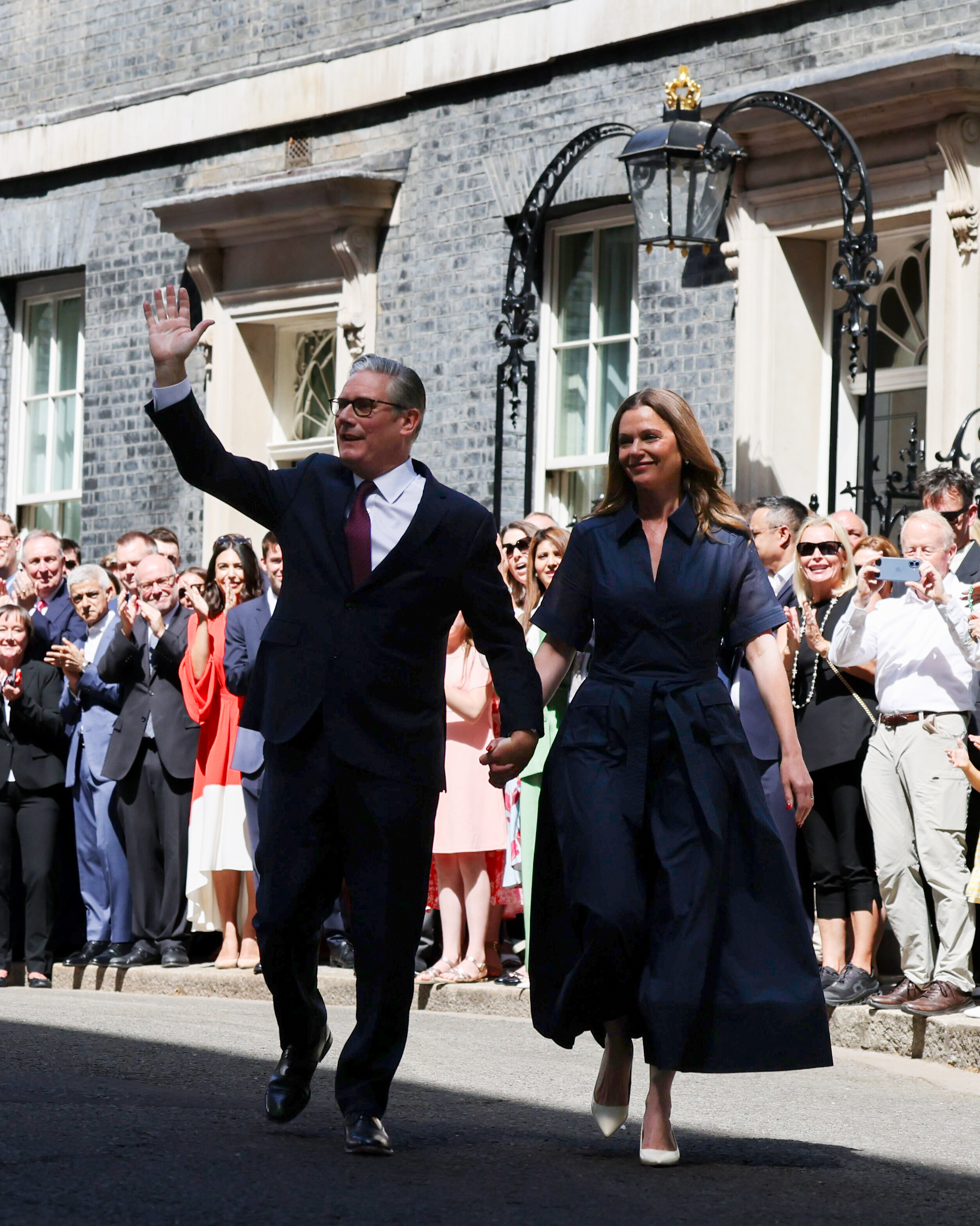
Keir Starmer with his wife Victoria leaving 10 Downing Street for the final time before Andy Burnham became the new prime minister

On Sunday 21 June, British media was widely reporting that Starmer was expected to resign the next day. On Monday 22 June 2026, Starmer announced his resignation as Prime Minister and leader of the Labour Party and asked the Labour Party's National Executive Committee to set the timetable for choosing his successor, with nominations opening on 9 July. As only one candidate, Burnham, received the required nominations, the leadership contest concluded at the close of nominations on 16 July. Starmer remained in his positions until the conclusion of the 2026 leadership election, after which he was succeeded in both by Burnham.

== Reactions ==
=== Labour ===
On 12 May 2026, 103 Labour MPs signed a letter of support for the prime minister, coordinated by a group of Labour backbenchers, adding that this is "no time for a leadership contest." According to The Guardian, this number increased to over 110.

In May 2026, Deputy Prime Minister David Lammy said that "no-one seems to have the names to stand up" against Starmer, telling everyone to "take a breath". Miatta Fahnbulleh, who was one of the first to resign from the government, told Starmer that "the public does not believe that you can lead this change — and nor do I". Sarwar called for Starmer to resign but also was quoted as saying "he hadn't turned the screws on colleagues" to force their hand, saying it was a decision only for Westminster.

=== Conservatives ===
Conservative leader Kemi Badenoch described Starmer's speech on 11 May 2026 as "very sad to watch", adding that Labour members are too "busy arguing over who should drive the car" but "they are all heading in the wrong direction". She also said that she does "not take pleasure in watching the Prime Minister flounder." Shadow Transport Secretary Richard Holden said that Starmer has "lost the confidence of the country", and that he had "no option but to go".

=== Green Party ===
In response to Starmer's resignation announcement, Green Party leader Zack Polanski said that Starmer "lost the confidence of the country because of his abject failure to challenge the power and wealth of an establishment" and that Andy Burnham "must be bold or he will be bust" if replacing him.

=== Political commentators ===
According to HuffPost UK, following Starmer's speech on 11 May 2026, some political commentators labelled Starmer and the Labour Party "hypocrites" for managing the transition internally rather than calling an immediate general election. These critics drew direct comparisons to 2022, noting that during the Conservative Party leadership transitions of Liz Truss and Rishi Sunak, Starmer had explicitly insisted that changing a prime minister without a public vote lacked a democratic mandate and demanded a general election.

== Parliamentary Labour Party responses ==
=== Calls for Starmer's resignation ===
According to LabourList, on 14 May 2026 158 Labour MPs had shown support for Starmer, 103 had called for him to resign or set out a timetable, and 143 were either unknown or had not taken a position. The Labour MPs who had called for Starmer's resignation include:

Calls for Starmer's resignation (103)
- Debbie Abrahams
- Zubir Ahmed
- Tahir Ali
- Tonia Antoniazzi
- James Asser
- Jas Athwal
- David Baines
- Richard Baker
- Alex Ballinger
- Paula Barker
- Lorraine Beavers
- Apsana Begum
- Clive Betts
- Polly Billington
- Matt Bishop
- Olivia Blake
- Jonathan Brash
- Julia Buckley
- Richard Burgon
- Maureen Burke
- Dawn Butler
- Ian Byrne
- Markus Campbell-Savours
- Irene Campbell
- Sam Carling
- Luke Charters
- Lizzi Collinge
- Beccy Cooper
- Jen Craft
- Chris Curtis
- Alex Davies-Jones
- Paul Davies
- Anna Dixon
- Graeme Downie
- Neil Duncan-Jordan
- Cat Eccles
- Bill Esterson
- Miatta Fahnbulleh
- Josh Fenton-Glynn
- Paul Foster
- Mary Kelly Foy
- Barry Gardiner
- Alan Gemmell
- Ben Goldsborough
- Louise Haigh
- Sarah Hall
- Fabian Hamilton
- Paulette Hamilton
- Chris Hinchliff
- Jonathan Hinder
- Patrick Hurley
- Imran Hussain
- Sally Jameson
- Terry Jermy
- Kim Johnson
- Ruth Jones
- Naushabah Khan
- Peter Lamb
- Ian Lavery
- Brian Leishman
- Clive Lewis
- Rebecca Long-Bailey
- Justin Madders
- Rachael Maskell
- Andy McDonald
- John McDonnell
- Gordon McKee
- Kevin McKenna
- Alex McIntyre
- Catherine McKinnell
- Anneliese Midgley
- Navendu Mishra
- Abtisam Mohamed
- Joe Morris
- Luke Myer
- Connor Naismith
- Charlotte Nichols
- Simon Opher
- Kate Osborne
- Sarah Owen
- Jess Phillips
- Lee Pitcher
- Jo Platt
- Steve Race
- Andrew Ranger
- Bell Ribeiro-Addy
- Tom Rutland
- Josh Simons
- David Smith
- Sarah Smith
- Alex Sobel
- Euan Stainbank
- Wes Streeting
- Graham Stringer
- Peter Swallow
- Rachel Taylor
- Fred Thomas
- Jon Trickett
- Tony Vaughan
- Melanie Ward
- Catherine West
- Jo White
- Nadia Whittome
- Rosie Wrighting
- Yuan Yang

=== Calls for party unity ===
On 13 May 2026, 111 Labour MPs signed a letter calling for unity and to focus on regaining the trust of the public. That number expanded to 160 a couple of days later. However, there were some allegations by some MPs that they had their names put on the list without their permission. The Labour MPs who have supported party unity and Starmer include:

Calls for party unity (158)
- Jack Abbott
- Luke Akehurst
- Bayo Alaba
- Douglas Alexander
- Heidi Alexander
- Callum Anderson
- Jess Asato
- Catherine Atkinson
- Calvin Bailey
- Olivia Bailey
- Alex Baker
- Alex Barros-Curtis
- Johanna Baxter
- Hilary Benn
- Rachel Blake
- Kevin Bonavia
- Jade Botterill
- Sureena Brackenridge
- Phil Brickell
- Chris Bryant
- David Burton-Sampson
- Ruth Cadbury
- Nesil Caliskan
- Juliet Campbell
- Bambos Charalambous
- Luke Charters
- Ben Coleman
- Jacob Collier
- Tom Collins
- Liam Conlon
- Deirdre Costigan
- Pam Cox
- Neil Coyle
- Jonathan Davies
- Shaun Davies
- Jim Dickson
- Helena Dollimore
- Angela Eagle
- Maria Eagle
- Clive Efford
- Kirith Entwistle
- Chris Evans
- Linsey Farnsworth
- Patricia Ferguson
- Natalie Fleet
- Emma Foody
- Catherine Fookes
- Daniel Francis
- James Frith
- Allison Gardner
- Gill German
- Preet Kaur Gill
- Becky Gittins
- Georgia Gould
- Nia Griffith
- Amanda Hack
- Fabian Hamilton
- Carolyn Harris
- Lloyd Hatton
- Tom Hayes
- Claire Hazelgrove
- John Healey
- Claire Hughes
- Alison Hume
- Natasha Irons
- Diana Johnson
- Darren Jones
- Gerald Jones
- Sojan Joseph
- Warinder Juss
- Chris Kane
- Liz Kendall
- Stephen Kinnock
- Jayne Kirkham
- Gen Kitchen
- Sonia Kumar
- Peter Kyle
- Laura Kyrke-Smith
- David Lammy
- Noah Law
- Andrew Lewin
- Alice Macdonald
- Seema Malhotra
- Alex Mayer
- Douglas McAllister
- Kerry McCarthy
- Lola McEvoy
- Pat McFadden
- Anna McMorrin
- Ed Miliband
- Julie Minns
- Perran Moon
- Stephen Morgan
- Luke Murphy
- Chris Murray
- Ian Murray
- James Murray
- Lisa Nandy
- Josh Newbury
- Samantha Niblett
- Alex Norris
- Abena Oppong-Asare
- Tris Osborne
- Darren Paffey
- Andrew Pakes
- Michael Payne
- Jon Pearce
- Matthew Pennycook
- Toby Perkins
- Bridget Phillipson
- David Pinto-Duschinsky
- Luke Pollard
- Joe Powell
- Lucy Powell
- Peter Prinsley
- Steve Reed
- Rachel Reeves
- Emma Reynolds
- Jake Richards
- Jenny Riddell-Carpenter
- Lucy Rigby
- Marie Rimmer
- Tim Roca
- Matt Rodda
- Sam Rushworth
- Oliver Ryan
- Michelle Scrogham
- Mark Sewards
- Baggy Shanker
- Tulip Siddiq
- Andy Slaughter
- John Slinger
- Nick Smith
- Keir Starmer
- Jo Stevens
- Alistair Strathern
- Alan Strickland
- Kirsteen Sullivan
- Lauren Sullivan
- Mike Tapp
- Alison Taylor
- David Taylor
- Nick Thomas-Symonds
- Stephen Timms
- Jessica Toale
- Anna Turley
- Matt Turmaine
- Liz Twist
- Chris Vince
- Chris Ward
- Michelle Welsh
- Andrew Western
- Matt Western
- John Whitby
- Sean Woodcock
- Steve Yemm
- Daniel Zeichner
