= Caroline Simpson =

British civil servant

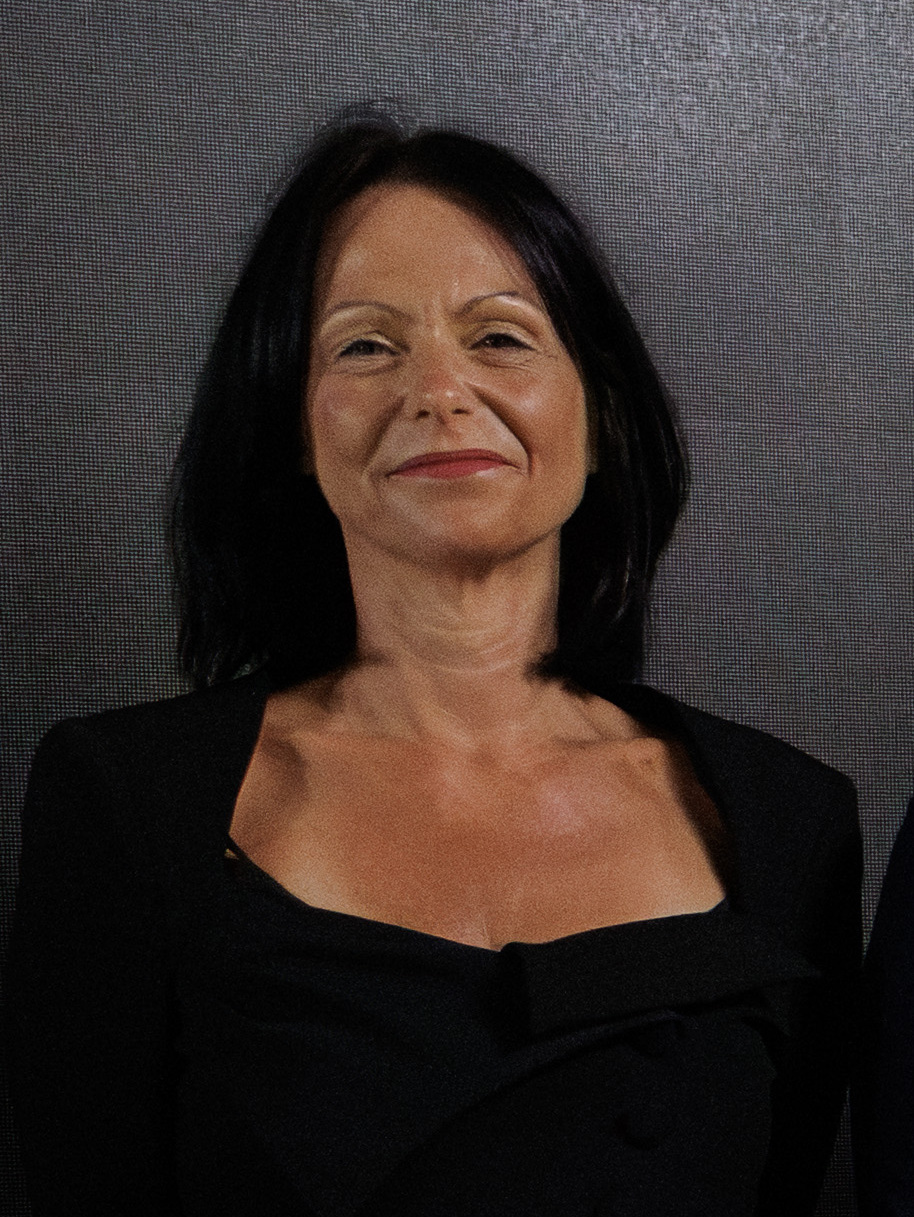
- Simpson in 2026

Downing Street Deputy Chief of Staff for Number 10 North
- Incumbent
- Assumed office 20 July 2026
- Prime Minister: Andy Burnham
- Preceded by: Position established

Chief Executive of the Greater Manchester Combined Authority
- In office 25 June 2024 – 20 July 2026
- Mayor: Andy Burnham; Paul Dennett (acting)
- Preceded by: Eamonn Boylan
- Succeeded by: Andrew Lightfoot (acting)

Personal details
- Party: Labour

Caroline Simpson is a British civil servant who has served as chief executive of the Greater Manchester Combined Authority since 25 June 2024 and headed Number 10 North as Downing Street Deputy Chief of Staff, since Labour Party leader Andy Burnham became Prime Minister of the United Kingdom on 20 July 2026.

== Early life and education ==
Simpson was born in April 1972. She graduated from Liverpool John Moores University with a 2.1 in Japanese & International Business Studies in 1994.

== Career ==
Simpson was head of partnerships at the North West Development Agency.

She then worked at Cheshire East Council as executive director for economic growth and prosperity until 2016.

In 2016, Simpson joined Stockport Council, firstly as director of regeneration, then as deputy chief executive and corporate director of place until 2022. She then served as chief executive of Stockport Council between 2022 and 2024.

Simpson was announced in March 2024 as the replacement for Eamonn Boylan as chief executive of the Greater Manchester Combined Authority (GMCA).

She also heads Greater Manchester Fire and Rescue Service and Transport for Greater Manchester. She is also credited with driving the Greater Manchester Good Growth Fund.

The Guardian and The i newspapers reported that Simpson would head Number 10 North as Downing Street Deputy Chief of Staff, when Labour Party leader Andy Burnham became Prime Minister of the United Kingdom on 20 July 2026.
