= Leader of the Labour Party =

The title Leader of the Labour Party may refer to:

- Leader of the Labour Party (Ireland)
- Leader of the Labour Party (Netherlands)
- Leader of the Labour Party (UK)
  - Leader of the Scottish Labour Party
- Leader of the New Zealand Labour Party

== See also ==
- Leaders of the Australian Labor Party
- Deputy Leader of the Labour Party (UK)
- Labour Party (disambiguation)
- Labour Party leadership election (disambiguation)
