= Number 10 North =

British government office unit

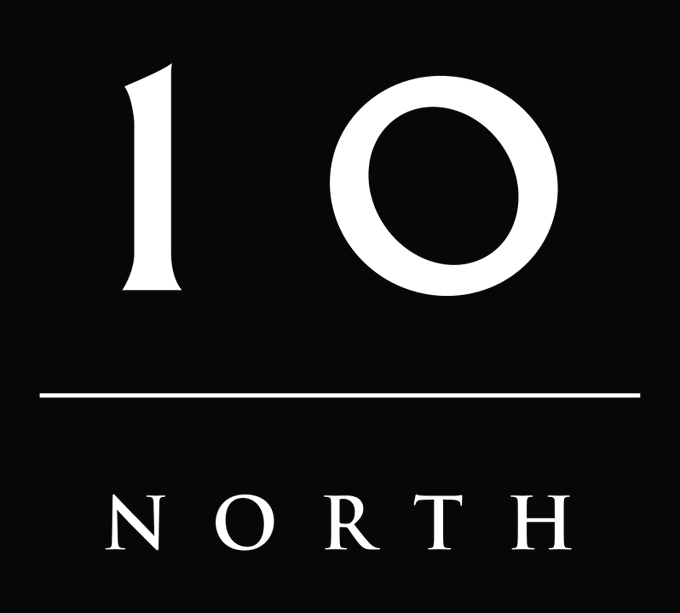
- Number 10 North logo

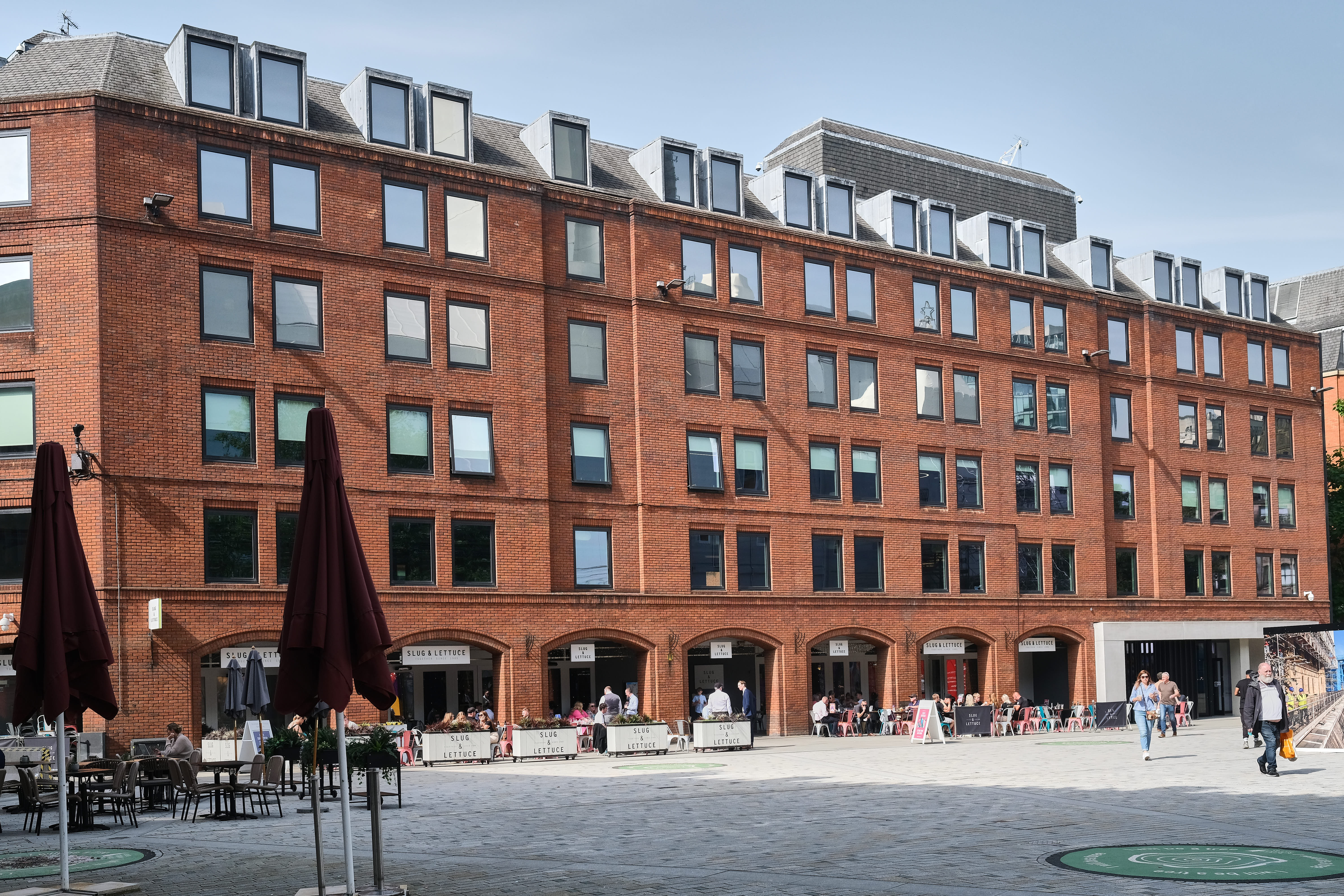
- Heron House, Manchester serves as the interim headquarters of Number 10 North.

Agency overview
- Formed: 20 July 2026
- Jurisdiction: UK Government
- Headquarters: Heron House, Manchester, United Kingdom; 53°28′46″N 2°14′46″W
- Minister responsible: Louise Haigh, First Secretary of State
- Agency executive: Caroline Simpson, Deputy Chief of Staff for Number 10 North
- Parent department: Office for the Prime Minister and Cabinet
- Website: gov.uk/government/organisations/prime-ministers-office-10-downing-street

Number 10 North is a unit of the UK government's Office for the Prime Minister and Cabinet, based in Heron House in Manchester city centre. Its name refers to 10 Downing Street, the principal office and London residence of the prime minister of the United Kingdom.

== Background ==
In 2019, GCHQ set up offices at Heron House near Albert Square, in Manchester.

On 20 July 2026, Andy Burnham became the prime minister of the United Kingdom. He previously served as mayor of Greater Manchester between 2017 and 2026. He made the Number 10 North proposal on 29 June 2026, during a speech at the People's History Museum in Manchester; his first major speech since the previous Prime Minister and Labour leader Keir Starmer's announcement that he would resign.

Burnham intends to remain living in Manchester and will spend at least one day a week working from Number 10 North.

Number 10 North will relocate to the Manchester Digital Campus when operational in 2032; the site is currently under construction on Great Ancoats Street.

After Burnham became prime minister on 20 July 2026, it was reported that Number 10 North was already functional, with Heron House – an existing government building in Manchester city centre, partially occupied by GCHQ – serving as its interim headquarters. It is a part of the Office for the Prime Minister and Cabinet based in Manchester in the North of England. Its first meeting was a meeting of the revived National Economic Council on 24 July 2026, bringing together government ministers and regional mayors.

== Purpose ==
Burnham launched the new Number 10 North in Manchester, to deliver "growth in every corner of the country". This new branch of Downing Street is aimed to shift power from Westminster to regions. With his new Chancellor John Healey standing behind him, Burnham told staff that the shift north showed he was rewiring the state.

Burnham described his plan as being to "oversee the biggest rebalancing of power our country has ever seen". He said that Number 10 North would be the "nerve centre of a rewired Britain".

Burnham set out three "clear tasks" for Number 10 North:

- To increase public control of essential utilities such as water, energy and housing;
- To re-industrialise swathes of the country;
- To regenerate towns, prioritising places that had been left behind.

Upon establishment, Number 10 North additionally assumed responsibility for English devolution and local economic growth strategy from the Ministry of Housing, Communities and Local Government (MHCLG), and local economic growth policy from HM Treasury.

== Ministers and civil servants ==
On a ministerial level, Number 10 North is overseen by the First Secretary of State, Louise Haigh.

The Guardian has reported that the Greater Manchester Combined Authority chief executive, Caroline Simpson, would head Number 10 North as Burnham's Downing Street deputy chief of staff.

Office	Incumbent	Term
Director-General	Sam Lister	24 July 2026 – present
Deputy Chief of Staff (Number 10 North)	Caroline Simpson	20 July 2026 – present
Special Adviser	Kevin Lee	August 2026 – present
Special Adviser	Kate Groucutt	20 July 2026 – present
Special Adviser for Policy	Jon-Paul Spencer	August 2026 – present
Adviser for Transport and policy	Sarah Brown	August 2026 – present
Adviser for Economic Policy	John Wrathmell	August 2026 – present
Executive Assistant to the Prime Minister	Amy Davies	August 2026 – present

== See also ==
- Darlington Economic Campus, dubbed Number 11 North
- Manchesterism
