= Office for the Prime Minister and Cabinet =

Office of the British government

Agency overview
- Formed: 21 July 2026; 3 months ago
- Jurisdiction: Government of the United Kingdom
- Ministers responsible: Andy Burnham, Prime Minister; Louise Haigh, First Secretary of State, Chancellor of the Duchy of Lancaster, and Minister for the Cabinet Office
- Agency executive: Dame Antonia Romeo, Cabinet Secretary
- Child agencies: Prime Minister's Office (10 Downing Street); Number 10 North
- Website: www.gov.uk/government/organisations/prime-ministers-office-10-downing-street

The Office for the Prime Minister and Cabinet (OPMC) is the office of the British government established in July 2026.

== Background and responsibilities ==
The OPMC was established, as part of a reorganisation of the centre of government, within the Cabinet Office in July 2026 by the Burnham ministry. It consists of the Prime Minister's Office at 10 Downing Street in London, the Number 10 North unit in Manchester, and core Cabinet Office functions serving the prime minister and cabinet. It will also contain a new AI Taskforce. It is led by the Cabinet Secretary, Dame Antonia Romeo. Many of the remaining Cabinet Office functions will be transferred to a new OneGov Delivery Agency from April 2027. This agency will manage operational services at arm's length, including the Government Recruitment Service, pensions, shared services, the Government Car Service, and security vetting.
