= John Beddington =

British biologist

Professor Sir John Beddington CMG FRS FRSE HonFREng
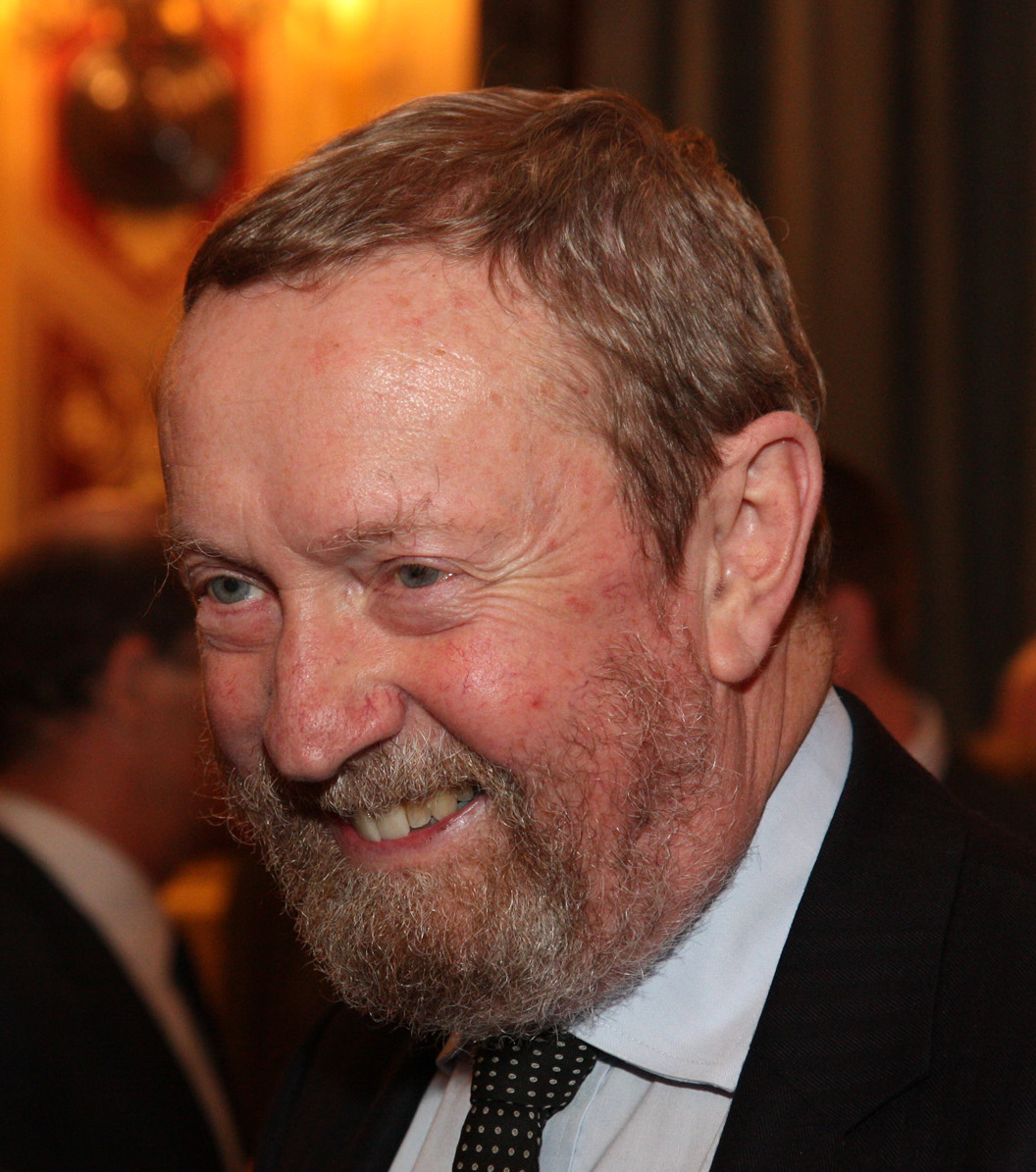
- Born: John Rex Beddington; 13 October 1945 (age 80)
- Education: London School of Economics (undergraduate); University of Edinburgh (postgraduate)
- Known for: Sustainable management of renewable resources Government Chief Scientific Adviser (2008–2013)
- Spouses: Sarah West (m. 1968; div. 1972) Sally Baldwin (m. 1973; div. 1979) Caroline Hiller (m. 1990)
- Awards: Fellow of the Royal Society (2001); Knight Bachelor (2010); Order of St Michael and St George (2004); Honorary FREng (2012)
- Scientific career
- Fields: Population biology
- Workplaces: Oxford Martin School; Imperial College London; University of York; University of Edinburgh
- Thesis: The exploitation of red deer (Cervus elaphus L.) in Scotland.
- Website: oxfordmartin.ox.ac.uk/people/525

Sir John Rex Beddington (born 13 October 1945) is a British population biologist and senior adviser at the Oxford Martin School, and was previously Professor of Applied Population Biology at Imperial College London, and the UK Government Chief Scientific Adviser from 2008 until 2013.

== Education ==
Beddington was educated at Monmouth School in south-east Wales, close to the English border. He then attended the London School of Economics, gaining a BSc degree in economics in 1967, and later an MSc degree in 1968. In 1973 he was awarded a PhD degree from the University of Edinburgh.

== Research and career ==
Beddington's research applies biology and economics to the sustainable management of natural resources.

From 1968 to 1971 Beddington was a research assistant at the University of Edinburgh. Among his first published work was a report analysing a survey of motivations of blood donors which appeared as an appendix to Richard Titmuss' 1970 book The Gift Relationship. From 1971 to 1984 he was a lecturer in population biology at the University of York.

=== Oxford Martin School ===
Beddington was part of the Oxford Martin School from May 2013 until 2018. He served as the senior advisor to Professor Ian Goldin, the School's Director. The Oxford Martin School is made up of a community of more than 200 researchers, working to address the most pressing global challenges and opportunities of the 21st century.

=== Imperial College London ===
Beddington joined Imperial in 1984, was promoted to Reader in 1987 and was appointed Professor of Applied Population Biology there in 1991.

Beddington has been a specialist in the economics and biology of sustainable management of renewable resources, and has previously advised UK ministers on scientific and environmental issues. He has chaired the Department for Environment, Food and Rural Affairs' science advisory panel and the Defence Scientific Advisory Committee, and is a member of the Natural Environmental Research Council. He has also advised the European Commission and the United Nations Food and Agriculture Organisation.

=== Chief Scientific Adviser ===
On 1 October 2007, it was announced by the Prime Minister Gordon Brown that Beddington would succeed Professor Sir David King as the Chief Scientific Adviser to the UK Government with effect from 1 January 2008. His annual remuneration for this role was £165,000. Beddington was closely involved in helping the British government formulate its response to the Fukushima Daiichi nuclear disaster, the eruptions of Icelandic volcanoes and ash dieback disease in the UK. In March 2009 Beddington addressed the Sustainable Development UK conference warning that the world faced a "perfect storm" involving food shortages, scarce water and insufficient energy resources. These, he explained, would threaten to led to public unrest and territorial disputes. Mass migration from the worst-affected regions would occur as people flee for more sustainable regions. "We head into a perfect storm in 2030, because all of these things are operating on the same time frame," he argued. In June 2023 a group of climate scientists argued that they saw this as "prescient".

==== Successor ====
In April 2013 Beddington was succeeded by Mark Walport.

=== Awards and honours ===
Professor Beddington was awarded the Heidelberg Award for Environmental Excellence in June 1997, was elected a Fellow of the Royal Society in 2001 and was appointed Companion of the Order of St Michael and St George (CMG) by Queen Elizabeth II in 2004, in recognition of his services to fisheries science and management. He was also appointed an Honorary Fellow of the Royal Academy of Engineering in 2012 and was elected a Fellow of the Royal Society of Edinburgh in 2011.

In July 2014, he was recognised by the Government of Japan for his contributions to strengthening the co-operation between Japan and the UK in the areas of science and technology.

== Personal life ==
Beddington was knighted in the 2010 Birthday Honours. He was married to Sarah West from 1968 until their divorce in 1972. They have one son. In 1973, he married social policy professor Sally Baldwin. They divorced in 1979, and have one daughter, Emma Beddington, journalist at The Guardian. He married his current spouse, Caroline Hiller, in 1990.

Government offices
Preceded by David King	Government Chief Scientific Adviser; 2008–2013	Succeeded by Mark Walport
