= United Nations Population Award =

Award by the United Nations Population Fund

The United Nations Population Award is an international award presented annually by the United Nations Population Fund to individuals and organizations that have made significant contributions to population and reproductive health issues. Recipients of the award receive a medal, a diploma, and a monetary prize.

== History ==
The award was established by the United Nations General Assembly in 1981 to recognize "outstanding contributions to population and reproductive health questions and to their solutions," and was first presented in 1983.

In 1983, the inaugural presentation of the award sparked controversy. Two $12,500 awards were given to Prime Minister Indira Gandhi of India and China's family planning chief Qian Xinzhong, drawing criticism. Economist Theodore W. Shultz, an agency adviser, publicly condemned the awards, alleging that they disregarded expert advice and endorsed countries with aggressive population control methods. He argued that the awards could undermine family planning efforts, citing India's history of forced sterilization and China's punitive policies. The United Nations Fund defended the awards, highlighting that China had outlawed female infanticide, and no longer faced such issues in India.

== Recipients ==
Year	Recipients	Country	Ref
1983	Indira Gandhi; Qian Xinzhong	India; China	
1984	Carmen A. Miró; Sheldon J. Segal	Panama; United States	
1985	International Planned Parenthood Federation (IPPF)	International	
1986	National Population Council of Mexico	Mexico	
1987	Hussain Muhammad Ershad; National Family and Population Office of Tunisia	Bangladesh; Tunisia	
1988	Shidzue Kato; PROFAMILIA	Japan; Colombia	
1989	Suharto; Programme national de Bien-être familial of Togo	Indonesia; Togo	
1990	Alfred Sauvy; National Family Health and Population Council of Mauritius	France; Mauritius	
1991	Julia J. Henderson; Centre for Population Studies and Responsible Parenthood	United States; Ecuador	
1992	J. R. D. Tata; The Population Council	India; International	
1993	Fred T. Sai; Mainichi Shimbun Population Problems Research Council	Ghana; Japan	
1994	Hosni Mubarak; Turkish Family Health and Planning Foundation	Egypt; Turkey	
1995	Halfdan Mahler; Inter-African Committee on the Traditional Practices Affecting the Health of Women and Children	Denmark; Intercontinental	
1996	Leticia Ramos Shahani; Pathfinder International	Philippines; International	
1997	Elizabeth Aguire de Calderón Sol; Toshio Kuroda; Mechai Viravaidya	El Salvador; Japan; Thailand	
1998	Hugh H. Wynter; Sabiny Elders Association	Jamaica; Uganda	
1999	Alireza Marandi; National Committee for Population and Family Planning	Iran; Vietnam	
2000	Ismail Awadallah Salam; Fundación Mexicana para la Planeación Familiar (MEXFAM)	Egypt; Mexico	
2001	Nafis Sadik; Japanese Organization for International Cooperation in Family Planning	Pakistan; Japan	
2002	Kwasi Odoi-Agyarko; EngenderHealth	Ghana; United States	
2003	Werner Fornos; Family Planning Association of Kenya	United States; Kenya	
2004	John C. Caldwell; Addis Ababa Fistula Hospital	Australia; Ethiopia	
2005	Mercedes B. Concepcion; Asociación Pro Bienestar de la Familia de Guatemala	Philippines; Guatemala	
2006	Halida Hanum Akhter; Fondation Pour la Santé Reproductive et l’Education Familiale (FOSREF)	Bangladesh; Haiti	
2007	Allan Rosenfield; Hossein Malek Afzali; Le Comité National de Population of Algeria; The National Population and Family Planning Board of Malaysia	United States; Iran; Algeria; Malaysia	
2008	Billie Antoinette Miller; Family Care International (FCI)	Barbados; United States	
2009	Mahmoud Fathalla; Movimiento Comunal Nicaragüense (MCN)	Egypt; Nicaragua	
2010	Bill Gates and Melinda Gates; Asian Forum of Parliamentarians for Population and Development (AFPPD)	United States; Intercontinental	
2011	Mohammad Jalal Abbasi-Shavazi; Institut de Formation et de Recherche Démographique (IFORD)	Iran; Cameroon	
2012	Adrienne Germain; Federation of Reproductive Health Associations	United States; Malaysia	
2013	Jotham Musinguzi; International Islamic Centre for Population Studies and Research	Uganda; International	
2014	Father Aldo Marchesini; Johns Hopkins Program for International Education in Gynecology and Obstetrics	Italy; United States	
2015	Thoraya Obaid; African Population and Health Research Centre (APHRC)	Saudi Arabia; Kenya	
2016	Carmen Barroso; Childbirth in Dignity Foundation	Brazil; Poland	
2017	Hans Rosling; Association of Traditional Chiefs of Niger (Association des chefs traditionnels du Niger, ACTN)	Sweden; Niger	
2018	Prince Ramsey; Guttmacher Institute; Save a Child's Heart	Antigua and Barbuda; United States; Israel	
2019	Mamadou Tangara; National Peace Hut Women of Liberia	Gambia; Liberia	
2020	Queen Mother Ashi Sangay Choden Wangchuck; HelpAge India	Bhutan; India	
2021	Commissaire Principale Hassane Haousseize Zouera; General Directorate of Population of Oaxaca (DIGEPO)	Niger; Mexico	
2022	Emma Theofelus; National Population and Family Planning Board	Namibia; Indonesia	
2023	Angeline Ndayishimiye; African Institute for Development Policy	Burundi; Intercontinental	
2025	Varsha Deshpande; International Union for the Scientific Study of Population	India; Intercontinental	
