= British Science Association =

British learned society

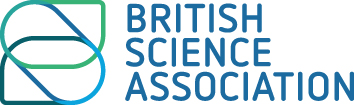
- Founded: 1831; 195 years ago
- Type: Professional organisation and registered charity
- Registration no.: 212479
- Location(s): Wellcome Wolfson Building, 165 Queen's Gate, London SW7 5HD
- Coordinates: 51.4971°N 0.1790°W
- Region served: UK, Worldwide
- Key people: Chair: Hilary Newiss; President: Professor Kevin Fenton; CEO: Hannah Russell
- Revenue: £2,754,408 (year ending Dec 2018)
- Employees: 30
- Volunteers: 650
- Website: www.britishscienceassociation.org

The British Science Association (BSA) is a charity and learned society founded in 1831 to aid in the promotion and development of science. Until 2009 it was known as the British Association for the Advancement of Science (BA). The current Chief Executive is Hannah Russell. The BSA's mission is to get more people engaged in the field of science by coordinating, delivering, and overseeing different projects that are suited to achieve these goals. The BSA "envisions a society in which a diverse group of people can learn and apply the sciences in which they learn." and is managed by a professional staff located at their Head Office in the Wellcome Wolfson Building. The BSA offers a wide variety of activities and events that both recognise and encourage people to be involved in science. These include the British Science Festival, British Science Week, the CREST Awards, For Thought, The Ideas Fund, along with regional and local events.

== History ==
=== Foundation ===
The former British Science Association logo launched in 2009

Old logo used for "The BA"

The Association was founded in 1831 and modelled on the German Gesellschaft Deutscher Naturforscher und Ärzte. It was founded during post-war reconstruction after the Peninsula war to improve the advancement of science in England. The prime mover (who is regarded as the main founder) was Reverend William Vernon Harcourt, following a suggestion by Sir David Brewster, who was disillusioned with the elitist and conservative attitude of the Royal Society. Charles Babbage, William Whewell and J. F. W. Johnston are also considered to be founding members. The first meeting was held in York (at the Yorkshire Museum) on Tuesday 27 September 1831 with various scientific papers being presented on the following days. It was chaired by Viscount Milton, president of the Yorkshire Philosophical Society, and "upwards of 300 gentlemen" attended the meeting. The Preston Mercury recorded that those gathered consisted of "persons of distinction from various parts of the kingdom, together with several of the gentry of Yorkshire and the members of philosopher societies in this country". The newspaper published the names of over a hundred of those attending and these included, amongst others, eighteen clergymen, eleven doctors, four knights, two Viscounts and one Lord.

From that date onwards a meeting was held annually at a place chosen at a previous meeting. In 1832, for example, the meeting was held in Oxford, chaired by Reverend Dr William Buckland. By this stage the Association had four sections: Physics (including Mathematics and Mechanical Arts), Chemistry (including Mineralogy and Chemical Arts), Geology (including Geography) and Natural History.

During this second meeting, the first objects and rules of the Association were published. Objects included systematically directing the acquisition of scientific knowledge, spreading this knowledge as well as discussion between scientists across the world, and to focus on furthering science by removing obstacles to progress. The rules established included what constituted a member of the Association, the fee to remain a member, and the process for future meetings. They also include dividing the members into different committees. These committees separated members into their preferred subject matter, and were to recommend investigations into areas of interest, then report on these findings, as well as progress in their science at the annual meetings.

Additional sections were added throughout the years by either splitting off part of an original section, like making Geography and Ethnology its own section apart from Geology in 1851, or by defining a new subject area of discussion, such as Anthropology in 1869.

A very important decision in the Association's history was made in 1842 when it was resolved to create a "physical observatory". A building that became well known as the Kew Observatory was taken on for the purpose and Francis Ronalds was chosen as the inaugural Honorary Director. Kew Observatory quickly became one of the most renowned meteorological and geomagnetic observatories in the world. The Association relinquished control of the Kew Observatory in 1871 to the management of the Royal Society, after a large donation to grant the observatory its independence.

In 1872, the Association purchased its first central office in London, acquiring four rooms at 22 Albemarle Street. This office was intended to be a resource for members of the Association.

One of the most famous events linked to the Association Meeting was an exchange between Thomas Henry Huxley and Bishop Samuel Wilberforce in 1860 (see the 1860 Oxford evolution debate). Although it is often described as a "debate", the exchange occurred after the presentation of a paper by Prof Draper of New York, on the intellectual development of Europe with relation to Darwin's theory (one of a number of scientific papers presented during the week) and the subsequent discussion involved a number of other participants (although Wilberforce and Huxley were the most prominent). Although a number of newspapers made passing references to the exchange, it was not until later that it was accorded greater significance in the evolution debate.

=== Electrical standards ===
One of the most important contributions of the British Association was the establishment of standards for electrical usage: the ohm as the unit of electrical resistance, the volt as the unit of electrical potential, and the ampere as the unit of electrical current. A need for standards arose with the submarine telegraph industry. Practitioners came to use their own standards established by wire coils: "By the late 1850s, Clark, Varley, Bright, Smith and other leading British cable engineers were using calibrated resistance coils on a regular basis and were beginning to use calibrated condensers as well."

The undertaking was suggested to the BA by William Thomson, and its success was due to the use of Thomson's mirror galvanometer. Josiah Latimer Clark and Fleeming Jenkin made preparations. Thomson, with his students, found that impure copper, contaminated with arsenic, introduced significant extra resistance. The chemist Augustus Matthiessen contributed an appendix (A) to the final 1873 report that showed temperature-dependence of alloys.

The natural relation between these units are clearly, that a unit of electromotive force between two points of a conductor separated by a unit of resistance shall produce unit current, and that this current in a unit of time convey a unit quantity of electricity.

The unit system was "absolute" since it agreed with previously accepted units of work, or energy:

The unit current of electricity, in passing through a conductor of unit resistance, does a unit of work or its equivalent in a unit of time.

=== Committee on Mechanical Nomenclature ===
In 1888, at a meeting of the British Association in Bath, the Committee on Mechanical Nomenclature suggested three new units: the kine for velocity, equal to 1 centimeter per second; the bole for momentum, equal to 1 gram times 1 kine; and the barad for pressure, equal to 1 dyne per square centimeter. The London Electrical Review called the new units "an abomination, and wholly unnecessary" and attributed their creation to a "craze" for naming new units. William Henry Preece noted in 1891 that he had only seen one instance of use of the new units. By 1913, the units had fallen entirely out of use.

=== Other ===
The Association was parodied by English novelist Charles Dickens as 'The Mudfog Society for the Advancement of Everything' in The Mudfog Papers (1837–38).

In 1878 a committee of the Association recommended against constructing Charles Babbage's analytical engine, due to concerns about the current state of the machine's lack of complete working drawings, the machine's potential cost to produce, the machine's durability during repeated use, how and what the machine will actually be utilized for, and that more work would need to be done to bring the design up to a standard at which it is guaranteed to work.

The Association introduced the British Association (usually termed "BA") screw threads, a series of screw thread standards in sizes from 0.25 mm up to 6 mm, in 1882. The standards were based on the metric system, although they had to be re-defined in imperial terms for use by UK industry. The standard was modified in 1884 to restrict significant figures for the metric counterpart of diameter and pitch of the screw in the published table, as well as not designating screws by their number of threads per inch, and instead giving an approximation due to considerable actual differences in manufactured screws.

In 1889, a member of the Rational Dress Society, Charlotte Carmichael Stopes, stunned the proceedings of a meeting of the Association in Newcastle upon Tyne by organizing an impromptu session where she introduced rational dress to a wide audience, her speech being noted in newspapers across Britain.

In 1903, microscopist and astronomer Washington Teasdale died whilst attending the annual meeting.

== Perception of science in the UK ==
The Association's main aim is to make science more relevant, representative and connected to society.

At the beginning of the Great Depression, the Association's focus began to shift their purpose to account for not only scientific progress, but the social aspects of such progress. In the Association's 1931 meeting, the president General Jan Christiaan Smuts ended his address by the proposal of linking science and ethics together but provided no means to actuate his ideas. In the following years, debate began as to whom the responsibilities of scientists fell upon. The Association adopted a resolution in 1934 that dedicated efforts to better balance scientific advancement with social progress.

J.D. Bernal, a member of the Royal Society and the British Association, wrote The Social Function of Science in 1939, describing a need to correctly utilize science for society and the importance of its public perception. The idea of the public perception of science was furthered in 1985 when the Royal Society published a report titled The Public Understanding of Science.

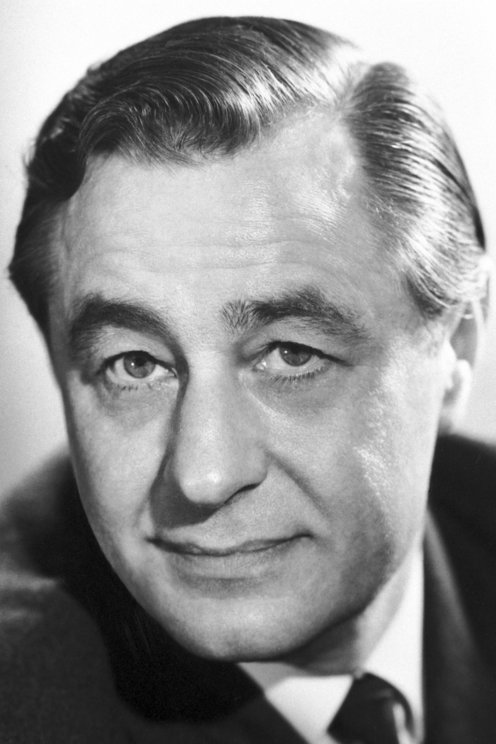
Sir George Porter

In the report, a committee of the Royal Society determined that it was scientists' duty to communicate to and educate the public. Lord George Porter, then president of the Royal Society, British Association, and director of the Royal Institution, created the Committee on the Public Understanding of Science, or COPUS, to promote public understanding of science.

Professor Sir George Porter became the president in September 1985. He won the Nobel Prize in Chemistry 1967 along with Manfred Eigen, and Ronald George Wreyford Norrish. When asked about the scientific literacy of Britain, he stated that Britain was the least educated country compared to all the other advanced countries. His idea to solve this problem would be to start scientific education for children at the age of 4. He says his reason for such an early age is because that is the age when children are the most curious, and implementing science at that age will help them gain curiosity towards all disciplines of science. When asked why public ignorance to science matters, his response was

It matters because among those who are scientifically illiterate are some of those who are in power, people who lead us in politics, in civil service, in the media, in the church, often in industry and sometimes even in education. Think, for example, about the enormous influence of scientific knowledge on one's whole philosophy of life, even one's religion. It is no more permissible for the archbishops of today, who advise their flocks on how to interpret the Scriptures, to ignore the findings of Watson and Crick, than it was right for clerics of the last century to ignore the work of Darwin. Science today is all-pervasive. Without some scientific and technical education, it is becoming impossible even to vote responsibly on matters of health, energy, defense or education. So unless things change, we shall soon live in a country that is backward not only in its technology and standard of living but in its cultural vitality too. It is wrong to suppose that by foregoing technological and scientific education we shall somehow become a nation of artists, writers or philosophers instead. These two aspects of culture have never been divorced from each other throughout our history. Every renaissance, every period that showed a flowering of civilization, advanced simultaneously in the arts and sciences, and in technology too.

Sir Kenneth Durham, former director of research at Unilever, said that reporting of sciences gave good coverage to medical science, but that "editors ought to be sensitive to developments in areas such as solid state physics, astro-physics, colloid science, molecular biology, transmission of stimuli along nerve fibres, and other areas that will profoundly affect us in the future" and that newspaper editors were in danger of waiting for disasters before the scientific factors involved in the incidents were explained.

In the year 2000, Sir Peter Williams had put together a panel to discuss the shortage of physics majors. A physicist called Derek Raine had stated that he has had multiple firms call him up asking for physics majors. The report they made stated that it is critical that they increase the number of physics teachers, or it will have a detrimental effect on the number of future engineers and scientists.

In 2001, Sir William Stewart, as outgoing president, warned that universities faced a "dumbing down".

=== British Science Festival ===
The Association's major emphasis in recent decades has been on public engagement in science. Its annual meeting, now called the British Science Festival, is the largest public showcase for science in the UK and attracts a great deal of media attention. It is held at UK universities in early September for one week, with visits to science-related local cultural attractions.

The 2010 Festival, held in Birmingham with Aston University as lead University partner, featured a prank event: the unveiling of Dulcis foetidus, a fictional plant purported to emit a pungent odour. An experiment in herd mentality, some audience members were induced into believing they could smell it. The Festival has also been the home to protest and debate. In 1970 there were protestors over the use of science for weapons.

=== Science Communication Conference ===
The Association organised and held the annual Science Communication Conference for over ten years. It was the largest conference of its kind in the UK, and addressed the key issues facing science communicators. In 2015, the BSA introduced a new series of smaller events for science communicators, designed to address the same issues as the Science Communication Conference but for a more targeted audience.

=== British Science Week ===
Logo of British Science Week

In addition to the British Science Festival, the British Science Association organises the British Science Week (formerly National Science & Engineering Week), an opportunity for people of all ages to get involved in science, engineering, technology and maths activities, originating as the National Week of Science, Engineering and Technology.

The Association also has a young people's programme, the CREST Awards which seeks to involve school students in science beyond the school curriculum, and to encourage them to consider higher education and careers in science.

Huxley Summit

Named after Thomas Huxley, the Huxley Summit is a leadership event run by the British Science Association, where 250 of the most influential people in the UK are brought together to discuss scientific and social challenges that the UK faces in the 21st century and to develop a link between scientists and non-scientists to ensure that science can be understood by society as a whole. On 8 November 2016, the British Science Association held the very first Huxley Summit at BAFTA, London. The theme of the summit was "Trust in the 21st Century" and how that would affect the future of science, innovation, and business.

Media Fellowship Schemes

The British Science Association's Media Fellowship provides the opportunity for practicing scientists, clinicians, and engineers to spend a period of time working at media outlets such as the Guardian, BBC Breakfast or The Londonist. After their time with the media placement, the fellows attend the British Science Festival which will offer these practitioners valuable working experience with a range of media organizations along with learning from a wide range of public engagement activities and be able to network with academics, journalists and science communicators.

== CREST Awards ==
CREST Awards is the British Science Association's scheme to encourage students aged 5–19 to get involved with STEM projects and encourage scientific thinking. Awards range from Star Awards (targeted at those aged 5–7) to Gold Awards (targeted to those aged 16–19). Overall, 30,000 awards are undertaken annually. Many students who do CREST Awards, especially Silver and Gold Awards which require 30 and 70 hours of work respectively, enter competitions like the UK Big Bang Fair.

== Patrons and Presidents of the British Science Association ==
Traditionally the president is elected at the meeting usually held in August/September for a one-year term and gives a presidential address upon retiring. The honour of the presidency is traditionally bestowed only once per individual. Written sources that give the year of presidency as a single year generally mean the year in which the presidential address is given. In 1926/1927 the association's patron was King George V and the president was his son Edward, Prince of Wales. The vice-presidents for the Leeds meeting at this time included City of Leeds Alderman Charles Lupton and his brother, Lord Mayor of Leeds Hugh Lupton. The husband of the brothers' first cousin once removed - Lord Airedale of Gledhow - was also a vice-president at the Leeds meeting.

Presidents 1831–1849
- 1831: Charles Wentworth-Fitzwilliam, 5th Earl Fitzwilliam, statistician.
- 1832: Rev. William Buckland, palaeontologist
- 1833: Rev. Adam Sedgwick, geologist
- 1834: Sir Thomas Makdougall Brisbane, astronomer
- 1835: Rev. Humphrey Lloyd, physicist
- 1836: Henry Petty-Fitzmaurice, 3rd Marquess of Lansdowne, statistician
- 1837: William Cavendish, 2nd Earl of Burlington, Chancellor of the University of London
- 1838: Algernon Percy, 4th Duke of Northumberland, Naval officer
- 1839: Canon William Vernon Harcourt
- 1840: John Campbell, 2nd Marquess of Breadalbane
- 1841: Rev. William Whewell, polymath and philosopher of science
- 1842: Lord Francis Egerton
- 1843: William Parsons, 3rd Earl of Rosse, astronomer
- 1844: Rev. George Peacock, mathematician
- 1845: Sir John F. W. Herschel, astronomer & polymath
- 1846: Sir Roderick Impey Murchison, geologist
- 1847: Sir Robert Harry Inglis
- 1848: Spencer Compton, 2nd Marquess of Northampton, geologist
- 1849: Rev. Thomas Romney Robinson, astronomer
Presidents 1850–1899
- 1850: Sir David Brewster, physicist
- 1851: Sir George Biddell Airy, Astronomer Royal
- 1852: Colonel Edward Sabine, Vice-president of the Royal Society
- 1853: William Hopkins, mathematician and geologist
- 1854: Dudley Ryder, 2nd Earl of Harrowby
- 1855: George Campbell, 8th Duke of Argyll
- 1856: Charles D. B. Daubeny, botanist
- 1857: Rev. Humphrey Lloyd, physicist
- 1858: Sir Richard Owen, naturalist
- 1859: Albert, Prince Consort
- 1860: John Wrottesley, 2nd Baron Wrottesley, astronomer
- 1861: Sir William Fairbairn, civil engineer
- 1862: Rev. Robert Willis, civil engineer
- 1863: William Armstrong, engineer and inventor
- 1864: Sir Charles Lyell, geologist
- 1865: John Phillips, geologist
- 1866: William Robert Grove
- 1867: Walter Montagu Douglas Scott, 5th Duke of Buccleuch
- 1868: Joseph Dalton Hooker, botanist
- 1869: Sir George Stokes, 1st Baronet, mathematical physicist
- 1870: Thomas Henry Huxley, biologist
- 1871: Sir William Thomson, physicist
- 1872: William Benjamin Carpenter
- 1873: Alexander William Williamson, chemist
- 1874: John Tyndall, physicist
- 1875: Sir John Hawkshaw, civil engineer
- 1876: Thomas Andrews, chemist
- 1877: Allen Thomson
- 1878: William Spottiswoode, mathematician
- 1879: George James Allman, naturalist
- 1880: Sir Andrew Crombie Ramsay, geologist
- 1881: John Lubbock, 1st Baron Avebury
- 1882: C. W. Siemens, engineer
- 1883: Arthur Cayley, mathematician
- 1884: John William Strutt, 3rd Baron Rayleigh, physicist
- 1885: Lyon Playfair, 1st Baron Playfair
- 1886: Sir John William Dawson, geologist
- 1887: Sir Henry Enfield Roscoe, chemist
- 1888: Sir Frederick Bramwell, civil engineer
- 1889: Sir William Henry Flower, anatomist
- 1890: Sir William Huggins, astronomer
- 1891: Sir Frederick August Abel
- 1892: Sir Archibald Geikie, geologist
- 1893: Sir John Scott Burdon-Sanderson, medical doctor
- 1894: Robert Gascoyne-Cecil, 3rd Marquess of Salisbury
- 1895: Captain Sir Douglas Strutt Galton, civil engineer
- 1896: Joseph Lister, 1st Baron Lister
- 1897: John Evans, archaeologist
- 1898: Sir William Crookes FRS, chemist and physicist
- 1899: Sir Michael Foster, physiologist
Presidents 1900–1949
- 1900: Sir William Turner, anatomist and vice-chancellor from 1903 to 1916 of the University of Edinburgh
- 1901: Arthur William Rücker, physicist
- 1902: Sir James Dewar, chemist and physicist
- 1903: Sir Norman Lockyer, astronomer and physicist
- 1904: Arthur James Balfour
- 1905: Sir George Darwin, older brother of Francis
- 1906: Sir Ray Lankester, zoologist
- 1907: Sir David Gill CB, astronomer
- 1908: Sir Francis Darwin, son of Charles
- 1909: Sir J. J. Thomson, physicist
- 1910: Rev. Professor Thomas George Bonney, geologist
- 1911: Sir William Ramsay, chemist
- 1912: Edward Albert Schäfer, physiologist
- 1913: Sir Oliver Lodge, physicist
- 1914: William Bateson, geneticist
- 1915: Sir Arthur Schuster, physicist
- 1916–1919: Sir Charles Algernon Parsons, engineer
- 1916: Sir Arthur Evans, archaeologist
- 1920: William Abbott Herdman, oceanographer
- 1921: Sir T. Edward Thorpe, chemist
- 1922: Professor Sir Charles Scott Sherrington, neuroscientist
- 1923: Professor Sir Ernest Rutherford, physicist
- 1924: Major-General Sir David Bruce, microbiologist
- 1925: Sir Horace Lamb, physicist
- 1926: Edward, Prince of Wales
- 1927: Prof Sir Arthur Keith, anatomist and anthropologist
- 1928: Sir William Henry Bragg, physicist
- 1929: Sir Thomas Henry Holland, geologist
- 1930: Frederick Orpen Bower, botanist
- 1931: General Jan Christiaan Smuts
- 1932: Sir James Alfred Ewing, physicist and vice-chancellor from 1916 to 1929 of the University of Edinburgh
- 1933: Sir Frederick Gowland Hopkins, Nobel Prize winning (1929) biochemist who discovered vitamins
- 1934: Sir James Hopwood Jeans, astronomer
- 1935: William Whitehead Watts, geologist
- 1936: Josiah Stamp, 1st Baron Stamp, statistician
- 1937: Sir Edward Bagnall Poulton, evolutionary biologist
- 1938: Robert Strutt, 4th Baron Rayleigh, physicist and son of Nobel Prize–winning John William Strutt, 3rd Baron Rayleigh
- 1939–1946: Sir Albert Seward, geologist
- 1946–1947: Sir Henry Dale, physiologist
- 1947–48: Sir Henry Tizard, chemist and inventor
- 1948–49: Sir E. John Russell, agriculturalist
- 1949–50: Sir Harold Hartley, physical chemist
Presidents 1950–1999
- 1950–51: Prince Philip, Duke of Edinburgh
- 1951–52: Archibald Vivian Hill, physiologist
- 1952–53: Sir Edward Victor Appleton, Nobel Prize winning (1947) physicist
- 1953–54: Edgar Adrian, 1st Baron Adrian, neuroscientist
- 1954–55: Sir Robert Robinson, chemist
- 1955–56: Sir Raymond Priestley, geologist and vice-chancellor from 1938 to 1952 of the University of Birmingham
- 1956–57: Patrick Blackett, Baron Blackett, physicist
- 1957–58: Alexander Fleck, 1st Baron Fleck, industrial chemist
- 1958–59: Sir James Gray, zoologist
- 1959–60: Sir George Paget Thomson, physicist
- 1960–61: Sir Wilfrid Le Gros Clark, primatologist and palaeoanthropologist
- 1961–62: Sir John Cockcroft CBE, Nobel Prize winning (1951) physicist
- 1962–63: Eric Ashby, Baron Ashby, llVice-chancellor from 1950 to 1959 of Queen's University Belfast
- 1963–64: Russell Brain, 1st Baron Brain, neurologist
- 1964–65: Sir Cyril Norman Hinshelwood, Nobel Prize winning (1956) chemist
- 1965–66: Sir Joseph Hutchinson, biologist
- 1966–67: Willis Jackson, Baron Jackson of Burnley, technologist and electrical engineer
- 1967–68: Dame Kathleen Lonsdale, physicist who discovered the cyclic nature of benzene in 1929
- 1968–69: Sir Peter Medawar, zoologist and immunologist
- 1969–70: Alexander R. Todd, Baron Todd, Nobel Prize winning (1957) biochemist known for nucleotides and coenzymes
- 1970–71: Sir Alexander Cairncross, economist
- 1971–72: Sir Vivian Fuchs, explorer
- 1972–73: Sir Kingsley Charles Dunham, geologist and mineralogist
- 1973–74: Sir John Kendrew, Nobel Prize winning (1962) biochemist who discovered the structure of myoglobin
- 1974–75: Sir Bernard Lovell, astronomer
- 1975–76: John Baker, Baron Baker, structural engineer known for limit state design
- 1976–77: Sir Andrew Huxley, Nobel Prize winning (1963) physiologist, known for discovering nerve action potentials
- 1977–78: Prof Dorothy Hodgkin, Nobel Prize winning (1964) chemist
- 1978–79: Frank Kearton, Baron Kearton,
- 1979–80: Frederick Dainton, Baron Dainton
- 1980–81: HRH the Duke of Kent
- 1981–82: Prof Sir Charles Frederick Carter, economist
- 1982–83: Sir Basil John Mason, general from 1965 to 1983 of the Met Office
- 1983–84: Sir Alastair Pilkington, inventor
- 1984–85: Prof Sir Hans Kornberg, biochemist
- 1985–86: Prof George Porter, Baron Porter of Luddenham, Nobel Prize winning (1967) chemist
- 1986–87 Sir Kenneth Durham, Chairman from 1982 to 1986 of Unilever
- 1987–88: Sir Walter Bodmer, geneticist
- 1988–89: Sir Samuel Edwards, physicist
- 1989–90: Claus Moser, Baron Moser, director from 1967 to 1978 of the Central Statistical Office
- 1990–91: Sir Denis Rooke
- 1991–92 Sir David Attenborough
- 1992–93: Sir David Weatherall, haemotologist
- 1993–94: Dame Anne McLaren, IVF biologist
- 1994–95: Sir Martin Rees, Baron Rees of Ludlow, astrophysicist
- 1995–96: Ronald Oxburgh, Baron Oxburgh, geologist and Rector of Imperial College London from 1993 to 2000
- 1996–97: Sir Derek Roberts, electronics engineer, and Provost of UCL from 1989 to 1999
- 1997–98 Prof Colin Blakemore, neuroscientist
- 1998–99: Sir Richard Sykes, biochemist and chief executive from 1993 to 1997 of Glaxo
- 1999–2000: Anne, Princess Royal
Presidents 2000–2009
- 2000–01: Sir William Stewart, Government Chief Scientific Adviser from 1990 to 1995
- 2001–02: Sir Howard Newby, sociologist
- 2002–03: Sir Peter Williams, physicist
- 2003–04: Dame Julia Higgins
- 2004–05: Prof Robert Winston, Lord Winston of Hammersmith
- 2005–06: Frances Cairncross, economist
- 2006–07: John Browne, Lord Browne of Madingley
- 2007–08: Sir David King, Government Chief Scientific Adviser from 2000 to 2008
- 2009–10: Robert May, Baron May of Oxford
Presidents 2010–2019
- 2010–11: David Sainsbury, Lord Sainsbury of Turville
- 2011–12: Professor Dame Jocelyn Bell Burnell
- 2012–13: John Krebs, Baron Krebs
- 2013–14: Lisa Jardine, historian
- 2014–15: Sir Paul Nurse, President from 2010 to 2015 of the Royal Society, and joint winner of the 2001 Nobel Prize in Physiology or Medicine (for work on cell cycle division)
- 2015–16 Dame Athene Donald, physicist and master since 2014 of Churchill College, Cambridge
- 2016–17: Dame Nancy Rothwell, physiologist and president and vice-chancellor of the University of Manchester
- 2017–18: Dame Uta Frith, developmental psychologist
- 2018–19: Professor Jim Al-Khalili, physicist and broadcaster
- 2019–20: Professor Alice Roberts anatomist and broadcaster
Presidents 2020–2029
- 2020–21: Ara Darzi, Baron Darzi of Denham
- 2021–22: Maggie Aderin-Pocock
- 2022–23: Anne-Marie Imafidon
- 2023–24: Professor Dame Jane Francis
- 2024–25: Professor Kevin Fenton

== List of annual meetings ==
- 1831 (1st meeting) York, England.
- 1832 (2nd meeting) Oxford, England.
Meetings from 1833 to 2012
- 1833 (3rd meeting) Cambridge, England.
- 1834 (4th meeting) Edinburgh, Scotland.
- 1835 (5th meeting) Dublin, Ireland.
- 1836 (6th meeting) Bristol, England.
- 1837 (7th meeting) Liverpool, England.
- 1838 (8th meeting) Newcastle upon Tyne, England.
- 1839 (9th meeting) Birmingham, England.
- 1840 (10th meeting) Glasgow, Scotland.
- 1841 (11th meeting) Plymouth, England.
- 1842 (12th meeting) Manchester.
- 1843 (13th meeting) Cork, Ireland.
- 1844 (14th meeting) York, England.
- 1845 (15th meeting) Cambridge, England.
- 1846 (16th meeting) Southampton, England.
- 1847 (17th meeting) Oxford, England.
- 1848 (18th meeting) Swansea, Wales.
- 1849 (19th meeting) Birmingham, England.
- 1850 (20th meeting) Edinburgh, Scotland.
- 1851 (21st meeting) Ipswich, England.
- 1852 (22nd meeting) Belfast, Northern Ireland.
- 1853 (23rd meeting) Hull, England.
- 1854 (24th meeting) Liverpool, England.
- 1855 (25th meeting) Glasgow, Scotland.
- 1856 (26th meeting) Cheltenham, England.
- 1857 (27th meeting) Dublin, Ireland.
- 1858 (28th meeting) Leeds, England.
- 1859 (29th meeting) Aberdeen, Scotland.
- 1860 (30th meeting) Oxford, England.
- 1861 (31st meeting) Manchester, England.
- 1862 (32nd meeting) Cambridge, England.
- 1863 (33rd meeting) Newcastle upon Tyne, England.
- 1864 (34th meeting) Bath, England.
- 1865 (35th meeting) Birmingham, England.
- 1866 (36th meeting) Nottingham, England.
- 1867 (37th meeting) Dundee, Scotland.
- 1868 (38th meeting) Norwich, England.
- 1869 (39th meeting) Exeter, England.
- 1870 (40th meeting) Liverpool, England.
- 1871 (41st meeting) Edinburgh, Scotland.
- 1872 (42nd meeting) Brighton, England.
- 1873 (43rd meeting) Bradford, England.
- 1874 (44th meeting) Belfast, Northern Ireland.
- 1875 (45th meeting) Bristol, England.
- 1876 (46th meeting) Glasgow, Scotland.
- 1877 (47th meeting) Plymouth, England.
- 1878 (48th meeting) Dublin, Ireland.
- 1879 (49th meeting) Sheffield, England.
- 1880 (50th meeting) Swansea, Wales.
- 1881 (51st meeting) York, England.
- 1882 (52nd meeting) Southampton, England.
- 1883 (53rd meeting) Southport, England.
- 1884 (54th meeting) Montreal, Quebec, Canada.
- 1885 (55th meeting) Aberdeen, Scotland.
- 1886 (56th meeting) Birmingham, England.
- 1887 (57th meeting) Manchester, England.
- 1888 (58th meeting) Bath, England.
- 1889 (59th meeting) Newcastle upon Tyne, England.
- 1890 (60th meeting) Leeds, England.
- 1891 (61st meeting) Cardiff, Wales.
- 1892 (62nd meeting) Edinburgh, Scotland.
- 1893 (63rd meeting) Nottingham, England.
- 1894 (64th meeting) Oxford, England.
- 1895 (65th meeting) Ipswich, England.
- 1896 (66th meeting) Liverpool, England.
- 1897 (67th meeting) Toronto, Ontario, Canada.
- 1898 (68th meeting) Bristol, England.
- 1899 (69th meeting) Dover, England.
- 1900 (70th meeting) Bradford, England.
- 1901 (71st meeting) Glasgow, Scotland.
- 1902 (72nd meeting) Belfast, Northern Ireland.
- 1903 (73rd meeting) Southport, England.
- 1904 (74th meeting) Cambridge, England.
- 1905 (75th meeting) Various, South Africa.
- 1906 (76th meeting) York, England.
- 1907 (77th meeting) Leicester, England.
- 1908 (78th meeting) Dublin, Ireland.
- 1909 (79th meeting) Winnipeg, Manitoba, Canada.
- 1910 (80th meeting) Sheffield, England.
- 1911 (81st meeting) Portsmouth, England.
- 1912 (82nd meeting) Dundee, Scotland.
- 1913 (83rd meeting) Birmingham, England.
- 1914 (84th meeting) Various, Australia.
- 1915 (85th meeting) Manchester, England.
- 1916 (86th meeting) Newcastle upon Tyne, England.
- 1917 No meeting
- 1918 No meeting
- 1919 (87th meeting) Bournemouth, England.
- 1920 (88th meeting) Cardiff, Wales.
- 1921 (89th meeting) Edinburgh, Scotland.
- 1922 (90th meeting) Hull, England.
- 1923 (91st meeting) Liverpool, England.
- 1924 (92nd meeting) Toronto, Ontario, Canada.
- 1925 (93rd meeting) Southampton, England.
- 1926 (94th meeting) Oxford, England.
- 1927 (95th meeting) Leeds, England.
- 1928 (96th meeting) Glasgow, Scotland.
- 1929 (97th meeting) Various, South Africa.
- 1930 (98th meeting) Bristol, England.
- 1931 (99th meeting) London, England.
- 1932 (100th meeting) York, England.
- 1933 (101st meeting) Leicester, England.
- 1934 (102nd meeting) Aberdeen, Scotland.
- 1935 (103rd meeting) Norwich, England.
- 1936 (104th meeting) Blackpool, England.
- 1937 (105th meeting) Nottingham, England.
- 1938 (106th meeting) Cambridge, England.
- 1939 (107th meeting) Dundee, Scotland.
- 1940 No meeting
- 1941 No meeting
- 1942 No meeting
- 1943 No meeting
- 1944 No meeting
- 1945 No meeting
- 1946 No full meeting (An abbreviated one-day meeting was held in London on 20 July 1946; Sir Henry Dale was elected the new president.)
- 1947 (109th meeting) Dundee, Scotland.
- 1948 (110th meeting) Brighton, England.
- 1949 (111th meeting) Newcastle upon Tyne, England.
- 1950 (112th meeting) Birmingham, England.
- 1951 (113th meeting) Edinburgh, Scotland.
- 1952 (114th meeting) Belfast, Northern Ireland.
- 1953 (115th meeting) Liverpool, England.
- 1954 (116th meeting) Oxford, England.
- 1955 (117th meeting) Bristol, England.
- 1956 (118th meeting) Sheffield, England.
- 1957 (119th meeting) Dublin, Ireland.
- 1958 (120th meeting) Glasgow, Scotland.
- 1959 (121st meeting) York, England.
- 1960 (122nd meeting) Cardiff, England.
- 1961 (123rd meeting) Norwich, England.
- 1962 (124th meeting) Manchester, England.
- 1963 (125th meeting) Aberdeen, Scotland.
- 1964 (126th meeting) Southampton, England.
- 1965 (127th meeting) Cambridge, England.
- 1966 (128th meeting) Nottingham, England.
- 1967 (129th meeting) Leeds, England.
- 1968 (130th meeting) Dundee, Scotland.
- 1969 (131st meeting) Exeter, England.
- 1970 (132nd meeting) Durham, England.
- 1971 (133rd meeting) Swansea, Wales.
- 1972 (134th meeting) Leicester, England.
- 1973 (135th meeting) Canterbury, England.
- 1974 (136th meeting) Stirling, Scotland.
- 1975 (137th meeting) Guildford, England.
- 1976 (138th meeting) Lancaster, England.
- 1977 (139th meeting) Birmingham, England.
- 1978 (140th meeting) Bath, England.
- 1979 (141st meeting) Edinburgh, Scotland.
- 1980 (142nd meeting) Salford, England.
- 1981 (143rd meeting) York, England.
- 1982 (144th meeting) Liverpool, England.
- 1983 (145th meeting) Brighton, England.
- 1984 (146th meeting) Norwich, England.
- 1985 (147th meeting) Glasgow, Scotland.
- 1986 (148th meeting) Bristol, England.
- 1987 (149th meeting) Belfast, Northern Ireland.
- 1988 (150th meeting) Oxford, England.
- 1989 (151st meeting) Sheffield, England.
- 1990 (151st meeting) Swansea, Wales.
- 1991 (152nd meeting) Plymouth, England.
- 1992 (153rd meeting) Southampton, England.
- 1993 (154th meeting) Keele, England.
- 1994 (155th meeting) Loughborough, England.
- 1995 (156th meeting) Newcastle upon Tyne, England.
- 1996 (157th meeting) Birmingham, England.
- 1997 (158th meeting) Leeds, England.
- 1998 (159th meeting) Cardiff, Wales.
- 1999 (160th meeting) Sheffield, England.
- 2000 (161st meeting) London, England.
- 2001 (162nd meeting) Glasgow, Scotland.
- 2002 (163rd meeting) Leicester, England.
- 2003 (164th meeting) Salford, England.
- 2004 (165th meeting) Exeter, England.
- 2005 (166th meeting) Dublin, Ireland.
- 2006 (167th meeting) Norwich, England.
- 2007 (168th meeting) York, England.
- 2008 (169th meeting) Liverpool, England.
- 2009 (170th meeting) Guildford, England.
- 2010 (171st meeting) Birmingham, England.
- 2011 (172nd meeting) Bradford, England.
- 2012 (173rd meeting) Aberdeen, Scotland.
- 2013 (174th meeting) Newcastle upon Tyne, England.
- 2014 (175th meeting) Birmingham, England.
- 2015 (176th meeting) Bradford, England
- 2016 (177th meeting) Swansea, Wales
- 2017 (178th meeting) Brighton, England
- 2018 (179th meeting) Hull, England
- 2019 (180th meeting) Coventry, England
- 2020 No meeting due to the COVID pandemic
- 2021 (181st meeting) Chelmsford, Essex, England
- 2022 (182nd meeting) Leicester, England
- 2023 (183rd meeting) Exeter, England
- 2024 (184th meeting) East London, England
- 2025 (185th meeting) Liverpool, England
- 2026 (186th meeting) Southampton, England

== Structure ==
The organisation is administered from the Wellcome Wolfson Building at the Science Museum, London in South Kensington in Kensington and Chelsea, within a few feet of the northern boundary with the City of Westminster (in which most of the neighbouring Imperial College London is resident).

== See also ==
- 1860 Oxford evolution debate
- American Association for the Advancement of Science
- Association of British Science Writers
- Café Scientifique
- EuroScience
- Glossary of astronomy
- Glossary of biology
- Glossary of chemistry
- Glossary of engineering
- Glossary of physics
- Guildhall Lectures
- National Science Week
- Royal Institution
- Royal Society
- Scandinavian Scientist Conference (1839–1936)
- Science Abstracts
- Science Festival
