= Robin Nicholson =

Robin Nicholson may refer to:

- Robin Nicholson (novelist) (1930—2017), pseudonym of the British writer Christopher Nicole
- Sir Robin Nicholson (metallurgist) (1934–2024), British metallurgist
