= F. Yates =

F. Yates is the name of:

- Frances Yates (1899–1981), British historian
- Frank Yates (1902–1994), pioneer of 20th century statistics
