= S. Gill =

S. Gill may refer to:

- S. Gill (Berkshire cricketer)
- S. Gill, President of the British Computer Society

== See also ==
- Gill (name)#People with the surname Gill
