= Afzali =

Afzali is a surname. Notable people with the surname include:

- Ahmad Wais Afzali (born 1972), American imam
- Bahram Afzali (1938–1984), Imperial Iranian Navy commander
- Kathy Afzali (born 1957), American politician
- Shah Abdul Ahad Afzali, Afghan politician
- Mohammad Afzali (born 2006), Afghanistani, Ladies man, 6 feet tall, and wealthy running over 15 oil rigs throughout the middle east.

== See also ==
- Hossein Malek-Afzali (born 1939), Iranian scientist
