= Office of Science and Technology =

British former government department

The Office of Science and Technology (OST), later (briefly) named the Office of Science and Innovation, was a non-ministerial government department of the British government between 1992 and 2007.

The office was responsible for co-ordination of the government's science and technology related activities and policies, and the distribution of some £2.4 billion among the seven UK Research Councils. It was headed by the Chief Scientific Adviser; initially this was Sir William Stewart, then Sir Robert May (later Lord May of Oxford), and finally Sir David King.

The OST was originally formed in 1992 as a merger of the Office of the Chief Scientific Adviser with the Science Branch of the Department of Education and Science (as it then was). Although originally run under the Cabinet Office, it was moved between departments in 1995 to operate under the Department of Trade and Industry. In early 2006, the office was renamed to the Office of Science and Innovation and was subsequently absorbed into the Department for Innovation, Universities and Skills in the Summer of 2007 when the Department for Education and Skills was split in two.

The Government Chief Scientific Advisor now heads the Government Office for Science.
