= Varsha Deshpande =

Indian advocate and women's rights activist

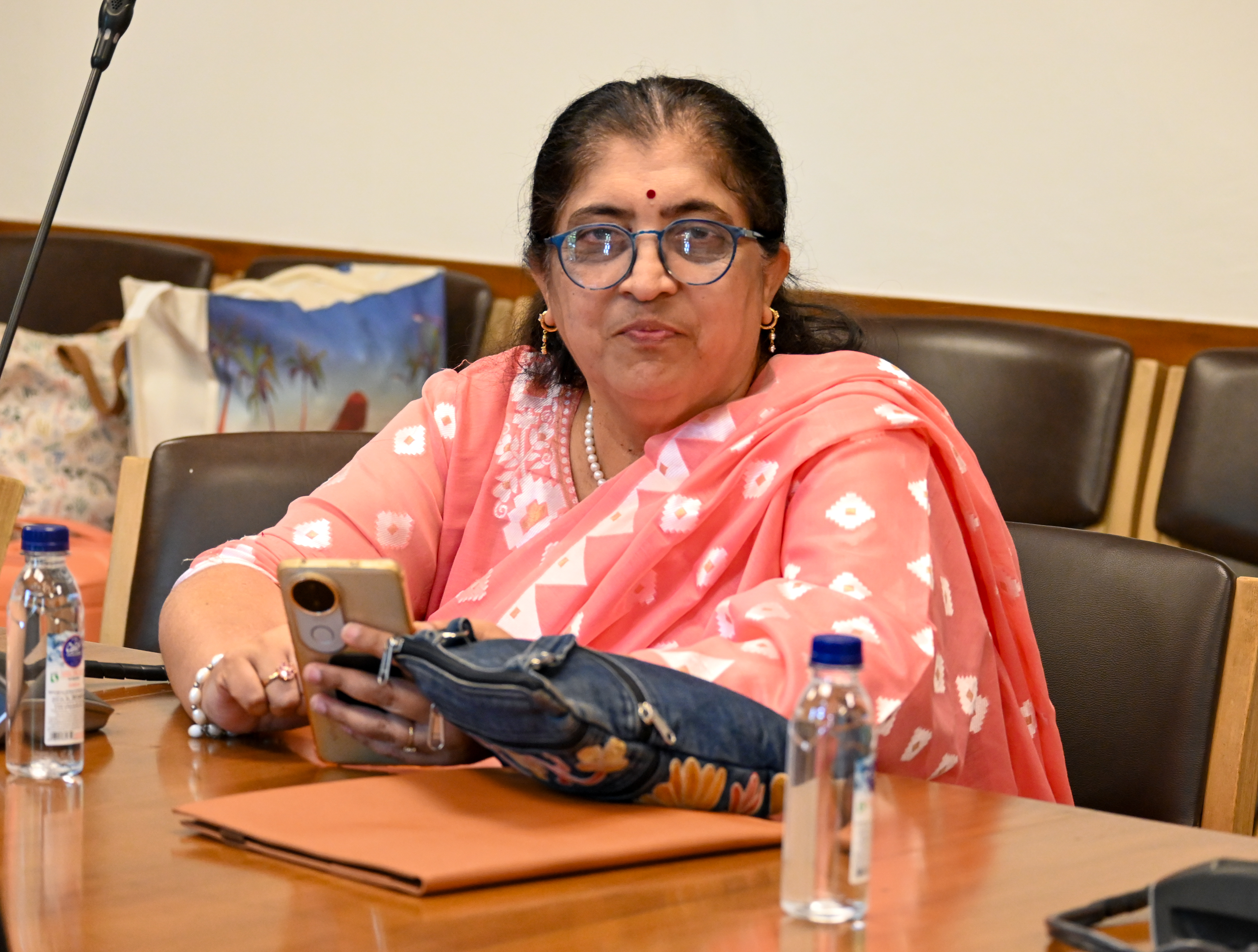
- Deshpande in June 2026
- Occupations: advocate, women's rights activist
- Spouse: Sanjiv Bonde

Varsha Deshpande is an Indian advocate and women's rights activist known for her work against female foeticide. She founded the Dalit Mahila Vikas Mandal and the Lek Ladki Abhiyan, through which she has conducted more than 50 decoy operations against illegal sex-selective abortion. In 2025, she became the third Indian to receive the United Nations Population Award for her contributions to gender equality.

== Personal life ==
Varsha Deshpande was born in Belgaum, Karnataka, and pursued education in law. She moved to Satara, in Maharashtra, after her marriage to Sanjiv Bonde.

== Career ==
After her undergraduate studies, Varsha Deshpande started a mini-library called Pratishabda, aiming to bring together literature written by women and about them. She began her career as a teacher of the English language at a local school. She founded Dalit Mahila Vikas Mandal in 1990 to work on gender justice and the empowerment of marginalised women through grassroots mobilisation, education, and legal reform. The organisation began by surveying women in Satara whose husbands had left them, and seeking support for them.

Deshpande has been called an authority on the Pre-Conception Pre-Natal Diagnostics Technique. She and her team would initially file cases against doctors and practitioners who violated the law, which was subsequently formalised as Lek Ladki Abhiyan initiative in 2004. She and her team had carried out more than 42 sting operations against maternity homes and centers that conducted abortions based on sex determination by 2014, and by September 2024, the number of these decoy operations was more than 50. She has also worked on preventing child marriages.

In May 2016, she alleged that Shah Rukh Khan and his wife had violated the PCPNDT act in determining the sex of their son AbRam. Her complaints were dismissed by a lower court, and then her request for seeking documents related to the baby boy was turned down by a magistrate. She subsequently moved to the Bombay High Court seeking documents collected by the Municipal Corporation of Greater Mumbai (MCGM) related to the surrogacy process before AbRam's birth. MCGM reported nothing untoward, and the High Court reserved its orders.

== Awards ==
On 10 July 2025, she received the United Nations Population Award in an individual category for her work in promoting gender equality. She became the third Indian to receive this award, preceded by Indira Gandhi and JRD Tata.
