= List of presidents of the British Computer Society =

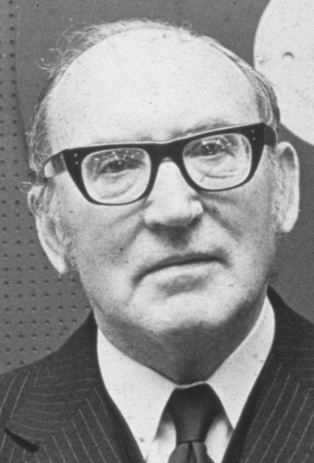
Prof. Sir Maurice Wilkes, the first president of the BCS

Below is a list of presidents of the British Computer Society from the inception of the BCS in 1957 onwards, with years of office.

- 1957–1960 Prof. Sir Maurice V. Wilkes
- 1960–1961 Frank Yates
- 1961–1962 Dudley Hooper
- 1962–1963 Sid Michaelson
- 1963–1965 Sir Edward Playfair
- 1965–1966 Sir Maurice Banks
- 1966–1967 Louis Mountbatten, 1st Earl Mountbatten of Burma
- 1967–1968 Stanley Gill
- 1968–1969 Basil de Ferranti
- 1969–1970 John Giffard, 3rd Earl of Halsbury
- 1970–1971 Alexander D'Agapeyeff
- 1971–1972 Sandy Douglas
- 1972–1973 Graham Morris
- 1973–1974 Ray Barrington
- 1974–1975 Ewart Willey
- 1975–1976 Cecil Marks
- 1976–1977 Gerry Fisher
- 1977–1978 Paul Samet
- 1978–1979 Frank Sumner
- 1979–1980 Julian Bogod
- 1980–1981 Frank Hooper
- 1981–1982 Peter Hall
- 1982–1983 Prince Edward, Duke of Kent
- 1983–1984 David Firnberg
- 1984–1985 Ewan Page
- 1985–1986 Robert McLaughlin
- 1986–1987 Sir John Fairclough
- 1987–1988 Ernest Morris
- 1988–1989 Brian Oakley
- 1989–1990 Dame Stephanie Shirley
- 1990–1991 Alan Roussel
- 1991–1992 Stephen Matheson
- 1992–1993 Roger Johnson
- 1993–1994 John Leighfield
- 1994–1995 David Mann
- 1995–1996 Geoff Robinson
- 1996–1997 Ron McQuaker
- 1997–1998 Sir Brian Jenkins
- 1998–1999 Ian Ritchie
- 1999–2000 David Hartley
- 2000–2001 Alastair Macdonald
- 2001–2002 Geoff McMullen
- 2002–2003 John Ivinson
- 2003–2004 Prof. Dame Wendy Hall
- 2004–2005 David Morriss
- 2005–2006 Charles E. Hughes
- 2006–2007 Prof. Sir Nigel Shadbolt
- 2007–2008 Rachel Burnett
- 2008–2009 Alan Pollard
- 2009–2011 Elizabeth Sparrow
- 2011–2012 Prof. Jim Norton
- 2012–2013 Bob Harvey
- 2013–2014 Roger Marshall
- 2014–2015 Prof. Liz Bacon
- 2015–2016 Jos Creese
- 2016–2017 Ray Long
- 2017–2018 Paul Martynenko
- 2018–2019 Chris Rees
- 2019–2020 Michael Grant
- 2020–2021 Rebecca George
- 2021–2022 John Higgins
- 2022–2023 Mayank Prakash
- 2023–2024 Gillian Arnold
- 2024–2025 Alastair Revell
