= Merle S. Goldberg =

Merle S. Goldberg (April 13, 1936 – November 29, 1998) was an American journalist and an abortion activist. She was head of the National Women's Health Coalition which later became the International Women's Health Coalition. Goldberg also founded the first legal outpatient abortion clinic in the United States.

== Biography ==
Goldberg was born in New York City and later attended Brooklyn College. She had a master's degree from Columbia University. Goldberg was a former Newsday staff writer.

Goldberg created the National Women's Health Coalition which monitored abortion clinics and hospitals performing abortions in order to help maintain good standards of health. She also worked with various abortion providers, including Harvey Karman. Karman worked with Goldberg on menstrual extraction, which was called the "lunch-hour abortion." A menstrual extraction cost about $30, compared to the price of a regular abortion which ranged from $150 to $1,500.

Goldberg also collaborated with Karman in 1972 to help perform abortions on women in Bangladesh who had been raped by the Pakistani army. Sandra Kabir reported that hundreds of thousands of women had been raped in Bangladesh at this time. Later, Karman and Goldberg had a serious problem with an experimental abortion method known as the supercoil abortion which later caused dangerous side effects. Goldberg intended to help women from Chicago who were scheduled to have abortions, but whose clinic had been shut down. On the weekend of May 13, 1972, she brought the women to Philadelphia where Karman would use the supercoil method. The method had not been tested carefully prior to using it on the women from Chicago. Critics of the incident said that women were being experimented on, however, Goldberg insisted that they knew the risks going into the procedure. Karman and Goldberg again helped provide abortions in Cyprus in 1974 where women had been raped during the Turkish invasion.

Goldberg managed the United Nations 1975 Conference on the Status of Women. Goldberg later helped Kabir obtain funding to start the Bangladesh Women's Health Coalition in 1980.

Goldberg moved to Washington D.C. in 1984. She died at George Washington University Hospital of renal disease on November 29, 1998.
