= John Ashworth (biologist) =

British biochemist (1938–2025)

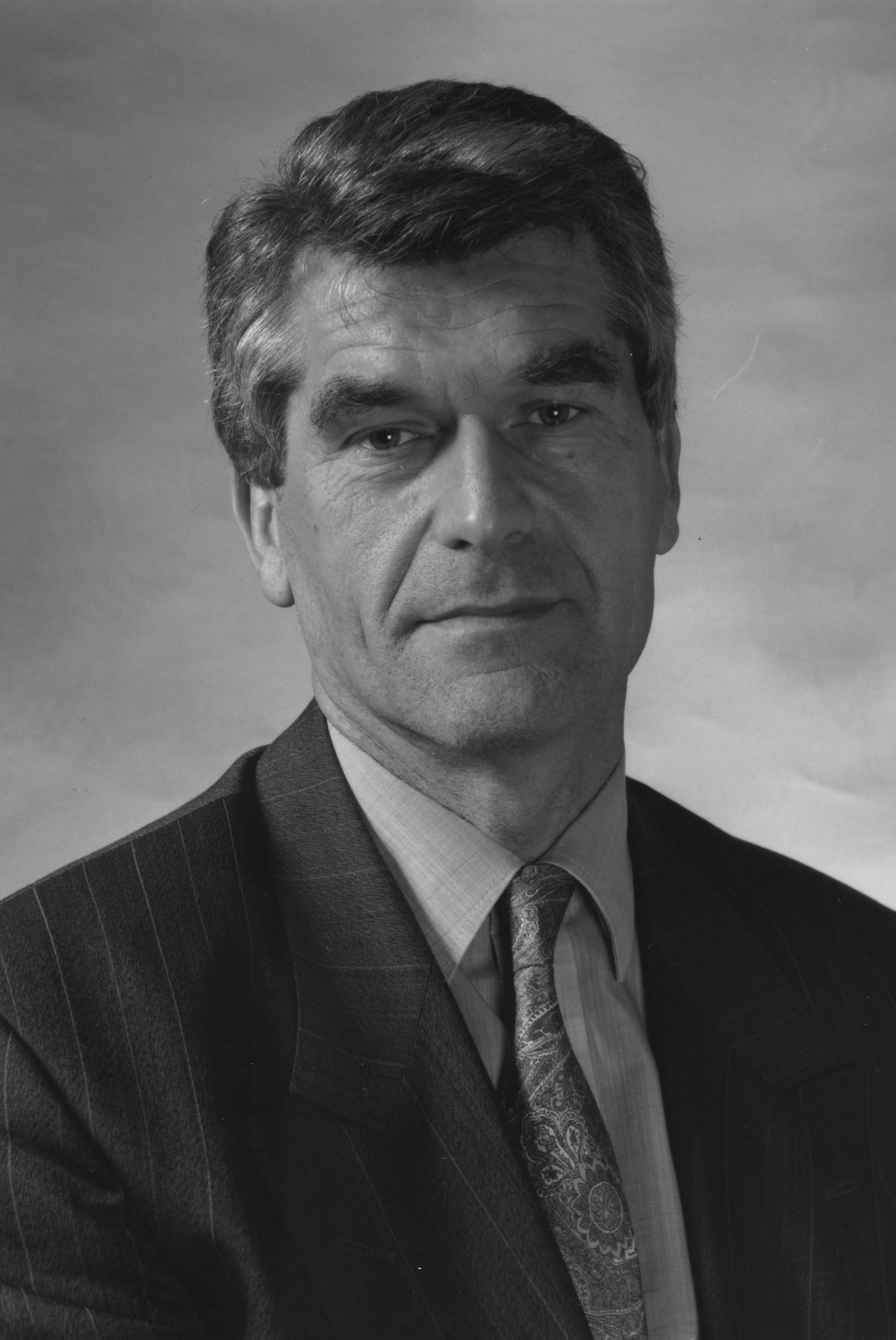
John Ashworth

Sir John Ashworth (27 November 1938 – 3 March 2025) was a British biochemist and educationalist.

== Early life and education ==
Ashworth was born on 27 November 1938. He was educated at West Buckland School and Exeter College, Oxford. Ashworth obtained a PhD degree in biochemistry at Leicester University and was a lecturer and reader there before taking up a post of foundation Professor of Biology at University of Essex in 1974. His scientific research at the time focused on developmental biology and cell differentiation, with a particular interest in the slime mold.

== Career ==
Ashworth joined the UK government's Cabinet Office in 1976, where he acted as the chief scientific adviser to the government, initially on secondment, and then as an undersecretary in the Cabinet Office from 1979 to 1981. He became vice-chancellor at the University of Salford from 1981 to 1990, and then director of the London School of Economics from 1990 to 1996.

Ashworth was a chairman of the British Library board 1996–2001, the Institute of Cancer Research (deputy chairman) 2003–07, and Barts and the London NHS Trust 2003–07.

Ashworth was a governor of the Ditchley Foundation and also chairman of the board of trustees at Richmond, The American International University in London, a private liberal arts and professional studies university based in Richmond upon Thames and Kensington.

== Personal life and death ==
Ashworth married Auriol Stevens on 23 July 1988. He lived in Wivenhoe in north-east Essex, close to his daughter and grandchildren. He died on 3 March 2025, at the age of 86.

== Honours ==
Ashworth was awarded an Honorary Doctor of Laws from the University of Leicester in 2005. He retired in 2007, and was awarded a knighthood for public services in the Queen's New Year Honours list 2008. He was made an Honorary Fellow of Exeter College, Oxford in 1983.

John Ashworth was elected membership of the Manchester Literary and Philosophical Society in 1981

Government offices
Preceded by Robert Press	Chief Scientific Adviser to the UK Government; 1976–1981	Succeeded by Sir Robin Nicholson
Educational offices
Preceded by Indraprasad Gordhanbhai Patel	Director of the London School of Economics; 1990–1996	Succeeded by Anthony Giddens
