= Joan Dunlop =

British activist

Joan Marie Dunlop (née Banks, May 20, 1934 – June 29, 2012) was a British women's health advocate and activist. She was the first president of the International Women's Health Coalition (IWHC).

== Early life and education ==
Dunlop was born in London to a British father, Sir Maurice Banks, and an American mother, Anne Banks.

As a young teenager, Dunlop visited the US, she then decided she wanted to live there. She applied and was accepted at Vassar College but her parents insisted that she attend the Queen's Secretarial College in London. As a young woman, she had an illegal abortion in England, and her experience "fueled her campaign to improve women's reproductive choices."

== Career ==
After graduation, she worked for the BBC before emigrating to America in 1960.

After a brief stint at a Manhattan advertising agency, Dunlop went to work at the Ford Foundation (1960-1967) as an administrative assistant to the Director of Public Affairs, Paul Ylvisaker, at a time when the Public Affairs Programs would soon serve as the model for President Lyndon Johnson's Great Society/War on Poverty programs. In the late-1960s, she worked for the City of New York in the Mayor's Office of the Budget and at the Fund for the City of New York.

Dunlop helped raise money for the New York Public Library and was an advisor to John D. Rockefeller III on population. She also worked in the budget office of the Mayor John V. Lindsay. While Dunlop was working for the Ford Foundation, she was told Rockefeller was interested in interviewing her for a position. During her interview with Rockefeller for the job as a population adviser, Dunlop told him the story of her abortion and later she said, "He listened with great attentiveness." Dunlop was hired by Rockefeller in 1973. She worked with Rockefeller on the Population Council where she helped expand research the council did and also promoted the idea that recognizing women's sexuality was important in population control.

Dunlop founded the International Women's Health Coalition (IWHC) in 1984. Part of her motivation in leaving a good job and taking on the task of running the IWHC was that she was "angry at the rise of the anti-abortion movement in the United States" which she considered an organizing tool for a conservative political agenda. She was a strong driving force behind the IWHC, changing what was at first a small project into a global women's health organization. She was a leading voice for women’s health and rights around the world and believed that “[t]his was not about abortion, this was about women.”

After retiring from the IWHC in 1998, she worked to put together a women's group to lobby for women's voices in United States foreign policy: A Women's Lens on Global Issues.

== Death ==
Dunlop died after a battle with cancer on June 29, 2012 in Connecticut.
