= Michael S. K. Grant =

British businessperson and IT professional

Michael Grant FBCS
- Occupations: Businessperson and IT professional
- Employer(s): Commodore, Gateway, Harvey Nash, Heinz, ICL, Lotus, Prime Computer, Redifon, Wang
- Known for: Master of WCIT; President of the BCS
- Awards: Honorary doctorate at Solent University (2019)
- Website: Michael S. K. Grant on X

Michael S. K. Grant is a British businessperson and IT professional who has been Master of the Worshipful Company of Information Technologists and President of the BCS.

Michael Grant is the son of an RAF corporal. He attended The King's School, a cathedral school in Rochester, where he became head boy. His first job was directly from school at Heinz. He later worked for Redifon in the area of flight simulation.

Michael Grant has worked at director and vice-president level for a number of IT companies such as Commodore, Gateway, ICL, Lotus, Prime Computer, Wang, etc. He was Clerk of the Worshipful Company of Information Technologists from 2004 to 2010 and subsequently Master during 2012–13. Later for the year 2019–20, he was President of the BCS.

Grant holds an honorary degree as a Doctor of Technology for his work in the industry from Solent University, awarded in 2019. He is also a ceremonial pikeman for the Lord Mayor of London. He is an Associate Director of Harvey Nash.

== See also ==
- List of presidents of the British Computer Society
