= Robert May, Baron May of Oxford =

Australian scientist, president of the Royal Society (1936–2020)

The Right Honourable The Lord May of Oxford OM AC FRS HonFREng FAA FTSE FRSN
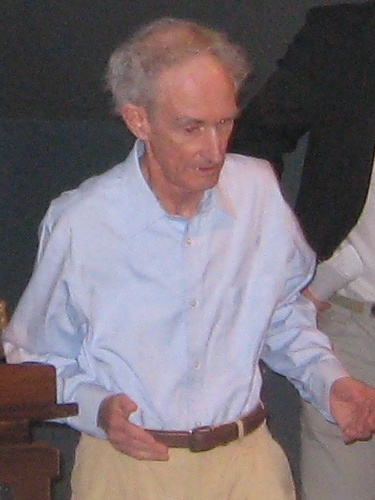
- May in 2009

59th President of the Royal Society
- In office 2000–2005
- Preceded by: Aaron Klug
- Succeeded by: Martin Rees

Member of the House of Lords
- Lord Temporal
- Life peerage 18 July 2001 – 2 May 2017

Personal details
- Born: Robert McCredie May; 8 January 1936 Sydney, New South Wales, Australia
- Died: 28 April 2020 (aged 84) Oxford, Oxfordshire, England
- Citizenship: Australia
- Scientific career
- Education: University of Sydney
- Known for: Logistic map, stability-complexity studies
- Spouse(s): Judith Feiner, Lady May (m. 1962)
- Awards: Crafoord Prize (1996); Balzan Prize; Copley Medal; UNSW Dirac Medal (2011); Life Peerage; Order of Merit; Companion of the Order of Australia; Pawsey Medal (1967); Knight Bachelor
- Fields: Theoretical ecology
- Workplaces: Imperial College London; University of Oxford; Harvard University
- Thesis: Investigations towards an understanding of superconductivity (1959)
- Doctoral students: George Sugihara; Marc Lipsitch
- Other notable students: Martin Nowak (postdoc)
- Website: www.zoo.ox.ac.uk/people/view/may_r.htm

Robert McCredie May, Baron May of Oxford (8 January 1936 – 28 April 2020) was an Australian scientist who was Chief Scientific Adviser to the UK Government, President of the Royal Society, and a professor at the University of Sydney and Princeton University. He held joint professorships at the University of Oxford and Imperial College London. He was also a crossbench member of the House of Lords from 2001 until his retirement in 2017.

May was a Fellow of Merton College, Oxford, and an appointed member of the council of the British Science Association. He was also a member of the advisory council for the Campaign for Science and Engineering.

== Early life and education ==
May was born in Sydney on 8 January 1936, to lawyer Henry Wilkinson May and Kathleen Mitchell (née McCredie), who divorced when he was seven years old. His father was of prosperous middle-class Northern Irish origin, and his mother was the daughter of a Scottish engineer. May was educated at Sydney Boys High School. He then attended the University of Sydney, where he studied chemical engineering and theoretical physics (BSc 1956) and received a PhD in theoretical physics in 1959. He was a patron of the Sydney High School Old Boys Union.

== Career and research ==
=== Career ===
The logistic map, pictured here, was a seminal discovery by May that demonstrated how even a simple equation could result in chaos.

Early in his career, May developed an interest in animal population dynamics and the relationship between complexity and stability in natural communities. He was able to make major advances in the field of population biology through the application of mathematical techniques. His work played a key role in the development of theoretical ecology through the 1970s and 1980s. He also applied these tools to the study of disease and to the study of biodiversity.

May was Gordon MacKay Lecturer in Applied Mathematics at Harvard University (1959–61) and returned to the University of Sydney (1962) as senior lecturer, reader, and professor (1969–72) in theoretical physics. From 1973 until 1988, he was Class of 1977 Professor of Zoology at Princeton University, serving as chairman of the University Research Board 1977–88. From 1988 until 1995, he held a Royal Society Research Professorship jointly at Imperial College London and the University of Oxford, where he became a fellow of Merton College and a Master of Arts. He was Chief Scientific Adviser to HM Government and head of the Office of Science and Technology (1995–2000), and president of the Royal Society (2000–2005).

=== Public life ===
May held subsidiary appointments as executive trustee of the Nuffield Foundation, member of the board of the United Kingdom Sports Institute, foundation trustee of the Gates Trust (University of Cambridge), chairman of the board of trustees of the Natural History Museum, trustee of the Royal Botanic Gardens, Kew, independent member of the Joint Nature Conservation Committee, trustee of World Wildlife Fund-UK, president of the British Ecological Society, and member of the Committee on Climate Change.

In 1996, May asked Ig Nobel to stop awarding prizes to British scientists because this might lead the public to treat worthwhile research less seriously (see Criticism of Ig Nobel).

=== Climate change co-operation ===
Although an atheist since his youth, May stated that religion may help society deal with climate change. While referring to what he believed to be a rigid structure of fundamentalist religion, he stated that the co-operational aspects of non-fundamentalist religion may in fact help with climate change. When asked if religious leaders should be doing more to persuade people to combat climate change, he stated that it was absolutely necessary.

=== Awards and honours ===
May was appointed Knight Bachelor in 1996, and a Companion of the Order of Australia in 1998. In 2001, on the recommendation of the House of Lords Appointments Commission, he was created a life peer. He was one of the first fifteen peers to be elevated in this manner. After his initial preference for "Baron May of Woollahra" failed an objection from the Protocol Office of the Australian Prime Minister's Department, he chose the style and title Baron May of Oxford, of Oxford in the County of Oxfordshire. He was made a member of the Order of Merit in 2002.

He was elected to the American Academy of Arts and Sciences in 1977 and to the Fellowship of the Royal Society in 1979. He became a Corresponding Fellow of the Australian Academy of Science in 1991, a Foreign Member of the United States National Academy of Sciences in 1992, a member of the American Philosophical Society in 2001, a member of the Academia Europaea in 1994, and Fellow of the Royal Society of New South Wales in 2010.

In 2005 he was appointed an Honorary Fellow of the Royal Academy of Engineering. In 2009 Lord May became only the 7th ever Honorary Fellow of the Australian Institute of Building (HonFAIB). He received honorary degrees from universities including Uppsala(1990), Yale (1993), Sydney (1995), Princeton (1996), and the Eidgenössische Technische Hochschule Zürich (2003). He was awarded the Weldon Memorial Prize by the University of Oxford (1980), an Award by the MacArthur Foundation (1984), the Medal of the Linnean Society of London (1991), the Marsh Christian Prize (1992), the Frink Medal by the Zoological Society of London (1995), the Crafoord Prize (1996), the Balzan Prize (1998) for Biodiversity and the Copley Medal by the Royal Society (2007) and the Lord Lewis Prize by the Royal Society of Chemistry (2008).

== Personal life ==
During his postdoctoral research at the Division of Engineering and Applied Physics at Harvard University as Gordon MacKay Lecturer in Applied Mathematics, between 1959 and 1961, May met his wife, Judith Feiner, a native of Manhattan. The Mays had a daughter, Naomi.

May died at a nursing home in Oxford of pneumonia complicated by Alzheimer's disease on 28 April 2020, aged 84.

== See also ==
- List of presidents of the Royal Society

Government offices
Preceded by Sir William Stewart	Chief Scientific Adviser to the UK Government; 1995–2000	Succeeded by Sir David King
Professional and academic associations
Preceded by Aaron Klug	59th President of the Royal Society; 2000–2005	Succeeded by Martin Rees
