= Guildhall Lectures =

The Guildhall Lectures were an annual series of talks on the theme of communication, organised by the British Association.

The lectures, held in the London Guildhall, were sponsored and broadcast by Granada Television. The first set of three lectures were held in 1959, and they continued until at least 1984. Broadly on the theme of "Communication in the Modern World", they concerned the arts, sciences, politics and mass media.

== List of lectures ==
Year	Theme	Speakers
1959	Communication in the Modern World	Edward Appleton, Eric Ashby, Edward Murrow
1960	Communication in the Modern World	Edgar Adrian, George W. Beadle, Hans Eysenck
1961	Communication in the Modern World	Hermann Bondi, James Gray, John Wolfenden
1962	Communication in the Modern World	John Kenneth Galbraith, Yoshinori Maeda, Yigael Yadin
1963	Communication in the Modern World	A. J. Ayer, Patrick Blackett, J. Zacharias
1964	Communication in the Modern World	William Holford, George Miller, Stein Rokkan
1965	Communication in the Modern World	Alistair Cooke, J. B. Rhine, Hyman G. Rickover
1966	Telecommunications: The Next Ten Years	Kenneth Clark, Sebastian De Ferranti, Francis McLean
1967	Only Connect	Asa Briggs, Hugh Cudlipp, Fred Friendly
1968	Communication in the Modern World	Lawrence Alloway, Paul Chambers, Richard Crossman
1969	Universities: Boundaries of Change	Paul Doty, Jack Straw, Albert Sloman
1970		
1971		
1972	The Future of Broadcasting in Britain	Hugh Greene
1973		
1974	The Freedom of the Press	Harold Evans, Katharine Graham, David Windlesham
1975	Government, Broadcasting and the Press	Roy Jenkins
1976		
1977	Television Today and Tomorrow	Noel Annan, Charles Curran, Brian Young
1978		
1979		
1980	The Role of the Trade Unions	Tony Benn, Len Murray, Jim Prior
1981		
1982	The Liberty of the Citizen	John Hunt, John Mortimer, Franklin A. Thomas
1983		
1984	The Right to Know	Floyd Abrams, Michael Kirby, Leslie Scarman
1985		
1986		
1987	Will Cabinet Government Survive?	Quintin Hogg
1988		
1989	Europe: Our Sort of Community	Leon Brittan
