= National Technology Adviser =

Adviser to the UK Prime Minister and the Cabinet

The national technology adviser (NTA) of the United Kingdom provides technology advice to the secretary of state for science, innovation and technology and the Cabinet of the United Kingdom.

The NTA works across government departments, including with the government chief scientific adviser to support the science and technology landscape.

== List of national technology advisers ==
- Liam Maxwell, 2016–2020
- Sir Patrick Vallance, 2020–2023
- Dave Smith, 2023–present

== See also ==
- Government Chief Scientific Adviser
