= Save a Child's Heart =

Israeli humanitarian organisation

- Abbreviation: SACH
- Formation: 1995
- Founder: Dr. Amram (Ami) Cohen
- Type: Humanitarian organization
- Headquarters: Wolfson Medical Center
- Location: Israel
- Fields: Medical
- President: Prof. Arie Schachner
- President of SACH Africa: Haim Taib

Save a Child's Heart (SACH) is an Israeli humanitarian organisation providing cardiac healthcare to children worldwide. it was founded in 1995 and is based at the Edith Wolfson Medical Center near Tel Aviv, Israel.

== Impact ==
Save A Child's Heart provides cardiac surgical and catheterization procedures for children from low-and-middle-income countries at the Save a Child's Heart International Pediatric Cardiac Center at the Sylvan Adams Children's Hospital in the Wolfson Medical Center in Holon, Israel, near Tel Aviv; It operates an in-depth outreach post-graduate fellowship training program in Israel for medical personnel from these developing countries. It has trained doctors from Ethiopia, Tanzania, and the Palestinian Authority to provide comprehensive pediatric cardiologists; It sends staff overseas to provide this education and mentorship to local medical professionals, as well as to perform surgeries side-by-side with them. It has sent numerous medical missions every year to many countries including Tanzania, Ethiopia, Zanzibar, and Romania.

As of December 2025, it has brought more than 8,000 children to Israel from 75 countries including Ethiopia, Gambia, Vietnam, Jordan, Moldova, Tanzania, Russia, the Philippines, Nigeria, Ghana, Kenya, Angola Iraq, Haiti, Saint Vincent and the Grenadines, Trinidad, Ecuador, Mauritania, Senegal, Côte d'Ivoire, Sierra Leone, Uganda, Democratic Republic of the Congo, Zimbabwe, Zambia, Rwanda, Somalia, Eritrea, Sri Lanka, China, Kazakhstan, Estwana, Romania, South Sudan, Ukraine, Syria and Somaliland, as well as from Gaza and the West Bank (the Palestinian Territories). Approximately 50% of the children are from the Palestinian Authority, Jordan, Iraq and Morocco, more than 30% are from Africa, and the remainder are from Asia, Eastern Europe, and the Americas. In December 2010 the first child from Indonesia was brought to Israel and underwent successful surgery in January 2011.

Its doctors and medical personnel volunteer their time and expertise, with the only costs (about $10,000 US) used to provide post-surgical care at its children's home in Israel for an average stay of about three months. Children are brought to Israel from their home country in groups of four to six, accompanied by a nurse or, if they are under age three, by a family member.

Save a Child's Heart Foundation U.S. has been certified by Independent Charities of America as one of about 2,000 “Best in America” charities, verification that its “fund-raising materials and other information to the public is truthful and non-deceptive” and that it provides “documented provision of substantive services.” Save a Child's Heart Foundation U.S. has received the Independent Charities Seal of Excellence.

It is the first and only Israeli organization to receive the United Nations Population Award for outstanding achievements in population and health providing free lifesaving heart treatments to children in need all over the world in 2018.

== Surgeries performed in Israel ==
Save a Child's Heart has treated over 8,000 children from 75 countries at the Wolfson Medical Center.

In 2013, amidst the Syrian Civil War, it conducted an open-heart surgery on a 5-year old Syrian girl. The pre-schooler, living as a refugee in an undisclosed country, traveled to the Wolfson Medical Hospital in Holon to receive the treatment. She was the first Syrian child to receive the free medical care and surgery.

== International activities ==
China – On November 16, 2008, it sent training and surgical mission to Shijiazhuang in the Hebei Province in China. This was its 8th mission to China where its medical teams have saved, with Chinese colleagues, more than 100 Chinese children.

Angola - On May 3, 2009, it sent medical team to Luanda, Angola, to examine and screen Angolan children. The team examined 88 children. Among them were children who had been treated in Israel and needed a follow-up examination.

Moldova – On November 11, 2007, it sent a team to Kishinev, Moldova, to work with a team of local pediatric cardiologists. The mixed surgical group examined children and performed surgeries for five days.

Tanzania – In August 2011, it send a team of Doctors, Nurses, Staff and Volunteers to Tanzania to the Bugando Medical Center to work alongside local partners. During this mission it, together with the local partners, screened 300 children and performed 12 surgeries on Ethiopian children. A week later, a team of its volunteers, doctors and staff climbed Mount Kilimanjaro in an effort to raise $1M to save the lives of African children in need. As of January 2018 it has sent 7 medical missions to Tanzania.

Romania - In 2017 there were two missions to Romania in March and November. During these missions, Israeli doctors traveled to help assist Romanian medical staff in performing over 11 life saving heart procedures as well as performing their own procedures.

Zanzibar - There have been approximately 10 medical missions to Zanzibar since 2008, the most recent being in 2020. Save a Child's Heart sent an all-women's mission to Zanzibar in mid-February 2017 to screen and diagnose children in need of life-saving heart procedures. It worked with its medical partners at the Mnazi Mmoia Hospital in Zanzibar to conduct screenings and determine which children are in need of heart surgeries. Throughout the mission, there were a total of 270 children in Zanzibar screened.

it Photo Exhibit Tours the Globe

Since 2008, a photo exhibit of its activities has been presented in cities around the world, including Abuja (Nigeria), Brussels, Detroit, Glasgow, Hebei (China), Jerusalem, Johannesburg, Melbourne, Miami, Moscow, Philadelphia, Quezon City (Philippines), Singapore, Sydney, Toronto, Vancouver and Washington, DC.
