= Adrienne Germain =

American activist

Adrienne Germain (1947 – May 19, 2022) was a women's health advocate and activist. She was the second president of the International Women's Health Coalition (IWHC). Germain was also a researcher and author.

== Biography ==
Germain earned a bachelor's degree from Wellesley College in 1969 and had a master's degree in sociology and demography from the University of California, Berkeley. Germain was the first woman to act as a representative of "any donor agency" in Bangladesh. Germain worked for the Ford Foundation for 14 years before she started working at the International Women's Health Coalition (IWHC). She was appointed vice president of IWHC in 1985. Germain worked as a strategist and adviser to the United States delegation at the International Conference on Population and Development in Cairo. Germain feels that it is essential for women's rights that women have the freedom to control their own bodies and full access to educational opportunities. She says, "If they are forced to have sex, denied information and protection about sexual diseases, it limits how they can be and act in the world."

Germain received the United Nations Population Award in June 2012 in recognition of her work in the field.

Germain died by suicide on May 19, 2022.

== Selected works ==
- Germain, Adrienne (1975-01-01). "Status and Roles of Women as Factors in Fertility Behavior: A Policy Analysis". Studies in Family Planning. 6 (7): 192–200. doi:10.2307/1965271. JSTOR 1965271. PMID 1162712.
- Reproductive Health and Dignity: Choices by Third World Women. New York: Population Council. 1987. OCLC 18386399.
- Reproductive Tract Infections: Global Impact and Priorities for Women's Reproductive Health. New York: Plenum Press. 1992. ISBN 9780306442414.
- Dixon-Mueller, Ruth; Germain, Adrienne (1992-01-01). "Stalking the Elusive "Unmet Need" for Family Planning". Studies in Family Planning. 23 (5): 330–335. doi:10.2307/1966531. JSTOR 1966531. PMID 1475801.
- Expanding Access to Safe Abortion: Strategies for Action. Theresa Kim. New York: International Women's Health Coalition. 1998. OCLC 41930803.
