= Maurice Banks =

Sir Maurice Alfred Lister Banks (11 August 1901 – 11 August 1991) was a British businessman.

Educated at Westminster School in London, Banks was a Director of Oakbank Oil Co. Ltd during 1962/3–1963, which became BP Exploration (Associated Holdings) in 1963. He was also a Director of Pumpherston Oil Co. Ltd over the same period. He was also Chairman of the Laird Group.

During 1965–66, Banks was President of the British Computer Society.

In the United Kingdom 1971 New Year's Honours List, Banks was knighted by Queen Elizabeth II as a Knight Bachelor for services to patent law. In 1972, he received the UK Businessman of the Year award, presented by George Brown at the Savoy Hotel in central London.

Maurice Banks was married to a United States citizen, Anne Banks. Health advocate and activist Joan Banks Dunlop (1934–2012) was their daughter.

== See also ==
- List of presidents of the British Computer Society
- 1971 New Year Honours
