= Mark Walport =

English medical scientist and immunologist

Professor Sir Mark Walport FRS FRCP FRCPath FMedSci FRSE
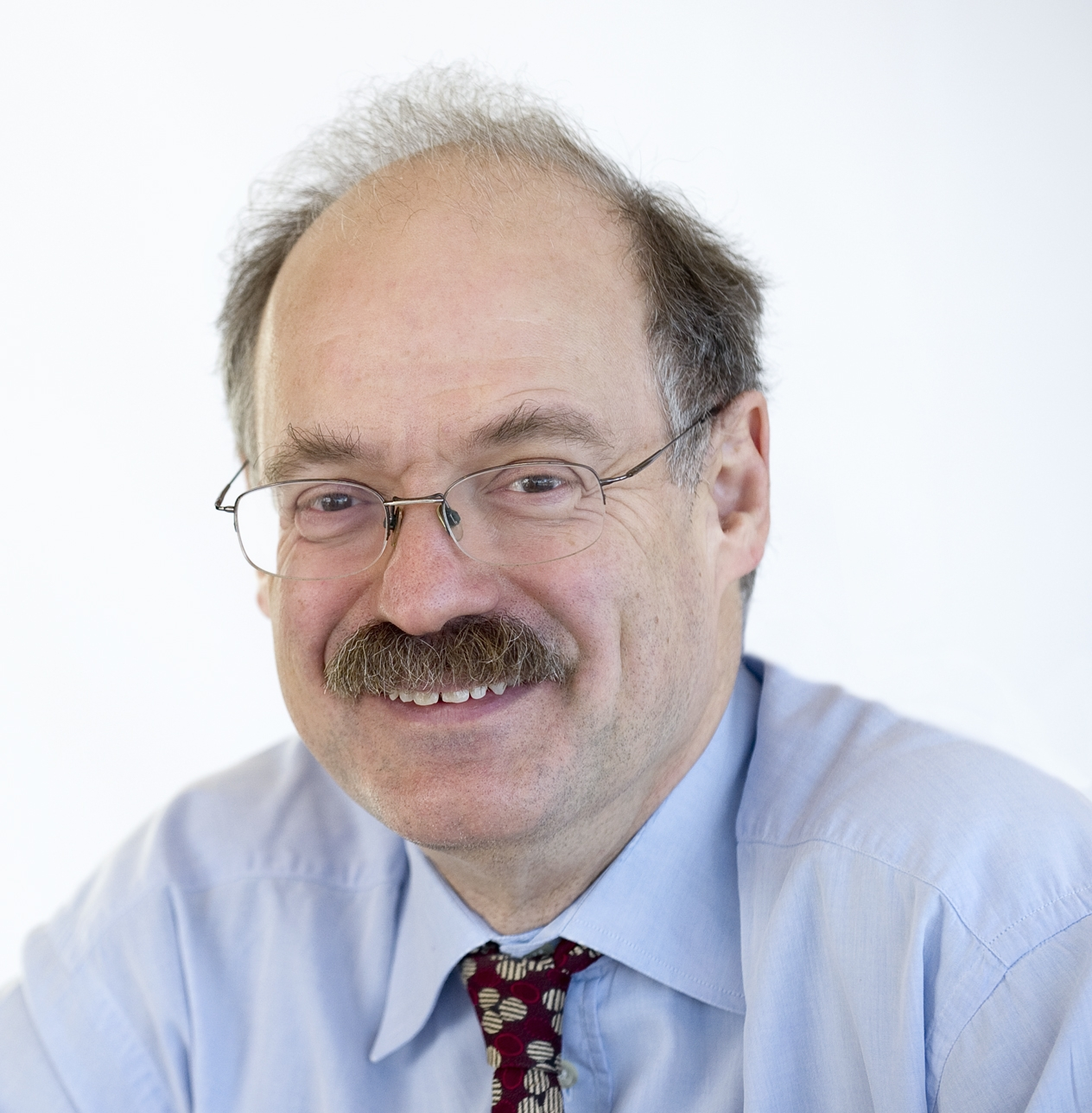
- Mark Walport
- Born: Mark Jeremy Walport; 25 January 1953 (age 73); London, England
- Education: St Paul's School, London
- Alma mater: University of Cambridge (PhD)
- Known for: Director of Wellcome Trust (2003–2013); Government Chief Scientific Adviser (2013–2017)
- Spouse: Julia Elizabeth Neild (m. 1986)
- Children: 4
- Awards: Fellow of the Academy of Medical Sciences (1998); Knight Bachelor (2009); Fellow of the Royal Society (2011)
- Scientific career
- Fields: Immunology; Rheumatology
- Institutions: Hammersmith Hospital; Royal Brompton Hospital; Guy's Hospital; Imperial College London; Imperial College School of Medicine; Wellcome Trust; University of Cambridge; Government of the United Kingdom
- Thesis: The biology of complement receptors (1986)
- Doctoral advisor: Peter Lachmann
- Website: gov.uk/government/people/mark-walport

Sir Mark Jeremy Walport (born 25 January 1953) is a British medical scientist and was the Government Chief Scientific Adviser in the United Kingdom from 2013 to 2017 and Chief Executive of UK Research and Innovation (UKRI) from 2017 to 2020. In 2023 he became the Foreign Secretary of The Royal Society (jointly with Alison Noble).

== Education ==
Walport is the son of a general practitioner and was born in London. He was educated at St Paul's School, London, studied medicine at Clare College, Cambridge, and completed his clinical training at Hammersmith, Guy's and Brompton Hospitals in London. He was awarded a PhD degree for research into complement receptors under the supervision of Peter Lachmann in 1986 at the University of Cambridge.

== Career and research ==
Previously Walport was Director of the Wellcome Trust from 2003 to 2013. Before this, he was Professor of Medicine (from 1991) and Head of the Division of Medicine (from 1997) at Imperial College London, where he led a research team that focused on the immunology and genetics of rheumatic diseases.

Walport was the eleventh Government Chief Scientific Adviser from 2013 to 2017, succeeding Sir John Beddington.

It was announced in February 2017 that Mark Walport is now Chief Executive of UK Research and Innovation (UKRI).

=== Honours and awards ===
Walport was knighted in the 2009 New Year Honours list for services to medical research. He was elected an Honorary Fellow of the Royal Society of Edinburgh (FRSE) in 2017 and a Fellow of the Royal Society (FRS) in 2011. His nomination for the Royal Society reads:

Mark Walport has an overwhelming case for election both for his earlier scientific work on the immunology of systemic LE and the role of complement and of defective apoptosis in its pathogenesis; and, as a general candidate, for his achievements as head of medicine at the Hammersmith Campus of Imperial College and since 2003 as Director of the Wellcome Trust. In the latter role he has provided national and international leadership at the highest level on biomedical research and policy issues and is widely recognised as a world leader in the promotion of biomedical science.

== Personal life ==
Walport is married to Dr Julia Walport MBE (nee Neild), past-master of the Worshipful Society of Apothecaries. Lady Walport is a trustee of the Amber Trust and of Ealing Youth Orchestra. She was made MBE in the 2024 New Year Honours.

Government offices
Preceded by John Beddington	Government Chief Scientific Adviser; 2013−2017	Succeeded by Chris Whitty; Acting
Cultural offices
Preceded by Michael Dexter	Director of Wellcome Trust; 2003–2013	Succeeded by Jeremy Farrar
