= William Stewart (biologist) =

Sir William Stewart FRS FRSE
- Born: 6 June 1935 (age 91)
- Education: University of Glasgow
- Known for: Government Chief Scientific Adviser
- Spouse: Elizabeth Smales
- Awards: Fellow of the Royal Society; Knight Bachelor
- Scientific career
- Thesis: Studies in the biological fixation of nitrogen (1961)

Sir William Duncan Paterson Stewart FRS FRSE (born 6 June 1935) was President of the Royal Society of Edinburgh from 1999–2002 and Chairman of the Microbiological Research Authority.

== Education ==
Stewart was educated at Bowmore Junior Secondary School, Dunoon Grammar School and the University of Glasgow, where he gained Bachelor of Science, Doctor of Philosophy and Doctor of Science degrees.

== Career ==
Stewart began his career as an assistant lecturer at the University of Nottingham, from 1961–63. He was then a lecturer at Westfield College from 1963–68, before becoming the Boyd Baxter Professor of Biology at the University of Dundee, a role he held from 1968 to 1995. During this time, he was also Vice-Principal of the university between 1985 and 1987, and became a Fellow of the Royal Society of Edinburgh in 1973.

From 1990 to 1995 Stewart was Chief Scientific Adviser, Cabinet Office, and the first Head of the UK Office of Science and Technology (1992–1995).

Stewart is also Chairman of the National Radiological Protection Board (NRPB) and Chairman of the Health Protection Agency. He has held a number of other high-profile appointments including: Architect of the Government's Technology Foresight Programme, which was launched in 1995 and Chairman of the Independent Expert Group on Mobile Telephones and Health, which reported in 2000. He is a biologist by training. He was Chairman of Tayside University Hospitals NHS Trust but resigned following a critical report from the Tayside Task Force. He has served on numerous advisory committees, including the Royal Commission on Environmental Pollution and the Natural Environment Research Council. Stewart was Chief Executive of the Agricultural and Food Research Council, a former Vice-President of the Royal Society of London and is a Past President of the British Association for the Advancement of Science.

== Personal ==
Stewart is married to the former Elizabeth Smales, a senior medical officer at the Scottish Executive.

Government offices
Preceded by Sir John Fairclough	Government Chief Scientific Adviser; 1990–1995	Succeeded by Sir Robert May
