= Werner Fornos =

German-American activist and politician (1933–2013)

Member of Maryland State House of Delegates
- In office 1967–1970

Personal details
- Born: November 5, 1933 Leipzig, Germany
- Died: January 16, 2013 (aged 79) Basye, Virginia

Werner H. Fornos (November 5, 1933 – January 16, 2013) was a German-American activist and politician. An advocate for global population control, he served as president of the Population Institute.

== Life ==
Fornos was born Werner Horst Farenhold in Leipzig, Germany, and fled to the United States after World War II. He was adopted by the Fornos family and became an American citizen. Fornos served as a member of the Maryland State House of Delegates from 1967 to 1970 as a Democrat. He ran for the House of representatives in 1972 and 1976, losing.

Werner was awarded the Humanist of the Year in 1991 by the American Humanist Association and the United Nations Population Award in 2003. He died on January 16, 2013, in Basye, Virginia from complications of diabetes.
