= Alan Cottrell =

British metallurgist and physicist

Sir Alan Cottrell FRS
- Born: 17 July 1919; Birmingham, Warwickshire, U.K. (now West Midlands)
- Died: 15 February 2012 (aged 92); Cambridge, Cambridgeshire
- Education: University of Birmingham
- Known for: Cottrell atmosphere Lomer–Cottrell junction Crack tip opening displacement
- Awards: Fellow of the Royal Society; Hughes Medal (1961); Harvey Prize (1974); Rumford Medal (1974); Copley Medal (1996)
- Scientific career
- Fields: Metallurgist, Physicist

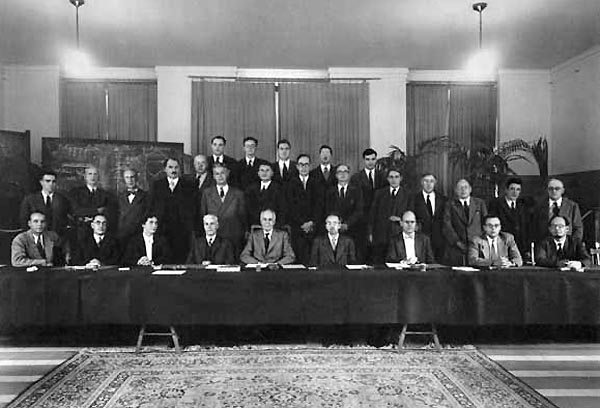
Solvay Conference on Physics in Brussels 1951. Left to right, sitting: Crussaro, N.P. Allen, Cauchois, Borelius, Bragg, Moller, Sietz, Hollomon, Frank; middle row: Rathenau, Koster, Rudberg, Flamache, Goche, Groven, Orowan, Burgers, Shockley, Guinier, C.S. Smith, Dehlinger, Laval, Henriot; top row: Gaspart, Lomer, Cottrell, Homes, Curien

Sir Alan Howard Cottrell, FRS (17 July 1919 – 15 February 2012) was an English metallurgist and physicist. He was also former Chief Scientific Advisor to the UK Government and vice-chancellor of Cambridge University 1977–1979.

== Early life ==
Cottrell was educated at Moseley Grammar School and the University of Birmingham, where he gained a Bachelor of Science degree in 1939 and a PhD for research on welding in 1942.

== Career ==
Cottrell joined the staff as a lecturer at Birmingham, being made professor in 1949, and transforming the teaching of the department by emphasising modern concepts of solid state physics. In 1955 he moved to A.E.R.E. Harwell, to become Deputy Head of Metallurgy under Monty Finniston.

From 1958 to 1965 Cottrell was Goldsmiths' Professor of Metallurgy at Cambridge University, and a fellow of Christ's College. He later worked for the government in various capacities, ultimately as Chief Scientific Adviser from 1971 to 1974, before becoming Master of Jesus College, Cambridge, from 1973 to 1986, and Vice-Chancellor of the university in 1977–1979.

== Death ==
Cottrell died on 15 February 2012 after a brief illness.

== Awards and honours ==
- 1955 Elected Fellow of the Royal Society
- 1961 Hughes Medal
- 1962 Francis J. Clamer Medal
- 1963 Royal Society Bakerian Medal
- 1965 He was the first to be awarded the A. A. Griffith Medal and Prize.
- 1967 James Alfred Ewing Medal.
- 1969 Fernand Holweck Medal and Prize
- 1971 He was knighted.
- 1973 Honorary Degree (Doctor of Science) from the University of Bath.
- 1974 James Douglas Gold Medal
- 1982 Honorary doctorate from the University of Essex
- 1991 Elected Member of Academia Europaea
- 1996 Copley Medal (the Royal Society's highest award)

He was a member of the Royal Swedish Academy of Sciences.

== Selected books ==
- Theoretical Structural Metallurgy (1948) (E Arnold; 2nd Revised edition (1 January 1955)) (ISBN 0713120436)
- Dislocations and Plastic Flows in Crystals (1953) (ISBN 978-0198512066)
- Superconductivity (1964) (Harwood Academic (Medical, Reference and Social Sc; n edition (December 1964)) (ISBN 0677000650)
- An Introduction to Metallurgy (1967) (ISBN 978-0901716934)
- Portrait of Nature : the world as seen by modern science (1975) (ISBN 978-0684143552)
- How Safe is Nuclear Energy? (1982) (Heinemann Educational Publishers (29 June 1981)) (ISBN 0435541757)
- Concepts in the Electron Theory of Alloys (1998) (ISBN 978-1861250759)

== See also ==
- Creep (deformation)

Government offices
Preceded by Sir Solly Zuckerman	Chief Scientific Adviser to the UK Government; 1971–1974	Succeeded by Robert Press
Academic offices
Preceded by Sir Denys Page	Master of Jesus College, Cambridge; 1973–1986	Succeeded by Colin Renfrew
Preceded by Dame Rosemary Murray	Vice-Chancellor of the University of Cambridge; 1977–1979	Succeeded by Sir Peter Swinnerton-Dyer
