= Robert Press =

British scientist (1915-1984)

Robert Press, CB, CBE, FRSA (22 February 1915 - 30 August 1984) was a British scientist and career civil servant, involved for almost thirty years in technical aspects of nuclear negotiations.

Educated at Queen's University, Belfast, he was a research physicist at Trinity College, Dublin, from 1938 to 1940 (completing a PhD there on spectroscopic analysis of biological material). After a brief spell teaching, he became a physicist in the government's employment during the Second World War. He was then adviser to the War Council and then, from 1948, the Ministry of Supply. He was an adviser at the British embassy in Washington, DC, from 1951 to 1955 and later worked for the Ministry of Defence. Appointed a chief scientific officer in the Cabinet Office in 1967, he was promoted to Deputy Secretary in 1971; after the resignation of Sir Alan Cottrell as Chief Scientific Adviser in 1974, he assumed responsibility for advising the government on scientific and technological questions, retiring in 1976. He chaired the Council of Science and Technology Institutes from 1978 to 1980.

Government offices
Preceded by Sir Alan Cottrell	Chief Scientific Adviser to the UK Government; 1974–1976	Succeeded by Sir John Ashworth
