= John Fairclough =

British computer designer (1930–2003)

Sir John Fairclough
- Born: 23 August 1930
- Died: 5 June 2003 (aged 72)
- Known for: Computer science
- Scientific career
- Fields: Computer science

Sir John Whitaker Fairclough (23 August 1930 – 5 June 2003) was a British computer designer, and later government policy advisor.

== Education ==
John Fairclough was educated at Thirsk Grammar School and then studied electrical engineering at Manchester University, before undertaking national service with the RAF.

== Career ==
In 1954, he joined the Ferranti computer department and in 1957 he moved to IBM, including working in Raleigh, North Carolina, USA. He returned to the UK to be the Managing Director of IBM Hursley near Winchester in 1974.

During 1986–90, Fairclough was Chief Scientific Adviser for the UK Conservative government led by Margaret Thatcher. He left the Cabinet Office and was knighted in 1990. That year, he joined the Board of NM Rothschild and Sons in 1990, becoming Chairman of its venture capital section. He was also involved with a number of start-up companies.

He was President of the British Computer Society (1997–98).

== Personal life ==
He married his first wife, Margaret Harvey, in 1954. After her death in 1996, he married his second wife, Karen, in 2000. He had two sons and a daughter from his first marriage.

Government offices
Preceded by Sir Robin Nicholson	Chief Scientific Adviser to the UK Government; 1986–1990	Succeeded by Sir William Stewart
