= International Women's Health Coalition =

- Abbreviation: IWHC
- Predecessor: National Women's Health Coalition
- Formation: June 1, 1984; 42 years ago
- Founder: Joan Dunlop and Adrienne Germain
- Type: Non-governmental organization
- Location: 333 Seventh Avenue, New York City, United States
- Website: https://iwhc.org

The International Women's Health Coalition (IWHC) is a non-governmental organization founded in 1984 based in New York City. It focuses on issues relating to women and girls' human rights, health and equality and represents part of the women's movement that recognizes that many challenges to gender equality lie in challenges in health issues and in raising families. The IWHC is one of the oldest currently active global feminist groups.

In June 2021, IWHC announced that it will merge with the Center for Health and Global Equality and the International Planned Parenthood Federation Western Hemisphere Region. The name of the resulting organization is Fòs Feminista.

== History ==
Joan Dunlop was the first president and served from 1984 to 1998. Dunlop took over the National Women's Health Coalition created by Merle Goldberg and changed its mission to become more international in scope. The original NWHC was small, with a staff of three, and funded abortion training and other health services projects in various countries. Adrienne Germain was also involved in co-founding IWHC with Dunlop. Germain became vice president of IWHC in 1985. Germain and Dunlop created a unique approach to women's health initiatives by investing in "local women-led organisations that provide services and influence national policies, and, simultaneously, advocating for global policy and funding.

IWHC attended the 1994 United Nations International Conference on Population and Development in Cairo where they asked for the inclusion for access to contraception, safe abortion, maternity care, better access to women's health services and comprehensive sex education. In preparation for the conference, Dunlop and 15 colleagues developed a set of guidelines called "Women's Declaration on Population Policies", which focused on women's rights in family planning. The "Women's Declaration" was eventually reviewed and finalized with the help of 100 different women's organizations around the world. The "Women's Declaration" was adopted by the conference in Cairo. One of the main goals of the "Women's Declaration" was to "shift the focus of population programs from goals and targets" to considering the whole of a woman's life. Dunlop with the IWHC argued that working towards gender equality in addition to sex education would help reduce birth rates. Demographic goals and targets, conversely, led to programs that included forced or unwanted sterilizations and "inappropriate methods of family planning" for women. Dunlop also called demographic and target methods to population control "basically racist" because she felt there was a subtext that "those black and brown people should not have more children."

At the U.N. Women's Conference in Beijing in 1995, IWHC lobbied to include the idea that women have a right to control their sexuality "free of coercion, discrimination and violence." Dunlop, said, "It moves beyond sexuality as a means of reproduction." This agreement at the women's conference marked the first time women's sexuality was acknowledged as a right for women to control. It gave women a legal tool in countries where husbands were still legally able to force their wives to have sex. IWHC also sponsored women's groups from poorer nations to be able to attend the Beijing conference.

IWHC held a symposium in 1997 where they discussed women's health and international policy. Often, it was found that women's health issues had been undermined by economic policies by the United States.

By the time Dunlop retired in 1998, the IWHC had a $4 million annual budget. The IWHC was also "playing a leading role in influencing government and UN agency policies to ensure women's human rights were at the core of population policies." Germain became the next president of IWHC after Dunlop in 1998.

Françoise Girard succeeded Germain as president of IWHC in 2012.

== Activity ==
IWHC remains staunch on the idea that giving women better access to health care and sex education is the right and ethical way to help stabilize the world's population growth. The IWHC also publishes books relating to research and reviews of various policies relating to women's health. IWHC supports "50 health projects in eight countries." IWHC works cooperatively with the United Nations (UN) Population Fund and the World Bank.
