= Thoraya Obaid =

Saudia Aarabian UN official (born 1945)

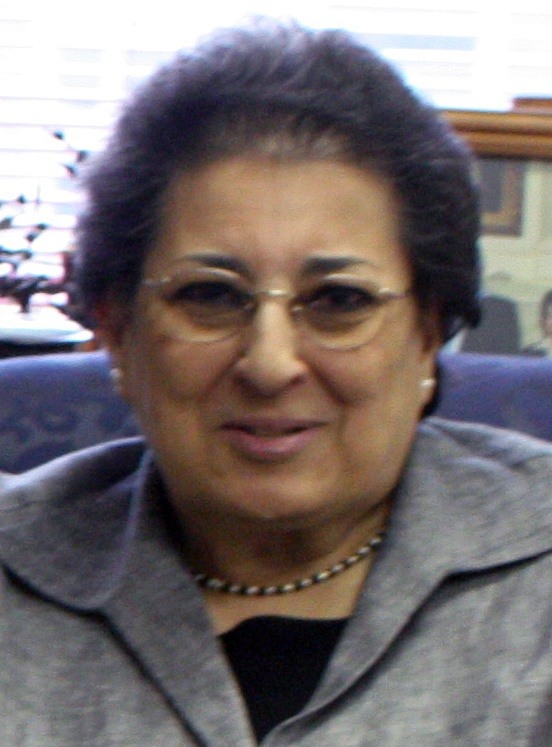
Obaid in 2009

Thoraya Ahmed Obaid (Arabic: ثريا عبيد, romanized: Thurayyā ʻUbayd; born 2 March 1945) is a Saudi politician and diplomat who served as executive director of the United Nations Population Fund from 2000 to 2010. From 2013 to 2016 she was a member of the Consultative Assembly of Saudi Arabia.

== Early life and education ==
Obaid was born on 2 March 1945 in Baghdad, Iraq. Her father Ahmed Obaid was a Saudi journalist and scholar of classical Arabic, and she has said that he was "something of a dissident for his era". She began her education at the age of three at an Islamic school in Mecca, then from the age of six in 1951 attended the American College for Girls in Cairo, Egypt. She was the first woman to receive a Saudi state scholarship for study in the United States and gained a BA in English literature from Mills College (1966) and an MA (1968) and PhD (1970) from Wayne State University, where her doctoral thesis was The Moor figure in English Renaissance drama.

== Career ==
Obaid joined the staff of the United Nations Economic and Social Commission for Western Asia (ESCWA) in 1975 and became its deputy executive secretary before moving in 1998 to the United Nations Population Fund (UNFPA) as director of its Division for Arab States and Europe. She became the executive director of UNFPA in 2001 and held the position until 2010, with the status of Under-Secretary-General of the United Nations.

From 2013 to 2016 she was a member of the Consultative Assembly of Saudi Arabia, also known as the Shura Council. She was one of a group of thirty women who were the first to be appointed to this body, hitherto all-male.

She has served as a director of the Women's Learning Partnership.

== Recognition ==
Obaid was awarded the United Nations Population Award for 2105 in the individual category, the citation referring to "her outstanding dedication and commitment to raising awareness of population issues, with a particular focus on the rights and empowerment of women, girls and young people, including successfully advocating for the expansion of the Millennium Development Goals to address maternal health and save the lives of women".

In 2004, the Arabic edition of Forbes included Obaid in its list of the 50 most powerful Arab women in the world, and she appeared in the same listing in 2011. She is one of the 100 Muslims (50 men and 50 women) described in Natana J. DeLong-Bas's 2006 work Notable Muslims: Muslim Builders of World Civilization and Culture, and is included in the 2023 edition of The 500 Most Influential Muslims.

== Personal life ==
Obaid is married and has two daughters. Her husband is from Egypt.
