= Dudley Hooper =

Portrait of Dudley Hooper

Dudley Wood Hooper MA FCA (1 August 1910 – 12 January 1968) was a British businessman in the UK National Coal Board (NCB) and an early President of the British Computer Society (BCS). He was an accountant and an early promoter of electronic data processing (EDP).

Dudley Hooper was educated at Charterhouse School and Clare College, Cambridge. In 1935, he qualified as a Chartered Accountant. He spent 1940–45 on war service, mostly in Africa and as a staff officer, during World War II.

Hooper had training and experience in mathematics, accountancy, and the use and development of office technology. He was at the National Coal Board for almost two decades, from 1948 initially as a technical specialist in the application of accounting machines. He served as Chief Organising Accountant of the NCB during 1954–64. He then joined the Institute of Chartered Accountants as Technical Officer. Hooper had his first ideas on data processing in 1948, about five years before suitable computer equipment was actually available for office applications. He was a pioneer in training business users of computers.

Dudley Hooper was involved in the formation of the British Computer Society in the late 1950s. In April 1956, he chaired a meeting of the London Computer Group (LCG) at the Caxton Hall in Westminster, London, formed in the same year. The British Computer Society was formed in 1957 from the merger of the LCG and an association of scientists. Hooper was the first Chairman of British Computer Society and was later the President during 1961–62. He was a member of the Editorial Board of The Computer Journal, the journal of the British Computer Society. He was also founder and first editor of The Computer Bulletin of the British Computer Society.

Hooper lectured at Northampton Polytechnic (later City University).

A Dudley Hooper Memorial Lecture was given in Hooper's memory. It was delivered on 28 January 1969 by Lord Robens of Woldingham, Chairman of the National Coal Board, at the William Beveridge Hall, University of London, under the auspices of the British Computer Society.

Professional and academic associations
Preceded by Frank Yates	President of the British Computer Society; 1961–1962	Succeeded by Sid Michaelson
