= Elizabeth Sparrow =

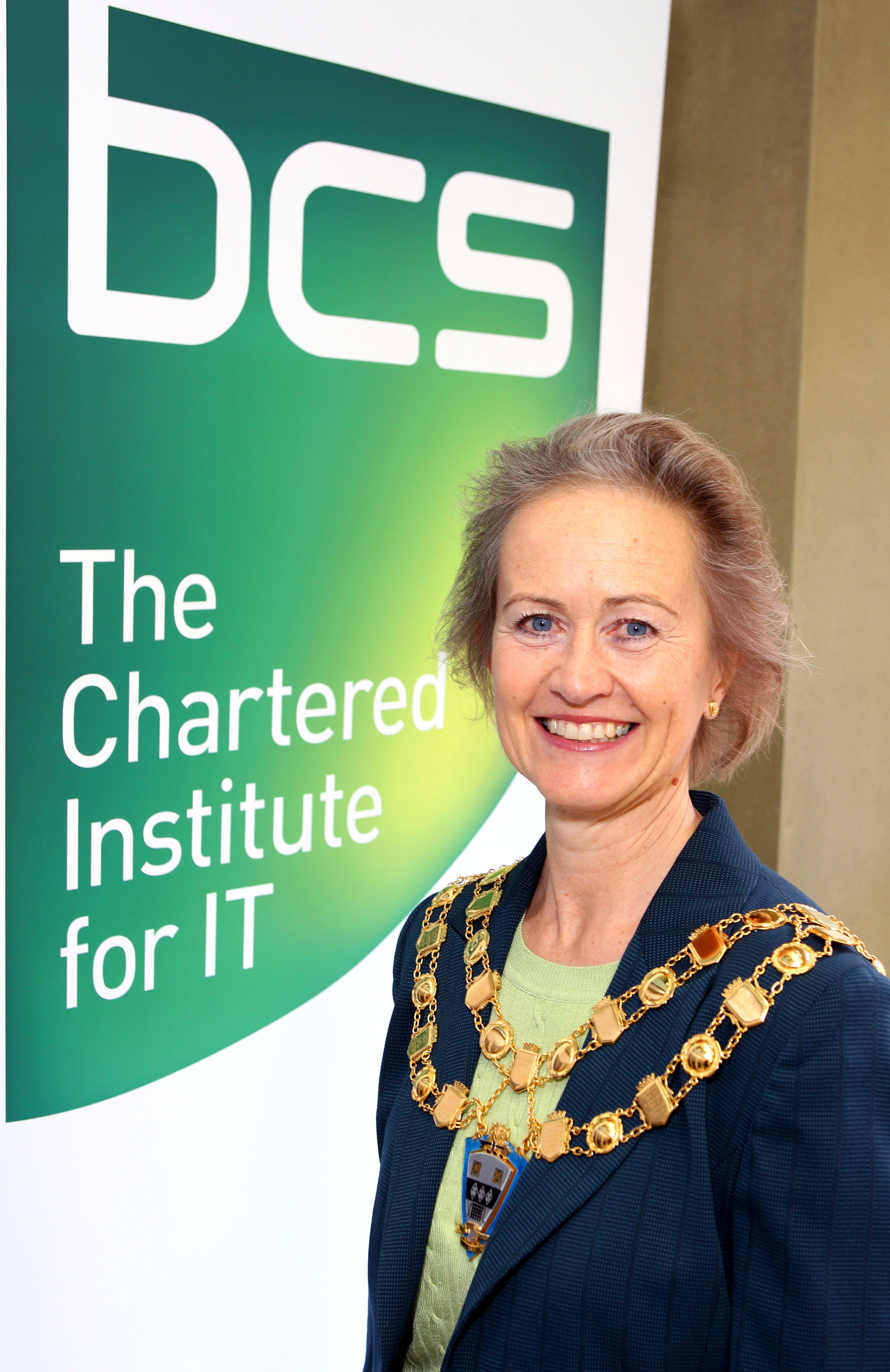
Elizabeth Sparrow

Elizabeth Sparrow is a British information technologist, specializing in change management and outsourcing relationships. She is a former president of BCS, The Chartered Institute for IT.

== Early life and education ==
Sparrow was born in west London and educated at Notting Hill and Ealing High School.

She studied for an undergraduate degree in mathematics at the University of Southampton, completing her Bachelor of Science degree in 1973. She completed a Master of Science degree in information studies at the University of Sheffield in 1975.

Sparrow holds a Certified Diploma in Accounting and Finance awarded by the Association of Chartered Certified Accountants.

== Career ==
Sparrow began her career at the British Library. In 1980 she specified and project managed the computerized conversion of many different library catalogues from the first edition of the Anglo-American Cataloguing Rules to the second. In 1986 Sparrow carried out a review of the Library Association Library.

Over the course of a 30-year career in information technology, Sparrow delivered major programmes of change and improved performance in both public and private sectors and developed particular expertise in working with outsourcing partners and improving supplier relationships. While at the Crown Prosecution Service, Elizabeth coordinated a substantial change programme involving not only the CPS but also the police service and courts. She held leadership positions in the UK public sector, managing multi-million-pound outsourcing relationships with a number of different service providers. As IT Director at the Home Office, she led a major infrastructure upgrade project and launched an innovative private finance initiative.

Sparrow is a Fellow of BCS, The Chartered Institute for IT and of the Royal Society of Arts.

== Professional and voluntary activities ==
At BCS, The Chartered Institute for IT, Sparrow chaired a group looking at offshoring which viewed the inexorable growth of IT offshoring both as a challenge and an opportunity for the UK’s IT profession. As well as analysing the offshoring phenomenon the group recommended an action plan to help the UK’s IT profession respond to globalization, Sparrow has regularly written and commented on the impact of offshoring.

Sparrow served an extended period of 17 months as President of BCS, The Chartered Institute for IT between 2009 and 2011. She focused on a series of public engagement programmes aimed at increasing public confidence in IT, helping everyone make better use of information in their lives and helping people become more active participants in the information society.

Sparrow chaired the School of Computing and Communications Industrial Advisory Board within the Open University.

She is a Liveryman at the Worshipful Company of Information Technologists and in 2021/22 was a Court Assistant and trustee of the WCIT Charity.

Sparrow has been a board member and trustee at AbilityNet, Barts Guild and Age UK London. She has spoken about water, sanitation and hygiene and the work of the charity WaterAid at many schools in London.

Sparrow has created a series of school lessons on science and technology topics.

== Awards and honours ==
Winner of the 1989 Gardner Merchant Award for her essay on Women and the Career Break.

Awarded an honorary doctorate by The Open University in 2008 for her public service and work in areas of special educational interest.

Awarded an honorary doctor of science degree by Kingston University in 2012 in recognition of her outstanding contribution to the profession.

== Publications ==
- Sparrow, Elizabeth (1986). The professional’s library: a management review of the Library Association Library’s collections and services. London: British Library. ISBN 0-7123-0121-6
- Sparrow, Elizabeth (2003). Successful IT outsourcing: from choosing a provider to managing the project. London: Springer. ISBN 1-85233-610-2
- Sparrow, Elizabeth (2005). A guide to global sourcing: offshore outsourcing and other global delivery models. Swindon: The British Computer Society. ISBN 1-902505-61-1
