= Robin Nicholson (metallurgist) =

British metallurgist (1934–2024)

Sir Robin Nicholson FRS FREng

Chief Scientific Adviser to the Government
- In office 1981–1985

Personal details
- Born: Robin Buchanan Nicholson; 12 August 1934 Sutton Coldfield, Warwickshire, England
- Died: 15 November 2024 (aged 90)

Sir Robin Buchanan Nicholson (12 August 1934 – 15 November 2024) was a British industrial metallurgist and academic, who served as Chief Scientific Adviser, Cabinet Office, from 1983 to 1985. He then joined the board of Rolls-Royce plc, where he served until 2005. He was also a non-executive board member of BP plc and Pilkington plc.

== Early life and education ==
Nicholson was born in Sutton Coldfield, Warwickshire, to Carroll Nicholson and Nancy Esther Levi. After attending Oundle School, Nicholson studied natural sciences at St Catharine's College, Cambridge, gaining a BA in 1956, followed by a PhD in metallurgy in 1959.

Nicholson was a fellow of Christ's College, Cambridge, from 1962 to 1966, and was made a lecturer in metallurgy at Cambridge in 1964, before becoming professor of metallurgy at the University of Manchester in 1966. He joined the European subsidiary of the nickel company Inco in 1972, initially to be the director of its research laboratory, becoming a director in 1975, and managing director from 1976 to 1981. In 1980, he was elected as a Fellow of the Royal Academy of Engineering.

In 1981, Nicholson joined the Central Policy Review Staff in the Cabinet Office, before becoming Chief Scientific Adviser, Cabinet Office from 1983 to 1985. He was also a member of the Science and Engineering Research Council (SERC) from 1978 to 1981, and a member of the UK Government's Council for Science and Technology (CST) from its inception in March 1993 to March 2000. He was elected a Fellow of the Royal Society in March 1978. Nicholson then re-joined the private sector, becoming a director of Pilkington plc and Rolls-Royce plc in 1986; and BP plc in 1987, where as chairman of the remuneration committee until 2005 he was several times the target of public criticism for approving steep increases in executive pay.

Nicholson was elected a member of the US National Academy of Engineering in 1983, with a citation for his leadership in government/industry engineering policy, in bio-engineering, in theory of precipitation hardening in metals (his research field in the early 1960s), and in solar energy materials systems. He was the first chairman of the National Energy Foundation, from its inception in 1988 until replaced by Mary Archer in 1990; he remained on its board of trustees until 1996.

In 1998, Nicholson published Science and Technology in the United Kingdom in the series of Cartermill Guides to World Science & Technology.

Nicholson was a Member of Council of Exeter University until 2011.

== Personal life and death ==
In 1958, Nicholson married Elizabeth Mary Caffyn, daughter of Sir Sydney Caffyn. They had two daughters, Jennifer and Helen, along with a son, Timothy. Elizabeth Mary died in 1988.

Nicholson died on 15 November 2024, at the age of 90.

Government offices
Preceded by Dr John Ashworth	Chief Scientific Adviser to the UK Government; 1983–1985	Succeeded by Sir John Fairclough
