= Sustainable management =

Synthesis of concepts of sustainability and management

Sustainable management takes the concepts from sustainability and synthesizes them with the concepts of management. Sustainability has three branches: the environment, the needs of present and future generations, and the economy. Using these branches, it creates the ability of a system to thrive by maintaining economic viability and also nourishing the needs of the present and future generations by limiting resource depletion.

Sustainable management is needed because it is an important part of the ability to successfully maintain the quality of life on our planet. Sustainable management can be applied to all aspects of our lives. For example, the practices of a business should be sustainable if they wish to stay in businesses, because if the business is unsustainable, then by the definition of sustainability they will cease to be able to be in competition. Communities are in a need of sustainable management, because if the community is to prosper, then the management must be sustainable. Forest and natural resources need to have sustainable management if they are to be able to be continually used by our generation and future generations. Our personal lives also need to be managed sustainably. This can be by making decisions that will help sustain our immediate surroundings and environment, or it can be by managing our emotional and physical well-being. Sustainable management can be applied to many things, as it can be applied as a literal and an abstract concept. Meaning, depending on what they are applied to the meaning of what it is can change.

== History ==
Managers' strategies reflect the mindset of the times. This being the case, it has been a problem for the evolution of sustainable management practices for two reasons. The first reason is that sustainable norms are continually changing. For example, things considered unthinkable a few years ago are now standard practices. And the second reason is that in order to practice sustainable management, one has to be forward thinking, not only in the short term, but also in the long term. Management behavior is a reflection of how accepted conceptions of behavior are defined. This means that forces and beliefs outside of the given program push along the management. The manager can take some credit for the cultural changes in his or her program, but overall the organization’s culture reflects dominant conceptions of the public at that time. This is exemplified through the managerial actions taken during the time periods that lead up to the present day. These examples are given below:

- Industrial environmentalism (1960–1970)

This was a time period in which, even though there were outside concerns about the environment, the industries were able to resist pressures and make their own definitions and regulations. Environmentalists were not viewed as credible sources of information during this time and usually discredited.

- Regulatory environmentalism (1970–1982)

The norms of this period radically shifted with the creating of the U.S. Environmental Protection Agency (EPA) in 1970. The EPA became the mediator between the environmentalists and the industry, although the two sides never met. During this period, the environment for the majority of industry and business management teams was only important in terms of compliance with law. In 1974 a conference board survey found that the majority of companies still treated environmental management as a threat. The survey noted a widespread tendency in most of industry to treat pollution control expenditures as non-recoverable investments. According to the consensus environmental protection was considered at best a necessary evil, and at worst a temporary nuisance.

- Environmentalism as social responsibility (1982–1988)

By 1982, the EPA had lost its credibility, but at the same time activism became more influential, and there was an increase in the funding and memberships of major non-governmental organizations (NGOs). Industry gradually became more cooperative with government and new managerial structures were implemented to achieve compliances with regulations.

- Strategic environmentalism (1988–1993)

During this period, industry progressed into a proactive stance on environmental protection. With this attitude, the issue became one in which they felt qualified to manage on their own. Although there was advancement in organizational power, the concern for the environment still kept being pushed down the hierarchy of important things to do.

- Environmental management as an opportunity (Since 1993)

In 1995 Harvard professor Michael Porter wrote in the Harvard Business Review that environmental protection was not a threat to the corporate enterprise but rather an opportunity, one that could increase competitive advantage in the marketplace. Before 2000, The companies generally regarded green buildings as interesting experiments but unfeasible projects in the real business world. Since then several factors, including the ones listed below, have caused major shifts in thinking. The creation of reliable building rating and performance measurement systems for new construction and renovation has helped change corporate perceptions about green. In 2000, the Washington D.C.–based United States Green Building Council launched its rigorous Leadership in Energy and Environmental Design (LEED) program. Hundreds of US and international studies have proven the financial advantages of going green: lower utility costs, higher employee productivity. Green building materials, mechanical systems, and furnishings have become more widely available, and prices have dropped considerably. As changes are made to the norms of what is acceptable from a management perspective, more and more it becomes apparent that sustainable management is the new norm of the future. Currently, there are many programs, organizations, communities, and businesses that follow sustainable management plans. These new entities are pressing forward with the help of changing social norms and management initiatives.

== Management position ==
A manager is a person that is held responsible for the planning of things that will benefit the situation that they are controlling. To be a manager of sustainability, one needs to be a manager that can control issues and plan solutions that will be sustainable, so that what they put into place will be able to continue for future generations. The job of a sustainable manager is like other management positions, but additionally they have to manage systems so that they are able to support and sustain themselves. Whether it is a person that is a manager of groups, business, family, communities, organizations, agriculture, or the environment, they can all use sustainable management to improve their productivity, environment, and atmosphere, among other things. Some practical skills that are needed to be able to perform the job include:

- Seeing problems/issues
- Being able to set goals/agendas
- Planning Skills
- Creating new ways of doing things (thinking outside the box)
- Taking action when it is needed
- Organizational skills
- Being able to teach, make aware, and train people
- Ability to make tough decisions
- Keeping track of progress
- Taking responsibility
- Ability to project current issues/ideas/plans into the Future
- Possessing whole systems thinking

Recently, there has even been the addition of new programs in colleges and universities in order to be able to offer Bachelor of Science and Master of Science degrees in Sustainable management.

== Business ==
In business, time and time again, environmentalists are seen facing off against industry, and there is usually very little "meeting in the middle" or compromises. When these two sides agree to disagree, the result is a more powerful message, and it becomes one that allows more people to understand and embrace.

Organizations need to face the fact that the boundaries of accountability are moving fast. The trend towards sustainable management means that organizations are beginning to implement a systems wide approach that links in the various parts of the business with the greater environment at large.

As sustainable management institutions adapt, it becomes imperative that they include an image of sustainable responsibility that is projected for the public to see. This is because firms are socially based organizations. But this can be a double edged sword, because sometimes they end up focusing too much on their image rather than actually focusing on implementing what they are trying to project to the public; this is called green washing. It is important that the execution of sustainable management practices is not put aside while the firm tries to appeal to the public with their sustainable management “practices.”

Additionally, companies must make the connection between sustainability as a vision and sustainability as a practice. Managers need to think systematically and realistically about the application of traditional business principles to environmental problems. By melding the two concepts together, new ideas of business principles emerge and can enable some companies-those with the right industry structure, competitive position, and managerial skills- to deliver increased value to shareholders while making improvements in their environmental performance.

Any corporation can become green on a standard budget. By focusing on the big picture, a company can generate more savings and better performance. By using planning, design, and construction based on sustainable values, sustainable management strives to gain LEED points by reducing footprint of the facility by sustainably planning the site with focus on these three core ideas. To complete a successful green building, or business, the management also applies cost benefit analysis in order to allocate funds appropriately.

=== Business economics ===
The economic system, like all systems, is subject to the laws of thermodynamics, which define the limit at which the Earth can successfully process energy and wastes. Managers need to understand that their values are critical factors in their decisions. Many of current business values are based on unrealistic economic assumptions; adopting new economic models that take the Earth into account in the decision-making process is at the core of sustainable management. This new management addresses the interrelatedness of the ecosystem and the economic system.

The strategic vision that is based on core values of the firm guides the firm’s decision-making processes at all levels. Thus, the sustainable management requires finding out what business activities fit into the Earth’s carrying capacity, and also defining the optimal levels of those activities. Sustainability values form the basis of the strategic management, process the costs and benefits of the firm’s operations, and are measured against the survival needs of the planets stakeholders. Sustainability is the core value because it supports a strategic vision of firms in the long term by integrating economic profits with the responsibility to protect the whole environment.

=== Service model ===
Changing industrial processes so that they actually replenish and magnify the stock of natural capital is another component of sustainable management. One way managers have figured out how to do this is by using a service model of business. This focuses on building relationships with customers, instead of focusing on making and selling products. This type of model represents a fundamental change in the way businesses behave. It allows for managers to be aware of the lifecycle of their products by leaving the responsibility up to the company to take care of the product throughout the life cycle. The service model, because the product is the responsibility of the business, creates an avenue in which the managers can see ways in which they can reduce the use of resources through recycling and product construction.

== Communities ==
For communities to be able to improve, sustainable management needs to be in practice. If a community relies on the resources that are in the surrounding area, then they need to be used in a sustainable manner to insure the indefinite supply of the resources. A community needs to work together to be able to be productive, and when there is a need to get things done, management needs to take the lead. If sustainable management is in practice in a community, then people will want to stay in that community, and other people will realize the success, and they will also want to live in a similar environment, as their own unsustainable towns fail. Part of a sustainable management system in a community is the education, the cooperation, and the responsiveness of the people that live in the community.

There are new ideals to how a community can be sustainable. This can include urban planning, which allow people to move about a city that are more sustainable for the environment. If management plans a community that allows for people to move without cars, it helps make a community sustainable by increasing mass transit or other modes of transportation. People would spend less time in traffic while improving the environment, and on an occasions exercise.

Sustainable management provides plans that can improve multiple parts of people lives, environment, and future generations. If a community sets goals, then people are more likely to reduce energy, water, and waste, but a community cannot set goals unless they have the management in place to set goals.

A part of sustainable management for a community is communicating the ideals and plans for an area to the people that will be carrying out the plan. Sustainable management is not sustainable if the person that is managing a situation is not communicating what needs to be improved, how it should be improved, why it is important to them, and how they are involved it in the process.

== Personal life ==
For a person to be responsible for their action is a part of managing, and that is part of being managed sustainable. To be able to manage oneself sustainable there are many factors to consider, because to be able to manage oneself a person needs to be able to see what they are doing unsustainable, and how to become sustainable. By using plastic bags at a check out line is unsustainable because it creates pollutants, but using reusable biodegradable bags can resolve the problem. This is not only environmentally sustainable, but it also improves the physical and mental sustainability of the person that uses the reusable bags. It is physical improvement because people do not have to live with the countless plastic bags on the Earth and the pollution that comes with it. It is also an improvement to mental sustainability, because the person that uses the reusable bags has feeling of accomplishment that comes from doing the right thing. Deciding to buy local food to make the community stronger through community sustainable management, can also be emotionally, environmentally, and physically rewarding.

In Figure 1 Mckenzie shows how a person can look at a behavior that they are doing and determine if it is sustainable or not, and what they could replace the bad behavior with. Education of an individual would be the first step to deciding to take a step towards managing their lives sustainable. To manage a person life the benefits needs to be high and the barriers low. Good managing would come up with a competing behavior that has no barriers to it. To come up with a Competing behavior that does not have a barrier to it would involve good problem solving.

	New Behavior	Competing Behavior 1	Competing Behavior 2
Perceived Benefits			
Perceived Barriers			

Figure 2 Mckenzie is an example of what a person might try to change in their life to make it more sustainable. Walking instead of taking the taxi helps the environment, but it also loses time spent with family. The bus is in the middle of walking and taking a taxi, but another option that is not on the list is riding a bike. Good sustainable management would include all the options that are possible, and new options that were not available before. These figures are tools that can be used in helping people manage their lives sustainably, but there are other ways to think about their lives to become more sustainable.

	New Behavior Walk to Work	Competing Behavior 1 Take a Taxi	Competing Behavior 2 Take the Bus in Winter
Perceived Benefits	Helps the Environment	Time with Family	Cheaper than Taxi
Perceived Barriers	Lose time with family	No alternative/Costly/Bad for the environment	Loses more time with family

== Forests ==
There are very practical needs for sustainable management of forest. Since forests provide many as per as resources to the people, and to the world, management of the forests are critical to keep those resources available. To be able to manage a forest, knowledge of how the natural systems work is needed. If a manager knows how the natural system works, then when manager of the forest makes plans how the resources are to remove from the forest, the manager will know how the resources can be removed without damaging the forest. Since many forests are under management of the government that is in the region, the forest are not truly functioning how the ecosystem was naturally developed, and how it is meant to be. An example is the pine flatwoods in Florida. To be able to maintain that ecosystem frequent burnings of the forest needs to happen. Fires are a natural part of the ecosystem, but since wild fires can spread to communities near the forest, control of the wild fires is requested from the communities. To maintain flatwoods forest control burning or prescribe burning is part of the management to sustain the forest.

== See also ==
- Holistic management
- Nature-based solutions
