= Julia C. Henderson =

American suffragist

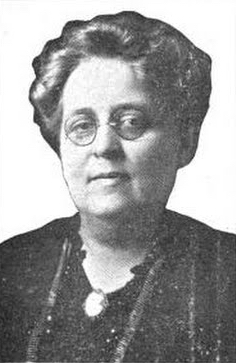
- Julia C. Henderson, from a 1919 publication
- Born: April 22, 1862; Crawfordsville, Indiana
- Died: March 15, 1922 (aged 59); Indianapolis, Indiana
- Occupation: Suffragist

Julia Coons Henderson (April 22, 1862 – March 15, 1922) was an American suffragist, secretary of the Woman's Franchise League of Indiana from 1912 to 1917. She was also assistant national secretary of the War Mothers of America.

== Early life ==
Julia Coons was from Crawfordsville, Indiana, the daughter of John R. Coons and Nancy Carolina Graham Coons.

== Career ==
Julia Coons was a teacher as a young woman. As Julia C. Henderson, she was treasurer of the Women's School League of Indianapolis in 1909, and secretary when the organization became the Woman's Franchise League of Indiana from 1912 to 1917. She was a leader of women's relief organizations in Indiana during World War I, and organized a speaker bureau for delivering wartime information and fundraising messages to women's groups. She was assistant secretary of the War Mothers of America after World War I, and started the organization's publication, The Service Star. After the war and the suffrage campaign, she continued active in Indiana politics and in the Indianapolis chapter of the League of Women Voters.

== Personal life ==
Julia Coons married George M. Henderson in 1884. They had a son, Edwin, born in 1890. She died suddenly in 1922, aged 59 years, in Indianapolis.
