= Sally Baldwin =

British social scientist (1940–2003)

Sally Baldwin (4 November 1940 – 28 October 2003) was a University of York social sciences professor and author.

== Early life and education ==
Baldwin was born Sarah Marie Kilday in Coatbridge, Scotland. At the University of Glasgow she studied English Language and Literature, in which she gained a first class degree. She later moved to the University of York, where she gained a diploma in social administration in 1973. She became part of the university's Social Policy Research Unit (SPRU), being appointed its director in 1987.

== Career ==
In 1990 she was made a professor and in 1994 became head of the University of York's Social Policy and Social Work Department. She continued to conduct research up until her death. After retiring as director of SPRU in 2002, she went on to carry out research in areas relating 'evidence based' methods to social policy.

== Death ==
Baldwin died 28 October 2003 at Tiburtina Station, Rome, Italy. The moving walkway she was travelling along at the station collapsed and she was crushed in the internal gearbox. It is believed that maintenance work on the walkway had resulted in several panels not being replaced properly, resulting in the accident.

Since the accident, the former Institute for Research in the Social Sciences buildings at the University of York have been renamed The Sally Baldwin Buildings and the Sally Baldwin PhD Studentship has been set up in the Social Policy and Social Work Department, in her memory.

== Publications ==
- Are There Dinosaurs in Space?
- The Costs of Caring: Families with Disabled Children
