= Hossein Malek-Afzali =

Iranian scientist

Hossein Malek-Afzali (Persian: حسین ملک‌افضلی; born 1939) is an Iranian scientist, physician, and an associate of World Health Organization.

He is currently professor at the Department of Biostatistics and Epidemiology, School of Public Health, Tehran University. He also acted as deputy health minister of Iran.

Malek-Afzali is the author of more than 80 articles in international journals and several books in English and Persian.

In 2007, Malek-Afzali was awarded the United Nations Population Award. He has helped design strategies to improve health procedures, particularly adolescent health, reproductive health and family planning. In the field of reproductive health, he has engaged policymakers and religious leaders in the planning and implementation of reproductive health programmes in Iran.

== Awards ==
- United Nations Population Award (2007)

== See also ==
- Intellectual movements in Iran
- Contemporary Medicine in Iran
