= Frank Yates =

English pioneer of 20th-century statistics

Frank Yates FRS
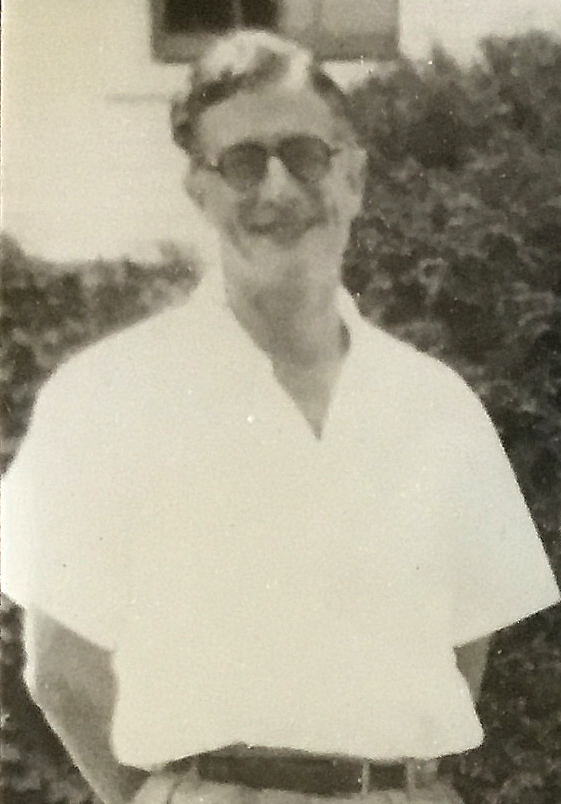
- Frank Yates at the statistics conference at the Blue Ridge Assembly in Asheville, NC during the summer of 1952.
- Born: 12 May 1902
- Died: 17 June 1994 (aged 92)
- Education: St John's College, Cambridge
- Years active: 1933-1968

Frank Yates FRS (12 May 1902 – 17 June 1994) was an English statistician who was one of the pioneers of 20th-century statistics.

== Biography ==
Yates was born in Manchester, England, the eldest of five children (and only son) of seed merchant and botanist Percy Yates and his wife Edith. He attended Wadham House, a private school, before gaining a scholarship to Clifton College in 1916. In 1920, he obtained a scholarship at St John's College, Cambridge, and four years later graduated with a First Class Honours degree.

He spent two years teaching mathematics to secondary school pupils at Malvern College before heading to Africa, where he was mathematical advisor on the Gold Coast Survey. He returned to England, due to ill health, and met and married a chemist, Margaret Forsythe Marsden, the daughter of a civil servant. This marriage was dissolved in 1933, and he later married Prascovie (Pauline) Tchitchkine, previously the partner of Alexis Tchitchkine. After her death in 1976, he married Ruth Hunt, his long-time secretary.

In 1931, Yates was appointed assistant statistician at Rothamsted Experimental Station by R.A. Fisher. In 1933, he became head of statistics when Fisher went to University College London. At Rothamsted he worked on the design of experiments, including contributions to the theory of analysis of variance, as well as developing Yates's algorithm and the balanced incomplete block design.

During World War II he worked on what would later be called operations research.

After WWII, he worked on sample survey design and analysis. He became an enthusiast of electronic computers, in 1954 obtaining an Elliott 401 for Rothamsted and contributing to the initial development of statistical computing. During 1960–61, he was President of the British Computer Society, succeeding the founding president and computer pioneer, Maurice Wilkes. In 1960, he was awarded the Guy Medal in Gold of the Royal Statistical Society and, in 1966, he was awarded the Royal Medal of the Royal Society. He retired from Rothamsted to become a senior research fellow at Imperial College London. He died in 1994, aged 92, in Harpenden.

== Selected publications ==
- The design and analysis of factorial experiments, Technical Communication no. 35 of the Commonwealth Bureau of Soils (1937) (alternatively attributed to the Imperial Bureau of Soil Science).
- Statistical tables for biological, agricultural and medical research (1938, coauthor R.A. Fisher): sixth edition, 1963
- Sampling methods for censuses and surveys (1949)
- Computer programs GENFAC, RGSP, Fitquan.

== See also ==
- Fisher–Yates shuffle
- Yates analysis
- Yates's correction for continuity

Professional and academic associations
Preceded by Maurice Wilkes	President of the British Computer Society; 1960–1961	Succeeded by Dudley Hooper
