= Government Chief Scientific Adviser (United Kingdom) =

Adviser to the UK Prime Minister and the Cabinet

The government chief scientific adviser (GCSA) is the personal adviser on science and technology-related activities and policies to the prime minister of the United Kingdom and the Cabinet. They are also the head of the Government Office for Science. Since 2023 Dame Angela McLean has been GCSA.

Many individual government departments have departmental chief scientific advisers (CSA). The GCSA is involved in recruiting CSAs, and meets regularly with CSAs to identify priorities, challenges and strategies. The adviser also usually serves as chair of the UK's Scientific Advisory Group for Emergencies (SAGE).

== List of Government Chief Scientific Advisers ==
#	Portrait	Name	Term of office		Concurrent office(s)
1		Sir Solly Zuckerman	1964	1971	
2		Sir Alan Cottrell	1971	1974	
3		Robert Press	1974	1976	
4		Sir John Ashworth	1977	1981	
5		Sir Robin Nicholson	1982	1985	
6		Sir John Fairclough	1986	1990	
7		Sir William Stewart	1990	1995	
8		Sir Robert May	1995	2000	
9		Sir David King	2000	2008	
10		Sir John Beddington	2008	2013	
11		Sir Mark Walport	2013	2017	
		Chris Whitty (interim)	2017	2018	Chief Medical Officer for England
12		Sir Patrick Vallance	4 April 2018	2023	National Technology Adviser (2020–2023)
13		Dame Angela McLean	2023	Incumbent	

== See also ==
- Chief Medical Officer in the United Kingdom
- Chief Scientific Officer for England
- MoD Chief Scientific Adviser
- Government Office for Science
- National Technology Adviser
- Frederick Lindemann, 1st Viscount Cherwell
- Chief Science Advisor in Canada
