= Scientific Advisory Group for Emergencies =

UK governmental advisory body

The Scientific Advisory Group for Emergencies (SAGE) is a UK Government body that advises central government in emergencies. It is usually chaired by the United Kingdom's Chief Scientific Adviser. Specialists from academia and industry, along with experts from within government, make up the participation, which will vary depending on the emergency. SAGE gained public prominence for its role in the 2020 COVID-19 pandemic in the United Kingdom.

== History ==
In the aftermath of the United Kingdom BSE outbreak, "the then Government Chief Scientific Adviser (Lord May) published Guidelines on the Use of Scientific Advice in Policy-Making; these have subsequently been revised, most recently in June 2010... The Government [later] developed the Principles of Scientific Advice to Government, which 'set out the rules of engagement between Government and those who provide independent scientific and engineering advice.' The Principles apply to 'Ministers and Government departments, all members of Scientific Advisory Committees and Councils [...] and other independent scientific and engineering advice to Government.' They detail principles related to roles and responsibilities, independence and transparency and openness." The May advice was updated in May 2011 in a document entitled Code of Practice for Scientific Advisory Committees (CoPSAC 2011).

"In an emergency where scientific or technical advice is required to aid the emergency response, the Government may decide that a" SAGE "is required; this decision can either be made by the Lead Government Department (LGD) or the Cabinet Office in consultation with the Government Office for Science. SAGE is usually chaired by the Government Chief Scientific Adviser... Each SAGE is emergency-specific. The swine flu pandemic was the first emergency where the SAGE mechanism was used; volcanic ash was the second."

SAGE has advised the government on a number of events, including:

- the 2009 flu pandemic
- the 2010 eruptions of Eyjafjallajökull
- the 2011 Fukushima nuclear accident
- the 2013–14 United Kingdom winter floods (3 meetings)
- the 2014 Ebola outbreak (3 meetings)
- the 2015 Nepal earthquake (1 meeting)
- the 2015–16 Zika virus epidemic (5 meetings)
- the 2018-9 Ebola outbreak (3 meetings)
- the potential catastrophic breach of Toddbrook Reservoir in 2019 (1 meeting)
- the COVID-19 pandemic (at least 105 meetings)

== Structure and function ==
SAGE was reported in July 2020 to consist of around 20 participants at any one given time. Participants are drawn from both academia and practice, and the participants of a particular meeting are decided upon by the British Government Chief Scientific Adviser and the Chief Medical Officer for England, depending on the expertise required. They are not generally employed by government. They do not operate under government instruction. In addition to these participants, SAGE is also attended by officials from relevant parts of government and arm's-length bodies who may contribute to discussions with relevant expertise, for instance, the UK Health Security Agency and the Chief Scientific Advisers to government departments.

The government does not have to act upon the conclusions of SAGE, and other bodies, including other sources of scientific advice, feed in to government's decisions. Only the Chief Scientific Adviser and Chief Medical Officer may speak on behalf of SAGE.

In 2020, the UK Government carried out a review of SAGE's structure in the context of the COVID-19 pandemic.

Sub-committees can be delegated by SAGE to study particular issues. During the COVID-19 pandemic, these were:

- Scientific Pandemic Insights Group on Behaviours (SPI-B)
- Scientific Pandemic Influenza Group on Modelling (SPI-M) and its the Operational sub-group (SPI-M-O); the sub-group was awarded the Weldon Memorial Prize in 2022 for its work in the COVID-19 pandemic
- PHE Serology Working Group
- COVID-19 Clinical Information Network (CO-CIN)
- Environmental Modelling Group (EMG)
- Children’s Task and Finish Working Group (TFC)
- Hospital Onset COVID-19 Working Group (HOCI)
- Ethnicity Subgroup
- Social Care Working Group (SCWG)

== COVID-19 ==
The 2020 COVID-19 pandemic has seen an expanded role for and greater attention paid to SAGE.

Although not prohibited, until the 2020 COVID-19 pandemic, it is believed that political advisors had never attended SAGE meetings in any capacity nor is there evidence for 10 Downing Street officials attending these meetings too. It was reported that Dominic Cummings and Ben Warner had attended COVID-19 meetings. Their attendance and participation was widely criticised, in particular by other attendees "shocked, concerned and worried for the impartiality of advice".

Early in the pandemic, in April 2020, SAGE was criticised for a lack of transparency. For their security and safety, and on advice from the Centre for the Protection of National Infrastructure, the list of current members was not disclosed, although members could, and many did, reveal their own membership. Chris Whitty, speaking to the Health and Social Care Select Committee regarding the COVID-19 meetings of SAGE and the anonymity of its members, said that SAGE was "given quite clear advice from the Centre for the Protection of National Infrastructure, basically based on the fact that SAGE is a sub-committee of COBRA". Patrick Vallance argued in a letter to Parliament that scientists were protected by the anonymity from "lobbying and other forms of unwanted influence".

Membership of SAGE and its subcommittees was published on 4 May 2020. A register of participants' interests was first published in December 2020.

== Participants ==
=== April 2020 ===
A report in The Guardian stated that attendees at an April 2020 meeting of the group included:

Senior advisers:

- Sir Patrick Vallance, Chief Scientific Adviser (chair)
- Professor Chris Whitty, Chief Medical Adviser

Medical and scientific experts:

- Professor John Aston, statistician, Chief Scientific Adviser to the Home Office
- Dr Meera Chand, microbiologist
- Sir Ian Diamond, National Statistician
- Professor John Edmunds, epidemiologist
- Sir Jeremy Farrar, medical researcher
- Professor Neil Ferguson, epidemiologist
- Professor Peter Horby, epidemiologist
- Professor Angela McLean, mathematical biologist
- Professor Graham Medley, epidemiologist
- Dr Edward Mullins, clinical adviser
- Professor Sharon Peacock, microbiologist
- Professor Stephen Powis, national medical director for England
- Professor Andrew Rambaut, molecular biologist
- Emma Reed, emergency planner
- Professor Brooke Rogers, social psychologist
- Dr James Rubin, psychologist
- Professor Jonathan Van-Tam, influenza specialist, Deputy Chief Medical Officer for England
- Professor Charlotte Watts, epidemiologist, Chief Scientific Advisor to the Department for International Development
- Professor Maria Zambon, virologist

Political advisers:

- Dominic Cummings
- Dr Ben Warner, data scientist

Vallance has written that SAGE includes scientists and experts from more than twenty separate institutions. SAGE also contains four expert groups which may each have as low as five and as many as over forty members.

Dominic Cummings was confirmed by 10 Downing Street to have attended a 23 March meeting, but the government said Cummings was not a member of SAGE. The attendance and participation by Prime Ministerial advisors caused much criticism. It was reported that one participant considered that Cummings' interventions had sometimes inappropriately influenced what is supposed to be an impartial scientific process; another expressed shock when Cummings first began participating in SAGE discussions, in February, viewing this as unwanted political influence on what should be "unadulterated scientific data".

=== May 2020 ===
In May 2020, Professor Neil Ferguson resigned from SAGE after The Telegraph revealed he had violated lockdown rules to meet with a partner. The same day of his resignation, a list of SAGE participants was published by the UK Government, 4 May 2020. However, it notes that: "Permission to publish names was requested from all participants. Those who did not give permission have not been named." In addition: "These meetings are also regularly attended by officials from Her Majesty’s Government. These attendees have not been named." No reason for the secrecy is provided. Two attendees did not give permission to be named. Attendees as of May 2020 included:

- Sir Patrick Vallance, Government Chief Scientific Adviser
- Professor Chris Whitty, Chief Medical Officer (England) and Chief Scientific Adviser, Department of Health and Social Care
- Professor John Aston, Chief Scientific Adviser, Home Office
- Professor Wendy Barclay, Imperial College London
- Professor Phil Blythe, Chief Scientific Adviser, Department for Transport
- Professor Sir Ian Boyd, University of St Andrews
- Professor Andrew Curran, Chief Scientific Adviser, Health and Safety Executive
- Dr Gavin Debrera, Public Health England
- Professor Sir Ian Diamond, National Statistician, Office for National Statistics
- Professor Yvonne Doyle, Medical Director, Public Health England
- Professor John Edmunds, London School of Hygiene and Tropical Medicine
- Professor Sir Jeremy Farrar, Director, Wellcome Trust
- Dr Aidan Fowler, National Health Service England
- Professor Julia Gog, University of Cambridge
- Dr David Halpern, Behavioural Insights Team, Cabinet Office
- Dr Jenny Harries, Deputy Chief Medical Officer
- Dr Demis Hassabis, Personal capacity as a data scientist
- Professor Peter Horby, University of Oxford
- Dr Indra Joshi, NHSX
- Professor Dame Theresa Marteau, University of Cambridge
- Professor Dame Angela McLean, Chief Scientific Adviser, Ministry of Defence
- Professor Graham Medley, London School of Hygiene & Tropical Medicine
- Professor Andrew Morris, University of Edinburgh
- Professor Carole Mundell, Chief Scientific Adviser, Foreign and Commonwealth Office
- Professor Catherine Noakes, University of Leeds
- Dr Rob Orford, Welsh Government
- Professor Michael Parker, University of Oxford
- Professor Sharon Peacock, Public Health England
- Professor Alan Penn, Chief Scientific Adviser, Ministry of Housing, Communities and Local Government
- Professor Stephen Powis, National Health Service England
- Dr Mike Prentice, National Health Service England
- Mr Osama Rahman, Chief Scientific Adviser, Department for Education
- Professor Venki Ramakrishnan, ex-officio as Chair of DELVE, convened by the Royal Society
- Professor Andrew Rambaut, University of Edinburgh
- Professor Tom Rodden, Chief Scientific Adviser, Department for Digital, Culture, Media and Sport
- Professor Brooke Rogers, King's College London
- Dr James Rubin, King's College London
- Professor Calum Semple, University of Liverpool
- Dr Mike Short, Chief Scientific Adviser, Department for International Trade
- Dr Gregor Smith, Scottish Government, Chief Medical Officer
- Professor Sir David Spiegelhalter, University of Cambridge
- Professor Jonathan Van-Tam, Deputy Chief Medical Officer
- Professor Russell Viner, University College London
- Professor Charlotte Watts, Chief Scientific Adviser, Department for International Development
- Professor Mark Walport, UK Research and Innovation
- Professor Mark Woolhouse, University of Edinburgh
- Professor Lucy Yardley, University of Bristol
- Professor Ian Young, Northern Ireland Executive
- Professor Maria Zambon, Public Health England

=== July 2020 ===
In July 2020, the participants list was updated to reflect recent meetings. Professor Neil Ferguson was featured on the list. As of 19 November, the list remained unchanged and included:

- Sir Patrick Vallance FMedSci FRS, Government Chief Scientific Adviser
- Professor Chris Whitty CB FMedSci, Chief Medical Officer (England) and Chief Scientific Adviser, Department of Health and Social Care
- Professor Rebecca Allen, University of Oxford
- Professor John Aston, Chief Scientific Adviser, Home Office
- Professor Charles Bangham, Imperial College London
- Professor Wendy Barclay FMedSci, Imperial College London
- Professor Jonathan Benger, UWE Bristol
- Fliss Bennee, Welsh Government
- Mr Allan Bennett, Public Health England
- Professor Phil Blythe, Chief Scientific Adviser, Department for Transport
- Professor Chris Bonnell, London School of Hygiene and Tropical Medicine
- Professor Sir Ian Boyd FRSE, University of St Andrews
- Professor Peter Bruce, University of Oxford
- Caroline Cake, HDR-UK
- Professor Andrew Curran, Chief Scientific Adviser, Health and Safety Executive
- Professor Paul Cosford, Public Health England
- Dr Gavin Dabrera, Public Health England
- Professor Sir Ian Diamond FRSE FBA, National Statistician, Office for National Statistics
- Professor Yvonne Doyle CB, Medical Director, Public Health England
- Professor Deborah Dunn-Walters, University of Surrey
- Professor John Edmunds OBE FMedSci, London School of Hygiene and Tropical Medicine
- Professor Sir Jeremy Farrar FMedSci FRS, Director, Wellcome Trust
- Professor Michael Ferguson, University of Dundee
- Professor Neil Ferguson OBE FMedSci, Imperial College London
- Professor Kevin Fenton, Public Health England
- Dr Aidan Fowler FRCS, National Health Service England
- Professor Julia Gog, University of Cambridge
- Professor Robin Grimes, Chief Scientific Adviser, Ministry of Defence
- Dr Ian Hall, University of Manchester
- Dr David Halpern, Behavioural Insights Team, Cabinet Office
- Dido Harding, NHSI
- Dr Jenny Harries OBE, Deputy Chief Medical Officer
- Dr Demis Hassabis FRS, Personal capacity as a data scientist
- Professor Andrew Hayward, UCL
- Professor Gideon Henderson, Chief Scientific Adviser, Defra
- Professor Peter Horby, University of Oxford
- Professor Anne Johnson, UCL
- Dr Indra Joshi, NHSx
- Dr Vittal Katikireddi, University of Glasgow
- Dr Ben Killingley, UCLH
- Professor David Lalloo, Liverpool School of Hygiene and Tropical Medicine
- Professor Janet Lord, University of Birmingham
- Professor Dame Theresa Marteau FMedSci, University of Cambridge
- Professor Dame Angela McLean FRS, Chief Scientific Adviser, Ministry of Defence
- Dr Jim McMenamin, Health Protection Scotland
- Professor Graham Medley, London School of Hygiene & Tropical Medicine
- Dr Laura Merson, University of Oxford
- Professor Susan Michie FAcSS FMedSci, University College London
- Professor Christine Middlemiss, Chief Veterinary Officer
- Professor Andrew Morris FMedSci FRSE, University of Edinburgh
- Professor Paul Moss, University of Birmingham
- Professor Carole Mundell, Chief Scientific Adviser, Foreign and Commonwealth Office
- Professor Catherine Noakes, University of Leeds
- Dr Rob Orford, Welsh Government
- Professor Michael Parker, University of Oxford
- Professor Sharon Peacock FMedSci, Public Health England
- Professor Alan Penn, Chief Scientific Adviser, Ministry of Housing, Communities and Local Government
- Dr Pasi Penttinen, European Centre for Disease Prevention and Control
- Professor Guy Poppy, Chief Scientific Adviser, Food Standards Agency
- Professor Steve Powis FRCP, National Health Service England
- Dr Mike Prentice, National Health Service England
- Mr Osama Rahman, Chief Scientific Adviser, Department for Education
- Professor Venki Ramakrishnan PRS, Ex Officio as Chair of DELVE, convened by the Royal Society
- Professor Andrew Rambaut FRSE, University of Edinburgh
- Professor Tom Rodden, Chief Scientific Adviser, Department for Digital, Culture, Media and Sport
- Professor Brooke Rogers OBE, King's College London
- Dr Cathy Roth, Department for International Development
- David Seymour, HDR-UK
- Professor Sheila Rowan MBE FRS FRSE, Chief Scientific Adviser, Scotland
- Alaster Smith, Department for Education
- Professor Iyiola Solanke, University of Leeds
- Dr Nicola Steedman, Scottish Government
- Dr James Rubin, King's College London
- Professor Calum Semple, University of Liverpool
- Dr Mike Short CBE, Chief Scientific Adviser, Department for International Trade
- Dr Gregor Smith, Scottish Government Chief Medical Officer
- Professor Sir David Spiegelhalter FRS, University of Cambridge
- Professor Jonathan Van Tam MBE, Deputy Chief Medical Officer
- Professor Russell Viner PRCPCH, University College London
- Professor Charlotte Watts CMG FMedSci, Chief Scientific Adviser, Department for International Development
- Dr Rhoswyn Walker, HDR-UK
- Professor Sir Mark Walport FRCP FMedSci FRS, UK Research and Innovation
- Professor Mark Wilcox, University of Leeds
- Professor Lucy Yardley FAcSS, University of Bristol and University of Southampton
- Professor Ian Young, Northern Ireland Executive
- Professor Maria Zambon FMedSci, Public Health England

=== March 2021 ===
The following were included on the minutes of a 11 March meeting:

Scientific experts:

- Patrick Vallance (GCSA)
- Chris Whitty (CMO)
- Angela McLean (MOD)
- Calum Semple (Liverpool)
- Catherine Noakes (Leeds)
- Charlotte Deane (UKRI)
- Charlotte Watts (FCDO CSA)
- Chris Dye (Royal Society)
- Chris Savoury (DHSC)
- Clare Gardiner (DHSC)
- Colin Humphreys (Queen Mary)
- David Crossman (Scotland)
- Derek Smith (Cambridge)
- Fliss Bennee (Wales)
- Graham Medley (LSHTM)
- Harry Rutter (Bath)
- Ian Boyd (St Andrews)
- Ian Diamond (ONS)
- James Rubin (KCL)
- Jeanelle de Gruchy (ADPH)
- Jenny Harries (DHSC)
- Jeremy Farrar (Wellcome)
- John Edmunds (LSHTM)
- Kamlesh Khunti (Leicester)
- Linda Partridge (Royal Society)
- Lucy Yardley (Bristol/Southampton)
- Maria Zambon (PHE)
- Mark Walport (UKRI)
- Mark Wilcox (NHS)
- Michael Parker (Oxford)
- Nicola Steedman (Scotland dCMO)
- Paul Cleary (DHSC)
- Peter Horby (Oxford)
- Rob Orford (Wales Health CSA)
- Sharon Peacock (PHE)
- Stephen Powis (NHS England)
- Stuart Elborn (QUB, Non-Executive Director of the Regulatory and Quality Improvement Agency, Northern Ireland))
- Susan Hopkins (PHE/NHSTT)
- Wei Shen Lim (JCVI)
- Wendy Barclay (Imperial)
- Yvonne Doyle (PHE)

Observers and government officials:

- Achim Wolf (NHSTT)
- Alan Penn (MHCLG CSA)
- Andrew Curran (HSE CSA)
- Andrew Morris (HDR UK)
- Ben Warner (No.10)
- Christopher Williams (PHW)
- Daniel Kleinberg (Scotland)
- Gideon Henderson (Defra CSA)
- Giri Shankar (PHW)
- Jennifer Rubin (HO CSA)
- Jim McMenamin (HPS)
- Julian Fletcher (CO)
- Laura Gilbert (No.10)
- Liz Lalley (WG)
- Louise Tinsley (HMT)
- Osama Rahman (DfE CSA)
- Paul Monks (BEIS CSA)
- Phil Blythe (DfT CSA)
- Rob Harrison (CO)
- Tom Mottershead (DHSC)
- Tom Rodden (DCMS CSA)

Secretariat:

- Laura Eden
- Simon Whitfield
- Stuart Wainwright

=== July 2021 ===
The following were added to the list of participants:

- Lucy Chappell (King's College London and DHSC CSA)
- Paul Kellam (Imperial College London, adviser to the Vaccine Taskforce)
- Thomas Waite (Deputy CMO for England, adviser to Joint Biosecurity Centre)

== Criticism and developments ==
An April 2020 article in The Guardian written by Richard Coker cited SAGE as a potential example of "scientific groupthink" in which disagreement and/or conflicting views are minimised to reach a consensus. Although disagreement is not preferable, this may ultimately lead to potentially irrational decision-making as counter views are not encouraged.

On 24 October 2020, The Spectator, while noting that SAGE minutes are published, called for a publication of the data used by SAGE, including NHS occupancy data, that were employed by it to justify the decisions it made. The editors remarked how in France hospital occupancy data were indeed published daily, while they were told by the NHS to submit a Freedom of Information request, which can take up to 28 days.

== Independent SAGE ==
The questions raised about the transparency of SAGE and possible political interference during the COVID-19 pandemic raised concerns about trust in public health messaging by opposition parties and others. As an alternative, a group of scientists created Independent SAGE, chaired by Sir David Anthony King, a former Government Chief Scientific Advisor, in early May 2020 to "provide a clear structure on which an effective policy should be based given the inevitability that the virus will continue to cross borders". Later that month, Independent SAGE warned against ending lock-down prematurely in places like schools.

== See also ==
- Advisory Committee on Dangerous Pathogens (ACDP)
- Joint Committee on Vaccination and Immunisation (JCVI)
- New and Emerging Respiratory Virus Threats Advisory Group (NERVTAG)
