= Brooke Rogers =

British psychologist

Marian Brooke Rogers OBE
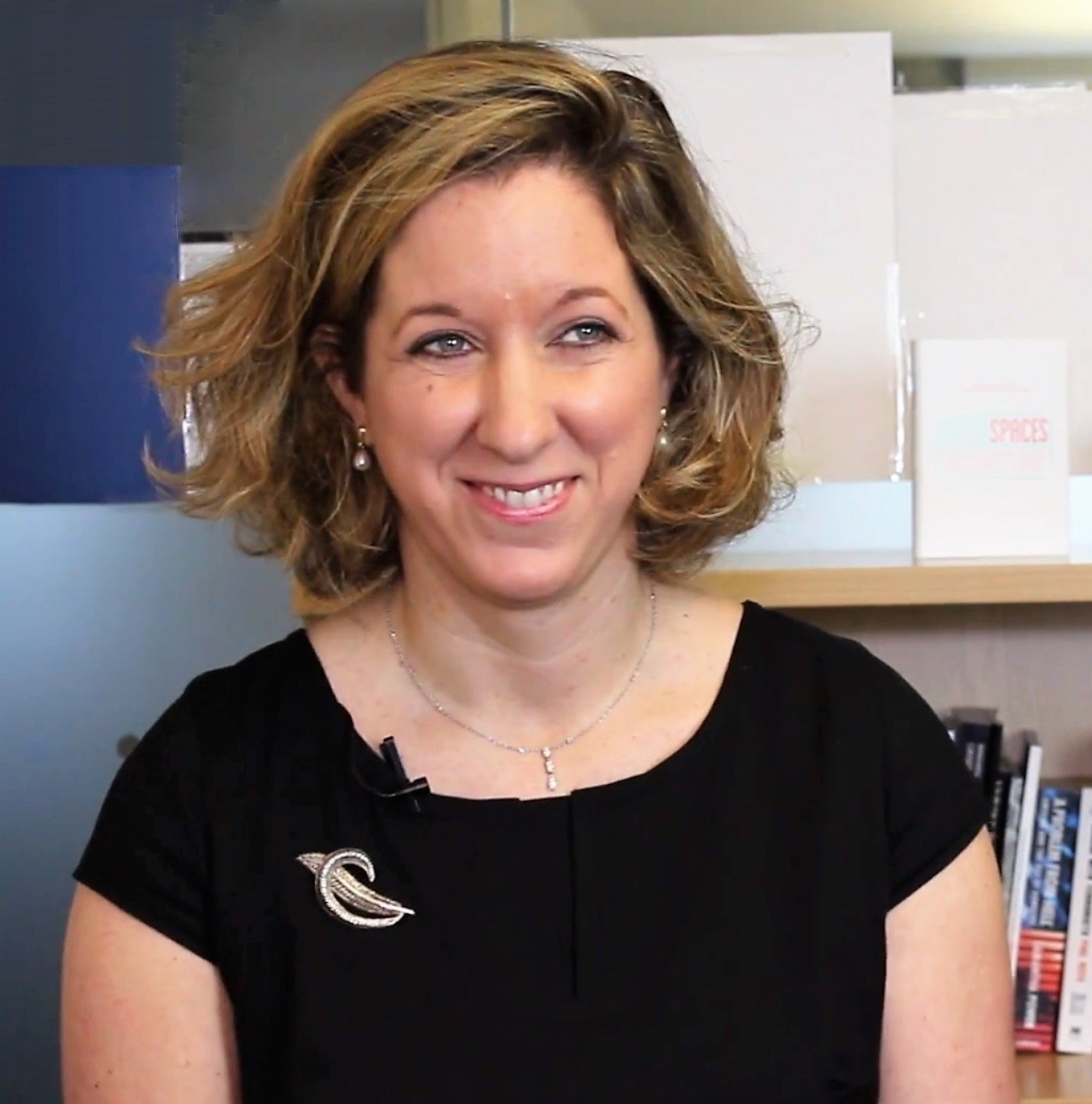
- Rogers speaks to the War Studies KCL department in 2013
- Education: Rollins College (USA)
- Scientific career
- Workplaces: King's College London
- Thesis: Religious identity, religiosity and self-esteem : perceived relationships within a multi-dimensional framework (2003)
- Website: Brooke Rogers at King's College London

Marian Brooke Rogers OBE is a British psychologist who is a Professor of Behavioural Science and Security at King's College London where she is Vice Dean (People & Planning) in the Faculty of Social Science and Public Policy (SSPP). She is a social psychologist who studies risk and threat. In 2014 she was asked to chair the Cabinet Office Behavioural Science Expert Group (BSEG). In 2019 she was appointed Chair of the Home Office Science Advisory Council (HOSAC). Professor Rogers was appointed to the Prime Minister's Council for Science and Technology in 2020. In 2025, she was appointed Chief Scientific Adviser at the Home Office.

== Early life and education ==
Rogers trained in social psychology and specialised in the study of the relationship between attitudes, beliefs, and behaviour. She obtained her PhD degree from Royal Holloway, University of London in 2003. After earning her doctorate, Rogers joined the University of Leeds as a postdoctoral researcher before moving to King's College London as a research fellow in the King's Centre for Risk Management. Her early work explored the formation of religious attitudes and beliefs and the impact of these attitudes and believes on behaviour and mental health. Her interest in the interactions between attitudes, beliefs, and behaviour evolved and led her to explore risk perception and risk communication across a variety of contexts (e.g., doctor-patient communication in paediatric cardiac care; public understanding of medicines information; public perceptions of nuclear power; public responses to terrorist events, etc.). Some of her earliest investigations into chemical, biological, radiological, and nuclear (CBRN) events looked to support hospitals in their planning for radiological warfare.

== Research and career ==
Her research considers risk perception and the communication of risk. She draws upon and generates evidence to inform the development of strategies and training to make society safer, and works with governments and industry to implement evidence-based planning and communication strategies. She has studied how emergency organisations can more effectively communicate during crises. She was asked to set up and chair the Cabinet Office's National Risk Assessment and National Security Risk Assessment Behavioural Science Expert Group (BSEG) in 2014. The National Risk Register collates evidence that discusses natural disasters and high impact events.. Rogers's work has contributed to the evidence-base that has shifted the popular practitioner belief that the public were likely to panic when facing disaster towards a more nuanced view incorporating a range of behavioural responses to extreme events. Most importantly, there is a growing recognition that under-response can be just as dangerous as over-response. She has since worked with the OECD, NATO Defense Against Terrorism and the International Atomic Energy Agency.

She was made an Officer of the Order of the British Empire (OBE) in the 2018 New Year Honours. Rogers was appointed Chair of the Home Office Science Advisory Council in 2019. In this capacity she advises the Home Office on policy related to science and engineering. During the COVID-19 pandemic Rogers highlighted the importance of Government of the United Kingdom adopting an evidence-based approach to high-impact risks such as pandemics. This holds true for the UK National Risk Register, which she has helped to inform and assess every two years. The UK National Risk Register illustrates that of all potential risks, an influenza pandemic has the potential to have the most severe impact, and the highest likelihood of occurring in the next five years. Rogers argues that The Civil Contingencies Act 2004 set out roles and a range of duties for organisations to establish and test plans for preparing for pandemic response. In spite of this forward planning, pandemic response will pose a significant challenge.

She is one of the 23 attendees of the Scientific Advisory Group for Emergencies (Sage), advising the United Kingdom government on the COVID-19 pandemic. Rogers co-chaired the SAGE sub-group, the Independent Scientific Pandemic Insights Group on Behaviours (SPI-B), during the COVID-19 Pandemic. Her evidence submitted to the UK Covid-19 Inquiry can be found here and here.

== Selected publications ==
- Rubin, G James; Rogers, M Brooke (August 2019). "Behavioural and psychological responses of the public during a major power outage: A literature review" (PDF). International Journal of Disaster Risk Reduction. 38 101226. Bibcode:2019IJDRR..3801226R. doi:10.1016/j.ijdrr.2019.101226. S2CID 198751724.
- Pearce, Julia M.; Lindekilde, Lasse; Parker, David; Rogers, M. Brooke (20 March 2019). "Communicating with the Public About Marauding Terrorist Firearms Attacks: Results from a Survey Experiment on Factors Influencing Intention to 'Run, Hide, Tell' in the United Kingdom and Denmark". Risk Analysis. 39 (8): 1675–1694. doi:10.1111/risa.13301. PMID 30893483.
- Aplin, Dylan; Rogers, Marian Brooke (5 June 2019). "'Alert not alarm': The UK experience of public counter-terrorism awareness and training, with explicit reference to Project ARGUS" (PDF). The Police Journal: Theory, Practice and Principles. 93 (3): 167–182. doi:10.1177/0032258X19851537. S2CID 198765374.
- Pearce, Julia M.; Parker, David; Lindekilde, Lasse; Bouhana, Noemie; Rogers, M. Brooke (19 April 2019). "Encouraging public reporting of suspicious behaviour on rail networks" (PDF). Policing and Society. 30 (7): 835–853. doi:10.1080/10439463.2019.1607340. S2CID 150465946.
- Heard, Claire Louise; Pearce, Julia M.; Rogers, M. Brooke (24 June 2019). "Mapping the public first-aid training landscape: uptake, knowledge, confidence and willingness to deliver first aid in disasters/emergencies– a scoping review" (PDF). Disasters. 45 (1): 252. doi:10.1111/disa.12374. PMID 31232480. S2CID 195329101.
- Bell, Alison J.C.; Rogers, M. Brooke; Pearce, Julia M. (March 2019). "The insider threat: Behavioral indicators and factors influencing likelihood of intervention". International Journal of Critical Infrastructure Protection. 24: 166–176. doi:10.1016/j.ijcip.2018.12.001.
- Parker, David; Pearce, Julia M.; Lindekilde, Lasse; Rogers, M. Brooke (19 July 2018). "Press coverage of lone-actor terrorism in the UK and Denmark: shaping the reactions of the public, affected communities and copycat attackers". Critical Studies on Terrorism. 12 (1): 110–131. doi:10.1080/17539153.2018.1494792. S2CID 150096844.
