= Bruce Ponder =

English geneticist and cancer researcher

Sir Bruce Ponder
- Born: Bruce Anthony John Ponder; 25 April 1944 (age 82)
- Education: University of Cambridge (MA, MB BChir); University of London (PhD)
- Awards: Knight Bachelor (2008); FMedSci; FRS (2001)
- Scientific career
- Fields: Cancer
- Workplaces: University of Cambridge
- Thesis: The Nucleoprotein Complexes of Polyoma Virus (1977)
- Doctoral advisor: Lionel Crawford
- Website: www.oncology.cam.ac.uk/research/groupleaders/ponder.html

Sir Bruce Anthony John Ponder FMedSci FAACR FRS FRCP (born 25 April 1944) is an English geneticist and cancer researcher. He is Emeritus Professor of Oncology at the University of Cambridge and former director of the Cancer Research UK Cambridge Institute and of the Cancer Research UK Cambridge Cancer Centre.

== Education ==
Ponder was educated at Charterhouse School and Jesus College, Cambridge. He trained in medicine at St Thomas' Hospital, London, and carried out his PhD studies as an Imperial Cancer Research Fund Clinical Fellow with Lionel Crawford in London working on chromatin organisation and DNA sequence specificity using polyoma virus.

== Research ==
After completing training in medical oncology, Ponder obtained a 5 year Career Development award from the UK Cancer Research Campaign at The Royal Marsden hospital and The Institute of Cancer Research, London, in which he combined laboratory and clinical research.

He first studied cancer as a breakdown of the normal rules of tissue organisation. To do this he developed new methods to measure the competition between the progeny of normal dividing cells in the lining of mouse intestine, and showed that the descendants of one cell would always by chance ‘win’ over all the others and populate the structural unit known as the ‘crypt’. When transgenic technologies became available, others including Ponder’s former lab member Doug Winton built on this and showed that a cancer mutation could confer an advantage, so that a future cancer cell would outcompete surrounding normal cells, and moreover that this advantage was increased by concomitant inflammation.

In his clinical work, Ponder began to study familial cancers. ‘Cancer families’ had long been recognised and suspected to have an inherited basis, but the genes were unknown. In the late 1970s Ponder and many others saw the potential to use new methods of linkage analysis using restriction fragment polymorphisms to discover the underlying genes. In 1980 Ponder set up a Familial Cancer clinic, new in the UK, at the Royal Marsden Hospital, and from this base he founded and led a multidisciplinary ‘UK Familial Cancer Study Group’ to promote the study of the genetics, epidemiology and clinical management of familial cancers. Focussing on Multiple endocrine neoplasia type 2 he described (with Doug Easton) the genetic patterns of the component cancers, and in 1993 identified ret as the causative gene. This allowed genetic testing to identify family members at risk, in whom cancer might be avoided by prophylactic surgery.

Turning to commoner cancers, during the late 1980s and the early 1990s, Ponder co-founded and was the first chair of the International Breast Cancer Linkage Consortium which made major contributions to the identification of the breast cancer susceptibility genes BRCA1 (by M-C King) and BRCA2 (by M Stratton and A Ashworth). Over the next decade the Consortium coordinated a large international effort which defined the genetic epidemiology of both the BRCA-related and other non-BRCA familial breast and ovarian cancers.

By the mid 1990s it was clear that there were many more small family clusters of breast cancer than would be expected by chance, and most were not due to mutations in BRCA-like genes. Like other familial resemblance, these family clusters were likely to be the combined effect of normal small genetic variations in many hundreds of different genes: so-called ‘polygenic inheritance’. Ponder, with colleagues Pharoah and Easton, showed that these families account for a substantial component of breast cancer, with potential opportunities for prevention. To find the genes by ‘genome wide association studies’ was a challenge. Ponder and Easton, with David Cox at Perlegen Sciences, met this challenge by adapting a technology for high throughput typing of DNA variations which had been developed for a different purpose by Cox. In 2007 they published the first genome-wide association study for cancer, identifying 5 genes in which variants were linked to breast cancer risk, confirmed by replication of the result in 22 laboratories world-wide. The number of these genes is now close to 300. As more variants were found, Ponder’s group adapted the gene regulatory network approach pioneered by Califano to show how their effects combined to affect cellular processes and increase cancer risk.

== Career ==
After junior hospital posts in internal medicine (1968–73) at St Thomas’ Hospital London, Ponder was awarded a PhD Clinical Fellowship at ICRF, where he worked on chromatin organisation using polyoma virus as a model. In 1977 he worked with John Cairns on his book ‘Cancer, Science, and Society’ before starting medical oncology training as a Fellow at the Sidney Farber Cancer Institute, Harvard Medical School. Returning to the UK, he completed his oncology training and in 1980 started his research career with a 5-year Career Development Award from the UK Cancer Research Campaign (CRC) at the Institute for Cancer Research, and honorary Consultant Physician status at the Royal Marsden Hospital, London. Here, alongside his laboratory research, he opened his Familial Cancer clinic, followed by others at Guy’s and St Georges Hospitals, and in 1985 he became the first Head of a newly created Department of Cancer Genetics at the Institute for Cancer Research. In 1989, supported by the CRC, he moved his group to a new laboratory in the University Department of Pathology, University of Cambridge. In 1990 he became a Gibb Life Fellow of the CRC; in 1993 he was awarded a personal Chair in Cancer Genetics in Cambridge, and in 1995 he was appointed Professor and Head of the University Department of Oncology (in 2007 the chair was endowed as the Li Ka Shing Professor of Oncology).

As Head of Oncology, he set out in 1995 with three aims: to strengthen the clinical service and integrate it with research; to build a strong nucleus of cancer related laboratory and epidemiological research within the Clinical School; and from this base, to engage widely with relevant research across the University and local biotech. In 1997, with the Professor of Epidemiology, Nicholas Day, Ponder founded and was co-director of the Strangeways Research Laboratory for Genetic Epidemiology, with a focus on cancer. In 2001, he was founding co-director with Ron Laskey of the Hutchison/MRC Research Centre, containing a new MRC Cancer Cell Biology Unit. From 2002 Ponder began with senior colleagues to develop the Cambridge Cancer Centre. This began to build collaborations between researchers in Oncology, the Clinical School, Addenbrooke's Hospital, a wide range of Departments across the University of Cambridge, and local biotechnology companies. In 2004, he was appointed inaugural Director of a new Cancer Research UK Cambridge Research Institute (now called the Cancer Research UK Cambridge Institute), which opened in 2007. The Institute emphasised engagement across the research pathway, from basic science through to translational research, ensuring that research had clinical impact, and it further catalysed links across Cambridge and beyond.

In 2010, Ponder became the first Director of the Cambridge Cancer Centre, part of a new Cancer Research UK network of Cancer Centres across the UK. Under his leadership, in 2013 after review, Cambridge became one of only two Centres awarded ‘Major Centre’ status. Also in 2013, Ponder, as Head of Oncology, led the application through which the Cambridge Centre, linked with Addenbrookes Hospital, were awarded Comprehensive Cancer Centre status by the Organisation of European Cancer Institutes. Addenbrooke's was the first general hospital in Europe to be recognised in this way. Ponder also led the application and early stages of formal review by the European Academy of Cancer Sciences, through which, in 2017, the Cambridge Cancer Centre was one of only two Centres to be designated as a ‘European Centre of Excellence’.

== Awards and honours ==
Ponder has received a number of national and international awards, including the first Hamilton Fairley Fellowship of the Cancer Research Campaign (1977), a Gibb Life Fellowship of the Cancer Research Campaign (1990), the International Public Service Award of the US National Neurofibromatosis Association (1992), the Merck Prize of the European Thyroid Association (1997), the Croonian Lectureship of the Royal College of Physicians (1997), the Hamilton Fairley Award of the European Society for Medical Oncology (2004), the Bertner Award of the MD Anderson Cancer Center (2007), the Alfred Knudson Award for Cancer Genetics of the US National Cancer Institute (2008), the Ambuj Nath Bose Prize of the Royal College of Physicians (2008) and the Lifetime Achievement Award of Cancer Research UK (2013).

He was President of the British Association for Cancer Research (2010-2014) and a member of the Board of Directors of the American Association for Cancer Research (2008-2011). He was a founding Fellow of the UK Academy of Medical Sciences (1998), of the European Academy of Cancer Sciences (2010), and of the Academy of the American Association for Cancer Research (2013).

He was elected a Fellow of the Royal Society in 2001 and knighted for Services to Medicine in the 2008 New Year Honours list.

His nomination for the Royal Society reads:

Bruce Ponder is distinguished for his contributions to human cancer genetics and is a leader in the international collaborations which have led to the identification of genes predisposing for breast and ovarian cancer. His fundamental work on the intestine has underpinned subsequent studies of tumours in the intestinal epithelium.
