= Yvonne Doyle =

Yvonne Doyle may refer to:

- Yvonne Doyle (physician), Irish medical director and director of health protection for Public Health England
- Yvonne Doyle (Fair City), a character on the Irish soap opera Fair City
- Yvonne Doyle (tennis), Irish tennis player
