= Catherine Noakes =

British engineer

Catherine Noakes OBE FREng FIMechE FCIBSE
- Education: University of Leeds
- Scientific career
- Workplaces: University of Leeds
- Thesis: Slot Exit Flow Phenomena in Industrial Slide-Fed Coating Systems

Catherine Jane Noakes is a British mechanical engineer who is Professor of Environmental Engineering for Buildings at the University of Leeds. Noakes specialises in airborne infections and the transport of airborne pathogens. During the COVID-19 pandemic, Noakes served on the Government of the United Kingdom Scientific Advisory Group for Emergencies (SAGE).

== Early life and education ==
Noakes' parents had careers in computer science and aerospace engineering.

In 1996, Noakes received a BEng in mathematical engineering from the School of Mechanical Engineering at the University of Leeds. During this time she became interested in the mathematics of fluid dynamics. In 2000, Noakes received a PhD from the School of Mechanical Engineering at the University of Leeds, where she studied slow exit phenomena in slide-fed curtain coating systems, specifically for coating photographic paper, with a thesis entitled Slot Exit Flow Phenomena in Industrial Slide-Fed Coating Systems.

== Research and career ==
For a short time Noakes worked with the printing and coating company Delpro in Glossop, including on development of a drier used for coating Euro banknotes. However, in 2002 she moved to an academic post-doctoral position studying airflow and UV-C in disease prevention at the University of Leeds and subsequently gained a permanent position there.

Noakes investigates environmental fluid flow, with a focus on the ventilation of buildings and how this impacts indoor air quality. She develops mathematical models to assess the risk of airborne transmission, expanding on the Wells-Riley equation to include stochastic effects. As part of these efforts, Noakes has led collaborations with the National Health Service and Public Health England to prevent the spread of airborne viruses through hospitals. Airborne transmission is known to be an issue in tuberculosis and influenza. Noakes has developed computational tools to better monitor and control patient environments for infection control. In a presentation at the Bradford Festival of Science, Noakes revealed that one in fifty people acquire an infection during their time in hospital. The impact of these infections, and need for follow-up care, results in a major unnecessary expenditure.

In 2010 Noakes was made Director of the Pathogen Control Research Institute. Noakes is a member of the Engineering and Physical Sciences Research Council (EPSRC) Centre for Doctoral Training in Aerosol Science. Noakes was promoted to Professor in 2014. She serves on the editorial board of the Elsevier journal Building and Environment and the Wiley journal Indoor Air. From 2014 to 2017 Noakes led the University of Leeds Faculty of Engineering Athena SWAN scheme.

In 2016 Noakes started the Low-Energy Ventilation Network (LEVN), a team of people who look to better understand building physics. She has looked to understand whether indoor environments impact the cognitive performance of people inside. She serves as Deputy Director of the Leeds Institute of Fluid Dynamics, and co-directs their Centre for Doctoral Training.

During the COVID-19 pandemic, Noakes became interested in the airborne transmission of severe acute respiratory syndrome coronavirus 2 (SARS-CoV-2) and the related importance of ventilation to reduce the risk of inhaling small particles containing the virus. In April 2020 Noakes was appointed to the Government of the United Kingdom COVID-19 scientific advisory board. As a result of this work Noakes was one of the recipients of the Royal Academy of Engineering President's Special Awards for Pandemic Service.

Noakes was the guest on the BBC Radio 4 programme The Life Scientific in January 2021 and in October 2022 gave a lecture on Pandemic Resilience by controlling virus spread to the Manchester Literary and Philosophical Society

== Honours ==
- 2013: Institute of Healthcare Engineering and Estate Management, Fellow
- 2014: Institution of Mechanical Engineers, Fellow
- 2014: Institution of Mechanical Engineers, Construction and Building Services Division Prize
- 2016: University of Leeds, Women of Achievement Award
- 2018: International Society for Indoor Air Quality, Academy of Fellows
- 2020: Appointed Officer of the Order of the British Empire (OBE) in the 2020 Birthday Honours for services to the COVID-19 response.
- 2021: Elected a Fellow of the Royal Academy of Engineering.
- 2022: Chartered Institution of Building Services Engineers, Honorary Fellow
- 2023: Awarded the Gabor Medal of the Royal Society for "her pioneering contributions to infection risk modelling and her exceptional leadership in the field through groundbreaking research and a multidisciplinary approach".

== Selected publications ==
- Beggs, CB; Noakes, CJ; Sleigh, PA; Fletcher, LA; Siddiqi, K (November 2003). "The transmission of tuberculosis in confined spaces: an analytical review of alternative epidemiological models". The International Journal of Tuberculosis and Lung Disease. 7 (11): 1015–26. PMID 14598959. Wikidata ()
- Noakes, C. J.; Beggs, C. B.; Sleigh, P. A.; Kerr, K. G. (14 February 2006). "Modelling the transmission of airborne infections in enclosed spaces". Epidemiology and Infection. 134 (5): 1082–1091. doi:10.1017/s0950268806005875. PMC 2870476. PMID 16476170. Wikidata ()
- Beggs, Clive B.; Noakes, Catherine J.; Shepherd, Simon J.; Kerr, Kevin G.; Sleigh, P. Andrew; Banfield, Katherine (December 2006). "The influence of nurse cohorting on hand hygiene effectiveness". American Journal of Infection Control. 34 (10): 621–626. doi:10.1016/J.AJIC.2006.06.011. PMID 17161736. Wikidata ()
- Escombe, A Roderick; Moore, David A J; Gilman, Robert H; Navincopa, Marcos; Ticona, Eduardo; Mitchell, Bailey; Noakes, Catherine; Martínez, Carlos; Sheen, Patricia; Ramirez, Rocio; Quino, Willi; Gonzalez, Armando; Friedland, Jon S; Evans, Carlton A; Wilson, Peter (17 March 2009). "Upper-Room Ultraviolet Light and Negative Air Ionization to Prevent Tuberculosis Transmission". PLOS Medicine. 6 (3) e1000043. doi:10.1371/JOURNAL.PMED.1000043. PMC 2656548. PMID 19296717. Wikidata ()
