= Patrick Vallance =

British physician, scientist, and UK Government minister

The Right Honourable The Lord Vallance of Balham KCB FRS FMedSci FRCP HonFREng
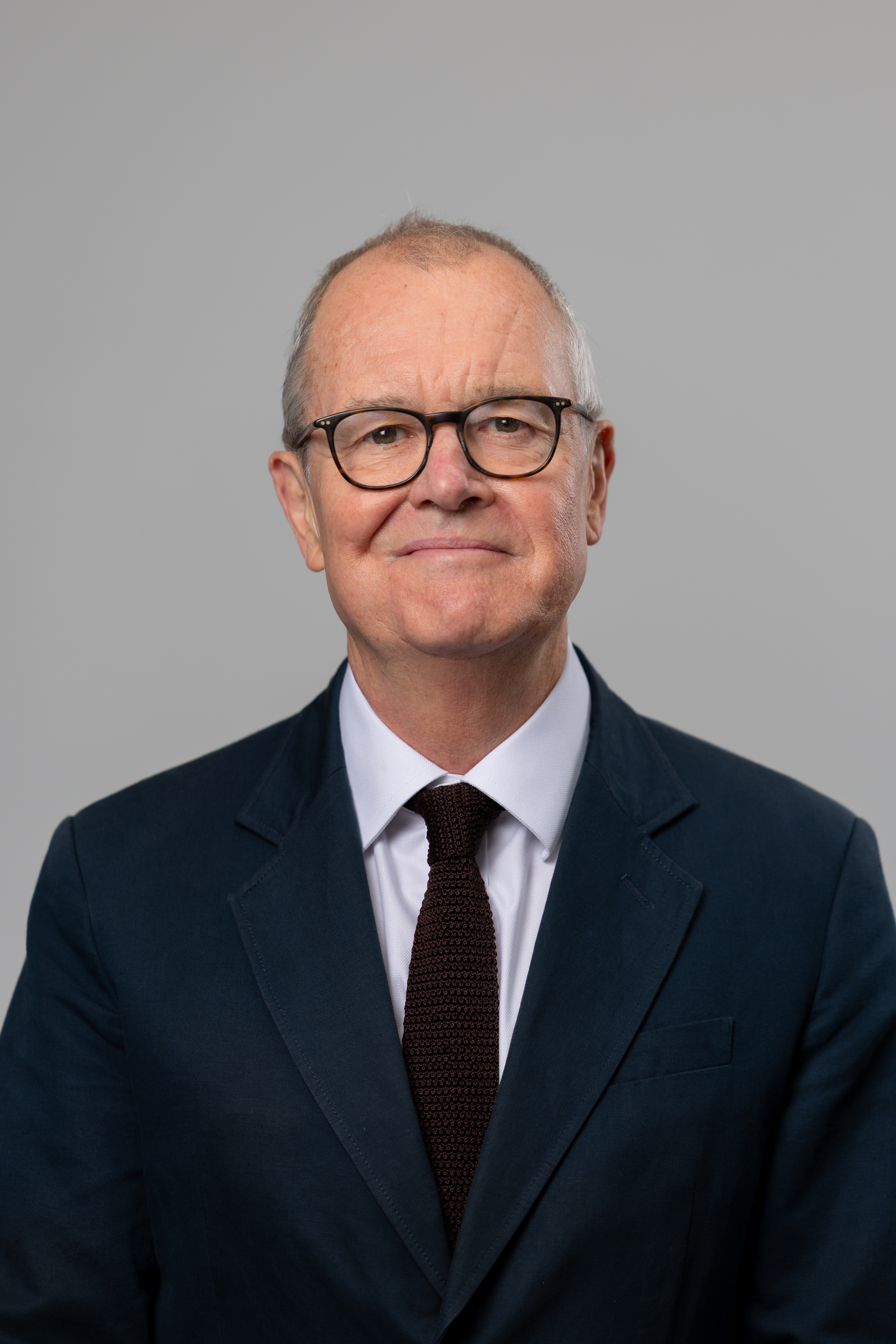
- Official portrait, 2025

Minister of State for Science, Innovation, Research and Nuclear (Note: Minister of State for Science, Research and Innovation from July 2024 until September 2025)
- In office 5 July 2024 – 20 July 2026
- Prime Minister: Keir Starmer
- Preceded by: Andrew Griffith
- Succeeded by: Chris McDonald

Government Chief Scientific Adviser
- In office 4 April 2018 – 2023
- Preceded by: Chris Whitty (interim)
- Succeeded by: Dame Angela McLean

National Technology Advisor
- In office 2020–2023
- Preceded by: Liam Maxwell
- Succeeded by: Dave Smith

Member of the House of Lords
- Lord Temporal
- Life peerage 17 July 2024

Personal details
- Born: Patrick John Thompson Vallance; 17 March 1960 (age 66) Essex, England
- Party: Labour
- Spouse: Sophia Ann Dexter (m. 1986)
- Children: 3
- Scientific career
- Education: St George's, University of London (BSc, MBBS)
- Awards: Goulstonian Lecture (1996); Royal Medal (2023)
- Workplaces: University College London; GlaxoSmithKline; Government of the United Kingdom; Government Office for Science

Patrick John Thompson Vallance, Baron Vallance of Balham (born 17 March 1960), is a British physician, scientist, life peer, and clinical pharmacologist who served as Minister of State for Science, Innovation, Research and Nuclear from 2024 to 2026. He served as HM Government chief scientific adviser from 2018 to 2023.

From 1986 to 1995, Vallance taught at St George's Hospital Medical School, where his research concentrated on vascular biology and endothelial cell physiology. In 1995, he was appointed a professor at UCL Medical School, and in 2002 he became head of UCL's department of medicine. From 2012 to 2018, he was president of Research and Development (R&D) at the global pharmaceutical company GlaxoSmithKline (GSK). He served as chairman of the Natural History Museum's board of trustees between 2022 and 2024.

In March 2020, as HM Government's Chief Scientific Adviser, Vallance appeared alongside Prime Minister Boris Johnson and Chris Whitty, Chief Medical Officer for England, in televised briefings on the COVID-19 pandemic. He was appointed a Knight Commander of the Order of the Bath (KCB) in the 2022 New Year Honours for services to public health.

== Early life and education ==
Patrick Vallance was born on 17 March 1960 to Peter Vallance and Barbara (née Thompson) in south-west Essex, now part of Greater London. His family later moved to Cornwall. Vallance was educated at Woodford Green Preparatory School and Buckhurst Hill County High School, and subsequently privately educated at Truro School. His early aspiration was to become a palaeontologist.

Vallance studied medicine at St George's, University of London, from 1978, where he was taught by Joe Collier, professor of Medicines Policy, and from which he received a Bachelor of Science degree in 1981 followed by a Bachelor of Medicine, Bachelor of Surgery (MBBS) degree in 1984. In addition to Collier, he has been inspired by physician Tom Pilkington and former Regius Professor of Physic at Cambridge Sir Keith Peters.

== Career and research ==
Prior to taking up senior positions with the pharmaceutical company GlaxoSmithKline (GSK) and later in the UK Government, Vallance spent several years in medical research.

=== St George's Hospital ===
From 1986 to 1995 Vallance taught at St George's Hospital Medical School, where his research concentrated on vascular biology and endothelial cell physiology. Prior to the discovery of the involvement of nitric oxide, it was believed that high blood pressure was usually a result of constrictor activity in blood vessels. Vallance performed studies which demonstrated the link between nitric oxide and blood pressure.

In 1987, with Joe Collier, he set out to investigate whether human blood vessels demonstrated endothelium-dependent relaxation, a term coined in 1980 by Robert F. Furchgott and John V. Zawadzki after discovering that a large blood vessel would not relax when its single-layered innermost lining was removed. Furchgott and Zawadzki subsequently showed that the occurrence was mediated by what they called endothelium-derived relaxing factor, later found to be nitric oxide, and it was shortly shown to occur in a variety of animals. Using veins from the back of a human hand, Vallance and Collier reproduced Furchgott and Zawadzki's findings. Subsequently, their team showed that the human arterial vasculature is actively dilated by a continuous release of nitric oxide. In 1991, Vallance and Salvador Moncada published a paper on the role of nitric oxide in cirrhosis, proposing an association between the changes in blood flow in cirrhosis and the vasoactive properties of nitric oxide. The following year they reported that the plasma concentrations of asymmetric dimethylarginine (ADMA) were elevated in people who were uraemic.

=== University College Hospital ===
From 1995 to 2002 he was a professor at UCL Medical School, then professor of Medicine from 2002 to 2006, and head of medicine. He was also registrar of the Academy of Medical Sciences. In 2005, as head of the division of medicine at UCL, he published a paper in the Journal of the Royal Society of Medicine, titled "A post-take ward round", in which he suggested that "reinvention of teams of doctors, nurses, therapists and social workers seems like an important task for general medicine".

=== GlaxoSmithKline ===
In 2006, in his mid-40s, Vallance joined GSK as head of drug discovery. Four years later he became head of medicines discovery and development, and in 2012 he was appointed head of research and development at GSK. Under his leadership, new medicines for cancer, asthma, autoimmune diseases and HIV infection were discovered and approved for use worldwide. He championed open innovation and novel industry-academic partnerships globally, and maintained a focus on the search for new antibiotics and treatments for tropical diseases.

=== UK Government ===
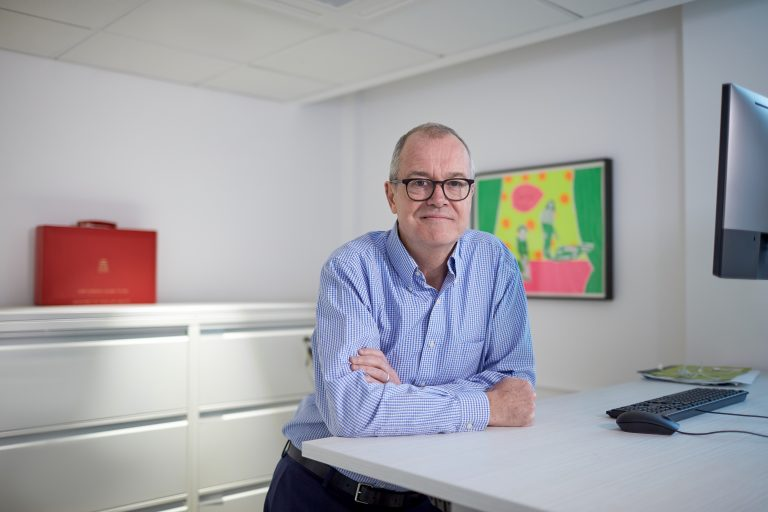
Lord Vallance in a Government photograph, displaying his ministerial red box behind him

In March 2018, Vallance left GSK, and on 4 April 2018 he began his five-year tenure as Chief Scientific Adviser to the UK Government, replacing the interim officeholder Chris Whitty. In this role he led the Government Office for Science, advising the Prime Minister and the Cabinet. In 2018, he was one of nine scientific advisers who, in a paper in Nature, called for "inclusive, rigorous, transparent, and accessible information for policy makers" and supported the Evidence-Based Research Network, established in 2016, to "lobby for all proposals for new research to be supported by references to systematic reviews of relevant existing research".

==== COVID-19 pandemic ====
In March 2020, as the Government's Chief Scientific Adviser, Vallance appeared alongside Prime Minister Boris Johnson and the Chief Medical Officer for the UK, Chris Whitty, in televised briefings on the COVID-19 pandemic. During some March 2020 TV interviews, he made comments interpreted by some as advocating for a "herd immunity" approach. However, in his second written statement to the UK COVID-19 Inquiry, he stated that he misspoke while trying to explain a "technically difficult concept", that interviews given that same day demonstrate that he was not advocating for such a policy, and the later published transcripts of SAGE demonstrate that no such policy was being considered or advocated by government scientific advisors including Vallance. Vallance stated in the same statement that he "regrets" his use of the term "herd immunity" in those instances.

His "herd immunity" approach was criticised by a group of 541 scientists from UK and international universities and research institutions, who expressed the view that this approach would put the NHS under additional stress and "risk many more lives than necessary". The 541 signatories work in epidemiology, computational modelling, applied mathematics, mathematical biology, probability theory, complex systems, computational biology, molecular medicine, amongst others.

In September, it emerged that Vallance owned a deferred bonus of 43,111 shares worth £600,000 in GlaxoSmithKline, a company which was working on developing a COVID vaccine. This led to claims of a potential conflict of interest, as Vallance could be seen to have a financial interest in pushing for a vaccine-based response to the pandemic whether or not this was objectively the best approach. Then Health Secretary Matt Hancock denied that this was the case, with a government spokesperson stating that, "Upon his appointment, appropriate steps were taken to manage the Government Chief Scientific Adviser's interests in line with advice provided at the time. The GCSA has no input into contractual and commercial decisions on vaccine procurement which are taken by Ministers following a robust cross-Government approvals regime".

After a televised briefing alongside Johnson and Whitty on 31 October, where a second "lockdown" was introduced for England, Vallance was criticised for showing two slides – projecting hospital admissions and deaths – which were later reissued with worst-case figures revised downward. Five days later, a statement from the Office for Statistics Regulation called for greater transparency in published data relating to the pandemic, including publication of data sources and modelling assumptions; the statement did not refer to any specific presentation but was linked by reporters to the 31 October briefing.

=== Minister of State for Science ===
On 5 July 2024, Vallance was appointed Minister of State for Science in the Department for Science, Innovation and Technology by Prime Minister Keir Starmer following the Labour Party's victory at the 2024 general election. He continued as Minister of State for Science, Innovation, Research and Nuclear following a reorganisation in September 2025.

On 17 July 2024 he was created a life peer, taking the title of Baron Vallance of Balham, of Balham in the London Borough of Wandsworth. He sits on the Labour benches in the House of Lords. In November 2024, Vallance gave the opening speech at the Royal Institute of Navigation annual seminar.

In November 2025, Vallance introduced a plan to phase out animal testing through increased use of artificial intelligence and 3D bioprinting.

Ahead of the formation of the Burnham ministry, Vallance resigned from the government on 20 July 2026.

=== Other work ===
In February 2024, Vallance joined the Tony Blair Institute for Global Change's team of strategic counsellors, advising the organisation on its global policy work.

=== Selected publications ===
Vallance's publications include:

- Hyperdynamic circulation in cirrhosis: a role for nitric oxide?
- Physiological importance of nitric oxide
- Exploring vascular nitric oxide in health and disease
- Nitric oxide in the human cardiovascular system
- Sildenafil: desired and undesired effects
- Four principles to make evidence synthesis more useful for policy

== Honours and awards ==
In 1995, Vallance was elected a Fellow of the Royal College of Physicians (FRCP). The following year he delivered the Goulstonian Lecture of the Royal College of Physicians, where he gave details of the connection between nitric oxide and blood pressure. In 1999 he was elected a Fellow of the Academy of Medical Sciences (FMedSci), and in 2002 he was awarded the Graham Bull Prize for Clinical Science. He was elected a Fellow of the Royal Society (FRS) in 2017 and an Honorary Fellow of the Royal Academy of Engineering (HonFREng) in 2022.

Vallance was appointed Knight Bachelor in the 2019 New Year Honours for "services to open clinical science". He was promoted Knight Commander of the Order of the Bath (KCB) in the 2022 New Year Honours for "services to science in government".

Vallance was awarded the Lister Medal by the Society of Chemical Industry in 2022, an award recognising prominent leaders working on important advancements for society in the medicinal field.

In 2023, he was awarded the Royal Medal by the Royal Society.

Following his appointment as Minister of State for Science, Vallance was elevated to the peerage as Baron Vallance of Balham, of Balham in the London Borough of Wandsworth, on 17 July 2024. He was introduced to the House of Lords on 18 July.

== Personal life ==
Vallance married Sophia Ann Dexter in 1986; they have two sons and one daughter. Dexter is a former general practitioner (GP) and honorary tutor at St. George's Hospital Medical School, and was a trustee of Cardboard Citizens from 2019 - 2021.

Business positions
Preceded by	Head of R&D at GSK; January 2012 – March 2018	Succeeded by Hal V. Barron
Government offices
Preceded by Chris Whitty; Acting	Government Chief Scientific Adviser; 2018–2023	Succeeded by Dame Angela McLean
Political offices
Preceded by Andrew Griffith	Minister of State for Science; 2024–present	Incumbent
Orders of precedence in the United Kingdom
Preceded by The Lord Tarassenko	Gentlemen; Baron Vallance of Balham	Followed by The Lord Timpson
