= Kamlesh Khunti =

British physician

Kamlesh Khunti CBE
- Education: University of Dundee
- Employer: University of Leicester

Kamlesh Khunti CBE is a British physician who is Professor of Primary Care Diabetes and Vascular Medicine at the University of Leicester. His research considers diabetes and public health. During the COVID-19 pandemic, Khunti studied the impact of COVID-19 on people living with diabetes. He served on the Scientific Advisory Group for Emergencies (SAGE). He is the director of the National Institute for Health and Care Research (NIHR) Applied Research Collaboration East Midlands.

== Early life and education ==
Khunti spent his childhood in Leicester. He studied medicine at the University of Dundee and started working as a general practitioner in Leicester in 1990. He was regularly named as one of the most influential GPs in the United Kingdom.

== Research and career ==
Khunti specialises in Type 2 diabetes and cardiovascular disease. His career in medical research began in the late nineties. He established the Leicester Diabetes Centre with Melanie Davies. He was elected a Fellow of the Academy of Medical Sciences and a professor at the University of Leicester in 2017. He is particularly focussed on reducing health inequalities. He was awarded the 2019 South Asian Health Foundation's Lifetime Achievement Award for his efforts to enhance the medical outcomes of South Asians. His research informed international guidelines for diabetes screening and management.

Throughout the COVID-19 pandemic, Khunti studied the impact of COVID-19 on people from ethnic minority backgrounds and people living with disabilities. He also studied the effectiveness of various types of face masks or primary health professionals. He served on the independent Scientific Advisory Group for Emergencies from 2020 to 2021.

Khunti was appointed Commander of the Order of the British Empire (CBE) in the 2022 New Year Honours for services to health.

== Selected publications ==
- Ali S; Stone MA; Peters JL; Davies MJ; Khunti K (2006). "The prevalence of co-morbid depression in adults with Type 2 diabetes: a systematic review and meta-analysis". Diabetic Medicine. 23 (11): 1165–1173. doi:10.1111/j.1464-5491.2006.01943.x. PMID 17054590. Wikidata Q36630078.
- Gillies, Clare; Abrams, Keith Rowland; Lambert, Paul Christopher; Nicola J Cooper; Sutton, Alex; Ron T Hsu; Kamlesh Khunti (2007). "Pharmacological and lifestyle interventions to prevent or delay type 2 diabetes in people with impaired glucose tolerance: systematic review and meta-analysis". The BMJ. 334 (7588): 299. doi:10.1136/bmj.39063.689375.55. PMC 1796695. PMID 17237299. Wikidata Q30829257.
- Carter, Patrice; Gray, Laura; Jacqui Troughton; Kamlesh Khunti; Davies, Melanie Jane (2010). "Fruit and vegetable intake and incidence of type 2 diabetes mellitus: systematic review and meta-analysis". The BMJ. 341 (aug18 4) c4229. doi:10.1136/bmj.c4229. PMC 2924474. PMID 20724400. Wikidata Q24630267.
