= Migration and Global Environmental Change =

Migration and Global Environmental Change was a report about the influence of climate change on patterns of human migration and displacement published in 2011. The report was produced by the Foresight unit at the UK's Government Office of Science. It became known colloquially as 'The Foresight Report' among people working in the field of climate-linked migration. The report was led by Professor Richard Black of Sussex University.

The report was one of the first assessments of all the existing evidence and research on the connections between climate change and migration. The report authors also commissioned a number of new peer reviewed articles on migration and climate change, significant adding to the evidence base of the topic. The report attracted significant media attention on its release.

The report was critical of previous predictions of the number of people who could be forced to move by climate change. It argued that making such numerical predictions was impossible because attributing climate change as the sole cause of someone's migration was difficult.

The report popularized the idea of trapped populations. The report argued that as well as being forced to move by climate change impacts, people might also be forced to stay where they are. The report drew on evidence showing that as people become poorer as a result of a degraded environment, they become less able to migrate. The idea of trapped populations had been present in the academic literature for sometime, however the media attention results from the release of the report brought the idea to a wider public for the first time.

The report also popularized the idea of migration as climate change adaptation. Again, the authors drew on existing academic literature on the topic. They made the case that migration should be seen as a legitimate and empowering way for some people to adapt to the impacts of climate change.
