= Enter Arsène Lupin =

1944 film by Ford Beebe

Enter Arsene Lupin
- Directed by: Ford Beebe
- Screenplay by: Bertram Millhauser
- Based on: Maurice Leblance (as Maurice Le Blance) (based on character created by)
- Produced by: Ford Beebe; Joseph Gershenson
- Starring: Charles Korvin; Ella Raines
- Cinematography: Hal Mohr
- Edited by: Saul A. Goodkind
- Music by: Milton Rosen
- Color process: Black and white
- Production company: Universal Pictures
- Distributed by: Universal Pictures
- Release date: November 24, 1944
- Running time: 72 minutes
- Country: United States
- Language: English

Enter Arsène Lupin is a 1944 American film noir directed by Ford Beebe and starring Charles Korvin and Ella Raines. It features the French gentlemen thief Arsène Lupin, a creation of the writer Maurice Leblanc. Lupin keeps watch on a young woman whose jewels make a tempting target for a gang of thieves. It was made by Universal Pictures.

== Plot ==
French jewel thief Lupin (Charles Korvin) robs an heiress (Ella Raines) on a train, then follows her to England and saves her life.

== Cast ==
- Charles Korvin as Arsene Lupin
- Ella Raines as Stacie Kanares
- J. Carrol Naish as Ganimard
- George Dolenz as Dubose
- Gale Sondergaard as Bessie Seagrave
- Miles Mander as Charles Seagrave
- Leyland Hodgson as Constable Ryder
- Tom Pilkington as Pollett
- Lillian Bronson as Wheeler
- Holmes Herbert as Jobson
- Charles La Torre as Inspector Cogswell
- Gerald Hamer as Doc Marling
- Ted Cooper as Cartwright
- Art Foster as Superintendent
- Clyde Kenney as Beckwith
- Alphonse Martell as Conductor

== See also ==
- List of American films of 1944
