= Meera Chand =

British microbiologist

- Occupation: Consultant, microbiologist
- Employer: Guy's and St Thomas' NHS Foundation Trust; Public Health England

Meera A. Chand is a British microbiologist, working at Public Health England (PHE) and as a consultant with the Department of Infectious Diseases, Guy's and St Thomas' NHS Foundation Trust.

She is also a clinical research fellow into severe acute respiratory infections at Imperial College London.

Chand is one of the 23 attendees of the Scientific Advisory Group for Emergencies (Sage), advising the United Kingdom government on the COVID-19 pandemic She was also involved in the United Kingdom response to the Ebola epidemic and has worked in cases of listeriosis, influenza, diphtheria, scarlet fever and monkeypox.
