= Paul Kellam =

British virologist (born 1965)

Paul Kellam (born 1965) is a Professor of Viral Genomics at Imperial College London and vice-president of infectious diseases and vaccines at Kymab Ltd. He is co-author of the Oxford textbook Human Virology.

== Education ==
Kellam attended Oakwood Park Grammar School. He received a Bachelor Science in Microbiology from the University of Reading in 1987 and a PhD in Virology from the University of London in 1994.

== Advisory panels ==
As of 2021, Professor Kellam sits on the PHE Serology Working Group as a member of the Scientific Advisory Group for Emergencies in response to COVID-19.

Kellam is chair of the Microbiology Society Policy Committee.

== Awards and honours ==
He was elected a Fellow of the American Academy of Microbiology, American Society for Microbiology, July 2015 and Fellow of the Academy of Medical Sciences in 2026.

== Selected works ==
- Leslie Collier; Paul Kellam; John Oxford (2016). Human Virology. Oxford University Press. ISBN 978-0-19-871468-2.
