= Indra Joshi =

British medical doctor

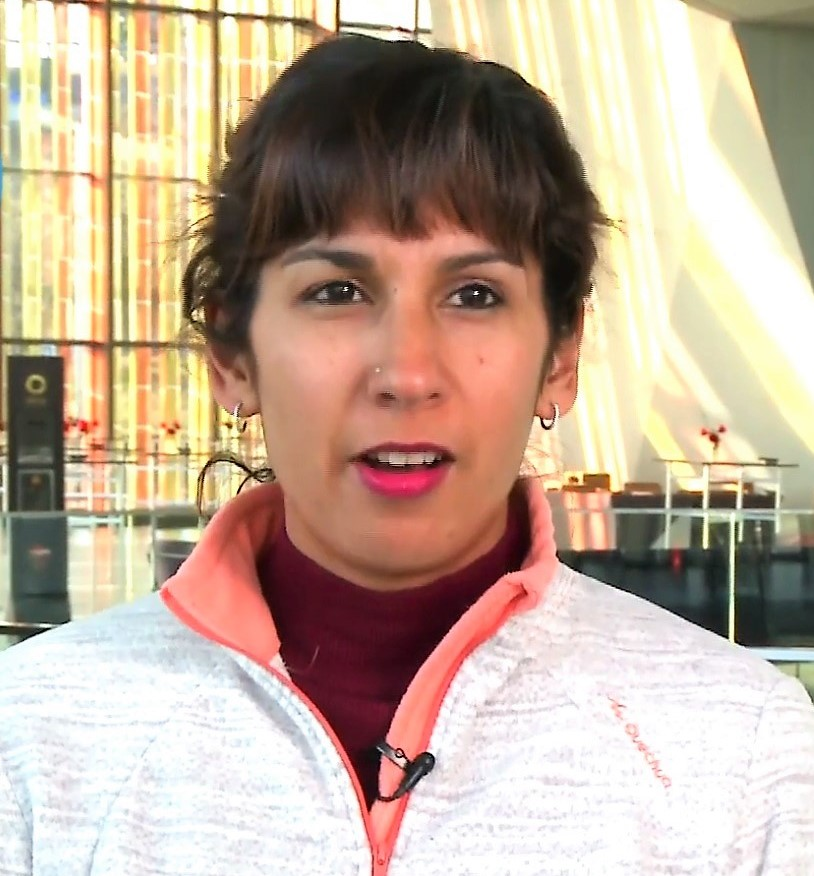
- Joshi interviewed by the International Telecommunication Union in 2019
- Education: University College London (MBBS)
- Scientific career
- Workplaces: National Health Service; NHSX

Indra Joshi is a British physician who is Director of Artificial Intelligence for NHSX and a founding ambassador of One HealthTech. She supports NHSx with digital health initiatives in the National Health Service in England. During the COVID-19 pandemic Joshi was appointed to the Scientific Advisory Group for Emergencies (SAGE).

== Early life and education ==
Joshi studied medicine at University College London. She started but did not complete specialist training in emergency medicine and spent ten years working in a range of clinical and non-clinical roles in the NHS.

== Research and career ==
Joshi was appointed clinical advisor to Digital Urgent and Emergency Care in the National Health Service (NHS) in England in 2016. As part of the creation of NHSX her role moved into NHSX in 2019, first as clinical lead in Empower the Person and then as Head of Digital Health and then as Director of Artificial Intelligence. Joshi is leading the formation of the NHS Artificial Intelligence (AI) Lab.

She worked for the CDO on the NHS England Empower the Person programme, which looks to provide digital tools and information that will empower patients. The portfolio of programmes delivered the NHS App amongst other products and services. NHS Digital worked to ensure that people on NHS sites have access to free Wi-Fi, as well as improving the NHS website, Joshi worked in the wider team. Throughout her time at the NHS, Joshi emphasised that whilst access to patient data can improve their care, patients must be involved at every stage of the data collection and sharing process. She has spoken about the ways that racial and gender bias can be built into computer programmes, and has worked to ensure that the NHS will “tackle this with its code of conduct for ‘data-driven technology’”. Joshi and a wider team from across all the Arm's Length Bodies worked with the National Institute for Health and Care Excellence (NICE), Public Health England (PHE) and MedCity to develop transparent and fair technologies related to healthcare. She publishes updates on the NHS digital activity on gov.uk.

In 2018 she was selected as one of the top 30 Women Leaders in Healthcare by PM Live. She published Artificial Intelligence: How to get it right. Putting policy into practice for safe data-driven innovation in health and care in 2018, which addresses how AI will be used ethically to benefit patients in the NHS. The report outlined how any advances in technology should be used to reduce the burdens on clinical staff, improve patient safety, improve NHS productivity and improve clinician access to medical records.

During the COVID-19 pandemic, Joshi was tasked by the government to create a responsive platform that could provide hospitals with up-to-date, secure and reliable data. In early May 2020 she was appointed to the Scientific Advisory Group for Emergencies (SAGE), who advised the government on best practice throughout the pandemic.

Joshi was recruited by Palantir Technologies in 2022.

=== Professional service ===
In 2016 Joshi joined OneHealth Tech, a community that looks to promote marginalised groups in health innovation. She serves as Vice Chair of the British Computer Society.
