= Maria Zambon =

British virologist

Maria Caterina Zambon is a British virologist, director of reference microbiology for Public Health England and a professor. Her main research areas include influenza vaccination and influenza hemagglutination inhibition.

== Life and work ==
In 1984, Zambon earned a PhD from the University of London (Imperial College) with a thesis titled "Inhibition of influenza virus replication by 1-aminoadamantane". This work on "the mechanism of action of amantadine ... led directly to the identification of a novel class of viral proteins, viral ion channels (M2 protein)", research in which she participated further in the following years.

She leads her own research group devoted to respiratory virus diagnosis, surveillance and integrated clinical research programmes, with particular emphasis on influenza and other respiratory viruses. She also coordinates several multinational European Union projects devoted to influenza vaccines and antivirals. Primarily, her research concentrates on the diagnoses of viral infections in humans, with particular attention on "RNA viruses, the pathogenicity of influenza and development of new vaccines for respiratory viruses, particularly influenza". In addition, she has been instrumental in the development of vaccines for avian influenza and took part of a successful UK consortium that conducted clinical trials of the H5, H7 and H9 vaccines.

Zambon is one of the 23 attendees of the Scientific Advisory Group for Emergencies (Sage). She was a member of the Coronaviridae Study Group of the International Committee on Taxonomy of Viruses and contributed to the scientific description of MERS-CoV's taxonomy.

Maria Zambon and her colleague Joanna Ellis contributed to the development of the first real-time RT-PCR test for SARS-CoV-2, which was led by Christian Drosten.

== Honors ==
In 2011, she was elected a fellow of the Academy of Medical Sciences. She is a fellow of the Royal College of Pathologists.
