= Ben Warner =

British data scientist

- Education: University College London (PhD)
- Known for: Scientific Advisory Group for Emergencies
- Scientific career
- Fields: Data science
- Workplaces: ASI Data Science; University College London; Vote Leave
- Thesis: Engineering the properties of magnetic molecules through the interaction with the surface (2014)
- Doctoral advisor: Cyrus Hirjibehedin

Ben Warner is a British data scientist.

== Education ==
Warner earned a PhD at University College London for research investigating single molecule spintronics. The research was supervised by Cyrus Hirjibehedin and was awarded the Marshall Stoneham prize.

== Career ==
Warner was a postdoctoral research fellow in quantum physics at the centre for nanotechnology at University College London. He left to join ASI Data Science (now Faculty), a company founded by his brother Marc Warner in 2014, where he is now a commercial principal.

Warner was a key figure in the computer modelling used by Vote Leave's successful 2016 referendum campaign. He was brought in by Dominic Cummings to run the Conservative Party's private computer model for the 2019 general election, which predicted that the Conservative Party would win 364 seats (they won 365).

Warner was a member of the Scientific Advisory Group for Emergencies (SAGE) during the COVID-19 pandemic, with Cummings and 21 others.
