= Gabor Medal =

Medal awarded by the Royal Society

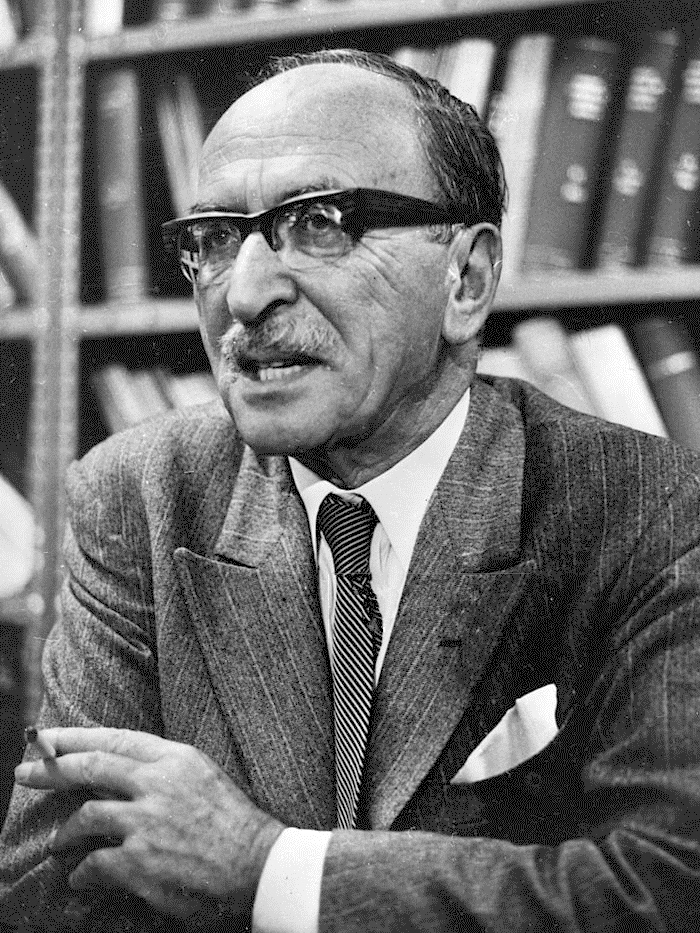
Dennis Gabor (pictured in 1971)

The Gabor Medal is one of the medals awarded by the Royal Society for "acknowledged distinction of interdisciplinary work between the life sciences with other disciplines".

The medal was created in 1989 to honor the memory of physicist Dennis Gabor, and was originally awarded biennially. Initially awarded "for acknowledged distinction of work in the life sciences, particularly in the fields of genetic engineering and molecular biology", the criteria for the awarding of the medal were later changed to its current definition. It is made of silver. The medal is targeted at "emerging early to mid career stage scientist[s]" and is accompanied by a £2000 prize since 2017. Before that, it accompanied with a prize of £1000. From 2017 it has been awarded annually. All citizens who have been residents of either United Kingdom, Commonwealth of Nations, or the Republic of Ireland for more than three years are eligible for the medal.

The Gabor Medal was first awarded in 1989 to Noreen Murray for her pioneering work in genetic engineering. As of September 2026, the latest recipient of the Gabor Medal is Sarah Teichmann.

== List of recipients ==
List of recipients of the Gabor Medal
Year	Portrait	Name	Citation	Ref.
1989	Black-and-white photographic portrait of Noreen Murray	Noreen Murray	"in recognition of her pioneering work in the field of genetic engineering, in particular for her development of the bacteriophage lambda system as a cloning vector for the expression of foreign proteins in E. coli"	
1991	Photographic portrait of Alan Fersht	Alan Fersht	"in recognition of his pioneering work in the use of protein engineering to study protein structure and enzyme function"	
1993	Photographic portrait of Charles Weissmann	Charles Weissmann	"in recognition of his many contributions to molecular biology, including his innovative analysis of coliphage Q-beta by the introduction of methods for making site-specific mutations, and the cloning and expression of alpha-interferon genes in bacteria"	
1995	—	David Hopwood	"in recognition of his pioneering and leading the growing field of the genetics of Streptomyces, and for developing the programming of the pervasive process of polyketide synthesis"	
1997	—	Kenneth Holmes	"in recognition of his achievements in molecular biology, in particular his pioneering analyses of biological structures and viruses, and his development of the use of synchrotron radiation for X-ray diffraction experiments, now a widely used technique not only in molecular biology but in physics and materials science"	
1999	Photographic portrait of Adrian Peter Bird	Adrian Peter Bird	"in recognition of his pioneering work in the study of global mechanisms by which transcription of the mammalian genome is regulated and for his exploration into the molecular basis of fundamental biological mechanisms, particularly his development of ways of analysing methylation patterns of eukaryotic DNA using endonucleases and the discovery of and continued research into a new class of DNA sequences found in all vertebrates"	
2001	—	Azim Surani	"in recognition of his discovery of mammalian genomic imprinting, revealing the expression of certain autosomal genes according to the parent of origin. Genomic imprinting has major implications for human genetics and the inheritance patterns of human disease and its discovery has been a major fundamental breakthrough that has changed the way we think about genetics in mammals"	
2003	—	Jean Beggs	"for her contributions to the isolation and manipulation of recombinant DNA molecules in a eukaryotic organism, adding a new dimension to molecular and cellular biology"	
2005	—	Lionel Crawford	"in recognition for his work on the small DNA tumour viruses, specifically the papova virus group, papilloma, polyoma and SV40"	
2007	Photographic portrait of Richard J. Roberts	Richard J. Roberts	"for his internationally acclaimed contributions to the discovery of RNA splicing and his structural and genetic studies that have extended the range of sequence specificity of restriction and modification of enzymes"	
2009	—	Gregory Challis	"for his highly interdisciplinary work, exploiting genomics of Streptomyces coelicolor to identify new natural products and biosynthetic enzymes"	
2010	Photographic portrait of Gideon Davies	Gideon Davies	"for his highly interdisciplinary work into the three-dimensional structures and reaction coordinates of enzymes, which has transformed glycobiochemistry"	
2011	Photographic portrait of Angela McLean	Angela McLean	"for her pivotal work on the mathematical population biology of immunity"	
2013	Photographic portrait of Christofer Toumazou	Christofer Toumazou	"for his success in applying semiconductor technology to biomedical and life-science applications, most recently to DNA analysis"	
2015	—	Benjamin Simons	"for his work analysing stem cell lineages in development, tissue homeostasis and cancer"	
2017	Photographic portrait of Richard M. Durbin	Richard M. Durbin	"for his outstanding contributions to computational biology, and their impact across many areas of the life sciences"	
2018	—	Cait MacPhee	"for her seminal contributions to understanding protein aggregation that informed our approach to diseases such as Alzheimer's and diabetes, and opened up new opportunities for creating self-assembled functional biopolymers"	
2019	Photographic portrait of Alison Noble	Alison Noble	"for developing solutions to a number of key problems in biomedical image analysis and substantially advancing automatic extraction of clinically useful information from medical ultrasound scans"	
2020	—	David Ian Stuart	"for his seminal contributions to understanding virus structure and application to vaccine design, as well as driving the application of engineering and physical science to the life sciences"	
2021	—	Peter Donnelly	"for pioneering work in the genomic revolution in human disease research, transforming the understanding of meiotic recombination, and for developing new statistical methods"	
2022	—	Graham Medley	"for leading an interdisciplinary team of biologists, clinicians, mathematicians and statisticians who provided SAGE with epidemiological modelling expertise concerning the COVID-19 pandemic"	
2023	—	Catherine Noakes	"for her pioneering contributions to infection risk modelling and her exceptional leadership in the field through groundbreaking research and a multidisciplinary approach"	
2024	—	Emily Rayfield	"for her pioneering a new, cross-disciplinary era of engineering-informed computational palaeobiology"	
2025	—	Pearse Keane	"for pioneering, developing and facilitating retinal image analysis using artificial intelligence for diagnosis of ocular and systemic disorders"	
2026	—	Sarah Teichmann	"for fundamental contributions to deciphering the molecular and cellular basis of living systems by combining biophysics, genomics and data science"	

== See also ==
- Awards, lectures and medals of the Royal Society
