= Deborah Dunn-Walters =

British immunologist and academic

- Born: 1963 (age 62–63)
- Education: University of Surrey
- Scientific career
- Workplaces: University of Surrey; King's College London
- Thesis: Studies on the human glutathione peroxidase gene and related DNA sequences (1990)

Deborah Kay Dunn-Walters FRSB FMedSci (born September 1963) is a British immunologist who is Professor of Immunology and Associate Dean for Research and Innovation at the University of Surrey. Her research considers B-cell development in healthy ageing and in disease, particularly from the viewpoint of antibody repertoires. During the COVID-19 pandemic, Dunn-Walters focussed on mapping responses to SARS-CoV-2 infection and the development of single cell analyses of the immunological responses to a COVID-19 vaccine. She was a member of the Scientific Advisory Group for Emergencies, and provided the government with scientific advice during the pandemic.

== Early life and education ==
Dunn-Walters was born in Shipley, West Riding of Yorkshire and grew up in Cottingley, Bradford. Dunn-Walters worked toward her doctorate at the University of Surrey. Her doctoral research considered the glutathione peroxidase gene. After a brief period working with the Imperial Cancer Research Fund on breast cancer she moved into the study of Immunology. She has worked at University College London, King's College London and University of Surrey.

== Research and career ==
Dunn-Walters has over a hundred primary research publications. She studies B cell development in disease, and how the immune system changes during ageing. She has developed new characterisation techniques to understand immune responses, including single-cell and repertoire approaches. She discovered IgM memory B cells in the spleen, that the older immune system has a less diverse repertoire of B cells, that there are at least 10 different types of B cells, that different types of B cells may have different repertoires and therefore be responding to different stimuli. She works in collaboration with computer scientists and together they have produced online tools for repertoire analysis. More recently, the development of new tools for distinguishing between productive and sterile transcripts of Ig constant region genes in B cells has shown that B cells become primed for Immunoglobulin class switching in a stage before they actually switch. She is part of the CARINA (Catalyst Reducing Immune Ageing) Network, a collective which looks to understand how ageing impacts the immune system and vice versa.

Dunn-Walters has served on grants awarding and strategy committees for funding bodies such as the UK Research and Innovation (UKRI) MRC and BBSRC, Research Council of Norway, Fondazione Cariplo Italy. She is a member of the British Society for Research on Ageing where she has previously served on the board and as Programme Secretary. She is also a member and elected Trustee for the British Society for Immunology where she chairs their Immunology Taskforce. She also serves as Chair Trustee for the Vivensa Foundation.

Dunn-Walters is currently the Associate Dean for Research and Innovation, Faculty of Health and Medical Sciences at the University of Surrey.

During the COVID-19 pandemic, Dunn-Walters served as a scientific advisor to the Government of the United Kingdom. She was a member of the Scientific Advisory Group for Emergencies (SAGE), and Chair of the British Society for Immunology COVID-19 Taskforce. Dunn-Walters recommended all who were able to have the COVID-19 vaccine.

She was elected a Fellow of the Academy of Medical Sciences in 2025.

== Selected publications ==
- Alexander Stewart; Joseph Chi-Fung Ng; Gillian Wallis; Vasiliki Tsioligka; Franca Fraternali; Deborah K Dunn-Walters (18 March 2021). "Single-Cell Transcriptomic Analyses Define Distinct Peripheral B Cell Subsets and Discrete Development Pathways". Frontiers in Immunology. 12 602539. doi:10.3389/FIMMU.2021.602539. ISSN 1664-3224. PMC 8012727. PMID 33815362.
- Alexander Stewart; Emma Sinclair; Joseph Chi-Fung Ng; et al. (3 May 2022). "Pandemic, Epidemic, Endemic: B Cell Repertoire Analysis Reveals Unique Anti-Viral Responses to SARS-CoV-2, Ebola and Respiratory Syncytial Virus". Frontiers in Immunology. 13 807104. doi:10.3389/FIMMU.2022.807104. ISSN 1664-3224. PMC 9111746. PMID 35592326.
- Kate L Gibson; Yu-Chang Wu; Yvonne Barnett; et al. (5 November 2008). "B-cell diversity decreases in old age and is correlated with poor health status". Aging Cell. 8 (1): 18–25. doi:10.1111/J.1474-9726.2008.00443.X. ISSN 1474-9718. PMC 2667647. PMID 18986373.
- Yu-Chang Wu; David Kipling; Hui Sun Leong; Victoria Martin; Alexander A Ademokun; Deborah K Dunn-Walters (10 May 2010). "High-throughput immunoglobulin repertoire analysis distinguishes between human IgM memory and switched memory B-cell populations". Blood. 116 (7): 1070–1078. doi:10.1182/BLOOD-2010-03-275859. ISSN 0006-4971. PMC 2938129. PMID 20457872.
- D. K. Dunn-Walters; P. G. Isaacson; J. Spencer (1 August 1995). "Analysis of mutations in immunoglobulin heavy chain variable region genes of microdissected marginal zone (MGZ) B cells suggests that the MGZ of human spleen is a reservoir of memory B cells" (PDF). Journal of Experimental Medicine. 182 (2): 559–566. doi:10.1084/JEM.182.2.559. ISSN 0022-1007. PMC 2192131. PMID 7629512.
