= Council for Science and Technology =

Advisory non-departmental public body of the United Kingdom government

Non-departmental public body overview
- Formed: 1993; 33 years ago
- Preceding Non-departmental public body: Advisory Council on Science and Technology
- Jurisdiction: United Kingdom
- Status: Active
- Headquarters: London, England
- Non-departmental public body executives: Lord Browne of Madingley, Independent Co-Chair; Dame Angela McLean, Government Chief Scientific Adviser Co-Chair
- Website: www.gov.uk/government/organisations/council-for-science-and-technology

The Council for Science and Technology (CST) is an advisory non-departmental public body of the United Kingdom government. Its role is to give advice on issues that cut across government departments to the Prime Minister. It was established in 1993 and reconstituted in 2003. It is based in London.

== Evolution ==
From the 1970s, reforms to government science support drew funding back into departments which had new chief scientists and reduced the role of the Government Chief Scientific Adviser (GCSA). In order to direct this, a central committee was formed to set priorities for applied research in parallel to the advisory board for the research councils (ABRC) which advised on basic research. The advisory functions now in the CST were performed by the Advisory Council for Applied Research and Development (ACARD), from 1976 to 1987, and the Advisory Council on Science and Technology (ACOST) from 1987 to 1993 which included defence as well as civil research.

The CST was formed in 1993 to advise the prime minister, bringing departmental chief scientists into the council and absorbing the ABRC into government. The aim of the CST was set out in a white paper on science policy which recognised the role of government in funding major investments, and working internationally on the largest projects. But it also saw science as driving innovation and economic growth in a partnership with industry, which funded at least half of science. The CST was expected to integrate expertise with the new technology foresight work of the Office of Science and Technology and advise on the balance of government research.

Periodic reviews have been conducted since the CST was formed, most significantly in 2003. The Royal Society responded to the call for evidence to suggest adopting the independent co-chair model used in the USA. Although the review itself specified two options, an independent chair or the GCSA chairing, the government response chose the co-chair model used today. The 2003 review also saw a change to include wider societal expertise, covering economics, health, and ethics which could better identify policy implications and the extent of the impact of innovation.

== Membership ==
The Council has 19 independent members appointed by the Prime Minister, including the presidents of the four UK-wide national academies (ex-officio), and other independent experts across a broad range of expertise in science, technology, engineering and innovation.

PM advice meeting of CST in 2022

The Council is headed by two co-chairs, an independent Co-Chair Lord Browne of Madingley who chairs meetings where advice is being developed, and Dame Angela McLean, the Government Chief Scientific Adviser and head of the Government Office for Science, who chairs meetings reporting its advice to government. Previous independent co-chairs include Dame Nancy Rothwell and Dame Janet Finch.

Scotland has its own Scottish Science Advisory Council, so despite an intention to include devolved representation and provide advice across the UK, to the First Minister of Scotland and the First Minister for Wales, the CST now advises the prime minister only.

== Advice ==
Advice is frequently published in the form of letters to the prime minister, including a series of recommendations, but also in reports or meetings. Examples include the recommendation to found the Alan Turing Institute as a national centre for data science research in their 2013 letter 'the age of algorithms' and the 2014 recommendation to establish a regulatory sandbox at the FCA to support FinTech innovation.

As well as advice on the prospects of specific innovation, CST makes reports about the structure and strategy for the applied science ecosystem, and the approach to science advice for policy. For example, the report on dialogue with the public in 2005 recommended that dialogue inform policy

by challenging the thinking of policymakers and scientists who contribute to policy making, as well as that of the public stakeholders and special interest groups.

Government responded that this would be embedded, and made a commitment to learn from experiences, as recommended.

In 2024 CST made a joint statement on shared science and technology priorities with its US counterpart, the President's Council of Advisors on Science and Technology.
