= Julia Gog =

British mathematician

Julia Gog OBE
- Born: Julia Rose Gog
- Education: University of Cambridge (MA, PhD)
- Awards: Royal Society University Research Fellowship (2004); Whitehead Prize (2017); Rosalind Franklin Award (2020)
- Scientific career
- Fields: Mathematical biology
- Workplaces: University of Cambridge
- Thesis: The dynamics of multiple strains of an infectious disease (2003)
- Website: www.damtp.cam.ac.uk/person/jrg20

Julia Rose Gog OBE is a British mathematician and professor of mathematical biology in the faculty of mathematics at the University of Cambridge. She is also a David N. Moore fellow, director of studies in mathematics at Queens' College, Cambridge and a member of both the Cambridge immunology network and the infectious diseases interdisciplinary research centre.

== Education ==
Gog read mathematics in Trinity College, Cambridge where she was awarded a Master of Arts degree in 2001. She became a research fellow in Queens' College, Cambridge, and completed a PhD in 2003.

== Career and research ==
Gog is a specialist in mathematical and theoretical biology and the study of infectious diseases, particularly influenza and coronavirus disease 2019. In 2020, she served on the Scientific Advisory Group for Emergencies (SAGE) advising the government of the United Kingdom on its response to the COVID-19 pandemic.

Gog's paper The influenza virus: it's all in the packaging was included in the book 50 Visions of Mathematics, published to celebrate the 50th anniversary of the Institute of Mathematics and its Applications (IMA), a book "designed to showcase the beauty of mathematics ... without frying your brain".

Her research has been funded by the Medical Research Council (MRC), Biotechnology and Biological Sciences Research Council (BBSRC) and Engineering and Physical Sciences Research Council (EPSRC).

=== Awards and honours ===
In 2015 Gog was awarded Pilkington Prize for excellence in teaching by the University of Cambridge, and in 2016 she was involved in the National Young Mathematicians' Awards, a project in which 490 schools competed. She was awarded the Whitehead Prize in 2017 by the London Mathematical Society, and the Rosalind Franklin prize by the Royal Society in 2020.

Gog was awarded a Royal Society University Research Fellowship (URF) which she held from 2004 to 2012.

In 2017, Gog was one of 13 mathematicians featured in the touring photographic exhibition Women of Mathematics. It showed photographs by Noel Tovia Matoff and extracts from interviews with the women.

In 2020, Gog won the Rosalind Franklin Award. She was appointed Officer of the Order of the British Empire (OBE) in the 2020 Birthday Honours for services to academia and the COVID-19 response.
