= Lionel Crawford =

British cancer expert and virologist (1932–2024)

Lionel Crawford FRS, FRSE
- Born: Lionel Vivian Crawford; 30 April 1932
- Died: 3 August 2024 (aged 92)
- Education: Emmanuel College, Cambridge
- Awards: Gabor Medal (2005)
- Scientific career
- Fields: Virology, cancer research
- Workplaces: University of California, Berkeley; California Institute of Technology; Glasgow Institute of Virology; Imperial Cancer Research Fund; University of Cambridge

Lionel Vivian Crawford FRS, FRSE (30 April 1932 – 3 August 2024) was a British cancer expert and virologist.

== Life and career ==
Crawford was born on 30 April 1932. He was educated at Rendcomb College between 1941 and 1950 before being called up for National Service. After demobilization in 1952 he studied at Emmanuel College, Cambridge with a State Scholarship, graduating with a first class degree in Botany, Zoology, Organic Chemistry and Biology in 1955. After graduate work at the Cambridge Department of Chemical Microbiology he completed his PhD in 1958 in biochemistry. Until 1960 he worked as a visiting researcher at the University of California, Berkeley and the California Institute of Technology, at which point he became a researcher at the Glasgow Institute of Virology. In 1968 he became head of the Department of Virology at the Imperial Cancer Research Fund, a position he held until 1988 when he returned to the University of Cambridge to join the Pathology Department as a researcher. The same year he was elected a Fellow of the Royal Society. He was awarded the Gabor Medal of the Royal Society in 2005 "in recognition for his work on the small DNA tumour viruses, specifically the papova virus group, papilloma, polyoma and SV40". In 1979, he published the first description of the p53 protein and in the following years made essential contributions that showed the significance of this protein to tumorigenesis. Crawford died on 3 August 2024, at the age of 92.
