= Curtain coating =

Technique to control flow of a substrate

Curtain coating is a process that creates an uninterrupted curtain of fluid that falls onto a substrate. The substrate is transported on a conveyor belt or calender rolls at a regulated speed through the curtain to ensure an even coat of the die. The curtain is created by using a slit or die at the base of the holding tank, allowing the liquid to fall upon the substrate. Some polymers are melted and extruded for coating. Many manufactures will also include a catch pan to retrieve and reuse the excess fluid.

== Process ==
Curtain coating is a process in which the object or substrate to be coated is guided through a curtain of fluid located in a gap between two conveyors. The mechanism is formed by a tank of fluid from which a thin screen falls down in between the two conveyors. The thickness of the coating layer that falls upon the object is mainly determined by the speed of the conveyor and the amount of material leaving the tank (pump speed). Curtain coating is a premetered method, which means that the amount of liquid required is supplying from the tank to the screen, to be deposited on the substrate.

Curtain coating is one of the technologies used in the converting industry to modify the properties of substrates.

== Edging ==
To be certain the flow of the liquid is disrupted, an edging along both sides of the slit is required. This is to prohibit the surface tension from causing the coating to taper in; sometimes edging alone is not enough and a surfactant must be added to lower the surface tension.

== Flow rate ==
It is also important to note that each fluid has its own minimum flow rate. The minimum flow rate is the smallest amount of dye at a given moment to keep the curtain flowing continuously. The minimum flow rate is directly proportional to the surface tension while viscosity is inversely proportional.

Curtain coating is a pre-metered coating method, which means that the exact amount of coating needed to coat the substrate can be calculated before the process is actually accomplished. This can be done by using the ratio of the flow rate (with respect to volume) and width of the substrate to the speed at which the substrate passes under the "curtain" of coating fluid.

Because of the ability to calculate the exact (or nearly so) amount of fluid needed for a given project, film thickness variations on the finished product can be kept within +/− 0.5% of the target thickness .

== Benefits of curtain coating ==
- Faster coating velocity
- Ability to produce a thinner coat
- Easily coat abstract surfaces
- Lower cost of dies
- Lower waste of coating
- Coats a more uniform layer
- Can be used to coat multiple layers in one pass

== Deficits of curtain coating ==
- Minimum flow rate
- Air entrainment
- Rough surfaces are more likely to have air entrainment
- Management of airflow around the apparatus

== Geometrical possibilities ==
- Curtain coating is usually only effective on relatively flat substrates. Because of the possibility of air pockets being formed beneath the coating, it is not advisable to use curtain coating on substrates with extremely rough or angular surfaces with grooves and pits etc.

== Production rates ==
- Production rates are only limited by the maximum speed that the fluid can be laid down on the substrate without breaking the curtain or getting air bubbles between the substrate and the coating material. This is dependent mainly upon the viscosity of the coating fluid.

== See also ==
- Coating and printing processes
