= Tom Pilkington =

British academic (1921–2011)

Tom Pilkington (30 November 1921 – 8 February 2011) was a professor of medicine at St. George's Hospital, London, who specialised in metabolic medicine. His work on jejuno-ileal bypass operations contributed to the development of the surgical management of severe obesity. He was mentor to Patrick Vallance and Peter Kopelman.

== Selected publications ==
- Pilkington, T. R.; Gazet, J. C.; Ang, L.; Kalucy, R. S.; Crisp, A. H.; Day, S. (19 June 1976). "Explanations for weight loss after ileojejunal bypass in gross obesity". British Medical Journal. 1 (6024): 1504–1505. doi:10.1136/bmj.1.6024.1504. ISSN 0007-1447. PMC 1640791. PMID 1276737.
