= Lucy Yardley =

British psychologist

- Born: 2 February 1961 (age 65)
- Education: University of Southampton
- Known for: LifeGuide, Person-centred Approach
- Awards: OBE, FBPsS, FAcSS
- Scientific career
- Fields: Health Psychology, Behaviour change, digital health
- Workplaces: University of Bristol, University of Southampton
- Thesis: The experience of vertigo : a mutualist analysis

Lucy Yardley OBE CPsychol FBPsS (born 2 February 1961) is a British psychologist and professor of health psychology based at both the University of Bristol (since 2018) and University of Southampton (since 1999). She is a senior investigator at the National Institute for Health Research (NIHR) and has a continuing role at the University of Southampton as Director of the LifeGuide Research Programme, and the Behavioural Science theme of the NIHR Biomedical Research Centre.

== Early life and education ==
Yardley studied psychology for her BSc at the University of Southampton, and during her undergraduate days formed links with the local community which resulted in her decision to stay in the area to progress her further training. A desire to help people led her to the field of audiology, and she was awarded an MRC studentship to pursue an MSc in the then-emerging field of audiological science, again at the University of Southampton.

== Career ==
After completing her MSc in 1986, she worked as an audiologist at the Institute of Sound and Vibration Research and then at the Royal South Hants Hospital. Fitting hearing aids and carrying out hearing tests over a period of 18 months gave her valuable first-hand experience of practising as a healthcare professional. Yardley then took up an appointment as a research demonstrator in the Department of Psychology at the University of Southampton, which gave her the opportunity to begin a PhD at the interface of audiology and psychology. Her research involved looking at psycho-physiological aspects of vestibular function and dysfunction. During her studies, she also lectured at the Institute of Sound and Vibration Research, but subsequently was invited to take up a non-clinical research position in the MRC Human Movement and Balance Unit at the National Hospital for Neurology and Neurosurgery in London (now part of the University College London Hospitals NHS Foundation Trust) where she completed her PhD and embarked on her career as an academic psychologist, specialising in psychological aspects of vestibular (dys)function. Her first academic post was a lectureship at UCL – still commuting from her home in Southampton. She then became a senior lecturer in Psychology as Applied to Medicine at University College London, before returning to the University of Southampton as a reader and then professor of health psychology). She also held a professorship at the Nuffield Department of Primary Care and Health Sciences, University of Oxford. Yardley now divides her time between her position at the University of Southampton and as professor of health psychology in the School of Psychological Science at the University of Bristol).

Yardley has an international reputation for developing and evaluating health behaviour change and self-care interventions, with a particular focus on internet-based interventions. She specializes in using mixed and qualitative research methods. She developed the person-based approach’ to intervention development with her research group, which draws together qualitative research and user-centred design methodology to develop a deep understanding of the views and experiences of potential users and the contexts in which they live. In 2008 she was funded by the ESRC to develop ‘LifeGuide’: a piece of open software designed for developing web-based interventions. She then led the EPSRC-funded ‘UBhave’ programme to develop software for creating interventions for mobile phones, known as the ‘LifeGuide Toolbox’.

Yardley has led MSc and PhD programmes in Health Psychology, served as Head of the School of Psychology for 3 years, and supervised over 20 PhD students. Her professional roles have included editor-in chief of Psychology and Health (official journal of the European Health Psychology Society), associate editor for the British Journal of Health Psychology and consulting editor for the journals Social Theory and Health, and Health. She has also been a core member of the National Institute for Clinical Excellence (NICE) public health committee (2013 to 2016), topic expert member for other NICE committees, and a member of research funding panels for the National Institute for Health Research, the Medical Research Counsel and medical charities.

== Awards and recognition ==
She was awarded the title of Academician of the Academy of Social Sciences in 2010, and in 2018 she was elected as a Fellow of the British Psychological Society. She has numerous highly cited publications and has won major funding awards as principal investigator and co-investigator across various funding bodies (ESRC, EPSRC, NIHR, MRC, ESRC, EC, HTA, Wellcome Trust, other medical charities).

Yardley was appointed Officer of the Order of the British Empire (OBE) in the 2020 Birthday Honours for services to the Covid-19 response.
