= Nicola Steedman =

Scottish deputy medial officer

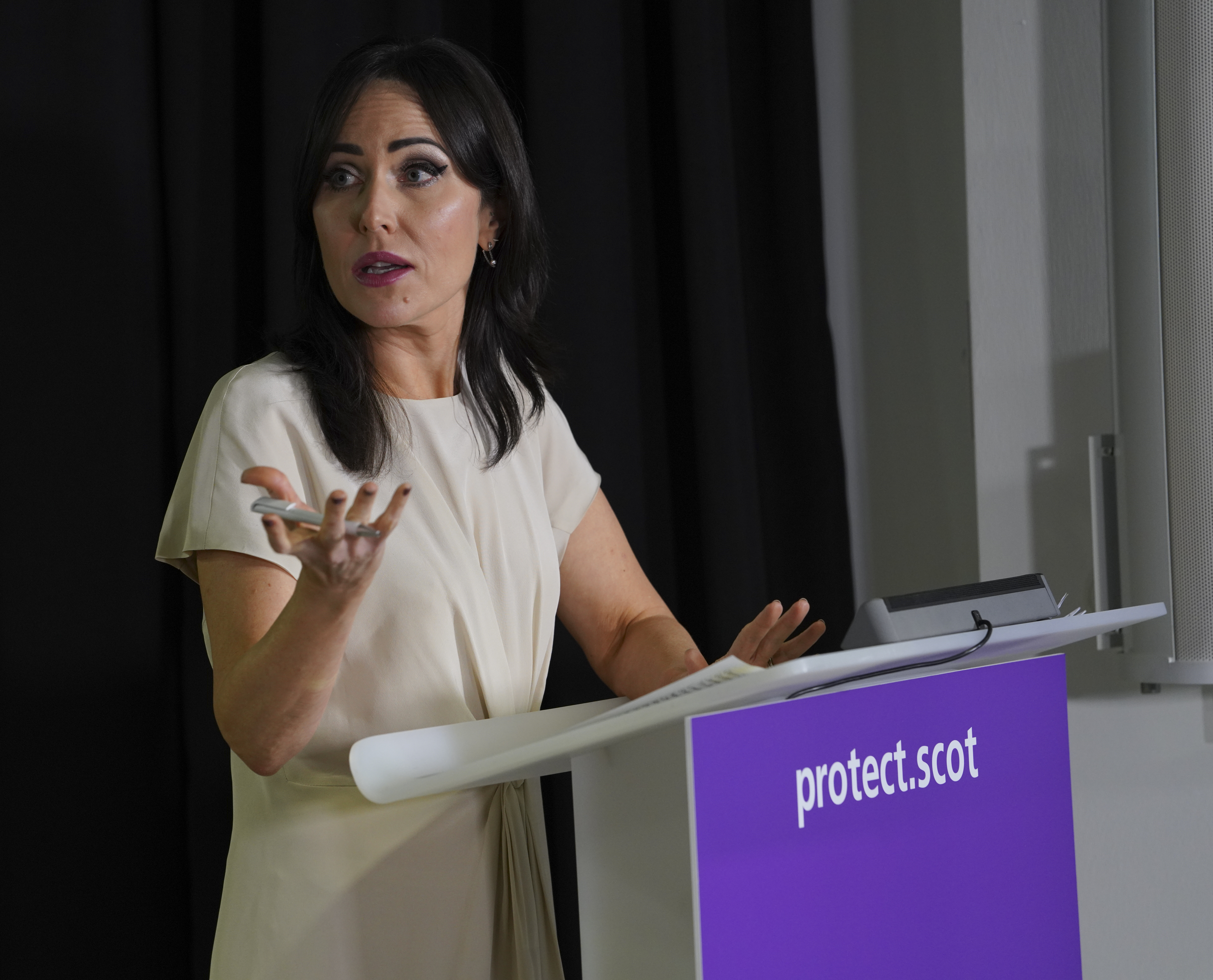
- Born: Northern Ireland
- Education: University of Cambridge; University of Oxford
- Employer: Scottish Government
- Known for: Scottish Deputy Chief Medical Officer

Professor Nicola Steedman is the Scottish Deputy Chief Medical Officer.

== Life ==
Steedman was born and brought up in Northern Ireland, and educated in Belfast at St Dominic's Grammar School for Girls. She studied at Cambridge and Oxford Universities, doing her medical training in Oxford.

In 2012 she returned to Scotland to work for the Scottish Government as Senior Medical Officer. She calls Scotland her "spiritual home" and she returned after four years working as a consultant in Sexual Health and HIV at Chester and as an honorary lecturer at the University of Liverpool.

In 2017 she first began to work for National Services Scotland (NSS) part time in the Information Services Division where she worked as the National Clinical Lead for Maternity and Reproductive Health Data.

In June 2019 she started work again for NSS as medical director for Procurement, Commissioning and Facilities.

Near the start of the COVID-19 pandemic in Scotland she was asked to return again as the Deputy Chief Medical Officer. The vacancy appeared suddenly as Gregor Smith stepped from the Deputy position to be the acting Chief Medical Officer after Catherine Calderwood had resigned after breaking lockdown rules. Steedman was brought in by Jeane Freeman to take over the Deputy role.

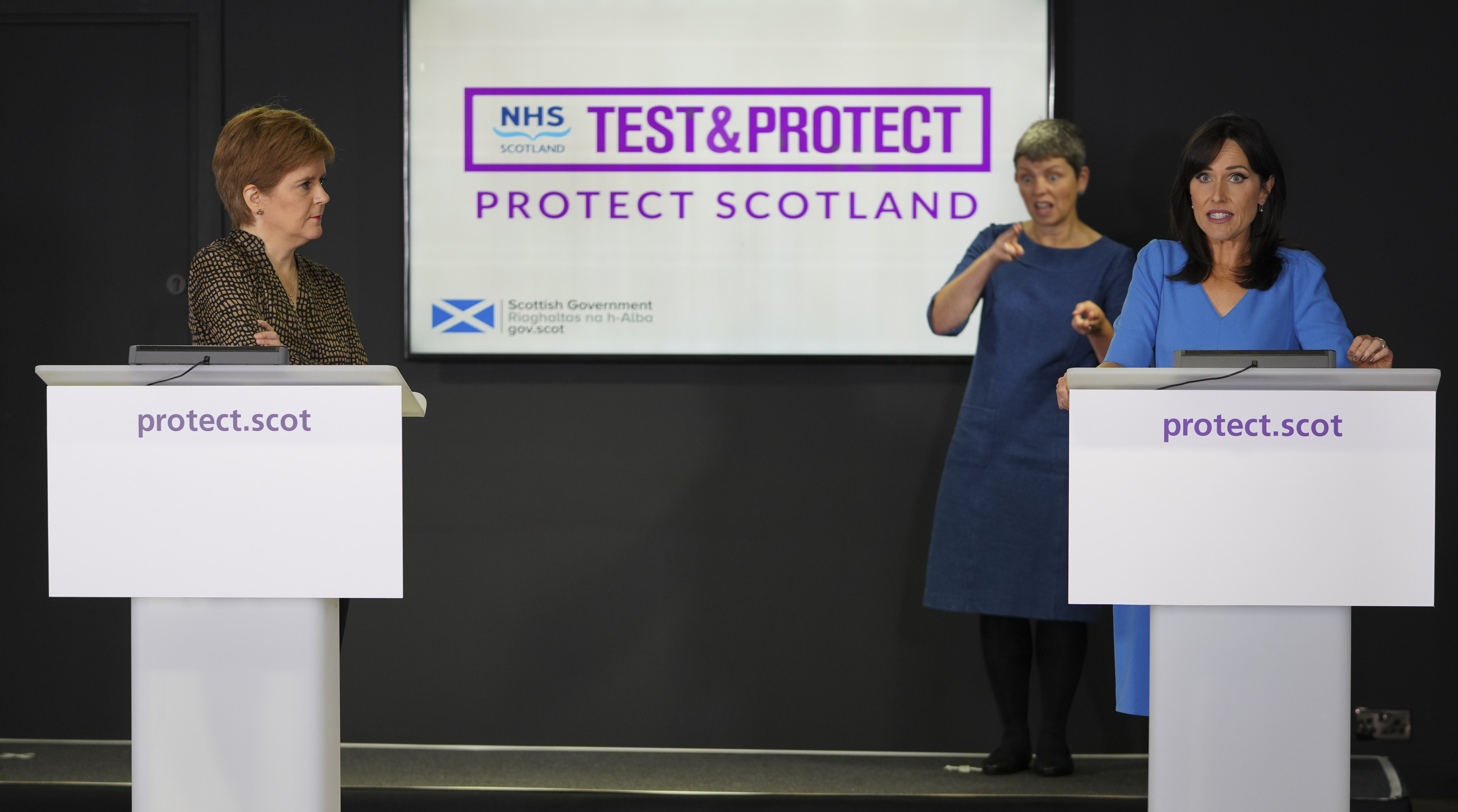
First Minister Nicola Sturgeon and Steedman briefing in September 2020

Gregor Smith who had been "acting" was confirmed as Scotland's Chief Medical Officer at the end of 2020.

In 2021 she was still working as Scotland's Deputy Chief Medical Officer partnering Nicola Sturgeon giving briefings on the continuing restrictions of the COVID-19 pandemic. She briefed the press on progress – in July 2021 she noted that the majority of people being admitted to hospital in Scotland with coronavirus were those who had not been vaccinated.

At the COVID-19 enquiry in 2024 it was revealed the Nicola Sturgeon's team had regularly deleted their WhatsApp messages to avoid them being found by a Freedon of Information request. Steedman had deleted her messages.

== Positions ==
Steedman is an Honorary Professor at Glasgow Caledonian University and Honorary Consultant in HIV Medicine at NHS Lothian.
