= Theresa Marteau =

British health psychologist

Dame Theresa Marteau DBE, FMedSci, FAcSS
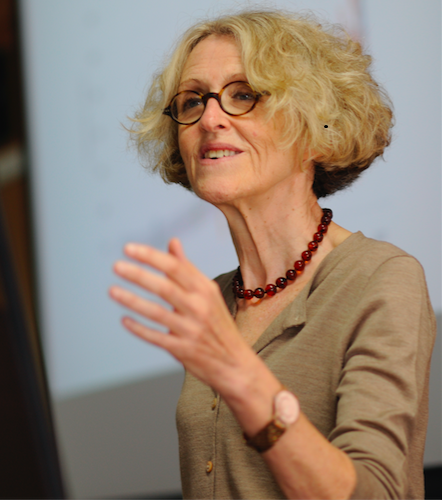
- Born: Thesea Mary Marteau; 7 March 1953 (age 73)
- Education: London School of Economics and Political Science (BSc); University of Oxford (MSc); University of London (PhD)
- Awards: DBE (2017)
- Scientific career
- Fields: Health Psychology; Behavioural Science
- Workplaces: University of Cambridge
- Thesis: Perceptions of diabetes in childhood: a study of parents and physicians
- Website: http://www.bhru.iph.cam.ac.uk/

Dame Theresa Mary Marteau, DBE, FMedSci, FAcSS (born 7 March 1953) is a British health psychologist, professor, and director of the Behaviour and Health Research Unit at the University of Cambridge, Fellow and director of studies for Psychological and Behavioural Sciences at Christ's College, Cambridge.

== Education ==
Marteau was educated at St Michael's Convent Grammar School, the London School of Economics and Political Science and Wolfson College, Oxford. She graduated with a bachelor's degree in social psychology, a master's in abnormal (clinical) psychology and a PhD in health psychology.

== Career and research ==
Her first academic post was as a lecturer in health psychology at the Royal Free Hospital School of Medicine in 1986, followed by a senior lectureship in 1993 then professorship at King's College, London She left in 2010 to take up her current post at the University of Cambridge.

Marteau's research focused initially on the behavioural impact of communicating personalised risk information about preventable diseases for risks that could be reduced were recipients to change their behaviour. The null findings led her to switch her research focus to developing and evaluating interventions that target non-conscious as opposed to the conscious processes targeted by risk information.

== Awards and honours ==
Marteau was elected a Fellow of the Academy of Medical Sciences, and a Fellow of the Academy of Social Sciences, both in 2001.

She was appointed Dame Commander of the Order of the British Empire in the 2017 Queen's Birthday Honours List. Her citation reads:

Professor Theresa Marteau, Director of the Behaviour and Health Research Unit at Cambridge University, is a distinguished health psychologist who has established a world-class behaviour change unit. She has demonstrated that Government policies should look at population-level interventions as well as those that focus on individuals, putting the concept of "nudge" into practice. She has been the Principal Investigator for the Wellcome Trust Centre for the Study of Incentives in Health and pioneered research into how the environment affects people's behaviour.
