= Graham Medley =

British scientist (born 1961)

- Education: Imperial College London
- Employers: London School of Hygiene and Tropical Medicine (2015–); University of Warwick (1993–2014)
- Awards: Gabor Medal (2022)
- Website: www.lshtm.ac.uk/aboutus/people/medley.graham

Graham Francis Hassell Medley OBE (born 1961) is professor of infectious disease modelling at the London School of Hygiene & Tropical Medicine (LSHTM) and the director of the Centre for the Mathematical Modelling of Infectious Diseases there.

== Educations ==
Medley was educated at Churcher's College and the University of York.

== Career and research ==
Medley's research is centred around the transmission dynamics of infectious diseases, and he has published on this for a range of different pathogens and hosts. He has a particular interest in the application of mathematical models to the development of policy, especially the interaction of disease transmission with societal and political processes.

He is one of the 23 attendees of the Scientific Advisory Group for Emergencies (Sage), advising the United Kingdom government on the COVID-19 pandemic, and is chair of the SPI-M modelling sub-committee. He also sits on the expert group of the UK's Infected Blood Inquiry, established to investigate how infected blood (and blood products) were used in treatment, in particular since 1970.

Since 2014, he has been a member of the Science board of reviewing editors.

Medley was appointed Officer of the Order of the British Empire (OBE) in the 2020 Birthday Honours for services to the COVID-19 response.

== Selected publications ==
- Medley, Graham F.; Vassall, Anna (2017). "When an emerging disease becomes endemic". Science. 357 (6347): 156–158. Bibcode:2017Sci...357..156M. doi:10.1126/science.aam8333. PMID 28706039.
