= Melanie Davies =

British medical researcher

Professor Dame Melanie Hall DBE FRCP FRCGP FMedSci
- Born: Melanie Jane Davies; 8 July 1961 (age 64); UK

Professor Dame Melanie Jane Hall DBE FRCP FRCGP FMedSci (née Davies; born 8 July 1961) is a British physician and academic specialising in type 2 diabetes. She is Professor of Diabetes Medicine at the University of Leicester and an Honorary Consultant Diabetologist at University Hospitals of Leicester NHS Trust. Davies is co-director of the Leicester Diabetes Centre, a collaboration between the University of Leicester and University Hospitals of Leicester NHS Trust, based at Leicester General Hospital.

== Career ==
Davies’ research focuses on the causes, prevention, and self-management of type 2 diabetes, including early onset type 2 diabetes. She has contributed to clinical trials and international consensus guidelines on diabetes care.

== Roles ==
- Director, NIHR Leicester Biomedical Research Centre
- NIHR Senior Investigator Emeritus
- Co-chair, EASD/ADA Consensus Report on Type 2 Diabetes Management
- National Specialty Lead, Research Delivery Network for Diabetes, Metabolic and Endocrine

== Research and publications ==
Davies has authored numerous peer-reviewed articles on diabetes and related conditions. Her work has appeared in journals such as The Lancet, New England Journal of Medicine, and Diabetes Care.

=== Selected publications ===
- NEJM 2025 – CagriSema Trial
- Lancet 2024 – Semaglutide HFpEF
- NEJM 2021 – Semaglutide Obesity
- Diabetes Care 2018 – Consensus Report
- Lancet 2017 – Type 2 Diabetes
- Diabetologia 2012 – Sedentary Time
- BMJ 2008 - Effectiveness of the diabetes education and self management for ongoing and newly diagnosed (DESMOND) programme for people with newly diagnosed type 2 diabetes: cluster randomised controlled trial
- Clinical Science 1993 – Antioxidant Capacity

== Awards and honours ==
- Dame Commander of the Order of the British Empire (DBE) for services to global diabetes, research, policy and care management (2026 Birthday Honours)
- Commander of the Order of the British Empire (CBE) for services to diabetes research (2016)
- Fellow of the Academy of Medical Sciences (2018)
- Outstanding Achievement in Clinical Diabetes Research Award, American Diabetes Association (2025)
