= Government Office for Science =

British government agency

Office overview
- Formed: 20 July 2007
- Preceding office: Transdepartmental Science and Technology Group of Office of Science and Innovation
- Headquarters: 10 Victoria Street, London, SW1H 0NN
- Employees: 150
- Annual budget: £4.6m (2016/17)
- Office executive: Angela McLean, Government Chief Scientific Adviser
- Parent department: Department for Business, Innovation, Science and Trade (Note: The office is funded by the Department and is responsible to it on management and financial matters, however reports to the prime minister and cabinet secretary on scientific and research matters. The National Audit Office says the office can "be thought of as a Cabinet Office unit that is embedded within [the Department]".)
- Child office: Scientific Advisory Group for Emergencies
- Website: www.gov.uk/government/organisations/government-office-for-science

The Government Office for Science is a science advisory office in the UK Government. The office advises the Government on policy and decision-making based on science and long-term thinking. It has been led by Professor Dame Angela McLean, the Government Chief Scientific Adviser, since 23 February 2023.

The office is administratively part of, and funded by, the Department for Business, Innovation, Science and Trade, and reports to the prime minister and cabinet secretary. It works with the UK Research and Innovation (funding research projects) and the Council for Science and Technology (assisting with advice). It also acts as the secretariat for the Scientific Advisory Group for Emergencies, operates a future planning unit, and manages the Government Science and Engineering Profession.

Before February 2023, it was part of the now-defunct Department for Business, Energy and Industrial Strategy.

== History ==
The Office was established following the merger of the Office of Science and Innovation into the Department for Innovation, Universities and Skills, to take on responsibilities from the Transdepartmental Science and Technology Group.

== Advice and cross-government cooperation ==
The Office assists the Government Chief Scientific Adviser to provide advice to the prime minister, departments and to the cabinet.

The Office works collaboratively, using formal and informal networks, including colleagues in other departments and external experts. Together, they create and promote guidance and frameworks describing how departments can use the natural and social sciences, engineering and medicine to provide a sound evidence base for making policy. It supports and develops the Government Science and Engineering profession, through networking and cooperation.

== Futures, Foresight and Emerging Technology unit ==
In 1993, the then-Chancellor of the Duchy of Lancaster, William Waldegrave, released a white paper, Realising our Potential - A Strategy for Science, Engineering and Technology, which made clear the importance of science, engineering and innovation in the public sector, and the establishment of a future planning service to anticipate threats and opportunities. The first "phase" of Foresight began in 1994, with its first report in 1995.

The unit looks to the future, as envisaged by the original white paper, focusing on what science can tell us about how the world could develop and what effects potential interventions might have. This enables civil servants and the public sector to plan for the long term by providing a view of potential futures under a variety of scenarios.

Foresight projects address broad policy areas and issues to enable long-term resilience and policy planning, whereas Emerging Technologies (previously Horizon Scanning) conducts smaller projects across the full policy spectrum and increases the Government's capability to think about the future systematically.
