= Angela McLean (biologist) =

British Professor of Mathematical Biology

Professor Dame Angela McLean DBE FRS HonFREng
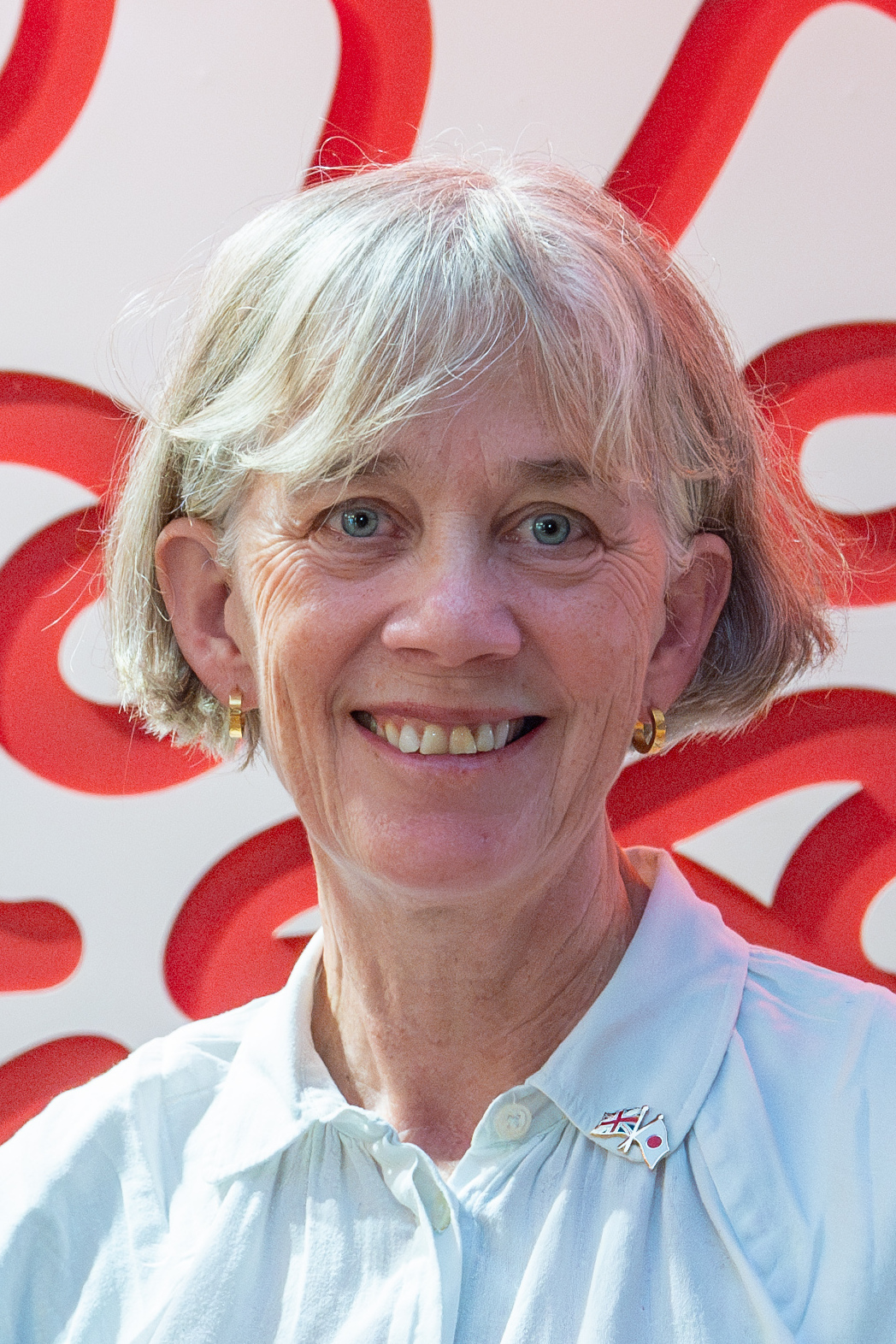
- Angela McLean in 2024
- Born: Angela Ruth Mclean; 31 May 1961 (age 65); Kingston, Jamaica
- Education: Mary Datchelor School
- Alma mater: University of Oxford (BA); Imperial College London (PhD)
- Spouse: David van Oss (m. 1986)
- Children: 3
- Awards: Royal Society University Research Fellowship (1990); Gabor Medal (2011); Weldon Memorial Prize (2018)
- Scientific career
- Fields: Mathematical biology
- Thesis: Mathematical models of the epidemiology of measles in developing countries (1987)
- Doctoral advisor: Roy M. Anderson
- Website: www.biology.ox.ac.uk/people/professor-dame-angela-mclean-frs

Dame Angela Ruth McLean (born 31 May 1961) is professor of mathematical biology in the Department of Biology, University of Oxford, and Chief Scientific Adviser to the UK Government.

== Early life and education ==
McLean was born on 31 May 1961 in Kingston, Jamaica, the daughter of Elizabeth and Andre McLean. She was educated at Mary Datchelor Girls’ School, Camberwell, London, going on to study for a Bachelor of Arts degree in mathematics at the University of Oxford where she was a student of Somerville College, Oxford. She was taught mathematical biology by Jim Murray, and graduated in 1982. In 1987, she received her PhD degree from Imperial College London with a thesis on Mathematical models of the epidemiology of measles in developing countries, supervised by Roy M. Anderson.

== Career and research ==
McLean's research interests are in the use of mathematical models to aid our understanding of the evolution and spread of infectious agents. Her research investigates how quickly infections grow inside individuals, and also how fast they spread amongst individuals.

She has worked on infectious diseases of humans such as coronavirus, human immunodeficiency virus (HIV) and measles, and on animal diseases such as foot-and-mouth, and scrapie.

In 1990, McLean won a Royal Society University Research Fellowship at the University of Oxford, and between 1994 and 1998 was seconded to the Pasteur Institute in Paris.

Between 1998 and 2000, she became head of Mathematical Biology at the Biotechnology and Biological Sciences Research Council's Institute for Animal Health.

In 2000, she was appointed as Professor of Mathematical Biology, University of Oxford and Fellow of St Catherine's College, Oxford.

Following the outbreak in 2001 of foot-and-mouth disease she served as a committee member on the independent review carried out by the Royal Society. The review, chaired by Sir Brian Follett, made recommendations from a scientific standpoint about how to prevent and combat further invasions of highly infectious livestock diseases.

She has continued to serve in an advisory capacity to the UK government, including chairing the lead expert group for a policy futures project on reducing the risk of future disasters, including disease pandemics. She was a member of the Department for Environment, Food and Rural Affairs (DEFRA) Science Advisory Council as well as the Department of Health's National Expert Panel on New and Emerging Infections.

In 2005, McLean also became director of the Institute for Emerging Infections of Humans in the James Martin 21st Century School, Oxford.

In 2008, she was elected as a senior research fellow in theoretical life sciences at All Souls College, Oxford.

In 2009, she was elected as a Fellow of the Royal Society (FRS).

From 2013, McLean was involved in the restatement or synthesis of scientific evidence on key topic areas for policy. She co-authored a number of Restatements published by the Royal Society and the Oxford Martin School. The topics included: the health effects of low-level ionising radiation; neonicotinoid insecticides and insect pollinators; the effects of endocrine disrupting chemicals on wildlife; the control of bovine tuberculosis.

In 2019, McLean was appointed as Chief Scientific Adviser to the Ministry of Defence, the first woman to be appointed to the post.

During the COVID-19 pandemic in 2020–2021, she attended meetings of the Scientific Advisory Group for Emergencies (SAGE) and was deputy to Sir Patrick Vallance, the Government Chief Scientific Adviser (GCSA). Together with Professor Graham Medley she co-chaired the SAGE sub-committee Scientific Pandemic Influenza Group on Modelling (SPI-M-O). She also contributed to some of the government's media briefings.

In 2023, the Cabinet Secretary announced that McLean had been selected by the Prime Minister as the new Government Chief Scientific Adviser after an open competition, to succeed Sir Patrick Vallance. McLean is the first woman to be appointed to this post.

=== Awards and honours ===
McLean's honours and awards include

- 1998 – elected a Fellow of the Academy of Medical Sciences (FMedSci)
- 2009 – elected a Fellow of the Royal Society (FRS)
- 2011 – Gabor Medal of the Royal Society
- 2018 – Dame Commander of the Order of the British Empire (DBE), in the 2018 Birthday Honours
- 2018 – elected a member of the Academia Europaea
- 2018 – Weldon Memorial Prize
- 2023 – elected an Honorary Fellow of the Royal Academy of Engineering.

Government offices
Preceded by Hugh F. Durrant-Whyte	Chief Scientific Adviser to the Ministry of Defence; 2019–2023	Succeeded by Vernon Gibson
Preceded by Patrick Vallance	Government Chief Scientific Adviser; 2023–	Incumbent

== Personal life ==
McLean married David van Oss in 1986. They have two daughters and one son together.
