= Yvonne Doyle (physician) =

Irish physician

Yvonne Doyle CB
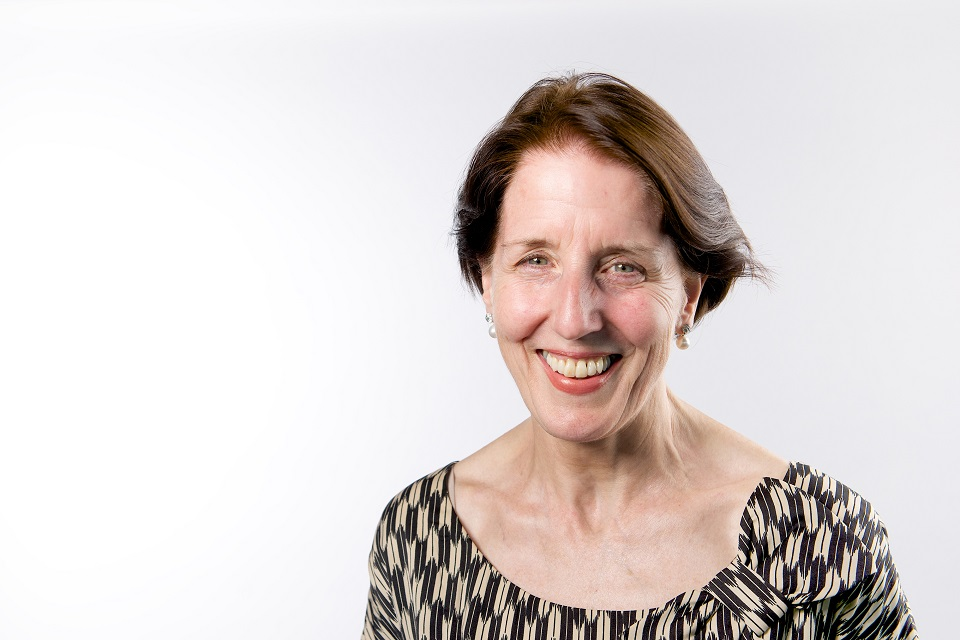
- Doyle in 2016
- Born: 29 September 1957 (age 68)
- Occupation: Physician
- Medical career
- Institutions: Public Health England
- Sub-specialties: Public health

Yvonne Doyle CB (born 29 September 1957) is an Irish physician and director of health protection for Public Health England. She was appointed a Companion of the Order of the Bath in 2016 for services to public health.

== Career ==
Doyle qualified as a doctor at University College Dublin.

She was regional director, London for PHE from 2013. In this time she provided leadership for health and reduction of inequalities at city-wide level to the population of London, and was Statutory Adviser to the Mayor of London.

She became Medical Director and Director of Health Protection for PHE in May 2019. Part of her job specification for this role was "ensuring effective planning and responses to public health emergencies throughout England."

Doyle was elected a Fellow of the Academy of Medical Sciences in 2021.

== Personal life ==
Doyle is married, with two children.
