= Climate One =

American environmentalist organization

- Established: 2007
- Founder: Greg Dalton
- Headquarters: San Francisco, California; United States
- Website: climateone.org

Climate One is a weekly podcast and radio program, aired on more than 60 public radio stations around the U.S. A special project of The Commonwealth Club of California, Climate One is based in San Francisco, California. Through its podcast, national radio show, and live convenings for thought leaders and concerned members of the public, they create opportunities for dialogue and aim to inspire a more complete understanding the implications of a changing climate on society, energy systems, economy and the natural environment. Founded in 2007 by Greg Dalton, Climate One has brought together over a thousand policymakers, business leaders, scientists, activists, and others to examine the personal and systemic impacts of climate and advance the conversation about a clean energy future.

Climate One hosts both online and in-person events, where Dalton facilitates discussions between leaders of differing — sometimes opposing — viewpoints. Speakers representing the United Nations, the fossil fuel industry, environmental advocacy groups, religious faiths, large corporations and labor unions have all appeared on Climate One to address the challenges of climate change.

== History ==
Climate One founder and Host Greg Dalton served as Vice President of Special Projects at The Commonwealth Club of California from 2001 to 2007. During this time, Dalton hosted discussions with former chief executive officer of AT&T Ed Whitacre, Grateful Dead drummer Mickey Hart, 9/11 Commissioners Slade Gorton and Richard Ben-Veniste, and others prior to founding Climate One.

In 2007, Dalton hosted a global warming symposium sponsored by The Commonwealth Club with academic experts and journalists around the Arctic Circle. Dalton was moved by the first-hand experience with the impacts of climate disruption in the region. Upon returning home, he worked with Commonwealth Club chief executive officer Gloria Duffy to launch Climate One, a special project of the Club focused on sustainability, environment, and climate.

== Speakers and programs ==
The organization hosts multiple talks throughout the year in their San Francisco office at the Commonwealth Club of California, and occasionally at other venues around the U.S. such as at Duke University or Harvard University. At each event, Greg Dalton interviews multiple guests, usually from different fields, to discuss specific aspects of climate change. An open microphone is always provided for audience questions, and post-event receptions allow for mingling and continued conversation.

Past speakers at Climate One include:

- Bill McKibben, environmentalist and co-founder of 350.org
- Varshini Prakash, director of the Sunrise Movement
- Jane Goodall, anthropologist and Founder of the Jane Goodall Institute
- Ai Wei Wei, artist and activist
- Al Gore, former Vice President
- Vandana Shiva, environmental activist
- Hillary Clinton, former Secretary of State and First Lady
- Jay Inslee, governor of Washington (state) and former U.S. presidential candidate
- Patti Poppe, chief executive officer of PG&E
- Andrew R. Wheeler, Gina McCarthy and William Reilly, former administrators of the Environmental Protection Agency
- Dan Akerson, chief executive officer of General Motors, who announced that GM would withdraw funding for the Heartland Institute.
- Julian Castro, former US Department of Housing and Urban Development Secretary
- Sylvia Earle, National Geographic explorer in residence
- Gloria Walton, president and chief executive officer of Strategic Concepts in Organizing and Policy Education (SCOPE)
- Robert Fraley, chief technology officer of Monsanto
- Dr. James E. Hansen, climate scientist
- Jane Lubchenco, former NOAA administrator
- Sally Jewell, former U.S. Secretary of the Interior
- Arnold Schwarzenegger, former California Governor
- Bill Weihl, former Facebook Director of Sustainability
- Marvin Odum, former president of Shell Oil Company

== The Stephen H. Schneider Award ==
The Stephen H. Schneider Award is Climate One's annual award recognizing a social or natural scientist for extraordinary contributions to the field, as well as their ability to communicate their findings to a broad audience. The award was created by Climate One in 2010 in memory of Stephen Henry Schneider, a respected climate scientist. The Schneider Award winner, selected by a jury of other scientists, receives a prize of $15,000.

Past Schneider Award Recipients:

- Richard Alley (2011)
- James Hansen (2012)
- Nicholas Stern (2013)
- Jane Lubchenco (2014)
- Christopher Field (2015)
- Naomi Oreskes (2016)
- Michael Mann (2017)
- Katharine Hayhoe (2018)
- Robert Bullard (2019)
- Anthony Leiserowitz and Edward Maibach (2020)
- Ayana Elizabeth Johnson (2021)
- Stefan Rahmstorf (2022)
- Ben Santer (2023)
