= John F. Marshall =

American marketing executive, professor and speaker

- Occupations: Marketing executive, CEO
- Employer: Potential Energy Coalition
- Known for: Founder and CEO of Potential Energy Coalition

John F. Marshall is an American marketing executive, professor, and speaker. He is the founder and CEO of the Potential Energy Coalition, a nonprofit organisation that develops research-based campaigns to improve climate communication. He founded the nonprofit marketing firm in 2018 and has spoken on climate-related topics at events such as TED, Aspen Ideas: Climate, and New York Climate Week.

Marshall is known for developing the concept and coining the term “Contextual Marketing,” in his 2001 article in the Harvard Business Review. According to Semantic Scholar, the article has been cited in numerous peer-reviewed studies on marketing and consumer behavior, including a 2024 Journal of Management Information Systems article titled “Tailoring Technology for Heterogeneous Shoppers: Implications for e-Retail Channel Competition.”

He graduated with a BA in Chemistry from Princeton University. Marshall also graduated with an MBA with Distinction from the Amos Tuck School at Dartmouth College where he was a Tuck Scholar

== Career ==
Marshall served as the chief strategy and innovation officer at Lippincott, Executive Vice President and global head of strategy and analytics at the digital agency Digitas, president of the public education company The Princeton Review and partner with the consulting firms Oliver Wyman and The Bridgespan Group. Marshall was a professor at the Tuck School of Business at Dartmouth College for 19 years, where he taught the impact of technology on marketing.

Marshall’s founded his current firm Potential Energy Coalition, a nonprofit that conducts research and campaigns on climate communication.

He was named to Grist’s 2024 “Grist 50” list, which highlights individuals working on innovative approaches to addressing climate change.

Marshall is also on the Board of Trustees for Rare, a global nonprofit environmental organization, and was formerly on the board of First Street Foundation.

== Climate Communication and Research ==
In a 2025 New York Times opinion article, Marshall argued that climate change is already producing material impacts on households and that Americans deserve access to verified climate-risk information on home listings so they can make informed decisions to protect their financial security.

In March 2025, peer-reviewed scientific journal Global Environmental Change published an article co-authored by John Marshall and experts at Yale University, including Anthony Leiserowitz, who leads the Yale Program on Climate Change Communication. The research tested the effect of three climate messages across 23 countries and found that climate change messages have the potential to strengthen public support for climate action.

The National Observer wrote about how Marshall has promoted simplifying language around climate change when speaking to the general public, such as avoiding terms like decarbonization. Fast Company covered how Marshall has argued that statistical benchmarks, such as global temperature targets, are often ineffective in motivating broader audiences. The Washington Post quoted Marshall on how Potential Energy’s report on electric vehicles found that abstract messaging around EVs as job creators or as a path to energy independence doesn’t work as well as pointing out how EVs cut pollution and the cost of owning a car. Marshall has also been quoted in TIME on how companies should talk about climate change. The Guardian noted that Potential Energy Coalition’s Talk Like a Human guide on how to talk about climate change should be recommended reading to delegates of United Nations Conference of the Parties (COP) conference, politicians, business leaders, teachers, and journalists.

John Marshall is a co-author of That's interesting newsletter, which publishes Potential Energy Coalition’s findings on climate communication.

== Public Engagement ==
In 2021, he gave a TED Talk titled “3 strategies for effectively talking about climate change.”

In 2024, John Marshall presented at Aspen Ideas: Climate, hosted by Aspen Institute, on Potential Energy Coalition’s research on the narratives that boost public support for climate solutions.

At New York Climate Week 2025, John Marshall spoke at Axios House on how rising insurance costs could make it easier to convey the dangers of climate change to the public.

At New York Climate Week 2024, John Marshall spoke on a panel hosted by Yale Planetary Solutions, Yale Program on Climate Change Communication, Potential Energy Coalition, and the Bezos Earth Fund, to discuss research on how the public often doesn’t understand the connection between climate change and extreme weather.

In 2024, he spoke on Nuclear Energy Institute’s podcast Fissionary about how to talk about nuclear energy and the global support for nuclear power.

Marshall has spoken on multiple podcasts about how to effectively talk about climate change, such as The Climate Pod.
