= Climate Crisis Advisory Group =

Independent group of scientists which advises on climate change and biodiversity

- Abbreviation: CCAG
- Formation: June 2021; 5 years ago
- Purpose: climate change mitigation, climate change adaptation, environmentalism, climate policy
- Website: ccag.earth

The Climate Crisis Advisory Group (CCAG) is an independent group of scientists which advises on climate change and biodiversity, headed by Sir David King.

Its goal is to "provide the global public with regular analysis about efforts to tackle the global heating and biodiversity crises".

CCAG's launch statement and first report state that the Earth may have already passed several dangerous tipping points, including melting ice sheets, the slowdown of Atlantic circulation and the dieback of the Amazon rainforest, which highlight the need for speed.

== Members ==
Members of the CCAG are scientists from multiple disciplines that are all advocates for the environment. The group was formed so that every continent (besides Antarctica) was represented. All members volunteer their time to the group. Members include:

- Nerilie Abram
- Ade Adepitan - Presenter
- Dr Fatima Denton
- Dr. Christophie McGlade Director at the International Energy Agency (IEA)
- Mercedes Bustamante
- Alice Hill
- Dr. Robert W. Corell
- Dr. Arunabha Ghosh
- Sir David King - Chair
- Dr. Klaus Lackner
- Prof Mark Maslin
- Lavanya Rajamani
- Johan Rockström
- Lorraine Whitmarsh
- Prof Qi Ye
- Mariana Mazzucato
- Gustavo Luedamann
- Dr Guido Schmidt-Traub
