= Commonwealth Club of California =

US nonprofit, nonpartisan educational organization

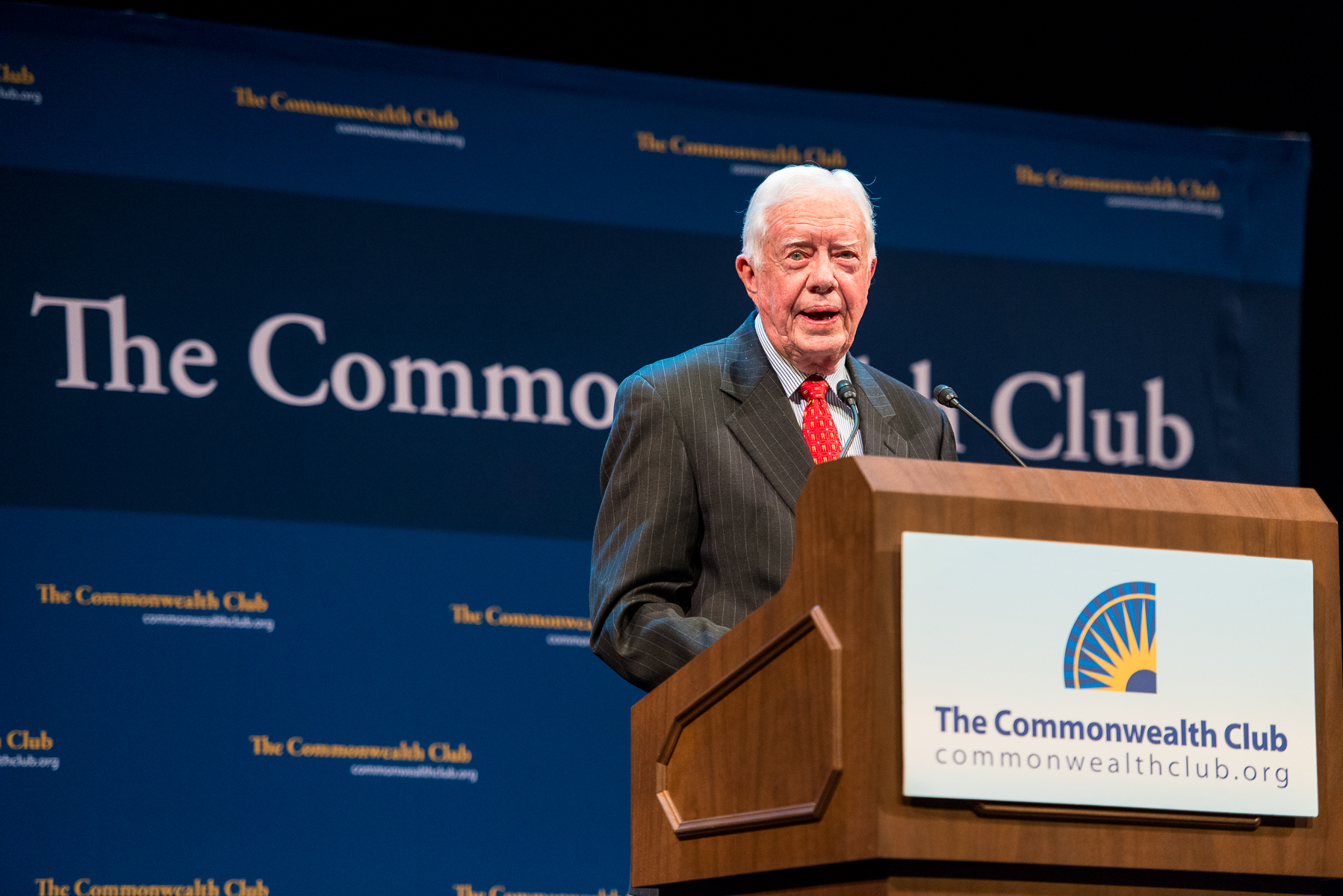
Former U.S. President Jimmy Carter speaking at the Commonwealth Club in 2013

The Commonwealth Club World Affairs of California is a non-profit, non-partisan educational organization based in Northern California. Founded in 1903, it is the oldest and largest public affairs forum in the United States. Membership is open to everyone.

In late 2023, The Commonwealth Club of California merged with World Affairs of Northern California to form The Commonwealth Club World Affairs of California. It is headquartered in the Club's existing home on the San Francisco waterfront.

== Activities ==
The Commonwealth Club World Affairs of California has over 20,000 members and organizes hundreds of programs each year on topics ranging across politics, culture, society, and the economy. Around 100,000 people attend these events in person annually. The club has 56 employees and an annual budget of $11.5 million. It is currently headed by an expert on international security and arms negotiations, former Pentagon official and businesswoman, Gloria Duffy, and attorney and foreign policy expert Philip W. Yun. Club events are broadcast on many public and commercial radio stations in the longest-lasting continuous radio program in the nation. Recordings of these programs are deposited at Stanford University's Hoover Institution Archives.

The club has radio broadcast its fora since 1924, and current broadcasts are carried weekly by about 230 public and commercial radio stations across the nation. Local residents in the Bay Area can view televised programs from The Club on KGO TV, and the club live streams or archives video of its programs on Facebook and YouTube as well as posting them on the club's website. The club's podcast is at iTunes and on the club's website and a bi-monthly magazine, The Commonwealth, is available to club members.

In addition to hosting speeches and panels, in the late 1990s the club resumed its early role initiating public policy projects. These have included Voices of Reform, a nonpartisan effort to bring together California's policy makers and opinion leaders to improve state governance. Voices of Reform became the independent organization California Forward. Similarly, the club's California Media Project merged into California Watch, part of the Center for Investigative Reporting.

The club also offers travel programs, with educational trips abroad each year to destinations such as Turkey, Southeast Asia, and Iran.

The Commonwealth Club occasionally comes under criticism from people who think it represents one or another political philosophy, and they often center upon criticism of specific speakers with whom the critics disagree. The club's more than 400 events a year feature speakers from a wide range of viewpoints—conservative and liberal and moderate and radical, religious and secular, pro-Israeli and pro-Palestinian.

== California Book Awards ==
The Commonwealth Club sponsors the California Book Awards, which were initiated in 1931 to honor "exceptional literary merit of California writers and publishers". The California Book Awards are funded by an endowment from Dr. Martha Heasley Cox, late Professor of American Literature at San Jose State University. Medals (gold and silver) and cash prizes are currently awarded in the categories of Fiction, Nonfiction, Poetry, First Work of Fiction, Californiana (fiction or nonfiction relating to California), Juvenile Literature (up to age 10), Young Adult Literature (age 11–16), and Notable Contribution to Publishing. The winning books are selected by an independent jury.

== History ==
The Commonwealth Club was founded in 1903 by Edward F. Adams, the Agricultural Editor at the San Francisco Chronicle newspaper. At its first meeting, Adams read a paper now regarded as the founding document of the club, in which he wrote "I have no fear of lack of following so long as it is self-evident that we only propose to find truth and turn it loose in the world

Four prominent California leaders—University of California president Benjamin Ide Wheeler, San Francisco Chronicle managing editor John P. Young, San Francisco Normal School (later San Francisco State University) president Frederick Burk, and William P. Lawler, a judge who later became a California Supreme Court Justice—co-founded the organization with Adams. The original name for the Club was "The Agora," which in Greek means an open place of civic assembly, but it was quickly changed to "Commonwealth Club," connoting a quest for the common good. The first president of the club was merchant, author, and public official Harris Weinstock.

Other initial club members included Bank of America founder A. P. Giannini, architect Bernard Maybeck, U.S. President Herbert Hoover, Bechtel Corporation founder W. A. Bechtel, members of the Haas family who headed Levi Strauss, Inc., U.S. Senator James Phelan, San Francisco Mayor and California Governor James "Sunny Jim" Rolph, Matson Navigation founder William P. Roth, Stanford University president and U.S. Secretary of the Interior Ray Lyman Wilbur, M.D., Bank of California/Union Bank founder William Chapman Ralston, Crown Zellerbach founder J. C. Zellerbach, department store founder Joseph Magnin, California Governor J. N. Gillette, Italian Swiss Colony winery founder Carlo Rossi, and Isaias Hellman, prominent West Coast financier and first president of Wells Fargo Bank. Their goal was cooperation on civic betterment in spite of political and ideological differences. Speakers were invited to address club members to inform them about different perspectives on important issues, after which in its early days the club membership often issued reports, statements, or recommendations on public policy issues.

Presidents of the club in the second half of the 20th century included actress and Ambassador Shirley Temple Black, California Supreme Court Justice Ming Chin, and UCSF Chancellor Julius Krevans. Club members include prominent national leaders like former Secretary of State George Shultz and former Defense Secretary William Perry, as well as citizens from professions such as business, law, medicine, teaching, the arts, technology and journalism.

The club has hosted numerous world-class speakers including many U.S. presidents and other major political leaders in the United States and abroad, business leaders, and influential social activists. Speakers receive no honoraria. The club's digital and pre-digital speeches and other records since 1903 are archived at the Hoover Library at Stanford University.

In 2002, The Commonwealth Club launched Inforum, dedicated to serving the needs of people in their 20s and 30s interested in non-partisan public affairs. In 2007, the club created Climate One to bring together academics, industry, and activists on all sides of energy and climate change issues for discussion and planning.

The club has its headquarters in San Francisco. Though the majority of its programs are in San Francisco, Silicon Valley, Marin County and Lafayette (in the East Bay area northeast of San Francisco), it also hosts occasional events in Sacramento, Southern California and Washington, D.C. A second, small office serving Silicon Valley is in Milpitas, California.

In September 2017, the club celebrated the opening of its first owned headquarters, a 24,000 square ft, $33 million building, on the San Francisco waterfront at 110 The Embarcadero. The building was designed by Leddy Maytum Stacy, a San Francisco architectural firm and winner of the American Institute of Architects 2017 Firm Award. The building is specifically designed to be a civic forum, with auditoriums, the Meyer Sound Constellation system, Copper Loop hearing technology, informal conversation areas, audio-video production facilities, digital information screens and other unique elements to serve the club's mission. It is also a historic restoration of a building that was the first headquarters of the International Longshoremen's Union. The club's HQ is environmentally sustainable, with features including cooling with outside air, paneling with wood reclaimed from the original building on the site, LED lighting and tile and carpeting with recycled content. It is also located close to public transit facilities serving the Bay Area.

== Speakers ==
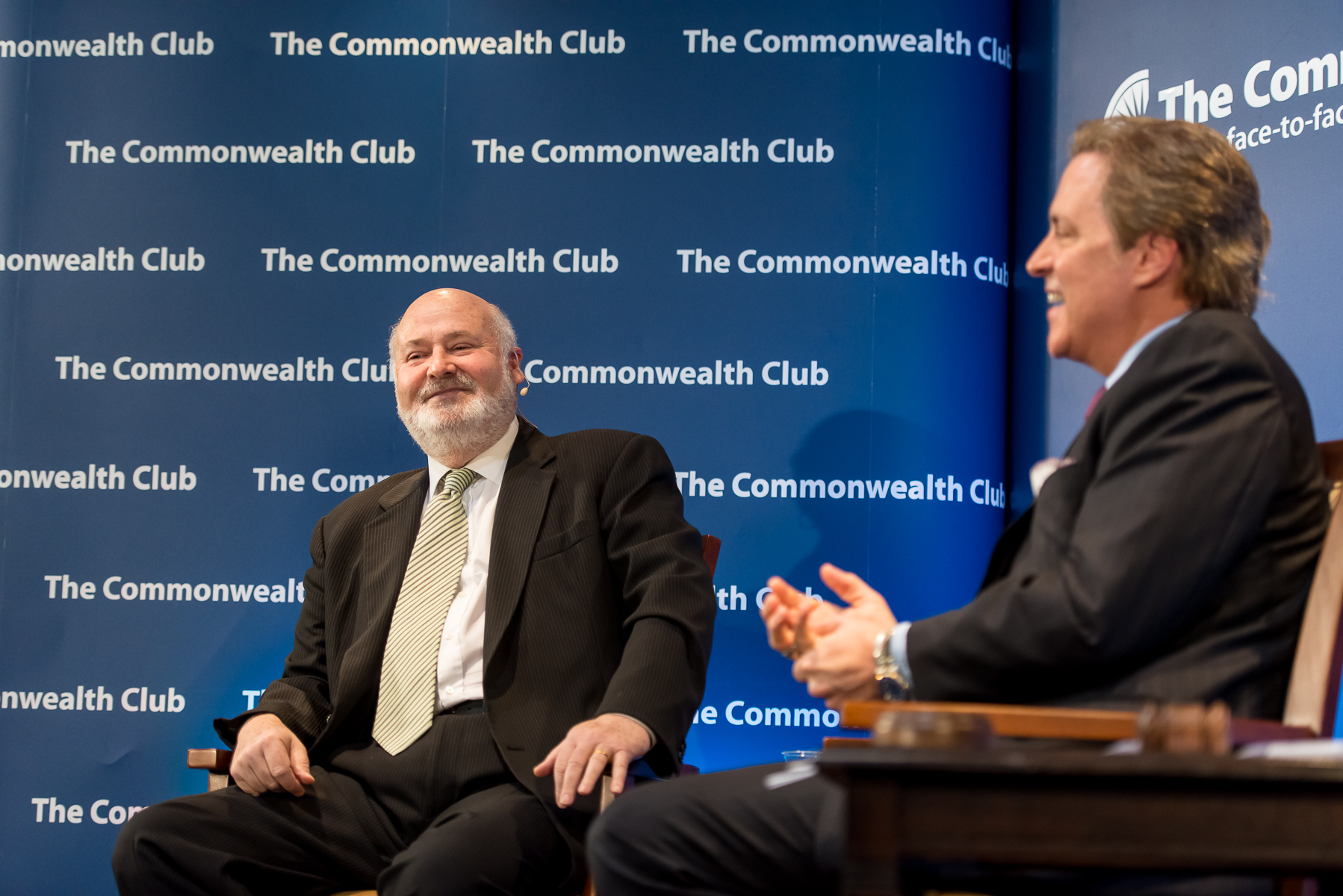
Actor/director Rob Reiner in conversation with KGO-TV anchor Dan Ashley, 2013

The list of notable speakers and speeches numbers in the thousands and includes domestic and foreign political and military leaders, Nobel prize-winning scientists, authors, activists, and artists. A book of important club speeches, Each a Mighty Voice, was published in 2004 by Heyday Books.

President Franklin Delano Roosevelt delivered his New Deal speech at the club. While in office, President Dwight D. Eisenhower spoke at the club, as did Soviet Premier Nikita Khrushchev. During his term as Vice President, Dan Quayle delivered his famous Murphy Brown speech to the group. In 2010, then-Secretary of State Hillary Clinton gave only her third public speech since taking office at the club. Other major recent speakers include former Vice President Al Gore; filmmaker Francis Ford Coppola; comedian John Cleese; former secretaries of State Condoleezza Rice, George Shultz, James Baker, and Madeleine Albright; California Governor Arnold Schwarzenegger; Federal Reserve chair Janet Yellen; authors Christopher Hitchens, Michael Crichton, Ayaan Hirsi Ali and Greg Mortenson; microcredit entrepreneur and Nobel Prize Winner Muhammad Yunus; historian Victor Davis Hanson; airline pilot Chesley Sullenberger; CIA Director Leon Panetta; former NBA star Kareem Abdul Jabbar, and business leaders Eric Schmidt, Richard Kovacevich and David O'Reilly.

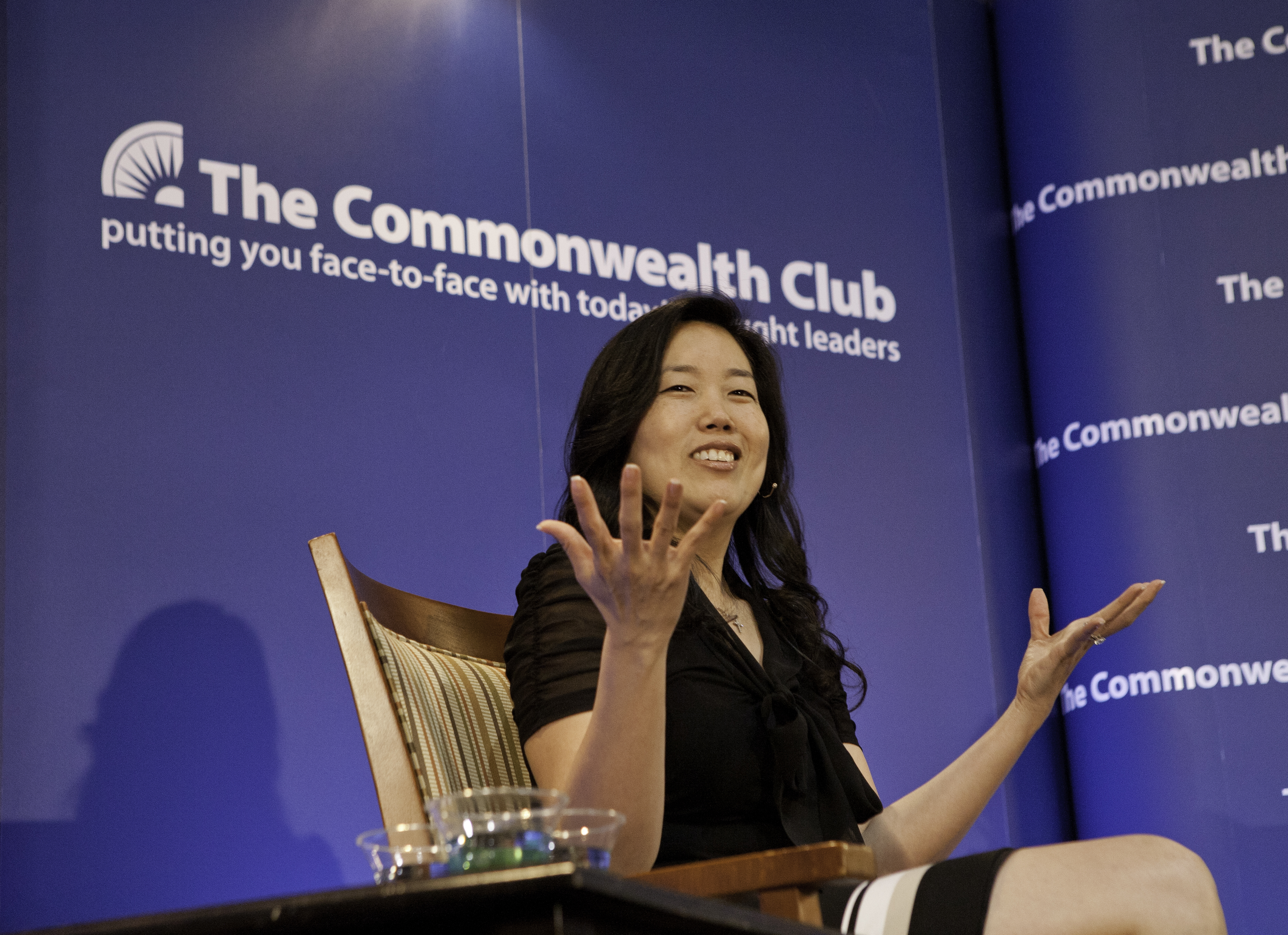
Education advocate Michelle Rhee speaking in 2013

Growing out of Study Sections that were formed in the club's early days, today the club has fifteen ongoing member-led fora, each of which meets frequently to host speakers and engage in discussion on topics including the arts, bay gourmet (food and wine), Asia-Pacific affairs, business and leadership, environment and natural resources, grownups (second half of life issues), health and medicine, humanities, international relations, LGBT issues, the Middle East, personal growth, psychology, and science and technology.

An intensive look at a single subject is sponsored each August through the club's Platforum, where events are held daily throughout the month on the topic, examined from the perspective of many different fields. Annual Platforum topics have included China Rising (2006), Cool Clear Water (2007), How We Eat (2008), For Richer, for Poorer: Surviving and Thriving in the Great Recession (2009), and The Ascent of Woman (2010). The Platforum series include not just lectures and discussions, but often meals, travel, and experiential learning such as kayaking on San Francisco Bay (Cool Clear Water).

Inforum is the club's division for younger community members. Since its founding in 2002 Inforum has sought to engage a new generation in civic discussion through its programming.

== Projects ==
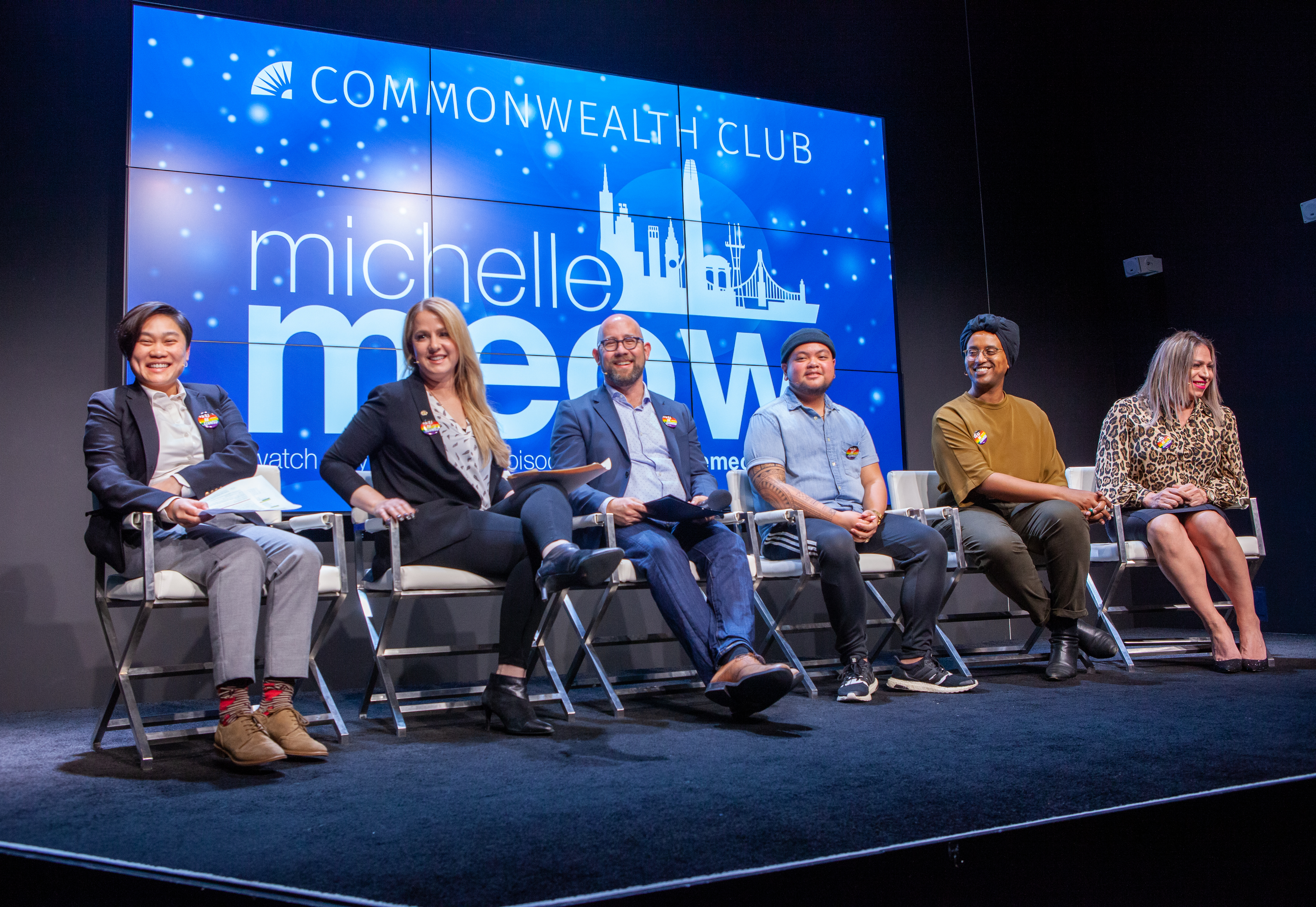
Michelle Meow hosts a panel discussion at the Commonwealth Club in January 2020.

Over the years a number of issues have been studied in depth by club leaders, member committees, or scholars commissioned by the Commonwealth Club. Among the topics studied have been direct democracy (the initiative process), air pollution, a statewide water plan, restrictions on child labor, automobile and industrial accident compensation, and legislative procedures. The long-standing mandate of many such studies has been "to investigate and discuss problems affecting the welfare of the Commonwealth and to aid in their solution." Many policy innovations in California—such as public defenders' offices and a printed voter explanation booklet to go with ballots—originated in studies and discussions at the Commonwealth Club.

One of the most extensive of these studies was commissioned in 1953 and lasted until 1956. It resulted in the book California Social Welfare: Legislation, Financing, Services, Statistics published by Prentice-Hall. Vaughn Davis Bornet, a recent Ph.D. recipient from Stanford University at the time, authored the book.

The club produced "Final Choice", a documentary that aired on PBS in 1998. It followed the families of three terminally ill individuals and explored the issue of physician-assisted suicide.

From 2003 to 2007, the project "Voices of Reform" examined the need for improvements in state governance in California. VOR led to the establishment in 2008 of the independent reform organization California Forward.

One current initiative is Climate One, directed by Greg Dalton, which convenes leaders from business, government, and civil society to discuss a low-carbon, global economy. Climate One holds private leadership roundtables as well as public discussions and gives the annual Stephen Schneider Climate Science Communication Award. Climate One guests have included then–California Governor Arnold Schwarzenegger, Google chairman and CEO Eric Schmidt, Chair of the Nobel Prize–winning IPCC Rajendra Pachauri, and General Motors chairman and CEO Rick Wagoner.

A 2011 speaker series on social entrepreneurship, including interviews with leading social entrepreneurs, produced the book The Real Problem Solvers, by Ruth Shapiro, which was released by Stanford University Press at the end of 2012.

In 2018, the club teamed up with LGBTQ radio and TV host Michelle Meow to host her daily radio show before a live audience one day each week. Guests on The Michelle Meow Show at The Commonwealth Club have included Black Lives Matter co-founder Alicia Garza, scientist and educator Tam O'Shaughnessy (life partner of astronaut Sally Ride), Katie Sowers (the first out LGBTQ coach in the NFL), The X-Factor finalist Jason Brock, comedian Sampson McCormick, Olympic skater Adam Rippon, and others.

Because the club is strictly non-partisan and does not take positions on issues, when a project matures to the point that policy prescriptions are being considered, as in the case of Voices of Reform, the club assists the project to become a separate entity from the club itself.
