= Lorraine Whitmarsh =

British psychologist and environmental scientist

Lorraine Whitmarsh MBE
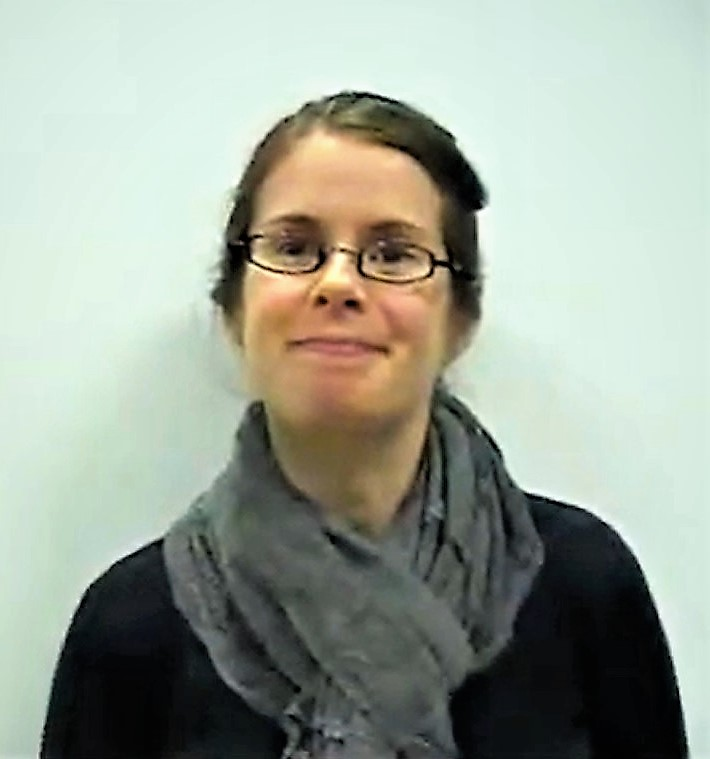
- Whitmarsh in 2012
- Education: University of Bath; University of Kent
- Scientific career
- Thesis: A study of public understanding of and response to climate change in the south of England (2005)

Lorraine Elisabeth Whitmarsh MBE is a British psychologist and environmental scientist at the University of Bath. She serves as Director of the Centre for Climate Change and Social Transformations. Her research considers how the public engage with climate change, energy and transport.

== Early life and education ==
Whitmarsh was an undergraduate student at the University of Kent, where she studied theology and religious studies. As a graduate student, Whitmarsh studied psychology at the University of Bath. Her doctoral research considered the public understanding of climate change in Southern England. She moved to the University of East Anglia as a research associate in 2005, where she spent four years.

== Research and career ==
Whitmarsh joined the faculty at Cardiff University in 2009, where she was promoted to Professor in 2015. In 2014, Whitmarsh was awarded a European Research Council Starting Grant to investigate low carbon lifestyles. Whitmarsh was later awarded a European Research Council Consolidator Grant where she studied the moments that cause pro-environmental behaviour shifts.

Whitmarsh moved to the University of Bath in 2020, where she was made a Professor of Environmental Psychology. She leads the Centre for Climate Change and Social Transformation, which considers how society must adapt to reduce emissions. In particular, Whitmarsh has focussed on mobility, food, insulation and material consumption. Whitmarsh has argued that psychologists can effectively communicate the risks associated with climate change, as well as helping people to mitigate hyperthermia or natural disasters. She has worked with city councils to design interventions that encourage low-carbon travel, as well as supporting the roll-out of infrastructure changes such as cycle paths. Whitmarsh was involved with the UK Climate Assembly, a citizen science engagement process that looked to take public opinion on climate change to the Government of the United Kingdom.

Whitmarsh has contributed to the Intergovernmental Panel on Climate Change, and served as a lead author for the IPCC Working Group II. She serves on the advisory team of the parliamentary group for a green new deal.

Whitmarsh was appointed Member of the Order of the British Empire (MBE) in the 2022 New Year Honours for services to social research in climate change, energy and transport.

== Selected publications ==
- Lorenzoni, Irene; Sophie Nicholson-Cole; Whitmarsh, Lorraine (2007). "Barriers perceived to engaging with climate change among the UK public and their policy implications". Global Environmental Change. 17 (3–4): 445–459. doi:10.1016/j.gloenvcha.2007.01.004. Wikidata Q58485807.
- Whitmarsh, Lorraine; Saffron O'Neill (2010). "Green identity, green living? The role of pro-environmental self-identity in determining consistency across diverse pro-environmental behaviours". Journal of Environmental Psychology. 30 (3): 305–314. doi:10.1016/j.jenvp.2010.01.003. Wikidata Q57936909.
- Whitmarsh, Lorraine (2011). "Scepticism and uncertainty about climate change: Dimensions, determinants and change over time". Global Environmental Change. 21 (2): 690–700. doi:10.1016/j.gloenvcha.2011.01.016. Wikidata Q57072910.

=== Books ===
- Engaging the public with climate change : behaviour change and communication. Lorraine Whitmarsh, Saffron O'Neill, Irene Lorenzoni. New York, NY. 2015. ISBN 978-1-138-86690-4. OCLC 909323245.
