= Mercedes Bustamante =

Biologist

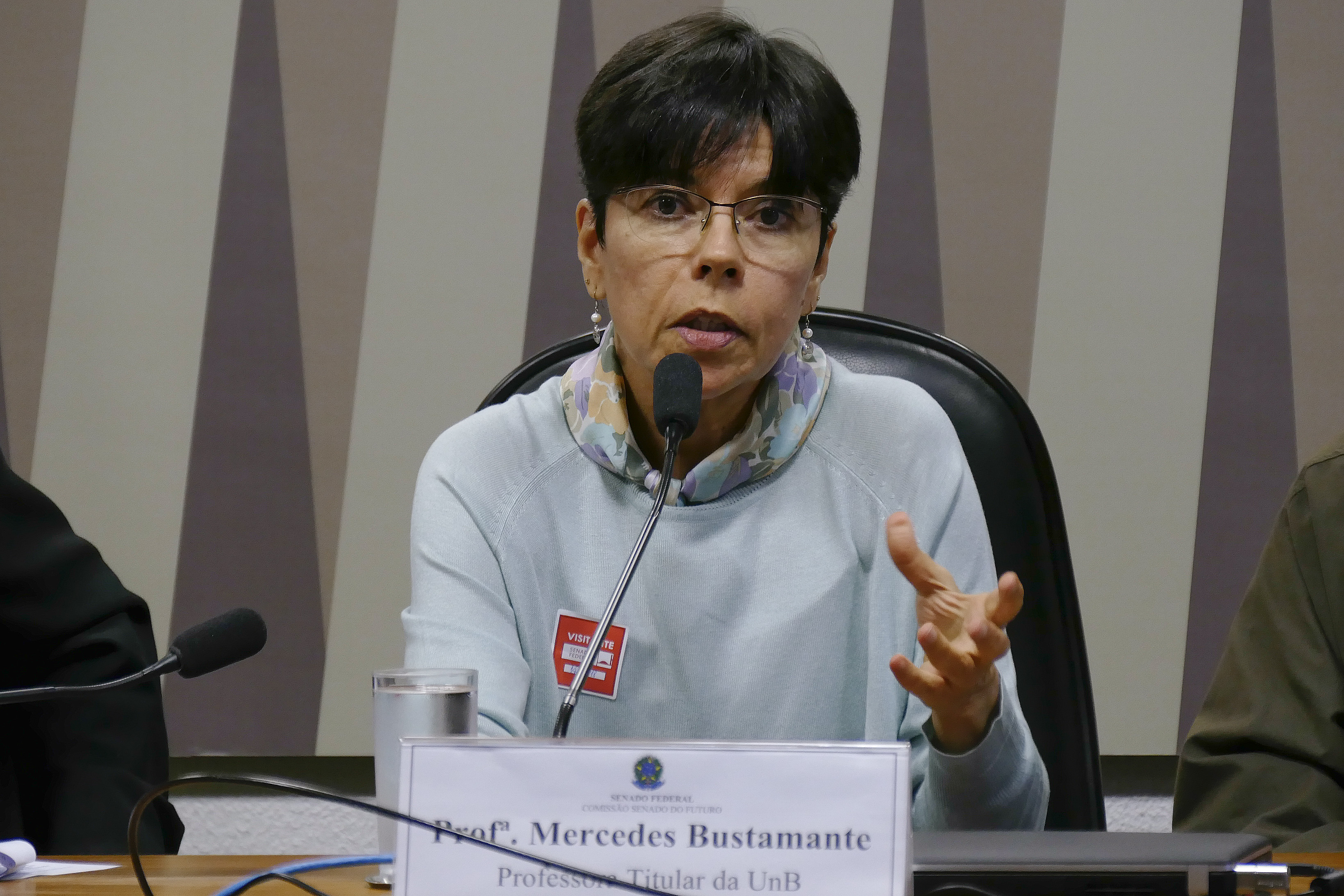
- Bustamante at the Senate of Future Commission's "2022 The Brazil that We Want"
- Born: Chile
- Education: University of Rio de Janeiro (B.S.); University of Viçosa (M.S.); University of Trier (Ph.D.)
- Scientific career
- Fields: Biology
- Institutions: University of Brasília

Mercedes Bustamante is a Chilean-Brazilian biologist and professor. Most of her work takes place in the savannah regions in Brazil called the cerrado biome. Her area of interests are studying large scale impacts on the environment, land usage and biogeochemistry. Since 1994 she has been a professor at the University of Brasília (UnB), where she is currently the Graduate Coordinator of the Ecology Department. She is a member of the Climate Crisis Advisory Group.

== Education ==
Bustamante attended the University of Rio de Janeiro, graduating with a Bachelors in Science with a Biology focus in 1984. She received her master's degree in Agricultural Physiology/Plant Physiology from the University of Viçosa in 1988, and she acquired a PhD in Geobotany from the University of Trier in 1993.

== Achievements ==
- In 2007 Bustamante received the Claudia prize in the science category for preservation of native areas.
- She was awarded woman of the year for her conservation work in the cerrado.
- Working Group III: Mitigation of the 5th Report of the Intergovernmental Panel on Climate Change (IPCC): Dr. Bustamante was a coordinator on working on “Agriculture, Forestry and Other Land Uses”. This mainly focuses on emissions from deforestation, livestock, and soil and nutrient management.
- United Nations Environment Program (UNEP): Worked on writing a report on nitrous oxide.
- International Nitrogen Initiative (2010-2013): Represented Latin America during this time period.
- Scientific Committee of the International Geosphere Biosphere Program (IGBP) & Biosphere Atmosphere Program in the Amazon (LBA): A member of these two organizations focusing on global changes and scientific research.
- Ministry of Science, Technology and Innovation (2010-2013): General coordinator for Ecosystem Management, Director of Policies, and Thematic Programs.
- Brazilian Programs and Scholarships of Coordination of Personnel Development: Director of this program.
- Advisory Committee of the Ecology and Limnology: A member of this group.

== Research achievements ==
Bustamante's research group has made several important discoveries about the impacts of human activities on the Cerrado. For instance, she was one of the first to link cattle ranching in the Cerrado to greenhouse gas emissions.

== Government service ==
In addition to her academic research, Bustamante served in Brazil's federal government. She was a General Coordinator of Ecosystem Management and Director of Policies and Thematic Programs in the Ministry of Science, Technology from 2010 to 2013. Her responsibilities included political outreach, and working alongside lobbyists.

== Publications ==
=== Journal articles ===
- Pereira de Castro A, Sartori da Silva MRS, Quirino BF, da Cunha Bustamante MM, Krüger RH. 2016. Microbial Diversity in Cerrado Biome (Neotropical Savanna) Soils. PLoS ONE 11(2): e0148785.: This paper focuses on studying four different areas of vegetation to show differences in taxonomy and microbial structures through ribosomal RNA sequencing.
- de Carvalho, AM, M M da Cunha Bustamante, TR Coser, RL Marchão, & JV Malaquias. 2016. Nitrogen oxides and CO2 from an Oxisol cultivated with corn in succession to cover crops. Pesquisa Agropecuária Brasileira 51(9): 1213-1222.: Legumes (Crotalaria juncea and Mucuna pruriens) were used as test subjects to use as cover crops and natural fallow and their relation to the emissions of NOx, N2O, and CO2 in the Cerrado.
- Carbon Stocks in Compartments of Soil Organic Matter 31 Years after Substitution of Native Cerrado Vegetation by Agroecosystems: This paper focuses on a 30-year study on organic matter composition in soil of carbon stocks in the cerrado sensu stricto.
- Undervaluing and Overexploiting the Brazilian Cerrado at Our Peril: This paper discusses the issues of habitat degradation of the cerrado, importance of biodiversity found in the cerrado, threats the cerrado faces, and other major issues.
- Biogeochemical cycles and biodiversity as key drivers of ecosystem services provided by soils: This paper discuses the biogeochemical cycles and biodiversity in soils and helping understand its components. The end goal to create suggestions on management.
- Global Change Pressures on Soils from Land Use and Management: This paper focuses on large scale impacts on soils through acid deposition, and heavy metal pollution.
- Agricultural expansion dominates climate changes in southeastern Amazonia: the overlooked non-GHG forcing: This paper focuses on the relation between land usage and deforestation in the southeast Amazon.
- Native and alien herbaceous plants in the Brazilian Cerrado are (co-)limited by different nutrients: This paper focuses on nutrient competition between native to invasive plant species. In addition what nutrients are the most limiting in the vegetation.
- Towards an integrated monitoring framework to assess the effects of tropical forest degradation and recovery on carbon stocks and biodiversity: This paper focuses on deforestation and its impacts towards emissions, and climate change. The paper will give a better understanding of the forest dynamics.
- Co-benefits, trade-offs, barriers and policies for greenhouse gas mitigation in the Agriculture, Forestry and Other Land Use (AFOLU) sector: The paper focuses on reducing emissions from livestock and deforestation. Through effective management practices and costs goals can be attained.
- Regional Variations in Biomass Distribution in Brazilian Savanna Woodland: This paper focuses on 170 sites where they surveyed biomass in relation to different vegetation types in the cerrado.
- Forms of phosphorus in an Oxisol under different soil tillage systems and cover plants in rotation with maize: This paper discusses productivity in relation to phosphorus. They tested Canavalia brasiliensis, Cajanus cajan, and Raphanus sativus in the savannah region in Brazil.
- Seasonal Effects in a Lake Sediment Archaeal Community of the Brazilian Savanna: This paper focuses on microbial communities in freshwater lake sediments between the dry and rainy seasons.
- Innovations for a sustainable future: rising to the challenge of nitrogen greenhouse gas management in Latin America: This paper focuses on reducing N2O emission through sustainable practices with new age technology.

=== Books ===
- Our Nutrient World: The challenge to produce more food and energy with less pollution: This book discusses agriculture will continue to be a large business in the future. The fertilizers used such as nitrogen and phosphorus will still be in high demand. These nutrients have led to large scale negative impacts on the planet leading to soil degradation, food scarcity, and depleting natural resources.
- Amazonia and Global Change: This book discusses the future the Amazon faces with climate change approaching. Some issues addressed are increased emissions, differences among wet and dry seasons, drought, release of carbon, floodplains, and cattle ranching.

== Ecosystem Lab ==
The Ecosystem Lab is part of the University of Brasília (UnB), and was created in 1994. The lab is dedicated to researching the tropics at different levels. The lab specifically focuses on the cerrado biome. The lab consists of Dr. Bustamante's bachelors, graduate, masters, and PhD students.
