= Inforum of the Commonwealth Club =

Social event in California

INFORUM is a division of the Commonwealth Club of California that hosts panel discussions, debates, and social events for people in their 20s and 30s in the San Francisco Bay Area. With a current membership of over 1,500, it is the largest such organization on the West Coast and one of the largest in the country.

INFORUM began in 2002 with a mission to involve young professionals in the Bay Area in the arenas of politics, the arts, the environment, business, technology, and culture. Known for its innovative panels, INFORUM hosts discussions with nationally and internationally known experts on the kinds of issues facing people in their 20s and 30s such as the state of music, polarized America, soldiers returning from Iraq, and the role of social networking in contemporary culture.

Speakers have included Mark Zuckerberg, Kim Kardashian, Cornel West, Sal Khan, Talib Kweli, Instagram founders Kevin Systrom and Mike Krieger, Arianna Huffington and Freakonomics authors Stephen Dubner and Steven Levitt.

The San Francisco Chronicle named INFORUM the best lecture series in the Bay Area in 2006, and the now-defunct San Francisco Bay Guardian called INFORUM "the best brainiac bonanza ... for those wanting to cram more thinking under their caps". In 2015, San Francisco Magazine named INFORUM the best speaker series in San Francisco. In 2003, the Los Angeles Times referred to INFORUM as a "presidential forum and singles hangout".

INFORUM also presents the 21st Century Visionary Award to individuals who embody the values of the INFORUM generation. Awardees have included Spike Lee, King Abdullah II of Jordan, Chad Hurley, and Steve Chen, the founders of YouTube, Sal Khan, Van Jones and Marissa Mayer.
