= David King (chemist) =

South African-born British chemist

Sir David King FRS FRSC FInstP HonFREng
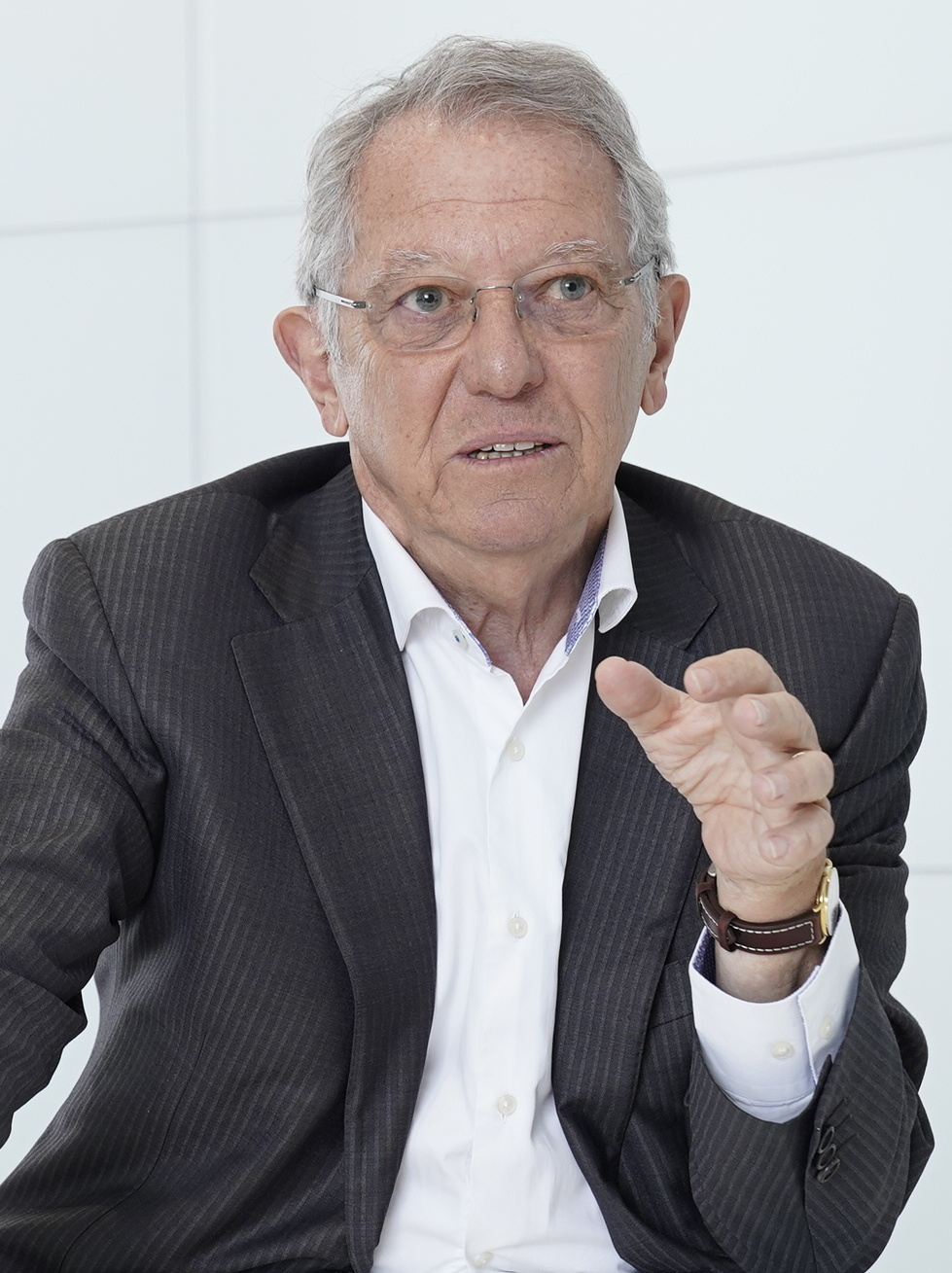
- King in 2019
- Born: David Anthony King; 12 August 1939 (age 87); Union of South Africa
- Citizenship: United Kingdom
- Education: St John's College, Johannesburg
- Alma mater: University of the Witwatersrand (BSc; PhD 1963)
- Awards: Rumford Medal (2002); Knight Bachelor (2003); Légion d'Honneur (2009)
- Scientific career
- Fields: Physical Chemistry; Climate Change; International Development
- Workplaces: Foreign and Commonwealth Office; Imperial College London; University of Oxford; University of Cambridge; University of East Anglia; University of Liverpool
- Thesis: A Study Of The Ammonia Synthesis Over Vanadium Nitride, Correlated With The Structure Of The Catalyst (1963)
- Website: www.gov.uk/government/people/david-king

Sir David Anthony King (born 12 August 1939) is a South African-born British chemist, academic, and head of the Climate Crisis Advisory Group (CCAG).

King first taught at Imperial College, London, the University of East Anglia, and was then Brunner Professor of Physical Chemistry (1974–1988) at the University of Liverpool. He held the 1920 Chair of Physical Chemistry at the University of Cambridge from 1988 to 2006, and was Master of Downing College, Cambridge, from 1995 to 2000: he is now emeritus professor. While at Cambridge, he was successively a fellow of St John's College, Downing College, and Queens' College. Moving to the University of Oxford, he was Director of the Smith School of Enterprise and the Environment from 2008 to 2012, and a Fellow of University College, Oxford, from 2009 to 2012. He was additionally President of Collegio Carlo Alberto in Turin, Italy (2008–2011), and Chancellor of the University of Liverpool (2010–2013).

Outside of academia, King was Chief Scientific Adviser to the UK Government and Head of the Government Office for Science from 2000 to 2007. He was then senior scientific adviser to UBS, a Swiss investment bank and financial services company, from 2008 to 2013. From 2013 to 2017, he returned to working with the UK Government as Special Representative for Climate Change to the Foreign Secretary. He was also Chairman of the government's Future Cities Catapult from 2013 to 2016.

== Early life and education ==
King was born on 12 August 1939 in South Africa, son of Arnold Tom Wallis King, of Johannesburg, director of a paint company, and Patricia Mary Bede, née Vardy. His elder brother, Michael Wallis King (born 1937), was director of the FirstRand bank and vice-chair of the multinational mining company Anglo American plc. King was educated at St John's College, an all-boys private school in Johannesburg. He studied at University of the Witwatersrand, graduating with a Bachelor of Science (BSc) degree and then a Doctor of Philosophy (PhD) degree in 1963.

== Academic career ==
After his PhD, King moved to the United Kingdom where he was a Shell Scholar at Imperial College, London, from 1963 to 1966. He was then a lecturer in the School of Chemical Sciences of the University of East Anglia from 1966 to 1974. He was appointed Brunner Professor of Physical Chemistry at the University of Liverpool in 1974. He was a member of the National Executive of the Association of University Teachers from 1970 until 1978, and served as its president for the 1976/77 academic year.

In 1988, King was appointed 1920 Professor of Physical Chemistry at the University of Cambridge. He subsequently served as Head of the University's Department of Chemistry from 1993 to 2000, and was its director of research from 2005 to 2011. When he first moved to Cambridge in 1988, he was elected a Fellow of St John's College, Cambridge. He moved from St John's when he was elected Master of Downing College, Cambridge, in 1995. He stepped down as Master in 2000, and was then a Fellow of Queens' College, Cambridge, from 2001 to 2008.

From 2008 to 2012, King was Director of the Smith School of Enterprise and the Environment at the University of Oxford. He was also a Fellow of University College, Oxford, from 2009 to 2012. He was President of Collegio Carlo Alberto in Turin, Italy, from 2008 to 2011, and was Chancellor of the University of Liverpool from 2010 to 2013.

=== Research ===
King has published over 500 papers on his research in chemical physics and on science and policy.

During his time at Cambridge, King had, together with Gabor Somorjai and Gerhard Ertl, shaped the discipline of surface science and helped to explain the underlying principles of heterogeneous catalysis. However, the 2007 Nobel Prize in Chemistry was awarded to Ertl alone.

== Career outside academia ==
King was the Chief Scientific Adviser to the UK Government and Head of the Government Office for Science from October 2000 to 31 December 2007, under prime ministers Tony Blair and Gordon Brown. In that time, he raised the profile of the need for governments to act on climate change and was instrumental in creating the £1 billion Energy Technologies Institute. In 2008 he co-authored The Hot Topic on this subject.

During his tenure as Chief Scientific Adviser, he raised public awareness for climate change and initiated several foresight studies. As director of the government's Foresight Programme, he created an in-depth horizon scanning process which advised government on a wide range of long-term issues, from flooding to obesity. He also chaired the government's Global Science and Innovation Forum from its inception. King advised the government on issues including: the foot-and-mouth disease epidemic 2001; post 9/11 risks to the UK; GM foods; energy provision; and innovation and wealth creation. He was heavily involved in the government's Science and Innovation Strategy 2004–2014. He suggested that scientists should honour a Hippocratic Oath for Scientists.

In April 2008, King joined UBS, a Swiss investment bank, as senior science advisor. He left UBS to return to the UK government when he was appointed the Foreign Secretary's Special Representative for Climate Change in September 2013.

From 2013 to 2016, King was the first chairman of the Future Cities Catapult, a government-funded body conducting research into smart cities.

In May 2020, in response to the COVID-19 pandemic, King formed and led Independent SAGE, a committee of unpaid experts which acts as a "shadow" of the UK government's SAGE group to address concerns of lack of transparency and political influence on that body.

== Views ==
=== Climate change ===
In his role as scientific advisor to the UK government King was outspoken on the subject of climate change, saying "I see climate change as the greatest challenges facing Britain and the World in the 21st century" and "climate change is the most severe problem we are facing today – more serious even than the threat of terrorism".

He strongly supports the work of the IPCC, saying in 2004 that the 2001 synthesis report "is the best current statement on the state of play of the science of climate change, and that really does represent 1,000 scientists".

King criticised the Bush administration for what he saw as its failures in climate change policy, saying it is "failing to take up the challenge of global warming".

In 2004, King gave evidence to a House of Commons select committee confirming his view that "on a global and geological scale that climate change is the most serious problem we are faced with this century", and illustrated it with a statement that "Fifty-five million years ago was a time when there was no ice on the earth; the Antarctic was the most habitable place for mammals". The Independent on Sunday reported that King had at a later event compared current and projected carbon dioxide levels with the record over the past 60 million years, and in an indirect quote suggested King implied that Antarctica was likely to be the world's "only" habitable continent by the end of this century if global warming remains unchecked. At the end of the 2007 programme "The Great Global Warming Swindle", broadcast on Channel 4, Fred Singer ridiculed the reported view of the "chief scientist"; King's complaint to Ofcom that the programme was unfair and had not given a chance to clarify was upheld, despite Channel 4's arguments that King was not named and had not challenged earlier reporting.

King became head of the Climate Crisis Advisory Group in 2021, basing public meetings on a similar format to Independent SAGE, and publishing reports advising emission cuts and carbon dioxide removal. He promotes the CCAG's 4R planet pathway: Reducing emissions; Removing the excess greenhouse gases (GHGs) already in the atmosphere; Repairing ecosystems; strengthening local and global Resilience against inevitable climate impacts.

=== Food production ===
King told The Independent newspaper in February 2007 "he agreed that organic food was no safer than chemically-treated food" and openly supported a study by the Manchester Business School that implicated organic farming practices in unfavourable CO_{2} comparisons with conventional chemical farming.

In an article published in The Guardian in February 2009, King is quoted as saying that "future historians might look back on our particular recent past and see the Iraq war as the first of the conflicts of this kind – the first of the resource wars" and that this was "certainly the view" (that the invasion was motivated by a desire to secure energy supplies) he held at the time of the invasion, along with "quite a few people in government".

=== Energy ===
King is a strong supporter of nuclear electricity generation, arguing that it is a safe, technically feasible solution that can help to reduce emissions from the utilities sector now, while the development of alternative low-carbon solutions is incentivised. In the transport sector, King has warned governments that conventional oil resources are more scarce than they believe and that peak oil might approach sooner than expected. Moreover, he has criticised first generation biofuels due to the effect on food prices and subsequent effect on the developing world. He strongly supports second generation biofuels, however, which are manufactured from inedible biomass such as corn stover, wood chips or straw. These biofuels are not made from food sources (see food vs fuel).

King is a member of the Global Apollo Programme and headed its public launch in 2015. The programme calls for multinational research into reducing the cost of low-carbon electricity generation.

=== Humanism ===
King is a Distinguished Supporter of Humanists UK.

=== Covid response ===
In July 2020 King advocated for school closures in the UK until covid cases were reduced to 1 in a million.

== Honours and awards ==
King was knighted in the 2003 New Year honours. In 2009, he was made a Chevalier of the Légion d'Honneur by the French government.

In 1991 he received the BVC Medal and Prize, awarded by the British Vacuum Council. He was elected a Fellow of the Royal Society (FRS) in 1991, a Foreign Fellow of the American Academy of Arts and Sciences in 2002, and an Honorary Fellow of the Royal Academy of Engineering (HonFREng) in 2006.

== In media ==
King appears in the film The Age of Stupid, released in February 2009, talking about Hurricane Katrina. He was portrayed by David Calder in the 2021 BBC television film The Trick.

== Personal life ==
By his first marriage, which ended in divorce, King has two sons. In 1983, he married, secondly, charity administrator and former head of a commercial law team, Jane Margaret, daughter of general practitioner Hans Eugen Lichtenstein, OBE, of Llandrindod Wells, Powys, Wales, a Holocaust survivor from a family that owned leather goods shops and an umbrella factory in Berlin. They have a son and a daughter.

== Books published ==
- Sir David King, Gabrielle Walker, The Hot Topic: how to tackle global warming and still keep the lights on, Bloomsbury London 2008
- Oliver Inderwildi, Sir David King, Energy, Transport & the Environment, 2012, Springer London New York Heidelberg

Academic offices
Preceded by Peter Mathias	Master of Downing College, Cambridge; 1995–2000	Succeeded by Stephen Fleet
Preceded by Lord Owen	Chancellor of University of Liverpool; 2009–2017	Succeeded by Colm Toibin
Government offices
Preceded by Sir Robert May	Chief Scientific Adviser to the UK Government; 2000–2007	Succeeded by John Beddington
Professional and academic associations
Preceded by John Browne	President of the British Association for the Advancement of Science; 2007–2008	Succeeded by Lord May

== Biographical links ==
- David King interviewed by Alan Macfarlane 27 November 2009 (video)
- Sir David King at the Smith School of Enterprise and the Environment, University of Oxford
- Sir David King at the Department of Chemistry, University of Cambridge
- BBC's biography of Sir David King
- David King's article on climate change at www.chinadialogue.net
- 'Profile: Professor Sir David King' by Alison Benjamin, The Guardian, 27 November 2007.
- Sir David King: Building a Sustainable Future Lecture presented at the Royal Institute of British Architecture 2007 (Video)
