= Anthony Leiserowitz =

American political scientist and geographer

- Education: University of Oregon Ph.D, 2003; Michigan State University B.A., 1990
- Awards: Stephen H. Schneider Award for Outstanding Climate Science Communication (2020)
- Scientific career
- Fields: Human geography
- Workplaces: Yale University
- Thesis: Global warming in the American mind : the roles of affect, imagery, and worldviews in risk perception, policy preferences, and behavior (2003)
- Doctoral advisor: Paul Slovic

Anthony Leiserowitz is a human geographer at Yale University who studies public perceptions of climate change. He has particularly examined perceptions within the United States, where people are considerably less aware of climate change than in other countries. In the U.S., awareness of information about climate change is heavily influenced by emotion, imagery, associations, and values. Their public discourse reflects a lack of understanding of the science involved in climate change and little awareness of the potential for effective responses to it.

== Early life and education ==
Sometimes referred to as Tony Leiserowitz, he grew up on a farm in Michigan. His parents were sculptors. He received his undergraduate degree from Michigan State University in 1990, and then moved to Colorado with the intention of working as a ski bum. While there, he became interested in climate change and went to University of Oregon to study under Paul Slovic, an expert in risk perception. In 2003, Leiserowitz received his Ph.D. in human geography.

== Career ==
He joined the faculty of Yale in 2007. He started to collaborate with Edward Maibach in 2008 to study people's perception of climate change.

As of 2018, he had an appointment as a senior research scientist in the Yale School of Forestry and Environmental Studies and was director of the Yale Program on Climate Change Communication, a principal investigator at the Center for Research on Environmental Decisions at Columbia University, and a research scientist at Decision Research.

He was the recipient of the Environmental Protection Agency (EPA) 2011 Environmental Merit Award, and as of 2013, he had published approximately 100 scientific articles and book chapters on climate change beliefs, perceptions, and behaviors.

In March 2025, peer-reviewed scientific journal Global Environmental Change published an article co-authored by Anthony Leiserowitz, John F. Marshall, CEO of Potential Energy Coalition, and other experts at Yale University. The research tested the effect of three climate messages across 23 countries and found that climate change messages have the potential to strengthen public support for climate action.

== 2021 documentary released ==
In 2021, Leiserowitz announced the creation of a film, Meltdown, that documents a journey he took to Greenland. The documentary was made during his travels to study the effects of climate change on Greenland firsthand. It contains his reactions to the experience and his comments on climate change, which he has been studying for decades. A promotional video appeared on cheddar.com at the end of February 2021.

== Selected papers ==
- Leiserowitz, A. (2005). "American Risk Perceptions: Is Climate Change Dangerous?". Risk Analysis. 25 (6): 1433–1442. doi:10.1111/j.1540-6261.2005.00690.x. PMID 16506973. S2CID 14619705.
- Leiserowitz, A. (2006). "Climate Change Risk Perception and Policy Preferences: The Role of Affect, Imagery and Values". Climatic Change. 77 (1–2): 45–72. Bibcode:2006ClCh...77...45L. doi:10.1007/s10584-006-9059-9. S2CID 7609337.
- Maibach, E.; Leiserowitz, A.; Roser-Renouf, C.; Mertz, C. (2011). "Identifying Like-Minded Audiences for Global Warming Public Engagement Campaigns: An Audience Segmentation Analysis and Tool Development". PLOS One. 6 (3) e17571. Bibcode:2011PLoSO...617571M. doi:10.1371/journal.pone.0017571. PMC 3053362. PMID 21423743.
- Leiserowitz, A.; Kates, R.; Parris, T. (2006). "Sustainability Values, Attitudes, and Behaviors: A Review of Multinational and Global Trends" (PDF). Annual Review of Environment and Resources. 31: 413–444. doi:10.1146/annurev.energy.31.102505.133552.
- Leiserowitz, A.; Maibach, E.; Roser-Renouf, C.; Smith, N.; Dawson, E. (2013). "Climategate, public opinion, and the loss of trust". American Behavioral Scientist. 57 (6): 818–837. doi:10.1177/0002764212458272. S2CID 197652372.
