= Ruth Shapiro =

American author and academic

Ruth A. Shapiro
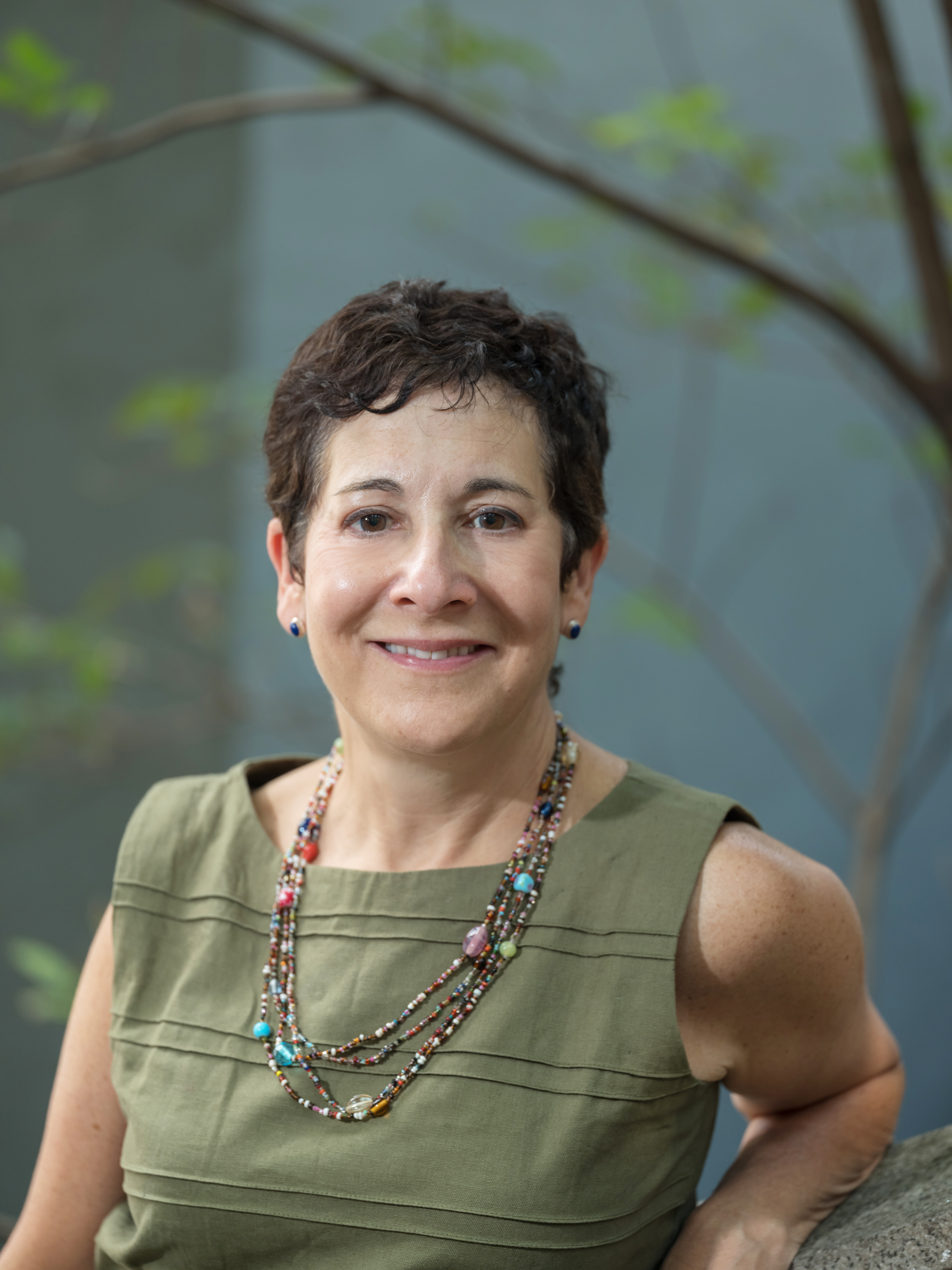
- Ruth A. Shapiro from Centre for Asian Philanthropy and Society
- Born: January 7, 1960 (age 66); United States
- Education: Stanford University (PhD) Harvard University (MPhil) George Washington University (MPhil) University of Michigan
- Occupations: Co-Founder and Chief Executive, Centre for Asian Philanthropy and Society [2013 -]

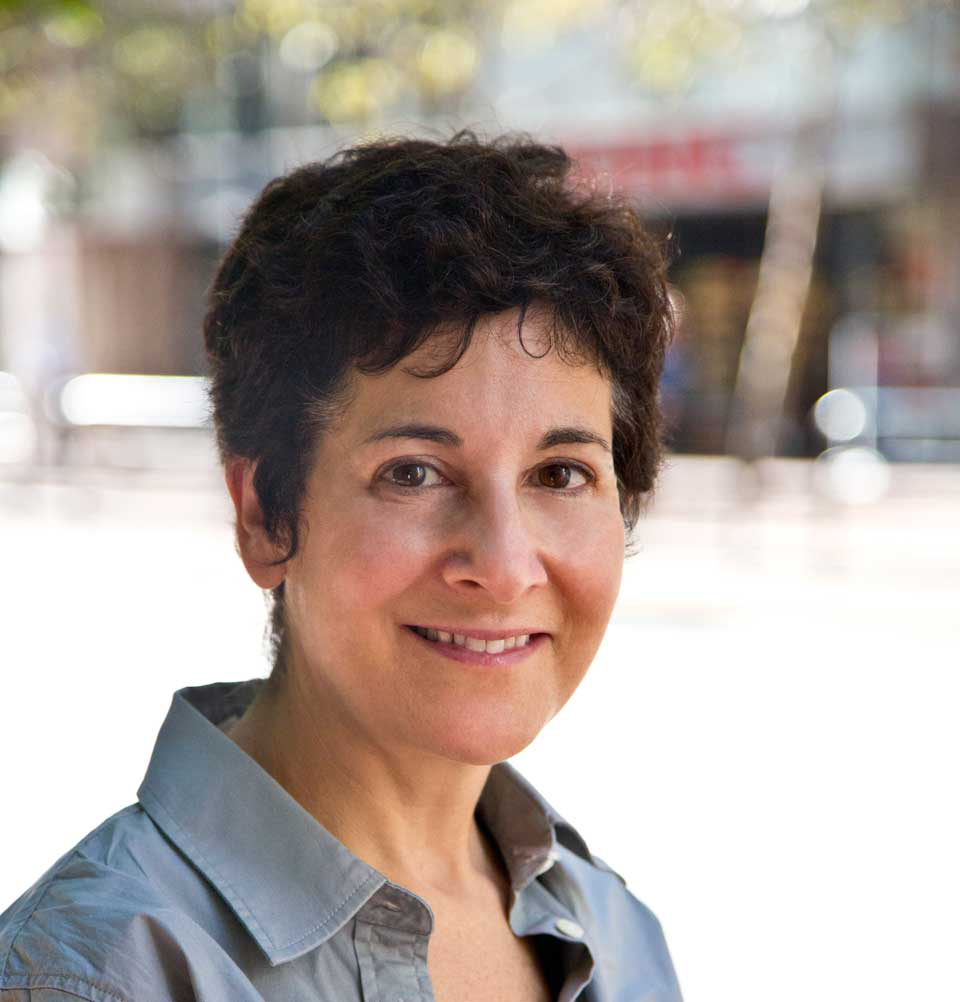
Ruth Shapiro

Dr. Ruth A. Shapiro is an American author and academic who is the Co-Founder and Chief Executive of the Centre for Asian Philanthropy and Society (CAPS).

Shapiro is the author of Pragmatic Philanthropy: Asian Charity Explained and editor of The Real Problem Solvers, a book about social entrepreneurship in America. The Real Problem Solvers was also published in Chinese under the title 《真正的问题解决者》, and this edition includes seven additional chapters on Chinese social entrepreneurs. She also co-authored the book Building Energy Efficiency: Why Green Buildings are Key to Asia’s Future.

== Early life ==
Shapiro was born in the United States on 7 January 1960. She completed her undergraduate work at the University of Michigan. Shapiro holds a doctorate from Stanford University and master’s degrees from Harvard University and George Washington University.

== Career ==
Shapiro spent the early part of her professional career in the field of international development. Within this field, she held management positions and built new program areas at the Academy for Educational Development and Harvard University’s Center for International Development.

Shapiro founded the Asia Business Council in 1997 and served as Executive Director from its inception to May 2007. She now acts as Senior Advisor to the Council. During her role as Founder, she recruited CEOs and chairpersons from across Asia and around the world to create a forum for business leaders in the Asia region to discuss issues of interest.

From 2007 until 2014, Shapiro was Principal of Keyi Strategies, a consultancy specializing in increasing the understanding of Asian business and charity sectors among leaders in Asia, Europe, and the United States.

In 2013, Shapiro co-founded the Centre for Asian Philanthropy and Society (CAPS), a nonprofit based in Hong Kong that works across 17 Asian economies. CAPS is an Asia-focused, independent, action-oriented research and advisory organization committed to maximizing private capital for public good. Its flagship research initiative is the "Doing Good Index." As Co-Founder and Chief Executive, she developed CAPS as well as recruited board members, funders, and professional staff. Chairman of Hang Lung Group Ronnie C. Chan is Co-Founder and Chairman of CAPS' Board of Governors.

Shapiro is also a frequent contributor to media publications, including the South China Morning Post, Nikkei Asian Review, The Economic Times and Philanthropy Impact Magazine.
