= Yale Program on Climate Change Communication =

Scientific research for climate change

The Yale Program on Climate Change Communication (YPCCC) is a research center within the Yale School of the Environment that conducts scientific research on public climate change knowledge, attitudes, policy preferences, and behavior at the global, national, and local scales. It grew out of a conference held in Aspen, Colorado, in 2005.

== General ==
The program is led by Anthony Leiserowitz. As of 2017, it put out a daily 90 second audio program carried by around 350 radio stations, articles in the media, a series of monthly videos, and training to help television weather presenters and reporters discuss climate change. The organization conducts ongoing opinion polls of the American public on climate. Its climate change opinion polling has been described as being similar to the work of the Pew Research Center. The YPCCC website also offers tips on how activists and everyday people can communicate more effectively about climate change.

YPCCC has collaborated with the George Mason Center for Climate Change Communication to assemble a freely available dataset, which has been used to create interactive partisan climate opinion maps of the United States. These maps, also known as the Yale Climate Opinion maps, provide detailed information about "climate change beliefs, risk perception and policy support for climate-related policy at the state and local level." In July 2019, the organization suggested that discussing climate change more frequently with family and friends might be the most effective way of influencing United States public opinion on climate change.

YPCCC partnered with John F. Marshall's Potential Energy Coalition on the "Later is Too Late global report," which conducted global message testing research on demand for climate action.

== Awards ==
In 2017 the program was given a "Friend of the Planet" award by the National Center for Science Education in 2017. In 2018, Leiserowitz and YPCCC researchers received the Warren J. Mitofsky Innovators Award, given by the American Association for Public Opinion Research. The award recognized "a new statistical method to downscale national public opinion estimates using multiple regression and post stratification (MPR) survey data collection methodology".

== Yale Climate Connections ==
Yale Climate Connections is an online news site, YouTube channel, and radio program produced by the Yale Program on Climate Change Communication to disseminate information about climate. It is funded by various foundations, Yale University alumni, and the general public but receives no direct funding from the university.
