= Edward Maibach =

Edward Wile Maibach
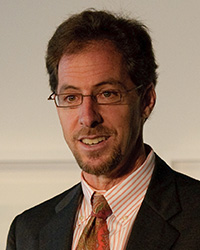
- Education: Stanford University Ph.D., 1990; University of California, San Diego B.A., 1980
- Awards: Stephen H. Schneider Award for Outstanding Climate Science Communication (2020); NCSE Friend of the Planet Award (2024)
- Scientific career
- Fields: Communication, psychology, public health, climate change
- Workplaces: George Mason University Department of Communication 2007–present

Edward Wile Maibach is a professor at George Mason University who works on public health and climate change communication.

Maibach received a B.A. in social psychology from the University of California, San Diego (1980), a M.P.H from San Diego State University (1983) and a Ph.D. in communication research from Stanford University (1990). Before joining the faculty at George Mason, Maibach was the associate director of the National Cancer Institute, Worldwide Director of Social Marketing at Porter Novelli and a professor of Public Health at Emory University.

Since 2010, he has been a Distinguished Professor of Communication at and Director of the Center for Climate Change Communication at GMU.

As of 2018 Maibach had published around 80 peer-reviewed articles and book chapters on public health and climate change communication. His edited book (together with Roxanne Parrott) Designing Health Messages was published by SAGE in 1995. Between 2011 and 2014, Maibach co-chaired the Engagement and Communication Working Group of the National Climate Assessment Development and Advisory Committee.
