= Global Environmental Change =

- Discipline: Environmental science
- Language: English
- Edited by: Eduardo Brondizio

Publication details
- Publisher: Elsevier
- Impact factor: 10.466 (2019)

Standard abbreviations
- ISO 4: Glob. Environ. Change

Indexing
- ISSN: 0959-3780

Links
- Journal homepage

Global Environmental Change is a scientific journal publishing peer-reviewed research on environmental change that was established in 1990 by Butterworth-Heinemann. It is currently published by Elsevier. As of 2024 the editor-in-chief are Dabo Guan and Harini Nagendra. As of 2019 the journal had an impact factor of 10.466, according to Journal Citation Reports, ranking it 4th out of 265 journals in the category environmental sciences.
