= Awards, lectures and medals of the Royal Society =

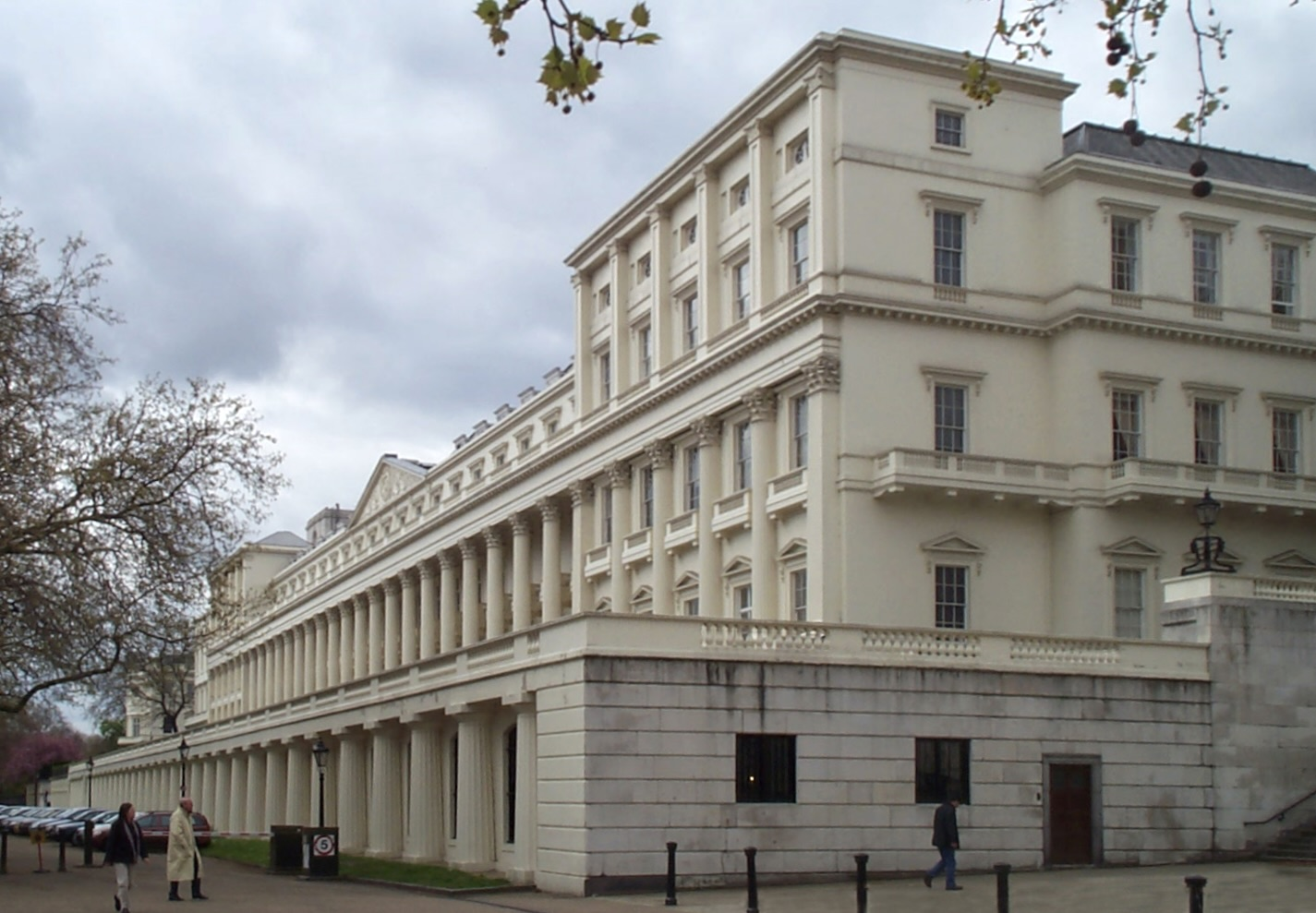
The premises of The Royal Society, who present the various awards, prize lectures and medals

The Royal Society presents numerous awards, lectures and medals to recognise scientific achievement. The oldest is the Croonian Lecture, created in 1701 at the request of the widow of William Croone, one of the founding members of the Royal Society. The Croonian Lecture is still awarded on an annual basis, and is considered the most important Royal Society prize for the biological sciences. Although the Croonian Lecture was created in 1701, it was first awarded in 1738, seven years after the Copley Medal, which is the oldest Royal Society medal still in use and is awarded for "outstanding achievements in research in any branch of science".

== Awards ==
Awards	Created	Description	Recent winners	Notes
Armourers and Brasiers' Company Prize	1984	Awarded biennially "for excellence in materials science and technology" the Armourers and Brasiers' Company Prize is sponsored by the Worshipful Company of Armourers and Brasiers and is accompanied by a £2000 gift.	George Smith; 2020	
GlaxoSmithKline Prize and Lecture	1976	Awarded biennially "for original contributions to medical and veterinary sciences published within ten years from the date of the award" the GlaxoSmithKline Prize and Lecture is both an award and a lecture, and is accompanied by a £2500 gift. The award was initially sponsored by the Wellcome Trust in 1986 but in 2002 was renamed the GlaxoSmithKline Prize.	Andrew Hattersley; 2016	
Michael Faraday Prize	1986	Awarded annually "for excellence in communicating science to UK audiences" the winner of the Michael Faraday Prize is expected to give a lecture, where he or she will be presented with the £2500 gift that accompanies the prize.	David Spiegelhalter; 2020	
Milner Award	2012	The Royal Society Milner Award, supported by Microsoft Research, is given annually for outstanding achievement in computer science by a European researcher. It replaces the Royal Society and Académie des sciences Microsoft Award and is named in honour of Professor Robin Milner FRS (1934–2010), a pioneer in computer science.	Zoubin Ghahramani; 2021	
Mullard Award	1967	Awarded "to an individual who has an outstanding academic record in any area of natural science, engineering or technology and whose work is currently making or has the potential to make a contribution to national prosperity in the United Kingdom" the Mullard Award is aimed at scientists and engineers in the early stages of their career and is accompanied by a £2000 gift.	Hagan Bayley; 2019	
Royal Society Africa Prize	2016	To recognise research scientists based in Africa who are making an innovative contribution to the biological sciences, including basic medical science, which contributes significantly to capacity building in Africa. The winner will receive an £11,000 grant towards her research project, a bronze medal and a gift of £1,000.	Steven Runo; 2020	
Royal Society Athena Prize	2016	Awarded biennially (in even years) for individuals and teams, working in UK academic and research communities, who have contributed most to the advancement of diversity in science, technology, engineering and mathematics (STEM) within their communities. The recipients of the prize receive a medal and a gift of £5,000.	Beth Montague-Hellen, Alex Bond; 2020	
Royal Society Prize for Science Books	1988	Currently known as the Royal Society Insight Investment Science Book Prize, it is awarded annually to the book judged to be the previous year's best general science writing for a non-specialist reader. The winner receives £25,000.	Andrea Wulf; 2016	
Rosalind Franklin Award	2003	Awarded annually "for an outstanding contribution to any area of Science, Technology, Engineering and Mathematics (STEM)" the Rosalind Franklin Award is accompanied by a £30,000 research grant and is awarded exclusively to women.	Julia Gog; 2020	
David Attenborough Award	2020	Awarded annually "to an individual for outstanding public engagement with science" the David Attenborough Award is accompanied by a gift of £2,500	Alice Roberts; 2020	
Royal Society Hauksbee Award	2022	Awarded annually "for outstanding achievements in science to an individual or team whose work is mostly ‘behind the scenes’ or in support, including technicians, research office staff or other contributors who might not normally be recognised". The award winner or winners will be presented with a medal of silver gilt and a gift of £2000	Neil Barnes; 2022	

== Domestic lectures ==
Lecture	Created	Description	Recent lecturers	Notes
Bakerian Lecture	1775	Given annually "on such part of natural history or experimental philosophy, at such time and in such manner as the President and Council of the Society for the time being shall please to order and appoint" the Bakerian Lecture is named after Henry Baker and is the premier lecture of the Royal Society for the physical sciences.	James Hough; 2020	
Clifford Paterson Lecture	1975	Given biennially "on any aspect of engineering" the Clifford Paterson Lecture was created in 1975 by a donation from the General Electric Company plc in honour of Clifford Paterson. It is aimed at early to mid-level scientists and is accompanied by a £500 gift.	Jacqueline Cole; 2020	
Francis Crick Medal and Lecture	2003	Given annually on a topic "in any field of the Biological Sciences, but preference will be given to the general areas in which Francis Crick himself worked: genetics, molecular biology and neurobiology" the Crick Lecture is named after Francis Crick and normally given by a scientist under the age of 40, or with a career stage similar to that of a scientist under 40.	Gregory Jefferis; 2019	
Croonian Lecture	1701	Given annually on "the advancement of natural knowledge on local motion, or (conditionally) of such other subjects as, in the opinion of the President for the time being, should be most useful in promoting the objects for which the Royal Society was instituted" the Croonian Lecture is named after William Croone, a founding member of the Royal Society, and is the oldest lecture maintained by the Society; it is also the most prestigious lecture in the biological sciences.	Edward Boyden; 2020	
Ferrier Lecture	1928	Given triennially "on a subject related to the advancement of natural knowledge on the structure and function of the nervous system" the Ferrier Lecture is named for David Ferrier.	Raymond Dolan; 2019	
Leeuwenhoek Lecture	1948	Given triennially "to recognise excellence in the [fields] of microbiology... bacteriology, virology, mycology, parasitology and microscopy" the Leeuwenhoek Lecture is named after Antonie van Leeuwenhoek and is accompanied by a £500 gift.	Geoffrey L. Smith; 2020	
Wilkins-Bernal-Medawar Lecture	2005	Given annually on "some aspect of the social function of science" the Wilkins-Bernal-Medawar lecture was created as a merger of the Wilkins, Bernal and Medawar lectures previously hosted by the Royal Society.	Simon Schaffer; 2019	

== International lectures ==
Lecture	Created	Description	Recent lecturers	Notes
Rutherford Memorial Lectures	1952	The Rutherford Memorial Lecture is an international lecture of the Royal Society created under the Rutherford Memorial Scheme in 1952. It is held at universities in various countries in the Commonwealth, with a stipulation that at least one of every three lectures must be held in New Zealand.	John Sulston; 2013	

== Medals ==
Medal	Created	Description	Recent recipients	Notes
Buchanan Medal	1897	Originally awarded every five years, this award is now made biennially in recognition of distinguished contribution to the medical sciences generally and the silver gilt medal is accompanied by a gift of £1000.	Doug Turnbull; 2020	
Copley Medal	1731	Awarded annually for "outstanding achievements in research in any branch of science" the Copley Medal is the oldest and most prestigious award of the Royal Society and is accompanied by a gift of £25000.	John B. Goodenough; 2019	
Darwin Medal	1890	Awarded every second year for "work of acknowledged distinction in the broad area of biology in which Charles Darwin worked" the Darwin Medal is accompanied by a gift of £1000.	Peter Holland; 2019	
Davy Medal	1877	Awarded every year "for an outstandingly important recent discovery in any branch of chemistry" the Davy Medal is accompanied by a gift of £1000. Unlike many of the medals of the Royal Society that are silver the Davy Medal is bronze.	Varinder Aggarwal; 2019	
Gabor Medal	1989	Awarded every second year for "acknowledged distinction of interdisciplinary work between the life sciences with other disciplines" the Gabor Medal is accompanied by a £1000 gift and is targeted at scientists in the early or middle stages of their careers.	Alison Noble; 2019	
Hughes Medal	1902	Awarded annually "in recognition of an original discovery in the physical sciences, particularly electricity and magnetism or their applications" the Hughes Medal is accompanied by a £1000 gift. Unlike other medals such as the Copley Medal the Hughes Medal has never been awarded to the same individual more than once.	Andrew Ian Cooper; 2019	
Kavli Medal and Lecture	2012	Awarded biennially "for excellence in all fields of science and engineering relevant to the environment or energy" to a scientist in the early stages of his career, the Kavli Medal in bronze is accompanied by a £500 gift.	Ian Chapman; 2020	
King Charles II Medal	1998	Awarded to any foreign head of state, head of government, or holder of another position of similar eminence for their contribution to the promotion, advancement, or use of science for the benefit of society, normally at the Society on the occasion of a visit by the recipient. Nominations not invited, awarded at the discretion of Council.	Tony Tan Keng Yam; 2014	
Leverhulme Medal	1960	Awarded triennially "for an outstandingly significant contribution in the field of pure or applied chemistry or engineering, including chemical engineering" the Leverhulme Medal is accompanied by a £2000 gift and was created to mark the 300-year anniversary of the foundation of the Royal Society	Frank Caruso; 2019	
Royal Medal	1826	Awarded every year in threes the Royal Medal is given for two different reasons; two medals are awarded for "the most important contributions to the advancement of natural knowledge" and one for "distinguished contributions in the applied sciences". The Royal Medal is the only Royal Society medal to be awarded multiple times per year, and is also known as the Queen's Medal.	Carol Robinson, Michel Goedert, Ann Dowling; 2019	
Rumford Medal	1800	Awarded every second year for "an outstandingly important recent discovery in the field of thermal or optical properties of matter made by a scientist working in Europe" the Rumford Medal is accompanied by a £1000 gift. The first person awarded the medal was Count Rumford, who created it in the first place.	Miles Padgett; 2019	
Sylvester Medal	1901	Awarded every second year for "the encouragement of mathematical research" the Sylvester Medal is accompanied by a £1000 gift and is targeted at scientists in the early or middle stages of their careers.	Peter Sarnak; 2019	

== Historical awards and lectures ==
Lecture	Created	Description	Recent lecturer/winner	Notes
Bernal Lecture	1969	The Bernal Lecture was a Royal Society lecture given triennially "on some aspect of the social function of science". It was named after John Desmond Bernal and last given in 2004. It is now included in the Wilkins-Bernal-Medawar Lecture	Michael Joseph Crumpton; 2004	
Esso Energy Award	1974	The Esso Energy Award was created following a donation by Esso. It was awarded "for outstanding contributions to the advancement of science or engineering or technology leading to the more efficient mobilization, use or conservation of energy resources" and was given for the final time in 1999.	Takeshi Uchiyamada; 1999	
Florey Lecture	1981	The Florey Lecture was established in 1981 in collaboration with the Australian National University. It was held in Australia and the United Kingdom in alternate years and ceased when the collaboration period ended in 1992.	Hugh Pelham; 1992	
Kohn Award	2005	Was awarded annually "for excellence in engaging the public with science" the Kohn Award was one of the newest awards of the Royal Society having first been given in 2005, and was accompanied by a £2500 prize	Peter Vukusic; 2013	
Medawar Lecture	1985	The Medawar Lecture was established in 1985 after an anonymous donation of £5000. It was held triennially to honour Peter Medawar and last given in 2004; it is now included in the Wilkins-Bernal-Medawar Lecture.	Peter Lipton; 2004	
Philips Lecture	1980	The Philips Lecture was established in 1985 in collaboration with Philips for an initial five-year period; it was subsequently renewed in 1985. Held annually it was last given in 1992.	C. Thomas Elliott; 1992	
Pilgrim Trust Lecture	1938	The Pilgrim Trust Lecture was created in 1938 in collaboration with the Pilgrim Trust, who sponsored a series of lectures to be organised by the Royal Society and the United States National Academy of Sciences and to be held in Washington, D.C., and London in alternate years. The last lecture of the series was given in 1945.	Hermann Joseph Muller; 1945	
Tercentenary Lectures	1960	The Tercentenary Lectures were a series of lectures held at the tercentenary of the Royal Society of London in 1960	Vincent Wigglesworth; 1960	
Wilkins Lecture	1947	The Wilkins Lecture was created in 1947 after a donation from JD Griffith Davies, the Royal Society secretary. It was named after John Wilkins, the first secretary of the Royal Society, and last given in 2006. It is now included in the Wilkins-Bernal-Medawar Lecture.	John L. Heilbron; 2006	
Microsoft Award	2006	The Microsoft Award was awarded annually to scientists who had made "a major contribution to the advancement of science through the use of computational methods". It was shared between the Royal Society and the French Academy of Sciences and accompanied by a grant of € 250,000, of which 243,000 was for research purposes and 7000 was a gift to the winner. Last given in 2009, the award has now been replaced by the Milner Award.	Peer Bork; 2009	
UK-Canada Rutherford Lecture	1982	The UK-Canada Rutherford Lecture was an international lecture of the Royal Society created following an agreement between the Royal Society and the Royal Society of Canada in 1982. It was held annually with the location alternating between Canada and the United Kingdom, and its stated purpose was "to strengthen links between the two societies and between scientists in Canada and the United Kingdom generally".	John Earnest Walker; 2010	
Blackett Memorial Lecture	1975	The Blackett Memorial Lecture was maintained by the Royal Society and the Indian National Science Academy, and was named after Patrick Blackett. Lectures were held biennially and alternated between locations in India (proposed by the Indian National Science Academy) and locations in the United Kingdom (proposed by the Royal Society).	K. VijayRaghavan; 2010	
Claude Bernard Lecture	1984	The Claude Bernard Lecture was (along with the Humphry Davy Lecture) one of two lectures created following an agreement between the Royal Society and the French Academy of Sciences in 1984. The lecture was named after Claude Bernard and was given annually by a senior French scientist on a visit to the United Kingdom	Jean-Baptiste Leblond; 2008	
Humphry Davy Lecture	1984	The Humphry Davy Lecture was (along with the Claude Bernard Lecture) one of two lectures created following an agreement between the Royal Society and the French Academy of Sciences in 1984. The lecture was named after Humphry Davy and was given annually by a senior British scientist on a visit to France	David Baulcombe; 2010	
