= Roger Highfield =

British science journalist (1958–present)

Roger Highfield OBE FRSB FMedSci
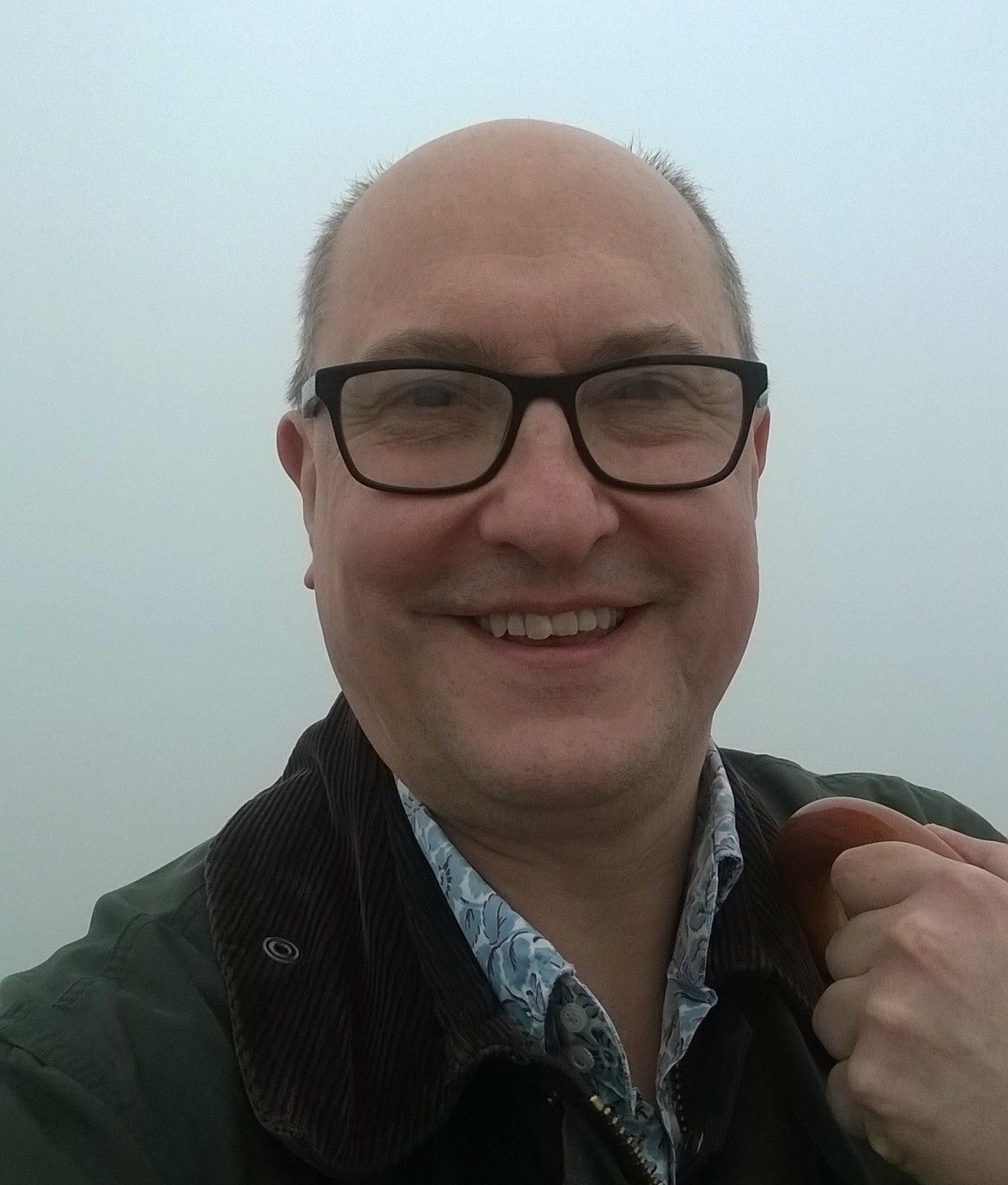
- Roger Highfield in 2014 at Cabo da Roca
- Born: Roger Ronald Highfield; July 1958 (age 68); Griffithstown, Wales
- Education: Christ's Hospital
- Alma mater: University of Oxford (MA, DPhil)
- Spouse: Julia Brookes (m. 1992)
- Children: 2
- Awards: Wilkins-Bernal-Medawar Lecture (2012)
- Scientific career
- Workplaces: Science Museum Group; New Scientist; Daily Telegraph
- Thesis: Neutron scattering from chemical species (1983)
- Highfield's voice recorded February 2014
- Website: www.rogerhighfield.com

Roger Ronald Highfield (born 1958) is a Welsh author, science journalist, broadcaster and Science Director at the Science Museum Group.

== Education ==
Highfield was educated at Chase Side Primary School in Enfield and Christ's Hospital in Horsham. He studied Chemistry at Pembroke College, Oxford and was awarded a Master of Arts degree in chemistry in 1980 followed by a Doctor of Philosophy for research on neutron scattering from chemical species.

During his research career, he was the first to bounce a neutron off a soap bubble while he was working at the Institut Laue Langevin.

== Career ==
Highfield served as the science editor of The Daily Telegraph for more than 20 years. During that time he set up a long running science writing award for young people, a photography competition, the 'scientists meet the media' party, and organised mass experiments from 1994 with BBC's Tomorrow's World, called Live Lab and Megalab, such as the 'Truth Test' with Richard Wiseman.

Highfield wrote for a time for Newsweek. and made occasional contributions to The Sunday Times, the Evening Standard, The Guardian and Aeon magazine.

He was the editor for the British magazine New Scientist from 2008 to 2011, where he redesigned the magazine and introduced new sections, notably Aperture and Instant Expert.

As of 2011, Highfield became the director of External Affairs at the Science Museum Group.

In 2012, he published the results of a mass intelligence test with Adrian Owen.

In 2016 he launched a critique of big data in biology with Ed Dougherty of Texas A&M and Peter Coveney.

In 2019, Highfield became the science director at the Science Museum Group. For the group, he wrote a series of long-form blogs about the science of COVID-19 and in 2021 organised a special COVID-19 issue of the Royal Society journal Interface Focus.

Highfield is a visiting professor of Public Engagement at the Sir William Dunn School of Pathology. He is also a visiting professor of Public Engagement at the Department of Chemistry at UCL and a member of the Medical Research Council. In April 2023, he was made the honorary president of the Association of British Science Writers, taking over from the veteran BBC correspondent Pallab Ghosh.

Highfield is a member of the Board of Longitude, a committee established by Challenge Works to govern its Longitude Prize series.

== Popular science books ==
Highfield has written and co-authored ten popular science books, and edited two written by Craig Venter, including:

- Stephen Hawking, Genius at Work: Explore his life, mind and science through the objects in his study (2024).
- Virtual You, coauthored with Peter Coveney. The Financial Times listed it as a book to read in 2023.
- The Dance of Life (2020), co-authored with Magdalena Zernicka-Goetz.
- Supercooperators (2011), co-authored with Martin Nowak. A review published in Nature by Manfred Milinski describes the book as "part autobiography, part textbook, and reads like a best-selling novel." David Willetts, in the Financial Times, described the book as an "excellent example" of using the nexus of evolutionary biology, game theory and neuroscience to understand the development of cooperation in society
- After Dolly (2006), co-authored with Ian Wilmut. Steven Poole in The Guardian describes the book as "an extremely lucid and readable explanation of the history of cloning and biologists' ideas for the future."
- The Science of Harry Potter (2002). Christine Kenneally in The New York Times describes the book as "an enjoyably indirect survey of modern science."
- The Physics of Christmas (1998); Can Reindeer Fly? (title in England). Received the world's shortest book review ("No").
- Frontiers of Complexity (1996), co-authored with Peter Coveney. Philip Warren Anderson commented that "I believe firmly, with Coveney and Highfield, that complexity is the scientific frontier".
- The Private Lives of Albert Einstein (1993), co-authored with Paul Carter. J. G. Ballard commented in a review: "In their lucid and scrupulously researched biography, Roger Highfield and Paul Carter reveal a very different Einstein. To their great credit, these startling revelations never diminish the man but only increase our sense of wonder."
- The Arrow of Time (1991), a bestseller which triggered an argument in the journal Nature, co-authored with Peter Coveney.

== Long-form journalism ==
The Mind Readers (2014). His account of the efforts to communicate with brain damaged patients that suffer disorders of consciousness was reproduced in other media worldwide, such as Gizmodo, The Week, The Independent and Pacific Standard. He has also written longer articles for Aeon, and Wired.

== Awards and honours ==
He has been listed on the Evening Standard Progress 1000 in 2012 and 2016.

In 2012, Highfield gave the Wilkins-Bernal-Medawar Lecture, on Heroes of Science, at the Royal Society.

In 2020, Highfield was elected a Fellow of the Academy of Medical Sciences.

Highfield was appointed Officer of the Order of the British Empire (OBE) in the 2022 New Year Honours for services to public engagement with science.

In 2024, Highfield was made an Honorary Fellow of the Royal Academy of Engineering.

In 2025, he delivered the Royal Society David Attenborough Prize Lecture entitled "The battle for reality" awarded for "vast contributions to public engagement with science".

== Personal life ==
Highfield met his wife, Julia Brookes, at the University of Oxford. They married in 1992 and have one son and one daughter.
