= Dai Rees (biochemist) =

British biochemist (1936–2021)

Sir Dai Rees FRS
- Born: David Allan Rees; 28 April 1936; Silloth, Cumberland, England
- Died: 10 June 2021 (aged 85)
- Education: University College of North Wales, Bangor (BSc, PhD)
- Spouse: Myfanwy Margaret Parry Owen (m. 1959)
- Awards: Colworth Medal (1970); FRS (1981)
- Scientific career
- Fields: Biochemistry
- Workplaces: University of Edinburgh; National Institute for Medical Research

Sir David Allan "Dai" Rees, FRS (28 April 1936 – 10 June 2021) was a British biochemist and science administrator who was chief executive of the Medical Research Council between 1987 and 1996.

== Early life and education ==
Rees was born in Silloth, Cumberland and educated in Wales: he attended Hawarden Grammar School and received his BSc and PhD degrees in chemistry from University College of North Wales, Bangor.

== Career ==
Rees was a lecturer in chemistry at the University of Edinburgh from 1960 until 1970, researching carbohydrate conformation and structure. He then joined Unilever, where he rose to become principal scientist. He left in 1982 to become director of the National Institute for Medical Research, and then was chief executive of the Medical Research Council from 1987 to 1996. He was president of the European Science Foundation from 1994 to1999.

== Honours and awards ==
Rees received a DSc degree from the University of Edinburgh in 1969. In 1970, Rees was awarded both the Carbohydrate Chemistry Award by the Chemical Society and the Colworth Medal by the Biochemical Society. He was elected a Fellow of the Royal Society (FRS) in 1981 and delivered the Royal Society's Philips Lecture in 1984. He was knighted in the 1993 Birthday Honours. He was an inaugural Fellow of the Academy of Medical Sciences (1998). He was one of the 58 founding fellows of the Learned Society of Wales in 2010.
