= Medawar Lecture =

Annual lecture

The Medawar Lecture was an annual lecture on the philosophy of science organised by the Royal Society of London in memory of Sir Peter Medawar. It was last delivered in 2004 after which it was merged with the Wilkins Lecture and the Bernal Lecture to form the Wilkins-Bernal-Medawar Lecture.

== List of lecturers ==
Year	Name	Lecture	Notes
1986	Karl Raimund Popper	A new interpretation of Darwinism.	—
1990	Lewis Thomas	The new transitional structure of basic science: prospects and apprehensions.	—
1992	Max Ferdinand Perutz	Species adaptation in a protein molecule.	—
1995	John Michael Ziman	Post-academic science.	—
1998	Lewis Wolpert	Is science dangerous?	—
2001	Richard Langton Gregory	Knowledge for vision: vision for knowledge.	—
2004	Peter Lipton	The truth about science	—
