= Mark Child =

British chemist

Mark Sheard Child
- Born: 17 August 1937 (age 89)
- Education: Clare College, Cambridge
- Awards: Fellow of the Royal Society
- Scientific career
- Workplaces: University of Oxford
- Thesis: The vibrational spectra of electronically degenerate molecules (1963)
- Doctoral advisor: H. Christopher Longuet-Higgins
- Doctoral students: Peter Coveney
- Website: research.chem.ox.ac.uk/mark-child.aspx

Mark Sheard Child FRS (born 17 August 1937) is a British chemist, and emeritus fellow of St Edmund Hall, Oxford.

== Education ==
Child attended Pocklington School from 1947 to 1955. He earned his Doctor of Philosophy degree from the University of Cambridge in 1963 with a thesis on The vibrational spectra of electronically degenerate molecules.

== Research ==
Child's research interests include semiclassical mechanics, Molecular collision theory, Rydberg states and Quantum Level Structures at a Saddle point.
