= Royal Fellow of the Royal Society =

A Royal Fellow of the Royal Society is a member of the British royal family who has been elected a Fellow of the Royal Society. The council of the Royal Society recommends members of the Royal Family to be elected and then the existing Fellows vote by a secret ballot whether to accept them. The ballots have only a single box to tick supporting the measure; those opposing have to write "no" or otherwise mark or spoil the paper. As of 2022 the Patron was King Charles III, and Royal Fellows were:

1. King Charles III, elected 1978
2. Anne, Princess Royal, elected 1987
3. Prince Edward, Duke of Kent, elected 1990
4. William, Prince of Wales, elected 2009

The British Monarch is always the Patron of the Royal Society, regardless of whether he/she has been previously elected a Royal Fellow. Queen Elizabeth II was elected a Royal Fellow in 1947 before she acceded to the throne in 1952. Prince Philip, Duke of Edinburgh was not a Royal Fellow as he was elected under statute 12 in 1951.

== Criticism of Royal Fellows ==
When Prince Andrew was elected in 2013 his suitability was questioned following criticism of his past business activities. Some members asked whether it was time for an institution based on science to end the practice of honouring people on the basis of a heredity principle; Professor David Colquhoun FRS said "The objects of the Royal Society are nothing to do with the monarchy, and the monarchy, on the whole, has shown absolutely no interest in science". Andrew was later stripped of his military appointments and royal patronages in 2022.

In the past, members of foreign royal families have also been elected Royal Fellows.

== Royal Fellows of the Royal Society since 1660 ==
- Ferdinand Albert I, Duke of Brunswick-Lüneburg
- Albert, Prince Consort
- Alfred, Duke of Saxe-Coburg and Gotha
- Andrew Mountbatten-Windsor (as Prince Andrew, Duke of York) (2013 to 2022)
- Anne, Princess Royal
- Prince Arthur of Connaught
- Prince Arthur, Duke of Connaught and Strathearn
- Prince Augustus Frederick, Duke of Sussex
- Charles Frederick, Grand Duke of Baden
- Charles III (as Prince of Wales)
- Christian VII of Denmark
- Christian VIII of Denmark
- Edward VII
- Edward VIII
- Prince Edward, Duke of York and Albany
- Prince Edward, Duke of Kent
- Queen Elizabeth the Queen Mother
- Elizabeth II (as Princess Elizabeth, Duchess of Edinburgh)
- Ernest Augustus, King of Hanover
- Frederick Augustus II of Saxony
- Frederick, Prince of Wales
- Prince Frederick, Duke of York and Albany
- Frederick William IV of Prussia
- George I of Great Britain
- George II of Great Britain
- George III
- George IV
- George V
- George VI
- Prince George of Denmark
- Gustaf VI Adolf of Sweden
- Prince Henry, Duke of Cumberland and Strathearn
- Prince Henry, Duke of Gloucester
- Archduke John of Austria
- Leopold I of Belgium
- Archduke Louis of Austria
- Maximilian I Joseph of Bavaria
- Archduke Maximilian of Austria–Este
- Oscar I of Sweden
- Pedro II of Brazil
- Michał Jerzy Poniatowski
- Stanisław August Poniatowski
- Prince Rupert of the Rhine
- Queen Victoria
- William IV
- William IV, Prince of Orange
- Prince William Frederick, Duke of Gloucester and Edinburgh
- Prince William Henry, Duke of Gloucester and Edinburgh
- Prince William, Duke of Cumberland
- William, Prince of Wales (as Duke of Cambridge)
