= Bernal Lecture =

Annual lecture

The Bernal Lecture was an annual lecture on the social function of science organised by the Royal Society of London and endowed by Professor John Desmond Bernal. It was last delivered in 2004, after which it was merged with the Wilkins Lecture and Medawar Lecture to form the Wilkins-Bernal-Medawar Lecture.

== List of lecturers ==
Year	Name	Lecture	Notes
1971	Eric Ashby	Science and Antiscience.	—
1974	Conrad Hal Waddington	The new Atlantis revisited.	—
1977	Piotr Leonidovich Kapitza	Scientific and social approaches for the solution of global problems.	—
1980	John Maynard Smith	Science, ideology and myth.	—
1983	John Ziman	The collectivization of science.	—
1986	Walter Bodmer	The public understanding of science.	—
1989	Walter Perry	Science and education.	—
1992	Alec Jeffreys	Molecular sleuthing: the story of DNA fingerprinting. (Sci. publ. Affairs Autumn 1993, 24.) (Delivered in 1993 in London and Keele.)	—
1995	William Stewart	UK Science and Technology policy: a perspective from the past, a vision for the future. (Sci. publ. Affairs, Spring 1996.) (Delivered in London and Dundee.)	—
1998	Tom Blundell	The networking of academic and industrial research: the UK phenomenon. (Delivered in London and York.)	—
2001	Alan Lindsay Mackay	JD Bernal: his legacy to science and to society (Delivered in London.).	—
2004	Michael Joseph Crumpton	Are low-frequency environmental fields a health hazard?	—
