= List of fellows of the Royal Society elected in 1981 =

This is a list of fellows of the Royal Society elected in 1981.

== Fellows ==
- Norman Laurence Franklin (1924–1986)
- John Guest Phillips (1933–1987)
- Dennis Frederick Evans (1928–1990)
- John Adair Barker (1925–1995)
- Michael Rex Horne (1921–2000)
- Frank Reginald Farmer (1914–2001)
- Fred Brown (1925–2004)
- Autar Singh Paintal (1925–2004)
- David John Wheeler (1927–2004)
- Sir Ian Alexander McGregor (1922–2007)
- Sir Robert William Kerr Honeycombe (1921–2007)
- Sir John McGregor Hill (1921–2008)
- Britton Chance (1913–2010)
- John Ashworth Nelder (1924–2010)
- Walter Plowright (1923–2010)
- Fraser John Bergersen (1929–2011)
- Wallace Leslie William Sargent (1935–2012)
- Ian Butterworth (1930–2013)
- Malcolm Roy Clarke (1930–2013)
- Igor Rostislavovich Shafarevich (1923–2017)
- Allan Stuart Hay (1929–2017)
- Robert Norman Clayton (1930–2017)
- Eric Albert Barnard (1927–2018)
- Peter Bradshaw (1935–2024)
- David Maurice Brink
- Brandon Carter (born 1942)
- John Horton Conway (1937–2020)
- Rex Malcolm Chaplin Dawson (1924–2021)
- Christopher Forbes Graham
- Norman Michael Green
- Herbert Gutfreund (1921–2021)
- Kenneth Charles Holmes (1934–2021)
- Yuet Wai Kan (born 1936)
- Robert Phelan Langlands (born 1936)
- Simon Hugh Piper Maddrell (1937–2020)
- Michael John O'Hara (1933–2014)
- Edward Roy Pike (1929–2025)
- Kenneth Alwyne Pounds (born 1934)
- Sir David Allan Rees (1936–2021)
- Colin Bernard Reese
- Edward Reich
- John Clayton Taylor (born 1930)
- James Dewey Watson (1928–2025)
- Steven Weinberg (1933–2021)
