= Michela Massimi =

Italian-British philosopher of science

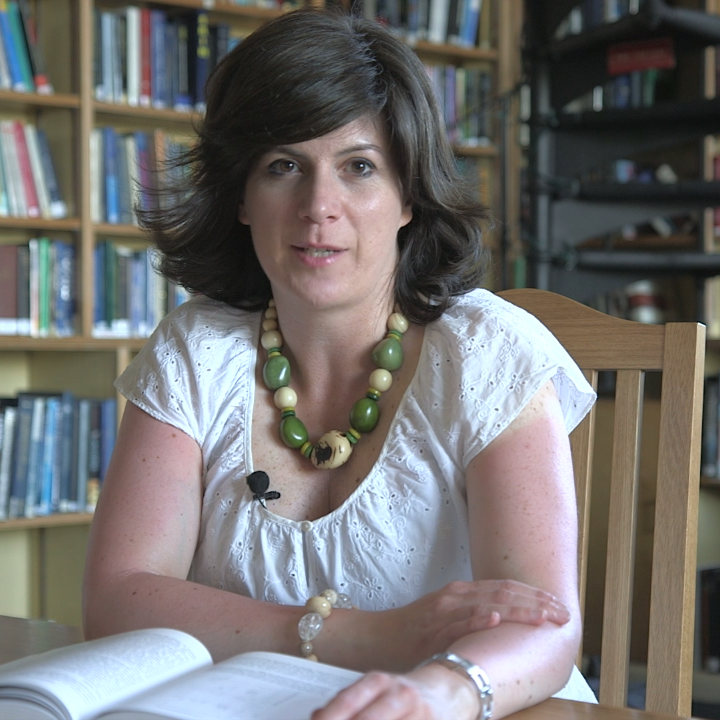
- Massimi in 2016
- Education: London School of Economics and Political Science
- Scientific career
- Fields: Philosophy of science
- Workplaces: University of Edinburgh
- Thesis: Pauli's exclusion principle : a philosophical perspective (2002)
- Doctoral advisor: Michael Redhead

Michela Massimi is an Italian and British philosopher of science. Massimi is professor of philosophy of science at the University of Edinburgh. She was Vice President of the European Philosophy of Science Association (2015-9), and President of the Philosophy of Science Association (2023-4). She has extensively published on topics such as realism in science, perspectival realism in philosophy of science, local knowledge and the philosophical-conceptual foundations of the right to participate in science.

== Education and career ==
Massimi has dual Italian and British citizenship. After studying philosophy at Sapienza University of Rome from 1993 to 1997, she completed a Ph.D. in 2002 at the London School of Economics, and after three years of postdoctoral research as a Junior Research Fellow at Girton College, Cambridge, she became a Lecturer in history and philosophy of science at University College London in 2005. She moved to the University of Edinburgh in 2012 and became professor there in 2015.

She was co-editor-in-chief of the British Journal for the Philosophy of Science from 2011 to 2016, and was President of the Philosophy of Science Association for the 2023–2024 term.

== Recognition ==
Massimi was the Wilkins–Bernal–Medawar Medalist and Lecturer of the Royal Society in 2017, speaking on "Why philosophy of science matters to science," and she won the Lakatos Award of the London School of Economics in 2023 for her 2022 book Perspectival Realism.

She was elected as Fellow of the Royal Society of Edinburgh in 2018, and as Fellow of the Royal Astronomical Society in 2019. She was also elected to the Academia Europaea in 2019.

== Books ==
Massimi is the author of Pauli’s Exclusion Principle: The Origin and Validation of a Scientific Principle (Cambridge University Press, 2005) and Perspectival Realism (Oxford University Press, 2022).

Her edited volumes include:

- Kant and Philosophy of Science Today (Cambridge University Press, 2008)
- Philosophy and the Sciences for Everyone (Routledge, 2014)
- Kant and the Laws of Nature (with Angela Breitenbach, Cambridge University Press, 2017)
- Understanding Perspectivism: Scientific Challenges and Methodological Prospects (with Casey D. McCoy, Routledge, 2019)
- Knowledge from a Human Point of View (with Ana-Maria Creţu, Springer, 2020)
- Ways of World Knowing. Local Knowledge, Coastal Communities, and Equitable Ocean Governance (with Abbe E.L. Brown, Marcel Jaspars, Oxford University Press, 2026)
