= George Hooper (artist) =

George Hooper was a British artist who worked in a unique style informed by Fauvism and the Bloomsbury Group although his style varied greatly throughout his long career. Hooper was born on 10 September 1910 in Gorakphur, India and died on 18 July 1994 in Surrey, England. During World War II He was invited to join Kenneth Clark’s Recording Britain scheme as one of a small group of artists commissioned to create works that would, “...boost morale by celebrating the country’s natural beauty and architectural heritage”. He won the Rome Prize and travelled to The British School at Rome in 1935. He taught at Brighton College of Art and works of his are in the Victoria and Albert Museum, The British Museum and a number of smaller galleries in Sussex. He spent most of his later life in Redhill in Surrey painting largely independently of any school or group of artists. He married Joyce Katherine Hooper MBE (who later founded Surrey Opera) in 1941.

== Exhibitions ==
Hooper exhibited throughout his life and posthumously and was included in the following significant exhibitions:

- 1945-7........Exhibited at Leicester Galleries, Leicester Square alongside Walter Sickert, Duncan Grant and Ivon Hitchens.
- 1953-64......Works included in seven exhibitions at Wildenstein’s, Bond Street. Also Mall Galleries and British Museum.
- 1984 & 86...Solo shows at Odette Gilbert Gallery, Cork Street.
- 1988...........Solo show for Sally Hunter, Motcomb Street.
- 1990...........Solo show, Hooper Gallery, St John’s Wood.
- 1993...........Retrospective, Charleston.
- 2003...........Solo show, Collyer Bristow.

== Bibliography ==
- George Hooper by James Beechey, The Hooper Gallery, (May 1995)
