= Michael Joseph Crumpton =

Michael Joseph Crumpton CBE, FRS (born 7 June 1929) is a British scientist who was Director of Research (Laboratories) for the Imperial Cancer Research Fund Laboratories based in London (now part of Cancer Research UK).

== Early life and education ==
Michael Joseph Crumpton was born on 7 June 1929, as the son of Charles and Edith Crumpton. He was educated at Poole Grammar School in Poole, Dorset, England, and University College Southampton (now Southampton University) and obtained a BSc from the University of London (the awarding body at the time). He then worked at the Lister Institute of Preventive Medicine, obtaining a PhD, also from London University.

From 1953 to 1955, he did National Service with the Royal Army Medical Corps.

== Career ==
From 1955 to 1960, he was a member of the scientific staff of the Microbiological Research Establishment, now part of the Defence Science and Technology Laboratory (or 'dstl' for short) based at Porton Down, near Salisbury, Wiltshire, and usually simply referred to as 'Porton Down'. From 1960–66 he was a Research Fellow in the Immunology Department of St Mary's Hospital Medical School then part of London University, now part of Imperial College.

Crumpton then joined the scientific staff at the National Institute for Medical Research based in Mill Hill, London, becoming Head of the Biochemistry Division from 1976–79 and the Cell Board from 1979–1983. The Institute moved to the new Francis Crick Institute in Camden in 2016.

Crumpton became a non-executive Director of Imperial Cancer Research Technology Ltd, part of the Imperial Cancer Research Fund from 1989–1999 and was Chief Operating Officer from 1993–94.

Crumpton was a member and later chairman of the World Health Organization’s steering committee for Polysaccharide encapsulated bacteria from 1984–1991. He has also served on many other scientific and medical committees in England, Canada and the United States.

Crumpton gave the Bernal Lecture in 2004 entitled: "Are low-frequency environmental fields a health hazard?".

== Personal life ==
In 1960 he married Janet Elizabeth Dean, and they had one son and two daughters.

Crumpton was created FRS in 1979 and was appointed a CBE in 1991. He was a founding fellow of the Academy of Medical Sciences (FMedSci) in 1998.
