= Pilgrim Trust Lecture =

Annual lecture

The Pilgrim Trust Lecture was a lecture supported by the Pilgrim Trust, organised by the Royal Society of London and the National Academy of Sciences. It was held between 1938 and 1945.

== List of lecturers ==
Year	Name	Lecture	Notes
1938	Irving Langmuir	Molecular films	—
1939	William Henry Bragg	History in the Archives of the Royal Society.	—
1940	Lawrence Joseph Henderson	Not delivered due to illness	—
1943	Karl Taylor Compton	Organization of American Scientists for the war.	—
1945	Hermann Joseph Muller	The gene.	—
