= Wilkins Lecture =

Annual lecture

The Wilkins Lecture was a lecture organised by the Royal Society of London on the subject of the history of science and named after John Wilkins, the first Secretary of the Society. The last Wilkins lecture was delivered in 2003, after which it was merged with the Bernal Lecture and the Medawar Lecture to form the Wilkins-Bernal-Medawar Lecture.

== List of recipients ==
Year	Name	Lecture	Notes
1948	John David Griffith Davies	John Wilkins and the Royal Society.	—
1949	Edward Neville da Costa Andrade	Robert Hooke.	—
1950	Francis Joseph Cole	The history of micro-dissection.	—
1952	Harold Brewer Hartley	Sir Humphry Davy, Bt, P.R.S.	—
1955	Basil Schonland	Benjamin Franklin, natural philosopher.	—
1958	Joseph Needham	The missing link in horological history: a Chinese contribution.	—
1961	Gavin Rylands de Beer	The origins of Darwins ideas on evolution and natural selection.	—
1964	Giorgio de Santillana	Galileo today.	—
1967	Geoffrey Langdon Keynes	Bacon, Harvey, and the originators of the Royal Society.	—
1970	Reginald Victor Jones	The plain story of James Watt.	—
1973	Alfred Rupert Hall	Newton and his editors.	—
1976	Margaret Gowing	Science, technology and education: England in 1870.	—
1979	Gweneth Whitteridge	On the local movement of animals.	—
1982	Sydney Smith	One hundred years after Charles Darwin.	—
1985	William Thomas Stearn	John Wilkins, John Ray and Carl Linnaeus.	—
1988	David S. Landes	Brain and hand in the development of technology of time-measurement.	—
1991	Stephen Finney Mason	Bishop John Wilkins FRS.	—
1994	Allan Chapman	Edmond Halley as a historian of science.	—
1997	Desmond George King-Hele	Erasmus Darwin, the Lunatiks and evolution.	—
2000	Roy Porter	Reflections on scientific and medical futurology since the time of John Wilkins.	—
2003	Lisa Jardine	Dr Wilkins's boy wonders.	—
