= Wilkins-Bernal-Medawar Lecture =

Annual lecture

- Awarded for: Prize lecture given on a subject relating to the history, philosophy or social function of science.
- Sponsored by: Royal Society
- Website: royalsociety.org/awards/wilkins-bernal-medawar

The Wilkins-Bernal-Medawar Lecture is a public lecture organised annually by the Royal Society of London.

It was formed in 2005 by the merger of the Wilkins Lecture, the Bernal Lecture and the Medawar Lecture. The subject matter for the lecture is some aspect of the social function of science as per the Bernal Lecture, the philosophy of science as per the Medawar Lecture or the history of science as per the Wilkins Lecture.

== List of lecturers ==
| Year | Name | Lecture | laudation | Notes |
|---|---|---|---|---|
| 2007 | Jeremy Butterfield | The uses of infinity: a philosopher looks at emergent phenomena in physics | - | |
| 2008 | Sian Ede | Hard questions : Contemporary art and the obsession with science | - | |
| 2009 | David Edgerton | The social function of history: policy, history and twentieth-century science | - | |
| 2010 | Melvyn Bragg | Notes from an Amateur: On the History of the Royal Society | - | |
| 2012 | Roger Highfield | Heroes of science | - | |
| 2015 | Hasok Chang | Who cares about the History of Science? | - | |
| 2016 | Jon Agar | The curious history of curiosity-driven research | - | |
| 2017 | Michela Massimi | Why philosophy of science matters to science | - | |
| 2018 | Mark Jackson | Life begins at 40: the biological and cultural roots of the midlife crisis | - | |
| 2019 | Simon Schaffer | Defining science through history. | - | |
| 2020 | Jim Al-Khalili | What is (Quantum) Life? | for his exceptional work in explaining complex ideas in modern physics in an approachable way, his contributions to televised histories of electricity and quantum physics, and his work ranging from very recent history of science to the history of Arabic science | |
| 2021 | June Barrow-Green | The History of Women and Maths | for her research in 19th and 20th century mathematics, notably on historical roots of modern computing, dynamical systems and the three-body problem. Her work places special emphasis on the under-representation of women in historical narratives and in contemporary mathematics. Her recent work includes decolonising of the mathematical curriculum | |
| 2022 | Philip Ball | Remaking Ourselves | for his outstanding commitments to sharing the social, cultural, and historical context of science through award-winning science communication in books, articles, and as a speaker and commentator | |
| 2023 | Sarah Franklin | Talking embryos: changing public perceptions of embryo research | for her research into, and advocacy for, the social aspects of new reproductive technologies | |
| 2024 | Matthew Cobb | | for his work documenting the history of biology as both an author and broadcaster | |
| 2025 | Sadiah Qureshi | | for the distinguished and internationally-recognised specialism in subjects related to science, race and empire, and the recent timely publication on extinction in the natural world as a relatively modern concept | |
