= Alexander L. Bond =

Canadian conservation biologist, ecologist, and curator

Alexander L. Bond, PhD
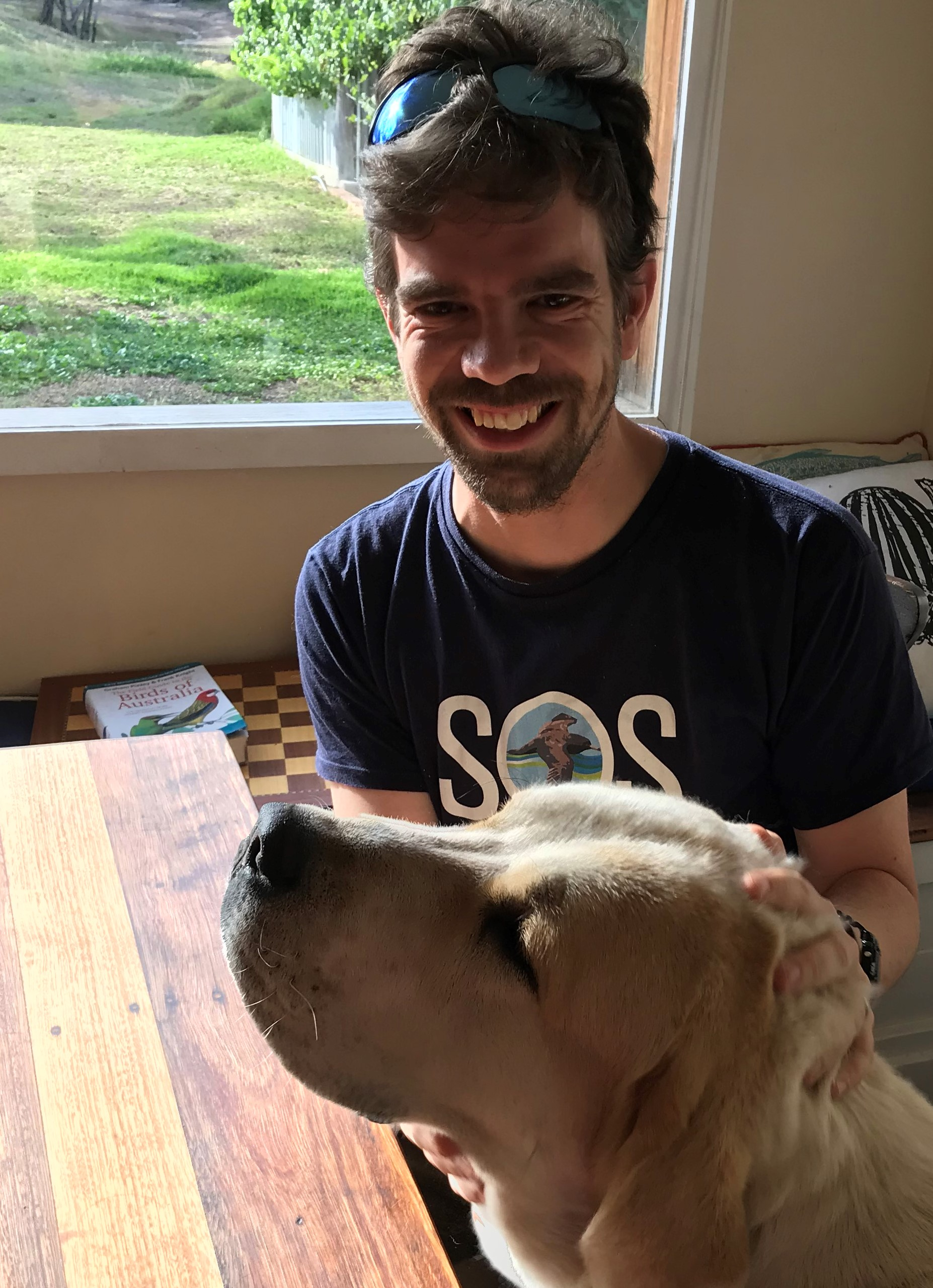
- Alex Bond in Australia in 2018 with CAO dog
- Born: Canada
- Education: Mount Allison University (B.Sc.) University of New Brunswick (M.Sc.) Memorial University of Newfoundland (Ph.D.)
- Occupations: Conservation scientist and Principal Curator at the Natural History Museum at Tring
- Employer: Natural History Museum at Tring

Alexander L. Bond (born 1982/1983) is a Canadian conservation biologist, ecologist, and curator. He holds the position of Principal Curator and Curator in Charge of Birds at the Natural History Museum at Tring. Bond is actively involved with the marine plastics pollution research group Adrift Lab. Additionally, he serves as the Ornithologist in Residence at St Nicholas Church, Leicester, a church known for its LGBTQ+-inclusive stance.

== Education ==
In 2005, Bond completed a B.Sc. with Honors in biology from Mount Allison University, during which he published a thesis titled Daytime spring migrations of scoters (Melanitta spp.) in the Bay of Fundy. Subsequently, he pursued a M.Sc at the University of New Brunswick, completing his studies in 2007. His thesis was entitled Patterns of mercury burden in the seabird community of Machias Seal Island, New Brunswick. Bond completed a Ph.D. in 2011 at Memorial University of Newfoundland, with a doctoral thesis titled Relationships between oceanography and the demography & foraging of auklets (Charadriiformes, Alcidae: Aethia; Merrem 1788) in the Aleutian Islands.

== Career ==
Bond is a conservation biologist with expertise in marine ecology and island biology. His research interests encompass conservation, contaminants, invasive species, plastic pollution, seabird ecology, and stable isotopes. From 2011 to 2013, Bond held a Natural Sciences and Engineering Research Council of Canada (NSERC) post-doctoral fellowship at the University of Saskatchewan. From 2013 to 2014, he served as a visiting fellow at Environment and Climate Change Canada under the NSERC program. Following that, he held the position of senior conservation scientist at the Centre for Conservation Science of the Royal Society for the Protection of Birds from 2014 to 2017. Additionally, he served as an adjunct professor at the University of Saskatchewan School of Environment and Sustainability from 2014 to 2019. Until 2023, he held the position of honorary researcher at the Institute for Marine and Antarctic Studies located in Tasmania, Australia. Bond holds the position of senior curator of birds in the department of life sciences at the Natural History Museum at Tring.

Since 2012, Bond has served as a subject editor for Avian Conservation and Ecology, and he assumed the role of editor-in-chief in 2019.

In 2020, Bond and Beth Montague-Hellen were jointly awarded the Royal Society Athena Prize for their contributions to LGBTQ+ representation in STEM fields. In 2020, he participated in the inaugural QatCanSTEM colloquium at Dalhousie University in Canada. In 2022, Bond was awarded the Marsh Award in Ornithology.

Bond is widely recognized for his research on plastic pollution in oceans, particularly focusing on the health impacts it has on seabirds. This research has led to the identification of a novel condition known as plasticosis, characterized by scarring of the digestive tracts of seabirds due to the ingestion of plastic waste, also referred to as plastic-induced fibrosis.
