= Philips Lecture =

Annual lecture in the UK

The Philips Lecture was a lecture organised by the Royal Society of London with support from Philips Industries Limited in 1980, the object being to strengthen contacts between the Society and industry and more generally between universities and industry. The general theme of the series was science in industry. The lecture was annual and was given for the last time in 1992.

== List of lecturers ==
Year	Name	Lecture	Notes
1981	Alfred Spinks	Targets in biotechnology.	—
1982	James Whyte Black	The uncertain road to modern medicines.	—
1983	Geoffrey Allen	The impact of industrial and academic collaboration on new technology.	—
1984	David Allan Rees	Renewing the role of research establishments.	—
1985	John Ivan George Cadogan	Research, business and the universities.	—
1986	Frank Brian Mercer	Critical aspects of industrial and academic collaboration.	—
1987	Hendrik Brugt Gerhard Casimir	Magnetism.	—
1988	Robin Buchanan Nicholson	Industrial research: success and failure.	—
1989	Cyril Hilsum	Does industrial R&D pay?	—
1990	Alastair Pilkington	Glass and windows.	—
1991	S van Houten	Why industrial research?	—
1992	C. Thomas Elliott	Thermal imaging: a new eye on the world.	—
