= Pilgrim Trust =

British charitable trust

The Pilgrim Trust is an independent charitable grant-making trust in the United Kingdom. The Trust's aims are to improve the life chances of the most vulnerable and preserve the best of the past for the public to enjoy. The Trust awards approximately £3 million worth of grants each year to charities which are working to preserve the UK’s heritage and social change. It is based in London and is a registered charity (no. 206603) under English law.

It was founded in 1930 with a two million pound endowment by Edward Harkness, an American philanthropist. The trust's inaugural board were Stanley Baldwin, Sir James Irvine, Sir Josiah Stamp, John Buchan and Hugh Macmillan; its first secretary was former civil servant, Thomas Jones.

== Founding ==
Edward Harkness was an American philanthropist, whose family traced its roots to Dumfriesshire and who retained a lifelong love of Great Britain. Prompted by admiration for the UK's contribution to the First World War, and recognising the difficulties of its people during the Great Depression, he donated £2 million to create the Pilgrim Trust.

The preamble to the trust deed was written by John Buchan, and reads:

Whereas it is acknowledged by all the Great Britain in the War spent her resources freely in the common cause and in the years which have elapsed since Peace has sustained honourably and without complaint a burden which has gravely increased the difficulties of life for her people; And whereas the Donor feels himself bound by many ties of affection to the land from which he draws his descent and desires to show his admiration for what Great Britain has done by a gift to be used for some of her more urgent needs; And whereas he hopes that such a gift wisely applied may assist not only in tiding over the present time of difficulty but in promoting her future well-being...

== Highlights from history ==
=== Recording Britain ===
In 1940 the Trust funded a scheme "Recording the changing face of Britain" established by the Committee for the Employment of Artists in Wartime, part of the Ministry of Labour and National Service. Led by Sir Kenneth Clark, director of the National Gallery, it employed artists to record the home front in Britain, running until 1943. It was motivated by a desire to record and reflect the landscape, already undergoing a period of rapid change through urbanisation and changes in agriculture and further threatened by bombing and other effects of war. Some of the sixty three artists directly commissioned included John Piper, Sir William Russell Flint, Charles Knight, Malvina Cheek, George Hooper, Clifford Ellis, Raymond Teague Cowern and Rowland Hilder. A further thirty four artists contributed to the final total of over 1500 works. The collection was donated to the Victoria and Albert Museum by the Trust in 1949. Over a hundred works comprising the "Recording Scotland" part of the same scheme are held at the Museum Collections Unit, University of St Andrews.

=== The National Cataloguing Scheme ===
In 2006, the Trust partnered with the Esmee Fairbairn Foundation and The National Archives to support the cataloguing of important archives to which people had little or no access. In the pilot year, 12 grants were awarded and it was deemed a success. The Pilgrim Trust continued this grant programme with The National Archives and in 2017 renamed the grant programme to Archives Revealed. In 2021, the Wolfson Foundation partnered with the Pilgrim Trust and The National Archives to continue Archives Revealed and a total of £1 million went towards 'the only funding stream in the UK dedicated to cataloguing and unlocking archives'.

In 2024 the Archives Revealed programme was expanded with a £5m investment from the National Lottery Heritage Fund.

== The Pilgrim Trust today ==
Today, the Trust makes grants of roughly £3 million in grants to charities and other public bodies that focus on preserving the UK's heritage or on bringing about social change. It also funds activities such as research and advocacy that catalyse wider structural changes.

Today, the Trust's main areas of operation are providing grants for young women's mental health; preserving and conserving significant historic buildings, structures, objects, works of art, collections and records; and researching, advocating and developing work in their areas/sectors of interest.

== Trustees ==
As of 2026, the trustees of the Trust are:

- James Sassoon (chairman)
- David Barrie CBE
- Dr Anna Keay OBE
- Alice La Trobe Weston
- Atul Patel MBE
- Matthew Ridley
- Marie Staunton CBE
- Dr Alexander Sturgis CBE
- Cullagh Warnock
- Joan Winterkorn

== See also ==
- Pilgrim Trust Lecture
