= Beth Montague-Hellen =

Head of Library & Information Services at the Francis Crick Institute

Elizabeth H. B. Montague-Hellen is the Head of Library & Information Services at the Francis Crick Institute, London known for her work supporting researchers and with the LGBTQ+ STEM organisation.

== Education ==
Montague-Hellen received a BSc in Molecular Biology with Industrial Experience at the University of Manchester in 2004. She then went on to receive an MRes Bioinformatics at the University of York in 2005. Montague-Hellen completed a Ph.D. in bioinformatics at the Brighton & Sussex Medical School. Her thesis was titled Identification of co-regulated candidate genes by promoter analysis. She later earned an MSc in Digital Library Management from the University of Sheffield in 2017.

== Career ==
Montague-Hellen worked in bioinformatics and evolution before switching into the field of Digital Library Management. She has worked as a Research Services Librarian at the University of Sheffield, a Systems Librarian at Bishop Grosseteste University, and a Senior Research Librarian at the University of Nottingham. In 2014 she did a year of postdoctoral research at Rutgers University. She is currently the Head of Library & Information Systems at the Francis Crick Institute.

Beth has spent much of her career supporting efforts to ensure researchers are fully supported in their work and in their work-life balance. Between 2013 and 2015 she co-convened a twitter based global support group for early career researchers called #ECRChat

When she was a post-doctoral fellow at the University of Sheffield, Montague-Hellen organized a group of LGBT scientists she knew through Twitter together for networking. That group had its first LGBT STEMinar in 2016 and a second in 2017.

In 2024 Montague-Hellen published her first book, drawing on her experience of equality and diversity initiatives within the library sector. The book, Practical Tips for Equality, Diversity and Inclusion in Libraries, includes practical tips and guidance for libraries and librarians on inclusive policy, environment, spaces and services, and has received praise for its clarity, writing style and usefulness.

== Awards ==
Montague-Hellen is the co-founder, with Alex Bond, of LGBTQ+STEM. In 2020, Montague-Hellen and Bond were jointly awarded the Royal Society Athena Prize for their work with LGBTQ+STEM, a project "that helps LGBTQ+ researchers to find their place within science."

In 2023 Montague-Hellen was named as one of the Chartered Institute of Library and Information Professionals 125 award recipients, honoring the next generation of leaders in Libraries.

== Personal life ==
Montague-Hellen lives in Sheffield with her wife, Kate Montague-Hellen. She is the grand-niece of Ruth and Charles Cranfield.
