= John Ziman =

New Zealand physicist (1925–2005)

- Born: 16 May 1925; Cambridge, England
- Died: 2 January 2005 (aged 79)
- Spouses: Rosemary Dixon; Joan Solomon
- Awards: Fellow of the Royal Society (1967)
- Scientific career
- Workplaces: University of Bristol, University of Oxford, Victoria University of Wellington, University of Cambridge

John Michael Ziman (16 May 1925 – 2 January 2005) was a British-born New Zealand physicist and humanist who worked in the area of condensed matter physics. He was a spokesman for science, as well as a teacher and author.

Ziman was born in Cambridge, England, in 1925. His parents were Solomon Netheim Ziman and, Nellie Frances, née Gaster. The family emigrated to New Zealand when Ziman was a baby. He obtained his early education at Hamilton High School and the Victoria University College. He obtained his PhD from Balliol College, Oxford and did his early research on the theory of electrons in liquid metals at the University of Cambridge.

In 1964, he was appointed professor of theoretical physics at University of Bristol, where he wrote his Elements Of Advanced Quantum Theory (1969) which explains the rudiments of quantum field theory with an elementary condensed matter slant. During this period, his interests shifted towards the philosophy of science. He argued about the social dimension of science, and the social responsibility of scientists in numerous essays and books.

He married twice, to Rosemary Dixon in 1951 and secondly to Joan Solomon. He had four children, of which one predeceased him.

== See also ==
- Nearly free electron model

== Selected publications ==
- Ziman, John (1960). Electrons and phonons: The theory of transport phenomena in solids. Clarendon. ISBN 978-0-19-850779-6.
- Ziman, John (1963). Electrons in metals: A short guide to the Fermi surface. Taylor & Francis. OCLC 13129448.
- Ziman, John (1968). Public Knowledge: Essay Concerning the Social Dimension of Science. Cambridge University Press. ISBN 978-0-521-06894-9.
- Ziman, John (1969). Elements Of Advanced Quantum Theory. Cambridge University Press. ISBN 978-0-521-09949-3.
- Ziman, John (1972). Principles of the Theory of Solids. Cambridge University Press. ISBN 978-0-521-29733-2.
- Ziman, John (1976). The Force of Knowledge: The Scientific Dimension of Society. Cambridge University Press. ISBN 978-0-521-09917-2.
- Ziman, John (1978). Reliable Knowledge: an Exploration of the Grounds for Belief in Science. Cambridge University Press. ISBN 978-0-521-40670-3.
- Ziman, John (1979). Models of Disorder. Cambridge University Press. ISBN 978-0-521-29280-1.
- An Introduction to Science Studies: The Philosophical and Social Aspects of Science and Technology, Cambridge: Cambridge University Press, 1987, ISBN 978-0-521-34680-1
- Ziman, John (1994). Prometheus Bound: Science in a dynamic steady state. Cambridge University Press. ISBN 978-0-521-43430-0.
- Ziman, John (1995). Of one mind: the collectivization of science. AIP Press (American Institute of Physics). ISBN 978-1-56396-065-9.
- Ziman, John (2000). Real Science: What It Is and What It Means. Cambridge University Press. ISBN 978-0-521-77229-7.
