= Tercentenary Lectures =

The Tercentenary Lectures were a series of lectures held during the 300th anniversary year of the Royal Society, London in 1960.

== List of lecturers ==
Name	Lecture	Notes
C. D. Darlington	The chromosomes and the theory of heredity.	—
Arnold Alexander Hall	Trends in aeronautical science and engineering.	—
Christopher Hinton	The evolution of nuclear power plant design.	—
Alan Lloyd Hodgkin	The physics and chemistry of nervous conduction.	—
Dorothy Hodgkin	Molecules in crystals.	—
Bernard Lovell	The investigation of the Universe by radio astronomy.	—
Peter Medawar	The problems of transplantation.	—
C. F. Powell	The study of nuclear interactions at very great energies.	—
Alexander R. Todd	New horizons in organic chemistry.	—
Vincent Wigglesworth	The metamorphosis of insects.	—
