= Peter Lipton =

American philosopher

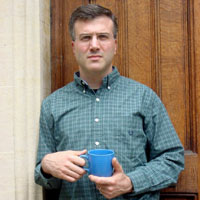
- Peter Lipton
- Born: October 9, 1954; New York City, U.S.
- Died: November 25, 2007 (age 53); Cambridge, England

Education
- Education: Wesleyan University; New College, Oxford

Philosophical work
- Era: Contemporary philosophy
- Region: Western philosophy
- School: Analytic philosophy Scientific realism
- Institutions: Clark University; Williams College; University of Cambridge
- Main interests: Philosophy of science, epistemology
- Notable ideas: Contrastive explanation Inference to the loveliest explanation The prediction–accommodation distinction

Peter Lipton (October 9, 1954 – November 25, 2007) was an American philosopher. He was the Hans Rausing Professor and Head of the Department of History and Philosophy of Science at Cambridge University, and a fellow of King's College, until his death in November 2007. According to his obituary on the Cambridge website, he was "recognized as one of the leading philosophers of science and epistemologists in the world."

== Career ==
Lipton was an undergraduate at Wesleyan University and a graduate student at Oxford University. Before coming to Cambridge, he taught at Clark University and Williams College. He was a member of the Nuffield Council on Bioethics and chaired the working party that produced Pharmacogenetics: Ethical Issues. He was also on the AskPhilosophers panel. In 2004, Lipton had the honour of being the Medawar Prize Lecturer of the Royal Society.

Lipton's research interests focused on the philosophy of science, including topics such as explanation, inference, testing, theory change, laws of nature, and scientific realism. Lipton's research in philosophy of science led him to do work in other related areas of philosophy; in epistemology, Lipton also investigated the philosophy of induction and testimony. Likewise in philosophy of mind Lipton researched notions of mental content and the mind–body problem.

He was a member of the Nuffield Council on Bioethics (2003–2007) and was elected a Fellow of the Academy of Medical Sciences in 2006.

== Personal life ==
Lipton lived with his wife Diana and two sons Jonah and Jacob. He was a self-confessed "religious atheist" and "progressive Jew"; he held that he could follow the customs and culture of a Jewish lifestyle, and use the teachings of Judaism to help him tackle moral problems in life, without simultaneously believing in the metaphysics of such a religion (such as the existence of God).

On 25 November 2007, Lipton suffered a fatal heart attack after playing a game of squash. He was succeeded in his capacity as Head of Department of History and Philosophy of Science at the University of Cambridge by John Forrester.

== Selected publications ==
- "Wouldn't It Be Lovely: Explanation and Scientific Realism", Metascience 14, 3 (2006) 331-361. (Review Symposium on the second edition of Inference to the Best Explanation, with James Ladyman, Igor Douven and Bas van Fraassen.)
- "Science and Religion: The Immersion Solution", in Andrew Moore & Michael Scott (eds) Realism and Religion: Philosophical and Theological Perspectives (Ashgate, forthcoming).
- "Waiting for Hume", in Marina Frasca-Spada & P.J.E. Kail (eds) Impressions of Hume, Oxford University Press, 2005, 59-76.
- "The Truth about Science", Philosophical Transactions of the Royal Society B 360 (2005), 1259-1269.
- "Testing Hypotheses: Prediction and Prejudice", Science 307 (14 January 2005), 219-221.
- Inference to the Best Explanation, Routledge, 1991; expanded second edition, 2004. ISBN 0-415-24202-9.
- "Epistemic Options", Philosophical Studies 121 (2004) 147-158.
- "What Good is an Explanation?", in G. Hon & S. Rackover (eds.), Explanation: Theoretical Approaches, Kluwer, 2001, 43-59. Reprinted in J. Cornwell (ed.) Understanding Explanation, Oxford University Press, 2004, 1-22.
- "Genetic and Generic Determinism: A New Threat to Free Will?", in D. Rees and S. Rose (eds.) Perils and Prospects of the New Brain Sciences (CUP, 2004).
- "The Reach of the Law", Philosophical Books, 43, 4, October 2002, 254-260.
- "Quests of a Realist", Metascience, 10, 3 (2001), 347-353.
- "The History of Empiricism", International Encyclopedia of the Social and Behavioural Sciences, Pergamon, 2001, 4481-4485.
- "Is Explanation a Guide to Inference?", in G. Hon and S. Rackover (eds.), Explanation: Theoretical Approaches, Kluwer, 2001, 93-120.
- "Inference to the Best Explanation", in W.H. Newton-Smith (ed.), A Companion to the Philosophy of Science, Blackwell, 2000, 184-193.
- "Tracking Track Records", Proceedings of the Aristotelian Society, Supplementary Volume LXXIV (2000), 179-205.
- "The Epistemology of Testimony", Studies in the History and Philosophy of Science 29A (1998), 1-31.
- "All Else Being Equal", Philosophy 74 (1999), 155-168.
- "Binding the Mind", in J. Cornwell (ed.), Consciousness and Human Identity, Oxford University Press, 1998, 212-224.
- "Cambridge Contributions to the Philosophy of Science", in S. Ormrod (ed.), Cambridge Contributions, Cambridge University Press, 1998, 122-142.
- "Is the Best Good Enough?", Proceedings of the Aristotelian Society XCIII (1993), 89-104; reprinted in D. Papineau (ed.), Philosophy of Science, Oxford Readings in Philosophy, Oxford University Press, 1996.
- "Popper and Reliabilism", in A. O"Hear (ed.), Karl Popper: Philosophy and Problems, Royal Institute of Philosophy, Cambridge University Press, 1995, 31-43.
- "Making a Difference", Philosophica, Vol. 51, No. 1, 1993, 39-54. Reprinted in Revue Roumaine de Philosophie, 38, 3.4, 1994, 291-303.
- "Contrastive Explanation", in D. Knowles (ed.), Explanation and its Limits, Cambridge University Press, 1990, 247-266; reprinted in D. Ruben (ed.), Explanation, Oxford Readings in Philosophy, Oxford University Press, 1993.
- "Causation Outside the Law", in H. Gross & T. R. Harrison (eds.), Jurisprudence: Cambridge Essays, Oxford University Press, 1992, 127-148.
