= Fellow of the Royal Society =

Award by the Royal Society of London

Fellowship of the Royal Society
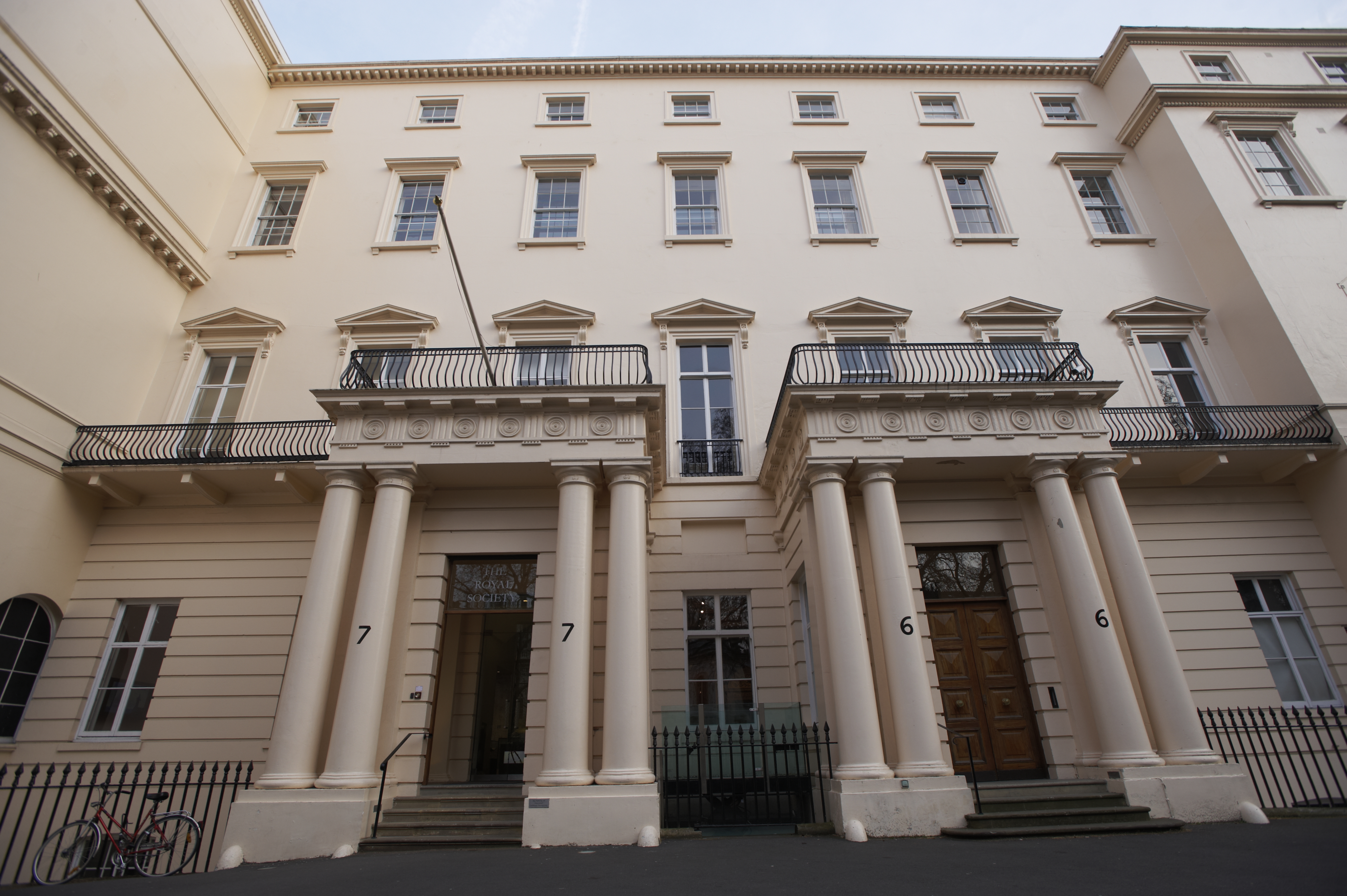
- Headquarters of the Royal Society in Carlton House Terrace in London
- Awarded for: "Contributions to the improvement of natural knowledge"
- Sponsored by: Royal Society
- Date: 1663; 363 years ago
- Location: London
- Country: United Kingdom
- Total no. Fellows: Approximately 8,000 (1,743 living Fellows)

Fellowship of the Royal Society (FRS, ForMemRS and HonFRS) is an award granted by the Fellows of the Royal Society of London to individuals who have made a "substantial contribution to the improvement of natural knowledge, including mathematics, engineering science, and medical science".

== Overview ==
Fellowship of the Society, the oldest known scientific academy in continuous existence, has been awarded to around 8,000 fellows. These include eminent scientists Isaac Newton (1672), Benjamin Franklin (1756), Charles Darwin (1839), Ernest Rutherford (1903), Srinivasa Ramanujan (1918), Jagadish Chandra Bose (1920), Albert Einstein (1921), Paul Dirac (1930), Subrahmanyan Chandrasekhar (1944), Dorothy Hodgkin (1947), Alan Turing (1951), Lise Meitner (1955), Satyendra Nath Bose (1958), and others. Over 280 Nobel Laureates have been inducted since 1900. As of October 2018, there were approximately 1,689 living fellows, foreign members and honorary members, of whom 85 were Nobel laureates.

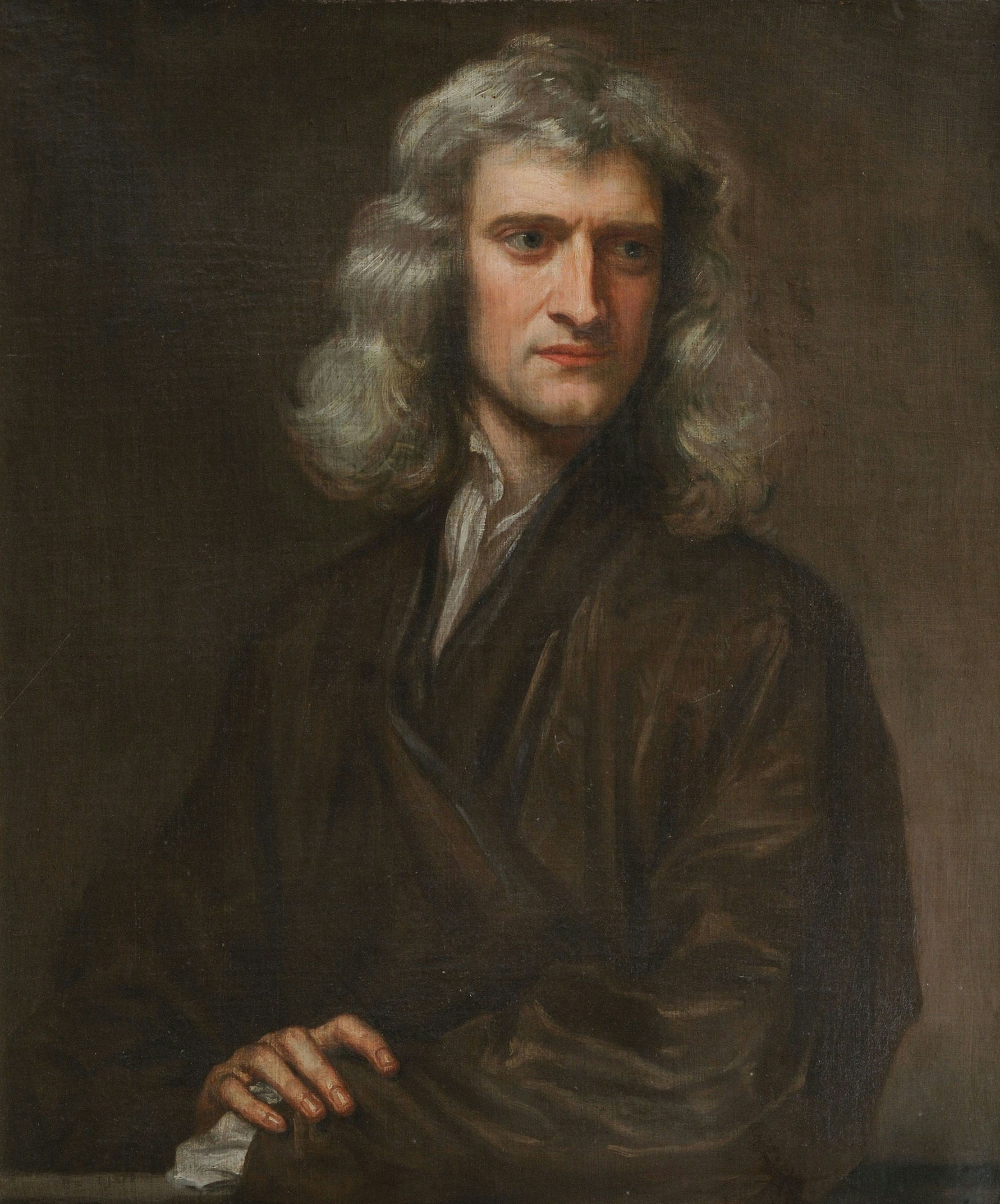
Elected in 1672, Isaac Newton was one of the earliest fellows of the Royal Society.

Fellowship of the Royal Society has been described by The Guardian as "the equivalent of a lifetime achievement Oscar."

== Fellowships ==
Up to 60 new fellows (FRS), honorary (HonFRS) and foreign members (ForMemRS) are elected annually in late April or early May, from a pool of around 700 proposed candidates each year. New fellows can be nominated only by existing fellows for one of the fellowships described below:

=== Fellow ===
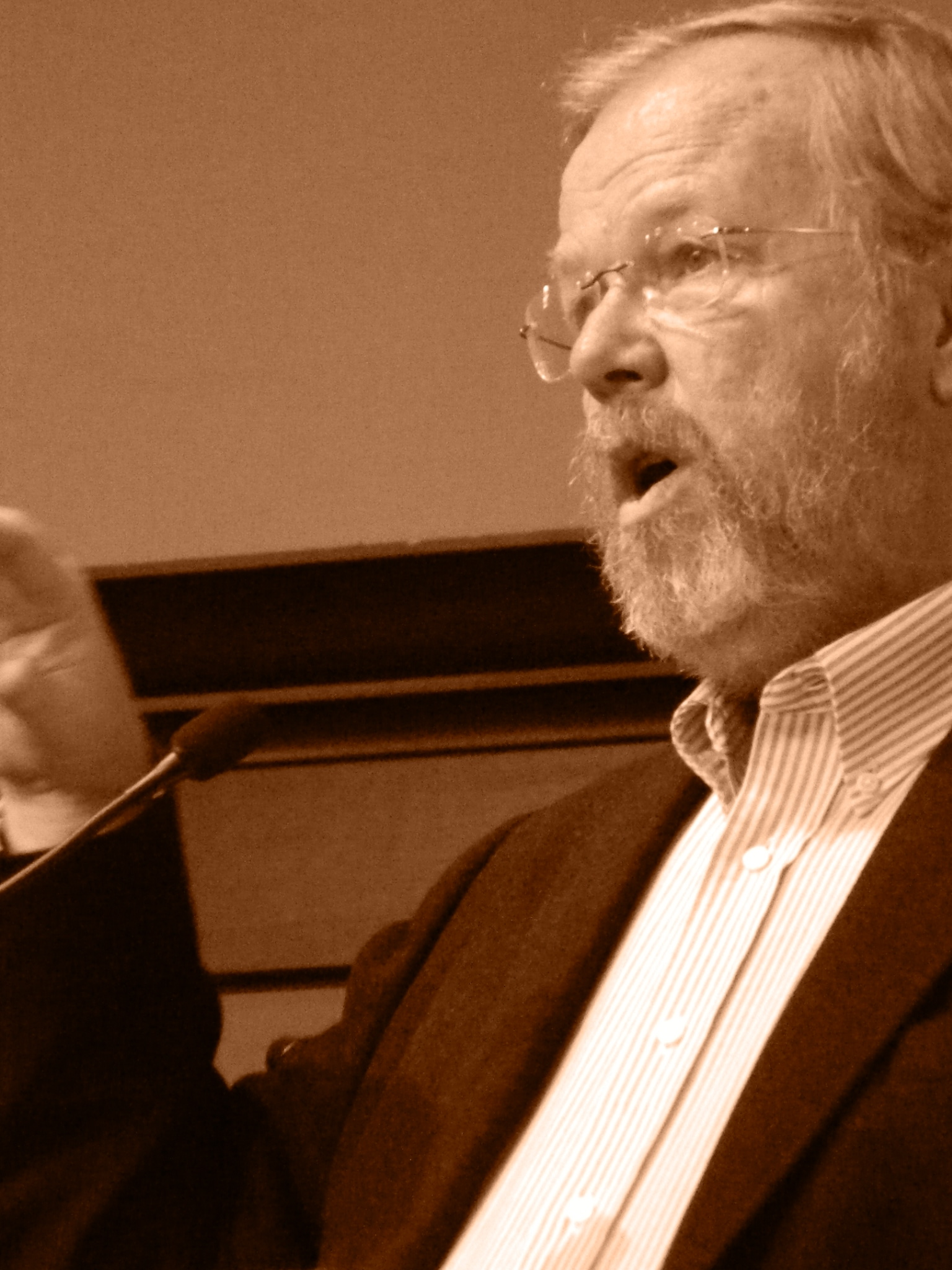
Bill Bryson, elected as an honorary member in 2013

Every year, up to 52 new fellows are elected from the United Kingdom, the rest of the Commonwealth of Nations, and Ireland, which make up around 90% of the society. Each candidate is considered on their merits and can be proposed from any sector of the scientific community. Fellows are elected for life on the basis of excellence in science and are entitled to use the post-nominal letters FRS.

=== Foreign member ===
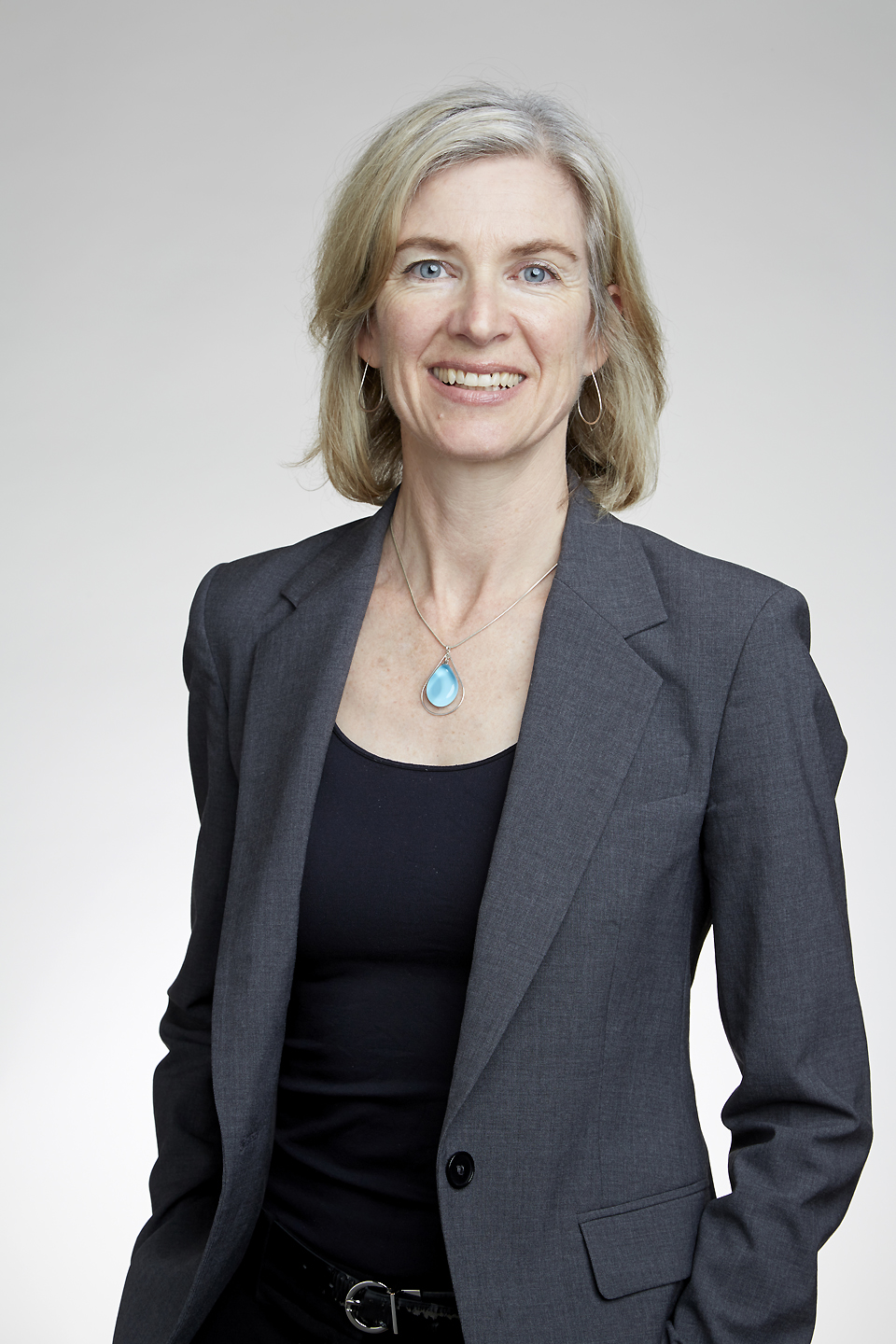
Jennifer Doudna, elected as a foreign member in 2016

Every year, fellows elect up to ten new foreign members. Like fellows, foreign members are elected for life through peer review on the basis of excellence in science. As of 2016, there are around 165 foreign members, who are entitled to use the post-nominal ForMemRS.

=== Honorary fellow ===
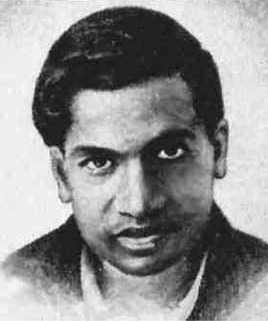
Ramanujan was elected a fellow in 1918.

Honorary fellowship is an honorary academic title awarded to candidates who have given distinguished service to the cause of science, but do not have the kind of scientific achievements required of fellows or foreign members. Honorary Fellows include the World Health Organization's Director-General Tedros Adhanom Ghebreyesus (2022), Bill Bryson (2013), Melvyn Bragg (2010), Robin Saxby (2015), David Sainsbury, Baron Sainsbury of Turville (2008), Onora O'Neill (2007), John Maddox (2000), Patrick Moore (2001) and Lisa Jardine (2015). Honorary Fellows are entitled to use the post nominal letters HonFRS.

=== Former statute 12 fellowships ===
Statute 12 is a legacy mechanism for electing members before official honorary membership existed in 1997. Fellows elected under statute 12 include David Attenborough (1983) and John Palmer, 4th Earl of Selborne (1991).

=== Royal Fellow ===
The Council of the Royal Society can recommend members of the British royal family for election as Royal Fellow of the Royal Society. As of 2023 there are four royal fellows:

1. Charles III, elected 1978
2. Anne, Princess Royal, elected 1987
3. Prince Edward, Duke of Kent, elected 1990
4. William, Prince of Wales, elected 2009

Elizabeth II was not a Royal Fellow, but provided her patronage to the society, as all reigning British monarchs have done since Charles II of England. Prince Philip, Duke of Edinburgh (1951) was elected under statute 12, not as a Royal Fellow.

== Election of new fellows ==
The election of new fellows is announced annually in May, after their nomination and a period of peer-reviewed selection.

=== Nomination ===
Each candidate for Fellowship or Foreign Membership is nominated by two Fellows of the Royal Society (a proposer and a seconder), who sign a certificate of proposal. Previously, nominations required at least five fellows to support each nomination by the proposer, which was criticised for supposedly establishing an old boy network and elitist gentlemen's club. The certificate of election (see for example) includes a statement of the principal grounds on which the proposal is being made. There is no limit on the number of nominations made each year. In 2015, there were 654 candidates for election as Fellows and 106 candidates for Foreign Membership.

=== Selection ===
The Council of the Royal Society oversees the selection process and appoints 10 subject area committees, known as Sectional Committees, to recommend the strongest candidates for election to the Fellowship. The final list of up to 52 Fellowship candidates and up to 10 Foreign Membership candidates is confirmed by the Council in April, and a secret ballot of Fellows is held at a meeting in May. A candidate is elected if they secure two-thirds of votes of those Fellows voting.

An indicative allocation of 18 Fellowships can be allocated to candidates from Physical Sciences and Biological Sciences; and up to 10 from Applied Sciences, Human Sciences and Joint Physical and Biological Sciences. A further maximum of six can be 'Honorary', 'General' or 'Royal' Fellows. Nominations for Fellowship are peer reviewed by Sectional Committees, each with at least 12 members and a Chair (all of whom are Fellows of the Royal Society). Members of the 10 Sectional Committees change every three years to mitigate in-group bias. Each Sectional Committee covers different specialist areas including:

1. Computer science
2. Mathematics
3. Astronomy and physics
4. Chemistry
5. Engineering
6. Earth science and environmental science
7. Molecules of Life
8. Cell biology
9. Multicellular organisms
10. Patterns in Populations

=== Admission ===
New Fellows are admitted to the Society at a formal admissions day ceremony held annually in July, when they sign the Charter Book and the Obligation which reads: "We who have hereunto subscribed, do hereby promise, that we will endeavour to promote the good of the Royal Society of London for Improving Natural Knowledge, and to pursue the ends for which the same was founded; that we will carry out, as far as we are able, those actions requested of us in the name of the Council; and that we will observe the Statutes and Standing Orders of the said Society. Provided that, whensoever any of us shall signify to the President under our hands, that we desire to withdraw from the Society, we shall be free from this Obligation for the future".

Since 2014, portraits of Fellows at the admissions ceremony have been published without copyright restrictions in Wikimedia Commons under a more permissive Creative Commons license which allows wider re-use.

== Research fellowships and other awards ==
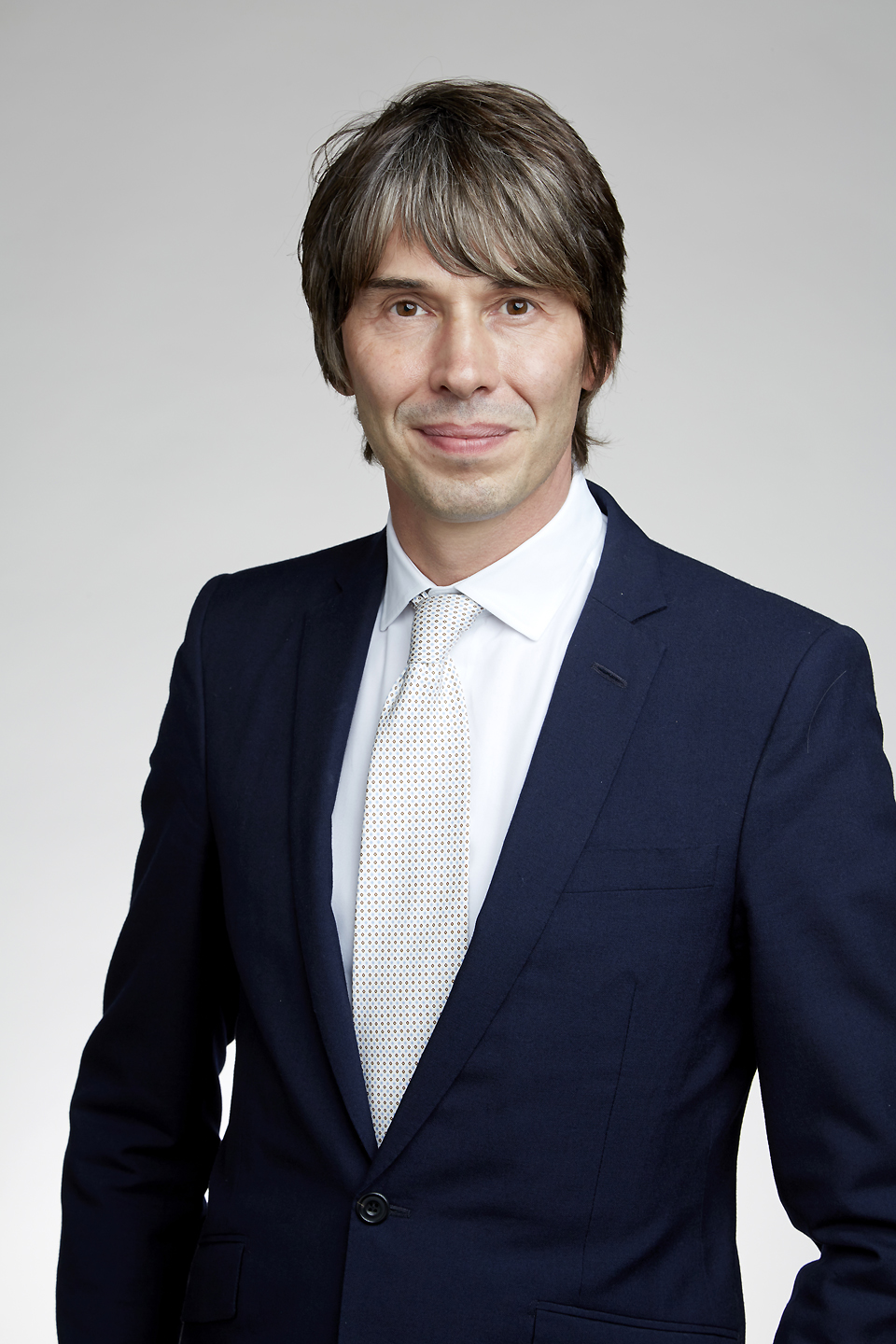
Brian Cox, a professor of physics, was elected a fellow of the Royal Society in 2016 having previously held a Royal Society University Research Fellowship (URF) from 2005 to 2013.

In addition to the main fellowships of the Royal Society (FRS, ForMemRS & HonFRS), other fellowships are available which are applied for by individuals, rather than through election. These fellowships are research grant awards and holders are known as Royal Society Research Fellows.

- University research fellowships (URFs): Royal Society University Research Fellowships are for outstanding scientists in the UK who are in the early stages of their research career and have the potential to become leaders in their field. Previous holders of URFs to have been elected FRS at a later date include Richard Borcherds (1994), Jean Beggs (1998), Frances Ashcroft (1999), Athene Donald (1999) and John Pethica (1999). More recent awardees include Terri Attwood, Sarah-Jayne Blakemore, Brian Cox, Sarah Bridle, Shahn Majid, Tanya Monro, Beth Shapiro, David J. Wales and Katherine Willis.
- Royal Society Leverhulme Trust senior research fellowships are for scientists who would benefit from a period of full-time research without teaching and administrative duties, supported by the Leverhulme Trust.
- Newton advanced fellowships provide established international researchers with an opportunity to develop the research strengths and capabilities of their research group. These are provided by the Newton Fund as part of the UK's official development assistance.
- Industry fellowships are for academic scientists who want to work on a collaborative project with industry, and for scientists in industry who want to work on a collaborative project with an academic organisation.
- Dorothy Hodgkin fellowships are for outstanding scientists in the UK at an early stage of their research career who require a flexible working pattern due to personal circumstances. These fellowships are named after Dorothy Hodgkin.

In addition to the award of Fellowship (FRS, HonFRS & ForMemRS) and the Research Fellowships described above, several other awards, lectures and medals of the Royal Society are also given.

== See also ==
- Royal Society
- Royal Fellow of the Royal Society
