= Department for Science, Innovation and Technology =

Ministerial department of the UK Government

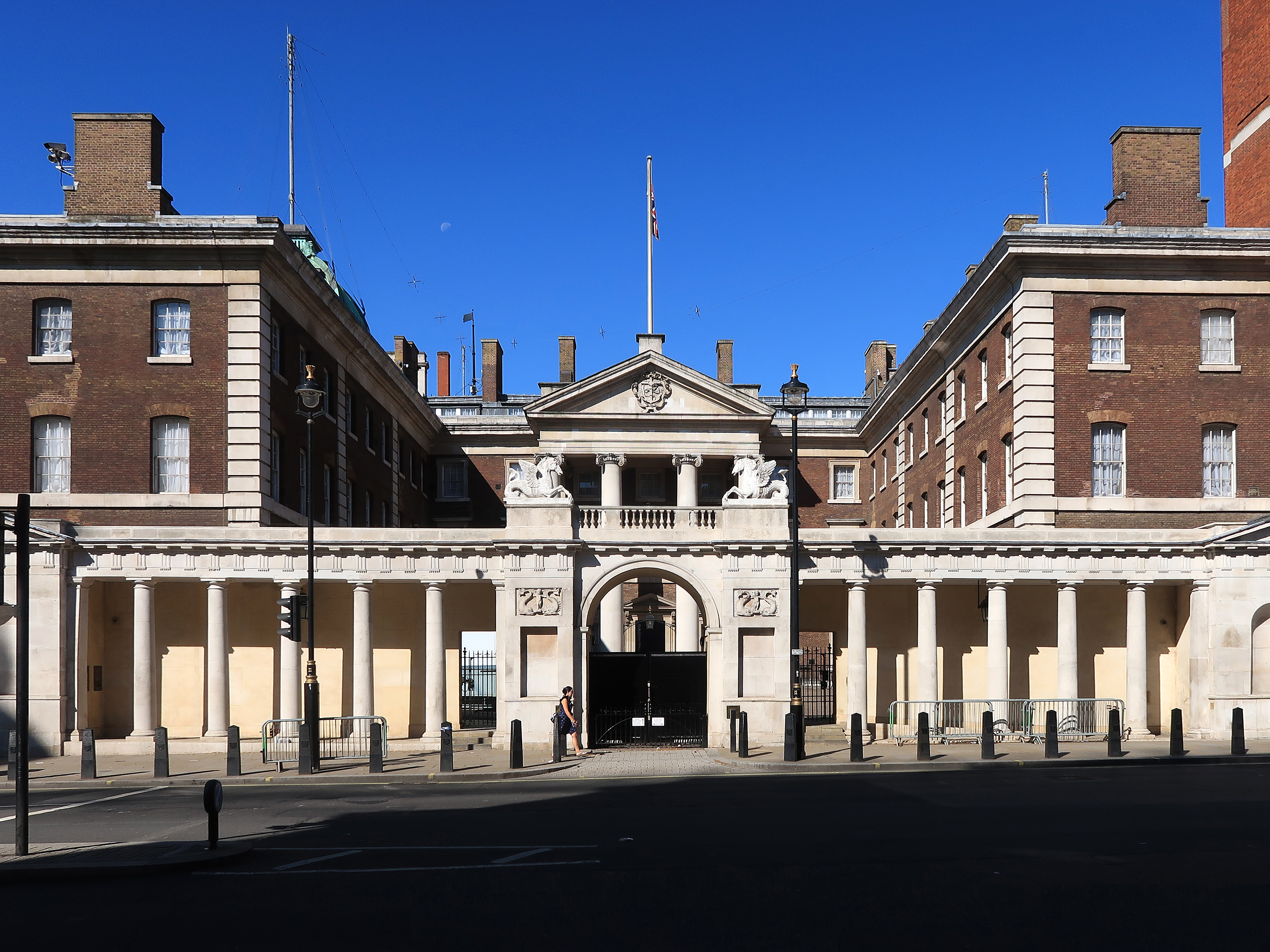
- 22-26 Whitehall in Westminster

Department overview
- Formed: 7 February 2023
- Preceding agencies: Department for Business, Energy and Industrial Strategy; Department for Digital, Culture, Media and Sport
- Dissolved: 20 July 2026
- Superseding agencies: Department for Business, Innovation, Science and Trade; Department for Digital, Culture, Media and Sport; Cabinet Office
- Type: UK Government Department
- Jurisdiction: Government of the United Kingdom
- Headquarters: London, United Kingdom
- Employees: 2,974 (FY2024/25)
- Department executives: Emran Mian, Permanent Secretary; Dame Angela McLean, Government Chief Scientific Adviser
- Child agencies: Advanced Research and Invention Agency; UK Space Agency; Intellectual Property Office; Building Digital UK; Met Office; UK Research and Innovation; Ordnance Survey; Council for Science and Technology; Government Office for Science; Regulatory Innovation Office; National Physical Laboratory; Copyright Tribunal; Information Commissioner's Office
- Website: gov.uk/dsit

The Department for Science, Innovation and Technology (DSIT) was a ministerial department of the government of the United Kingdom. It was established on 7 February 2023 by a cabinet reshuffle under the Rishi Sunak premiership.

The department took on policy responsibilities from the former Department for Business, Energy and Industrial Strategy (BEIS) and the Department for Digital, Culture, Media and Sport (DCMS). The new department was responsible for helping to encourage, develop and manage the UK's scientific, research, and technological outputs. DSIT was also responsible for managing the necessary physical and digital infrastructure and regulation to support the British economy, UK public services, national security, and wider UK Government priorities.

The department was led by the Secretary of State for Science, Innovation and Technology, supported by a number of junior ministers, and senior civil servants. The final secretary of state was Liz Kendall.

The department was disbanded at the start of the Burnham ministry on 20 July 2026, with the majority of responsibilities reverting to the Department for Business and Trade and the Department for Culture, Media and Sport. The Government Digital Service, which had previously been part of the Cabinet Office, was moved to DCMS, with some responsibilities relating to artificial intelligence being moved to the Cabinet Office.

== History ==
The department was established on 7 February 2023 after a cabinet reshuffle by Prime Minister Rishi Sunak. It absorbed some of the functions and responsibilities of the former Department for Business, Energy and Industrial Strategy (BEIS) and the 'Digital' portfolio from the former Department for Digital, Culture, Media and Sport (DCMS). The new department's first Secretary of State, Michelle Donelan, was the final Secretary of State for Digital, Culture, Media and Sport. Additionally, the new department became responsible for a number of agencies and offices drawn from across the rest of the UK Government. These included the Government Office for Science (formerly under BEIS), the Office for Science and Technology Strategy (formerly of the Cabinet Office), the Office for Life Sciences (jointly with the Department of Health and Social Care (DHSC), formerly a BEIS-DHSC joint unit) and the Office for Artificial Intelligence (formerly of the Department for Digital, Culture, Media and Sport).

== Responsibilities ==
The following responsibilities of DSIT were outlined by Rishi Sunak upon the department's establishment in 2023.

=== Research and innovation ===
DSIT was responsible for positioning the UK at the forefront of global scientific and technological advancement. It was intended for the department to drive innovation that changes lives and sustains economic growth. It was intended to do this by maintaining and developing the physical and digital infrastructure and regulation necessary to support the UK economy and public services, and UK national security.

Another stated responsibility of the department was to put British public services, including the NHS and schools at the forefront of innovation, championing new ways of working (with an express focus on STEM subjects to improve outcomes for people.

DSIT was further responsible for managing the UK Government's Research and Development schemes, aiming to optimise public investment to support areas of relative UK strength and increase the level of private investment in an effort to make the UK economy the "most innovative" in the world. Moreover, DSIT was charged with promoting a diverse research and innovation system that connected discovery to new companies, growth and jobs – including by delivering world-class physical and digital infrastructure. This was with the professed intention of making the UK the "best place" to start and grow a technology business or to develop and attract "top talent". DSIT also functioned as a means of strengthening international collaboration on science and technology in line with the findings of the 2021 Integrated Review, and to ensure that British researchers were able to continue to work with leading scientists in Europe and around the world.

==== International Science Partnerships Fund ====
DSIT funded and supported multiple bilateral and multilateral international science initiatives through its International Science Partnerships Fund (ISPF). These programmes were administered in collaboration with UK Research and Innovation (UKRI), the British Council, and various international partner governments and institutions. Programme's funded by the ISPF included the UK–France Researcher Mobility Scheme which supported short-term visits by UK-based researchers to France and supported collaboration in Horizon Europe priority areas such as artificial intelligence, energy transition, and Earth observation. Another ISPF funded programme was the UK–Israel Research Collaboration, which was jointly supported by DSIT and Israel's Ministry of Innovation, Science and Technology (MOST). It provided £1.8 million (NIS 9 million) to promote joint research on shared priorities, and offered grants of up to £200,000 for collaborative teams in both countries. DSIT also supported several partnerships in advanced technologies with the United States through ISPF, including the US–UK Artificial Intelligence for Realistic Science, Global Centers on Clean Energy and Climate Change, and the US–UK Quantum Science & Technologies programme. These initiatives were supported by UKRI and partner US institutions.

=== Legislation and regulation ===
On a legislative and regulatory level, DSIT was responsible for delivering key legislative and regulatory reforms to drive competition and promote innovation. This included completing the passage of new digital and data laws. DSIT was also responsible for leading the UK Government's pro-innovation approach to regulating AI.

== Ministers ==
At the time of the department's disbandment in 2026, its ministerial team was as follows, with cabinet ministers in bold:

Minister	Portrait	Office	Portfolio
**Liz Kendall** MP		**Secretary of State for Science, Innovation and Technology**	The Secretary of State has overall responsibility for the Department for Science, Innovation and Technology: Online Safety Act 2023; oversight of science and technology; economic and national security; skills and talent; landscape review; research bureaucracy; regulation; overall R&D budget; Horizon Europe; Advanced Research and Invention Agency (ARIA); UK Research and Innovation (UKRI) relationship; OneWeb shareholding; British Technology Investments Ltd
Patrick Vallance, Baron Vallance of Balham		Minister of State for Science, Innovation, Research and Nuclear	Domestic science and research ecosystem, including Public Sector Research Establishments (PSREs); International science and research, including space science; Horizon Europe; R&D; Life sciences; Quantum, engineering biology and semiconductors; Advanced Research and Invention Agency (ARIA); Government Office for Technology Transfer (GOTT); UK Research and Innovation (UKRI); Tech and innovation across the missions; Regulatory Innovation Office
Ian Murray MP		Minister of State for Digital Government and Data	Public sector reform; Digital products; Data policy
Kanishka Narayan MP		Parliamentary Under-Secretary of State for AI and Online Safety	AI Opportunities; AI Security Institute; Intellectual Property Office (IPO); Semiconductors; Tech for Growth; Online Safety
Liz Lloyd, Baroness Lloyd of Effra		Parliamentary Under-Secretary of State for Digital Economy	Cyber; Telecoms; Space; Economic security; Regulatory Innovation Office (RIO); Digital inclusion and skills; Talent – entrepreneurial and investor
James Frith MP		Parliamentary Under-Secretary of State for Digital ID	Digital ID

The department's ministers were supported by the department's civil servants under the leadership of a Permanent Secretary. The incumbent Permanent Secretary was Emran Mian.

The Government Chief Scientific Adviser was also attached to the department, and holds the rank of Permanent Secretary. The incumbent Chief Scientific Adviser was Dame Angela McLean. The National Technology Advisor was also based within the department.

== Agencies and public bodies ==
The following agencies and public bodies were sponsored by DSIT.

=== Executive agencies ===
- Intellectual Property Office
- Met Office

=== Executive non-departmental public bodies ===
- Advanced Research and Invention Agency
- Information Commissioner's Office
- UK Research and Innovation

=== Tribunals ===
- Copyright Tribunal

=== Public corporations ===
- National Physical Laboratory
- Ordnance Survey

=== Other ===
- British Technology Investments
- Building Digital UK (BDUK)
- Government Digital Service
- Government Office for Science
- Ofcom
- Office for Life Sciences (OLS)
- Regulatory Innovation Office (RIO)
- UK Shared Business Services
- UK Space Agency

=== Former ===
- Central Digital and Data Office
- Incubator for Artificial Intelligence
- Phone-paid Services Authority

== See also ==
- Department for Digital, Culture, Media and Sport (2017–2023) – from which DSIT absorbed the digital portfolio.
- Department for Business, Energy and Industrial Strategy (2016–2023) – defunct department from which DSIT inherited various responsibilities
- Department for Innovation, Universities and Skills (2007–2009) – a defunct UK government department with a similar overall purpose.
- Ministry of Technology (1964–1970) – an historic UK government department with similar responsibilities.
- Department of Scientific and Industrial Research (1916–1965) – a historic UK government department with similar responsibilities.
