= Secretary of State for Energy Security and Net Zero =

Member of the Cabinet of the United Kingdom

United Kingdom Secretary of State for Energy Security and Net Zero
- Royal Arms of His Majesty's Government

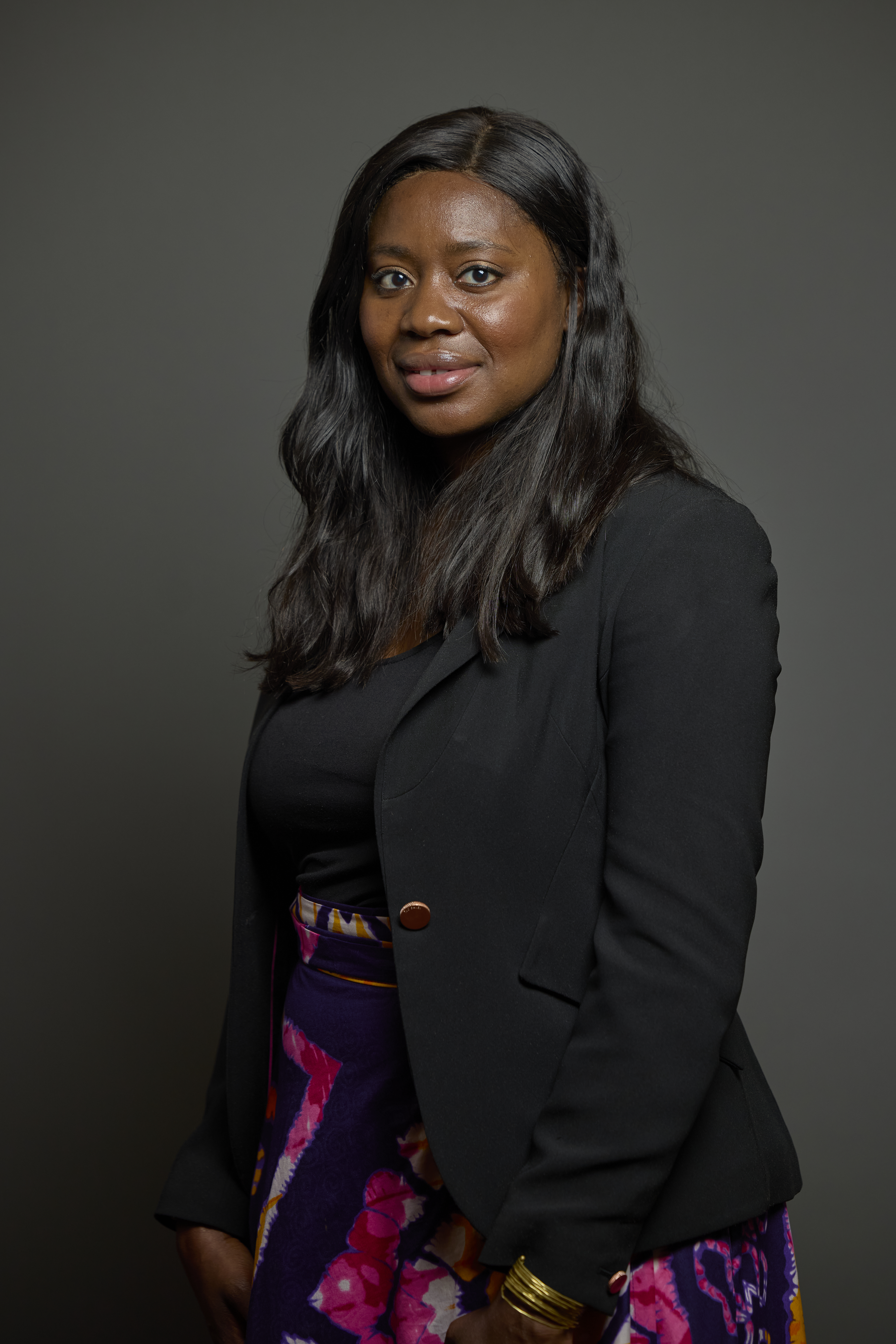
- Incumbent; Miatta Fahnbulleh since 20 July 2026
- Department for Energy Security and Net Zero
- Style: Energy Secretary (informal); The Right Honourable (within the UK and Commonwealth)
- Type: Minister of the Crown
- Status: Secretary of State
- Member of: Cabinet; Privy Council
- Reports to: The Prime Minister
- Seat: Westminster
- Nominator: The Prime Minister
- Appointer: The Monarch; (on the advice of the Prime Minister)
- Term length: At His Majesty's Pleasure
- Formation: 8 January 1974
- First holder: Peter Carington, 6th Baron Carrington (as Secretary of State for Energy)
- Salary: £159,038 per annum (2022) (including £86,584 MP salary)
- Website: gov.uk/government/ministers/secretary-of-state

The Secretary of State for Energy Security and Net Zero is a secretary of state in the Government of the United Kingdom, with responsibility for the Department for Energy Security and Net Zero. The incumbent is a member of the Cabinet of the United Kingdom.

== History ==
Between 1974 and 1992, the post was known as Secretary of State for Energy.

Under the Conservative government of Sir John Major in 1992 the Department of Energy was merged into the Department of Trade and Industry.

The position of Secretary of State for Energy and Climate Change was created on 3 October 2008 when then-Prime Minister Gordon Brown reshuffled his Cabinet. Immediately prior to the creation of the new department, energy policy was the responsibility of the Department for Business, Enterprise and Regulatory Reform.

Former Labour leader Ed Miliband was the inaugural secretary of state at DECC. After Labour lost the 2010 general election and the Cameron–Clegg coalition was formed, Chris Huhne was appointed as his successor. On 3 February 2012, Huhne resigned from the post after it was announced that he would be prosecuted for perverting the course of justice, in relation to accusations that he passed on speeding penalties to his ex-wife to avoid losing his own licence. The post was taken over by Ed Davey on the same day, and served until the Liberal Democrats left government, and Davey lost his seat, in 2015.

Amber Rudd was the final secretary of state at DECC, until she became Home Secretary. The post was formed into the new Department for Business, Energy and Industrial Strategy by new prime minister Theresa May in July 2016.

On 7 February 2023, a government reshuffle meant that the Department for Business, Energy and Industrial Strategy was split up into separate departments. The Department for Energy Security and Net Zero took on the energy portfolio and policy functions from the Department for Business, Energy and Industrial Strategy.

Grant Shapps was appointed the first Secretary of State for the department, having previously been the last holder of the office of Secretary of State for Business, Energy and Industrial Strategy from 2022 to 2023. The department was tasked by the Prime Minister, Rishi Sunak, with "securing our long-term energy supply, bringing down bills and halving inflation".

In May 2023 the position was incorporated as a corporation sole.

== List ==
=== Secretary of State for Energy (1974–1992) ===
Colour key (for political parties):
Conservative Labour

Secretary of State	Term of office		Political party	Ministry
Peter Carington, 6th Baron Carrington	8 January 1974	4 March 1974	Conservative	Heath
Eric Varley MP for Chesterfield	5 March 1974	10 June 1975	Labour	Wilson III & IV
Tony Benn MP for Bristol South East	10 June 1975	4 May 1979	Labour	Wilson III & IV
Tony Benn MP for Bristol South East	10 June 1975	4 May 1979	Labour	Callaghan
David Howell MP for Guildford	5 May 1979	14 September 1981	Conservative	Thatcher I
Nigel Lawson MP for Blaby	14 September 1981	11 June 1983	Conservative	Thatcher I
Peter Walker MP for Worcester	11 June 1983	13 June 1987	Conservative	Thatcher II
Cecil Parkinson MP for Hertsmere	13 June 1987	24 July 1989	Conservative	Thatcher III
John Wakeham MP for South Colchester and Maldon	24 July 1989	11 April 1992	Conservative	Thatcher III
John Wakeham MP for South Colchester and Maldon	24 July 1989	11 April 1992	Conservative	Major I
Department abolished 1992. Functions transferred to the Department of Trade and Industry.

=== Secretary of State for Energy and Climate Change (2008–2016) ===
Colour key (for political parties):
Labour Liberal Democrats Conservative

Secretary of State	Term of office		Political party	Ministry
Ed Miliband MP for Doncaster North	3 October 2008	11 May 2010	Labour	Brown
Chris Huhne MP for Eastleigh	12 May 2010	3 February 2012	Liberal Democrats	Cameron (Coalition)
Ed Davey MP for Kingston and Surbiton	3 February 2012	8 May 2015	Liberal Democrats	Cameron (Coalition)
Amber Rudd MP for Hastings and Rye	11 May 2015	14 July 2016	Conservative	Cameron II
Department abolished 2016, merged into Department for Business, Energy and Industrial Strategy.

=== Secretary of State for Business, Energy and Industrial Strategy (2016–2023) ===
Colour key (for political parties):
Conservative

Secretary of State	Term of office		Political party	Ministry
Greg Clark MP for Tunbridge Wells	14 July 2016	24 July 2019	Conservative	May I
Greg Clark MP for Tunbridge Wells	14 July 2016	24 July 2019	Conservative	May II
Andrea Leadsom MP for South Northamptonshire	24 July 2019	13 February 2020	Conservative	Johnson I
Andrea Leadsom MP for South Northamptonshire	24 July 2019	13 February 2020	Conservative	Johnson II
Alok Sharma MP for Reading West	13 February 2020	8 January 2021	Conservative	Johnson II
Kwasi Kwarteng MP for Spelthorne	8 January 2021	6 September 2022	Conservative	Johnson II
Jacob Rees-Mogg MP for North East Somerset	6 September 2022	25 October 2022	Conservative	Truss
Grant Shapps MP for Welwyn Hatfield	25 October 2022	7 February 2023	Conservative	Sunak

=== Secretary of State for Energy Security and Net Zero (2023–present) ===
Colour key (for political parties):
Conservative Labour

Secretary of State	Term of office		Political party	Ministry
Grant Shapps; MP for Welwyn Hatfield	7 February 2023	31 August 2023	Conservative	Sunak
Claire Coutinho; MP for East Surrey	31 August 2023	5 July 2024	Conservative	Sunak
Ed Miliband; MP for Doncaster North	5 July 2024	20 July 2026	Labour	Starmer
Miatta Fahnbulleh; MP for Peckham	20 July 2026	Incumbent	Labour	Burnham

== See also ==
- Secretary of State for Energy and Climate Change – ministerial position from 2008 to 2016.
- Minister of State for Energy
