= Office for Life Sciences =

British government agency

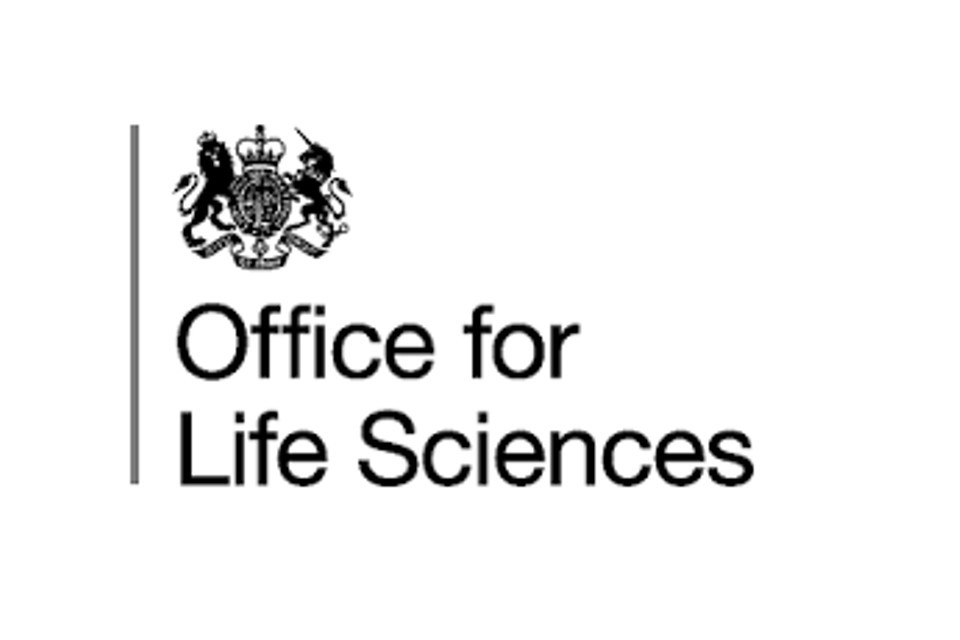
- Abbreviation: OLS
- Formation: 2009
- Legal status: Government unit
- Purpose: Government advisory for life sciences policy
- Region served: United Kingdom
- Director: Alex Mclaughlin (Interim)
- Affiliations: Department for Science, Innovation and Technology Department of Health and Social Care
- Website: www.gov.uk/government/organisations/office-for-life-sciences

The Office for Life Sciences (OLS) is part of the British government. The organisation supports the delivery of the UK Government's life sciences and innovation policy by connecting decision making across government. Informed by productive engagement with industry, the OLS promotes research, innovation, and technology within government for the improvement of healthcare.

The office sits across the Department for Science, Innovation and Technology and the Department of Health and Social Care, reporting to the Minister for Science, Research and Innovation and the Minister for Health and Secondary Care. The work of the OLS is held to account by the UK Parliament, including the Science, Innovation and Technology Select Committee, and the Health and Social Care Select Committee.

== History ==
The Office for Life Sciences was created in 2009 following an announcement by UK Prime Minister Gordon Brown on the establishment of a new cross-government unit to drive forward innovation within the healthcare system, and to support national policy making on the UK's attractiveness as a market for medicines and medical devices and technologies. The OLS was supported through its inception by Lord Drayson as Minister of State for Science and Innovation.

== Leadership ==
The Office for Life Sciences is a joint-government office of the Department for Science, Innovation and Technology and the Department of Health and Social Care, and is answerable to government ministers.

The OLS is headed up by civil servants, with the leadership as follows:

Position	Name	Tenure
Director	Kristen McLeod	October 2017 - November 2021
Director	Rosalind Campion	November 2021 - October 2025
Director	Alex Mclaughlin	October 2025 - present
Executive Chair	Steve Bates	

== Strategy ==
=== Life Sciences Blueprint (2009–2010) ===
The Life Sciences Blueprint, published in July 2009, set out a vision for UK life sciences policy which the OLS was tasked with supporting. The blueprint focused on:

- Strengthening the NHS champion for innovation
- Building a more integrated life sciences strategy
- Ensuring access to finance and stimulating investment
- Marketing the UK's life sciences industry internationally.

=== Strategy for UK Life Sciences (2011–2017) ===
The Strategy for UK Life Sciences was published in December 2011 and led by the Department for Business, Innovation and Skills and Department of Health. The paper was one of the first policy documents on life sciences under the Conservative-Liberal Democrat coalition government, which expanded upon the work of the previous Labour administration in building the UK's life sciences clout. The strategy outlined an agenda for regulatory and medicines access reform to boost UK attractiveness and to deliver greater innovation within the NHS and the wider healthcare system.

=== Life Sciences Industrial Strategy (2017–2021) ===
The UK's Industrial Strategy is a core legacy of Theresa May's premiership which sets out a move towards a more interventionist industrial agenda than that of her Conservative predecessors. With life sciences recognised as a key sector of the Industrial Strategy, Professor Sir John Bell was asked to formulate a specific strategy for the sector. The Life Sciences Industrial Strategy was split into seven main themes and made several recommendations to expand and grow the UK's scientific and research base.

The Life Sciences Industrial Strategy was accompanied by two negotiated 'sector deals', a type of bespoke arrangement between government and industry, which agreed specific-shared innovation priorities, including the commitment to scale-up the UK's genomic sequencing capabilities. In January 2020, an update to the strategy was published by the UK Government which examined the progress to date in achieving the 2017 vision.

=== Life Sciences Vision (2021–present) ===
In March 2021, it was announced that the UK Government would introduce a new plan for growth to replace the Industrial Strategy. In an open letter to businesses, Chancellor Rishi Sunak and Business Secretary Kwasi Kwarteng set out the government's vision for the Plan for Growth which would take advantage of COVID-19 recovery planning to deliver the ambitions of the 2019 Conservative Party manifesto. The plan is the legacy of Downing Street advisor Dominic Cummings which seeks to place technology and innovation at the heart of the UK’s economic future. The Plan for Growth continues elements of the Industrial Strategy, including the Life Science Sector Deals, and policy specific proposals would be made within 12 months of its publication.

Following the publication of the Plan for Growth, the UK Government published the Life Sciences Vision in July 2021 which set out a policy specific framework for the government's approach to life sciences policy. At the centre of the framework is the vision to make the UK the globally leading location for life sciences within a decade, by 2031.

It sets out three core collaborative ambitions:

- Build on the UK’s world class science and research capabilities – making the UK the best place in the world to trial and test products at scale, underpinned by an ever improving genomic and health data infrastructure
- Make the NHS the country’s most powerful driver of innovation – through the development, testing and adoption of new technologies at a population-scale, using new technology to get diagnosis and treatment right first time, and building genuine trust between the NHS and the sector about what can be achieved by working closely together
- Create an outstanding business environment for Life Science companies – in which incentives and structures are aligned to support company growth, innovation and investment – underpinned by a world class regulatory environment and bringing to bear the full financial firepower of the City of London to support companies to grow

It sets out seven healthcare missions (eight combined with the government's drug strategy) for the sector to encourage innovation and address unmet clinical need:

1. Improving translational capabilities in neurodegeneration and dementia
2. Enabling early diagnosis and treatments, including immune therapies such as cancer vaccines
3. Sustaining the UK position in novel vaccine discovery development and manufacturing
4. Treatment and prevention of cardiovascular diseases and its major risk factors, including obesity
5. Reducing mortality and morbidity from respiratory disease in the UK and globally
6. Addressing the underlying biology of ageing
7. Increasing the understanding of mental health conditions, including work to redefine diseases and develop translational tools to address them.

The Life Sciences Vision is a part of the UK Government's Plan for Growth.

== Work of the OLS ==
=== Life sciences indicators ===
Since 2015, the Office for Life Sciences has published data annually which assesses UK life science sector performance against international standards, practices, and trends. The indicators cover the research environment, domestic market, production environment, international collaboration, investment environment, and access to skilled labour.

The data is routinely used by policy makers to track sector performance. In July 2023, the UK's primary pharmaceutical representative body, the Association of the British Pharmaceutical Industry (ABPI), responded to a publication of the indicators and assessed that inward life sciences foreign direct investment (FDI) had fallen by 47% in 2022 compared to 2021, falling to £1 billion from £1.9 billion.
