= Central Digital and Data Office =

UK government agency

Agency overview
- Formed: January 2021
- Dissolved: January 2025
- Headquarters: 10 Whitechapel High Street, London
- Agency executives: Paul Willmott, Chair; Mike Potter, Government Chief Digital Officer
- Parent department: Department for Science, Innovation and Technology

The Central Digital and Data Office was an agency (Note: It was not an executive agency, but was instead classed as a high profile group) under the United Kingdom's Department for Science, Innovation and Technology which was responsible for coordinating digital, data, and technological programmes across the government, and setting standards in those areas. In January 2025, the body was merged into the Government Digital Service.

It was established in January 2021 under the Cabinet Office, and was moved to the Department for Science, Innovation and Technology by the incoming Labour government in 2024. The CDDO shared an office with the Government Digital Service in London, and both organisations were guided by the Digital Advisory Board.
