= Secretary of State for Science, Innovation and Technology =

United Kingdom government cabinet minister

United Kingdom Secretary of State for Science, Innovation and Technology
- Royal Arms of His Majesty's Government
- Department for Science, Innovation and Technology
- Style: Science Secretary (informal); The Right Honourable (within the UK and Commonwealth)
- Type: Minister of the Crown
- Status: Secretary of State
- Member of: Cabinet; Privy Council; National Security Council
- Reports to: The Prime Minister
- Seat: Westminster
- Nominator: The Prime Minister
- Appointer: The Monarch; (on the advice of the Prime Minister)
- Term length: At His Majesty's pleasure
- Formation: 3 November 1959: (as Minister for Science); 7 February 2023: (as Secretary of State for Science, Innovation and Technology)
- First holder: Quintin Hogg (as Minister for Science)
- Final holder: Liz Kendall (as Secretary of State for Science, Innovation and Technology)
- Abolished: 20 July 2026
- Salary: £159,038 per annum (2022) (including £86,584 MP salary)
- Website: gov.uk/government/ministers/secretary-of-state-for-science-innovation-and-technology

The secretary of state for science, innovation and technology was a secretary of state in the government of the United Kingdom, with responsibility for the Department for Science, Innovation and Technology. The incumbent was a member of the Cabinet of the United Kingdom.

== Responsibilities ==
The responsibilities of the secretary of state included:

- Online Safety Bill
- Oversight of Science and Technology
- Economic and national security
- Skills and Talent
- Landscape review
- Research bureaucracy
- Regulation
- Overall R&D budget
- Horizon Europe
- Advanced Research and Invention Agency
- UK Research and Innovation
- OneWeb shareholding
- British Technology Investments Ltd

== History ==
In 1915 a Privy Council Committee for Scientific and Industrial Research' consisting at first of six ministers and three other privy councillors in their personal capacities was established. Because of the close connection between education and research, the President of the Board of Education was nominated as vice-president of the committee of the Privy Council. With the increasing importance of the industrial side of research, these initial arrangements soon became inadequate.

Consequently, in December 1916 a separate Department of Scientific and Industrial Research was created which headed by the lord president of the Council. In 1959 responsibility for science was given to a separate minister for science. The only holder of this office was Quintin Hogg (then 2nd Viscount Hailsham) who until October 1959 had been Lord President of the Council.

In 1964 the offices of Minister for Science and Minister of Education were merged to create the position of Secretary of State for Education and Science with Quintin Hogg remaining in post. From June 1970 to March 1974, this post was held by future Prime Minister Margaret Thatcher.

In 1992, the responsibility for science was transferred to the Office of Science and Technology initially based in the Cabinet Office. In 1995 responsibility was transferred to the secretary of state for trade and industry.

In 2007, under Gordon Brown's new premiership, the position of Secretary of State for Innovation, Universities and Skills was created, this role took over responsibility for science and innovation from the secretary of state for trade and industry and responsibility for higher education from the secretary of state for education and skills. In 2009 the responsibilities of the secretaries of state for business, enterprise and regulatory reform and innovation, universities and skills were merged to created the position of Secretary of State for Business, Innovation and Skills. In July 2016, Prime Minister Theresa May decided to merge the Department for Energy and Climate Change into this department resulting in the position being renamed to Secretary of State for Business, Energy and Industrial Strategy.

The current office was created by a government reshuffle on 7 February 2023, combining responsibilities from the Department for Business, Energy and Industrial Strategy with responsibilities from the Department for Digital, Culture, Media and Sport and from the Government Office for Science. The department and secretary of state have responsibilities to "deliver improved public services, create new and better-paid jobs and grow the economy."

In May 2023 the position was incorporated as a corporation sole.

On 20 July 2026 it was merged with the Department for Business and Trade.

== List ==
=== Minister for Science (1959–1964) ===
Colour key (for political parties):
Conservative

Minister	Took office	Left office	Political party	Ministry
Quintin Hogg (Viscount Hailsham 1950-1963) MP for St Marylebone (1963 onwards)	3 November 1959	31 March 1964	Conservative	Harold Macmillan
Quintin Hogg (Viscount Hailsham 1950-1963) MP for St Marylebone (1963 onwards)	3 November 1959	31 March 1964	Conservative	Alec Douglas-Home
Functions transferred to the Secretary of State for Education and Science.

=== Secretary of State for Education and Science (1964–1992) ===
Colour key (for political parties):
Conservative Labour

Secretary of State	Took office	Left office	Political party	Ministry
Quintin Hogg MP for St Marylebone	1 April 1964	16 October 1964	Conservative	Alec Douglas-Home
Michael Stewart MP for Fulham	18 October 1964	22 January 1965	Labour	Harold Wilson
Anthony Crosland MP for Great Grimsby	22 January 1965	29 August 1967	Labour	Harold Wilson
Patrick Gordon Walker MP for Leyton	29 August 1967	6 April 1968	Labour	Harold Wilson
Edward Short MP for Newcastle upon Tyne Central	6 April 1968	19 June 1970	Labour	Harold Wilson
Margaret Thatcher; MP for Finchley	20 June 1970	4 March 1974	Conservative	Edward Heath
Reginald Prentice; MP for Newham North East	5 March 1974	9 June 1975	Labour	Harold Wilson
Fred Mulley; MP for Sheffield Park	10 June 1975	9 September 1976	Labour	Harold Wilson
Fred Mulley; MP for Sheffield Park	10 June 1975	9 September 1976	Labour	James Callaghan
Shirley Williams; MP for Hertford and Stevenage	10 September 1976	4 May 1979	Labour	James Callaghan
Mark Carlisle MP for Runcorn	5 May 1979	14 September 1981	Conservative	Margaret Thatcher
Keith Joseph; MP for Leeds North East	14 September 1981	20 May 1986	Conservative	Margaret Thatcher
Kenneth Baker; MP for Mole Valley	21 May 1986	23 July 1989	Conservative	Margaret Thatcher
John MacGregor; MP for South Norfolk	24 July 1989	1 November 1990	Conservative	Margaret Thatcher
Kenneth Clarke; MP for Rushcliffe	2 November 1990	9 April 1992	Conservative	Margaret Thatcher
Kenneth Clarke; MP for Rushcliffe	2 November 1990	9 April 1992	Conservative	John Major
Functions transferred to the Cabinet Office.

=== Secretary of State for Innovation, Universities and Skills (2007–2009) ===
Colour key (for political parties):
Labour

Secretary of State	Took office	Left office	Political party	Ministry
John Denham; MP for Southampton Itchen	28 June 2007	5 June 2009	Labour	Gordon Brown
Functions transferred to the Secretary of State for Business, Innovation and Skills.

=== Secretary of State for Science, Innovation and Technology (2023–2026) ===
Colour key (for political parties):
Conservative Labour

Secretary of State	Took office	Left office	Political party	Ministry
Michelle Donelan; MP for Chippenham	7 February 2023	28 April 2023	Conservative	Rishi Sunak
Chloe Smith (Note: In accordance with the Ministerial and other Maternity Allowances Act 2021 Smith temporarily served during Donelan's maternity leave.); MP for Norwich North	28 April 2023	20 July 2023	Conservative	Rishi Sunak
Michelle Donelan; MP for Chippenham	20 July 2023	5 July 2024	Conservative	Rishi Sunak
Peter Kyle; MP for Hove and Portslade	5 July 2024	5 September 2025	Labour	Keir Starmer
Liz Kendall; MP for Leicester West	5 September 2025	20 July 2026	Labour	Keir Starmer
Functions transferred to the Secretary of State for Business, Innovation, Science and Trade.

=== Secretary of State for Business, Innovation, Science and Trade (2026-present) ===
Colour key (for political parties):
Labour

Secretary of State	Took office	Left office	Political party	Ministry
Jonathan Reynolds; MP for Stalybridge and Hyde	20 July 2026	Incumbent	Labour	Andy Burnham

== See also ==
- Departments of the Government of the United Kingdom
- Cabinet of the United Kingdom
- Minister of State for Science, Research and Innovation
- Shadow Secretary of State for Science, Innovation and Technology
