= Copyright Tribunal =

Intellectual property tribunal in the United Kingdom

- Royal coat of arms of the United Kingdom as used in England and Wales
- Established: 1988
- Jurisdiction: United Kingdom
- Location: Concept House; Newport; Wales
- Authorised by: Copyright, Designs and Patents Act 1988
- Appeals to: High Court of Justice (in England and Wales) Court of Session (in Scotland) High Court of Northern Ireland (in Northern Ireland)
- Website: www.gov.uk/government/organisations/copyright-tribunal

Chairman
- Currently: Judge Hacon

The Copyright Tribunal is a first-instance tribunal in the United Kingdom with jurisdiction over commercial licensing disputes.

It was established by the Copyright, Designs and Patents Act 1988. The tribunal’s jurisdiction covers the whole of the UK.

== History ==
On 20 March 2008, the Innovation, Universities and Skills Committee published its Second Report of Session 2007–08, ‘The work and operation of the Copyright Tribunal [HC 245]’ which sets out the tribunal responsibilities.

In 2010, the Copyright Tribunal was listed as to be 'Abolished with Reservations' under the 2010 UK quango reforms. However, as of July 2023 it is still active.

== Functions ==
Its principal task is adjudicating disputes between collective licensing agencies (such as the Copyright Licensing Agency) and persons (natural or legal) who consider they have been unreasonably refused a licence or offered unreasonable terms.

Collective management organisations have the authority to license copyright works and collect royalties on behalf of their members. They collect royalty payments and distribute the royalties to the copyright owners. The disputes the tribunal is asked to resolve usually relate to the terms and conditions of licences, or the refusal by a collective management organisation to provide a licence.

== Proceedings ==
The tribunal does not sit often. Its last hearing was in 2021, and before that 2019.

Parties are typically represented by legal advisors and counsel at hearings. However, legal representation is not a requirement, and the tribunal may permit other representation or, except in the case of a corporation or an unincorporated body, parties may present their own cases if they wish.

Hearings of the tribunal are normally in public, and a transcript of the proceedings is usually taken.

== People ==
=== Judiciary ===
The tribunal consists of a panel of one chair and two deputy chairs who are appointed by the Lord Chancellor. Up to eight ordinary lay members are appointed by the Secretary of State for Science, Innovation, and Technology.

The current members are:

- Judge Hacon, Chairman
- Colleen Keck, Deputy Chairman
- Andrew Clay, Deputy Chairman
- Mary Halton
- Christine Jackson
- Michael Kaltz
- Ian Whitlock

The membership is confirmed on the following government website https://www.gov.uk/government/organisations/copyright-tribunal/about/membership

=== Administration ===
The tribunal is administered by a secretary, who is a civil servant working in the Intellectual Property Office. However, the secretary plays no part in the decision making process and the tribunal carries out its work and comes to its decisions completely independently of the office or any other part of government.

The secretary acts as a formal channel of communication for the tribunal and all correspondence should be addressed to the secretary.

== Appeals ==
Under the CDPA 1988, the Copyright Tribunal appeals to:

- The High Court of Justice when dealing with a case in England and Wales
- The Court of Session when dealing with a case in Scotland
- The High Court of Northern Ireland when dealing with a case in Northern Ireland

== See also ==
- Australian Copyright Tribunal
