= Secretary of State for International Trade =

Former cabinet position in the UK Government

- Royal Arms of His Majesty's Government
- Department for International Trade
- Style: International Trade Secretary (informal); The Right Honourable (UK and the Commonwealth)
- Status: Secretary of state Minister of the Crown
- Member of: Cabinet; Privy Council; Board of Trade
- Reports to: The Prime Minister
- Seat: Westminster
- Appointer: The Crown on advice of the Prime Minister
- Term length: At His Majesty's Pleasure
- Formation: 13 July 2016
- First holder: Liam Fox
- Abolished: 7 February 2023

The secretary of state for international trade, also referred to as the international trade secretary, was a secretary of state in the Government of the United Kingdom, with overall responsibility for the business of the Department for International Trade and UK Export Finance. The incumbent was a member of the Cabinet of the United Kingdom. During the office's lifetime, the incumbent was concurrently appointed President of the Board of Trade.

The office holder worked alongside the other International Trade ministers. The corresponding shadow minister was the shadow secretary of state for international trade. The secretary of state was also scrutinised by the International Trade Select Committee.

The final officeholder was Kemi Badenoch, following her appointment by Prime Minister Liz Truss in September 2022; she was subsequently reappointed by Rishi Sunak in October 2022. In February 2023, the position was abolished, with its duties merging with those of the Business Secretary to become Secretary of State for Business and Trade.

== Responsibilities ==
Corresponding to what is generally known as a commerce minister in many other countries, the international trade secretary's remit included:

- Forming new free trade agreements for the United Kingdom
- Managing the development of freeports across Britain
- Maintaining current trade agreements with other countries
- Supporting British businesses with international trade

== History ==
The office was created by Prime Minister Theresa May shortly after she took office on 13 July 2016, following the 2016 EU referendum. The office's powers were taken from the trade functions of the secretary of state for business, innovation and skills, which was recreated as the secretary of state for business, energy and industrial strategy as part of a wider government reorganisation.

While the office of Secretary of State for International Trade provided trade services in the post-EU-referendum period, other departments and offices continued to play a role, e.g. DEFRA provided services to the EU and beyond.

== List of secretaries of state ==
Colour key (for political parties):
Conservative

Secretary of State for International Trade
Secretary of State	Term of office		Party	Ministry
Liam Fox; MP for North Somerset	13 July 2016	24 July 2019	Conservative	May I
Liam Fox; MP for North Somerset	13 July 2016	24 July 2019	Conservative	May II
Liz Truss; MP for South West Norfolk	24 July 2019	15 September 2021	Conservative	Johnson I
Liz Truss; MP for South West Norfolk	24 July 2019	15 September 2021	Conservative	Johnson II
Anne-Marie Trevelyan; MP for Berwick-upon-Tweed	15 September 2021	6 September 2022	Conservative	Johnson II
Kemi Badenoch; MP for Saffron Walden	6 September 2022	7 February 2023	Conservative	Truss
Kemi Badenoch; MP for Saffron Walden	6 September 2022	7 February 2023	Conservative	Sunak

== See also ==
- Shadow Secretary of State for International Trade
- First Lord of Trade
- Secretary of State for Business, Energy and Industrial Strategy
- Secretary for Overseas Trade
- Secretary of State for Exiting the European Union (position established concurrently)
