= Secretary of State for Business, Innovation, Science and Trade =

Member of the Cabinet of the United Kingdom

United Kingdom Secretary of State for Business, Innovation, Science and Trade
- Royal Arms of His Majesty's Government

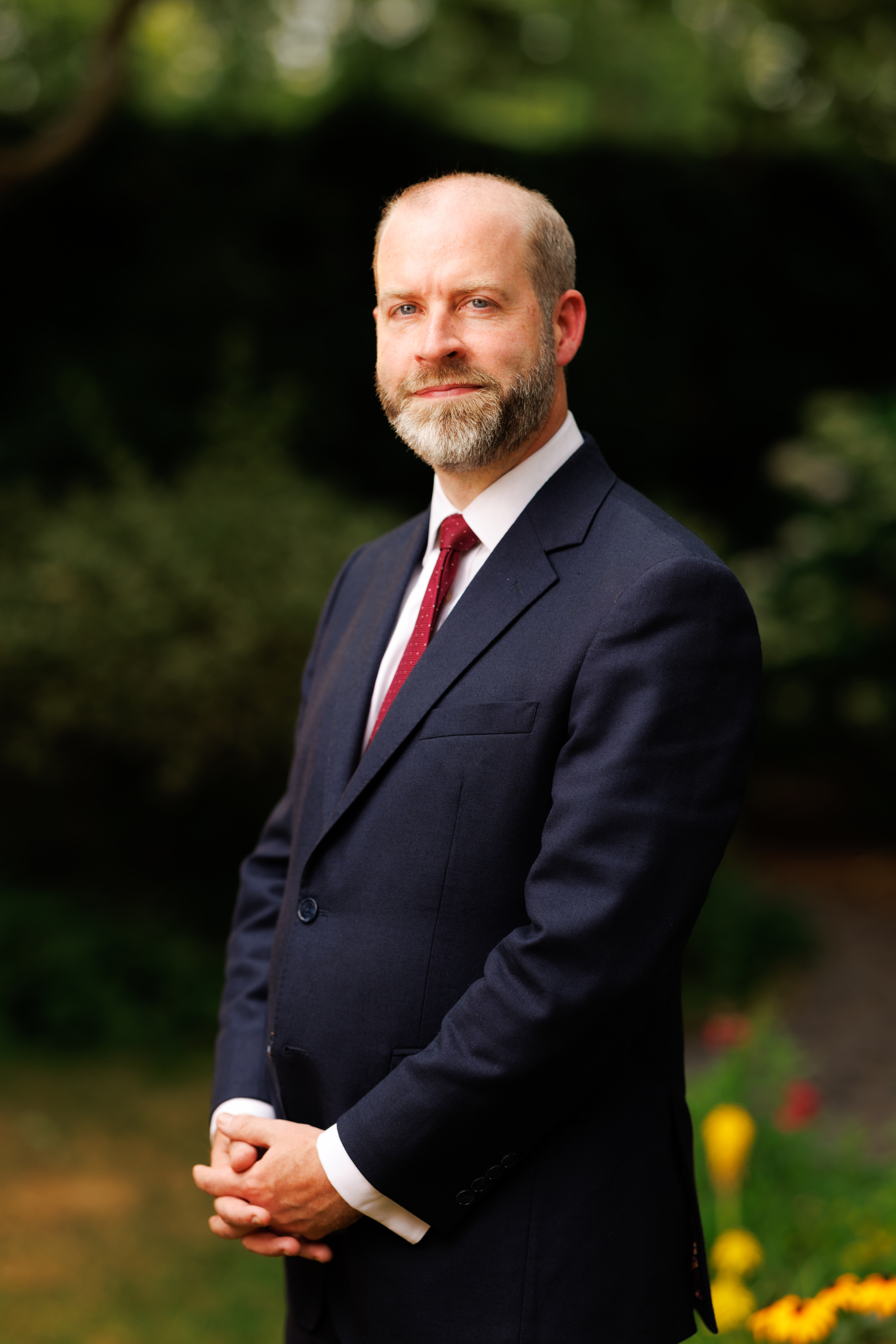
- Incumbent; Jonathan Reynolds since 20 July 2026
- Department for Business, Innovation, Science and Trade
- Style: Business Secretary (informal); The Right Honourable (UK and the Commonwealth)
- Status: Secretary of State; Minister of the Crown
- Member of: Cabinet; Privy Council; Board of Trade
- Reports to: The Prime Minister
- Appointer: The Monarch (on the advice of the Prime Minister)
- Formation: 20 October 1963: (as Secretary of State for Industry, Trade and Regional Development); 20 July 2026: (as Secretary of State for Business, Innovation, Science and Trade)
- First holder: Edward Heath (as Secretary of State for Industry, Trade and Regional Development)
- Salary: £159,038 per annum (2022) (including £86,584 MP salary)
- Website: www.gov.uk/government/ministers/secretary-of-state-for-business-innovation-science-and-trade

The secretary of state for business, innovation, science and trade, also referred to as the business secretary, is a secretary of state in the Government of the United Kingdom, with responsibility for the Department for Business, Innovation, Science and Trade. The incumbent is a member of the Cabinet of the United Kingdom.

The incumbent business secretary is Jonathan Reynolds who was appointed by Andy Burnham on 20 July 2026, returning to the office he had previously held from 2024-2025 The secretary of state is shadowed by the shadow secretary of state for business, innovation, science and trade, currently Julia Lopez since 2026, serving as maternity cover for Claire Coutinho until 2027.

== Responsibilities ==
Corresponding to what is generally known as a commerce minister in many other countries, the business secretary's remit includes:

- Relations with domestic and international business
- Policy relating to deregulation
- Policy relating to international trade and trade agreements
- Import and export policy

== History ==
During the government of Sir Alec Douglas-Home, the then president of the Board of Trade, Edward Heath, was given in addition the job of secretary of state for industry, trade and regional development. This title was not continued under Harold Wilson, but when Heath became Prime Minister in 1970 he decided to merge functions of the Board of Trade and the Ministry of Technology to create the Department of Trade and Industry. The head of this department became known as the secretary of state for trade and industry and also retained the title of President of the Board of Trade.

When Harold Wilson re-entered office in March 1974, the office was split into the Department of Trade, the Department of Industry and the Department of Prices and Consumer Protection, resulting in the creation of three new positions: Secretary of State for Industry, Secretary of State for Prices and Consumer Protection, and Secretary of State for Trade. The title President of the Board of Trade became the secondary title of the Secretary of State for Trade. By 1979 the Department of Prices and Consumer Protection was abolished by the incoming Conservative government and its responsibilities were reintegrated into the Department of Trade. Furthermore, 1983 the offices of trade and industry were remerged and the title of Secretary of State for Trade and Industry was recreated. When Michael Heseltine held this office, he preferred to be known by the older title of President of the Board of Trade, and this practice was also followed by Ian Lang and Margaret Beckett. Heseltine's decision to reuse the old title caused some controversy, and it was discovered that the Board of Trade had not in fact met since the mid-nineteenth century.

Under Gordon Brown's premiership there were two re-namings of the role and three re-alignments of responsibility. In his first cabinet of 2007, he called the post Secretary of State for Business, Enterprise and Regulatory Reform. With this change, the Better Regulation Executive was added to the department but the Office of Science and Innovation was lost. In 2008, the title remained the same but responsibility for energy was lost. In 2009, the Department for Innovation, Universities and Skills was merged into the existing department and the post became Secretary of State for Business, Innovation and Skills.

In July 2016, Prime Minister Theresa May decided to merge the Department for Energy and Climate Change into this department with the responsibilities for post-19 education and skills being returned to the Department for Education resulting in the position being renamed to Secretary of State for Business, Energy and Industrial Strategy. At the same time in July 2016, the post of President of the Board of Trade was transferred to the newly created post of Secretary of State for International Trade.

The current role of Secretary of State for Business and Trade was established on 7 February 2023 after a cabinet reshuffle by Prime Minister Rishi Sunak saw the dissolution of the Department for Business, Energy and Industrial Strategy and its responsibilities transferred to three new departments: Department for Business and Trade, the Department for Science, Innovation and Technology, and the Department for Energy Security and Net Zero. The new Department for Business and Trade absorbed the business policy responsibilities of BEIS, and the functions of the former Department for International Trade.

In May 2023 the position was incorporated as a corporation sole.

In July 2026 the department was merged with the Department for Science, Innovation and Technology to become the Department for Business, Innovation, Science and Trade.

== List of secretaries of state ==
=== Secretary of State for Industry, Trade and Regional Development (1963–1964) ===
Secretary of State	Took office	Left office	Political party	Prime Minister
Edward Heath; MP for Bexley	20 October 1963	16 October 1964	Conservative	Alec Douglas-Home

=== Secretary of State for Trade and Industry (1970–1974) ===
Secretary of State	Took office	Left office	Political party	Prime Minister
John Davies; MP for Knutsford	15 October 1970	5 November 1972	Conservative	Edward Heath
Peter Walker; MP for Worcester	5 November 1972	4 March 1974	Conservative	Edward Heath

=== Secretaries of State for Industry/Prices and Consumer Protection/Trade (1974–1983) ===
Secretary of State for Industry			Secretary of State for Prices and Consumer Protection			Secretary of State for Trade			Political party	Prime Minister
Name	Took office	Left office	Name	Took office	Left office	Name	Took office	Left office	Political party	Prime Minister
Tony Benn; MP for Bristol South East	5 March 1974	10 June 1975	Shirley Williams; MP for Hertford and Stevenage	5 March 1974	10 September 1976	Peter Shore; MP for Stepney and Poplar	5 March 1974	8 April 1976	Labour	Harold Wilson
Eric Varley; MP for Chesterfield	10 June 1975	4 May 1979	Shirley Williams; MP for Hertford and Stevenage	5 March 1974	10 September 1976	Peter Shore; MP for Stepney and Poplar	5 March 1974	8 April 1976	Labour	Harold Wilson
Eric Varley; MP for Chesterfield	10 June 1975	4 May 1979	Shirley Williams; MP for Hertford and Stevenage	5 March 1974	10 September 1976	Edmund Dell; MP for Birkenhead	8 April 1976	11 November 1978	Labour	James Callaghan
Eric Varley; MP for Chesterfield	10 June 1975	4 May 1979	Roy Hattersley; MP for Birmingham Sparkbrook	10 September 1976	4 May 1979	Edmund Dell; MP for Birkenhead	8 April 1976	11 November 1978	Labour	James Callaghan
Eric Varley; MP for Chesterfield	10 June 1975	4 May 1979	Roy Hattersley; MP for Birmingham Sparkbrook	10 September 1976	4 May 1979	John Smith; MP for North Lanarkshire	11 November 1978	4 May 1979	Labour	James Callaghan
Keith Joseph; MP for Leeds North East	4 May 1979	14 September 1981	Department abolished 1979. (Responsibilities transferred to the Department for Trade.)			John Nott; MP for St Ives	5 May 1979	5 January 1981	Conservative	Margaret Thatcher
Keith Joseph; MP for Leeds North East	4 May 1979	14 September 1981	Department abolished 1979. (Responsibilities transferred to the Department for Trade.)			John Biffen; MP for Oswestry	5 January 1981	6 April 1982	Conservative	Margaret Thatcher
Patrick Jenkin; MP for Wanstead and Woodford	14 September 1981	12 June 1983	Department abolished 1979. (Responsibilities transferred to the Department for Trade.)			John Biffen; MP for Oswestry	5 January 1981	6 April 1982	Conservative	Margaret Thatcher
Patrick Jenkin; MP for Wanstead and Woodford	14 September 1981	12 June 1983	Department abolished 1979. (Responsibilities transferred to the Department for Trade.)			Arthur Cockfield, Baron Cockfield	6 April 1982	12 June 1983	Conservative	Margaret Thatcher
Departments merged in 1983 and responsibilities transferred to the Department for Trade and Industry.

=== Secretary of State for Trade and Industry (1983–2007) ===
Secretary of State	Took office	Left office	Political party	Cabinet	Prime minister
Cecil Parkinson; MP for Hertsmere	12 June 1983	11 October 1983	Conservative	Thatcher II	Margaret Thatcher
Norman Tebbit; MP for Chingford	16 October 1983	2 September 1985	Conservative	Thatcher II	Margaret Thatcher
Leon Brittan; MP for Richmond (Yorks)	2 September 1985	22 January 1986	Conservative	Thatcher II	Margaret Thatcher
Paul Channon; MP for Southend West	24 January 1986	13 June 1987	Conservative	Thatcher II	Margaret Thatcher
David Young, Baron Young of Graffham	13 June 1987	24 July 1989	Conservative	Thatcher III	Margaret Thatcher
Nicholas Ridley; MP for Cirencester and Tewkesbury	24 July 1989	13 July 1990	Conservative	Thatcher III	Margaret Thatcher
Peter Lilley; MP for St Albans	14 July 1990	10 April 1992	Conservative	Thatcher III	Margaret Thatcher
Peter Lilley; MP for St Albans	14 July 1990	10 April 1992	Conservative	Major I	John Major
Michael Heseltine (Note: Primarily referred to as President of the Board of Trade, and not as Secretary of State for Trade and Industry); MP for Henley	10 April 1992	5 July 1995	Conservative	Major II	John Major
Ian Lang; MP for Galloway and Upper Nithsdale	5 July 1995	2 May 1997	Conservative	Major II	John Major
Margaret Beckett; MP for Derby South	2 May 1997	27 July 1998	Labour	Blair I	Tony Blair
Peter Mandelson; MP for Hartlepool	27 July 1998	23 December 1998	Labour	Blair I	Tony Blair
Stephen Byers; MP for North Tyneside	23 December 1998	8 June 2001	Labour	Blair I	Tony Blair
Patricia Hewitt; MP for Leicester West	8 June 2001	6 May 2005	Labour	Blair II	Tony Blair
Alan Johnson (Note: Alan Johnson was initially announced on 6 May 2005, after the general election, as being "Secretary of State for Productivity, Energy and Industry and President of the Board of Trade", but after just a week, on 13 May, it was declared that the new title would not be used, after widespread derision of the new name, because an abbreviation for Johnson's title, Productivity, Energy and Industry Secretary, would have been "PENIS".); MP for Hull West and Hessle	6 May 2005	5 May 2006	Labour	Blair III	Tony Blair
Alistair Darling; MP for Edinburgh South West	5 May 2006	28 June 2007	Labour	Blair III	Tony Blair
Department abolished 2007. Responsibilities transferred to the Department for Business, Enterprise and Regulatory Reform and the Department for Innovation, Universities and Skills.

=== Secretary of State for Business, Enterprise and Regulatory Reform (2007–2009) ===
Secretary of State	Took office	Left office	Political party	Cabinet	Prime Minister
John Hutton; MP for Barrow and Furness	28 June 2007	3 October 2008	Labour	Brown	Gordon Brown
Peter Mandelson, Baron Mandelson	3 October 2008	5 June 2009	Labour	Brown	Gordon Brown
Department abolished 2009. Responsibilities transferred to the Department for Business, Innovation and Skills.

=== Secretary of State for Business, Innovation and Skills (2009–2016) ===
Secretary of State	Took office	Left office	Political party	Cabinet	Prime Minister
Peter Mandelson, Baron Mandelson	5 June 2009	11 May 2010	Labour	Brown	Gordon Brown
Vince Cable; MP for Twickenham	12 May 2010	8 May 2015	Liberal Democrats	Cameron-Clegg	David Cameron
Sajid Javid; MP for Bromsgrove	11 May 2015	14 July 2016	Conservative	Cameron II	David Cameron
Department abolished 2016. Responsibilities transferred to the Department for Business, Energy and Industrial Strategy, merging with the Department of Energy and Climate Change

=== Secretary of State for Business, Energy and Industrial Strategy/International Trade (2016–2023) ===
Secretary of State for Business, Energy and Industrial Strategy			Secretary of State for International Trade			Political party	Cabinet	Prime Minister
Secretary of State	Took office	Left office	Secretary of State	Took office	Left office	Political party	Cabinet	Prime Minister
Greg Clark; MP for Tunbridge Wells	14 July 2016	24 July 2019	Liam Fox MP for North Somerset	13 July 2016	24 July 2019	Conservative	May I	Theresa May
Greg Clark; MP for Tunbridge Wells	14 July 2016	24 July 2019	Liam Fox MP for North Somerset	13 July 2016	24 July 2019	Conservative	May II	Theresa May
Andrea Leadsom; MP for South Northamptonshire	24 July 2019	13 February 2020	Liz Truss MP for South West Norfolk	24 July 2019	15 September 2021	Conservative	Johnson I	Boris Johnson
Andrea Leadsom; MP for South Northamptonshire	24 July 2019	13 February 2020	Liz Truss MP for South West Norfolk	24 July 2019	15 September 2021	Conservative	Johnson II	Boris Johnson
Alok Sharma; MP for Reading West	13 February 2020	8 January 2021	Liz Truss MP for South West Norfolk	24 July 2019	15 September 2021	Conservative	Johnson II	Boris Johnson
Kwasi Kwarteng; MP for Spelthorne	8 January 2021	6 September 2022	Anne-Marie Trevelyan MP for Berwick-upon-Tweed	15 September 2021	6 September 2022	Conservative	Johnson II	Boris Johnson
Jacob Rees-Mogg; MP for North East Somerset	6 September 2022	25 October 2022	Kemi Badenoch MP for Saffron Walden	6 September 2022	7 February 2023	Conservative	Truss	Liz Truss
Grant Shapps; MP for Welwyn Hatfield	25 October 2022	7 February 2023	Kemi Badenoch MP for Saffron Walden	6 September 2022	7 February 2023	Conservative	Sunak	Rishi Sunak
Department abolished February 2023. Responsibilities distributed to the newly created Departments for Business and Trade, Energy Security and Net Zero, and Science, Innovation and Technology.

=== Secretary of State for Business and Trade (2023–2026) ===
Secretary of State	Took office	Left office	Political party	Cabinet	Prime Minister
Kemi Badenoch; MP for Saffron Walden	7 February 2023	5 July 2024	Conservative	Sunak	Rishi Sunak
Jonathan Reynolds; MP for Stalybridge and Hyde	5 July 2024	5 September 2025	Labour Co-op	Starmer	Keir Starmer
Peter Kyle MP for Hove and Portslade	5 September 2025	20 July 2026	Labour	Starmer	Keir Starmer

=== Secretary of State for Business, Innovation, Science and Trade (2026–present) ===
Secretary of State	Took office	Left office	Political party	Cabinet	Prime Minister
Jonathan Reynolds; MP for Stalybridge and Hyde	20 July 2026	Incumbent	Labour Co-op	Burnham	Andy Burnham
