= Michelle Donelan =

British politician (born 1984)

The Right Honourable Michelle Donelan
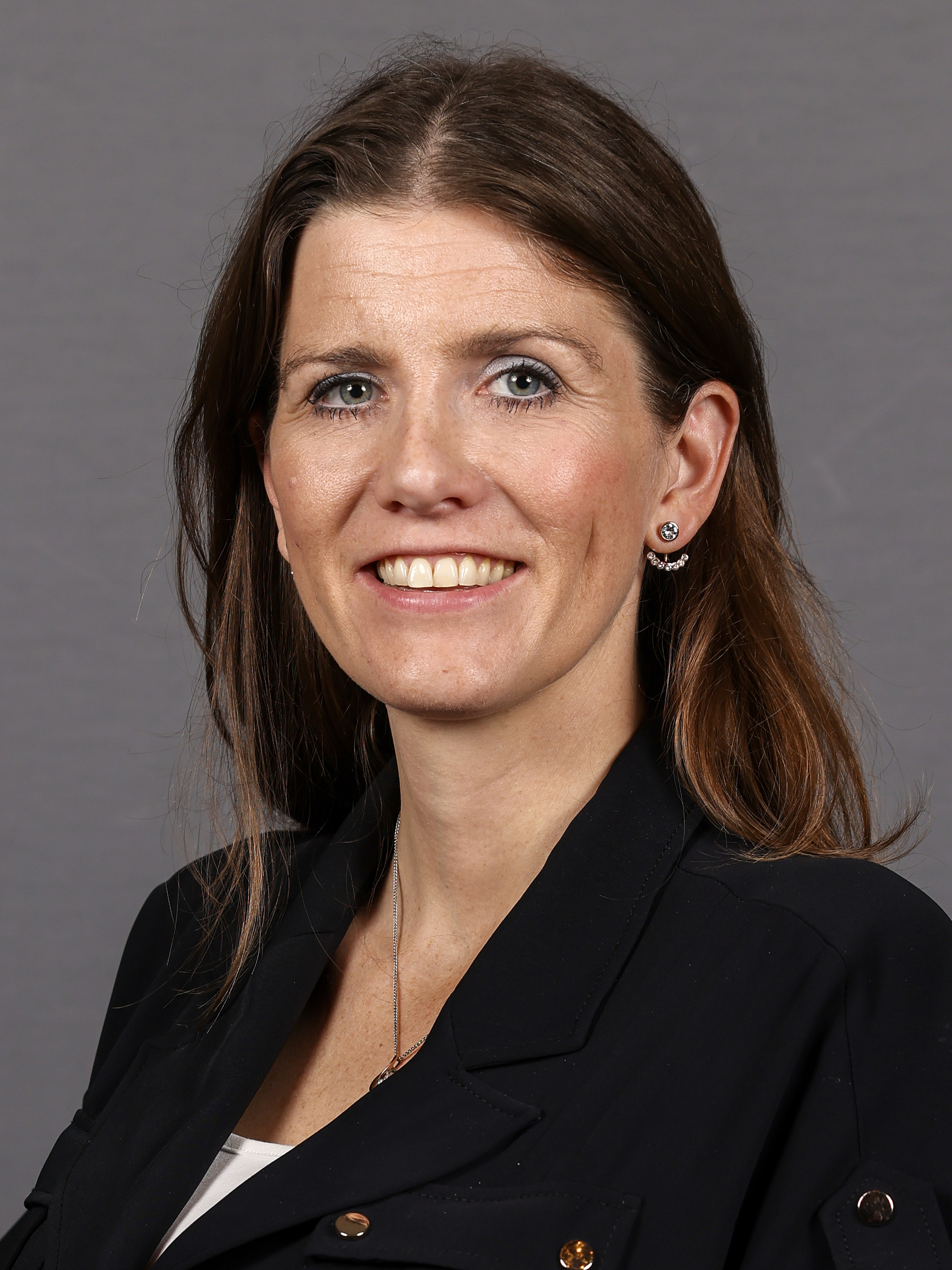
- Official portrait, 2022

Secretary of State for Science, Innovation and Technology
- In office 20 July 2023 – 5 July 2024
- Prime Minister: Rishi Sunak
- Preceded by: Chloe Smith
- Succeeded by: Peter Kyle
- In office 7 February 2023 – 28 April 2023
- Prime Minister: Rishi Sunak
- Preceded by: Office established
- Succeeded by: Chloe Smith

Minister on Leave
- In office 28 April 2023 – 20 July 2023
- Prime Minister: Rishi Sunak
- Interim: Chloe Smith (Note: In accordance with the Ministerial and other Maternity Allowances Act 2021, Smith temporarily served as Science Secretary during Donelan's maternity leave.)

Secretary of State for Digital, Culture, Media and Sport
- In office 6 September 2022 – 7 February 2023
- Prime Minister: Liz Truss; Rishi Sunak
- Preceded by: Nadine Dorries
- Succeeded by: Lucy Frazer

Secretary of State for Education
- In office 5 July 2022 – 7 July 2022
- Prime Minister: Boris Johnson
- Preceded by: Nadhim Zahawi
- Succeeded by: James Cleverly

Minister of State for Higher and Further Education (Note: Known as Minister of State for Universities from 2020 to 2021. Attending cabinet from September 2021.)
- In office 13 February 2020 – 5 July 2022
- Prime Minister: Boris Johnson
- Preceded by: Chris Skidmore
- Succeeded by: Andrea Jenkyns

Parliamentary Under-Secretary of State for Children and Families
- In office 4 September 2019 – 13 February 2020 (Note: Donelan was appointed as maternity cover for Kemi Badenoch.)
- Prime Minister: Boris Johnson
- Preceded by: Kemi Badenoch
- Succeeded by: Vicky Ford

Lord Commissioner of the Treasury
- In office 29 July 2019 – 13 February 2020
- Prime Minister: Boris Johnson
- Preceded by: Jeremy Quin
- Succeeded by: James Morris

Assistant Government Whip
- In office 26 July 2018 – 29 July 2019
- Prime Minister: Theresa May

Member of Parliament for Chippenham
- In office 7 May 2015 – 30 May 2024
- Preceded by: Duncan Hames
- Succeeded by: Sarah Gibson

Personal details
- Born: Michelle Emma May Elizabeth Donelan; 8 April 1984 (age 42) Whitley, Cheshire, England
- Party: Conservative
- Spouse: Tom Turner
- Children: 1
- Education: The County High School, Leftwich; University of York (BA)
- Website: michelledonelan.co.uk

Michelle Emma May Elizabeth Donelan (born 8 April 1984) is a British former politician. A member of the Conservative Party, she served as Secretary of State for Science, Innovation and Technology from February 2023 to July 2024.

Donelan also held three other cabinet positions from 2020 to 2023 under prime ministers Boris Johnson, Liz Truss, and Rishi Sunak. She sat as the Member of Parliament (MP) for Chippenham in Wiltshire from 2015 until she left Parliament after unsuccessfully contesting the new Melksham and Devizes constituency at the 2024 election.

== Early life ==
Donelan was born in 1984 in Whitley, Cheshire, the daughter of Kathleen Johnson and Michael Donelan. She decided to become a politician at the age of six, and later spoke at the Conservative Party Conference in Blackpool at the age of 15.

Donelan was educated at The County High School, Leftwich, before graduating from the University of York with a Bachelor of Arts degree in history and politics. While at university, she was involved in York Student Television. Before entering politics, she worked in the marketing departments of the French fashion magazine Marie Claire and the American professional wrestling promotion WWE.

== Political career ==
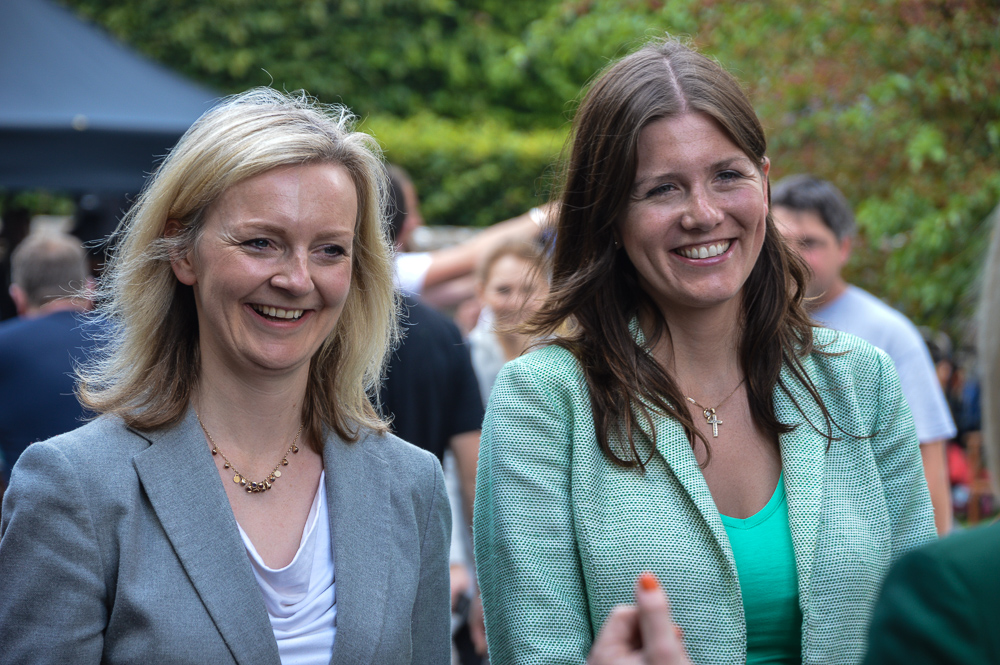
Donelan with Liz Truss, 2015

Donelan stood at the 2010 general election in Wentworth and Dearne, coming second with 17.6% of the vote behind the incumbent Labour MP John Healey.

She was then selected as the prospective parliamentary candidate for Chippenham in February 2013. After her selection at Chippenham, she became a trustee of Help Victims of Domestic Violence, a charitable organisation based in the town and a member of the Steering Group of Wiltshire Carers.

At the 2015 general election, Donelan was elected to Parliament as MP for Chippenham with 47.6% of the vote and a majority of 10,076.

Donelan served on the Education Select Committee between 2015 and 2018.

Before the 2016 referendum, Donelan supported the UK remaining within the European Union.

Donelan was re-elected as MP for Chippenham at the snap 2017 United Kingdom general election with 54.7% of the vote and a majority of 16,630.

At the 2019 general election, Donelan was again re-elected, with a decreased vote share of 54.3% and a decreased majority of 11,288.

=== Whip and Junior Education Minister ===
Donelan was appointed an assistant whip in 2018 and a government whip in July 2019. In September 2019, she was appointed parliamentary under-secretary for children to cover maternity leave for Kemi Badenoch.

In the February 2020 cabinet reshuffle, she became Minister of State for Universities. As of May 2020, her responsibilities included universities and co-chairing the Family Justice Board, which oversees the performance of the family justice system and is advised by the Family Justice Council.

In the 2021 cabinet reshuffle, her role was renamed Minister of State for Higher and Further Education, with the added right to attend cabinet. She was also sworn into the Privy Council.

During her tenure in the Department for Education, she campaigned for freedom of speech in Universities.

=== Secretary of State for Education ===
On 5 July 2022, in the wake of a large number of resignations from the second Johnson ministry over Boris Johnson's handling of the Chris Pincher scandal and other political scandals, Donelan, who was then serving as Minister of State for Higher and Further Education was promoted to Secretary of State for Education, after her predecessor Nadhim Zahawi was appointed Chancellor of the Exchequer.

On 7 July 2022, after less than 36 hours in the role, Donelan resigned as Secretary of State, writing that Johnson had "put us in an impossible position". She was the shortest-serving cabinet member in British history, her tenure being shorter than Earl Temple's four-day tenure as Foreign Secretary in 1783. Following reports she would receive severance pay at Secretary of State level despite her short tenure, Donelan refused this payment.

=== 2022 Conservative Party leadership elections ===
Donelan initially backed Nadhim Zahawi in the July-September 2022 Conservative Party leadership election, later backing Penny Mordaunt following Zahawi's elimination from the contest. After Mordaunt's elimination she endorsed eventual victor Liz Truss. After Truss resigned, she endorsed Rishi Sunak in the October 2022 leadership election.

=== Secretary of State for Digital, Culture, Media and Sport ===
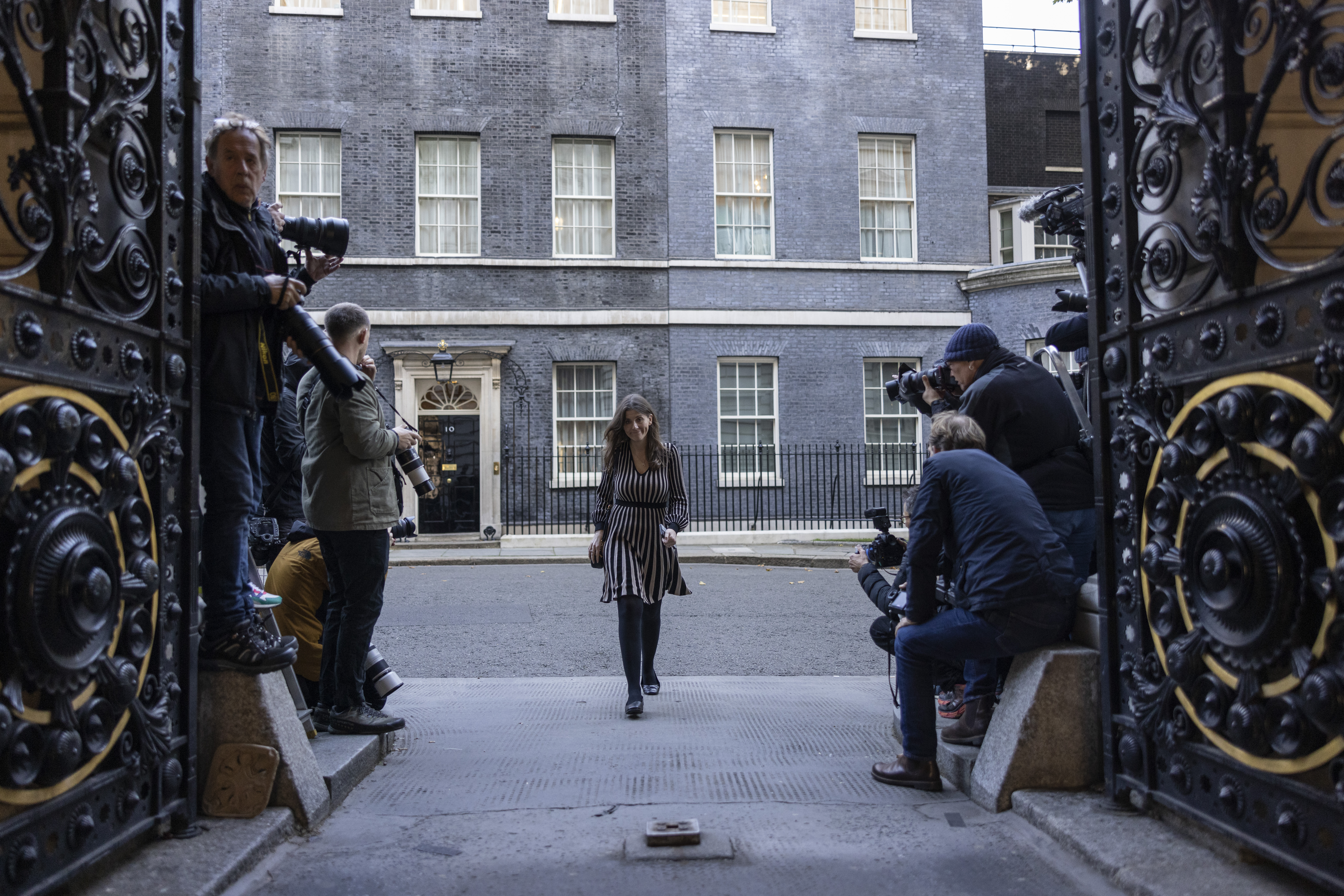
Donelan exiting Downing Street after a meeting of the Liz Truss Cabinet

Donelan was appointed Secretary of State for Digital, Culture, Media and Sport on 7 September 2022 by then prime minister Liz Truss. Rishi Sunak succeeded Truss following the October 2022 Conservative Party leadership election, and Donelan retained her position in the cabinet.

She stated in January 2023 that she was against returning the Parthenon marbles to Greece, on the grounds that restitution would "open a can of worms" and be a "dangerous road to go down." In the same month, Donelan cancelled a plan to privatise Channel 4 that had been announced by Nadine Dorries under Boris Johnson's premiership.

=== Secretary of State for Science, Innovation and Technology ===
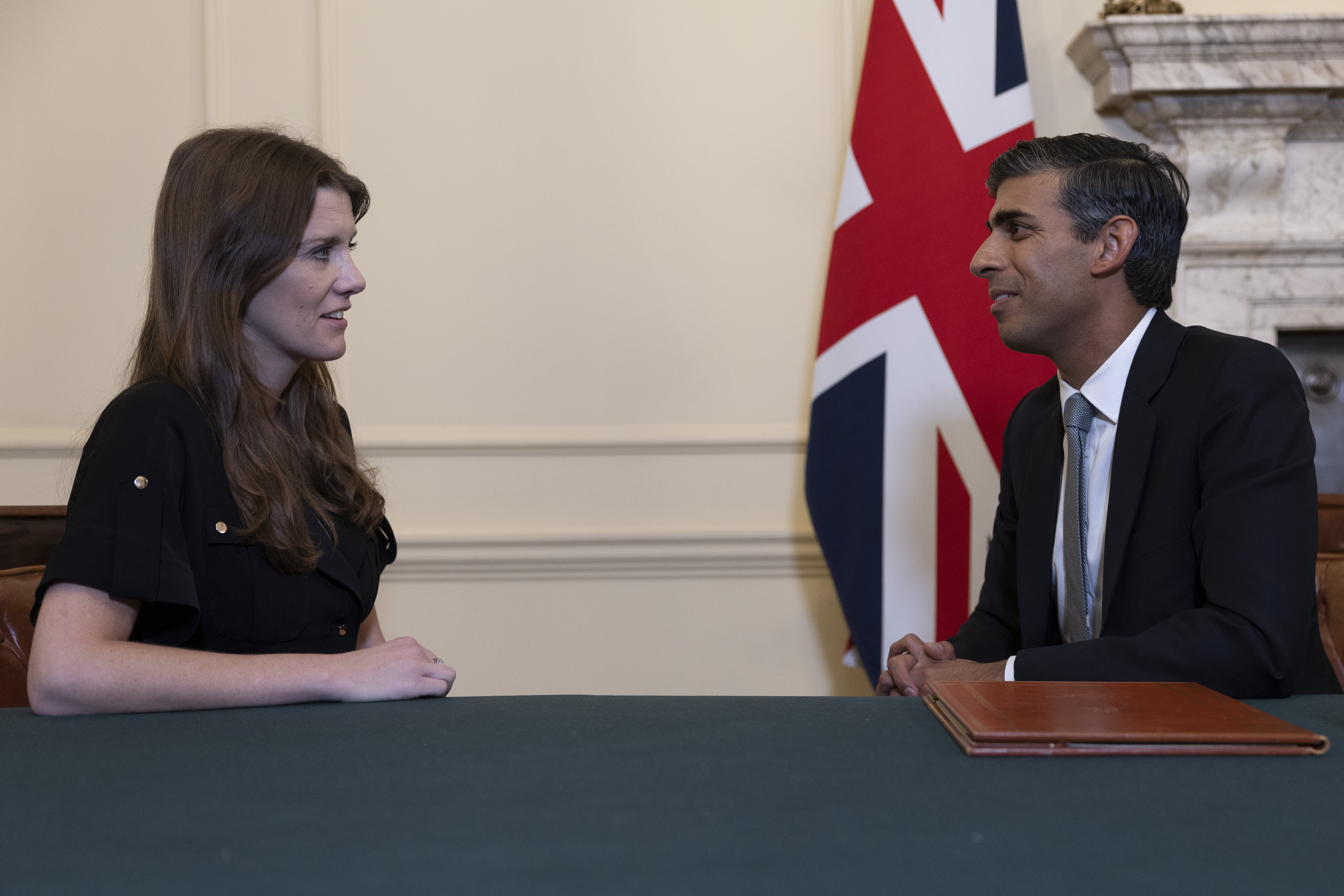
Donelan with Prime Minister Rishi Sunak in 2022

In a reshuffle of Sunak's cabinet on 7 February 2023, Donelan was appointed to the newly created role of Secretary of State for Science, Innovation and Technology.

It was announced on 21 April 2023 that during her maternity leave, Donelan would be temporarily replaced as Secretary of State by Chloe Smith. She returned to her ministerial role on 20 July 2023 after three months of ministerial maternity leave.

Donelan's portfolio in the Department for Science, Innovation and Technology included the controversial Online Safety Act 2023. Under her leadership, the measure was amended and completed its passage through both Houses of Parliament.

In April 2023, following the release of the GPT-4 large language model, Donelan announced that the UK would spend £100 million in initial funding for the Foundation Model Taskforce, modelled on the success of the COVID-19 Vaccine Taskforce, which would seek to ensure the responsible development of advanced artificial intelligence models and mitigate the risks. Soon after, hundreds of AI experts including Geoffrey Hinton, Yoshua Bengio, and Demis Hassabis signed a statement acknowledging AI's risk of extinction. Tech entrepreneur Ian Hogarth, who warned about the race to "God-like AI" and urged governments to intervene with significant regulation, was later named chair of the taskforce.

Donelan announced in November that the taskforce would become the AI Safety Institute. In the same month, the inaugural AI Safety Summit was held at Bletchley Park, which resulted in almost 30 countries, including the United States and China, signing a declaration calling for international cooperation to mitigate the risks posed by AI. In April 2024, Donelan and US commerce secretary Gina Raimondo signed an agreement between the UK and US AI Safety Institutes, to allow them to work together on testing advanced AI models.

==== Libel settlement ====
In October 2023, in her role as science minister, Donelan wrote to the head of UKRI (the body which directs government funding to research and innovation) suggesting that two academics recently appointed to a UKRI advisory group had expressed sympathy for Hamas and shared extremist views. The letter was also published at Donelan's Twitter/X account. In response, Ottoline Leyser, UKRI chief executive, suspended the operations of the advisory group (though not the group itself) and began an inquiry. Over 2,500 academics signed an open letter condemning Donelan's accusation as an attack on academic freedom.

In March 2024, Donelan publicly retracted the allegations and deleted the October tweet. One of the academics, Kate Sang of Heriot-Watt University, had commenced a libel action against Donelan, who was represented by the government legal service. According to Sang's lawyer, Donelan had based her allegations on a misleading press release from the Policy Exchange lobby group. Donelan's department paid compensation of £15,000 to Sang, plus legal costs. Donelan also apologised to the second appointee. Sang's lawyer said "It is extraordinary that a minister should be guided by a lobby group into making serious false allegations about private citizens without doing the first piece of due diligence."

The total cost to public funds was said in April 2024 to be more than £34,000, comprising the previously disclosed £15,000 compensation to Sang, alongside legal costs of £7785 for the Government Legal Department and £11,600 for external legal counsel. In addition, UKRI spent £15,000 on the investigation and £8,280 on legal advice.

=== Parliamentary Candidate for the new Melksham and Devizes constituency ===
In May 2023, Donelan announced she would be contesting at the next general election the Melksham and Devizes constituency, where she lived, as the boundaries of her Chippenham seat had been redrawn. When the election took place in July 2024, she was defeated by Brian Mathew of the Liberal Democrats.

== Post-parliamentary career ==
Following her defeat at the 2024 general election, Donelan has worked as a freelance advisor.

== Personal life ==
Donelan is married to Tom Turner, whose family's procurement company Stronghold Global won government contracts to supply PPE to NHS hospitals, Covid testing sites and universities during the pandemic. She announced that she was pregnant in December 2022, and went on maternity leave from April to July 2023.

== Honours ==
She was appointed a member of the Privy Council on 20 September 2021, invested via video link at Balmoral Castle.

== Notes ==
Parliament of the United Kingdom
Preceded by Duncan Hames	Member of Parliament for Chippenham; 2015–2024	Succeeded by Sarah Gibson
Political offices
Preceded by Jeremy Quin	Lord Commissioner of the Treasury; 2019–2020	Succeeded by James Morris
Preceded by Chris Skidmore	Minister of State for Higher and Further Education; 2020–2022 (Known as Minister of State for Universities 2020–2021)	Succeeded by Andrea Jenkyns as Parliamentary Under-Secretary of State for Skills, Further and Higher Education
Preceded by Nadhim Zahawi	Secretary of State for Education; 2022	Succeeded by James Cleverly
Preceded by Nadine Dorries	Secretary of State for Digital, Culture, Media and Sport; 2022–2023	Succeeded by Lucy Frazer as Secretary of State for Culture, Media and Sport
New office	Secretary of State for Science, Innovation and Technology; 2023–2024	Succeeded by Peter Kyle
