= Regulatory Innovation Office =

Agency overview
- Formed: 8 October 2024
- Preceding agencies: Regulatory Horizons Council; Regulators' Pioneer Fund
- Parent department: Department for Science, Innovation and Technology

The Regulatory Innovation Office (RIO) is an office within the UK Department for Science, Innovation and Technology established on 8 October 2024.

The Office's stated purpose is to speed up regulatory decisions by acting as an intermediary between government, regulators, and businesses. Initially the RIO will concentrate on sectors such as engineering biology, space, artificial intelligence, healthcare, drones, and other autonomous technology.

It will incorporate the existing functions of the Regulatory Horizons Council and the Regulators' Pioneer Fund.

On 10 March 2025, David Willetts was appointed chair.
