= Secretary of state (United Kingdom) =

Member of the Cabinet of the UK government

His Majesty's principal secretaries of state, or secretaries of state, are senior ministers of the Crown in the Government of the United Kingdom. Secretaries of state head most major government departments and make up the majority of the Cabinet of the United Kingdom.

== Legal position ==
In legislation, the term "Secretary of State" is interpreted by the Interpretation Act 1978 as referring to any one of the secretaries of state in use; in practice, such secretaries of state are each allocated a portfolio by the prime minister, and only exercise the powers in that portfolio. Additionally, the Ministers of the Crown Act 1975 provides that anything done by a secretary of state on behalf of a named secretary of state as a corporation sole shall have effect as if done by the named secretary of state. For example, the Secretary of State for Environment, Food and Rural Affairs has been appointed to manage national parks, but could theoretically exercise the powers of, for example, the secretary of state for Scotland at any time.

Under the Ministerial and Other Salaries Act 1975, a maximum of 21 secretaries of state can receive a salary.

Secretaries of state and other government ministers are appointed by the monarch exercising royal prerogative on the advice of the government. By convention, secretaries of state must be a member of either the House of Commons or the House of Lords, but the prime minister can advise the monarch to confer a peerage to satisfy this requirement.

Most secretaries of state are incorporated as a "corporation sole". This gives the minister a separate legal personality, allowing continuity in areas such as the ownership of property between office-holder changes.

== History ==
=== Kingdom of England ===
The origin of the office lies in the office of the king's private secretary. However, by the Tudor period, the office's purview had become more onerous.

In 1539 or 1540, Henry VIII appointed two people to the office. After the Stuart Restoration, the practice of appointing two secretaries of state resumed. A formal division, in the form of the offices of the secretary of state for the Northern Department and the secretary of state for the Southern Department, was made in 1689, though the office had been first divided into the Northern and Southern Department purviews in 1660.

=== After the Union ===
In 1782, the responsibilities of these offices were changed, so that one would be responsible for foreign affairs and one for domestic affairs, thus establishing the embryonic offices of foreign secretary and home secretary. Over time, the number of secretaries of states grew, so that there were five in 1900 and 14 by 1996. There are currently 17 secretaries of state.

== Secretaries of state currently in use ==
Secretaries of state currently in use
| Office | Created | Created from | Dissolved | Dissolved into | Ref(s) |
|---|---|---|---|---|---|
| Secretary of State for the Home Department | 27 March 1782 | Secretary of State for the Northern Department; Secretary of State for the Southern Department | | | |
| Secretary of State for Scotland | 1 May 1707 | | 3 January 1746 | | |
| Secretary of State for Scotland | 26 July 1928 | | | | |
| Secretary of State for Wales | 18 October 1964 | Minister of Welsh Affairs (Home Office) | | | |
| Secretary of State for Defence | 1 April 1964 | Minister of Defence; Secretary of State for War; Secretary of State for Air; First Lord of the Admiralty | | | |
| Secretary of State for Northern Ireland | 27 March 1972 | Governor of Northern Ireland; Governor in Council; Government of Northern Ireland; Minister of the Government of Northern Ireland; Head of a department of the Government of Northern Ireland; Departments of the Government of Northern Ireland | | | |
| Secretary of State for Transport | 10 September 1976 | Secretary of State for the Environment | 4 May 1979 | | |
| Secretary of State for Transport | 5 January 1981 | | 2 May 1997 | Secretary of State for the Environment, Transport and the Regions | |
| Secretary of State for Transport | 29 May 2002 | Secretary of State for Transport, Local Government and the Regions | | | |
| Secretary of State for Environment, Food and Rural Affairs | 8 June 2001 | Secretary of State for the Environment, Transport and the Regions | | | |
| Secretary of State for Education | 10 April 1992 | Secretary of State for Education and Science | 5 July 1995 | Secretary of State for Education and Employment | |
| Secretary of State for Education | 12 May 2010 | Secretary of State for Children, Schools and Families; Secretary of State for Innovation, Universities and Skills | | | |
| Secretary of State for Culture, Media and Sport | 22 July 1997 | Secretary of State for National Heritage | 11 May 2010 | Secretary of State for Culture, Olympics, Media and Sport | |
| Secretary of State for Culture, Media and Sport | 4 September 2012 | Secretary of State for Culture, Olympics, Media and Sport | 3 July 2017 | Secretary of State for Digital, Culture, Media and Sport | |
| Secretary of State for Culture, Media and Sport | 7 February 2023 | Secretary of State for Digital, Culture, Media and Sport | | | |
| Secretary of State for Work and Pensions | 8 June 2001 | Secretary of State for Social Security | | | |
| Secretary of State for Justice | 9 May 2007 | Secretary of State for Constitutional Affairs | | | |
| Secretary of State for Health and Social Care | 8 January 2018 | Secretary of State for Health | | | |
| Secretary of State for Foreign, Commonwealth and Development Affairs | 2 September 2020 | Secretary of State for Foreign and Commonwealth Affairs; Secretary of State for International Development | | | |
| Secretary of State for Housing, Communities and Local Government | 8 January 2018 | Secretary of State for Communities and Local Government | 19 September 2021 | Secretary of State for Levelling Up, Housing and Communities | |
| Secretary of State for Housing, Communities and Local Government | 5 July 2024 | Secretary of State for Levelling Up, Housing and Communities | | | |
| Secretary of State for Energy Security and Net Zero | 7 February 2023 | Secretary of State for Business, Energy and Industrial Strategy | | | |
| Secretary of State for Business, Innovation, Science and Trade | 20 July 2026 | Secretary of State for Science, Innovation and Technology; Secretary of State for Business and Trade | | | |

== Secretaries of state no longer in use ==
Secretaries of state no longer in use
| Office | Created | Created from | Dissolved | Dissolved into | Ref(s) |
|---|---|---|---|---|---|
| Secretary of State for the Northern Department | 1689 | Secretary of State | 1782 | Secretary of State for Foreign Affairs; Secretary of State for the Home Department | |
| Secretary of State for the Southern Department | 1689 | Secretary of State | 1782 | Secretary of State for Foreign Affairs; Secretary of State for the Home Department | |
| Secretary of State for the Colonies | 1768 | | 1782 | Secretary of State for the Home Department | |
| Secretary of State for the Colonies | 1854 | Secretary of State for War and the Colonies | 1966 | Secretary of State for Commonwealth Affairs | |
| Secretary of State for Foreign Affairs | 1782 | Secretary of State for the Northern Department; Secretary of State for the Southern Department | 1968 | Secretary of State for Foreign and Commonwealth Affairs | |
| Secretary of State for War | 1794 | | 1801 | Secretary of State for War and the Colonies | |
| Secretary of State for War | 1854 | Secretary of State for War and the Colonies | 1964 | Secretary of State for Defence | |
| Secretary of State for War and the Colonies | 1801 | Secretary of State for the Home Department; Secretary of State for War | 1854 | Secretary of State for the Colonies; Secretary of State for War | |
| Secretary of State for India | 1858 | President of the Board of Control | 1937 | Secretary of State for India and Burma | |
| Secretary of State for Air | 1919 | | 1964 | Secretary of State for Defence | |
| Secretary of State for the Dominions | 1925 | | | | |
| Secretary of State for India and Burma | 1937 | Secretary of State for India | 1947 | Secretary of State for Burma | |
| Secretary of State for Burma | 1947 | Secretary of State for India and Burma | 1948 | | |
| Secretary of State for Commonwealth Relations | 1947 | | 1966 | Secretary of State for Commonwealth Affairs | |
| Secretary of State for the Co-Ordination of Transport, Fuel and Power | 1951 | | 1953 | | |
| Secretary of State for Commonwealth Affairs | 1966 | Secretary of State for Commonwealth Relations | 1968 | Secretary of State for Foreign, Commonwealth and Development Affairs | |
| Secretary of State for Economic Affairs | 1964 | | 1969 | | |
| Secretary of State for Education and Science | 1964 | Minister of Education; Minister for Science | 1992 | Secretary of State for Education | |
| Secretary of State for Employment and Productivity | 1968 | | 1970 | Secretary of State for Employment | |
| Secretary of State for Social Services | 1968 | Minister of Health; Minister of Social Security | 1988 | Secretary of State for Health; Secretary of State for Social Security | |
| Secretary of State for Foreign and Commonwealth Affairs | 1968 | Secretary of State for Foreign Affairs | 2020 | | |
| Secretary of State for Local Government and Regional Planning | 1969 | | 1970 | | |
| Secretary of State for Employment | 1970 | | 1995 | Secretary of State for Education and Employment | |
| Secretary of State for the Environment | 1970 | | 1997 | Secretary of State for Environment, Transport and the Regions | |
| Secretary of State for Trade and Industry | 1970 | | 1974 | Secretary of State for Trade; Secretary of State for Industry | |
| Secretary of State for Trade and Industry | 1983 | Secretary of State for Trade; Secretary of State for Industry | 2007 | Secretary of State for Business, Enterprise and Regulatory Reform | |
| Secretary of State for Prices and Consumer Protection | 1974 | | 1979 | Secretary of State for Trade | |
| Secretary of State for Social Security | 1988 | | 2001 | Secretary of State for Work and Pensions | |
| Secretary of State for International Development | 1997 | | 2020 | Secretary of State for Foreign, Commonwealth and Development Affairs | |
| Secretary of State for Constitutional Affairs | 2003 | Secretary of State for the Home Department; Lord Chancellor's Department | 2007 | Secretary of State for Justice | |
| Secretary of State for Business, Enterprise and Regulatory Reform | 2007 | Secretary of State for Trade and Industry | 2009 | Secretary of State for Business, Innovation and Skills | |
| Secretary of State for Exiting the European Union | 2016 | | 2020 | | |
| Secretary of State in the Cabinet Office | 2023 | | 2024 | | |
| Secretary of State for Levelling Up, Housing and Communities | 2021 | Secretary of State for Housing, Communities and Local Government | 2024 | Secretary of State for Housing, Communities and Local Government | |
| Secretary of State for Science, Innovation and Technology | 7 February 2023 | Secretary of State for Business, Energy and Industrial Strategy; Secretary of State for Digital, Culture, Media and Sport | 2026 | Secretary of State for Business, Innovation, Science and Trade | |
| Secretary of State for Business and Trade | 7 February 2023 | Secretary of State for Business, Energy and Industrial Strategy; Secretary of State for International Trade | 2026 | Secretary of State for Business, Innovation, Science and Trade | |

=== Health, education, work, business, energy, environment, transport and the regions ===
The secretaries of state that have been used for the matters of health, education, work, business, energy, environment, transport and the regions are shown in the graphic below. It shows how portfolios of responsibilities have been broadly passed down from one secretary of state position to the position(s) directly below it. However, it is impossible for such a graphic to be completely accurate; it cannot show smaller changes, or gains or losses of responsibilities within a position due to changes of responsibilities for the UK Government (for example, due to devolution or Brexit). It is not to scale. In the gaps, and before the first of these secretaries of state, relevant responsibilities were taken on by ministers not titled 'Secretary of State'.

| 1963 | | | | | | Secretary of State for Industry, Trade and Regional Development (1963–64) | | | | | | |
| 1964 | | | | Secretary of State for Education and Science (1964–1992) | | | | | | | | |
| 1968 | Secretary of State for Health and Social Services (1968–1988) | | Secretary of State for Employment and Productivity (1968–1970) | Secretary of State for Education and Science (1964–1992) | | | | | | | | |
| 1969 | Secretary of State for Health and Social Services (1968–1988) | | Secretary of State for Employment and Productivity (1968–1970) | Secretary of State for Education and Science (1964–1992) | | | | | | | Secretary of State for Local Government and Regional Planning (1969–70) | |
| 1970 | Secretary of State for Health and Social Services (1968–1988) | | Secretary of State for Employment (1970–1995) | Secretary of State for Education and Science (1964–1992) | | Secretary of State for Trade and Industry (1970–74) | | | | | | |
| 1974 | Secretary of State for Health and Social Services (1968–1988) | | Secretary of State for Employment (1970–1995) | Secretary of State for Education and Science (1964–1992) | | Secretary of State for Industry (1974–1983) | Secretary of State for Trade (1974–83) | Secretary of State for Prices and Consumer Protection (1974–1979) | Secretary of State for Energy (1974–1992) | | | |
| 1976 | Secretary of State for Health and Social Services (1968–1988) | | Secretary of State for Employment (1970–1995) | Secretary of State for Education and Science (1964–1992) | | Secretary of State for Industry (1974–1983) | Secretary of State for Trade (1974–83) | Secretary of State for Prices and Consumer Protection (1974–1979) | Secretary of State for Energy (1974–1992) | Secretary of State for the Environment (1970–1997) | | Secretary of State for Transport (1976–1979) |
| 1979 | Secretary of State for Health and Social Services (1968–1988) | | Secretary of State for Employment (1970–1995) | Secretary of State for Education and Science (1964–1992) | | Secretary of State for Industry (1974–1983) | | | Secretary of State for Energy (1974–1992) | | | |
| 1981 | Secretary of State for Health and Social Services (1968–1988) | | Secretary of State for Employment (1970–1995) | Secretary of State for Education and Science (1964–1992) | | Secretary of State for Industry (1974–1983) | | | Secretary of State for Energy (1974–1992) | | | Secretary of State for Transport (1981–1997) |
| 1983 | Secretary of State for Health and Social Services (1968–1988) | | Secretary of State for Employment (1970–1995) | Secretary of State for Education and Science (1964–1992) | | | | | Secretary of State for Energy (1974–1992) | | | Secretary of State for Transport (1981–1997) |
| 1988 | Secretary of State for Health (1988–2018) | Secretary of State for Social Security (1988–2001) | Secretary of State for Employment (1970–1995) | Secretary of State for Education and Science (1964–1992) | | | | | Secretary of State for Energy (1974–1992) | | | Secretary of State for Transport (1981–1997) |
| 1992 | Secretary of State for Health (1988–2018) | Secretary of State for Social Security (1988–2001) | Secretary of State for Employment (1970–1995) | Secretary of State for Education (1992–1995) | | Secretary of State for Trade and Industry (1983–2007) | | | | | | Secretary of State for Transport (1981–1997) |
| 1995 | Secretary of State for Health (1988–2018) | Secretary of State for Social Security (1988–2001) | Secretary of State for Education and Employment (1995–2001) | | | Secretary of State for Trade and Industry (1983–2007) | | | | | | Secretary of State for Transport (1981–1997) |
| 1997 | Secretary of State for Health (1988–2018) | Secretary of State for Social Security (1988–2001) | Secretary of State for Education and Employment (1995–2001) | | | Secretary of State for Trade and Industry (1983–2007) | | | | Secretary of State for the Environment, Transport and the Regions (1997–2001) | | |
| 2001 | Secretary of State for Health (1988–2018) | Secretary of State for Work and Pensions (2001–present) | | Secretary of State for Education and Skills (2001–2007) | | Secretary of State for Trade and Industry (1983–2007) | | | | Secretary of State for the Environment, Food and Rural Affairs (2001–present) | Secretary of State for Transport, Local Government and the Regions (2001–02) | |
| 2002 | Secretary of State for Health (1988–2018) | Secretary of State for Work and Pensions (2001–present) | | Secretary of State for Education and Skills (2001–2007) | | Secretary of State for Trade and Industry (1983–2007) | | | | Secretary of State for the Environment, Food and Rural Affairs (2001–present) | | Secretary of State for Transport (2002–present) |
| 2006 | Secretary of State for Health (1988–2018) | Secretary of State for Work and Pensions (2001–present) | | Secretary of State for Education and Skills (2001–2007) | | Secretary of State for Trade and Industry (1983–2007) | | | | Secretary of State for the Environment, Food and Rural Affairs (2001–present) | Secretary of State for Communities and Local Government (2006–18) | Secretary of State for Transport (2002–present) |
| 2007 | Secretary of State for Health (1988–2018) | Secretary of State for Work and Pensions (2001–present) | | Secretary of State for Children, Schools and Families (2007–10) | Secretary of State for Innovation, Universities and Skills (2007–2009) | Secretary of State for Business, Enterprise and Regulatory Reform (2007–2009) | | | | Secretary of State for the Environment, Food and Rural Affairs (2001–present) | Secretary of State for Communities and Local Government (2006–18) | Secretary of State for Transport (2002–present) |
| 2008 | Secretary of State for Health (1988–2018) | Secretary of State for Work and Pensions (2001–present) | | Secretary of State for Children, Schools and Families (2007–10) | Secretary of State for Innovation, Universities and Skills (2007–2009) | | | | Secretary of State for Energy and Climate Change (2008–2016) | | Secretary of State for Communities and Local Government (2006–18) | Secretary of State for Transport (2002–present) |
| 2009 | Secretary of State for Health (1988–2018) | Secretary of State for Work and Pensions (2001–present) | | Secretary of State for Children, Schools and Families (2007–10) | Secretary of State for Business, Innovation and Skills (2009–2016) | | | | Secretary of State for Energy and Climate Change (2008–2016) | | Secretary of State for Communities and Local Government (2006–18) | Secretary of State for Transport (2002–present) |
| 2010 | Secretary of State for Health (1988–2018) | Secretary of State for Work and Pensions (2001–present) | | | Secretary of State for Business, Innovation and Skills (2009–2016) | | | | Secretary of State for Energy and Climate Change (2008–2016) | | Secretary of State for Communities and Local Government (2006–18) | Secretary of State for Transport (2002–present) |
| 2016 | Secretary of State for Health (1988–2018) | Secretary of State for Work and Pensions (2001–present) | | | | Secretary of State for International Trade (2016–2023) | Secretary of State for Business, Energy and Industrial Strategy (2016–2023) | | | | Secretary of State for Communities and Local Government (2006–18) | Secretary of State for Transport (2002–present) |
| 2018 | Secretary of State for Health and Social Care (2018–present) | Secretary of State for Work and Pensions (2001–present) | | Secretary of State for Education (2010–present) | | Secretary of State for International Trade (2016–2023) | Secretary of State for Business, Energy and Industrial Strategy (2016–2023) | | | | Secretary of State for Housing, Communities and Local Government (2018–2021) | Secretary of State for Transport (2002–present) |
| 2021 | Secretary of State for Health and Social Care (2018–present) | Secretary of State for Work and Pensions (2001–present) | | Secretary of State for Education (2010–present) | | Secretary of State for International Trade (2016–2023) | Secretary of State for Business, Energy and Industrial Strategy (2016–2023) | | | | Secretary of State for Levelling Up, Housing and Communities (2021–2024) | Secretary of State for Transport (2002–present) |
| 2023 | Secretary of State for Health and Social Care (2018–present) | Secretary of State for Work and Pensions (2001–present) | | Secretary of State for Education (2010–present) | | Secretary of State for Business and Trade (2023–2026) | | Secretary of State for Science, Innovation and Technology (2023–2026) | Secretary of State for Energy Security and Net Zero (2023–present) | | Secretary of State for Levelling Up, Housing and Communities (2021–2024) | Secretary of State for Transport (2002–present) |
| 2024 | Secretary of State for Health and Social Care (2018–present) | Secretary of State for Work and Pensions (2001–present) | | Secretary of State for Education (2010–present) | | Secretary of State for Business and Trade (2023–2026) | | Secretary of State for Science, Innovation and Technology (2023–2026) | Secretary of State for Energy Security and Net Zero (2023–present) | | Secretary of State for Housing, Communities and Local Government (2024–present) | Secretary of State for Transport (2002–present) |
| 2026 | Secretary of State for Health and Social Care (2018–present) | Secretary of State for Work and Pensions (2001–present) | | Secretary of State for Education (2010–present) | | Secretary of State for Business, Innovation, Science and Trade (2026–present) | | | Secretary of State for Energy Security and Net Zero (2023–present) | | Secretary of State for Housing, Communities and Local Government (2024–present) | Secretary of State for Transport (2002–present) |

Key:

| Secretary of state primarily relating to health |
| Secretary of state primarily relating to work and benefits |
| Secretary of state primarily relating to education |
| Secretary of state primarily relating to business |
| Secretary of state primarily relating to energy |
| Secretary of state primarily relating to the regions |
| Secretary of state primarily relating to transport |
| Secretary of state covering more than one of these areas |
| Secretary of state currently in use |

=== Culture ===
The Secretaries of state that have been used for culture, heritage and sport are as follows:

Secretary of State for National Heritage (1992–1997)
Secretary of State for Culture, Media and Sport (1997–2010)
Secretary of State for Culture, Olympics, Media and Sport (2010–2012)
Secretary of State for Culture, Media and Sport (2012–2017)
Secretary of State for Digital, Culture, Media and Sport (2017–2023)
Secretary of State for Culture, Media and Sport (2023–2026)
Secretary of State for Digital, Culture, Media and Sport (2026–present)
