= February 2023 British cabinet reshuffle =

First cabinet reshuffle undertaken by UK Prime Minister Rishi Sunak

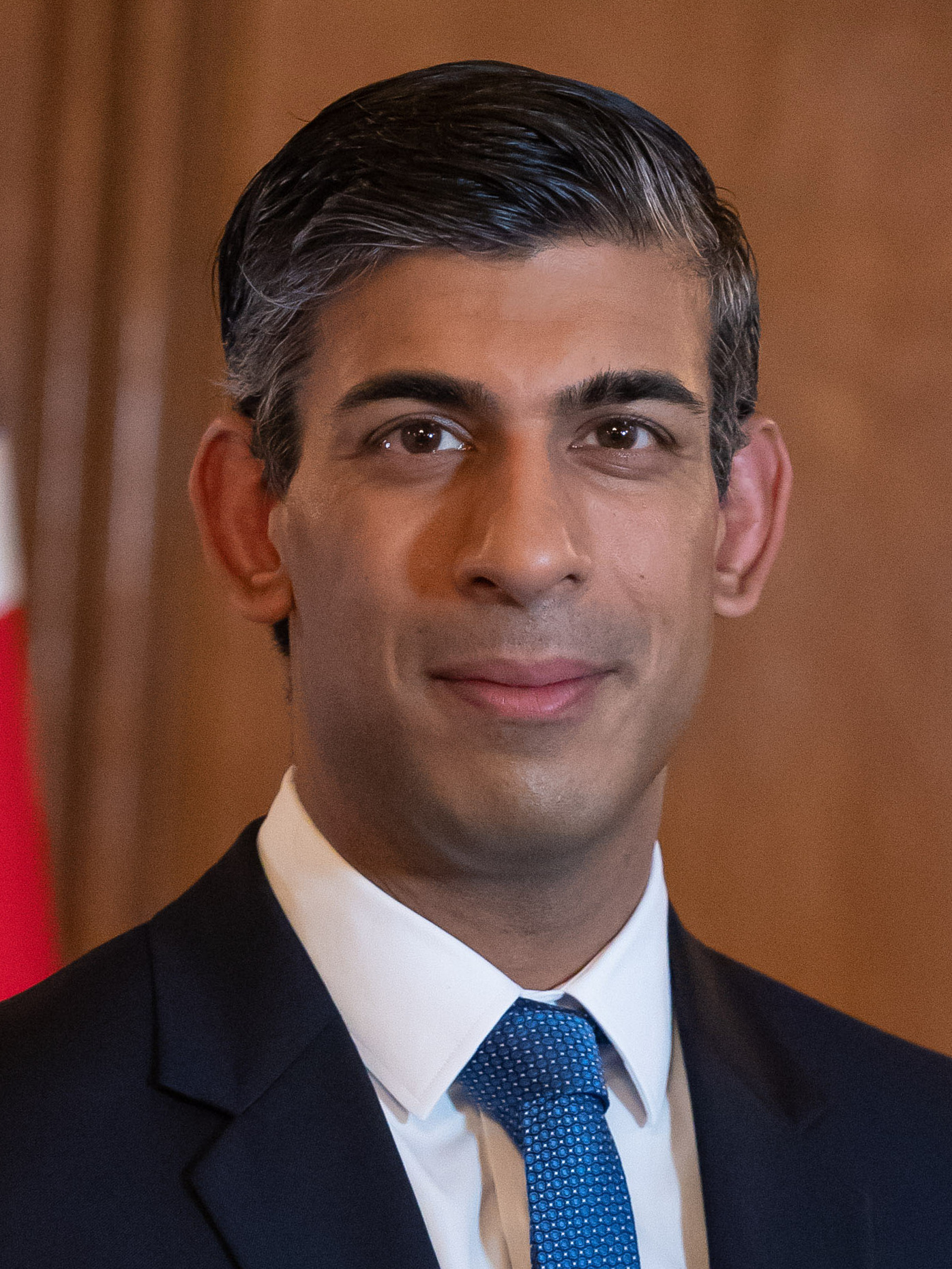
Rishi Sunak

Former British Prime Minister Rishi Sunak carried out the first cabinet reshuffle of his premiership on 7 February 2023. The reshuffle saw a significant restructuring of a number of government departments, and gave Sunak the opportunity to fill the vacancy left by Nadhim Zahawi after he was dismissed as Chairman of the Conservative Party and Minister without Portfolio on 29 January 2023, following a scandal surrounding his tax affairs.

The reshuffle saw a significant restructuring of government departments. The Department for International Trade and the Department for Business, Energy and Industrial Strategy (BEIS) were merged to form the new Department for Business and Trade. The energy and climate policy responsibilities of BEIS were spun off to form the new Department for Energy Security and Net Zero. The science and innovation policies of BEIS were combined with the digital portfolio of the former Department for Digital, Culture, Media and Sport (DCMS) to form the new Department for Science, Innovation and Technology. The DCMS continues as the newly constituted Department for Culture, Media and Sport.

== Cabinet-level changes ==
Colour key
- Joined the Cabinet
- Portfolio created or merged

Minister	Position before reshuffle	Position after reshuffle
Rt Hon Greg Hands MP	Minister of State for Trade Policy	Chairman of the Conservative Party; Minister without Portfolio
Rt Hon Grant Shapps MP	Secretary of State for Business, Energy and Industrial Strategy	Secretary of State for Energy Security and Net Zero
Rt Hon Kemi Badenoch MP	Secretary of State for International Trade; President of the Board of Trade	Secretary of State for Business and Trade; President of the Board of Trade
Rt Hon Michelle Donelan MP	Secretary of State for Digital, Culture, Media and Sport	Secretary of State for Science, Innovation and Technology
Rt Hon Lucy Frazer KC MP	Minister of State for Housing and Planning	Secretary of State for Culture, Media and Sport
Rt Hon Oliver Dowden MP	Chancellor of the Duchy of Lancaster	Secretary of State in the Cabinet Office; Chancellor of the Duchy of Lancaster

== Junior ministerial changes ==
Colour key
- Promoted (Note: According to the ministerial pay scale: Parliamentary Private Secretary < Parliamentary Under-Secretary of State < Minister of State)

Minister	Department before reshuffle	Department after reshuffle
Rachel Maclean MP	Backbench MP	Levelling Up, Housing and Communities
Rt Hon Graham Stuart MP	Business, Energy and Industrial Strategy	Energy Security and Net Zero
George Freeman MP	Business, Energy and Industrial Strategy	Science, Innovation and Technology
Nus Ghani MP	Business, Energy and Industrial Strategy	Business and Trade
Kevin Hollinrake MP	Business, Energy and Industrial Strategy	Business and Trade
Nigel Huddleston MP	International Trade	Business and Trade
Maria Caulfield MP	International Trade	Business and Trade
Andrew Bowie MP	International Trade	Energy Security and Net Zero
Paul Scully MP	Digital, Culture, Media and Sport	Science, Innovation and Technology

== Whips' Office appointments ==
Whip	Previous position	New position
Stuart Anderson MP	Assistant Government Whip	Lord Commissioner of HM Treasury
Ruth Edwards MP	Backbench MP	Assistant Government Whip

== Conservative Party appointments ==
Appointee	Position before appointment	New party position
Lee Anderson MP	Backbench MP	Deputy Chairman of the Conservative Party

== See also ==
- Sunak ministry
- Premiership of Rishi Sunak
- 2023 in politics and government
