= Liz Kendall =

British politician (born 1971)

The Right Honourable Liz Kendall MP
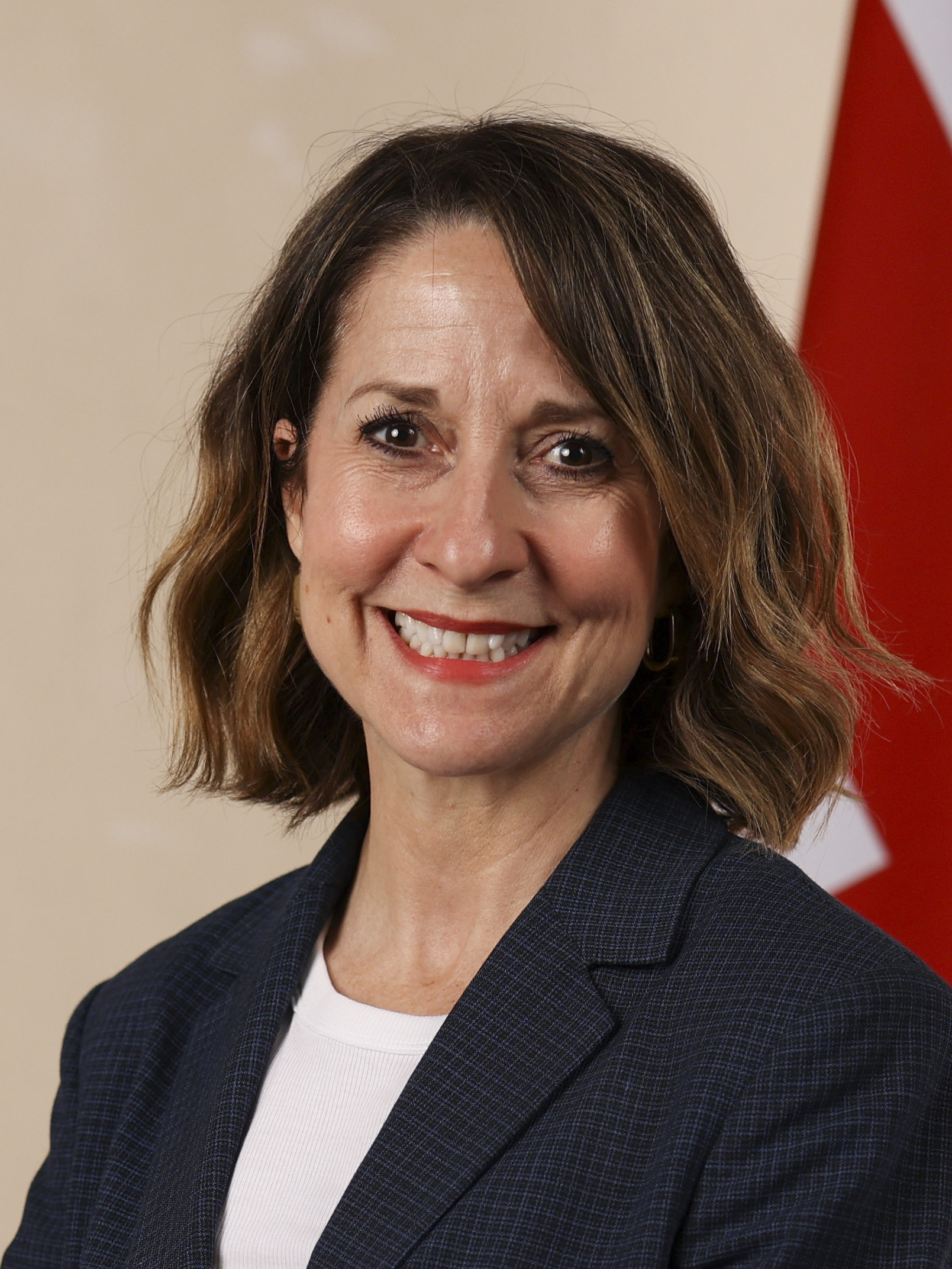
- Official portrait, 2024

Secretary of State for Science, Innovation and Technology
- In office 5 September 2025 – 20 July 2026
- Prime Minister: Keir Starmer
- Preceded by: Peter Kyle
- Succeeded by: Office abolished

Secretary of State for Work and Pensions
- In office 5 July 2024 – 5 September 2025
- Prime Minister: Keir Starmer
- Preceded by: Mel Stride
- Succeeded by: Pat McFadden
Shadow portfolios
Shadow Secretary of State for Work and Pensions
In office 4 September 2023 – 5 July 2024
Leader	Keir Starmer
Preceded by	Jonathan Ashworth
Succeeded by	Mel Stride
Shadow Minister for Social Care (Note: Care and Older People (2011–15))
In office 9 April 2020 – 4 September 2023
Leader	Keir Starmer
Preceded by	Paula Sherriff
Succeeded by	Andrew Gwynne
In office 7 October 2011 – 12 September 2015
Leader	Ed Miliband; Harriet Harman (acting)
Preceded by	Emily Thornberry
Succeeded by	Barbara Keeley

Member of Parliament for Leicester West
- Incumbent
- Assumed office 6 May 2010
- Preceded by: Patricia Hewitt
- Majority: 8,777 (24.8%)

Personal details
- Born: Elizabeth Louise Kendall; 11 June 1971 (age 55) Abbots Langley, Hertfordshire, England
- Party: Labour
- Children: 1
- Education: Queens' College, Cambridge
- Website: Official website

Elizabeth Louise Kendall (born 11 June 1971) is a British politician who served as Secretary of State for Work and Pensions from 2024 to 2025 and as Secretary of State for Science, Innovation and Technology from 2025 to 2026. A member of the Labour Party, she has been the Member of Parliament (MP) for Leicester West since 2010.

Born in Abbots Langley, Kendall attended Watford Grammar School for Girls. She studied at the University of Cambridge and began her career at the Institute for Public Policy Research (IPPR). She became a political adviser to Harriet Harman in 1996 and a special adviser to Harman in the Department for Social Security following the 1997 general election. She left the role after Harman was dismissed from the government the following year. Kendall unsuccessfully stood for the Chesterfield constituency at the 2001 general election. The same year, she returned to government to work for Patricia Hewitt at the Department for Trade and Industry, and then followed her to the Department for Health. After Hewitt left government, Kendall became the Director of the Ambulance Services Network, where she remained until 2010.

Kendal was elected to Parliament at the 2010 general election for Leicester West. The following year, she was appointed to a shadow cabinet-attending role as Shadow Minister for Care and Older People under Ed Miliband. After Labour's defeat at the 2015 general election, she stood in the leadership election to replace Miliband, but finished in last place, behind Jeremy Corbyn. She subsequently returned to the backbenches and supported Owen Smith in a failed attempt to replace Corbyn in 2016. She was reelected in both the 2017 and 2019 general elections. Upon the election of Keir Starmer as Labour leader in 2020, Kendall returned to the frontbench as shadow social care minister. In the 2023 shadow cabinet reshuffle, she was promoted to the shadow cabinet as shadow work and pensions secretary.

Following Labour's victory in the 2024 general election, Kendall was appointed to government as Secretary of State for Work and Pensions by Starmer in his ministry. In the 2025 cabinet reshuffle, she was appointed Secretary of State for Science, Innovation and Technology. She was dismissed from the government by Andy Burnham and returned to the backbenches in 2026.

== Early life and career ==
Elizabeth Kendall was born on 11 June 1971 in Abbots Langley, Hertfordshire. She attended Watford Grammar School for Girls, alongside Geri Halliwell. Her father, Richard, left school at 16 and studied finance before going on to be a senior official at the Bank of England. Her mother was a primary school teacher. As children, Kendall and her brother were encouraged to talk about politics and to get involved in community activism. Having originally been a Labour voter, her father became a Liberal councillor in 1979. Her mother was a school governor and Kendall's first political campaign was for a local zebra crossing. After leaving school, she attended Queens' College, Cambridge, graduating with first class honours in history in 1993.

Kendall joined the Labour Party in 1992 and, after graduating from Cambridge, worked at the Institute for Public Policy Research (IPPR) in the area of child development and early years learning. In 1996, she became a political adviser to Harriet Harman, and then became Harman's government special adviser in the Department for Social Security after Labour won the 1997 general election and Harman became a government minister.

In 1998, when Harman was sacked from the government, Kendall resigned and was awarded a fellowship by the King's Fund, a health charity. She also wrote a series of research papers for the IPPR and was appointed as the Director of the Maternity Alliance, a charity for pregnant women. She was unsuccessful in an attempt to be selected as Labour's prospective parliamentary candidate for Chesterfield at the 2001 general election, following the retirement of Tony Benn.

In 2001, she returned to government to work for Patricia Hewitt, at the Department for Trade and Industry, and then followed her to the Department for Health, where she was involved in bringing in the smoking ban in 2006. After Hewitt left government, Kendall became the Director of the Ambulance Services Network, where she remained until 2010.

== Parliamentary career ==
At the 2010 general election, Kendall was elected to Parliament as MP for Leicester West with 38.4% of the vote and a majority of 4,017. She made her maiden speech in a debate on tackling poverty in the UK on 10 June 2010.

=== Early career, 2010–2015 ===
She was briefly a member of the Education Select Committee between July 2010 and October 2010. She supported David Miliband for the leadership of the Labour Party in 2010.

In Ed Miliband's first reshuffle in October 2010, she joined the Opposition frontbench as Shadow Junior Health Minister where she served under John Healey. In 2011, she contributed along with other Labour MPs and former Labour ministers to The Purple Book, in which she wrote a chapter on the early years and health and social care where she proposed a "Teach Early Years First" scheme. Later that year, she was appointed to the new role of Shadow Minister for Care and Older People and became an attending member of the shadow cabinet.

Kendall was re-elected as MP for Leicester West at the 2015 general election with an increased vote share of 46.5% and an increased majority of 7,203.

=== Labour Party leadership candidature ===
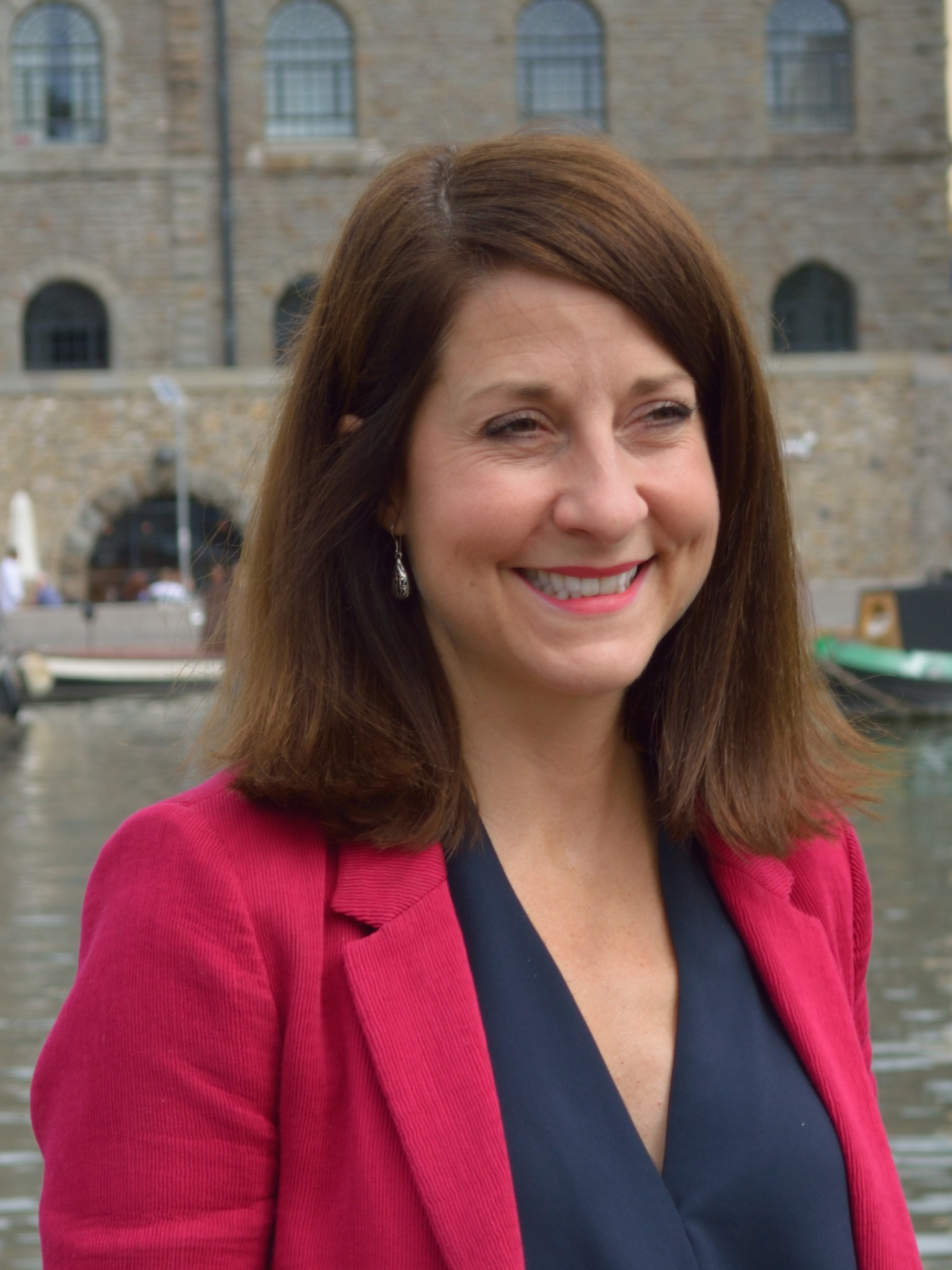
Kendall before a 2015 Labour Party leadership election meeting in Bristol

On 10 May 2015, Kendall announced that she was standing as a successor to Ed Miliband for the Labour Party leadership following their defeat in the 2015 general election. Kendall was regarded by many in the media as the Blairite candidate, though Kendall stated she would like to be known as the "modernising candidate". Her leadership bid was supported by Shadow Cabinet colleagues Ivan Lewis, Chuka Umunna, Tristram Hunt, Emma Reynolds and Gloria De Piero. Senior Labour politicians supporting her included Alan Milburn, Alistair Darling, John Hutton and John Reid. She also had the support of the Blue Labour Group within the Labour Party including figures such as Maurice Glasman and Rowenna Davis.

In June 2015, Kendall's leadership bid received praise from The Sun, who said that she is the "only prayer they [the Labour Party] have". The Sun also praised her for saying "the country comes first" in response to Andy Burnham who said "the Labour Party always comes first" in the Newsnight Labour leadership hustings. Commentators from across the political spectrum said that Kendall was the leadership candidate the Conservatives would "fear the most". This claim was even re-stated by some Conservative politicians including George Osborne, Boris Johnson, Ruth Davidson, Anna Soubry and Philip Davies.

Ultimately, Kendall finished 4th in the election, obtaining 4.5% (18,857) of the vote.

=== Resignation from the Shadow Cabinet ===
Kendall resigned from the Shadow Cabinet following the election of Jeremy Corbyn as Labour leader in September 2015. She supported Owen Smith in the failed attempt to replace Jeremy Corbyn in the 2016 Labour leadership election.

At the snap 2017 general election, Kendall was again re-elected with an increased vote share of 60.8% and an increased majority of 11,060.

In August 2017, James Chapman, former Director of Communications at HM Treasury under George Osborne, said, "We really need Liz Kendall to be the leader of [a] new centre party". Chapman had already tweeted his proposals for a new centrist political party opposed to Brexit, 'The Democrats'. After stepping down from frontline politics, Kendall was a regular guest on BBC current affairs programme This Week until its cancellation in July 2019.

Kendall was again re-elected at the 2019 general election, with a decreased vote share of 49.7% and a decreased majority of 4,212.

=== Return to frontbench ===
Keir Starmer reappointed Kendall to the frontbench after winning the 2020 Labour leadership election. Following the November 2021 shadow cabinet reshuffle, it was announced that Karin Smyth would cover her duties while Kendall was on maternity leave.

On 4 September 2023, she was appointed Shadow Secretary of State for Work and Pensions by Starmer as part of the 2023 British shadow cabinet reshuffle.

=== Work and Pensions Secretary (2024–2025) ===
At the 2024 general election, Kendall was again re-elected, with a decreased vote share of 44.6% and an increased majority of 8,777. In the aftermath of the election, Kendall was appointed as Secretary of State for Work and Pensions by Prime Minister Keir Starmer. She was appointed to the Privy Council and sworn into ministerial office on 6 July.

Following her appointment as Work and Pensions Secretary, Kendall initiated a series of reforms aimed at reshaping the UK’s welfare system. One of her primary objectives was to shift the Department for Work and Pensions from merely administering benefits to actively promoting employment. In a speech in Barnsley, Kendall said the need to address factors such as health, skills, childcare, and transport, which significantly influence individuals ability to secure and maintain employment.

Kendall proposed the "Youth Guarantee" for 18 to 21-year-olds, designed to ensure that young people are either earning or learning. This program offers opportunities for training or employment, with the stipulation that refusal to participate could result in benefit reductions. Kendall noted the importance of early career engagement, saying that unemployment during youth can have long-term detrimental effects on job prospects and earning potential.

A significant aspect of Kendall’s reform agenda involved tightening eligibility criteria for Personal Independence Payments (PIP) and incapacity benefits. These measures aimed to save approximately £5 billion annually by the end of the decade. The proposed changes were expected to affect around one million people, particularly those with mental health conditions and minor physical difficulties.

The proposed disability benefits reforms sparked considerable debate. Disability charities and opposition parties criticized the cuts, labeling them as devastating and immoral. Organisations such as the Disability Benefits Consortium, Scope, and Mind argued that these changes could push disabled individuals further into poverty and exacerbate health issues, highlighting the potential social impact of the reforms.

In response to the criticisms, Kendall emphasised the need for a balanced approach that ensured fiscal responsibility while protecting vulnerable populations. She acknowledged the concerns raised by disability advocates and noted the importance of reinvesting savings into employment programs to support those on health-related benefits, aiming to create a more equitable system.

On 1/7/25 Kendall's proposed bill was severely watered down, following backbench pressure, before being passed.

Kendall's tenure in Work & Pensions was marked by internal party challenges, as some Labour MPs expressed apprehension regarding the impact of welfare reforms on disadvantaged communities. The historical context of previous welfare cuts served as a cautionary backdrop, prompting calls for the party to uphold its commitment to social justice while pursuing necessary fiscal reforms.

=== Science Secretary (2025–2026) ===
In the 2025 British cabinet reshuffle, Kendall was appointed Secretary of State for Science, Innovation and Technology, replacing Peter Kyle. On 20 July 2026, she was dismissed by Andy Burnham.

== Political views ==
=== Economic and fiscal policy ===
During her leadership campaign in 2015, Kendall committed herself to the living wage and said the Low Pay Commission's remit should be extended to encourage more firms to pay it. She also said she would end the exploitation of care workers by preventing firms from docking the cost of uniform and travel time from their wages. She has also come out in support of worker representation on company boards as part of her plans for economic reform. After the Budget, Kendall commissioned the former minister Margaret Hodge, to undertake a review into the £100bn tax reliefs that firms are entitled to.

=== Defence and foreign policy ===
Kendall is a pro-European and has spoken in favour of rejoining the European Union. She supported an in/out referendum on Britain's membership of the EU, and wanted the Labour Party to play a leading role in a cross-party Yes to Europe campaign. Kendall also backed the NATO target to spend at least 2% of GDP on defence. She is in favour of renewing Britain's Trident nuclear submarines.

Kendall supports a two-state solution, but in 2015 she abstained on a motion recognising the State of Palestine, instead favouring the continuation of the Israeli–Palestinian peace process. She has been a member of Labour Friends of Israel since 2016.

=== Education ===
Kendall has spoken about education as a way of tackling inequality. She has spoken in support of expanding the academies programme and keeping the free schools initiative saying that focus should be on the quality of education rather than structures and that investment in the early years should be a priority over cutting university tuition fees. Kendall also said that more effort was needed in the education system to raise aspiration for the 'white working class young'. Kendall has also said that as Prime Minister, she would order a review of National Lottery Funding to free up funds for early years services.

=== Health and welfare ===
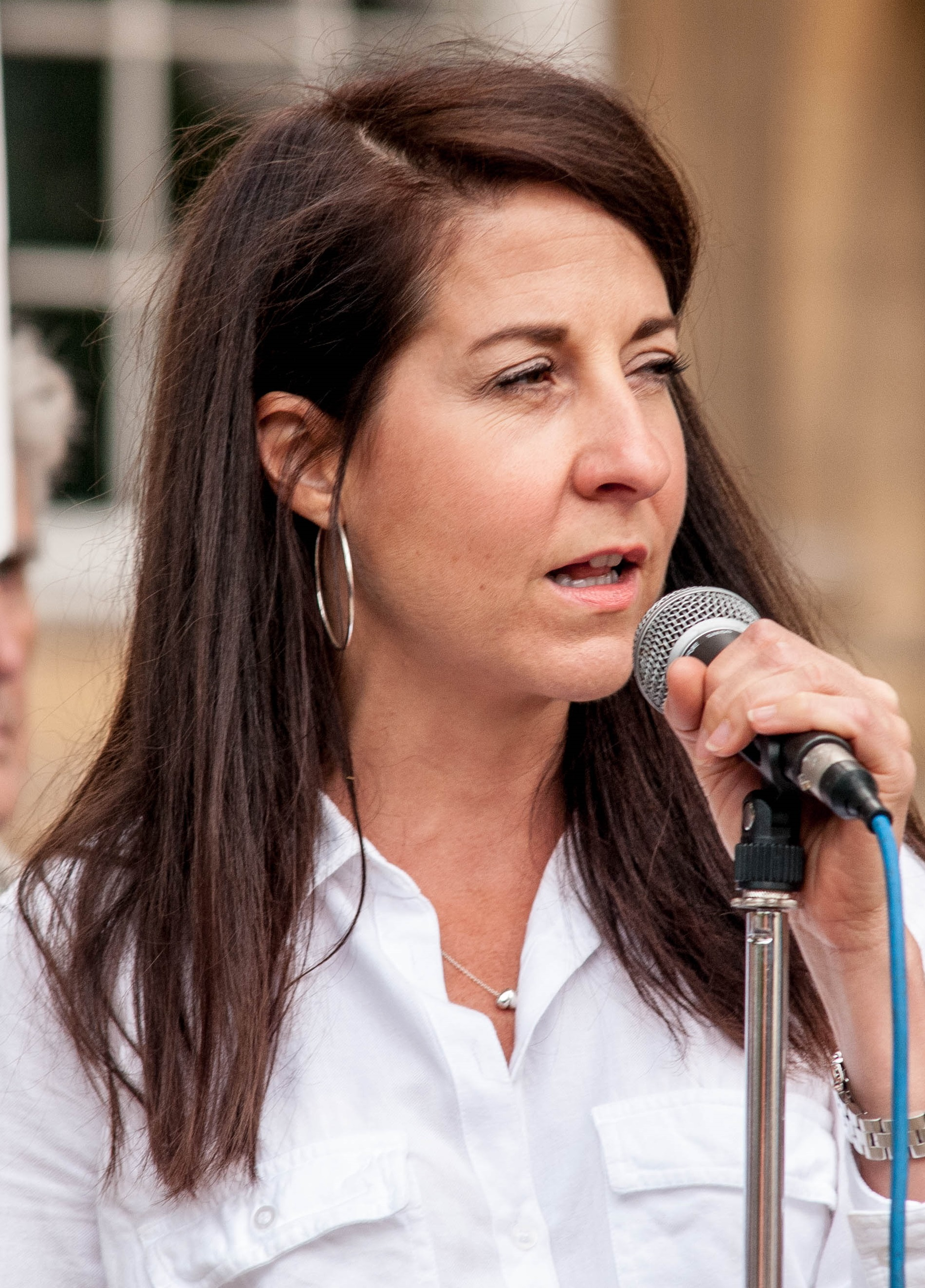
Kendall on a People's march for the NHS in 2014

Kendall has advocated increased patient choice in the NHS, arguing "there will remain a role for the private and voluntary sectors where they can add extra capacity to the NHS or challenges to the system" and with healthcare providers "what matters is what works". In 2015, Kendall supported the £23,000 benefit cap. Kendall also said she backs the principle of the two child benefit cap. In 2024 as Work and Pensions Secretary, Kendall suggested that job coaches could visit inpatients on mental health wards. In February 2025 in Kendall's capacity as Work and Pensions Secretary also expressed that she felt some people on benefits were "taking the Mickey", and that this is a justification for a push to get those on benefits due to less severe illnesses back into work.

=== Immigration ===
Kendall gave some support to David Cameron's proposal that the right of EU migrants to claim tax credits and benefits should be withdrawn, or delayed for a number of years. She supports the current points-based immigration system and backed tough rules on abuse of the immigration system but has pledged not to try and "out-UKIP UKIP" and spoke of the benefits of immigration in her own constituency.

=== Devolution ===
Kendall has supported "radical devolution" to England to deal with the West Lothian question and appointed Tristram Hunt to look at what powers ought to be devolved to England. In July 2015, Kendall came out in favour of English votes for English laws. Her leadership rivals favoured the formation of a constitutional convention to consider the issue. Kendall has also said that Labour must oppose the 'tyranny of the bureaucratic state' but must also share power at every level so that powers are devolved to communities and individuals too.

=== Trade unions ===
Kendall has supported Labour's links with the trade union movement but has said that both the trade unions and the Labour Party have to change. Kendall said that if she became Prime Minister, she would reverse any changes to trade union and employment rights made by the previous Conservative government. Kendall also criticised Len McCluskey for threatening to withdraw funding from the Labour Party were his choice of candidate not to be elected.

=== Social issues ===
Kendall is a supporter of LGBT rights and voted for same sex marriage in 2013. Kendall said under her leadership the Labour Party would have worked with other centre-left parties to end the criminalisation of homosexuality across the world and spoke in favour of Michael Cashman becoming the UK's special envoy on LGBTI issues.

She announced she was in favour of legislation on assisted dying in November 2024. Alongside the Labour government, she announced on 17 December 2024 that the WASPI women would not be compensated as "no evidence of financial loss had been given".

== Personal life ==
Kendall was previously in a relationship with the actor and comedian Greg Davies. They ended their relationship a few months before the 2015 general election. In November 2021, Kendall announced she would take maternity leave in 2022 as she would be having a baby through surrogacy. Her son was born in January 2022.

Kendall is currently in a relationship with Old Etonian and global head of multi-asset solutions at Santander Asset Management, James Ind. She lives in Notting Hill in a Victorian home purchased for £3.9 million in 2021.

Kendall was sworn of the Privy Council on 6 July 2024, entitling her to be styled "The Right Honourable".

== Notes ==
Parliament of the United Kingdom
Preceded by Patricia Hewitt	Member of Parliament for Leicester West; 2010–present	Incumbent
Political offices
Preceded by Emily Thornberry	Shadow Minister for Care and Older People; 2011–2015	Succeeded by Barbara Keeley as Shadow Minister for Older People, Social Care and Carers
Preceded by Paula Sherriff	Shadow Minister for Social Care; 2020–2023	Succeeded by Andrew Gwynne
Preceded by Jonathan Ashworth	Shadow Secretary of State for Work and Pensions; 2023–2024	Succeeded by Mel Stride
Preceded by Mel Stride	Secretary of State for Work and Pensions; 2024–2025	Succeeded by Pat McFadden
Preceded by Peter Kyle	Secretary of State for Science, Innovation and Technology; 2025–2026	Succeeded by Office abolished
