= Department for Energy Security and Net Zero =

UK government department

Department overview
- Formed: 7 February 2023
- Preceding Department: Department for Business, Energy, and Industrial Strategy
- Type: UK Government Department
- Jurisdiction: United Kingdom
- Headquarters: 3-8 Whitehall Place, London
- Secretary of State responsible: Miatta Fahnbulleh MP, Secretary of State for Energy Security and Net Zero
- Department executives: Jonathan Brearley, Permanent Secretary; Clive Maxwell, Second Permanent Secretary
- Child agencies: Ofgem; Civil Nuclear Police Authority; Mining Remediation Authority; Climate Change Committee; Nuclear Decommissioning Authority; Salix Finance Ltd; Committee on Fuel Poverty; Committee on Radioactive Waste Management; Nuclear Liabilities Financing Assurance Board; Great British Energy - Nuclear; North Sea Transition Authority; Commissioner for Shale and Gas; United Kingdom Atomic Energy Authority; National Energy System Operator; Office for Nuclear Regulation; United Kingdom National Nuclear Laboratory; Great British Energy
- Website: gov.uk/desnz

The Department for Energy Security and Net Zero (DESNZ) is a ministerial department of the Government of the United Kingdom. It was established on 7 February 2023 by a cabinet reshuffle under the Rishi Sunak premiership. The new department took on the energy policy responsibilities of the former Department for Business, Energy, and Industrial Strategy (BEIS).

The department's first Secretary of State was Grant Shapps; he was previously the final Secretary of State at BEIS. The current Secretary of State is Miatta Fahnbulleh.

The department is scrutinised by the Energy Security and Net Zero Select Committee.

== History ==
The department was established on 7 February 2023.

The creation of the new department was described by Downing Street as an opportunity to "focus on giving the UK cheaper, cleaner, more secure sources of energy – cutting bills, cutting emissions, and cutting dependence on international energy supplies."

The London School of Economics's Grantham Research Institute on Climate Change and the Environment welcomed the creation of the new department saying that it "signalled a commitment to delivering net zero" and "showed that MPs on the right of the Conservative Party have failed to win the argument for weakening climate policy." However, the LSE warned that the new department would have to "persuade other departments and the Treasury to accelerate action on cutting greenhouse gas emissions across the economy outside the energy sector" to be effective.

== Responsibilities ==
The department's immediate priorities were outlined by the Prime Minister as follows:

- To maintain energy supplies, particularly during the winter.
- To reduce energy bills and lower inflation.
- To ensure the UK is on track to meet its legally binding carbon budgets and Net Zero commitments.
- To speed up significantly the delivery of network infrastructure and green energy.
- To improve the energy efficiency of UK homes, businesses and public sector buildings.
- To deliver a new Energy Bill by the end of the Parliament.

== Ministers ==
DESNZ ministers are as follows, with cabinet members in bold:

Minister	Portrait	Office	Portfolio
**Miatta Fahnbulleh** MP		Secretary of State for Energy Security and Net Zero	Overall responsibility for the department.
Michael Shanks MP		Minister of State for Energy	Clean Power 2030; public control; North Sea transition; energy systems, networks and markets; energy and fuel security, including mid-stream and downstream gas systems; energy planning; policy; nuclear; fusion; renewables; Great British Energy; Energy sector supply chains, and the role of the energy systems and infrastructure in supporting; reindustrialisation; Energy Independence Bill and Nuclear Regulation Bill; Mining Remediation Authority
Katie White MP		Minister of State for Climate Transition	net zero strategy and carbon budgets; Electrification Champion; electric vehicles (EVs) (joint with DfT); international climate and energy policy; G20 climate and energy lead; climate finance, green finance; citizen engagement; carbon markets; climate science; innovation for climate and energy; climate security; methane emissions; biomass sustainability; biomethane, tidal, geothermal
Martin McCluskey MP		Parliamentary Under-Secretary of State for Local Energy and Jobs	devolution and the place-based; economic strategy; Warm Homes Plan; clean heat; consumer protection! heat networks; public sector and non-domestic buildings: Great British Energy Local Power Plan; Office for Clean Energy Jobs; consumer-led flexibility; smart meters; Internal Electricity Market negotiations; AI in the energy sector; Carbon Capture Utilisation and Storage (CCUS) and Hydrogen and Greenhouse Gas Removals (GGRs)
Blair McDougall MP		Parliamentary Under-Secretary of State for Reindustrialisation	industrial energy affordability (joint with the Minister for Energy Consumers); clean energy industry strategy; refineries; industrial decarbonisation and fuel switching; emissions trading; carbon leakage;mineworkers pensions. Held jointly with the Department for Business, Innovation, Science and Trade
Polly Billington MP		Parliamentary Under-Secretary of State for Energy Consumers	consumer energy affordability (domestic and business consumers); departmental oversight of bills and levies; retail energy markets; fuel poverty; consumer protection and standards; energy debt; Ofgem relationship and Ofgem Review; Warm Home Discount and energy bills support schemes; heating oil (supply and regulation); Fuel Finder; departmental lead for disability and child poverty
Margaret Curran, Baroness Curran		Parliamentary Under-Secretary of State	all departmental business in the House of Lords; individual planning decisions

== See also ==
- Department for Business, Energy, and Industrial Strategy – preceding body from 2016 to 2023.
- Department of Energy and Climate Change – similar body from 2008 to 2016.
- Department of Energy – historic body with similar responsibilities from 1974 to 1992.
