= Department of Prices and Consumer Protection =

British government department (1974–1979)

The Department of Prices and Consumer Protection was a short-lived United Kingdom government department created by the incoming Labour government in 1974 when the functions of the Department of Trade and Industry were divided between three new departments (the Department of Trade, the Department of Industry and the Department of Prices and Consumer Protection). In 1979 the department was abolished by the new Conservative government and its responsibilities were re-integrated into the Department of Trade.

== Secretaries of State for Prices and Consumer Protection ==
Colour key (for political parties):
Labour

Secretary of State	Term of Office		Political party	Prime Minister
Shirley Williams	5 March 1974	10 September 1976	Labour	Harold Wilson
Shirley Williams	5 March 1974	10 September 1976	Labour	James Callaghan
Roy Hattersley	10 September 1976	4 May 1979	Labour	James Callaghan
