= Parliamentary private secretary =

UK government office

A parliamentary private secretary (PPS) is a member of Parliament (MP) in the United Kingdom who acts as an unpaid assistant to a government minister or a shadow minister. They are selected from backbench MPs as the "eyes and ears" of the minister in the House of Commons.

PPSs are junior to parliamentary under-secretaries of state, a ministerial post salaried by one or more departments.

== Duties and powers ==
Although not paid other than their salary as an MP, PPSs help the government track backbench opinion in Parliament. They are subject to some restrictions, as outlined in the Ministerial Code of the British government, but are not members of the Government.

A PPS can sit on select committees but must avoid "associating themselves with recommendations critical of, or embarrassing to the Government", and must not make statements or ask questions on matters affecting the minister's department. In particular, the PPS in the Department for Communities and Local Government may not participate in planning decisions or in the consideration of planning cases.

PPSs are not members of the government, and all efforts are made to avoid these positions being referred to as such. They are instead considered more simply as normal Members. However, their close confidence with ministers does impose obligations on every PPS. The guidelines surrounding the divulging of classified information by ministers to PPSs are rigid.

Ministers choose their own PPSs, but they are expected to consult the Chief Whip and must seek the written approval for each candidate from the prime minister.

Although not on the government payroll, PPSs are expected to act as part of the payroll vote, voting in line with the government on every division.

When on official Departmental business, a PPS receives travel and subsistence allowance paid out of government funds, as with formal members of the government. This makes the PPS the only type of unpaid advisor who receives reimbursement in the course of duty.

Overseas travel for PPSs must be approved by the Prime Minister and is granted only in exceptional cases.

== The role in the career of MPs ==
The role of PPS is seen as a starting point for many MPs who aspire to become ministers themselves. According to Philip W. Buck, a professor of political science at Stanford University:

Nine-tenths of the M.P.s who first won seats in the House of Commons in 1918 or thereafter, and who held some ministerial office in the years from 1918 to 1955, began their progress towards posts in a ministry or a Cabinet by serving as parliamentary secretaries or as junior ministers... Recruitment to the front bench clearly begins with these two offices.

After the leaking of party details in emails associated with Desmond Swayne, PPS to David Cameron, a writer of the Thirsk and Malton Labour Party Constituency Blog commented:

A Parliamentary Private Secretary (PPS) is a thankless job. Despite having risen to the rank of MP, those with Governmental ambitions will need to pay their dues once more – as a bag carrier. Admittedly, PPS is a bit more than that – you are supposed to be the eyes and ears, reporting back to your boss all the gossip, what people are saying about your work in the bars and cafes of Westminster.

== Current Parliamentary Private Secretaries ==
As of 19 November 2025, an updated list of Parliamentary Private Secretaries was published on GOV.UK. The Leader of the Opposition usually has at least one Parliamentary Private Secretary as well. More recent changes occurred between March 2026 and May 2026, with some PPSs being promoted to ministerial roles and others resigning following the 2026 United Kingdom local elections.

Parliamentary Private Secretaries
| Department | Office | Minister | PPS | Start |
|---|---|---|---|---|
| Office for the Prime Minister and Cabinet | Prime Minister; First Lord of the Treasury; Minister for the Union; Minister for the Civil Service | Andy Burnham | Sir Nic Dakin | 27 July 2026 |
| Office for the Prime Minister and Cabinet | Prime Minister; First Lord of the Treasury; Minister for the Union; Minister for the Civil Service | Andy Burnham | David Baines | 27 July 2026 |
| Office for the Prime Minister and Cabinet | Prime Minister; First Lord of the Treasury; Minister for the Union; Minister for the Civil Service | Andy Burnham | Jo Platt | 27 July 2026 |
| Cabinet Office | First Secretary of State; Minister for the Cabinet Office; Chancellor of the Duchy of Lancaster | Louise Haigh | Alan Gemmell | 27 July 2026 |
| Cabinet Office | First Secretary of State; Minister for the Cabinet Office; Chancellor of the Duchy of Lancaster | Louise Haigh | Beccy Cooper | 27 July 2026 |
| Cabinet Office | First Secretary of State; Minister for the Cabinet Office; Chancellor of the Duchy of Lancaster | Louise Haigh | Natasha Irons | 27 July 2026 |
| Cabinet Office | Minister for Artificial Intelligence (jointly housed with the Department for Business, Innovation, Science and Trade) | Kanishka Narayan | Lauren Sullivan | 27 July 2026 |
| Cabinet Office | Minister for Intergovernmental Relations and European Relations (jointly housed with the Foreign, Commonwealth and Development Office) | Hamish Falconer | Oliver Ryan | 27 July 2026 |
| HM Treasury | Chancellor of the Exchequer; Second Lord of the Treasury | John Healey | John Grady | 27 July 2026 |
| HM Treasury | Chancellor of the Exchequer; Second Lord of the Treasury | John Healey | Alistair Strathern | 19 July 2024 |
| HM Treasury | Chancellor of the Exchequer; Second Lord of the Treasury | John Healey | Yuan Yang | 27 July 2026 |
| Foreign, Commonwealth and Development Office | Secretary of State for Foreign, Commonwealth and Development Affairs | Ed Miliband | Anna Gelderd | 27 July 2026 |
| Foreign, Commonwealth and Development Office | Secretary of State for Foreign, Commonwealth and Development Affairs | Ed Miliband | Laura Kyrke-Smith | 27 July 2026 |
| Foreign, Commonwealth and Development Office | Secretary of State for Foreign, Commonwealth and Development Affairs | Ed Miliband | Chris Murray | 27 July 2026 |
| Home Office | Secretary of State for the Home Department | Shabana Mahmood | Michael Payne | 11 May 2026 |
| Home Office | Secretary of State for the Home Department | Shabana Mahmood | Adam Thompson | 27 July 2026 |
| Home Office | Secretary of State for the Home Department | Shabana Mahmood | Chris Vince | 27 July 2026 |
| Ministry of Defence | Secretary of State for Defence | Wes Streeting | Gordon McKee | 27 July 2026 |
| Ministry of Defence | Secretary of State for Defence | Wes Streeting | Steve Race | 27 July 2026 |
| Ministry of Defence | Secretary of State for Defence | Wes Streeting | Rosie Wrighting | 27 July 2026 |
| Ministry of Justice | Secretary of State for Justice; Lord Chancellor | Alex Norris | Linsey Farnsworth | 11 May 2026 |
| Ministry of Justice | Secretary of State for Justice; Lord Chancellor | Alex Norris | Joe Powell | 11 September 2025 |
| Ministry of Justice | Secretary of State for Justice; Lord Chancellor | Alex Norris | Connor Rand | 27 July 2026 |
| Department for Health and Social Care | Secretary of State for Health and Social Care | Yvette Cooper | Catherine Atkinson | 27 July 2026 |
| Department for Health and Social Care | Secretary of State for Health and Social Care | Yvette Cooper | David Burton-Sampson | 11 May 2026 |
| Department for Health and Social Care | Secretary of State for Health and Social Care | Yvette Cooper | Sonia Kumar | 27 July 2026 |
| Department for Education | Secretary of State for Education | Lucy Powell | Elsie Blundell | 27 July 2026 |
| Department for Education | Secretary of State for Education | Lucy Powell | Adam Jogee | 27 July 2026 |
| Department for Education | Secretary of State for Education | Lucy Powell | Sarah Smith | 27 July 2026 |
| Ministry of Housing, Communities and Local Government | Secretary of State for Housing, Communities and Local Government | Angela Rayner | Olivia Blake | 27 July 2026 |
| Ministry of Housing, Communities and Local Government | Secretary of State for Housing, Communities and Local Government | Angela Rayner | Luke Charters | 27 July 2026 |
| Ministry of Housing, Communities and Local Government | Secretary of State for Housing, Communities and Local Government | Angela Rayner | Kirith Entwistle | 27 July 2026 |
| Ministry of Housing, Communities and Local Government | Minister of State for Housing and Planning | Matthew Pennycook | Mary Kelly Foy | 27 July 2026 |
| Office for Equality and Opportunity | Minister for Women and Equalities | Bridget Phillipson | Callum Anderson | 27 July 2026 |
| Office for Equality and Opportunity | Minister for Women and Equalities | Bridget Phillipson | Alice Macdonald | 27 July 2026 |
| Department for Energy Security and Net Zero | Secretary of State for Energy Security and Net Zero | Miatta Fahnbulleh | Tom Hayes | 27 July 2026 |
| Department for Energy Security and Net Zero | Secretary of State for Energy Security and Net Zero | Miatta Fahnbulleh | Jeevun Sandher | 27 July 2026 |
| Department for Energy Security and Net Zero | Secretary of State for Energy Security and Net Zero | Miatta Fahnbulleh | Steve Witherden | 27 July 2026 |
| Department for Work and Pensions | Secretary of State for Work and Pensions | Pat McFadden | David Pinto-Duschinsky | 19 November 2025 |
| Department for Work and Pensions | Secretary of State for Work and Pensions | Pat McFadden | Elaine Stewart | 20 May 2026 |
| Department for Work and Pensions | Secretary of State for Work and Pensions | Pat McFadden | Tim Roca | 11 May 2026 |
| Department for Business, Innovation, Science and Trade | Secretary of State for Business, Innovation, Science and Trade; President of the Board of Trade | Jonathan Reynolds | Deirdre Costigan | 27 July 2026 |
| Department for Business, Innovation, Science and Trade | Secretary of State for Business, Innovation, Science and Trade; President of the Board of Trade | Jonathan Reynolds | Baggy Shanker | 27 July 2026 |
| Department for Business, Innovation, Science and Trade | Secretary of State for Business, Innovation, Science and Trade; President of the Board of Trade | Jonathan Reynolds | Marie Tidball | 11 September 2025 |
| Department for Environment, Food and Rural Affairs | Secretary of State for Environment, Food and Rural Affairs | Dame Angela Eagle | Jayne Kirkham | 11 May 2026 |
| Department for Environment, Food and Rural Affairs | Secretary of State for Environment, Food and Rural Affairs | Dame Angela Eagle | Lee Pitcher | 27 July 2026 |
| Department for Transport | Secretary of State for Transport | Heidi Alexander | Amanda Martin | 27 July 2026 |
| Department for Transport | Secretary of State for Transport | Heidi Alexander | Luke Murphy | 27 July 2026 |
| Department for Transport | Secretary of State for Transport | Heidi Alexander | Connor Naismith | 27 July 2026 |
| Northern Ireland Office | Secretary of State for Northern Ireland | Sir Chris Bryant | Pam Cox | 27 July 2026 |
| Northern Ireland Office | Secretary of State for Northern Ireland | Sir Chris Bryant | Pamela Nash | 27 July 2026 |
| Scotland Office | Secretary of State for Scotland | Douglas Alexander | Frank McNally | 11 September 2025 |
| Scotland Office | Secretary of State for Scotland | Douglas Alexander | Alison Taylor | 11 September 2025 |
| Wales Office | Secretary of State for Wales | Stephen Kinnock | Becky Gittins | 19 July 2024 |
| Department for Digital, Culture, Media and Sport | Secretary of State for Digital, Culture, Media and Sport | Lisa Nandy | Jack Abbott | 11 September 2025 |
| Department for Digital, Culture, Media and Sport | Secretary of State for Digital, Culture, Media and Sport | Lisa Nandy | Lola McEvoy | 11 September 2025 |
| Department for Digital, Culture, Media and Sport | Secretary of State for Digital, Culture, Media and Sport | Lisa Nandy | Matthew Patrick | 27 July 2026 |
| Office of the Leader of the House of Lords | Leader of the House of Lords; Lord Privy Seal | The Baroness Smith of Basildon | Matt Rodda | 27 July 2026 |
| Office of the Leader of the House of Commons | Leader of the House of Commons; Lord President of the Council | Sir Alan Campbell | Amanda Hack | 27 July 2026 |
| Attorney General's Office | Attorney General for England and Wales; Advocate General for Northern Ireland | Ellie Reeves | Kevin Bonavia | 5 December 2024 |
| Attorney General's Office | Attorney General for England and Wales; Advocate General for Northern Ireland | Ellie Reeves | Alex McIntyre | 27 July 2026 |

== Notable Parliamentary Private Secretaries to the Prime Minister ==
While giving the holder a close-up view of the workings of government at the highest levels, relatively few Parliamentary Private Secretaries to the Prime Minister seem to have gone on to serve at the highest level of government themselves, although Sir Alec Douglas-Home served as prime minister in 1963–4, while Anthony Barber was Chancellor of the Exchequer from 1970 to 1974, Robert Carr, Home Secretary, 1972–4, and Christopher Soames, Peter Shore, and Gavin Williamson, the future Secretary of State for Education, all went on to be senior Cabinet ministers.

- J. C. C. Davidson to Bonar Law
- Lord Dunglass: to Neville Chamberlain, 1937–1940
- Brendan Bracken to Winston Churchill, 1940–1941
- Christopher Soames to Winston Churchill, 1952–1955
- Robert Carr to Sir Anthony Eden, 1955
- Anthony Barber to Harold Macmillan, 1957–1959
- Peter Shore to Harold Wilson, 1965–1966
- Timothy Kitson to Edward Heath, 1970–1974
- Ian Gow to Margaret Thatcher, 1979–1983
- Peter Morrison to Margaret Thatcher, 1990
- Graham Bright to John Major, 1990–1994
- Gavin Williamson to David Cameron, 2013–2016
- George Hollingbery to Theresa May, 2016–2017

== See also ==
- Parliamentary secretary
- Parliamentary under-secretary of state
- Permanent secretary
- Private secretary
- Principal Private Secretary
