= Simon Walker (businessman) =

British businessperson

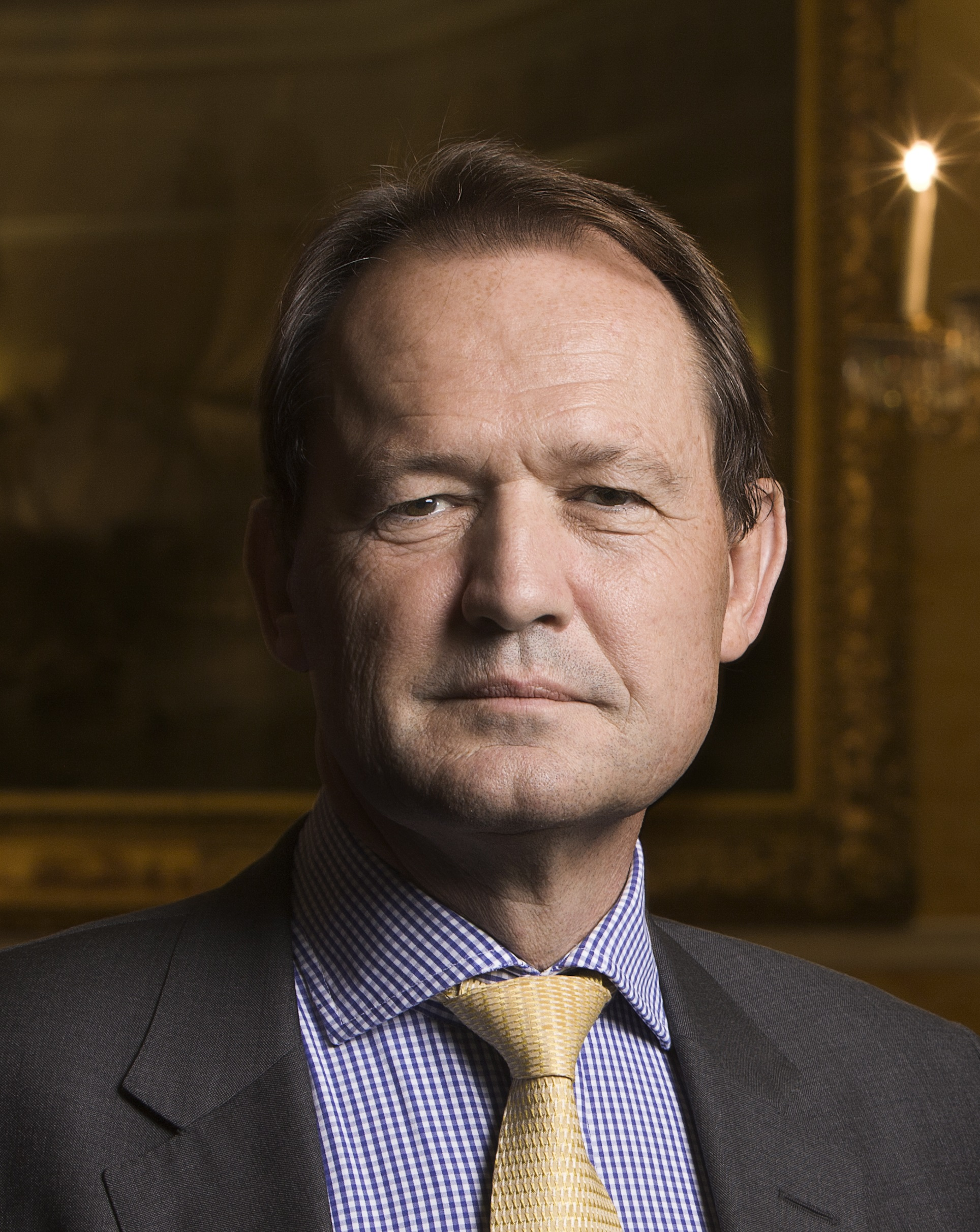
- Simon Walker, as Director General of the IoD

Simon Edward John Walker CBE (born 28 May 1953) is Chairman of the Trade Remedies Authority, and business adviser and consultant to a number of companies. He was previously lead non-executive director of the Department for International Trade and Director General of the Institute of Directors from 2011 to 2016. Prior to this he has been Communications Secretary to Queen Elizabeth II and an advisor to former Prime Minister, John Major. He was born and grew up in South Africa and has worked in media, politics and business in New Zealand, Belgium and the UK.

== Early life and education ==
Walker was born in 1953 in the city of Johannesburg in South Africa. In 1961 he moved to the UK and attended Highgate Junior School, moving back to South Africa in 1964 to live in Cape Town and attend South African College High School there, followed by a return to the UK to study at Balliol College, Oxford, where he gained a degree in Philosophy, Politics and Economics, and was elected President of the Oxford Union in 1974.

== Career ==
After graduating from Oxford in 1974, Walker become a TV journalist with TV One in New Zealand where he stayed for five years. During this time he presented current affairs programme Tonight, on which he interviewed Prime Minister Rob Muldoon, about his assertions regarding the Soviet naval presence in the Pacific, and New Zealand vulnerability to Russian nuclear attack. Muldoon, who had sought to give answers to questions which had already been submitted to him, resented Walker's line of questioning and snapped "I will not have some smart alec interviewer changing the rules half way through." In 1979, he moved to the United States, where he was appointed a Knight Journalism Fellow at Stanford University, California.

He switched to politics, returning to New Zealand as Director of Communications for the Labour Party. His time with the party saw it return to office under David Lange, who defeated three-term incumbent Rob Muldoon's National Party in the 1984 election.

Walker moved to Europe in the late 1980s, working for public relations firm, Hill & Knowlton in London and Brussels, and becoming a partner in Brunswick Group in 1994. He returned to politics in 1996, working in the 10 Downing Street policy unit under Conservative Prime Minister John Major.

Between 2000 and 2002, Walker was Communications Secretary to Queen Elizabeth II, before returning to the private sector as a director at Reuters and Chief executive of the British Private Equity and Venture Capital Association.

== Institute of Directors ==
From 2011 until late 2016 Walker was the Director General of the Institute of Directors, and its primary spokesperson on issues including tax, Europe, regulation, trade and corporate governance and directs the IoD's policy work and training courses for senior business leaders.

The Evening Standard called on the coalition government "to listen to the IoD" over his plans to introduce 'sunset clauses' for business regulations. In January 2015, Allister Heath of The Daily Telegraph wrote "the Institute of Directors, under the superb leadership of Simon Walker continues to think the unthinkable".

At the IoD, he spearheaded a campaign to raise awareness of corporate governance issues and promote best practice within the UK. He also reversed their stance on not publicly commenting on individual companies, and spoke out at poor corporate behaviour at a number of large UK companies, including Barclays, BG Group , Sports Direct and Burberry.

In November 2014 he led a campaign against an attempt by BG Group to pay incoming CEO Helge Lund a £25m golden hello, describing the plan as "excessive and inflammatory". After a week of negative headlines, and increasing shareholder pressure, BG Group and Helge Lund eventually backed down.

In 2013 Walker overhauled the dress code at the IoD's 116 Pall Mall London headquarters, telling Wired magazine it was part of an attempt to rebrand the IoD as home for entrepreneurs and tech start-ups.

Walker was appointed Commander of the Order of the British Empire (CBE) in the 2017 New Year Honours for services to business and the economy.

Walker was succeeded by Stephen Martin whose appointment commenced on 1 February 2017.

After leaving the Institute, Walker was appointed Lead non-executive director at the Department for International Trade (DIT). He served on the board of DIT from 2016 until February 2020, when he was appointed Chairman of the Trade Remedies Authority. Walker remains a business adviser and consultant to a number of companies.

== Politics ==
During his early life and career, Walker affiliated himself with left of centre politics and political parties.

While in South Africa, Walker joined the liberal anti-apartheid Progressive Party as a teenager and campaigned against racial segregation in the country. He has spoken of being raised in a "left-wing household", where his grandfather kept a picture of Soviet leader Joseph Stalin, on their mantelpiece.

At Oxford, he became chairman of the student Labour Party and later worked for the New Zealand Labour Party. Now a committed free-marketer, Walker said that he "lost all faith in the ability of the state to direct the economy", while living in New Zealand during the 1970s and 1980s. He then went on to work for Conservative Prime Minister John Major during the last year of his premiership, and became Director General of the Institute of Directors, described as the business group for "real red-in-tooth and claw capitalists", by James Kirkup, executive editor of The Daily Telegraph.

Walker was named as the 43rd most connected man in Britain by GQ Magazine, in February 2015.
