= Valeur =

Valeur is a surname. Notable people with the surname include:

- Charlotte Valeur, Danish merchant banker
- Henrik Valeur (born 1966), Danish architect
- Martha Seim Valeur (born 1923), Norwegian politician
- Peter Valeur (1847–1922), Norwegian politician

== See also ==
- HMS Valeur
