= Caroline Waters =

British administrator

- Born: Caroline
- Citizenship: United Kingdom
- Employer(s): Equality and Human Rights Commission BT

Caroline Waters OBE is a British member of the advisory board of the Centre for Care, which receives funding from the Economic and Social Research Council (ESRC). She was deputy chair of the UK's Equality and Human Rights Commission from January 2013 to December 2022. She is also Vice President of Carers UK, and was Director of People and Policy at BT. She was on the Sustainable Care advisory board which advised the ESRC's Sustainable Care Large Grant programme, until the programme's end in 2021.

In 2010 she was awarded an OBE for her work on progressive human resources practice, diversity and equal opportunities.
