= French ship Valeureuse =

French ship Valeureuse may refer to:

- French frigate Valeureuse
- French ironclad Valeureuse

== See also ==
- HMS Valeur
