= List of ship launches in 1754 =

The list of ship launches in 1754 includes a chronological list of some ships launched in 1754.

Date	Ship	Class	Builder	Location	Country	Notes
January	Poderoso	Serio-class ship of the line	David Howell	Guarnizo	Spain	For Spanish Navy.
6 March	Défenseur	Défenseur-class ship of the line	Pierre Salnot	Brest	Kingdom of France	For French Navy.
March	Aquilon	Modified Eolo-class ship of the line	Guillermo Turner	Cádiz	Spain	For Spanish Navy.
March	Arrogate	Serio-class ship of the line	David Howell	Guarnizo	Spain	For Spanish Navy.
March	Soberbio	Serio-class ship of the line	David Howell	Guarnizo	Spain	For Spanish Navy.
9 May	Gibraltar	Gibraltar-class ship of the line	Sir Thomas Slade	Portsmouth Dockyard	Great Britain	For Royal Navy.
24 May	Wolf	Cruizer-class sloop	Adam Hayes	Chatham Dockyard	Great Britain	For Royal Navy.
6 July	Neptuno	Modified Eolo-class ship of the line	Reales Astilleros de Esteiro	Ferrol	Spain	For Spanish Navy.
15 July	Tridente	Fourth rate	Edward Bryant	Cartagena	Spain	For Spanish Navy.
22 July	Duc d'Aquitaine	East Indiaman	Nicholas Levesque	Lorient	Kingdom of France	For Compagnie des Indes.
22 July	Dunkirk	Dunkirk-class ship of the line	Edward Allin	Woolwich Dockyard	Great Britain	For Royal Navy.
22 July	Happy	Sloop of war	Edward Allin	Deptford Dockyard	Great Britain	For Royal Navy.
3 September	Amelia	Man-of-war		Naples	Kingdom of Naples	For Royal Neapolitan Navy.
3 September	Seaford	Seaford-class ship of the line	Sir Thomas Slade	Deptford Dockyard	Great Britain	For Royal Navy.
5 September	Aquiles	Africa-class ship of the line	Arsenal de la Carraca	Cádiz	Spain	For Spanish Navy.
23 September	St. Nicholas	Man-of-war		Saint Petersburg	Russia	For Imperial Russian Navy.
13 October	Bienfaisant	Third rate	Jean Goffroy	Brest	Kingdom of France	For French Navy.
17 October	Pondichéry	East Indiaman	Gilles Chambry	Lorient	Kingdom of France	For Compagnie des Indes.
18 October	Gallardo	Modified Eolo-class ship of the line	Reales Astilleros de Esteiro	Ferrol	Spain	For Spanish Navy.
29 October	Valeur	Sixth rate	François-Guillaume Clairin-Deslauriers	Rochefort	Kingdom of France	For French Navy.
20 November	Magnánimo	Modified Eolo-class ship of the line	Reales Astilleros de Esteiro	Ferrol	Spain	For Spanish Navy.
Unknown date	Atlante	Ship of the line		Cádiz	Spain	For Spanish Navy.
Unknown date	Bloys van Treslong	Fourth rate	John May	Amsterdam	Dutch Republic	For Dutch Navy.
Unknown date	Brillante	Third rate	Reales Astilleros de Esteiro	Ferrol	Spain	For Spanish Navy.
Unknown date	Eagle	Snow		Bombay	India	For British East India Company.
Unknown date	Etna	Bomb vessel	Gilbert Sheldon	Karlskrona	Sweden	For Royal Swedish Navy.
Unknown date	Earl of Holderness	East Indiaman		London	Great Britain	For British East India Company.
Unknown date	Euphrates	East Indiaman		Bombay	India	For British East India Company.
Unknown date	Glindhorst	Fourth rate	Charles Bentam	Amsterdam	Dutch Republic	For Dutch Navy.
Unknown date	Meermin	Sixth rate	Charles Bentam	Amsterdam	Dutch Republic	For Dutch Navy.
Unknown date	Nüvid-i Fütûh	First rate		Constantinople	Ottoman Empire	For Ottoman Navy.
Unknown date	Sally	Schooner		Marblehead, Massachusetts	Thirteen Colonies	For private owner.
Unknown date	Zeepard	Sixth rate		Amsterdam	Dutch Republic	For Dutch Navy.
