= Clugston Group =

UK company

- Type: Private
- Industry: Construction
- Founded: 1937
- Defunct: December 2019
- Headquarters: Scunthorpe, Lincolnshire, England, United Kingdom
- Key people: John Clugston (chairman); Glynn Thomas (interim CEO)
- Revenue: circa £175 million p.a.
- Number of employees: 629
- Website: www.clugston.co.uk

The Clugston Group was a privately owned business involved in construction and civil engineering, property development and logistics. It was based in Scunthorpe, North Lincolnshire, England. On 5 December 2019, the group and its construction businesses filed for administration, with debts of £64m.

== History ==
The company has its origins in the business endeavours of Leonard Clugston; in 1922, Leonard established JG Clugston Ltd, which operated as a builders’ merchants, timber, transport, and joinery. Two years later, Leonard was approached with an offer to work one of the slag banks (a waste material produced by the blast furnaces of Scunthorpe’s numerous iron and steel plants) with the intention of using the material in local road construction for the town. He quickly recognised that the material had considerable potential that nobody else appeared to be interest in; accordingly, in 1937, he founded a new company, Clugston Cawood, for the purpose of exploiting it.

The company's early activities centered around its pioneering work in the development and use of recycled slag into various building materials. Amongst other roles, this material was used in the construction of runways for the Royal Air Force (RAF) in the Second World War. The company undertook various civil engineering works throughout the conflict, taking on straightforwarding contracting work for the most part, such as the construction of air raid shelters and anti-glare pits as well as the erection of poles in large fields to stop enemy gliders landing as part of the anti-invasion preparations on the east coast.

Throughout the latter half of the twentieth century, Clugston focused on the construction, transportation, and the provision of bulk services to some of Britain’s largest companies. The company continued to work with various steelworks, both domestic ones and those in France and Germany. Numerous steelworks closed over time, necessitating changes at the firm. While the company's management recognised that the construction sector was particularly vulnerable during economic downturns, it was decided to increasingly orientate towards this sector over its other activities.

Clugston Group was involved in the construction of various public facilities, including schools, hospitals, reservoirs, and supermarkets. One frequent area of business was road construction; it would regularly receive contracts from bodies such as the Department of Transport to build bypasses and other schemes of a similar scale. The firm was also involved in the construction of numerous waste-to-energy plants. It also constructed various offices and factories on behalf of various parties. It also built retail outlets and distribution centres. The company also undertook several projects of an unconventional nature.

In June 2009, the then company CEO Stephen Martin went 'undercover' at the company for the television series of Channel 4, Undercover Boss. Martin described the experience as extremely positive, and implemented a number of new measures as a result.

During the late 2000s, business activity dipped, which was attributed to the unfavourable economic consequences of the Great Recession; the company responded with 200 redundancies. By 2013, Clugston Group had apparently reversed its fortunes, having achieved record profits along with a 30 per cent rise in turnover. Further revenue growth occurred during subsequent years.

In February 2017, Martin left to become director general of the Institute of Directors, and was replaced by Bob Vickers (formerly a director of Carillion Construction Services). Vickers resigned as CEO in June 2019; Glynn Thomas became interim CEO.

=== Administration ===
On 5 December 2019, the company filed a notice of intention to appoint administrators from KPMG, for Clugston Group Ltd, Clugston Construction Ltd and Clugston Services Ltd. The group reportedly collapsed owing over £40m (a figure later revised to £64m), and was operating from over twenty five sites primarily across the Midlands and northern England. Some 250 employees were reportedly set to lose their jobs immediately. The group's losses were attributed to a combination of problematic waste-to-energy contracts and an "acute cash flow issue" that had been exacerbated by the June 2019 failure of a key subcontractor which resulted in "significant ransom positions from the supply chain".

400 of Clugston Group's 629 strong workforce were employed in construction, and, on 9 December 150 were reported to have been made redundant. By 7 January 2020, the number of redundancies at the firm had grown to 280; 15 staff working on three facilities management contracts had been transferred to new employers, while 51 staff were assisting the administrators.

The company had grown through participation, via a partnership with France's CNIM, in the construction of numerous waste-to-energy plants; such projects had also caused financial problems for other contractors in the United Kingdom, including Costain and Interserve. CNIM took on sixty seven former employees of Clugston, who had been working on joint venture projects in the United Kingdom.

== Operations ==
The group was organised into five divisions:

- Construction
- Facilities management
- Logistics
- Private Finance
- Property

The administration of December 2019 mainly concerned Clugston's construction related operations. Clugston Distribution Services was sold in January 2020, to Leicester-based AJWG. The Clugston Estates property business continued to trade until 3 February 2020, then also entered administration.
