= Department for Business =

In the United Kingdom, Department for Business generally refers to the Department for Business and Trade, created in 2023.

Department for Business may also refer to:

- Department for Business, Energy and Industrial Strategy (2016–2023), predecessor to the Department for Business and Trade
- Department for Business, Innovation and Skills (2009–2016), predecessor to the Department for Business, Energy and Industrial Strategy
- Business Department, a faculty in one of several education institutions, such as a college or university where students are taught business related topics
