= HMS Valeur =

Two ships of the Royal Navy have borne the name HMS Valeur:

- HMS Valeur (1705) was a 24-gun sixth rate captured from the French in 1705 by HMS Worcester. She was converted to a fire ship in 1716 and was broken up in 1718.
- HMS Valeur (1759) was a 28-gun sixth rate captured from the French in 1759 by HMS Favourite and sold in 1764.
