= Stephen Martin (businessman) =

British businessman (born 1966)

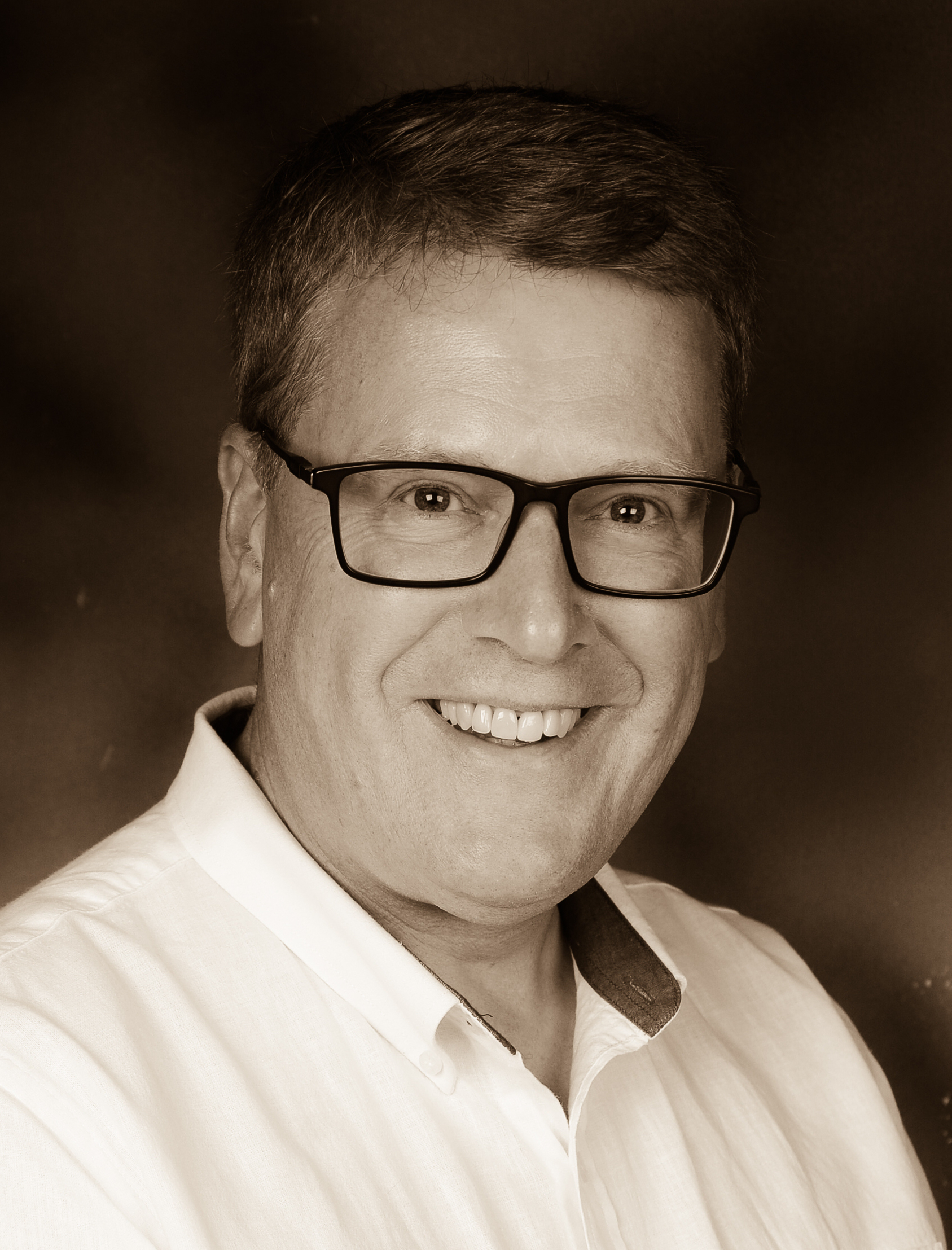
- Born: 1966 (age 59–60)
- Other name: British
- Education: Ulster University; London Business School
- Occupation: Businessman
- Spouse: Lisa Martin
- Children: Annaliese; George
- Parent(s): Fred Martin; Aileen Martin

Stephen Martin (born 1966) is a British businessman. He served as the chief executive officer of the Clugston Group construction and civil engineering company from 2006 to 2016. He was the director general of the Institute of Directors from February 2017 to early 2019.

== Early life and education ==
Martin was born in Belfast, Northern Ireland, in 1966. Martin moved to Blackpool at the age of 10, and his father died three years later.

Martin graduated from Ulster University, where he earned a Bachelor of Science in quantity surveying in 1988. Upon graduation he joined the British Army. He earned a master in business administration from London Business School in 2003.

== Career ==
Martin began his career as a quantity surveyor. After holding positions with Westinghouse, Kværner, Amey Rail Ltd. and Barhale Ltd., he served as the chief executive officer of the Clugston Group, a construction firm, from 2006 to 2016. In 2009, he appeared on Undercover Boss, a British reality television series in which company heads disguised as new employees experience what it is like to work at various positions within the company. During his tenure leading Clugston Group, the company went from averaging an annual loss of £263,000 to averaging an annual profit of £2.6 million.

Martin voted for Brexit in the 2016 referendum. He has argued that Brexit could lead to more trade with African markets.

In 2016, it was announced that Martin would succeed Simon Walker as the Director General of the Institute of Directors, and his term began in February 2017. In that position, Martin worked to give the IoD "a leading voice in ... supporting government to negotiate a Brexit deal which is in the interest of business". Martin was the IoD's primary spokesperson on issues including tax, Europe, regulation and trade, and directed the IoD's policy work and training courses for senior business leaders. He led IoD campaigns on mental health awareness for business leaders and supporting the LGBT+ business community, and sat on the Prime Minister's Brexit advisory group, and on the Prime Minister's Business Council for the Telecoms and Media Industries. In 2017, he led initiatives relating to corporate governance, supporting reforms to the UK listing code such as those initiated by Prime Minister Theresa May to require certain companies to disclose the ratio between chief executive pay and that of average workers, and to maintain a register of companies with significant shareholder opposition to executive wages. He also used his office to encourage business leaders to work with schools to become mentors. In 2018, he criticised a change in listing rules by the Financial Conduct Authority designed to allow Saudi Aramco to skirt certain corporate governance requirements.

In 2018 The Guardian reported that IoD Chair Barbara Judge had commented negatively on the fact that three employees were black or pregnant. These comments were "understood to have been recorded" by Martin, after which the Judge, who was at the time already facing various allegations of improper conduct, resigned. Martin remained with the Institute of Directors until 2019, and thereafter left to become a consultant.

== Personal life ==
Martin has a wife, Lisa, and two children.
