= Trade Remedies Authority =

Agency overview
- Formed: 1 June 2021
- Jurisdiction: Government of the United Kingdom
- Agency executive: Nick Baird, Chairman
- Parent department: Department for Business and Trade
- Website: https://www.gov.uk/government/organisations/trade-remedies-authority

The Trade Remedies Authority (TRA) is a non-departmental public body of the Department for Business and Trade in the Government of the United Kingdom. The organisation was established on 1 June 2021 after the passing of the Trade Act 2021. Formerly part of the Department for International Trade, the trade watchdog was set up post Brexit to police trade disputes.

The ability of the TRA to bind the government was cut back two years after launch, because new ministers were less committed to the value of a technocratic body shielding ministers from producer lobbying. The Institute for Government drew the lesson that without ministerial sign-off, or even approval of a business case, a public body is vulnerable to a change in priorities, as it does not achieve full-throated support across government, much less the wider stakeholder population.
