= Nick Baird =

Chair of Trade Remedies Authority and Carers UK

Nicholas Graham Faraday Baird CMG CVO (born 15 May 1962), known as Nick Baird, is Chair of the Trade Remedies Authority, of the Portman Group and of the charity, Carers UK. He is a former UK Ambassador to Turkey and was group corporate affairs director of energy firm Centrica.

== Early life and education ==
He was born, on 15 May 1962, to Colin and Elizabeth Baird and studied at Emmanuel College, Cambridge, graduating with an MA in English Literature.

== Career ==
=== Foreign and Commonwealth Office ===
Baird joined the Foreign and Commonwealth Office in 1983. His first foreign posting was to Kuwait in 1986; he then went, in 1989, to Brussels as First Secretary in the UK Representation to the EU, later serving as Counsellor (Justice and Home Affairs) there from 1998 to 2002. From 1993 to 1997 he was Private Secretary to the Parliamentary Under-Secretary of State, and then became head of the unit covering the EU Intergovernmental conference. His next foreign posting, in 1997, was to Muscat as Deputy Head of Mission.

In 2002 he was appointed Head of the European Union Department, before being seconded the following year to direct immigration policy within the Home Office. Subsequently, he was Ambassador to Turkey and Director-General Europe & Globalisation.

=== Other roles ===
Baird was group corporate affairs director of energy firm Centrica from 2014 to 2022 and chief executive officer of UK Trade & Investment from 2011 to 2013. He has also been a Trustee of Royal Botanical Gardens, Kew, Chair of Council at Cheltenham Ladies' College and an Independent Director of Nord Anglia Education.

== Honours ==
He was appointed a Companion of the Order of St Michael and St George in the 2010 Birthday Honours.

== Personal life ==
Baird is married to Caroline (née Ivett), with whom he has a son and two daughters.
