= Kanishka Narayan =

British politician (born 1989)

The Right Honourable Kanishka Narayan MP
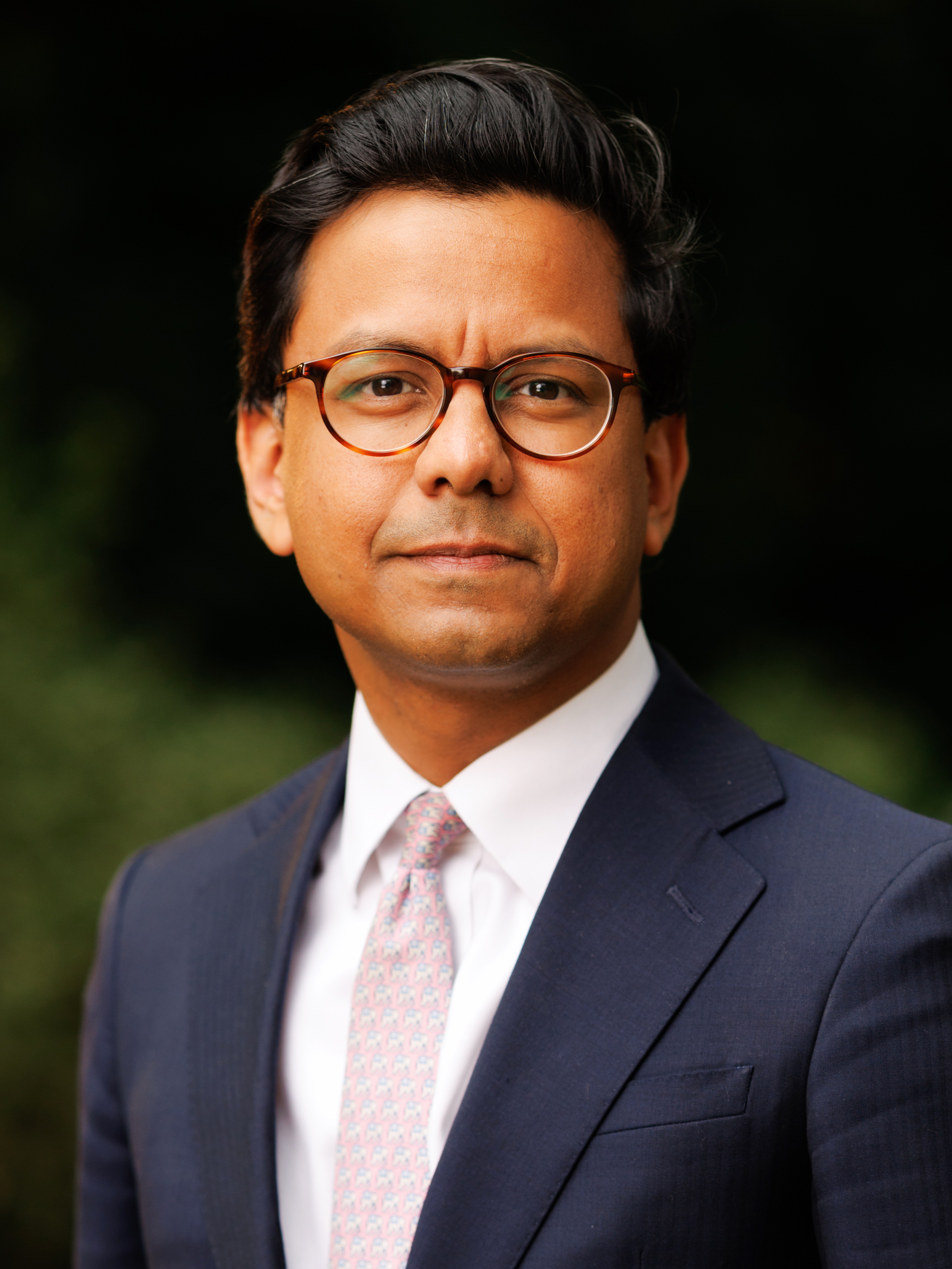
- Official portrait, 2026

Minister for Artificial Intelligence
- Incumbent
- Assumed office 20 July 2026
- Prime Minister: Andy Burnham
- Preceded by: Office established

Parliamentary Under-Secretary of State for AI and Online Safety
- In office 7 September 2025 – 20 July 2026
- Prime Minister: Keir Starmer
- Preceded by: Feryal Clark
- Succeeded by: Himself as Minister of State

Member of Parliament for Vale of Glamorgan
- Incumbent
- Assumed office 4 July 2024
- Preceded by: Alun Cairns
- Majority: 4,216 (9.2%)

Personal details
- Born: November 1989 (age 36) Muzaffarpur, Bihar, India
- Party: Labour
- Education: Balliol College, Oxford (BA); Stanford University (MBA)
- Website: kanishkanarayan.com

Kanishka Narayan (born November 1989) is a British politician who has served as Minister for Artificial Intelligence since July 2026. He previously served as Parliamentary Under-Secretary of State for AI and Online Safety from 2025 to 2026. A member of the Labour Party, he has been the Member of Parliament (MP) for the Vale of Glamorgan since 2024.

== Early life and education ==
Narayan was born in Muzaffarpur, Bihar, India, in November 1989. His family moved to Cardiff when he was 12 years old, and he grew up in the city, sleeping on the floor of his family's one-bedroom home off City Road. He spent one year at Cathays High School before attending Eton College in Berkshire after winning a full scholarship. He studied PPE at Balliol College, Oxford, before gaining a Master of Business Administration degree from Stanford University. He is the only Labour MP elected since 2005 to have attended Eton and the first Labour Cabinet minister to be an Old Etonian since 1968.

He has said that he joined the Labour Party when he was 18.

== Early career ==
Narayan was a civil servant in the Cabinet Office under David Cameron and later worked at the Environment Department under Liz Truss. He also worked as an investment banker at Lazard, advising corporate and technology clients on mergers and acquisitions and capital markets.

He has also volunteered with Citizens Advice and The Trussell Trust.

== Parliamentary career ==
In 2023, Narayan moved from Cardiff to the Waterfront in Barry, in the Vale of Glamorgan, a couple of weeks after being selected as the Labour candidate for the Vale of Glamorgan constituency.

He won the Vale of Glamorgan seat in the July 2024 general election, becoming Wales' first ethnic-minority MP. The BBC described his election as "one of the most significant developments since Lady Megan Lloyd George became the first woman MP from Wales, back in 1929".

After the election, he was appointed parliamentary private secretary to Steve Reed, the Secretary of State for Environment, Food and Rural Affairs. On 7 September 2025, he was appointed Parliamentary Under-Secretary of State for AI and Online Safety, a junior ministerial role in the Department for Science, Innovation and Technology.

On 20 July 2026, Prime Minister Andy Burnham promoted him to become the first UK Minister for Artificial Intelligence, a Cabinet-attending role jointly based in the newly formed Department for Business, Innovation, Science and Trade and the Cabinet Office.

== Honours ==
On 21 July 2026, he was sworn in as a member of the Privy Council, entitling him to use the honorific style "The Right Honourable" for life.

Parliament of the United Kingdom
Preceded by Alun Cairns	Member of Parliament for Vale of Glamorgan; 2024–present	Incumbent
