= Minister of Artificial Intelligence =

British Government cabinet position

United Kingdom Minister for Artificial Intelligence
- Royal Arms of His Majesty's Government

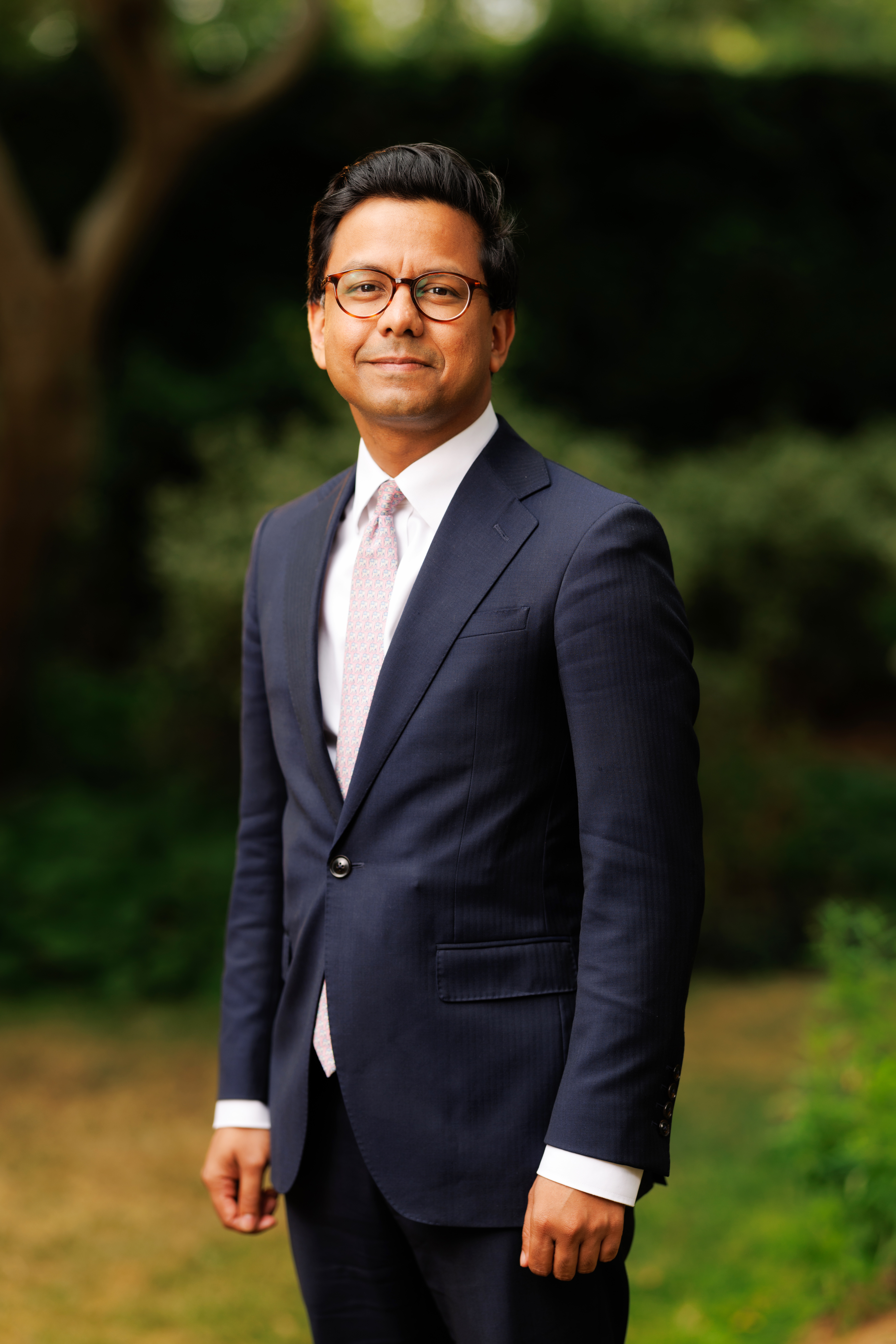
- Incumbent; Kanishka Narayan since 20 July 2026
- Department for Business, Innovation, Science and Trade; Cabinet Office
- Style: Minister
- Nominator: Prime Minister of the United Kingdom
- Appointer: The Monarch; on advice of the Prime Minister
- Term length: At His Majesty's pleasure
- Formation: 20 July 2026
- First holder: Kanishka Narayan
- Website: www.gov.uk/government/ministers/minister-of-state-minister-for-artificial-intelligence

The Minister of Artificial Intelligence, formerly Minister for Artificial Intelligence, is a position in the Department for Business, Innovation, Science and Trade and the Cabinet Office in the British government. The post has been held by Kanishka Narayan since its creation on 20 July 2026.

The position was originally created in March 2023 by Prime Minister Rishi Sunak as Parliamentary Under-Secretary of State for Artificial Intelligence and Intellectual Property and was based in the Department for Science, Innovation and Technology.

The position was renamed to Minister of Artificial Intelligence in July 2026 by Prime Minister Andy Burnham with the right to attend Cabinet.

== List of ministers ==
Name	Portrait	Entered office	Left office	Political party	Ministry
Parliamentary Under-Secretary of State for Artificial Intelligence and Intellectual Property
Jonathan Berry, 5th Viscount Camrose		7 March 2023	5 July 2024	Conservative	Sunak
Parliamentary Under-Secretary of State for AI and Digital Government
Feryal Clark		7 July 2024	7 September 2025	Labour	Starmer
Parliamentary Under-Secretary of State for AI and Online Safety
Kanishka Narayan		7 September 2025	20 July 2026	Labour	Starmer
Minister of State for Artificial Intelligence					
Kanishka Narayan (attends Cabinet)		20 July 2026	Incumbent	Labour	Burnham

== See also ==
- AI Security Institute – research organisation under the Department for Science, Innovation and Technology
