= Trade Act 2021 =

Act of the Parliament of the United Kingdom

Trade Act 2021 (Note: Section 19.)
- Act of Parliament
- Parliament of the United Kingdom
- Long title: An Act to make provision about international trade agreements; to make provision establishing the Trade Remedies Authority and conferring functions on it; to make provision about the Trade and Agriculture Commission; and to make provision about the collection and disclosure of information relating to trade.
- Citation: 2021 c. 10
- Introduced by: Liz Truss (Secretary of State for International Trade) (Commons); Lord Grimstone of Boscobel (Minister of State for Investment) (Lords)
- Territorial extent: United Kingdom (Note: Section 17.)

Dates
- Royal assent: 29 April 2021
- Commencement: 6 May 2021 (in part) (Note: Section 18.)
Other legislation
Amends	Public Records Act 1958; Parliamentary Commissioner Act 1967; Northern Ireland Assembly Disqualification Act 1975; House of Commons Disqualification Act 1975; Freedom of Information Act 2000; Equality Act 2010; Agriculture Act 2020
Amended by	Trade Act 2021 (Commencement No. 1 and Expiry Provision) Regulations 2021; Criminal Justice Act 2003 (Commencement No. 33) and Sentencing Act 2020 (Commencement No. 2) Regulations 2022; Judicial Review and Courts Act 2022 (Magistrates’ Court Sentencing Powers) Regulations 2023; Retained EU Law (Revocation and Reform) Act 2023 (Consequential Amendment) Regulations 2023

Status: Amended

Text of statute as originally enacted

Revised text of statute as amended

The Trade Act 2021 (c. 10) is an act of the Parliament of the United Kingdom to make provision about the implementation of international trade agreements. It was introduced to the House of Commons on 19 March 2020 by the Secretary of State for International Trade Liz Truss, and introduced to the House of Lords on 21 July 2020 by Lord Grimstone of Boscobel. It received royal assent on 29 April 2021.

The law established the Trade Remedies Authority.

== Summary and purpose ==
An earlier "Trade Bill" anticipating UK withdrawal from the European Union was introduced in the UK Parliament 2017-2019 Parliamentary session (7 November 2017), intended make to provision for "the implementation of international trade agreements; to make provision establishing the Trade Remedies Authority and conferring functions on it; and to make provision about the collection and disclosure of information relating to trade". The bill failed to complete its passage through Parliament before the end of the session and therefore failed.

The 2021 Act was promised in the 2019 Conservative party manifesto.

The Act was designed (like the previous bill) "to make provision about the implementation of international trade agreements; to make provision establishing the Trade Remedies Authority and conferring functions on it; and to make provision about the collection and disclosure of information relating to trade."

According to Christopher Hope, the Act was designed to "enshrine in law the framework to allow the UK to sign deals with other countries. It [would] also allow the Government to roll over billions of pounds of existing trade deals that the EU already has with third countries."

== Amendments ==
=== In the Commons ===
==== At third reading ====
The Bill, as yet in bill form, was read for the third time on 20 July 2020. Four amendments were negatived on this day: MP Neil Parish, who chairs the Environment, Food and Rural Affairs Select Committee, was somewhat confused that "ministers would not accept the (Djanogly) amendment as the scrutiny would ensure they follow through on commitments" to animal health and welfare, protection of the environment, and food safety and hygiene.

Division	Proposed by	Proposal	Ayes	Noes	Explanation
78	Jonathan Djanogly	Parliamentary approval of trade agreements	263	326	Parliament to have a "yes/no vote" on the negotiating objectives and the final draft agreement. As things stand there is no longer a parliamentary veto and no formal scrutiny committee relationship yet established.
79	Keir Starmer	Import of agricultural goods after IP completion day	251	337	This new clause would set a requirement for imported agricultural goods to meet animal health and welfare, environmental, plant health, food safety and other standards which are at least as high as those which apply to UK produced agricultural goods.
80	Keir Starmer	International trade agreements: health or care services	251	340	This amendment would aim to protect the NHS and publicly funded health and care services in other parts of the UK from any form of control from outside the UK.
81	Stewart Hosie	Implementation of international trade agreements	244	345	This amendment would ensure that the consent of a devolved government is required for regulations under section 2(1) if those regulations contain matters which are within the remit of the devolved government.

=== In the Lords ===
==== The Purvis amendment ====
On 7 December 2020, Lord Purvis of Tweed proposed Amendment 6 "for greater accountability and transparency of deals... and (for) negotiating objectives (to) be put before Parliament and approved by both Houses before talks on potential trade agreements start." The Purvis amendment was passed 308 "content" to 261 "not content".

==== The McIntosh amendment ====
Also on 7 December 2020, Baroness McIntosh of Pickering proposed Amendment 7, to establish the permanent "Trade and Agriculture Commission" (as distinct from the temporary Agriculture and Trade Commission) which would have established the eponymous body corporate, to maintain "standards equivalent to standards applied within the United Kingdom at the time of import for goods imported under a trade agreement between the United Kingdom and any other state." When she pressed her amendment in the face of opposition from Grimstone, it was "disagreed" with no recorded vote.

==== The Collins amendment ====
On 7 December 2020, Lord Collins of Highbury proposed Amendment 8 for "determination on compliance with international obligations and state actions". The Collins amendment passed with 297 "contents" and 221 "not contents".

==== The Alton amendment ====
In September 2020, the former Conservative Party leader (now) Sir Iain Duncan Smith (IDS), who is "convinced that the Chinese government was 'performing the systematic eradication of the Uighur people'", said that the Inter-Parliamentary Alliance on China had "proposed an amendment to the trade bill which states that if it is deemed that a country is practicing genocide then the trade arrangements with that country should not stand".

In a January 2021 Daily Telegraph op-ed IDS, who was especially outraged at the "organised brutality of the Chinese Communist Party", congratulated the House of Lords on its amendment (proposed by Lord Alton and supported by "a cross-party group of peers that include the former Conservative cabinet minister Michael Forsyth, former Conservative chief whip Lord Blencathra, former Conservative party chairman Eric Pickles and other Conservatives, alongside Labour peers and numerous others, including the former Supreme Court Justice Lord Hope") to the Trade Bill that "would require that the UK does not trade with genocidal regimes. Importantly, with the United Nations having shown itself incapable of making such decisions, the determination of whether genocide has taken place would be made by the High Court of England and Wales."

In a November 2020 article, Juliet Samuel explained that the UK "government does not (currently) make judgments on whether genocides are happening or not. Instead, we outsource that judgment to the UN and declare it's all a legal matter for the International Criminal Court. Of course, referring a case to the ICC requires a UN Security Council resolution, so any state with a veto, like Russia or China, can scotch that. In effect, UK policy amounts to ignoring the issue. This amendment would instead hand jurisdiction to our judges."

==== The Thornton amendment ====
Amendment 11 was proposed on 7 December 2021 by Baroness Thornton regarding "International trade agreements: health, care or publicly funded data processing services and IT systems in connection with the provision of health and care". It passed by 232 "contents" to 143 "not contents".

==== The Kidron amendment ====
According to a Daily Telegraph journalist in a piece concerning Section 230 of the Communications Decency Act, the Government on 12 January 2021 "suffered a defeat in the House of Lords over an amendment to the trade bill, introduced by Baroness Kidron, preventing UK negotiators from signing up to treaty provisions giving protections to US tech giants. The amendment still needs to be passed by the Commons to become binding."

=== Commons: Result of the Lords amendments ===
On 19 January 2021, the speaker reminded the Commons that the bill was a matter of confidence, and then government, which had chosen to oppose all Lords amendments, narrowly averted a loss over the Alton amendment on genocide by the margin 319 to 308. Notable rebels were Duncan Smith, David Davis, Damian Green, Tom Tugendhat, Tobias Ellwood, Caroline Nokes, Tracey Crouch, Jonathan Djanogly and Nus Ghani. In all, 33 Conservative members rebelled. Jeremy Hunt abstained. Trade Minister Greg Hands remarked that it was "unprecedented and unacceptable to give the courts powers to revoke trade deals agreed by elected governments". Duncan Smith proposed an amendment "which would give the Commons the right to debate whether trade deals can be halted if genocide is proven" but was unable to force a vote on it.

The Board of Deputies of British Jews was interested in the matter and said that "we will continue to campaign energetically for justice for the Uyghurs and will be supporting the revised (Duncan Smith) amendment to be tabled in the House of Lords. The Uyghurs will have their day in court." A Jewish News campaign was mounted "urging MPs to back the amendment", with a "special front page editorial printed this week", calling on them to "Stop Uyghur Genocide". Ghani wrote: "Clear message from @HouseofCommons that we will not be bystanders to genocide", while Ellwood complained that "I should not have to rebel against my own Government to support the international moral high ground."

=== Lords amendments ===
On 3 February the legislative ping-pong was well and truly joined and in the House of Lords government suffered defeat on three new amendments:

- Lord Lansley "would give Parliament the opportunity to set negotiating terms for trade deals."
- Lord Collins "would compel ministers to report on human rights before trade deals are considered."
- In Lord Alton's text, "the High Court would be given the right to make a preliminary judgement on genocide and ministers would then be obliged to have a debate in Parliament if such human rights abuses were found to have occurred."

== Commentary ==
Daily Telegraph economics editor Jeremy Warner opined on 19 January 2021 that "Pressure groups cannot dictate our relationship with China", while the editorial board remarked on the same day on the same topic that "It was only five years ago that (Chancellor of the Exchequer) George Osborne proclaimed a golden era of Sino-UK relations, describing this country as Beijing's 'best partner in the West'. Given the crushing of democracy in Hong Kong, China's failure to be transparent about the early days of the COVID-19 pandemic, and its increasingly bellicose posturing against Taiwan, such optimism now looks hopelessly naive."

On the same date which was noted as a Commons vote on the Trade Bill, MP and Chair of the Environment, Food and Rural Affairs Select Committee Neil Parish argued in an op-ed that "Our sovereign Parliament should have a central role" by "empowering British MPs to scrutinise trade agreements" to "bring us into line with other independent trading nations which share our values." Further, "the best trade deals are those which carry democratic support and are developed in partnership with MPs, who are able to represent the concerns of their constituents, including brilliant local businesses." Indeed, Parish remarked that "I am keen to ensure that new trade deals protect British food standards and the interests of British producers and consumers."

An editorial written on 3 February 2021 in the Daily Telegraph said government "risks a bigger Tory backbench rebellion when the amendment comes back to the Commons" and pointed out that immediate targets of this legislation would include not only China but also Israel "which is presumably not what its supporters have in mind."
