= Institute of Directors =

British professional organisation

Coordinates: 51°30′26″N 0°7′54.49″W

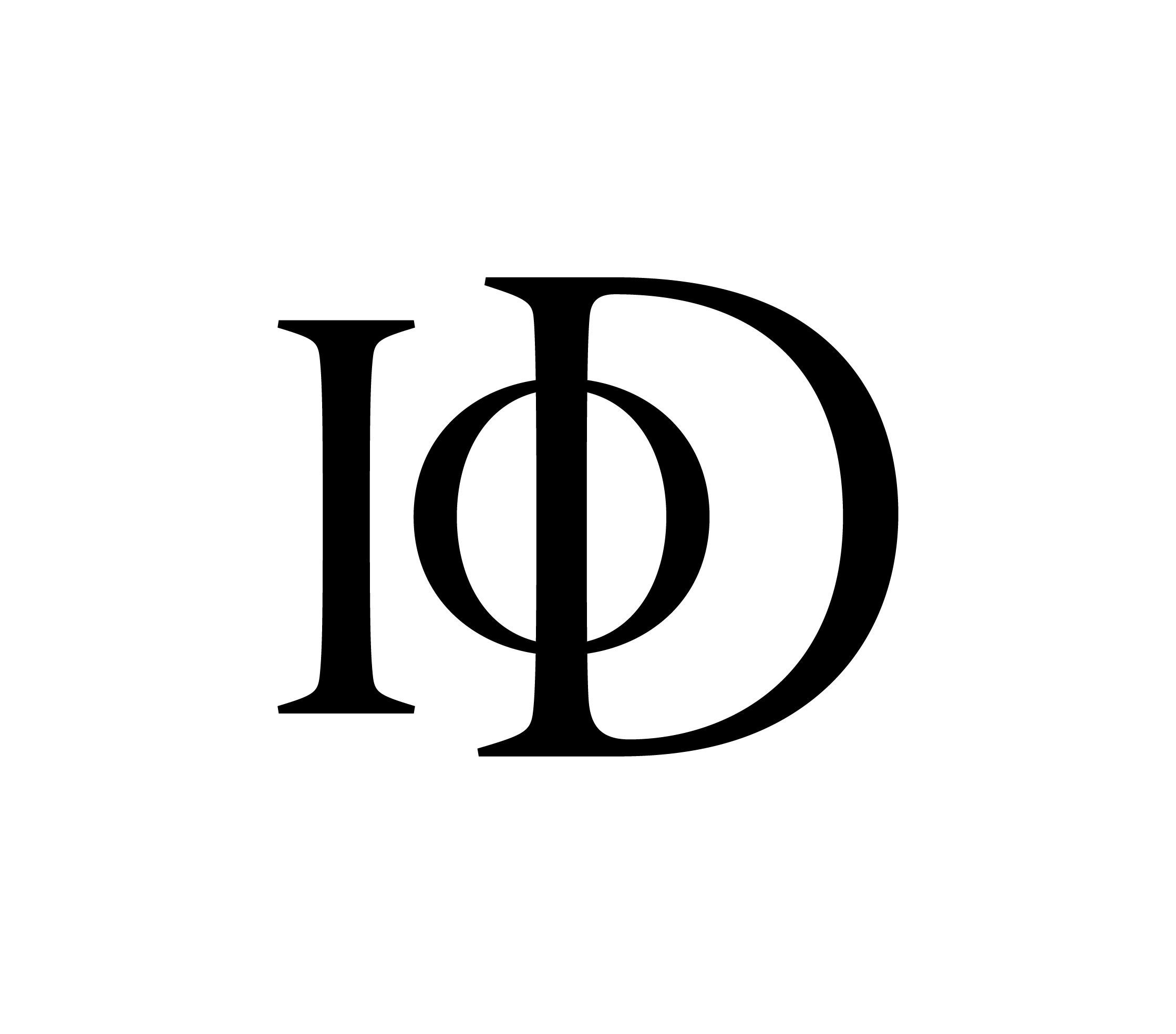

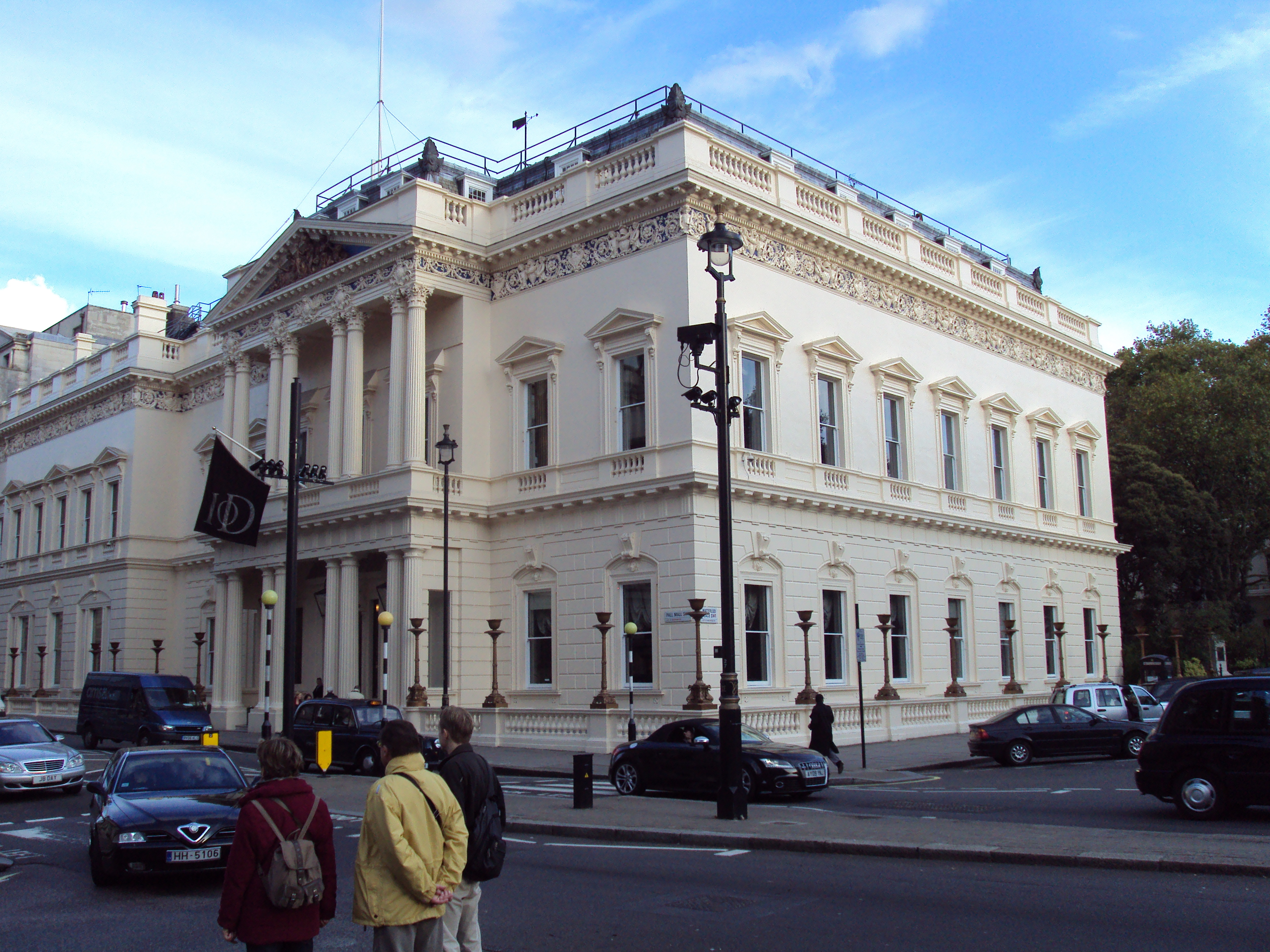
- IoD headquarters at 116 Pall Mall
- Founded: 1903; 123 years ago
- Type: Professional organisation
- Purpose: Business leaders
- Headquarters: 116 Pall Mall; London, SW1; United Kingdom
- Members: 20,000+
- Director General: Jonathan Geldart
- Website: www.iod.com

The Institute of Directors (IoD) is a British professional organisation for company directors, senior business leaders and entrepreneurs. It is the UK's longest running organisation for professional leaders, having been founded in 1903 and incorporated by royal charter in 1906. The charter charged the IoD with promoting free enterprise, lobbying government and setting standards for corporate governance.

The IoD is based in a Grade I listed building at 116 Pall Mall in London, formerly the United Service Club. Members of the IoD also gain access to a network of partner workspaces across the UK, bespoke market intelligence, tailored tax and legal support, and exclusive member-only events along with discounts on IoD professional development courses and events.

Membership peaked at around 55,000 in 2005, In 2021, the IoD had just over 20,000 full members, with membership having stabilised during that period. Members of the IoD come from companies of all sizes and from all industries. Around 70% are self-employed or work for small and medium-sized enterprises, while 78% of FTSE 100 companies have an IoD member on their board or in a senior management position.

== History and royal charter ==
The IoD was founded in 1903 and incorporated by royal charter in 1906. Its mission statement compels the IoD to:

- Promote for the public benefit high levels of skill, knowledge, professional competence and integrity on the part of directors
- Represent the interests of members and the business community to government and in the public arena
- Encourage and foster a climate favourable to entrepreneurial activity and wealth creation
- Promote the study, research and development of corporate governance

== Membership ==
The IoD represents individual members. Every member's voice carries equal weight within the organisation, and members retain their membership of the IoD throughout their career. This allows the IoD to speak on behalf of the business community and discuss individual companies in public.

There are currently over 20,000 IoD members in the UK and overseas. Anybody who has an interest in business, is running a business, is self-employed, sits on a board or runs their own company can join the IoD.

== Policy ==
The IoD represents its members and makes the case for good corporate governance in the public and to government. Working with various stakeholders, the IoD campaigns on issues of importance to its members and the wider business community to build an environment in the UK which supports company directors.

== Activities ==
=== Business support ===
The IoD's Information and Advisory Services offer members tailored and bespoke business advice on all aspects of running a business, including unbiased and confidential legal, financial, HR, marketing, and tax support. Full members of the IoD can access the support through online, telephone or face-to-face consultations, and are allowed up to 25 different consultations each year.

=== Training and development ===
The IoD provides training, with courses to suit business leaders at different stages of their career. There are role-specific training courses to equip directors with new skills to take on different roles along with the flagship Chartered Director course.

Training courses are open to both members and non-members, and around 6,500 people take part in an IoD course every year. The IoD networks also provide executive coaching, mentoring services and online learning zones.

=== Initiatives and events ===
The IoD hosts hundreds of networking, policy and social events throughout the year and across the country.

==== Annual Convention ====
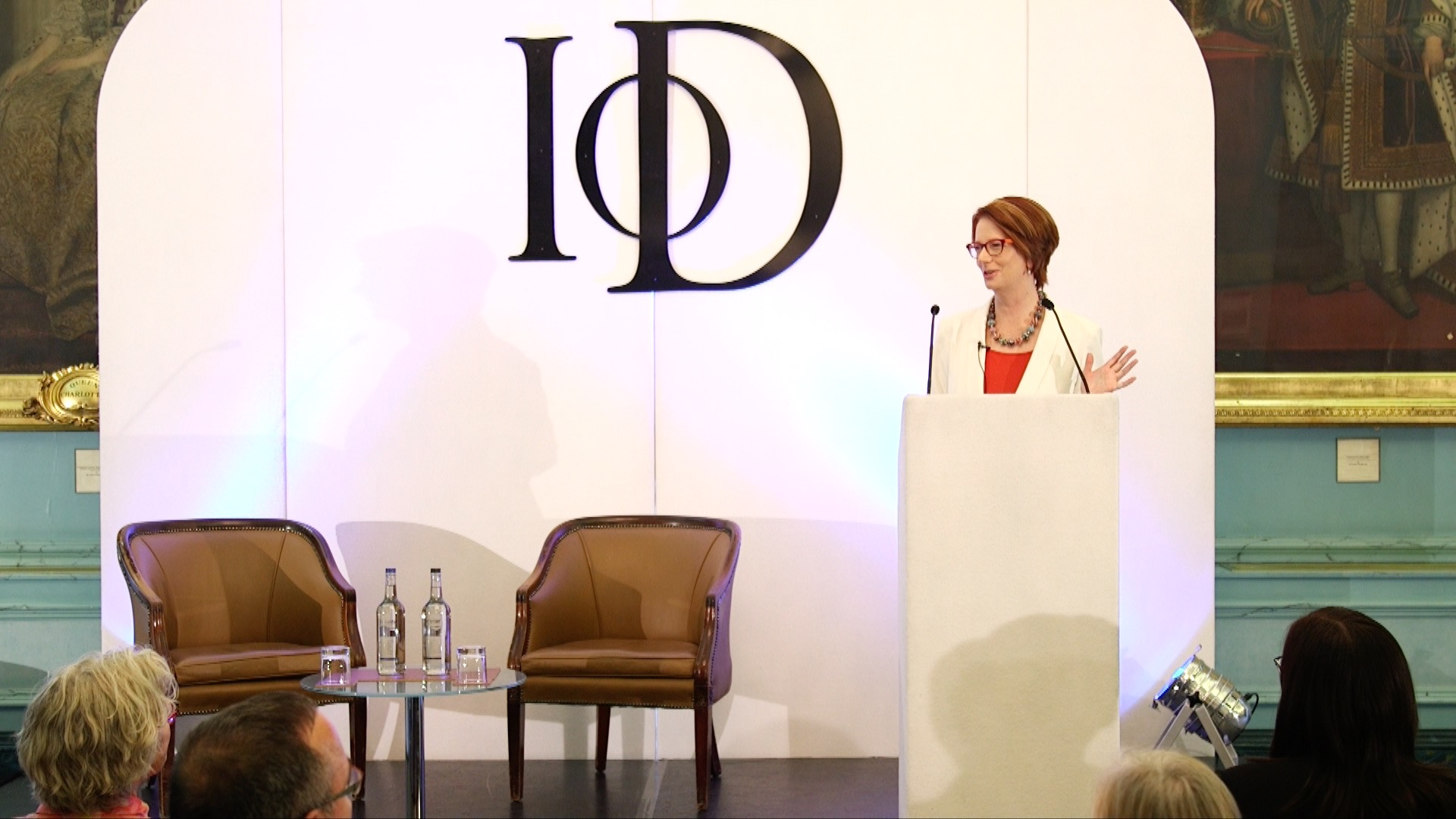
Julia Gillard delivers the inaugural Mackworth Lecture at the IoD, 2015.

The Annual Convention was the flagship IoD event and a fixture of the business calendar, historically taking place at the Royal Albert Hall each year. It drew some of the biggest business names and politicians and leaders from across the world. Until 2016, the convention had taken place every year since 1950. Nine different prime ministers have addressed the convention on more than eighteen occasions along with pioneers such as Jimmy Wales, co-founder of Wikipedia, Richard Branson, serial entrepreneur, and members of the British royal family, including the Prince Philip, Duke of Edinburgh and Charles, Prince of Wales. The last Annual Convention took place in September 2016 and included former Greece finance minister Yanis Varoufakis, Lord Norman Lamont of Lerwick, global economist Dambisa Moyo, and Nicola Sturgeon.

After a year's hiatus, the event was last held in March 2018 billed as "IoD Open House", a three-day business festival held at 116 Pall Mall.

==== Rhondda Lecture ====
In 2015, the IoD launched the annual Rhondda Lecture, in honour of Margaret Mackworth, 2nd Viscountess Rhondda, the first female President of the IoD. The lecture celebrates radical thought, leadership, bold ideas and activism. Julia Gillard, former Australian prime minister, delivered the inaugural lecture in June 2015 at 116 Pall Mall to an audience of politicians, academics, and business leaders. Ruth Davidson, leader of the Scottish Conservative party, gave the 2016 lecture and was interviewed by BBC journalist Laura Kuenssberg at 116 Pall Mall in December.

=== Director magazine ===
Director was a business and lifestyle magazine for business leaders. It was circulated bi-monthly, free to IoD members and available to purchase through subscription. It contained interviews with business leaders and politicians, updates from the IoD, debates on topical issues, reviews and features. In October 2017 the magazine was cut back to six issues per year, and stopped being printed during the Coronavirus pandemic for sustainability reasons.

== Structure and key people ==
Coat of arms of the Institute of Directors
- Crest: Issuant from a circlet Or with eight thrift flowers leaved proper on the rim a pair of scales Gules behind the pivot a compass card as in the arms.
- Shield: Argent on a pale Ermine between a castle of three towers and an argosy in full sail Sable a cross and in the first quarter a sword erect Or on a chief Gules a compass card Gold.
- Supporters: On the dexter side a lion Or gorged with a collar Gules charged with [three] bezants and on the sinister side a dragon Gold winged Argent the underside of the wing charged with a cross Gules.

The IoD is made up of regional divisions and branches across the UK which serve as the local point of contact for IoD members. At the national level, the IoD is governed by a board and a council, which serves as the voice of IoD members.

Barbara, Lady Judge became the IoD's first female chairman in May 2015. She promised to champion women and work to boost the number of women in senior executive positions across British business. In September 2018, she left the organisation under controversial accusations of racism and bullying. She was succeeded by Charlotte Valeur who stood down in August 2020 because of constraints on her time and rumours regarding opposition to a plan to quit the Pall Mall headquarters. Patrick Macdonald was appointed as the new chair in March 2021.

Timothy Melville-Ross, previously chair of Nationwide Building Society, was the IoD's director-general from 1994 to 1999.

Stephen Martin was the director-general until early 2019, having succeeded Simon Walker in October 2016. Martin was a vocal supporter of Brexit. Following his sudden departure from the IoD in January 2019, two months before the UK's scheduled exit from the EU, Jonathan Geldart was appointed as the IoD's new director-general in October 2019.

== 116 Pall Mall ==
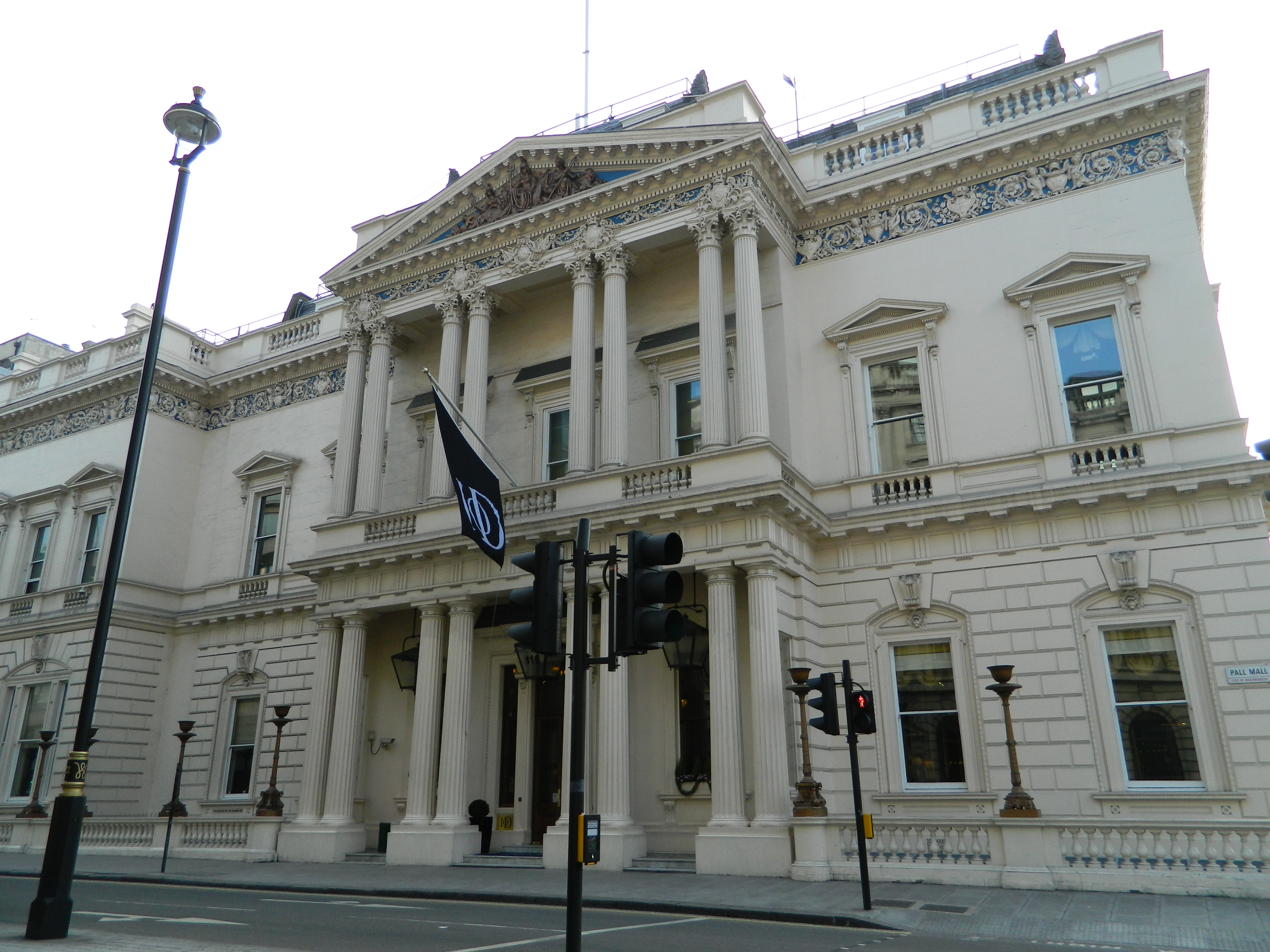
Front entrance of 116 Pall Mall

The IoD occupies the Grade I listed 116 Pall Mall in London, which is open to members of the IoD, and has rooms and function suites available for commercial hire. The building is owned by the Crown Estate, along with the large collection of artwork that decorates the rooms. Until 1978, the building was run by the United Service Club. The building was designed by John Nash, the 19th-century architect who also designed the Brighton Pavilion and Marble Arch, and constructed between 1826 and 1828.

Between 2001 and 2014, members also had use of 123 Pall Mall. This was opened as a contemporary meeting space in contrast with the more traditional 116 Pall Mall, and the interiors were created by noted designers Wayne and Geraldine Hemingway. Despite its popularity with members, the building was closed in 2014 as part of cost-saving measures.

116 Pall Mall has been used as a location for many films and TV programmes, including Gandhi, Foyle's War, Downton Abbey, The Ali G Show, Parks and Recreation and The Dark Knight.
