= HMS Valeur (1705) =

History

France
- Name: Valeur
- Launched: 21 March 1704
- Commissioned: 1704
- Captured: By Royal Navy, 2 April 1705

History

England
- Name: HMS Valeur
- Acquired: purchased by AO 30 May 1705
- Commissioned: May 1705
- Fate: Breaking complete in May 1718

General characteristics
- Type: 24-gun Sixth Rate
- Tons burthen: 321 64/94 bm
- Length: 100 ft 9 in (30.7 m) gundeck; 81 ft 0 in (24.7 m) keel for tonnage
- Beam: 27 ft 4 in (8.3 m) for tonnage
- Depth of hold: 11 ft 8 in (3.6 m)
- Armament: 20 × 6-pdr guns on wooden trucks (UD); 4 × 4-pdr guns on wooden trucks (QD)

HMS Valeur was a 24-gun French sixth rate named Valeur take by HMS Worcester on 2 April 1705 in the Channel. She was purchased at Plymouth by Admiralty Order (AO) 30 May 1705 for £405. (Note: A total cost accounting for inflation of approximately £70,700 in today's money.) She was commissioned into the Royal Navy in 1705 for service in the Mediterranean. From 1706 thru 1708 she was with Admiral Byng's squadron. In Newfoundland, she was taken by the French, then retaken by the British. She spent time in the Irish Sea then was converted to a fireship and then converted back to a sixth rate. She was finally broken up in 1718.

Valeur was the first named vessel in the Royal Navy.

== Specifications ==
She was captured on 2 April 1705 and purchased by Admiralty Order 30 May 1705. Her gundeck was 100 feet 9 inches (30.7 metres) with her keel for tonnage calculation of 81 feet 0 inches (24.7 metres). Her breadth for tonnage was 27 feet 4 inches (8.3 metres) with the depth of hold of 11 ft 8 in (3.6 m). Her tonnage calculation was 321 64/94 tons. Her armament was twenty 6-pounder guns on wooden trucks on the upper deck (UD) and six 6-pounder guns on wooden trucks on the lower deck (LD).

== Commissioned service ==
She was commissioned in May 1705 for service in the Mediterranean. She took the privateer L'Audacieuse on 19 July 1706. She served with Admiral Byng's Squadron through the winter of 1706/07. In 1708 she remained with Admiral Byng's Squadron in the Downs then moved on to Newfoundland. She was taken by the boats of the French privateer La Surprise in Carbonnear Harbour, Newfoundland on 29 September 1710 but was retaken on 12 October 1710 by HMS Essex. She was repurchased from the Essex by Admiralty Order 13 December 1710. In 1711 she was serving in the Irish Sea. She moved back to North America at Maryland in 1715. She paid off in 1716. She underwent a small repair and converted to a fireship at Deptford in March 1717, however, was converted back to a 24-gun sixth rate later in 1717.

== Disposition ==
She was broken at Deptford by Admiralty Order 14 March 1718, completed by May 1718.
