= Department for Business, Innovation, Science and Trade =

UK Government department

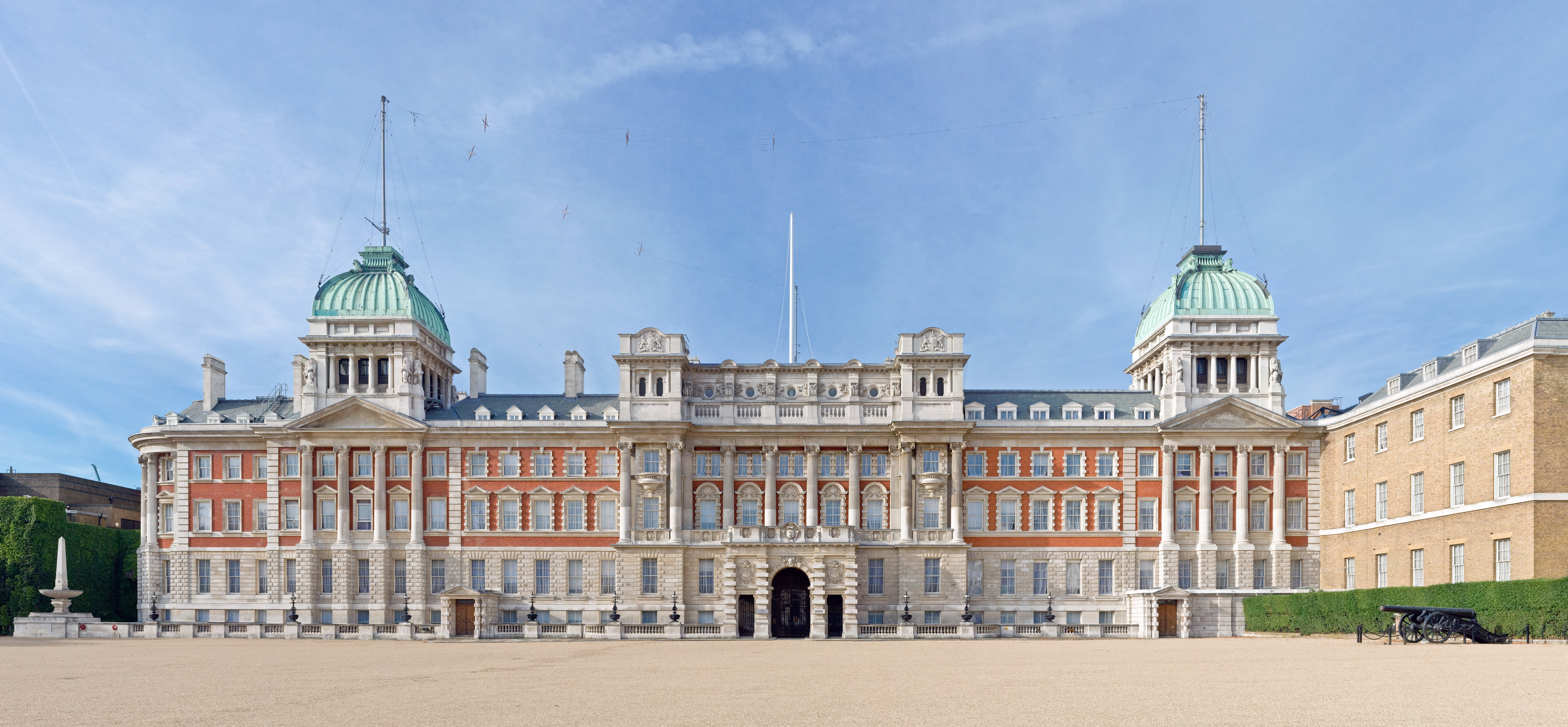
- Old Admiralty Building, Westminster

Department overview
- Formed: 7 February 2023
- Preceding agencies: Department for International Trade; Department for Business, Energy and Industrial Strategy
- Type: UK Government Department
- Jurisdiction: United Kingdom
- Headquarters: Old Admiralty Building, Admiralty Place, London, SW1A 2DY
- Secretary of State responsible: Jonathan Reynolds MP, Secretary of State for Business, Innovation, Science and Trade President of the Board of Trade
- Department executives: Amanda Brooks, Interim Permanent Secretary; Tara Smith, Chief Operating Officer
- Child agencies: Competition and Markets Authority; Trade Remedies Authority; Advisory, Conciliation and Arbitration Service; British Hallmarking Council; Competition Service; Small Business Commissioner; Industrial Development Advisory Board; Low Pay Commission; Regulatory Policy Committee; Companies House; Insolvency Service; Central Arbitration Committee; Competition Appeal Tribunal; Trade and Agriculture Commission; British Business Bank; Certification Officer; Financial Reporting Council; Pubs Code Adjudicator; Independent Complaints Reviewer; Land Registration Rule Committee; Office of Manpower Economics; Office of the Regulator of Community Interest Companies; UK Export Finance; Fair Work Agency; Export Control Joint Unit
- Website: www.gov.uk/government/organisations/department-for-business-innovation-science-and-trade

The Department for Business, Innovation, Science and Trade (BIST) is a ministerial department of the Government of the United Kingdom.

It was established as the Department for Business and Trade (DBT) on 7 February 2023 by a cabinet reshuffle under the Rishi Sunak premiership. The new department absorbed the functions of the former Department for International Trade and some of the functions of the former Department for Business, Energy, and Industrial Strategy.

The department is headed by the Secretary of State for Business, Innovation, Science and Trade, assisted by a number of junior ministers. The incumbent is Jonathan Reynolds.

== Background ==
=== Foundation ===
The department was established as the Department for Business and Trade (DBT) on 7 February 2023. It combines the business-focused responsibilities of the former Department for Business, Energy, and Industrial Strategy (BEIS) with the former Department for International Trade (DIT). The ministers and senior civil servants from DIT were carried over to continue leading the new department.

The creation of the new department was described by Downing Street as an opportunity to provide "a single, coherent voice for business inside government, focused on growing the economy with better regulation, new trade deals abroad, and a renewed culture of enterprise at home".

Under the Burnham ministry, it absorbed the science and innovation portfolios of the Department for Science, Innovation and Technology and was renamed to the Department for Business, Innovation, Science and Trade (BIST).

=== Responsibilities ===
The department's focus was outlined by Downing Street as follows:

- Delivering economic growth opportunities across the economy.
- Backing business by improving access to finance and delivering a pro-enterprise regulatory system;
- Promoting British businesses on the global stage and attracting high-value investment, including through high-quality Free Trade Agreements with India and other priority partners.
- Promoting competitive markets and addressing market distorting practises to support growth whilst protecting consumers;
- Championing free trade;
- Ensuring economic security and supply chain resilience;
- Supporting economic growth and innovation by making the most of Brexit freedoms and removing unnecessary regulatory burdens;
- Delivering legislation on setting minimum service levels for priority public service sectors and to review, reform, retain, and/or repeal retained EU law by December 2023.

=== Export Control Joint Unit ===
The Export Control Joint Unit (ECJU) is a cross-government organisation responsible for administering the United Kingdom's system of strategic export controls. It is based within the Department for Business and Trade and works jointly with the Foreign, Commonwealth and Development Office and the Ministry of Defence.

The ECJU processes applications for licences covering military goods, dual-use items and other strategically controlled exports. It is responsible for implementing the Export Control Act 2002, maintaining the UK's export licensing framework and publishing guidance to exporters.

The unit administers several categories of licences, including Standard Individual Export Licences (SIELs), Open Individual Export Licences (OIELs) and Open General Export Licences (OGELs). It also administers the Open General Transhipment Licence (OGTL), which permits certain controlled goods to transit the United Kingdom under specified conditions.

Although located within the Department for Business and Trade, export licensing decisions are made following input from the Foreign, Commonwealth and Development Office and the Ministry of Defence, with applications assessed against the Strategic Export Licensing Criteria.

While responsibility for licensing decisions sits with the ECJU, enforcement is the responsibility of HM Revenue and Customs.

=== Scrutiny ===
Since 26 April 2023, the work of the department has been scrutinised by the Business and Trade Select Committee of the House of Commons. This is a renaming of the Business Energy and Industrial Strategy Committee, which absorbs the responsibilities of the dissolved International Trade Committee.

== History ==
The department was responsible for finalising negotiations for the UK's to join the Comprehensive and Progressive Agreement for Trans-Pacific Partnership in April 2023, a free-trade agreement (FTA) between 11 countries around the Pacific Rim: Canada, Mexico, Peru, Chile, New Zealand, Australia, Brunei, Singapore, Malaysia, Vietnam and Japan. It successfully concluded an agreement after two years of negotiations.

In April 2021, Gerry Grimstone, Baron Grimstone of Boscobel established the UK Investment Council under the DBT to enhance UK inward investment and inform the trade policy of the UK by providing a forum for global investors to offer high-level advice to the government.

In May 2023, the Minister for Investment, Dominic Johnson, Baron Johnson of Lainston, became the first UK government minister to visit Hong Kong since 2018, and the first since the imposition of a new national security law by Beijing in the Special Administration Region.

In May 2023, the department announced that it had commenced negotiations for a bilateral trade agreement with Switzerland.

== Ministers ==
The DBT ministers are as follows, with cabinet members in bold:

| Minister | Portrait | Office | Portfolio |
|---|---|---|---|
| **Jonathan Reynolds** MP | | Secretary of State for Business, Innovation, Science and Trade; President of the Board of Trade | Overall responsibility for the department. Responsible for leading on departmental strategy and delivering on the department's responsibilities. Also responsible for engaging with business across government, and for making necessary public appointments. The Secretary of State is responsible for leading UK government representation during free trade agreement negotiations, outlining mandates, and making decisions. The Secretary of State also leads UK government representation at meetings of the World Trade Organization, and at ministerial meetings of the G7 and G20 where the Secretary of State is further responsible for developing and maintaining the UK's overseas business network. As President of the Board of Trade, the Secretary of State is responsible for leading engagement with the whole of the UK on the UK's global trade and investment agenda. The role is held concurrently with his position as Secretary of State for Business and Trade. |
| **Kanishka Narayan** MP | | Minister of State for Artificial Intelligence | AI policy; data infrastructure; AI Growth Zones; UK AI research resource; AI for science; robotics; semiconductors; Sovereign AI; AI innovation and economy-wide adoption. Jointly with Cabinet Office. |
| Chris McDonald MP | | Minister of State for Science, Innovation and Investment | Research and development (R&D); UK science, research and innovation; life sciences; tech investment; scale-ups; access to finance; Office for Investment; international tech; engineering biology; quantum; Government Office for Technology Transfer; Government Office for Science; British Business Bank; Advanced Research and Invention Agency; UK Research and Innovation; Innovate UK; National Physical Laboratory; Intellectual Property Office (IPO); Copyright Tribunal; Met Office; British Technology Investments Ltd; Office for Life Sciences. Jointly with Department for Health and Social Care |
| Kate Dearden MP | | Minister of State for the Future of Work | Make Work Pay; industrial relations; parental leave and pay review; labour market enforcement; consumer protection; competition policy; retail and hospitality; consumer goods; product safety; Post Office; postal services; Covid loans; AI and the workforce; Low Pay Commission; Advisory, Conciliation and Arbitration Service (Acas); Fair Work Agency; Pubs Code Adjudicator; British Hallmarking Council; Competition and Markets Authority; Competition Service; Competition Appeal Tribunal; Central Arbitration Committee; Certification Officer |
| Anas Sarwar, Baron Sarwar | | Minister of State for Trade | Trade strategy implementation; World Trade Organization (WTO), G20 and the Comprehensive and Progressive Agreement for Trans-Pacific Partnership (CPTPP); Free Trade Agreements international industrial strategy export strategy and trade promotion EU, Windsor Framework, and UK Internal Market; Ukraine reconstruction; economic resilience; investment security; trade remedies; sanctions; import and export controls; digital trade and trade digitisation; expo; trade Lords legislation; Public bodies: UK Export Finance; Trade Remedies Authority |
| Blair McDougall MP | | Parliamentary Under-Secretary of State for Reindustrialisation | Industrial Strategy implementation; Industrial Strategy Advisory Council; Advanced Manufacturing; Automotive; Aerospace; Chemicals and plastics; Construction; Energy; Infrastructure; Maritime and shipbuilding; Steel; Materials and critical minerals; Industrial Development Advisory Board; Defence; Creative Industries. Jointly for Department for Energy Security and Net Zero. |
| Liz Lloyd, Baroness Lloyd of Effra | | Parliamentary Under-Secretary of State for Space, Cyber and Regulatory Reform | Space; Regulatory Innovation Office; regulation; corporate governance; insolvency; One Platform One Login; tech standards; Smart Data; science and innovation Lords legislation; Companies House; The Insolvency Service; Office of the Regulator of Community Interest Companies; Financial Reporting Council. Jointly with Department for Digital, Culture, Media and Sport. |
| Sonny Leong, Baron Leong | | Parliamentary Under-Secretary of State for Small Business and Enterprise | Entrepreneurs and small businesses; Professional Business Services; education exports; departmental corporate minister; business Lords legislation; Small Business Commissioner |

== See also ==
- Department for International Trade – preceding body from 2016 to 2023
- Department for Business, Energy, and Industrial Strategy – preceding body from 2016 to 2023
- Department of Trade and Industry – UK government department with a historically similar function from 1970 to 2007
