= Carers UK =

UK charity

- Formation: 1988
- Type: Charity
- Headquarters: Southwark, London SE1 4LX
- Region served: United Kingdom
- Key people: Helen Walker (Chief Executive); Nick Baird CMG CVO (Chair)
- Website: www.carersuk.org

Carers UK is the main membership charity in the United Kingdom for carers. It was formed by the merger of two existing voluntary organisations on 14 May 1988. Originally constituted as Carers National Association, it was renamed Carers UK in 2001.

== Purpose ==
Carers UK provides information to carers and leads campaigns to improve carers' rights and tackle inequality. It has been instrumental in securing the first ever legal rights for carers. These include the Carers (Recognition and Services) Act 1995, the Carers and Disabled Children Act 2000, the Carers (Equal Opportunities) Act 2004 and the Work and Families Act 2006.

Carers UK organises Carers Rights Day, produces leaflets and a magazine, and has a free telephone and email helpline.

== Governance and organisation ==
Carers UK is a trustee-led organisation, with a membership of approximately 45,000 individual members. Members at the AGM approve the appointment of the trustees who must always be a majority of carers.

Carers UK operates out of four major UK cities – London (headquarters), Glasgow, Belfast and Cardiff. National committees exist in the devolved nations with some degree of autonomy to formulate local responses to the national devolved assemblies and their policy processes.

Nick Baird is Chair. The Chief Executive is Helen Walker. The organisation's registered address is 20 Great Dover Street, London SE1 4LX.

== History and origins ==
In January 1963, the Reverend Mary Webster wrote a letter to The Times concerning the difficulties that confronted single women facing the complex task of earning the family living and caring for the home, the sick and the elderly. Her letters to newspapers, journals, MPs and peers drew attention to the isolation and financial hardship that women carers were suffering, and generated a huge response from hundreds of women in similar situations.

As a result of Webster's efforts, the National Council for the Single Woman and her Dependants (NCSWD) was formed in 1965. Baroness Seear was an early supporter. Due to her intervention, a meeting was held in the Grand Committee Room of the House of Commons. Other early supporters and fundraisers included Sir Keith Joseph MP.

The NCSWD was instrumental in securing the first ever right for carers in the Dependant Tax Allowance in 1967 as well as contributing towards the campaign to introduce Attendance Allowance, the benefit for people aged over 65, as well as securing Invalid Care Allowance, later renamed Carer's Allowance which is still the main benefit for carers today.

In 1981, Judith Oliver, a carer for her husband, founded the Association of Carers, aided by a grant of £9,879 from the Equal Opportunities Commission. The group campaigned for Invalid Care Allowance to be extended to married women. Following a test case brought to the European Court on behalf of Jackie Drake, in June 1986 the government was forced to capitulate.

In 1982, The National Council for the Single Woman and Her Dependants was renamed The National Council for Carers and their Elderly Dependants in an attempt to be more inclusive. Carers National Association was formed by the merger of the two existing voluntary organisations on 14 May 1988, and was renamed Carers UK in 2001.

== See also ==
- Carer's Allowance
- Carers' rights movement
- Invalid Care Allowance
