= Charlotte Valeur =

Danish merchant banker

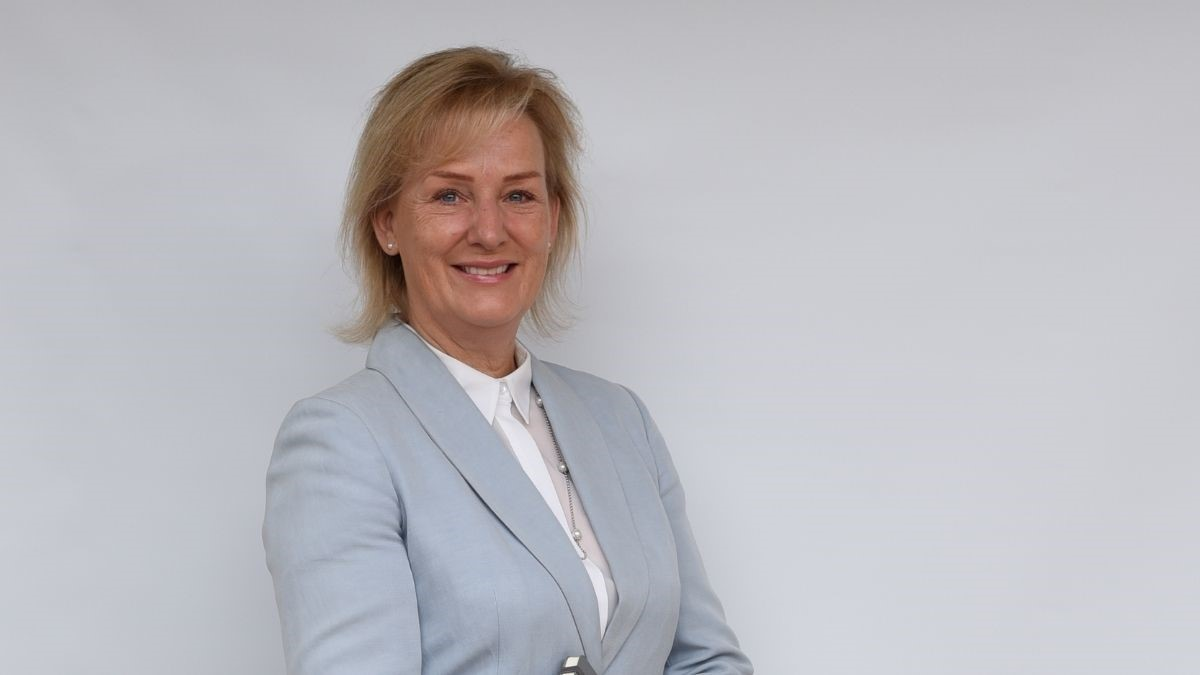
- Valeur in 2021
- Born: 1964 (age 60–61); Copenhagen, Denmark
- Occupations: merchant banker, chair of Institute of Directors (2018-2020)
- Known for: Founder, Institute of Neurodiversity

Kirsten Charlotte Valeur (born January 1964) is a Danish former merchant banker, corporate governance expert, and a former chair of the UK's Institute of Directors. She has chaired three international companies and has non-executive directorships at private and public companies. She has been called "a boardroom diversity champion". In July 2020, Valeur said that she is on the autism spectrum, and launched the Institute Of Neurodiversity just over a year later.

== Early life ==
Valeur was born in January 1964 in Copenhagen. Her mother, Kirsten Valeur Rosenbeck-Hansen, was a teacher; her father, Leo Balleby, was a butcher. Valeur was raised in Copenhagen. When Valeur was seven years old, her mother, 36, died of breast cancer, which Valeur later said was "a defining moment": "I felt that I should live the life she didn't have. ... I also think going through all that has given me a resilience, which has helped me throughout my life." Raised by her father, Valeur credits him for her focus on ethics and equality. "My dad always told me: 'Everybody has equal value, so treat people with respect, no matter what.'"

Valeur earned a bachelor level degree in accounting & economics in 1983 from Copenhagen Business College (Danish: Købmandsskolen i København). In 1987, she graduated with a bachelor's in banking from the Institute of Danish Bankers/Bankskolen in Copenhagen, where she studied banking, financial accountancy, economics, and banking law. Valeur returned to Købmandsskolen i København in 1988, earning a bachelor of commerce when she graduated in 1990, specialising in organisation, management, financial planning, and investments. Valeur speaks six languages.

== Career ==
=== Banking ===
Valeur began her career in 1982 as a fixed-income trader for the Scandinavian bank Nordea in Copenhagen. In 1991 she moved to the London office of Nordea A/S as Head of the UK Fixed Income Sales group, later becoming Vice President of SG Warburg. In 1992, Valeur joined BNP Paribas as a director and in 1998 joined Société Générale also as director.

=== Directorships ===
Valeur has held seven directorships at public companies, including three as chair since 2009. In 2009, Valeur joined 3i Infrastructure fund as a director. In 2014, Valuer joined Kennedy Wilson European Real Estate and Blackstone Loan Financing as chair. Whilst at Kennedy Wilson European Real Estate, Valeur oversaw the $8 billion merger of Kennedy Wilson Europe Real Estate with its US-listed parent. In 2015, Valeur oversaw the sale of AIM-listed company, Renewable Energy Generation, where she was an independent director, to BlackRock in 2015. In 2017, Valeur joined the University of Westminster as governor and director. In March 2018, Valeur joined the board of the construction firm Laing O'Rourke, a position she still holds today.

=== Private equity ===
Valeur founded Brook Street Partners in 2003, a private equity firm, which raises finance for investment. By 2011, Brook Street Partners counted many top UK and Scandinavian institutions as clients, to whom it provided an advisory service, matching their investment needs by sourcing appropriate [asset] managers.

=== Corporate governance ===
Valeur is a specialist in corporate governance, founding (in 2009) and running her own advisory firm, the Global Governance Group.

=== Board Apprentice ===
In 2013, Valeur founded Board Apprentice, a not-for-profit organisation dedicated to increasing diversity on boards globally. It does this primarily by allowing prospective directors to sit in on other companies' board discussions, thereby gaining board experience for a future role. She has been called a boardroom diversity champion, partly thanks to Board Apprentice - now also a phrase used globally to refer to senior professionals gaining board experience through occupying a seat at the board room table reserved for education of tomorrow's directors.

In an interview with The Sunday Times, Valeur said she set the organisation up because "I kept hearing directors say, 'We would like to appoint more women but there are none with board experience'. So I thought about how we could help them to get that experience. Boards are the only place they can get it — but appointing someone who has no listed company experience is a risk to the board and to all the other directors, who have full personal liability, so they are understandably reluctant to do that. ... My first idea was to set up fake board meetings that could be used to teach people, but it's just not the same thing. It needs to be real."

Valeur told ITV it is an "insult to the stakeholders and there is absolutely no excuse for not having a diverse board".

"We need to help new participants from under-represented groups to develop the confidence of working on boards and to come to know that."

=== Education and mentoring ===
In April 2017, Valeur set up U25 Mentoring, a scheme which turned traditional mentoring on its head by encouraging board members to take advice from 18- to 25-year-olds rather than give it, launched in Jersey. Valeur said, "a lot of young people are complaining that they are not getting connections in business and they want to be involved at a higher level...Companies are losing out because they don't get what is going on in the current climate. So many companies are dangerously out of touch with the younger generation."

Valeur is currently a visiting professor in Governance at the University of Strathclyde and on the advisory board of the Møller Centre at Churchill College, Cambridge.

=== London Stock Exchange ===
In September 2018, Valeur joined the London Stock Exchange as a member of the primary markets group.

=== Institute of Directors ===
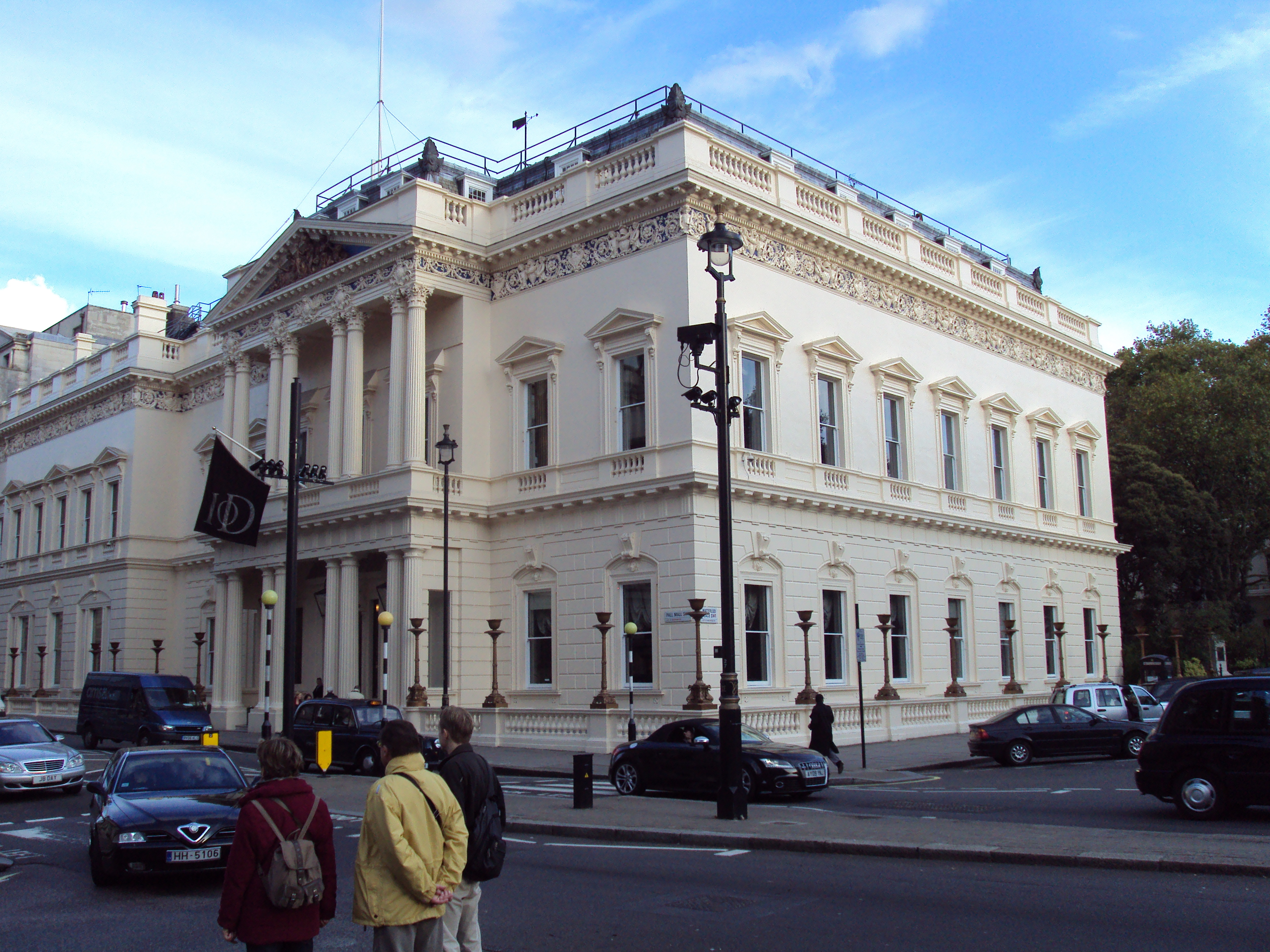
Institute of Directors building, Pall Mall

Valeur was appointed chair of the UK's Institute of Directors (IoD) on 3 September 2018. In her appointment statement, Valeur said "I see it as an exciting opportunity to contribute to the IoD as it embraces the needs of the modern business leader."

==== IoD turnaround ====
In a January 2019 interview, the Financial Times reported Valeur wanted to "stall" and then "reverse" the decline in IoD membership, initiating a turnround that would see "much more diversity across the IoD as well, not just gender but on ethnicity and younger people". Valeur said of her priorities "the cost base [of the IoD] is going up whilst the income is going down – that cannot continue." In terms of her initial priorities, she said they are "...to ensure that we have everything in place in terms of governance and that we get a turnround. I'm more interested in that than I am in having meetings with politicians", she said. Valeur is reported to have said during her interview with the IoD that "...if you're not up for real change then don't talk to me. When you want to do a turnround that's what I came here for."

==== Executive pay ====
In March 2019, Valeur called for directors of quoted companies to take a more responsible approach to executive pay, arguing "if you start your own company and you run your own company, you can pay yourself as much as you want. If you run a company that other people's money is funding, you have to be having a proper balance between what you get paid and what the company earns." That balance should extend to executives when companies are cutting costs, Valeur said. "I think we all have to share the pain when there's pain to share."

==== Boardroom diversity ====
Throughout her time with the IoD, Valeur was a vocal advocate of boardroom diversification, often speaking publicly on the issue and criticising large, listed companies for not achieving diversity targets. Valeur had restructured the IoD's own board when she took her post. The new board had a 50/50 split of men and women, and 30% were not white. In an interview, she said "do we really think [diversity is] difficult? It's a lie. It's not difficult...People don't like change. Talent of all kinds is out there, but you have to consciously look for it."

On 8 February 2020, it was announced that the UK's top companies had reached a government-supported diversity target almost one year early, for women to constitute a third of all board members in FTSE 100 companies. UK business secretary Andrea Leadsom was reported to have welcomed the development, achieved without having to threaten companies with fines or penalties for failing to appoint women to their boards. Valeur said it was right to celebrate the progress made, showing that focussing the spotlight on diversity can change the behaviours of big companies. However, this was not a case of 'job done'. There is still a glaring lack of diversity at executive level and among chairs, and firms must continue to strive towards a more inclusive culture or they risk slipping backwards.

==== IoD Centre for Corporate Governance ====
On 30 June 2020, Valeur launched the IoD Centre for Corporate Governance, a new initiative seeking to explore how companies are — and could be — run. One person familiar with the project described her as the driving force behind it. Her work on the centre was supported by senior City figures including former Lloyd's of London chief executive Inga Beale, London Stock Exchange executive Marcus Stuttard, and BlackRock stewardship head Amra Balic.

==== Standing down ====
In August 2020, When the IoD announced proposals for a significant restructure to deal with the impact of COVID-19, Valeur said this meant she could no longer provide the necessary leadership. Valeur stood down from the IoD citing constraints on her time. She said "In recent months it has become clear that the IoD is going through a stage in its evolution where it is likely to need increasing levels of hands-on involvement from its chair, and more than was anticipated...when I took on the role", she wrote in a message to IoD members. "I have concluded that I will find it difficult to provide this amount of time during the pandemic, being resident in Jersey and in a vulnerable household." The IoD's board said it was "very grateful... for the substantial contribution that she has made to the turnround and continued success of the institute."

== Institute Of Neurodiversity ==
In late 2021, Valeur launched the Institute of Neurodiversity (ION) in the UK, Europe, and Australia to give a voice in the world to all neurodivergent individuals, to campaign for inclusion for neurodivergent people, to make sure they are understood, represented, and valued equally. It is based in Geneva, Switzerland, and is the world's only umbrella organisation that represents all neurominorities.

By bringing all neurodiverse groups together, ION aims to create a single, unified community that supports and celebrates the multitude of contributions of neurodivergent people throughout all sections of society. As Neurodiversity has long been regarded as something to "overcome" or assimilate, ION seeks to challenge this view, and will lobby government and industry, the education and charity sectors, to promote a greater understanding of the reality of being neurodiverse. It will also work toward eliminating institutional discrimination. The organisation will work on building more awareness around the reality of being neurodiverse, ensuring neurodiverse voices are part of educational, research and mental health programmes developed for [the neurodiverse] community, providing leadership training and to provide networking opportunities to foster a deeper sense of community among neurodiverse groups. ION aims to have 1 million members drawn from 100 countries by 2025.

Talking to the Financial Times, Valeur said: "We [neurodiverse people] are everywhere in everything, all layers, all cultures, but all marginalised to degrees, which is something that needs to stop. The ultimate goal is that we don't need all the sub-labels; that we are simply being accepted for who we are, as people in society." Valeur rejects the idea that neurodiversity is a problem to overcome, arguing that this leads to institutional discrimination. The ION wants reform of "conversion therapies" that aim to "cure" neurodiversity but which Valeur regards as cruel and discriminatory. Valeur also wants the ION to become a community for neurodiverse people, "to celebrate that we are here, as opposed to look for a way to get rid of us." ION also wants businesses not to expect employees who are neurodiverse to assimilate, and to work toward eliminating institutional discrimination. Research found that only 58 percent of autistic workers want to reveal their diagnosis to HR. Valeur thinks this is one area where Valeur can make a difference: providing support for neurodivergent people in their professional lives will be a key focus.

In an interview with Raconteur, Valeur said: "Once you've climbed the very greasy corporate ladder, then you can become concerned about losing the gains you've made. It was a concern for me when I opened up about [my autism]. But it's something I'd like to see more of my peers to do. We need more senior executives to be role models and show courage, to help lead the way."

== Personal life ==
=== Autism ===
On 13 July 2020, Valeur said that she is on the autism spectrum. She was diagnosed as autistic in 2017. Speaking to the Independent, she told employers: "The focus should be on what a person's abilities are, what they can bring to the job. We need to do more with this because we are losing out on talent. We need to change the narrative." An HR industry magazine report viewed speaking out about her diagnosis as an act of bravery when no other such business leaders had "come out with autism or similar neurodiverse conditions". Valeur said: "For years, autistic people have been encouraged to fit in with the neurotypical world, or else get left behind. When really, the world and the workplace should become more accepting and accommodating of us... Many bright autistic people… feel overwhelmed by the traditional interview process, or struggle to thrive in a workplace that celebrates extroverts, so they miss out."

In 2015, after a childhood friend asked if she thought she was autistic, Valeur took an online test. "I went through the full diagnostics", she says. "And I scored high on everything. I'm not even marginally autistic. I'm full-on autistic." It was another two years before her diagnosis was professionally confirmed. And although nothing outwardly changed (her siblings appear to have taken the news in their stride), in reality, everything changed: "So many people say 'suddenly it all makes sense'."

Growing up in Copenhagen, she'd been marginalised at school ("I was a very quiet child"), and gained less than spectacular grades. "I came out of school believing that I was stupid", she recalls, "because they didn't know what to do with me. You find that a lot of autistic boys, especially, end up being expelled from school – that is just how the school system works. They don't fit in and league tables are not helping."

Valeur's work in banking helped: she excelled as a banker in both Copenhagen and London – "a bit of a female trailblazer in capital markets" and a blunt-speaking "one of the boys". "It was more difficult for me to relate to women", she says, citing research that suggests autism is more of a "male" syndrome. "Autistic women tend to be more like neurotypical men", she says. "They might be tomboys when they're young, which people felt I was. I remember wanting to be a princess, but I also liked sitting in trees, because it's safer to be up a tree than down on the ground with all the people."

"I think it was because I fell into an area that I really liked within banking, numbers. I used to write down license plates as a little girl because I liked looking at lines of numbers. So going into a world of numbers worked really well for me. To be honest, on the stock exchange and in the dealing rooms where [I spent] about 20 years there seemed to be a lot of people like me."

Valeur said boards need to prioritise neurodiversity and recognise that differences in brain function that cause dyslexia, autism and attention deficit hyperactivity disorder can also boost performance in organisations. "If everybody just follows the set rules and never questions them we would not move forward", she said.

== Honours and awards ==
In 2014, Valeur was listed in The 2014 IFC Power Women Top 200 by City Wealth Magazine. In 2017, Valeur won "Director of the Year for a Small Organisation" in the Jersey Director of the Year Awards, organised by IoD Jersey. In 2018, Valeur was listed as one of Denmark's 100 most influential women, chosen because they have influence, create results, or move the agenda.
