= Department for International Trade =

Defunct department of the UK Government

Department overview
- Formed: 14 July 2016
- Preceding department: UK Trade & Investment; Department for Business, Innovation and Skills
- Dissolved: 7 February 2023
- Superseding department: Department of Business and Trade
- Jurisdiction: Government of the United Kingdom
- Headquarters: Old Admiralty Building, Admiralty Place, Whitehall, LONDON, SW1A 2DY
- Minister responsible: Secretary of State for International Trade, President of the Board of Trade
- Department executive: Permanent Secretary; Second Permanent Secretary and Chief Trade Negotiation Adviser
- Child department: UK Export Finance
- Website: gov.uk/dit

The Department for International Trade (DIT) was a department of the United Kingdom Government, from July 2016 to February 2023. It was responsible for striking and extending trade agreements between the United Kingdom and foreign countries, as well as for encouraging foreign investment and export trade.

DIT's purpose was to develop, coordinate and deliver a new trade policy for the United Kingdom, including preparing for and then negotiating free trade agreements and market access deals with non-EU countries.

The final Secretary of State for International Trade, was Kemi Badenoch. On 7 February 2023, the department was merged in a reshuffle with parts of the former Department for Business, Energy and Industrial Strategy to form the new Department for Business and Trade. Badenoch became Secretary of State for Business and Trade.

The department was scrutinised by the International Trade Select Committee.

== History ==
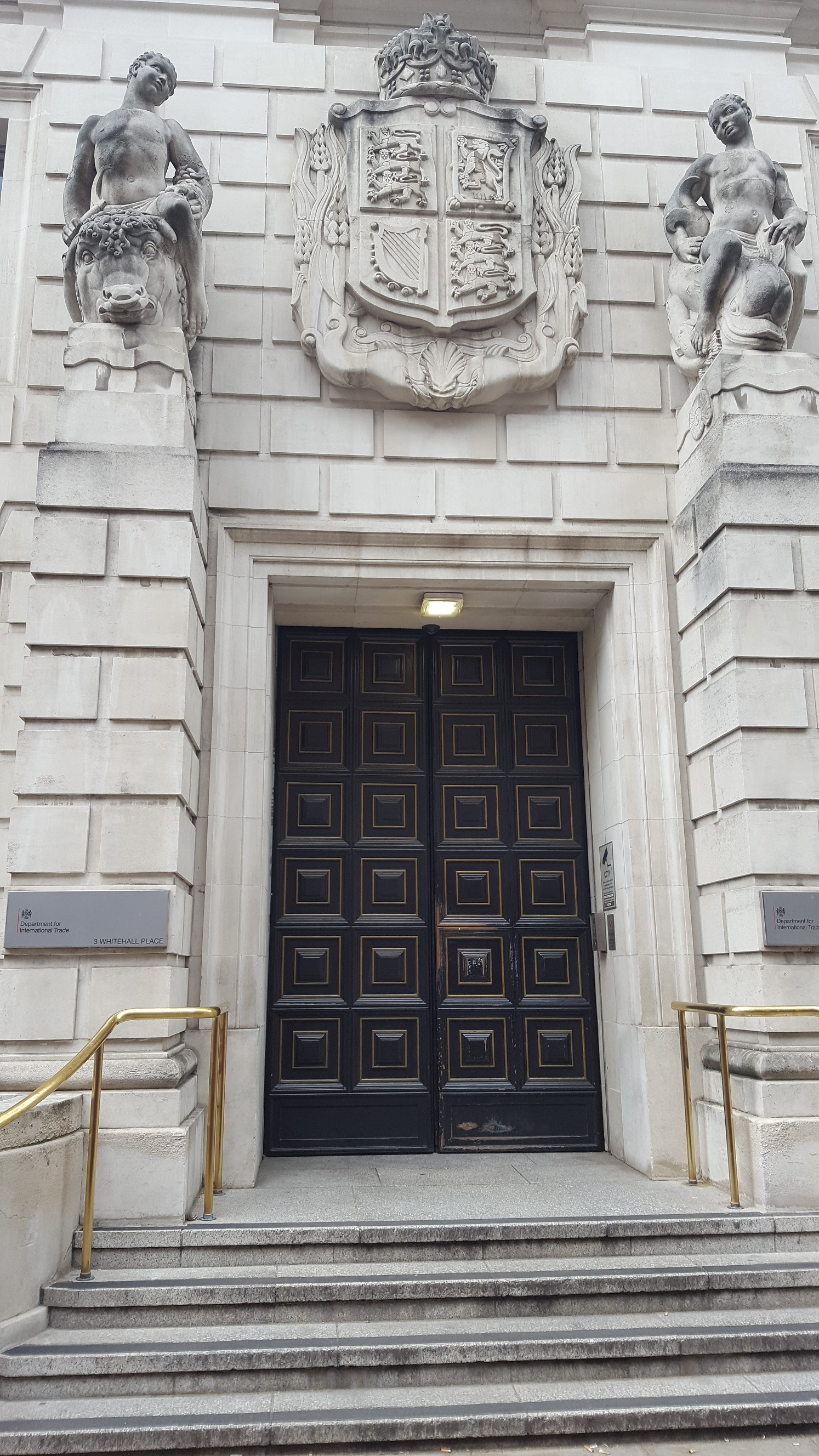
The entrance to the Department for International Trade's headquarters off Whitehall, Central London

The department was created by former Prime Minister Theresa May, shortly after she took office on 13 July 2016, following the United Kingdom's vote to leave the European Union. It took on the responsibilities of UK Trade & Investment, which was previously operated by both the Foreign Office and the Department for Business, Innovation and Skills; it also took on the latter's other relevant trade functions, as well as responsibility for UK Export Finance. In doing so, the department can trace its institutional history back to the longstanding Department of Trade and Industry (1970-2007), itself formed from a merger of the Board of Trade with the short-lived Ministry of Technology in 1970.

The Board of Trade was the government body, arising from the Privy Council with historic responsibility for British commerce and industry. When the UK joined the European Economic Community in 1973, the Board lost most of its powers and responsibilities, which had become a competencies of the EEC, later the European Union. Nevertheless, the Board persisted as a dormant institution whose presidency remained a subsidiary title of the Secretary of State with responsibilities for trade. In 2017 the Board was reconstituted as an advisory body, designed to engage with the whole of the UK on the UK’s global trade and investment agenda, with a focus on promoting the UK regions as destinations to trade and do business with. The Board's president remains the Secretary of State for International Trade, who by virtue of their membership of the Privy Council, is the only member. Advisors to the Board include industry leaders, academics, junior ministers in the Department for International Trade, and the Secretaries of State for Scotland, Wales, and Northern Ireland. The reports of the Board of Trade are an important form of policy direction for the Department for International Trade.

By February 2017, the department employed about 200 trade negotiators.

The department was dissolved on 7 February 2023, and its functions and personnel transferred to the new Department for Business and Trade.

== Ministers ==
The final roster of Ministers in the Department for International Trade were as follows:

Minister	Portrait	Title	Portfolio
Kemi Badenoch MP		Secretary of State; President of the Board of Trade; Minister for Women and Equalities	The Secretary of State is responsible for securing world-class free trade agreements and reducing market access barriers, ensuring that consumers and businesses can benefit from both; encouraging economic growth and a green industrial revolution across all parts of the UK through attracting and retaining inward investment. They are responsible for supporting UK business to take full advantage of trade opportunities, including those arising from delivering free trade agreements, facilitating UK exports. Additionally they champion the rules-based international trading system and operating the UK’s new trading system, including protecting UK businesses from unfair trade practices. As Minister for Women and Equalities, the Secretary of State also has responsibility for developing an equalities policy that is based on individual autonomy and dignity and for promoting equality of opportunity for everyone.
Greg Hands MP		Minister of State for Trade Policy	The Minister of State supports the Secretary of State with all free trade agreements, trade remedies, the Board of Trade, market access strategy, and union policy. The Minister is also responsible for external engagement via the Strategic Trade Advisory Group, sectoral trade advisory groups, trade union advisory groups, civil society and think tank roundtables.
Dominic Johnson, Baron Johnson of Lainston		Minister of State for Investment	The Minister of State encourages economic growth and a green industrial revolution across all parts of the UK through attracting and retaining inward investment. The minister’s responsibilities include: investment promotion across all sectors, the Office for Investment, delivering an investment strategy to drive further inward investment to the UK, investor relationship management, Sovereign Investment Partnerships, and delivering key investment events. This role has typically been the domain of a member of the House of Lords.
Nigel Huddleston MP		Minister of State for International Trade	The Minister is responsible for supporting the Secretary of State with: trade remedies, tariffs, disputes, parliamentary and legislative activity, sanctions and trade defence, securing global supply chains, the Export Control Joint Unit (ECJU), and the Department for International Trade’s corporate activity.
Andrew Bowie MP		Parliamentary Under-Secretary of State for Exports	The Minister's responsibilities include export promotion across all sectors, UK Export Finance (UKEF), trade missions and trade shows. The minister also supports the Secretary of State with the delivery of an export strategy to boost exports across the UK, supporting small and medium sized businesses to export, the Trade Envoy programme, and the Department's contribution to the GREAT campaign - the government's flagship international communications programme designed to drive national economic growth by encouraging an international audience to visit, study, trade, invest, live and work in the UK.
Maria Caulfield MP		Parliamentary Under Secretary of State for Women	Supporting the Secretary of State in their role as Minister for Women and Equalities.
Stuart Andrew MP		Parliament Under Secretary of State for Equalities	Supporting the Secretary of State in their role as Minister for Women and Equalities.

The role of Minister of State for International Trade was downgraded, soon after Rishi Sunak became Prime Minister in October 2022, to the more junior rank of Parliamentary Under-Secretary. At the same time, Kemi Badenoch's assumption of the role of Minister for Women and Equalities saw the appointment of two additional Parliamentary Under-Secretaries to support this additional portfolio. Badenoch retained the portfolio for Women and Equalities when the department was dissolved and merged.

== Trade remedies ==
After Britain left the EU, the Trade Remedies Investigations Directorate (TRID) of the Department for International Trade was created to investigate whether new trade remedies are needed to prevent injury to UK industries caused by unfair trading practices and unforeseen surges in imports. These remedies usually take the form of additional duties on those imports.

Following Royal Assent of the Trade Act 2021, TRID became an independent arm's-length body, the Trade Remedies Authority (TRA), on 1 June 2021. The Authority is based in Reading.
