= HMS Valeur (1759) =

Frigate of the Royal Navy

History

France
- Name: Valeur
- Builder: Rochefort shipyard
- Laid down: March 1754
- Launched: 29 October 1754
- Completed: May 1755
- Captured: 18 October 1759, by the Royal Navy

Great Britain
- Name: HMS Valeur
- Acquired: Captured on 18 October 1759; Purchased on 13 December 1759
- Fate: Sold on 26 January 1764

General characteristics
- Class & type: 28-gun sixth-rate frigate
- Tons burthen: 524 (bm
- Length: 115 ft 6 in (35.2 m) (overall); 93 ft 4 in (28.4 m) (keel)
- Beam: 32 ft 6 in (9.9 m)
- Depth of hold: 10 ft 10 in (3.30 m)
- Sail plan: Full-rigged ship
- Complement: 200
- Armament: Upper deck: 18 × 9-pounder guns + 6 × 6-pounder guns; QD: 4 × 3-pounder guns

HMS Valeur was a 28-gun sixth-rate frigate of the Royal Navy, initially launched in 1754 as the Valeur for the French Navy, and classified by them as a corvette. The British captured her in 1759. In Royal Navy service she captured several merchant vessels and privateers before she was sold in 1764.

== Origins ==
Valeur was built between March 1754 and May 1755 at Rochefort to a design by François-Guillaume Clairin-Deslauriers. She was launched on 29 October 1754. Her career with the French Navy lasted five years.

== Capture ==
She was serving in the Mediterranean when on 15 April 1759 HMS Favourite, then a 14-gun sloop under the command of Commander Timothy Edwards, serving with a British squadron under Edward Boscawen, engaged her and forced her to surrender. (Note: Colledge and Winfield give HMS Lively as the Valeur's captor, and the date as 18 October 1759. This appears to be a mistake. On 18 October 1760, Lively captured a French privateer also named Valeur, but this occurred on the Jamaica station. In 1759 Favourite was on the Mediterranean station. The NMM gives the date of capture for Valeur as October 1758, which is not consistent with Beatson, Colledge, Winfield or the record for Favourite.) The previous day Favourite and HMS Thetis had captured a French merchant vessel sailing from Martinique. (Note: It is possible that the second British vessel was not Thetis but another vessel as records indicate that Thetis became a hospital ship in 1757.) The next day the two British vessels saw and gave chase to two more French vessels. Favourite was able to catch up with one of them when the wind failed and she could use her oars. After an engagement that lasted some two-and-a-half hours at the onset of which Edwards had succeeded in wrong-footing Valeur, Valeur surrendered. When the engagement ended Favorite had only two rounds and a half of powder left, having fired 50 broadsides.

Valeur had twenty 9-pounder guns, four 12-pounder guns, and a crew of 110 men. Favourite had only sixteen 6-pounder guns and four 3-pounder guns, though she too had a nominal crew of 110 men. (Note: At the time of the engagement she had several men away on the prize she taken the previous day. She also had 25 prisoners who required guarding.) In the engagement, Valeur had 13 men killed and 9 wounded; Favourite suffered extensive damage to her hull, masts, yards and rigging, but had only seven men wounded. Valeur was carrying a valuable cargo of sugar, coffee and indigo.

== Royal Navy career ==
The Admiralty purchased Valeur at Gibraltar on 13 December 1759. The Royal Navy commissioned her as a post-ship and Boscawen awarded command of her to Edwards (and promotion to post-captain in recognition of his feat in capturing a better-armed vessel than his own. Edwards apparently took command in August 1759. (Note: The same records suggest that Valeur was commissioned at that time.) While under Edward's command Valeur captured the privateer Heureux Retour on 5 July 1760. Heureux Retour, of Marseilles, was armed with eight guns and had a crew of 56 men.

Also in 1760, Valeur captured two Genoese merchant ships. One, sailing from Marseilles to St. Domingo, she took into Gibraltar. The other, sailing to Martinique, she took into Barcelona.

In January–February 1761, Edwards took a British consul to Algiers to demand restitution from the Dey of Algiers for the plundering of the Mary which had been traveling from Lancaster to Gambia when she had encountered an Algerine privateer off Cape Finisterre.

Captain Robert Lambert took over command in 1761. In 1762 Valeur captured several vessels in the Mediterranean:

- pinque Esperance (5 March);
- privateer Belle Etoile (7 April), in company with HMS Gibraltar;
- pinque Ste. Famille (19 April);
- tartane St. Joseph (22 April);
- settee Sto. Christo (16 July), in company with HMS Quebec and the privateer Bee; and,
- xebec St. Joseph, a privateer (28 September).

== Fate ==
Lambert paid off Valeur in October 1763 and she was surveyed on 3 October 1763. She was then sold at Woolwich Dockyard on 26 January 1764 for £905.
