= Hove by-election =

Hove by-election may refer to:

- 1965 Hove by-election
- 1973 Hove by-election
