= Hove and Portslade =

UK parliamentary constituency from 1950

Coordinates: 50.84°N 0.18°W

- Borough constituency for the House of Commons
- Boundaries since 2010
- Boundary of Hove and Portslade in South East England
- County: East Sussex
- Electorate: 73,726 (2023)
- Major settlements: Aldrington; Hove; Portslade

Current constituency
- Created: 1950 (as Hove)
- Member of Parliament: Peter Kyle (Labour Party)
- Created from: Brighton; Lewes

Hove and Portslade (Hove until 2024) is a borough constituency in East Sussex represented in the House of Commons of the UK Parliament since 2015 by Peter Kyle of the Labour Party, who served as Secretary of State for Business and Trade and President of the Board of Trade in the government of Keir Starmer.

In the 2023 review of Westminster constituencies, there were no changes to the constituency boundaries, but it was renamed to Hove from the 2024 general election.

== Constituency profile ==
Hove and Portslade is a mostly urban and suburban constituency located in East Sussex. It covers part of the coastal city of Brighton and Hove and forms part of its wider urban area. The constituency includes the districts of Hove, Portslade, Mile Oak and Hangleton. Traditionally fishing villages, Hove and Portslade grew rapidly during the 19th century with the development of neighbouring Brighton as a popular seaside resort, and now function as districts of the city. At 8.6% of the population, the constituency has the seventh highest proportion of LGBTQ+ people in the country. It has average levels of wealth and deprivation, and house prices are higher than regional and national averages.

In general, residents of Hove and Portslade are young, well-educated and irreligious. They have low rates of homeownership, but household income is higher than the national average and similar to the rest of South East England. A high proportion of residents work in education and finance. White people made up 86% of the population at the 2021 census, a similar percentage to the country as a whole. At the local city council, most of the constituency is represented by Labour Party councillors, with some Conservatives elected in the wealthy suburbs in the constituency's northeast. Voters in Hove and Portslade strongly supported remaining in the European Union in the 2016 referendum, with an estimated 61% voting to remain compared to 48% nationwide.

== Boundaries ==
1950–1983: The County Borough of Hove, and the Urban District of Portslade-by-Sea.

1983–2010: The Borough of Hove.

2010–2023: The City of Brighton and Hove wards of Brunswick and Adelaide, Central Hove, Goldsmid, Hangleton and Knoll, Hove Park, North Portslade, South Portslade, Westbourne, and Wish.

2023–present: Further to a local government boundary review which came into effect in May 2023, the constituency now comprises the following wards of the City of Brighton and Hove:

- Brunswick and Adelaide, Central Hove, Goldsmid, Hangleton & Knoll, North Portslade, South Portslade, Westbourne & Poets' Corner, Westdene & Hove Park (majority), and Wish; and a very small part of Regency.

The 2023 review of Westminster constituencies, which was based on the ward structure in place at 1 December 2020, left the boundaries unchanged, but the name was changed from Hove to Hove and Portslade.

The constituency covers Hove and Portslade in the city of Brighton and Hove.

== History ==
It was not until the 1950 general election, when major boundary changes occurred in Brighton, that Hove acquired a parliamentary seat of its own, having previously been in the former two-seat Brighton constituency. Hove was a Conservative stronghold until the 1997 general election, when the Labour Party saw a landslide parliamentary victory and with it, as in Greater London, wide success on the developed East Sussex coast. (Note: (Brighton Kemptown, Brighton Pavilion, Hastings and Rye also were won by candidates for New Labour)

Labour retained the seat, though with narrow majorities, at the 2001 and 2005 general elections. The Liberal Democrats including their two predecessor parties amassed their largest share of the vote in 2010 at 22.6% of the vote. Mike Weatherley, a Conservative, regained the seat at the 2010 general election. Weatherley stood down after one term, and the 2015 election saw Peter Kyle regain the seat for Labour on a 3.1% swing. The 2015 result gave the seat the 14th-smallest majority of Labour's 232 seats by percentage of majority. Kyle was reelected in 2017 by a margin of 32.6%, a 15.1% swing to Labour; this was not only the biggest margin Labour had ever won Hove by, but the largest margin any MP for Hove had won since 1987. The Conservative Party polled its lowest number of votes since 2005 and recorded their lowest percentage of the vote (31.6%) in the constituency since its creation. Turnout at the 2017 general election was 77.6%, the highest turnout in the constituency at a general election since its creation in 1950. In the 2024 election, the Greens moved into 2nd place behind Labour, the latter's vote decreasing, but managing their largest majority since they first gained the seat in 1997, and indeed being the largest majority of any seat in South East England.

== Members of Parliament ==
Brighton and Lewes prior to 1950

Election	Member	Party
1950	Anthony Marlowe	Conservative
1965 by-election	Martin Maddan	Conservative
1973 by-election	Tim Sainsbury	Conservative
1997	Ivor Caplin	Labour
2005	Celia Barlow	Labour
2010	Mike Weatherley	Conservative
2015	Peter Kyle	Labour

== Elections ==
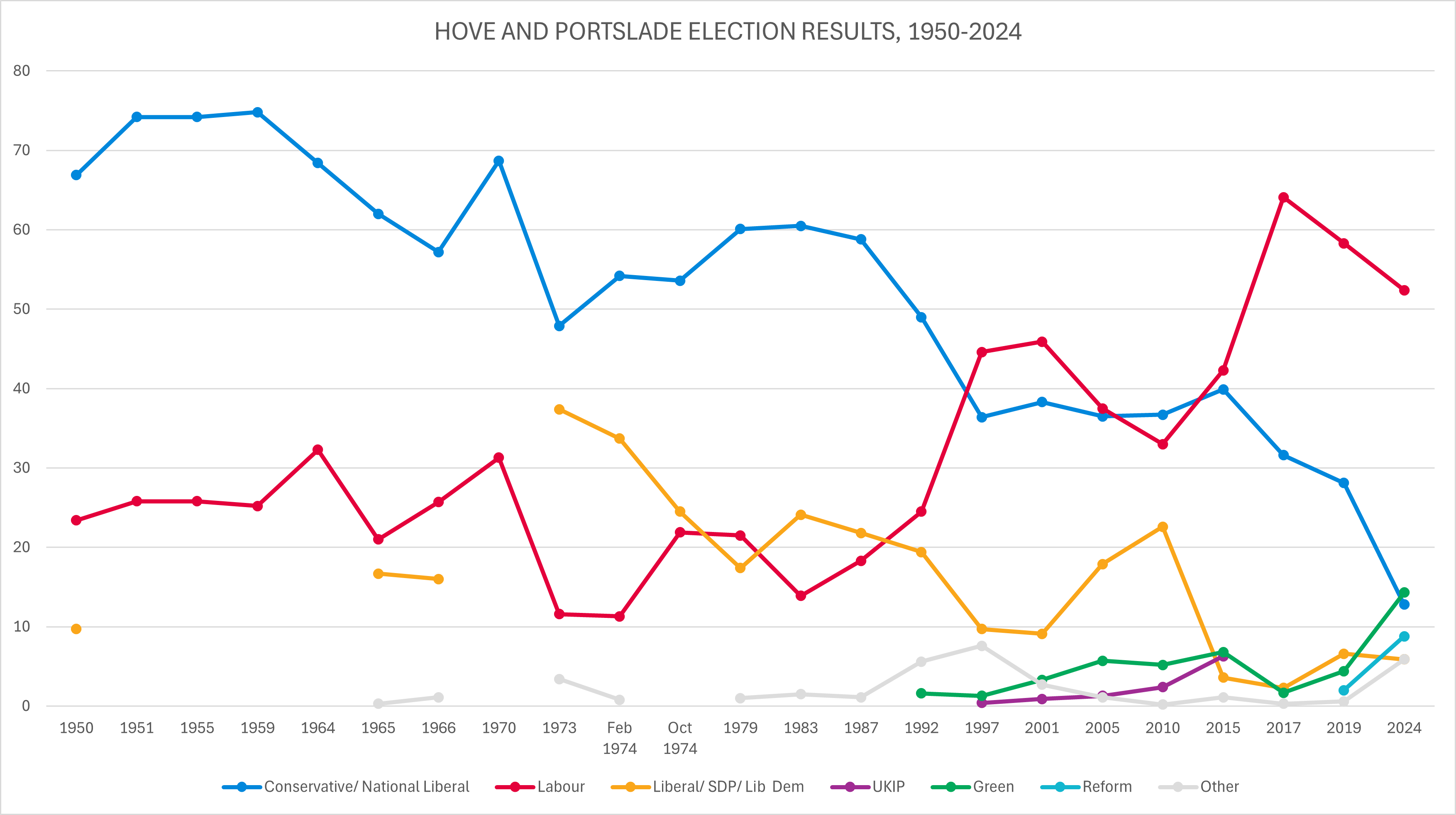
Election results 1950-2024

=== Elections in the 1950s ===
General election 1950: Hove
Party	Candidate	Votes	%	±%
Conservative	Anthony Marlowe	33,748	66.92	
Labour	Finlay R. Rea	11,791	23.38	
Liberal	John Richard Colclough	4,893	9.70	
Majority		21,957	43.54	
Turnout		50,432	81.93	
Conservative hold		Swing		

General election 1951: Hove
Party	Candidate	Votes	%	±%
Conservative	Anthony Marlowe	37,230	74.22	+7.30
Labour	Alfred D. Bermel	12,934	25.78	+2.40
Majority		24,296	48.44	
Turnout		50,164	77.40	
Conservative hold		Swing	+4.85	

General election 1955: Hove
Party	Candidate	Votes	%	±%
Conservative	Anthony Marlowe	34,314	74.15	−0.07
Labour	Harry F. Parker	11,961	25.85	+0.07
Majority		22,353	48.30	
Turnout		46,275	70.96	
Conservative hold		Swing	-0.07	

General election 1959: Hove
Party	Candidate	Votes	%	±%
Conservative	Anthony Marlowe	36,150	74.76	+0.61
Labour	Thomas James Marsh	12,206	25.24	−0.61
Majority		23,944	49.52	
Turnout		48,356	72.15	
Conservative hold		Swing	+0.61	

=== Elections in the 1960s ===
General election 1964: Hove
Party	Candidate	Votes	%	±%
Conservative	Anthony Marlowe	32,923	68.4	−6.4
Labour	Thomas James Marsh	15,214	32.3	+7.1
Majority		17,709	36.9	–12.6
Turnout		48,137	69.6	−2.5
Conservative hold		Swing	-6.4	

1965 Hove by-election
Party	Candidate	Votes	%	±%
Conservative	Martin Maddan	25,339	62.0	−6.4
Labour	Thomas James Marsh	8,387	21.0	−10.7
Liberal	Oliver Moxon	6,867	16.7	New
Independent	Max Cossman	121	0.3	New
Majority		16,952	41.0	+4.1
Turnout		40,714	58.2	−11.4
Conservative hold		Swing	+2.1	

General election 1966: Hove
Party	Candidate	Votes	%	±%
Conservative	Martin Maddan	28,799	57.2	−11.2
Labour	Trevor Williams	12,909	25.7	−6.6
Liberal	Oliver Moxon	8,037	16.0	N/A
Independent	Max Cossmann	574	1.1	N/A
Majority		15,890	31.5	−5.4
Turnout		50,319	72.1	+13.9
Conservative hold		Swing	-4.7	

=== Elections in the 1970s ===
General election 1970: Hove
Party	Candidate	Votes	%	±%
Conservative	Martin Maddan	34,287	68.7	+11.5
Labour	David G. Nicholas	15,639	31.3	+5.6
Majority		18,648	37.4	+5.9
Turnout		49,926	66.7	−5.4
Conservative hold		Swing	+8.6	

By-election 1973: Hove
Party	Candidate	Votes	%	±%
Conservative	Tim Sainsbury	22,070	47.9	−20.8
Liberal	Des Wilson	17,224	37.4	New
Labour	Ronald Wallis	5,335	11.6	−19.7
National Front	John Harrison-Broadley	1,409	3.1	New
Marxist-Leninist (England)	Carole Reakes	128	0.3	New
Majority		4,846	10.5	−26.9
Turnout		46,038		
Conservative hold		Swing	-29.2	

General election February 1974: Hove
Party	Candidate	Votes	%	±%
Conservative	Tim Sainsbury	30,451	54.2	
Liberal	Des Wilson	18,942	33.7	
Labour	R. A. Wallis	6,374	11.3	
National Front	Ted Budden	442	0.8	
Majority		11,509	20.5	
Turnout		56,209	77.4	
Conservative hold		Swing		

General election October 1974: Hove
Party	Candidate	Votes	%	±%
Conservative	Tim Sainsbury	27,345	53.6	−0.6
Liberal	James M. M. Walsh	12,469	24.5	−9.2
Labour	L. E. Hamilton	11,179	21.9	+10.6
Majority		14,876	29.1	+8.6
Turnout		50,993	69.8	−7.6
Conservative hold		Swing	+4.9	

General election 1979: Hove
Party	Candidate	Votes	%	±%
Conservative	Tim Sainsbury	30,256	60.1	+6.5
Labour	B. R. Fitch	10,807	21.5	−0.4
Liberal	James M. M. Walsh	8,771	17.4	−7.1
National Front	F. Sheridan	508	1.0	New
Majority		19,449	38.6	+9.5
Turnout		50,342	71.6	+1.8
Conservative hold		Swing	+3.5	

=== Elections in the 1980s ===
General election 1983: Hove
Party	Candidate	Votes	%	±%
Conservative	Tim Sainsbury	28,628	60.5	+0.4
Liberal	Theodora Beamish	11,409	24.1	+6.7
Labour	Chris Wright	6,550	13.9	−7.6
Spare the Earth	Thomas Layton	524	1.1	New
Modern Democratic Party	K.H. Lillie	189	0.4	New
Majority		17,219	36.4	−2.2
Turnout		47,300	65.8	−5.8
Conservative hold		Swing	-3.6	

General election 1987: Hove
Party	Candidate	Votes	%	±%
Conservative	Tim Sainsbury	28,952	58.8	−1.7
SDP	Margaret Collins	10,734	21.8	−2.3
Labour	Donald Turner	9,010	18.3	+4.4
Spare the Earth	Thomas Layton	522	1.1	0.0
Majority		18,218	37.0	+0.6
Turnout		49,218	67.8	+2.0
Conservative hold		Swing	+2.0	

=== Elections in the 1990s ===
General election 1992: Hove
Party	Candidate	Votes	%	±%
Conservative	Tim Sainsbury	24,525	49.0	−9.8
Labour	Donald Turner	12,257	24.5	+6.2
Liberal Democrats	Anne F. Jones	9,709	19.4	−2.4
Ind. Conservative	John P. Furness	2,658	5.3	New
Green	Gordon S. Sinclair	814	1.6	New
Natural Law	John H. Morilly	126	0.3	New
Majority		12,268	24.5	−12.5
Turnout		50,089	74.1	+6.3
Conservative hold		Swing	−8.0	

General election 1997: Hove
Party	Candidate	Votes	%	±%
Labour	Ivor Caplin	21,458	44.6	+20.1
Conservative	Robert Guy	17,499	36.4	−12.6
Liberal Democrats	Thomas Pearce	4,645	9.7	−9.7
Referendum	Stuart R. Field	1,931	4.0	New
Ind. Conservative	John P. Furness	1,735	3.6	−1.7
Green	Philip A.T. Mulligan	644	1.3	−0.3
UKIP	J.E. Vause	209	0.4	New
Majority		3,959	8.2	N/A
Turnout		48,121	69.6	−4.5
Labour gain from Conservative		Swing	+16.4	

=== Elections in the 2000s ===
General election 2001: Hove
Party	Candidate	Votes	%	±%
Labour	Ivor Caplin	19,253	45.9	+1.3
Conservative	Jenny M. Langston	16,082	38.3	+1.9
Liberal Democrats	Harold De Souza	3,823	9.1	−0.6
Green	Anthea P. Ballam	1,369	3.3	+2.0
Socialist Alliance	Andy K. Richards	531	1.3	New
UKIP	Richard Franklin	358	0.9	+0.5
Liberal	Nigel R. Donovan	316	0.8	New
Free Party	Simon Dobbshead	196	0.5	New
Independent	Thomas S. Major	60	0.1	New
Majority		3,171	7.6	−0.6
Turnout		41,988	58.9	−10.7
Labour hold		Swing	-0.3	

General election 2005: Hove
Party	Candidate	Votes	%	±%
Labour	Celia Barlow	16,786	37.5	−8.4
Conservative	Nick Boles	16,366	36.5	−1.8
Liberal Democrats	Paul Elgood	8,002	17.9	+8.8
Green	Anthea P. Ballam	2,575	5.7	+2.4
UKIP	Stuart N. Bower	575	1.3	+0.4
Respect	Paddy O'Keefe	268	0.6	New
Independent	Bob Dobbs	95	0.2	New
Silent Majority Party	Richard Franklin	78	0.2	New
Independent	Brian Ralfe	51	0.1	New
Majority		420	1.0	−6.6
Turnout		44,796	64.1	+5.2
Labour hold		Swing	-3.3	

=== Elections in the 2010s ===
General election 2010: Hove
Party	Candidate	Votes	%	±%
Conservative	Mike Weatherley	18,294	36.7	+0.2
Labour	Celia Barlow	16,426	33.0	−4.5
Liberal Democrats	Paul Elgood	11,240	22.6	+4.7
Green	Ian Davey	2,568	5.2	−0.5
UKIP	Paul Perrin	1,206	2.4	+1.1
Independent	Brian Ralfe	85	0.2	+0.1
Majority		1,868	3.7	N/A
Turnout		49,819	69.5	+5.4
Conservative gain from Labour		Swing	+2.4	

General election 2015: Hove
Party	Candidate	Votes	%	±%
Labour	Peter Kyle	22,082	42.3	+9.3
Conservative	Graham Cox	20,846	39.9	+3.2
Green	Christopher Hawtree	3,569	6.8	+1.6
UKIP	Kevin Smith	3,265	6.3	+3.9
Liberal Democrats	Peter Lambell	1,861	3.6	–19.0
Independent	Jenny Barnard-Langston	322	0.6	New
TUSC	Dave Hill	144	0.3	New
Monster Raving Loony	Dame Jon Dixon	125	0.2	New
Majority		1,236	2.4	N/A
Turnout		52,214	71.0	+1.5
Labour gain from Conservative		Swing	+3.1	

Peter Kyle's 21.8% vote share increase was the 5th largest for any Labour Party candidate at the 2017 election.

General election 2017: Hove
Party	Candidate	Votes	%	±%
Labour	Peter Kyle	36,942	64.1	+21.8
Conservative	Kristy Adams	18,185	31.6	–8.3
Liberal Democrats	Carrie Hynds	1,311	2.3	–1.3
Green	Phélim Mac Cafferty	971	1.7	–5.1
Independent	Charley Sabel	187	0.3	New
Majority		18,757	32.5	+30.1
Turnout		57,596	77.6	+6.6
Labour hold		Swing	+15.1	

General election 2019: Hove
Party	Candidate	Votes	%	±%
Labour	Peter Kyle	32,876	58.3	–5.8
Conservative	Robert Nemeth	15,832	28.1	–3.5
Liberal Democrats	Beatrice Bass	3,731	6.6	+4.3
Green	Oliver Sykes	2,496	4.4	+2.7
Brexit Party	Angela Hancock	1,111	2.0	New
Monster Raving Loony	Dame Dixon	195	0.3	New
Independent	Charlotte Sabel	150	0.3	0.0
Majority		17,044	30.2	–2.3
Turnout		56,391	75.9	–1.7
Labour hold		Swing	–1.2	

=== Elections in the 2020s ===
General election 2024: Hove and Portslade
Party	Candidate	Votes	%	±%
Labour	Peter Kyle	27,209	52.4	−5.9
Green	Sophie Broadbent	7,418	14.3	+9.9
Conservative	Carline Deal	6,630	12.8	−15.3
Reform	Martin Hess	4,558	8.8	+6.8
Independent	Tanushka Marah	3,048	5.9	N/A
Liberal Democrats	Michael Wang	3,046	5.9	−0.7
Majority		19,881	38.1	▲7.9
Turnout		51,909	70.1	▼5.8
Registered electors		74,063		
Labour hold		Swing	▼7.9	

== See also ==
- parliamentary constituencies in East Sussex
- List of parliamentary constituencies in the South East England (region)

== Sources ==
- Election result, 2005 (BBC)
- Election results, 1997 – 2001 (BBC)
- Election results, 1997 – 2001 (Election Demon)
- Election results, 1983 – 1992 (Election Demon)
- Election results, 1992 – 2005 (Guardian)
- Election results, 1951 – 2001 (Keele University)
- F. W. S. Craig. British Parliamentary Election Results 1950–1973. (ISBN 0-900178-07-8)
