= Norway-plus model =

Proposal for a post-Brexit settlement

In British politics, the "Norway-plus model" was a proposal for a post-Brexit settlement, which the British government did not pursue. Proposed in November 2018 as an alternative to the Chequers plan, it would have consisted of membership of the European Free Trade Association (EFTA) and of membership of the European Economic Area (EEA) as an EFTA member state, combined with a separate customs union with the EU to create a trade relationship similar to that between the EU and its member states today, with the exception of the political representation in the EU's bodies. Michel Barnier, the EU's Chief Negotiator, has always said that a model that combined EEA/EFTA and a customs union was one that he would be happy to consider.

One of the main proponents of the plan is the former Conservative backbench MP Nick Boles. The description "Norway-plus" refers to Norway's relationship with the European Union (and that of the other smaller EFTA–EEA members, Iceland and Liechtenstein), with "plus" referring to the addition of a customs union outside of EFTA.

Membership of EFTA and the EEA has also been discussed in the context of Scottish independence; Christophe Hillion, Professor of European Law at the University of Oslo, said that while there was scepticism about UK accession in Norway, Scotland was viewed much more positively, and that the EFTA member states would likely welcome an independent Scotland as a member.

== Norway's relationship with the EU ==
Norway, along with Liechtenstein and Iceland, are members of the European Free Trade Association (EFTA) and the European Economic Area (EEA) which comprises the member states of the European Union in addition to these three EFTA member states. Additionally Switzerland is a member state of EFTA but not part of the EEA, having rejected ratification of the EEA Agreement. EFTA was founded in 1960 and is one of the two historically dominant western European trade blocs, but is now much smaller and intimately associated and integrated with its historical competitor, the European Union. Of the founding members of EFTA only Norway and Switzerland remain. All the four EFTA member states are part of the European Single Market (also known as the Common Market) which guarantees the free movement of goods, capital, services, and labour, either through the EEA Agreement, or in Switzerland's case, through special bilateral treaties. All EFTA member states are also part of the Schengen Area which has abolished passport and all other types of border control at their mutual borders.

The EFTA member states are often regarded as de facto EU members, but without political representation; as an example of their status as "equivalent" to EU citizens, Norwegian citizens are entitled to use the EU passport queues throughout the EU and generally enjoy all the same rights as EU citizens. Specifically, EFTA citizens and EU citizens have freedom of movement rights to travel, work and settle in any member state of either.

Political scientist Simon Usherwood notes that

Norway – even more than the United Kingdom – is the country that has had the most comprehensive review of its relationship with the EU. Among assorted commissions, reports and parliamentary enquiries, the country has explored both the impact and politics of its participation in the EEA. The short version of all of this has been a recognition that Norway is a member state [of the EU] in all but name.

British Labour MP Peter Kyle stated that "Norway shadows the ECJ, it pays more fees into EU countries as part of its settlement per capita than Britain currently does for full membership, and Norway is very honest about the downside of taking rules whilst having little influence over their making."

Norway was one of the first Outer Seven countries to be invited to join the European Union's predecessors. As such Norway had debate on joining the European Communities since their establishment in the 1950s. However, due to Charles de Gaulle's opposition to invite the United Kingdom no new member state was invited until the 1970s. After Charles de Gaulle left office in 1969 an enlargement then became possible, and Norway, along with the United Kingdom, Ireland and Denmark, were the countries invited to join in the first enlargement of the European Communities in the early 1970s. However Norway declined the invitation to join following a consultative referendum in 1972 and declined again in 1994. Each time the Norwegian government, parliamentary majorities, business leaders, the civil service and other elites were strongly in favour of joining, but the proposals to join were narrowly defeated in consultative referendums. In Norway the main pro-EU parties have consistently been the Labour Party and even more so the Conservative Party, the country's two largest parties, while the main opponents traditionally have been the radical left and rural–agrarian interests, e.g. those in the fisheries industry, which also tend to oppose the dominance of their own country's capital.

Norway's current arrangement with the European Union came into existence following several years of negotiations, and is widely viewed as a substitute for full EU membership. Former Prime Minister Jens Stoltenberg said the EEA Agreement gives Norway less influence and that he would strongly prefer full EU membership; Stoltenberg said "there is no real dialogue or cooperation", and mentioned as an example a meeting between the finance ministers of EFTA and the EU where only the finance ministers of Norway's close neighbour Sweden and of Ireland, which held the EU presidency, bothered showing up. Stoltenberg further said the only good thing about EFTA is that Norway is a superpower within the international organisation.

== Requirements for the United Kingdom to join EFTA and EEA ==
The EEA Agreement specifies that membership is open to member states of either the European Union or the European Free Trade Association (EFTA). As an EU member, the United Kingdom was part of the European Economic Area. After leaving the EU and thus the EEA, the only way of rejoining the European Economic Area would be by applying to join EFTA (or rejoining the EU). However, if the United Kingdom were to re-join EFTA, it would not automatically become party to the EEA Agreement, as each EFTA State decides on its own whether it applies to be party to the EEA Agreement or not. According to Article 128 of the EEA Agreement, “any European State becoming a member of the Community shall, and the Swiss Confederation or any European State becoming a member of EFTA may, apply to become a party to this Agreement. It shall address its application to the EEA Council.” EFTA does not envisage political integration. It does not issue legislation, nor does it establish a customs union. Schengen is not a part of the EEA Agreement. However, all of the four EFTA States participate in Schengen and Dublin through bilateral agreements. They all apply the provisions of the relevant Acquis.

Under the Norway-plus plan, the UK would have applied to join EFTA and the EFTA pillar of the EEA, without leaving the EEA. As an EFTA and EEA member, the United Kingdom would have been required to respect the free movement of persons within the EEA, as that is one of the core rights of the EEA.

Joining EFTA would require all the four EFTA member states' consent in accordance with the EFTA Convention. If the EFTA member states admitted the United Kingdom, the United Kingdom would subsequently be able to apply to become party to the EEA Agreement, and its application would need the approval of the current parties to the EEA Agreement, made up of EU and EFTA member states. No country has joined either without several years of preceding and complex negotiations.

== Obstacles to the proposal ==
=== Norwegian opinion on the UK re-joining EFTA ===
Norway represents 94% of the population of the EFTA–EEA countries and is one of the two dominant EFTA member states along with Switzerland. Some Norwegian politicians have ruled out admitting the UK into EFTA and its EFTA–EEA arrangement, as contrary to the interests of Norway, which favours a close relationship with the EU and close European integration. Norway has never vetoed any EU legislation. UK accession would require the consent of the Norwegian Parliament.

Norwegian Conservative Party MP Heidi Nordby Lunde, President of the European Movement Norway, who said her view reflected those of her governing party, said: "The Norwegian option is not an option. We have been telling you this for one and a half years since the referendum and how this works, so I am surprised that after all these years it is still part of the grown-up debate in the UK. You just expect us to give you an invitation rather than consider whether Norway would want to give you such an invitation."

Explaining why Norway would not be interested in inviting the UK into EFTA, Lunde said that "I think you would mess it all up for us, the way you have messed it all up for yourselves." In an op-ed in The Guardian Lunde wrote that "Norway’s arrangement with the EU works for us because we respect its laws and freedoms – not like Brexiters" and that "the UK seems to be considering joining our EFTA family as a temporary solution – Norway for now – until it gets a better deal. It really surprises me that anyone would think Norwegians would find that appealing."

Another Conservative politician, the then-Prime Minister Erna Solberg, was quoted in the Financial Times 14/05/2018 saying: "I think we will cope very well if the Brits come in. It will give bargaining power on our side too. And it would ease Norway’s access to the UK."

Labour MP Anniken Huitfeldt, the chair of the Standing Committee on Foreign Affairs and Defence, said that "Norwegian interests are quite different from British interests" and that "I do not see the need to extend an invitation for Britain to join EFTA."

The Labour Party Chief Whip Kari Henriksen said that British membership of EFTA "would not be good for our country" and that "Britain is looking to put their own interests first."

Then-Vice President of the Norwegian Parliament, later cabinet minister Abid Raja, who represents the Liberal Party that is part of the government coalition, said that "Norway must think of its own interests and what is best there is that Britain holds a new referendum and stays in the EU."

However, EFTA officially stated "If the UK were to seek to re-join EFTA, EFTA Member States would carefully examine the application. A request for membership of EFTA would be considered by the EFTA Council, where decisions are taken by consensus. It is not timely to prejudge what the outcome would be as EFTA remains open to examining all options to safeguard the interests of its Member States."

=== Incompatibility of EFTA membership and third-party customs union ===
The mainstream opinion of legal scholars of European law in the EFTA countries is that it is not possible for an EFTA member state to be in a customs union with non-EFTA countries, because EFTA is itself a trade association outside of the EU's customs union. As an EFTA member the UK would therefore not be able to enter into a separate customs union with the EU, rendering a proposal to join both EFTA and a customs union with the EU (the "plus" part of the proposal) impossible under the EFTA Convention.

== Further debate in the United Kingdom ==
Other options that have been discussed include "Canada-plus", modeled on the Comprehensive Economic and Trade Agreement between the EU and Canada.

In December 2018, a substantial number of UK cabinet ministers (in the second May ministry) were reported to be in favour of seeking a Norway-plus option.

The Work and Pensions Secretary Amber Rudd stated that she saw the Norway-plus option as a plausible alternative to the Chequers plan.

=== Scottish membership of EFTA and the EEA ===
Membership of EFTA and the EEA has also been discussed in the context of Scottish independence. Following the British decision to leave the European Union in 2016, the Scottish Government and Parliament decided to seek independence for Scotland. Membership of EFTA and the EEA is one of the options explored by Scottish authorities in the event of Scottish independence. There has been no significant objection to the possibility of Scottish membership in the EFTA member states, but Iceland pointed out that Scotland could only apply for EFTA membership if it were to become an independent country.

Scotland shares particularly close historical and cultural ties with Norway, and is generally viewed more favourably in Norway than the United Kingdom as a whole. Scotland is also the same size as Norway. Scotland's position in the United Kingdom is also often compared to Norway's position in the historic kingdom of Denmark–Norway, and many Norwegians are sympathetic to Scotland's independence movement. Scotland's political culture is also considered to be much closer to Norway and aligned with Norwegian values. Christophe Hillion, Professor of European Law at the University of Oslo, said EFTA and the EFTA–EEA group were likely to welcome an independent Scotland as a member, noting that

There is some level of scepticism about UK accession to the EEA as it would basically rock the boat and make the EEA quite dysfunctional at the expense of the three smaller EFTA states. It could be very different in the case of Scotland – not simply because Scotland is a smaller country – but because a majority in Scotland voted Remain and thus to be part of the single market. So the general attitude and circumstances are different between where the UK is coming from and where Scotland is coming from.

== See also ==
- Norway–European Union relations
- Norway–United Kingdom relations
