= Oliver Moxon =

Oliver Moxon

Oliver Charles Napier Moxon (June 1922 –1989), was a British author and Liberal Party politician.

== Background ==
He was brother of actor Timothy Moxon. He was educated at Gresham's School, Holt.

== Professional career ==
Moxon was variously an author/publisher, hotel proprietor and company director. During the Second World War he served as an RAF Officer. After the war, with his brother Timothy, he founded the New Torch Theatre in London. He founded the publishing company Book Express Ltd. He wrote Bitter Monsoon-The Memoirs of a Fighter Pilot (1955), a novel based on the memoirs of a fighter pilot during operations in Burma during World War II. He followed this up with The Last Monsoon (1957) and After the Monsoon (1958). He owned a restaurant on the North Coast of Jamaica.

== Political career ==
In 1958 he was adopted as prospective Liberal candidate for Chelsea. However, he did not contest the 1959 General Election. He was Liberal candidate unsuccessfully at three parliamentary elections.

=== Electoral record ===
1965 Hove by-election
Party	Candidate	Votes	%	±%
Conservative	William Francis Martin Maddan	25,339	62.0	−6.4
Labour	Thomas James Marsh	8,387	21.0	−10.6
Liberal	Oliver Charles Napier Moxon	6,867	16.7	N/A
Independent	Max Cossman	121	0.3	N/A
Majority		16,952	41.0	+4.2
Turnout		40,714	58.2	−11.4
Conservative hold		Swing	+2.1	

General Election 1966: Hove
Party	Candidate	Votes	%	±%
Conservative	William Francis Martin Maddan	28,799	57.2	−4.8
Labour	Trevor Williams	12,909	25.7	+4.7
Liberal	Oliver Charles Napier Moxon	8,037	16.0	−0.7
Independent	Max Cossmann	574	1.1	+0.8
Majority		15,890	31.6	−9.5
Turnout		50,319	72.1	+13.9
Conservative hold		Swing	-4.7	

General Election 1970: Brighton, Kemptown
Party	Candidate	Votes	%	±%
Conservative	Andrew Bowden	24,208	49.3	
Labour	Dennis Harry Hobden	21,105	42.9	
Liberal	Oliver Charles Napier Moxon	3,833	7.8	
Majority		3,103	6.3	
Turnout		49,146	75.0	
Conservative gain from Labour		Swing		
