= Celia Barlow =

British Labour Party politician

Member of Parliament for Hove
- In office 5 May 2005 – 12 April 2010
- Preceded by: Ivor Caplin
- Succeeded by: Mike Weatherley

Personal details
- Born: Celia Anne Barlow; 28 September 1955 (age 70) Cardiff, Wales
- Party: Labour
- Spouse: Sam Jaffa
- Children: two sons, one daughter
- Education: Cambridge University, Cardiff University
- Profession: journalist

Celia Anne Barlow (born 28 September 1955) is a British Labour Party politician who was the Member of Parliament (MP) for Hove from 2005 to 2010. She also worked as home news editor at the BBC.

== Early life ==
Barlow was born in Cardiff, Wales, and attended King Edward High School for Girls in Birmingham. She read Archaeology and Anthropology at New Hall, Cambridge, then studied for a postgraduate diploma in journalism at Cardiff University. She began her career as a reporter on the Bradford Telegraph and Argus in 1979. She was appointed assistant editor at Asia Television in Hong Kong in 1982. She returned to Britain in 1983 to become home news editor at the BBC. She left the BBC in 1995. She became a freelance video producer in 1998 before lecturing in video production at the Chichester College of Art and Design from 2000.

== Parliamentary career ==
She was elected secretary of the Chelsea Constituency Labour Party in 1993, and became the chairman of the Chichester Constituency Labour Party in 1998. In 2000, she was selected to contest the safe Conservative seat of Chichester at the 2001 General Election and finished third, behind the winner Andrew Tyrie.

In November 2004 Ivor Caplin, the Labour MP for the very marginal Hove constituency, announced his retirement at the next election and Celia Barlow was chosen to fight the seat through a controversial All-Women Shortlist. Barlow had not supported the 2003 invasion of Iraq, as opposed to Caplin who was a prominent supporter causing him difficulties in the constituency. It was widely assumed that she would be defeated by Nicholas Boles, considered a rising star of the Conservative Party, but she was elected at the 2005 General Election with a majority of just 420 votes. She became the first of the new MPs elected in 2005 to make their maiden speech in the House of Commons.

Barlow was a member of the Procedure Committee and previously served on the Environmental Audit Select Committee.

After May 2006 she served as the Parliamentary Private Secretary to Ian Pearson, Economic Secretary in HM Treasury and Parliamentary Under-Secretary in the Department for Business, Enterprise and Regulatory Reform. She is a member of parliamentary group EURIM.

Barlow was defeated at the 2010 General Election by Conservative candidate Mike Weatherley.

== 2009 Parliamentary expenses scandal ==
She was one of many UK MPs to be implicated in the 2009 Expenses Scandal, claiming more than £28,000 in expenses on her second home, then 'flipping' it and using it as her main residence. The expense claims included the cost of a whirlpool bath and a high lustre silver shower screen Barlow later made political capital out of the fact she failed to claim for a second home in London.

She was also forced to repay £635 for a mortgage valuation on her main home; a breach of the expenses rules. She later offered to apologise for her expense claims.

== Personal life ==
Barlow married the former BBC North America foreign correspondent and University of Hull-educated Sam Jaffa in August 1988 in Bromsgrove. Her husband stood for the Eastleigh seat in 2001 as a Labour candidate coming third. They have two sons and one daughter together. They divorced in 2011.

Parliament of the United Kingdom
Preceded by Ivor Caplin	Member of Parliament for Hove; 2005 – 2010	Succeeded by Mike Weatherley
