= Mike Weatherley =

British politician (1957–2021)

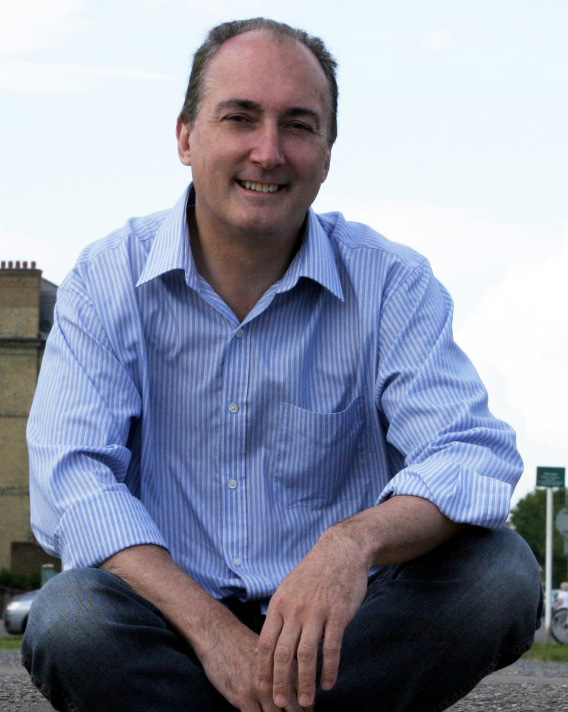
- Weatherley in 2010

Member of Parliament for Hove
- In office 6 May 2010 – 30 March 2015
- Preceded by: Celia Barlow
- Succeeded by: Peter Kyle

Personal details
- Born: 2 July 1957 Clevedon, Somerset, England
- Died: 20 May 2021 (aged 63)
- Party: Conservative
- Spouse(s): Anne Hyslop; Adriana Alves
- Children: 3
- Education: London South Bank University

Michael Richard Weatherley (2 July 1957 – 20 May 2021) was a British Conservative Party politician who was the Member of Parliament (MP) for Hove in East Sussex from 2010 to 2015.

== Early life ==
Weatherley was born in Clevedon, Somerset, on 2 July 1957, the son of Derrick and Kirsten Weatherley. He was educated at Aiglon College in Switzerland and Kent College, a private school near Canterbury, Kent, and read business studies at London South Bank University. In 1988, he became a Fellow of the Chartered Institute of Management Accountants. From 2000 to 2005, he was finance director of record producer Pete Waterman's group of businesses. In 2007, Weatherley became vice-president (Europe) of Motion Picture Licensing Corporation; in 2019, he became its vice-chairman and CEO.

== Political career ==
Weatherley's first parliamentary candidacy was at the 2001 general election in the safe Labour seat of Barking in east London; he increased the Conservative vote share, but came a distant second. Two years later, in 2003, he unsuccessfully stood for the council seat of Hollingbury and Stanmer in Brighton and Hove. At the next Westminster election, held in 2005, he was the Conservative parliamentary candidate for Brighton, Pavilion, the seat adjacent to Hove. In the event, the seat was held by the incumbent Labour MP, David Lepper, with a majority of over 5,000, and the Conservative vote share declined.

In 2006, Weatherley secured a seat on his local Crawley Borough Council, winning the Conservative-held ward of Furnace Green, and defeating the Labour candidate, 2005 Big Brother contestant Eugene Sully. Weatherley remained a councillor until the following year.

2006 also saw Weatherley selected by the Hove Conservative Association as its candidate for the next election. He was finally successful in entering parliament at the 2010 general election, in which he defeated the sitting Labour MP Celia Barlow with a majority of 1,868.

=== In Parliament ===
Following his election, Weatherley campaigned to have squatting in residential properties criminalised, with the backing of Justice Minister Kenneth Clarke. The campaign was successful and led to a provision in the Legal Aid, Sentencing and Punishment of Offenders Act 2012, creating a new offence. In November 2012, he was attacked with vegetables by a group of pro-squatting protesters ahead of a debate on the legislation at the University of Sussex. Weatherley and his staff were eventually led to safety by police. Weatherley rejected claims in March 2013 that, as originator of the legislation, he was responsible for a homeless man freezing to death while sleeping outside an empty bungalow.

Weatherley had an interest in protecting intellectual property rights, and was a member of the All Party Parliamentary Intellectual Property Group, one of the main objectives of which is to highlight intellectual property rights. The campaign gained support from musicians such as Alice Cooper. In April 2014, Weatherley called on then-prime minister David Cameron to commit to the permanent funding of the Police Intellectual Property Crime Unit to extend its existence beyond 2015.

Weatherley campaigned against the repeal of the Hunting Act 2004, stating that "hunting foxes with hounds is a cruel and inhumane practice," and pledging to vote against any measure which would lead to the ban being overturned. He also campaigned against the implementation of the proposed ban on the retail display of tobacco products, arguing that it would damage trade for small businesses. Weatherley wrote to David Cameron in favour of same-sex couples gaining equal marriage rights, also advocating that religious organisations should be forced to register such ceremonies, which caused controversy.

Weatherley was the chair of the All-Party Parliamentary Group (APPG) on Business and Retail Crime, along with various other APPGs. He was also a vice-president of the Debating Group, and a supporter of the Free Enterprise Group.

After suffering from cancer of the oesophagus, Weatherley stood down at the 2015 general election.

== Personal life ==
Weatherley had two sons and a daughter with his first wife, Anne Hyslop. In February 2010, he separated from his second wife, Brazilian-born Adriana Alves.

Outside politics, one of his recreations was rock and heavy metal music. In his spare time, he watched bands perform live in local venues and, in his maiden speech, he pledged that he would wear an Iron Maiden T-shirt in the chamber of the House of Commons. On 15 December 2011, Weatherley announced that he was unable to fulfill his pledge, explaining, "It's not allowed in the Commons, I asked the Speaker if he'd give me permission and he said no."

Weatherley was a keen cyclist, having participated in the London to Brighton bike ride and, along with 44 other cyclists, raised £230,000 for Childline and Nordoff Robbins by participating in a 100-mile charity bike ride along the Nile in Egypt. He was also a qualified ski instructor and football referee, and played centre-forward for the Martha Gunners. In Who's Who, he also listed motorbikes as a recreation.

Michael Weatherley died of lung cancer on 20 May 2021, at age 63.

Parliament of the United Kingdom
Preceded by Celia Barlow	Member of Parliament for Hove; 2010–2015	Succeeded by Peter Kyle
