= Felpham Community College =

Location
- Felpham Way; Felpham, West Sussex, PO22 8EL; England; 50.7935°N 0.6567°W

Information
- Type: Community school
- Motto: 'Achievement – Care – Equality'
- Established: 1974
- Founder: Brian Swanton
- Local authority: West Sussex County Council
- Department for Education URN: 126080 Tables
- Ofsted: Reports
- Head teacher: Suzanne Pike
- Staff: 108 (Not including cleaning or grounds keeping staff)
- Gender: Mixed
- Age: 11 to 18
- Enrollment: 1,595
- Houses: KS3/4: F, E, L, P, H, A, M, C, O, G. KS5: AWE, CMC, DCH, DMG, GSL, SAY, SBU. (One complete set per year e.g. 7M-11M, 12SAY-13SAY.)
- Colour: Purple Blue Black
- Website: http://www.felpham.com/

Felpham Community College is a maintained comprehensive secondary school for pupils aged 11 to 18. It caters to approximately 1400 pupils in Years to 13, nearly 200 in its sixth form.

== History ==
Until the 1970s, students from primary schools in the village of Felpham attended secondary schools in the nearby town of Bognor Regis. A secondary school was opened in Felpham in 1974/5 as Felpham Comprehensive School. In 1978 it accommodated around 800 pupils and in 1980 the initial intake of pupils had reached the sixth form. The neighbouring Arun Leisure Centre was also completed at this time with the School sharing its sports facilities. The school was renamed as Felpham Community College in c.1991 by which time pupil number had risen to around 1300. It currently has the capacity for 1743 pupils.

== Campus ==
The college is sited on a campus which it shares with the local leisure centre (Arun Leisure Centre). The school uses the Arun Leisure Centre in PE and Year 7 swimming lessons.

The school has two main buildings, which are divided into "blocks" on school timetables and maps. These are:

- North (denoted by an N before the room number, and housing the English and Maths departments).
- South (denoted by an S before the room number, and housing the History and Geography departments).
- Vocational (denoted by a V before the room number; originally used for vocational studies, most classrooms in this block are now occupied by the Social Science departments.
- Labs (denoted by an L before the room number, and housing the Science department).
- Art (denoted by a D before the room number, and housing the Art and Photography department).
- Blake (the newest part of the school, having only been opened in 2020, it is denoted by a B before the room number, and houses the Technology, Music, Drama, IT, Modern Foreign Languages and Business departments).

== Notable former pupils ==
- Danny Hollands, footballer
- Peter Kyle, Labour MP and Secretary of State for Science, Innovation and Technology
- Ben Richards, actor, best known for his role in ITV's Footballer's Wives
