= Nick Boles =

British politician (born 1965)

Nicholas Boles
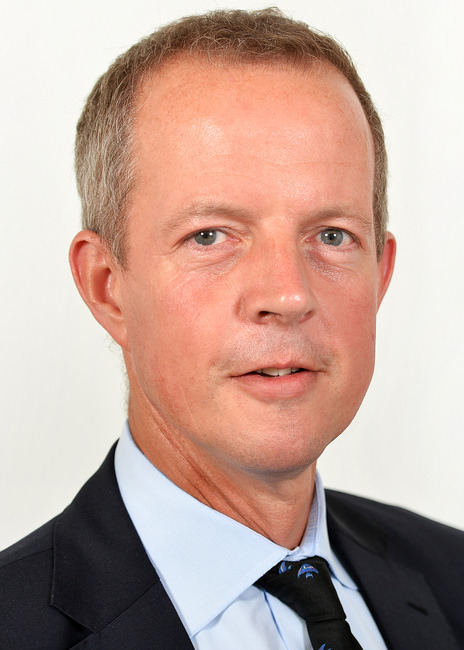
- Official portrait, c. 2014–16

Minister of State for Skills
- In office 14 July 2014 – 13 July 2016
- Prime Minister: David Cameron
- Preceded by: Matt Hancock
- Succeeded by: Robert Halfon

Parliamentary Under-Secretary of State for Decentralisation
- In office 5 September 2012 – 14 July 2014
- Prime Minister: David Cameron
- Preceded by: Greg Clark
- Succeeded by: Penny Mordaunt

Member of Parliament for Grantham and Stamford
- In office 6 May 2010 – 6 November 2019
- Preceded by: Quentin Davies
- Succeeded by: Gareth Davies

Personal details
- Born: Nicholas Edward Coleridge Boles; 2 November 1965 (age 60) Henham, Essex, England
- Party: Labour (2022–)
- Other political affiliations: Conservative (until 2019)
- Education: Winchester College, Hampshire (Private boarding school)
- Alma mater: University of Oxford (BA); Harvard University (MPP)
- Website: www.nickboles.co.uk

Nicholas Edward Coleridge Boles (born 2 November 1965) is a British politician who was the Member of Parliament (MP) for Grantham and Stamford from 2010 to 2019. He was a member of the Conservative Party until 2019.

Before entering parliament, Boles was a Westminster City councillor and the director of Policy Exchange, a think tank based in Westminster. He was elected to the Grantham and Stamford constituency in Lincolnshire at the 2010 general election. He served as Minister of State for Skills from 2014 to 2016.

Boles resigned from his local Conservative Association on 16 March 2019 citing differences with his local party. On 1 April 2019, he resigned the party whip, accusing the party of failing to compromise on Brexit. He then sat as an Independent Progressive Conservative until the dissolution of parliament on 5 November.

== Early life and education ==
Boles was born on 2 November 1965, the son of Sir Jack Boles, who was later Director-General of the National Trust from 1975 to 1983. He is the great-nephew of Conservative MP Dennis Boles.

Boles was privately educated at Winchester College before studying philosophy, politics and economics (PPE) at the University of Oxford where he was an undergraduate student at Magdalen College, Oxford. He then was awarded a Kennedy Scholarship to study for a master's in public policy at the Harvard Kennedy School.

== Career ==
In 1995, Boles founded a small DIY supply business, Longwall Holdings Limited, of which he is the non-executive chairman, having served as its chief executive until 2000. In 1998, he was elected as a Conservative councillor for the West End ward on Westminster City Council. He was chairman of the council's housing committee from 1999 to 2001, before stepping down in 2002.

Boles was considered one of a group of young Conservatives, aligned with David Cameron and George Osborne, described as the Notting Hill set. He founded the think tank Policy Exchange in 2002, and served as its director until leaving the organisation in 2007.

Boles was the Conservative Party candidate for the Labour-held marginal seat of Hove for the 2005 general election. He shunned help from the local mainly older Conservative members and instead relied on younger people from London who had little rapport with the local electorate. He received media attention during the election by being an openly gay Conservative candidate for a winnable seat. However, Celia Barlow retained the seat for Labour. He was a candidate in the Conservative primary for the 2008 London mayoral election, but withdrew after being diagnosed with Hodgkin's lymphoma.

Boles recovered from his illness, and in October 2007, was selected as the prospective Conservative candidate for Grantham and Stamford, then occupied by Quentin Davies, who had switched allegiance from the Conservatives to Labour earlier in 2007. In May 2008, Boles was appointed as the Chief of Staff for the new Conservative Mayor of London Boris Johnson for three months. In the second half of 2008, he worked on preparing the Conservatives for government by meeting senior civil servants to discuss how to implement Conservative policies if they won the next general election.

Boles was elected as member for Grantham and Stamford in May 2010 with a majority of 14,826. He was appointed as Parliamentary Private Secretary to the Schools Minister Nick Gibb in 2010.

Boles was Minister for Planning between November 2012 and August 2014. He introduced a "presumption for sustainable development" aimed at making new housing development easier, which required councils to create local plans identifying areas that were suitable for further building. In a November 2013 speech, at a conference fringe meeting, he argued that, despite their unpopularity, the reforms were "making the world a slightly better place", but that he'd prefer to work in education than planning. In August 2014, Boles was appointed Minister for Skills, which included responsibilities for education and construction.

In October 2016, Boles announced that a cancerous tumour had been found in his head and he expected to undergo treatment soon. The following February, he took a trip out of hospital after a third round of chemotherapy in order to vote for the government's bill on withdrawal from the European Union. He announced in April 2017 he would be standing at the 2017 general election. The tumour was eradicated by chemotherapy.

=== 2019 resignation ===
On 16 March 2019, Boles resigned from his local Conservative Association after disagreeing with them about his rejection of leaving the EU with no deal. The local association had been considering deselecting him as candidate at the next election, due to the disagreement.

On 1 April 2019, Boles resigned from the Conservative Party following the announcement of the results of the second round of indicative votes on exiting the European Union. He had been a proponent with Oliver Letwin of the "Common Market 2.0" proposal, which failed at 261 - 282 votes, and reportedly felt "furious", "upset" and "let down" by fellow MPs who had promised to vote in support of his proposal, and at party whips who had attempted to persuade MPs to abstain on the proposal, despite declaring it to be a free vote. He stated in his resignation speech that:

"I have given everything to an attempt to find a compromise that can take this country out of the European Union while maintaining our economic strength and political cohesion. I accept that I have failed. I have failed chiefly because my party refuses to compromise. I regret, therefore, that I can no longer sit for this party."

He subsequently described himself as sitting as an "Independent Progressive Conservative" until parliament was dissolved on 6 November 2019.

=== Policy positions ===
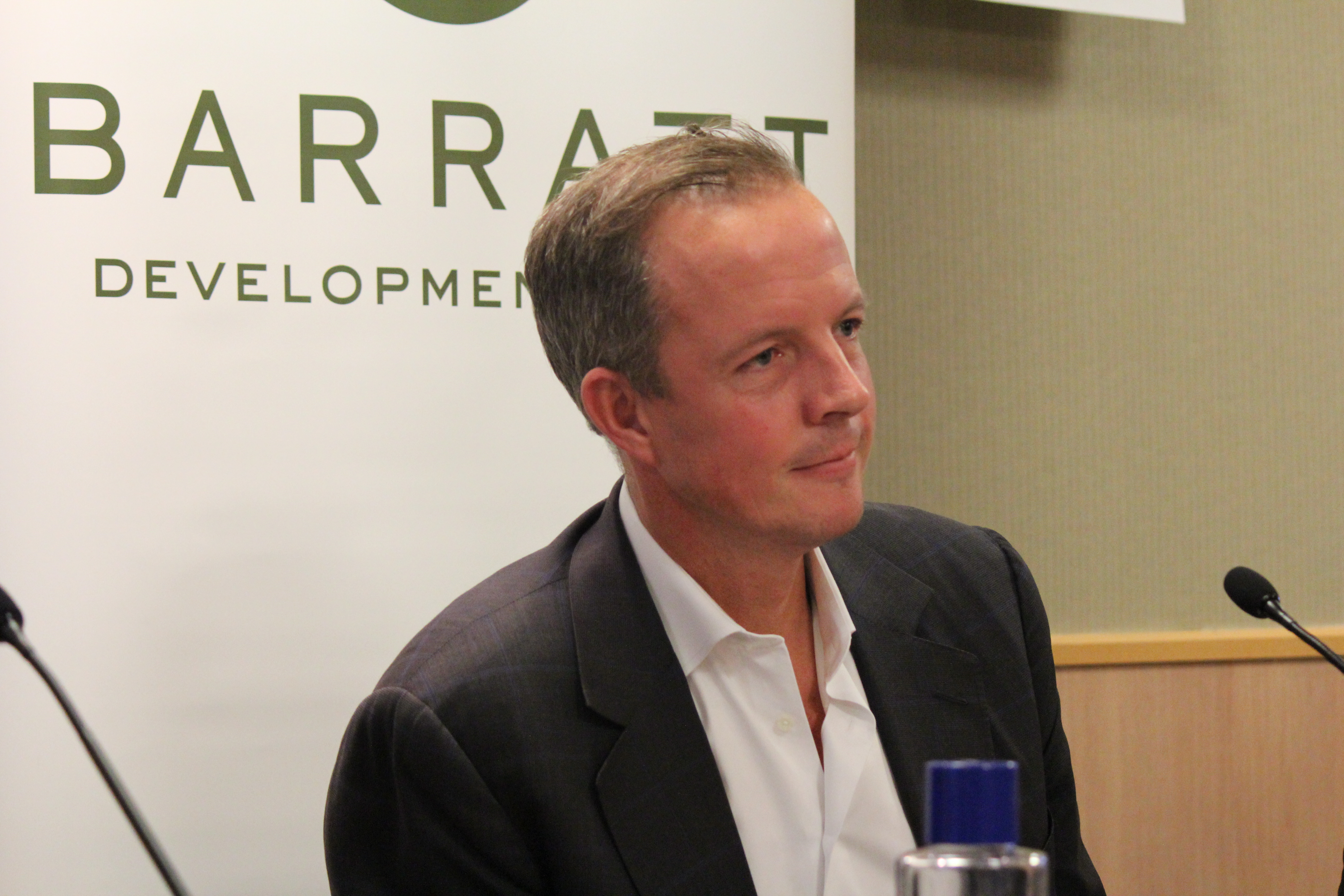
Boles speaking in 2013

In 2010, Boles argued that the coalition government was the true inheritor of Blairism, and called for former Labour Cabinet ministers—David Miliband, James Purnell and Andrew Adonis—to join the government. This echoed a similar call from his close friend, Michael Gove, for Purnell, Adonis and Hazel Blears to serve a Conservative government. Later that year, Boles also called for the coalition to remain until after 2015 in the form of an electoral pact. Boles has called for the forming of a "national liberal" faction within the Conservative Party, formed of social liberals with fiscally conservative views, and suggested some Conservative candidates might benefit from running for election under that name to win over voters who did not consider themselves conservatives.

In July 2012, Boles used a speech at the Resolution Foundation think tank to call for:

- An end to winter fuel payments, free prescriptions, free bus travel and free TV licences for better-off pensioners;
- A postponement of deciding on full implementation of Andrew Dilnot's solution to the future funding of social care until the next comprehensive spending review;
- A cut of £10.5 billion from welfare bills by 2016–17 and devising a better solution to support parenting of young children than the Sure Start programme which he describes as "demonstrably ineffective".

As a minister, Boles was reported to have been on the political council of the Henry Jackson Society, a think tank which advocates an interventionist approach to foreign policy, in December 2016. In 2012, he was listed as a participant in that year's Bilderberg Group meeting.

Boles supported the Remain campaign in the European Union membership referendum in 2016. After the referendum vote to leave the EU, he favoured a Norway-style relationship between the UK and the EU after Brexit, and strongly opposed a no-deal Brexit. Boles said in December 2018: "If at any point between now and 29 March [2019] the government were to announce that 'no deal' Brexit had become its policy, I would immediately resign the Conservative whip and vote in any way necessary to stop it from happening."

Boles supports Land Value Tax. While an MP Boles, who had suffered a life-threatening illness before supporting the campaign, in 2018 became the chairman of the All-Party Parliamentary Group for Choice at the End of Life, which believes that terminally ill patients should have the right to an assisted death.

=== After parliament ===
Boles did not stand as a candidate in the 12 December 2019 election. He endorsed the Liberal Democrats in the 2019 election, but then revealed that he had in fact voted for the Greens. During the 2022 local elections, he announced that he would be voting Labour, and said that he had also done so in 1997. Boles had previously stated that he flirted with joining the Labour Party under Blair, but said he wanted to be on the liberal wing of a party instead of the hard-nosed, right-wing of a party. In September 2022, Boles wrote an article in The Guardian, criticising Liz Truss's government and saying that "Labour is the only party that can lead us out of this mess".

Boles is a senior adviser at FMA, or Francis Maude Associates, a consulting firm founded by Francis Maude and Simone Finn in 2016.

== Personal life ==
Boles is gay, and entered a civil partnership in May 2011. Boles's sister, Victoria Boles, married Dudley Fishburn, a former Member of Parliament.

== Bibliography ==
- Boles, Nick (2010). Which Way's Up? The future for Coalition Britain and how to get there. Biteback. ISBN 978-1-84954-063-6.
- Vaizey, Edward; Gove, Michael; Boles, Nicholas (2001). A blue tomorrow. Politico's Pub. ISBN 978-1-84275-027-8.

== See also ==
- Norway-plus model

Non-profit organization positions
New office	Director of Policy Exchange; 2002–2007	Succeeded by Anthony Browne
Parliament of the United Kingdom
Preceded by Quentin Davies	Member of Parliament for Grantham and Stamford; 2010–2019	Succeeded by Gareth Davies
