= Ivor Caplin =

British Labour Party politician (born 1958)

Parliamentary Under-Secretary of State for Defence
- In office 13 June 2003 – 11 May 2005
- Prime Minister: Tony Blair
- Sec. of State: Geoff Hoon; John Reid
- Preceded by: Lewis Moonie
- Succeeded by: Don Touhig

Member of Parliament for Hove
- In office 1 May 1997 – 11 April 2005
- Preceded by: Tim Sainsbury
- Succeeded by: Celia Barlow

Personal details
- Born: 8 November 1958 (age 67) Brighton, England
- Party: Labour (suspended)

Ivor Keith Caplin (born 8 November 1958) is a British former Labour politician. He was the Member of Parliament (MP) for Hove from 1997 to 2005.

== Early life ==
Caplin was born in Brighton into a Jewish family and educated at the independent King Edward's School, Witley and the Brighton College of Technology. He had a career in marketing with the Legal & General Assurance Society from 1978 to 1997, from 1994 as quality manager in the sales division.

In 1991 he was elected to Hove Borough Council. In 1995, he led Labour's successful campaign to win control of the council and became its leader until April 1997, when it merged with Brighton. He was elected to the new Brighton and Hove Council in 1996 and was deputy leader until he resigned from the council in March 1998.

== Parliamentary career ==
Caplin, described as being from the centrist wing of the Labour Party, was elected as Member of Parliament for Hove in 1997, the city's first gay MP. He became Parliamentary private secretary to Margaret Beckett in 1998.

Following re-election in 2001 Caplin became an assistant government whip. He was a prominent supporter of the 2003 invasion of Iraq, and refused to accept a 1,000 signature petition from constituents against the invasion, resulting in regular demonstrations outside his constituency office.

In June 2003 he was appointed Parliamentary under-secretary of state and Minister for Veterans at the Ministry of Defence. During his term, he introduced the Veteran's Badge for those who had served in HM armed forces.

He was vice chairman of Labour Friends of Israel from 1997 to 2005.

He stood down from the House of Commons at the 2005 general election, following predictions he would lose the seat because of the strength of opposition in his constituency to the invasion of Iraq.

In 2010 Sir Thomas Legg conducted an independent audit of MPs' expenses in which he determined that Caplin should repay £17,865 representing mortgage interest payments claimed on his second home, after Caplin failed to provide paperwork to establish his entitlement to claim the money. Caplin appealed, stating that Legg's letters had gone to an old address and had not been forwarded. On 1 April 2011 his appeal was upheld and the amount of repayment reduced to £1,178.43 (which Caplin had overclaimed due to interest rate fluctuations of which he was unaware); Caplin accepted the finding and agreed to repay the money.

== Post parliamentary career ==
In December 2005, Caplin became a senior consultant for political lobbyists Foresight Communications, but was subsequently criticised by a Whitehall committee in 2006 for accepting lobbying work for the defence industry after being a defence minister without getting the agreement of the Advisory Committee on Business Appointments.

In 2009 Caplin was appointed executive director of Haas Energy, a British company which hoped to obtain oil concessions in Iraq.

Caplin runs his own company Ivor Caplin Consultancy since 2005 which has various clients.

He was the Chair of the Jewish Labour Movement for 2018–2019.

== Suspension and arrest ==
In June 2024 Caplin was suspended from the Labour Party due to "serious allegations" made about him. The allegations were not made public.

In January 2025 Caplin was arrested in Brighton by Sussex Police on suspicion of engaging in online sexual communications with a child, after being involved in an operation carried out by a group of anti-paedophile activists. He was subsequently released on bail, extended a number of times, with the most recent extension requiring Caplin to return to answer bail on 8 October 2025.

According to the Press Gazette "The Ivor Caplin account on X has now been removed but up until [January 2025] it has been sharing, liking and interacting with posts showing explicit pornography, including pictures and videos of naked young people having sex".

A Brighton-based retired Sunday Times journalist and former Labour member shared a screenshot in June 2024 of Caplin's online activities, asking why Caplin was not questioned by the party about it. Following a complaint by a campaigner, the journalist was visited by police in September 2024, declined a police caution, and was subsequently charged under Section 127 of the Communications Act 2003. He was acquitted in November 2025, with the judge stating the journalist was "whistleblowing" and that "context was missing from the prosecution exhibit" as it was "not actually the full tweet and does not disclose the full image, or the thread of the message".

Parliament of the United Kingdom
Preceded by Tim Sainsbury	Member of Parliament for Hove; 1997–2005	Succeeded by Celia Barlow
