= 1965 Hove by-election =

UK parliamentary by-election

The 1965 Hove by-election was a parliamentary by-election for the British House of Commons constituency of Hove held on 22 July 1965.

== Vacancy ==
The by-election was caused by the resignation of Conservative MP Anthony Marlowe. Marlowe had had a heart attack in June 1965. He had been MP here since winning the seat in 1950.

== Election history ==
Hove had been won by the Conservatives at every election since 1950 when the seat was created. The result at the last General election was as follows;

General election 1964: Hove
Party	Candidate	Votes	%	±%
Conservative	Anthony Marlowe	32,923	68.4	−6.4
Labour	Thomas James Marsh	15,214	32.3	+6.4
Majority		17,709	36.8	–12.8
Turnout		48,137	69.6	−2.6
Conservative hold		Swing	-6.4	

== Candidates ==
- The Conservatives selected 44-year-old former MP Martin Maddan. He had sat for Hitchin, Hertfordshire from 1955 to 1964. He had been defeated at the general election the previous year.
- Labour re-selected 50-year-old Thomas James Marsh who had stood here at the previous general election when he came second. Marsh was a company secretary and accountant. He had been educated at Worthing High School, West Sussex. He had been a member of Southwick Urban Council since 1948 and of West Sussex County Council from 1952 to 1955 and since 1958. He was a member of the executive committee of the Southern Regional Labour Party.
- The Liberals selected 43-year-old Oliver Moxon. He had been educated at Gresham's School, Holt. He was an author who was standing for parliament for the first time. The Liberals had not fielded a candidate since 1950 when their candidate polled just 9.7%. Moxon was the brother of actor Timothy Moxon with whom, after the war, he founded the New Torch Theatre in London.
- An Independent candidate, 64-year-old Max Cossman, put himself forward. He was a Company secretary who had been raised in Austria where he became a graduate in law and economics at Vienna University.

== Result ==
It was won by the Conservatives' Martin Maddan. There was a 6.2% swing against the Conservatives;

1965 Hove by-election
Party	Candidate	Votes	%	±%
Conservative	William Francis Martin Maddan	25,339	62.0	−6.4
Labour	Thomas James Marsh	8,387	21.0	−10.6
Liberal	Oliver Charles Napier Moxon	6,867	16.7	New
Independent	Max Cossman	121	0.3	New
Majority		16,952	41.0	+4.2
Turnout		40,714	58.2	−11.4
Conservative hold		Swing	+2.1	

== Aftermath ==
The result at the 1966 general election;

General election 1966: Hove
Party	Candidate	Votes	%	±%
Conservative	William Francis Martin Maddan	28,799	57.2	−4.8
Labour	Trevor Williams	12,909	25.7	+4.7
Liberal	Oliver Charles Napier Moxon	8,037	16.0	−0.7
Independent	Max Cossmann	574	1.1	+0.8
Majority		15,890	31.6	−9.5
Turnout		50,319	72.1	+13.9
Conservative hold		Swing	-4.7	

Moxon contested Brighton Kemptown in 1970 Sidcup, against Prime Minister Edward Heath, before moving to Jamaica. Marsh did not stand again.

== See also ==
- List of United Kingdom by-elections
