= Veteran's Badge =

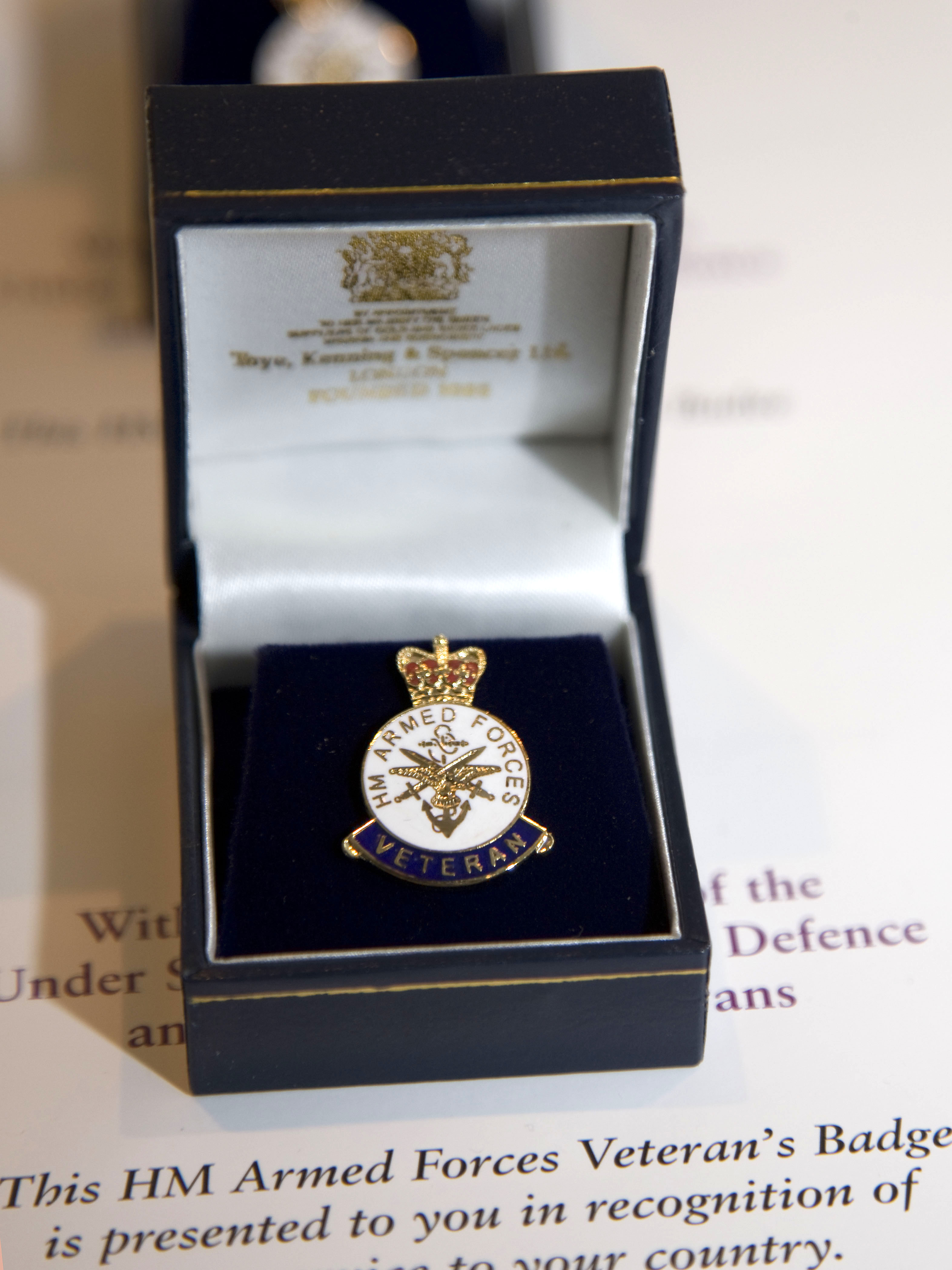
- A Veteran's Badge in its presentation box.
- Awarded for: Serving in either the British Army, Royal Navy, Royal Marines, Royal Air Force, Regular Reserves or the Volunteer Reserve (Army Reserve, Royal Auxiliary Air Force, Royal Naval Reserve, Royal Marines Reserve).
- Country: United Kingdom
- Status: Currently Awarded
- Established: 2004

The Veteran's Badge is a badge awarded by the Ministry of Defence to any person who served in the British Army, Royal Navy, Royal Marines, Royal Air Force, Volunteer or Regular Reserves of the British Armed Forces.

== History ==
In 2004, the Veteran's Badge was established by the then Minister for Veterans Ivor Caplin to show that a person had served in the British Armed Forces, though the badge was exclusively awarded to Second World War Veterans at the start. This was later changed when the categories were broadened so that any veteran of the British Armed Forces and the civilian service the Air Transport Auxiliary may apply and receive one.

The aim of the badge was to make identifying veterans in public easier. The first Veteran's Badge was awarded to Lord Healey who served at the Battle of Monte Cassino.

The badge is not awarded posthumously.

== Description ==
The badge is an enamelled, engraved, and pinned, lapel badge with the words 'HM Armed Forces - Veteran'. It encompasses the Tri-Service, Anchor of the Royal Navy, Crossed Swords of the British Army and Eagle motif of the Royal Air Force.

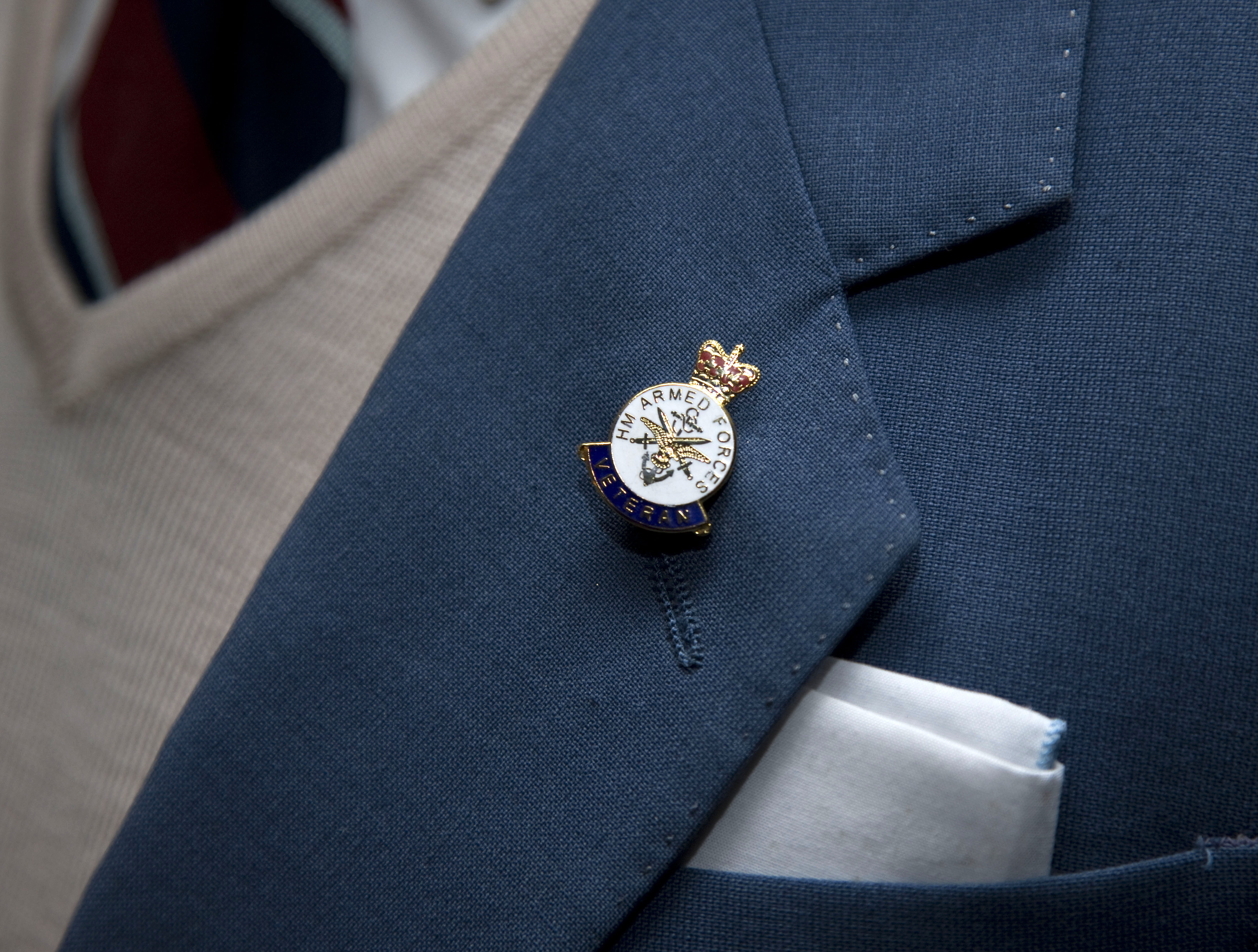
A Veteran's Badge being worn on a lapel.

== See also ==
- Honours Committee
- Military awards and decorations of the United Kingdom
