= Anthony Marlowe (politician) =

British barrister and politician

Anthony Marlowe QC

Member of Parliament for Hove
- In office 23 February 1950 – June 1965
- Preceded by: New constituency
- Succeeded by: Martin Maddan

Member of Parliament for Brighton
- In office 15 November 1941 – 3 February 1950
- Preceded by: Lord Erskine
- Succeeded by: Constituency abolished

Personal details
- Born: Anthony Alfred Harmsworth Marlowe; 25 October 1904
- Died: 8 September 1965 (aged 60)
- Party: Conservative
- Spouse: Patricia Mary Hastings (m. 1929)
- Education: Marlborough College; Trinity College, Cambridge

Anthony Alfred Harmsworth Marlowe, QC (25 October 1904 – 8 September 1965) was a British barrister and politician, who served as a member of parliament (MP) for 24 years.

== Family ==
Marlowe was the son of Thomas Marlowe, who was editor of the Daily Mail from 1899 to 1926 and also Chairman of Associated Newspapers. Thomas Marlowe gave his son the middle names 'Alfred Harmsworth' from the company's founder Alfred Harmsworth. He was sent to Marlborough College, from where he went on to Trinity College, Cambridge.

== Legal career ==
Anthony Marlowe was interested in the practice of law from an early age and was called to the Bar (Inner Temple) in 1928. The next year, he married the daughter of well-known Barrister Sir Patrick Hastings. He practised in London on the South-Eastern Circuit. At the time of the Munich crisis, Marlowe enlisted in the Army Officers' Reserve, and he joined up full-time during the Second World War; he served as a Lieutenant-Colonel on the staff of the Judge Advocate-General. At the end of the war, Marlowe was appointed as a King's Counsel and presided at several war crimes trials in Germany covering Nazi atrocities.

== Entry into politics ==
In November 1941, Marlowe had been elected unopposed as a Conservative Member of Parliament for Brighton, and kept the seat at the 1945 general election.

== Boundary changes ==
The two-member Brighton constituency was very large, and was divided in three at the 1950 general election, producing a safe Conservative seat in Brighton Pavilion, a potentially marginal seat in Brighton Kemptown, and an even safer Conservative seat in Hove. Marlowe was chosen for this seat, with the other sitting member William Teeling standing in Pavilion. Marlowe found that Hove remained safely Conservative for the rest of his career.

== Parliamentary career ==
Marlowe, who continued his legal career in parallel with his Parliamentary one, was a backbencher in the House of Commons. He enjoyed the freedom to criticise proposals by the Conservative government of Winston Churchill, and in 1953 led a rebellion against the government's refusal to restore a 20-year-old cut in service officers' pensions. The rebels eventually won. Later in the 1950s Marlowe joined a group who protested about the effects of decontrolling private housing rents.

From 1960, Marlowe pressed for private healthcare patients to be given the right to buy prescription drugs at the same prices as those charged to NHS patients. In general Marlowe was a right-winger, and he abstained on a vote to endorse the Macmillan government's bid to join the European Economic Community.

== Health concerns ==
Safely re-elected at the 1964 general election, Marlowe suffered a mild heart attack at the end of March 1965. He took some time to recover and had to be taken in an ambulance to vote in a crunch debate on steel nationalisation that May. He then announced that, on medical advice, he would not fight the next election. In fact, Marlowe's health took a turn for the worse, and he resigned his seat in June, dying in September, aged 60.

Parliament of the United Kingdom
Preceded by Lord Erskine; Sir Cooper Rawson	Member of Parliament for Brighton; 1941 – 1950; With: Sir Cooper Rawson 1941–1944; William Teeling 1944–1950	Constituency abolished
New constituency	Member of Parliament for Hove; 1950 – 1965	Succeeded by Martin Maddan
