= Timothy Moxon =

British actor

- Born: Timothy Napier Moxon; 2 June 1924; Kent, England
- Died: 5 December 2006 (aged 82); Montego Bay, Jamaica
- Years active: 1962–2000
- Spouse: Margaret Stewart-Glass
- Children: Judi Moxon-Zakka, Deborah Moxon-Jaile, Wayne Moxon and Sarah-Jane Moxon

Timothy Napier Moxon (2 June 1924 – 5 December 2006) was an English-born actor, pilot and restaurateur who is probably best known for playing Strangways, the character who uttered the first dialogue in the first James Bond film Dr. No, and was the first character to die in the film series.

Timothy Moxon is mentioned and quoted in British historian Matthew Parker's Random House 2014 book: Goldeneye: Where James Bond Was Born: Ian Fleming's Jamaica.

Timothy Moxon was interviewed in 2005 in Jamaica by Lee Pfeiffer, editor-in-chief of Cinema Retro magazine for the Movie Classics special edition of The First James Bond Film – Dr. No. (pages 28 – 29).

== Early life and career ==
Moxon was born in Kent, England and served in the Royal Air Force in the Second World War, training as a pilot in Canada, and flying aircraft that towed troop-carrying gliders across occupied Europe. After the war he acted in repertory theatre and, with his brother Oliver Moxon, founded the New Torch Theatre, London. He was also a pilot with BEA, and for an agricultural crop spraying company in Sudan and Jamaica, where he remained for the rest of his life, settling in Oracabessa. Tim also was a pilot for Reynolds Metals Co. in British Guiana (now Guyana) during the early 1960s, flying in and out of Kwakwani, while also living there.

== Dr. No ==
Moxon was working as a crop dusting pilot when he had a chance meeting at the Courtleigh Manor Hotel in Kingston, Jamaica, with the director Terence Young, who remembered him as an actor on the London stage. Young offered him a small role at the start of the film, as a British agent who leaves a card game to take a phone call, and is murdered by three assassins posing as blind men. It transpires that the character was killed, because he was investigating the activities of the villainous Dr. No, and revealed this to his friend Professor Dent, who was secretly working for No.

In 1967, he had a role in another film shot in the Caribbean entitled Come Spy with Me, and in his later years he appeared in local theatre productions, in a documentary film entitled Inside Dr. No and at James Bond fan events where he signed autographs.

== Later life ==
He founded the Jamaican charter airline TimAir, and for a short time ran a hot air balloon business for tourists. He performed in many plays with his friend Norma at Montego Bay theatre. Timothy Moxon also managed The Houseboat Restaurant in Freeport, Montego Bay as a fondue restaurant for many years. Timothy Moxon’s screen shot as Agent 007 in James Bond movie ‘Dr. No’ is still being prominently featured by owners of The Houseboat website as a tourist attraction. He died aged 82 in 2006 leaving a son, two daughters and five grandchildren.

== Filmography ==
Year	Title	Role	Notes
1962	Dr. No	John Strangways	Film debut, Uncredited
1967	Come Spy with Me	Morgan	Final film
