= Des Wilson =

British author (born 1941)

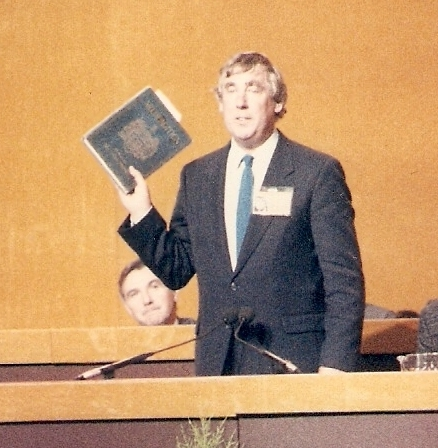
Des Wilson in 1987 as president of the Liberal party, holding as symbol of his office a copy of John Milton's Areopagitica

Des Wilson (born 5 March 1941) is a New Zealand-born British campaigner, political activist, businessman, sports administrator, author and poker player. He was one of the founders of the British homelessness charity Shelter and was for a while an activist in, and President of, the British Liberal Party.

== Background ==
From a working-class family in New Zealand, Wilson attended Waitaki Boys' High School, leaving at 15 to become a reporter on the local newspaper. After periods working for the Otago Daily Times and the Evening Star in Dunedin, and the Melbourne Star in Melbourne, Australia, Wilson moved to the United Kingdom in 1960 at the age of 19.

Over the next few years he took a range of jobs before becoming a journalist. He became the founding director of the housing charity Shelter in 1966, and then became a columnist for The Observer newspaper. He also spent two years as director of public affairs for the Royal Shakespeare Company. He edited the magazine Social Work Today for the British Association of Social Workers. He then returned to campaigning, running Friends of the Earth and the Campaign for Freedom of Information and CLEAR, the Campaign for Lead Free Air.

In December 1968, Wilson was Michael Parkinson's 'castaway' on BBC Radio 4's Desert Island Discs.

In many ways an anti-establishment radical, he joined the Liberal Party in order to stand in the 1973 Hove by-election. Although unsuccessful, he stayed involved in the Liberal Party and in 1986 he became its president, a position which allowed him to act as its campaign director in the 1987 General Election. He later wrote a book, The Battle For Power, about the strained relationship between the Liberals and the Social Democratic Party (SDP) during that campaign, the last general election fought as the SDP–Liberal Alliance. He was an enthusiastic supporter of the merger between the two parties in 1988 and became Campaign Manager for the new party the Liberal Democrats under Paddy Ashdown in the 1992 General Election.

Somewhat disillusioned with party politics after that campaign, Wilson then moved on to become Director of Corporate and Public Affairs for BAA plc. He became chairman of the England and Wales Cricket Board's corporate affairs and marketing committee in 2003, but resigned in 2004 over the controversy related to England touring Zimbabwe.

== Bibliography ==
- Wilson, Des (1983). The Lead Scandal. Ashgate. ISBN 0-435-83946-2.
- Wilson, Des (1984). Secrets File: The Case for Freedom of Information in Britain Today. Heinemann Educ. ISBN 0-435-83939-X.
- Wilson, Des (1984). The Environmental Crisis: A Handbook for All Friends of the Earth. Ashgate. ISBN 0-435-83944-6.
- Wilson, Des; Andrews, Leighton (1994). Campaigning: The A to Z of Public Advocacy. Thorogood. ISBN 1-85418-036-3.
- Wilson, Des (2006). Swimming with the Devilfish... Under the Surface of Professional Poker. Macmillan. ISBN 1-4050-8952-0.
- Wilson, Des (2007). Ghosts at the Table: The amazing story of Poker... the world's most popular game. Mainstream Publishing. ISBN 9781845962081.
- Wilson, Des (3 March 2011). Memoirs of a Minor Public Figure (Hardcover ed.). Quartet Books. ISBN 978-0704372054.

== Sources ==
- BBC article, Shelter in 1969

Party political offices
Preceded by David Penhaligon	President of the Liberal Party; 1986–1987	Succeeded by Adrian Slade
