= 1973 Hove by-election =

1973 UK parliamentary by-election

The 1973 Hove by-election was held on 8 November 1973 for the British House of Commons constituency of Hove in East Sussex.

The by-election was caused by the death of Conservative Party Member of Parliament Martin Maddan.

Hove was a safe Conservative seat, having been held by the party since its creation for the 1950 general election. At the 1970 general election, the Conservatives had won over two-thirds of the votes cast.

The Conservative candidate was Tim Sainsbury, a member of the board of supermarket chain J Sainsbury plc. Former Labour Party MP Desmond Donnelly was unsuccessful in getting the Conservative nomination.

Labour, who had put up the only other candidate in 1970, stood Ronald Wallis. The Liberal Party, who had not stood a candidate in 1970, but had won 16% of the vote in 1966, stood New Zealand-born Des Wilson, one of the founders of Shelter.

Two other candidates stood. The far right National Front stood John Harrison-Broadley, a former Royal Air Force squadron leader and bobsleigh champion, while the Maoist Communist Party of England (Marxist-Leninist) stood Carole Reakes.

== Result ==
Sainsbury held the seat for the Conservatives, although the party now gained less than half of the votes cast. This was largely due to a strong result for Wilson, who took the Liberals into second place, while the Labour vote fell sharply; Labour in fact lost their deposit.

Sainsbury held the seat until he stood down at the 1997 general election. Wilson became the Vice Chair of the Liberal Party, and later the Campaign Director for the Liberal Democrats at the 1992 general election.

Hove by-election, 1973
Party	Candidate	Votes	%	±%
Conservative	Tim Sainsbury	22,070	47.8	– 20.9
Liberal	Des Wilson	17,224	37.3	New
Labour	Ronald Wallis	5,335	11.6	– 19.7
National Front	John Harrison-Broadley	1,409	3.1	New
Marxist-Leninist (England)	Carole Reakes	128	0.3	New
Majority		4,846	10.5	−26.9
Turnout		46,166		
Conservative hold		Swing	-29.2	
