= Martin Maddan =

British politician

Member of Parliament for Hove
- In office 22 July 1965 – 22 August 1973
- Preceded by: Anthony Marlowe
- Succeeded by: Tim Sainsbury

Member of Parliament for Hitchin
- In office 26 May 1955 – 25 September 1964
- Preceded by: Nigel Fisher
- Succeeded by: Shirley Williams

Personal details
- Born: William Francis Martin Maddan; 4 October 1920 Stockport, England
- Died: 22 August 1973 (aged 52) London, England
- Party: Conservative
- Spouse: Susanne Huband (m. 1958)
- Children: 4
- Education: Brasenose College, Oxford
- Profession: Businessman

Military service
- Branch/service: Royal Marines
- Years of service: 1939–1946
- Rank: Major
- Battles/wars: World War II

William Francis Martin Maddan (4 October 1920 – 22 August 1973) was a British businessman and Conservative Party politician. He was the Member of Parliament (MP) for Hitchin from 1955 until 1964, and for Hove from 1965 until his death.

== Background ==
Maddan was born in 1920 in Stockport, and was educated at Fettes College and Brasenose College, Oxford. He was in the Royal Marines from 1939 to 1946, where he attained the rank of major.

Maddan was a businessman who worked in market research with a focus on television. He worked for Television Audience Management and the Market Research Society in the 1950s. In 1962, he co-founded AGB [Audits of Great Britain] Research Ltd, and became its chairman.

== Political career ==
Maddan was a member of the London Municipal Society from 1949 to 1950. He was the Conservative candidate at Battersea in 1950, but lost the election. He became MP for Hitchin in 1955, and served until his defeat by Shirley Williams of the Labour Party in 1964. The following year, he was elected MP for Hove in a by-election. He was a longtime advocate for the European Common Market.

== Personal life and death ==
In 1958, Maddan married Susanne Huband, and they had four children.

On 22 August 1973, Maddan collapsed and died while leaving his office in London. He was 52.

Parliament of the United Kingdom
Preceded by Nigel Fisher	Member of Parliament for Hitchin; 1955 – 1964	Succeeded by Shirley Williams
Preceded by Anthony Marlowe	Member of Parliament for Hove; 1965 – 1973	Succeeded by Tim Sainsbury
