= Peter Kyle =

British politician (born 1970)

The Right Honourable Peter Kyle MP
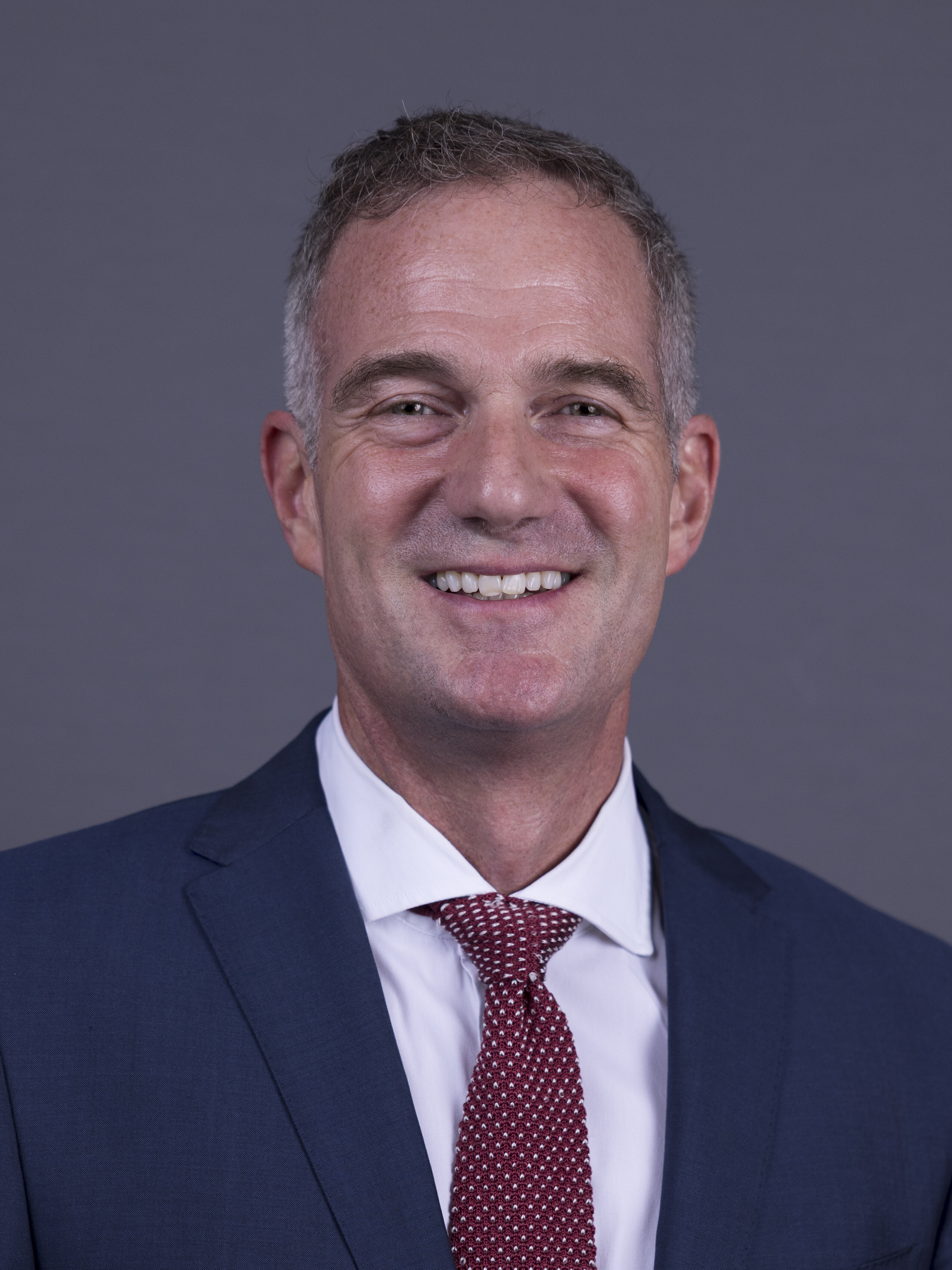
- Official portrait, 2025

Secretary of State for Business and Trade President of the Board of Trade
- In office 5 September 2025 – 20 July 2026
- Prime Minister: Keir Starmer
- Preceded by: Jonathan Reynolds
- Succeeded by: Jonathan Reynolds

Secretary of State for Science, Innovation and Technology
- In office 5 July 2024 – 5 September 2025
- Prime Minister: Keir Starmer
- Preceded by: Michelle Donelan
- Succeeded by: Liz Kendall
Shadow cabinet posts 2021‍–‍2024
Shadow Secretary of State for Science, Innovation and Technology
In office 4 September 2023 – 5 July 2024
Leader	Keir Starmer
Preceded by	Office established
Succeeded by	Andrew Griffith
Shadow Secretary of State for Northern Ireland
In office 29 November 2021 – 4 September 2023
Leader	Keir Starmer
Preceded by	Louise Haigh
Succeeded by	Hilary Benn
Junior shadow portfolios 2020‍–‍2021
Shadow Minister for Schools
In office 14 May 2021 – 29 November 2021
Leader	Keir Starmer
Preceded by	Wes Streeting
Succeeded by	Stephen Morgan
Shadow Minister for Victims and Youth Justice
In office 9 April 2020 – 14 May 2021
Leader	Keir Starmer
Preceded by	Position established
Succeeded by	Anna McMorrin

Member of Parliament for Hove and Portslade Hove (2015–2024)
- Incumbent
- Assumed office 7 May 2015
- Preceded by: Mike Weatherley
- Majority: 19,881 (38.1%)

Personal details
- Born: Peter John Kyle; 9 September 1970 (age 56) West Sussex, England
- Party: Labour
- Education: Felpham Comprehensive School; University of Sussex (BSc, PhD)
- Website: www.peterkyle.co.uk

Academic background
- Thesis: Building capacity for community economic development: the case of the Kat river valley, South Africa (2004)

Peter John Kyle (born 9 September 1970) is a British politician who served as Secretary of State for Business and Trade and President of the Board of Trade from September 2025 to July 2026. He previously served as Secretary of State for Science, Innovation and Technology from July 2024 to September 2025. A member of the Labour Party, he has been the Member of Parliament (MP) for Hove and Portslade, formerly Hove, since 2015.

Born in West Sussex, Kyle studied at Felpham Comprehensive School. He studied Geography, International Development, and Environmental Studies at the University of Sussex, and later earned a doctorate in Community Development. After university, he worked as an aid worker for Children on the Edge in Eastern Europe and the Balkans. In 2006, he became a Cabinet Office special adviser where he focused on social exclusion policy. At the 2015 general election, Kyle was elected to Parliament as MP for Hove. He was reelected in the 2017 and 2019 general elections. Kyle joined the shadow frontbench under leader Keir Starmer as Shadow Minister for Victims and Youth Justice in April 2020. He was appointed the Shadow Minister for Schools in May 2021.

Kyle was promoted to the shadow cabinet as Shadow Northern Ireland Secretary in November 2021. In the 2023 British shadow cabinet reshuffle, he was appointed Shadow Science Secretary. Following the 2024 general election and subsequent formation of the Starmer ministry, Kyle was appointed to the Cabinet as Secretary of State for Science, Innovation and Technology. As Science Secretary, he oversaw the implementation of the Online Safety Act. In the 2025 cabinet reshuffle, he was appointed Secretary of State for Business and Trade and President of the Board of Trade. He was dismissed from the government by Andy Burnham in 2026 and subsequently returned to the backbenches.

== Early life and career ==
Kyle was born on 9 September 1970 and grew up in West Sussex, where he was educated at Felpham Comprehensive School (now Felpham Community College), near Bognor Regis. It was at school that he found out he had dyslexia and left school, in his own words, "without any usable qualifications".

By the age of 25, he was accepted on his third attempt to become a student at the University of Sussex, where he gained a degree in geography, international development, and environmental studies, and later a doctorate in community development.

After university, Kyle worked as an aid worker and as a project director for the charity Children on the Edge in Eastern Europe and the Balkans helping young people whose lives had been affected by the political instability created by the Bosnian War and Kosovan War, helping to establish an orphanage in Romania.

In 2006, Kyle became a Cabinet Office special adviser focusing on social exclusion policy.

From 2007 to 2013, he was deputy chief executive of the Association of Chief Executives of Voluntary Organisations (ACEVO). In 2013, he became chief executive of Working for Youth, a newly formed charity focusing on helping unemployed youth.

== Parliamentary career ==
=== Backbenches (2015–2020) ===
==== First term ====
At the 2015 general election, Kyle was elected to Parliament as MP for Hove with 42.3% of the vote and a majority of 1,236.

Kyle backed Liz Kendall in the 2015 Labour leadership election, and supported Owen Smith in the failed attempt to replace Jeremy Corbyn in the 2016 Labour leadership election.

In December 2015, Kyle voted in favour of the United Kingdom carrying out air strikes against Islamic State in Syria. He subsequently claimed that anti-war activists had sent him a picture of a dead baby, which he claimed was a form of harassment and intimidation. Also stating that, "People have put deep thought and a lot of anguish into this decision and are taking a very principled stance. We need to have respect for each other's views on this."

Kyle sat on the Business, Energy and Industrial Strategy Select Committee between 2016 and 2020. In May 2016, he questioned Mike Ashley, boss of Sports Direct, over poor working practices in his warehouses. Ashley accused Kyle of making "defamatory comments" against him and called for the MP to stand down from the committee.

He campaigned for remaining in the European Union during the 2016 Brexit referendum. In 2018, he rebelled against the Conservative government and the Labour Party whip in order to vote in favour of an amendment which would have kept the United Kingdom in the European Economic Area (EEA) in the event of the country leaving the European Union.

Kyle has championed apprenticeships, pledging in August 2016 to create 1,000 apprenticeships in 1,000 days in co-operation with the council and via the creation of a Greater Brighton Employer Skills Task Force.

==== Second term ====
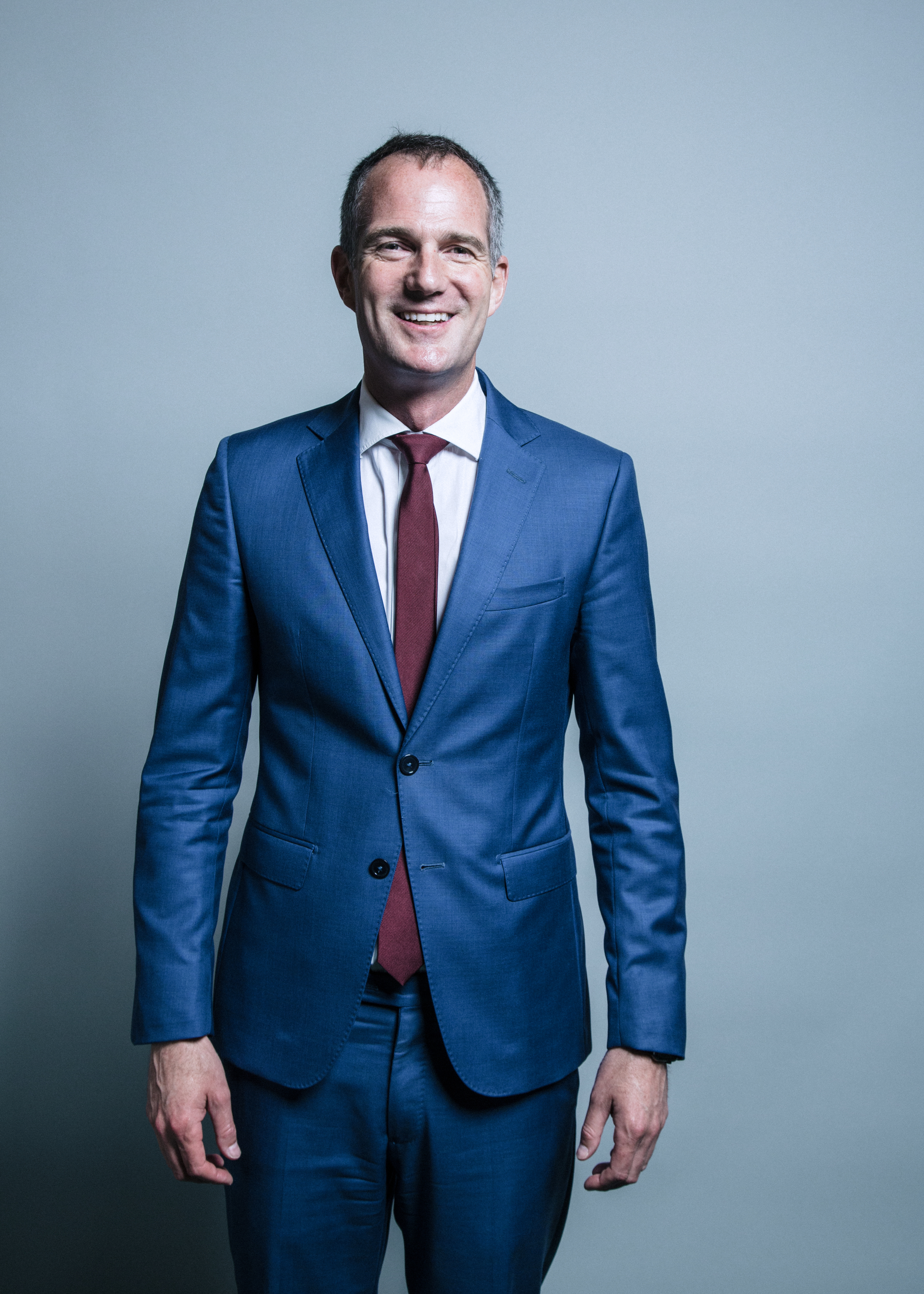
Official portrait, 2017

Kyle was re-elected as MP for Hove at the snap 2017 general election with an increased vote share of 64.1% and an increased majority of 18,757.

In May 2018 Kyle called for the voting age to be lowered to 16 and put forward his own bill to this effect. The bill failed to pass after the Conservative Party employed a filibuster to prevent a vote on the bill being held in the House of Commons.

In March 2019, alongside fellow Labour MP Phil Wilson, Kyle put forward an amendment to Theresa May's Brexit Withdrawal Agreement. Dubbed the "Kyle-Wilson" amendment, it aimed to pass the Withdrawal Agreement Bill on the condition that the deal on offer would go back to the British people through a confirmatory vote. Whilst failing to pass twice in the House of Commons, it came 12 votes short on its second attempt. Both Kyle and Wilson signalled that they would bring back the amendment if Boris Johnson were to return with a Brexit deal in October 2019. Alongside deputy leader of the Labour Party Tom Watson, Kyle advocated for this position to become Labour policy.

A vocal critic of Jeremy Corbyn's leadership of the Labour party, in a 2019 meeting of the Parliamentary Labour Party, Kyle challenged Corbyn "to consider what it is about his world view – separate from a political platform – that has attracted these people into our party in the first place." He also signed an open letter to the Jewish Labour Movement pledging to stamp out antisemitism in the Labour Party, and "urges members of the group not to leave the party and apologises for letting its Jewish supporters down." In 2014 Kyle attended a party delegation to Israel and the Palestinian Territories along with Dame Tessa Jowell and others party figures.

==== Third term ====
At the 2019 general election, Kyle was again re-elected, with a decreased vote share of 58.3% and a decreased majority of 17,044.

Following Labour's defeat in the 2019 general election, Kyle urged Labour leader Jeremy Corbyn to resign, saying that the loss was not related to Labour's position on Brexit but rather to "dissatisfaction with our leadership and seeming incompetence". He endorsed Jess Phillips in the 2020 Labour Party leadership election.

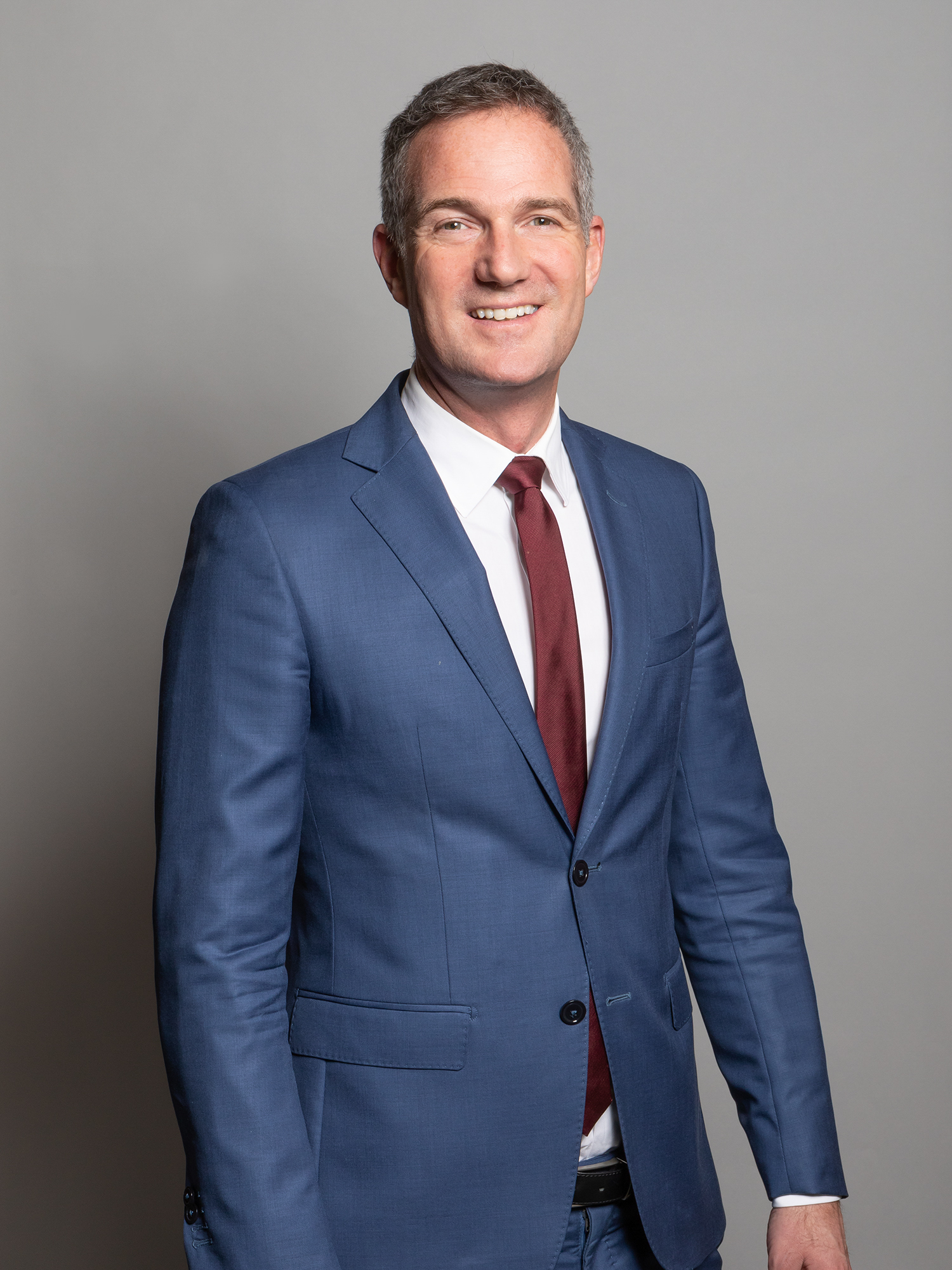
Official portrait, 2020

=== Shadow frontbench (2020–2021) ===
==== Shadow Justice minister ====
In April 2020, he became the shadow minister for victims and youth justice. He has campaigned on the issue of 'sex for rent' and demanded a change to the law for landlords who engage in sexual exploitation of tenants.

In February 2021, Kyle presented a bill for victims to Parliament which had the aims of:

- Ensuring victims are read their rights at the same time as perpetrators
- Creating a register for people who run departments in the justice system which routinely ignore victims' rights
- Giving victims of persistent anti-social behaviour the same rights as victims of crimes
- Making the victims' commissioner independent of government and able to launch their own investigations.

==== Shadow Minister for Schools ====
In a minor Labour reshuffle in May 2021, Kyle was promoted to succeed Wes Streeting as the Shadow Minister for Schools.

=== Shadow cabinet (2021–2024) ===
==== Shadow Northern Ireland Secretary ====
He was appointed Shadow Northern Ireland Secretary in the November 2021 British shadow cabinet reshuffle. In September 2022, he spoke in favour of Labour accepting Brexit and presenting a "positive vision for a better Britain" outside of the European Union.

==== Shadow Science Secretary ====
Peter Kyle was appointed as Shadow Secretary of State for Science, Innovation and Technology in September 2023.

In October 2023 at the Labour Party Conference, Kyle said that a future Labour government would reduce regulations on technology companies in the development and use of Artificial Intelligence and "put it to work for everyone from every background." This led to some resistance by trade unions over concerns about intellectual property and the risk of "rampant profiteering".

Kyle condemned the Hamas October 7 attacks in Israel. On 23 November 2023, he attended and spoke at the March Against Antisemitism in London along with Chief Rabbi Ephraim Mirvis and Conservative MP Robert Jenrick. In December he said that "This is something we must never forget. The Hamas terror attack was done in order to stop processes leading to peaceful existence, not to deliver one. They have sought to wreck any chance of peace. That can't be allowed to happen".

In November 2023, Kyle outlined Labour policies to impose stricter regulations on general artificial intelligence research companies such as OpenAI and Anthropic with stronger requirements for reporting, data-sharing, and user safety. Kyle has also proposed the creation of a 'Regulatory Innovation office', which would expedite important regulatory decisions, the use of 10-year research and development budget settlement, in order to ensure stable long-term private investment, and a new body called 'Skills England', which would bring together "representatives of tertiary education, local and central government with representatives from business leaders and trade unions. In addition to strategic oversight of skills needs across England, the new body will also be responsible for assessing bids for colleges to become 'Technical Excellence Colleges'."

In February 2024, Kyle announced that Labour would scrap the existing voluntary testing agreement between technology companies and the British government, instead creating a statutory regime in which Artificial Intelligence businesses would be required to share with the government the results of their test data. He claimed that this would enable the government to better understand the risks involved in AI and the challenges it could pose to different industries and society in general. He also met with representatives of the United States government and AI companies in Washington, United States, including Microsoft, Amazon, Meta, Google, Apple, OpenAI, and Anthropic.

Peter Kyle endorsed the use of artificial intelligence technology to improve public services, including in the National Health Service and British education system. He also said that "I have seen AI tools which I believe would have caught my mum's cancer earlier. It is personal for me to get this technology used in a way which keeps families together for longer. UK businesses can benefit hugely from the innovation this latest wave of technology can bring."

== Cabinet career (2024–2026) ==
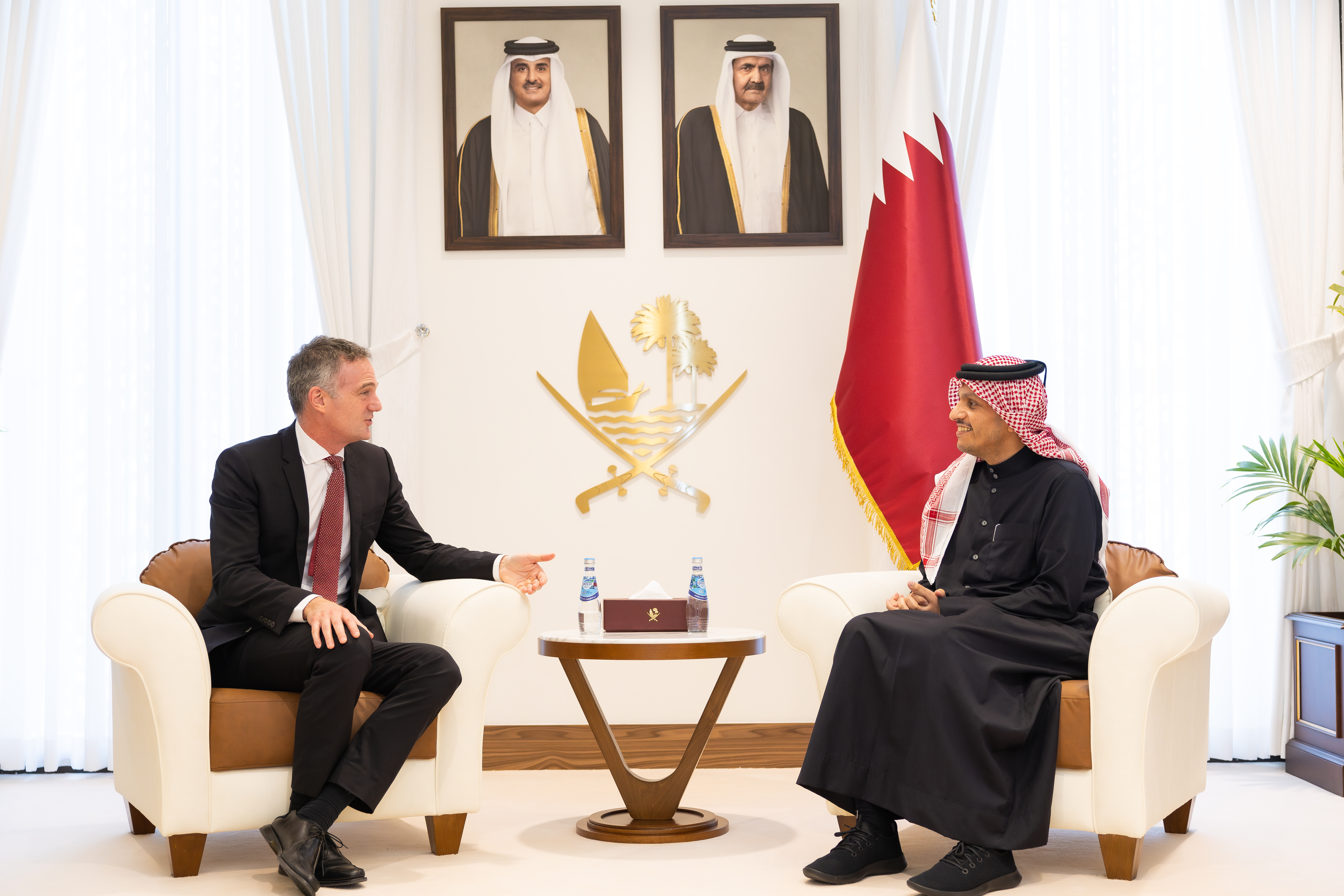
Kyle with Qatar’s Prime Minister Sheikh Mohammed, 17 February 2025

Due to the 2023 review of Westminster constituencies, Kyle's constituency of Hove was renamed Hove and Portslade. At the 2024 general election, Kyle was elected to Parliament as MP for Hove and Portslade with 52.4% of the vote and a majority of 19,881.

=== Science Secretary (2024–2025) ===
Following the Labour Party's victory in the 2024 general election, he was appointed to cabinet as Secretary of State for Science, Innovation and Technology at the subsequent formation of the Starmer ministry.

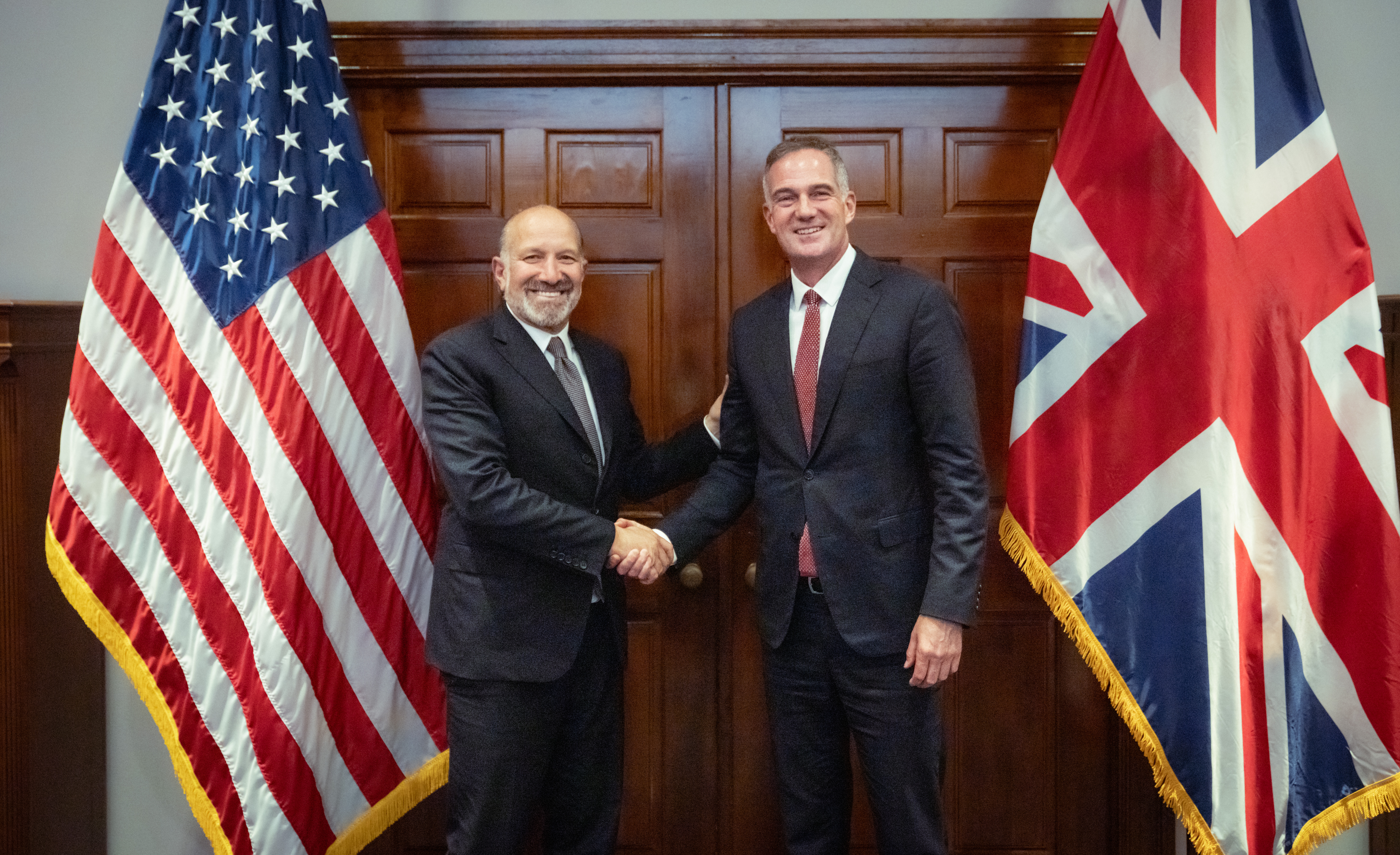
Kyle with US Commerce Secretary Howard Lutnick in September 2025.

==== Online Safety Act ====
The secretary of state for science, innovation and technology was responsible for the implementation of the Online Safety Act 2023, introduced by the previous government.

The U.S. Department of State Human Rights Practices report criticised the Online Safety Act as a hazard to the Freedom of the Press because it pressed U.S. social media platforms to "censor speech deemed misinformation or ‘hate speech’". Kyle defended the act saying it is a vital safeguard for children online.

==== Nigel Farage slur controversy ====
In July 2025, following public criticism of the partly implemented act and an online petition on the official UK Parliament petitions website calling for its repeal which received over half a million signatures, Kyle responded to comments made by Reform UK leader Nigel Farage by stating that Farage was "on the side of sex offenders like Jimmy Savile". When Farage requested an apology, Kyle reiterated his position and stated that, "If you want to overturn the Online Safety Act you are on the side of predators. It is as simple as that." This stance was widely derided online, and received criticism from U.S. politicians and technology entrepreneurs.

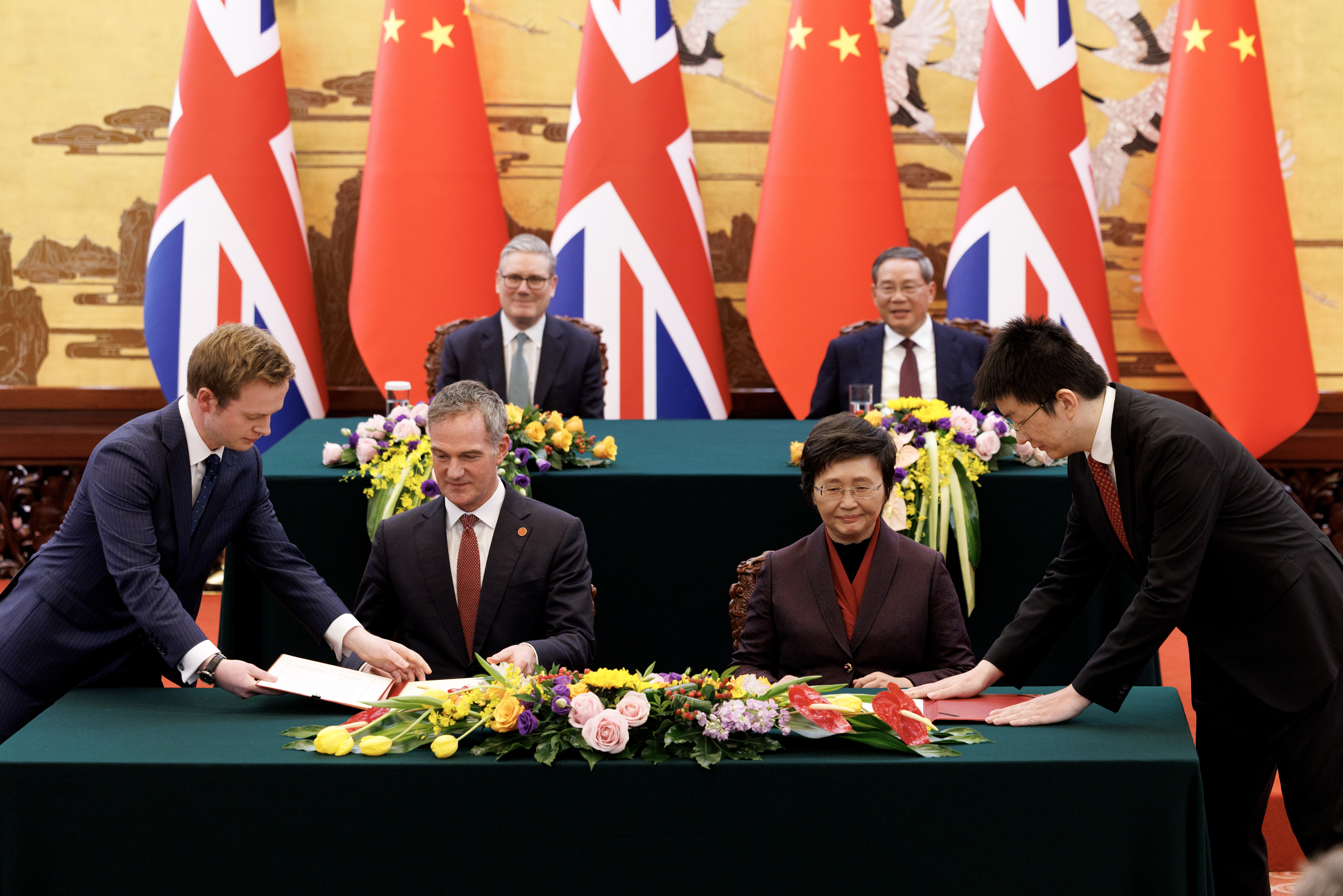
Kyle with British Prime Minister Keir Starmer and China’s Premier Li Qiang in Beijing, China, 29 January 2026

=== Business Secretary (2025–2026) ===
In the 2025 cabinet reshuffle, Kyle was appointed Secretary of State for Business and Trade and President of the Board of Trade, succeeding Jonathan Reynolds.

When Kyle was asked if Peter Mandelson's appointment as UK ambassador to the United States was a mistake following controversy surrounding Mandelson's ties to sex offender Jeffrey Epstein, Kyle said: "They [Virginia Giuffre's family] say it was a mistake. And retrospectively, if we had known the information that we know now, it is highly unlikely that he would have been appointed because what we know now is materially different to what we understood at the time."

On 20 July 2026, Andy Burnham dismissed Kyle from the government.

== Political positions ==
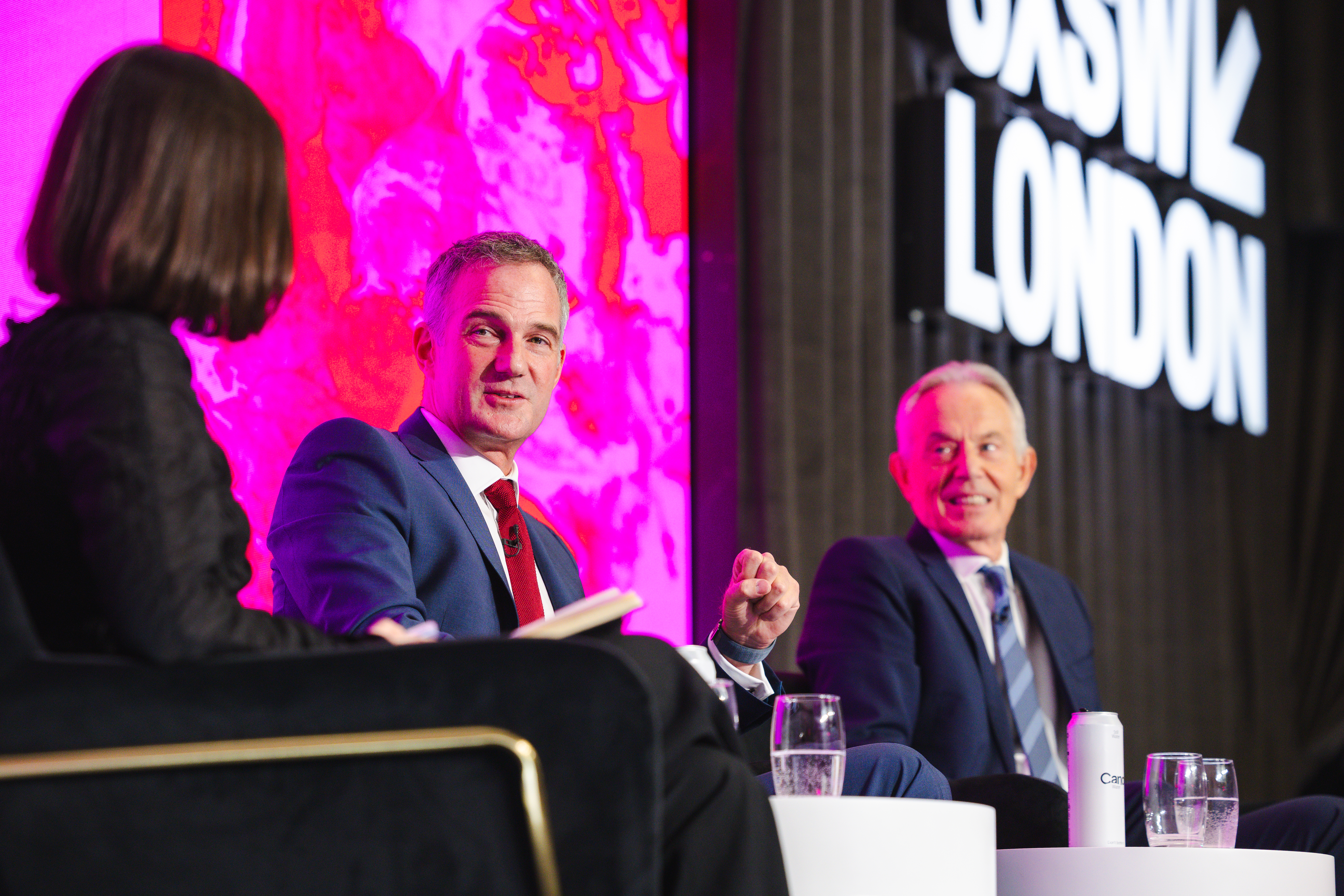
Kyle with Tony Blair in June 2025.

In 2019, when MP Chris Williamson planned to speak about monetary policy in Brighton, Kyle and the Sussex Jewish Representative Council pressured three venues into cancelling the event. This was due to Williamson's statement that the Labour Party had “given too much ground” to people alleging widespread anti-semitism in the Labour Party. Kyle released a statement saying "our city should not be a welcoming place for people who bait the Jewish community or sow seeds of division."

In September 2020, Kyle was appointed a vice-chair of Labour Friends of Israel.

== Personal life ==
From 2016 to 2017 Kyle was chair of governors of Brighton Aldridge Community Academy.

He is a member of the Fabian Society.

For eight years he was in a relationship with Czech-born Vlastimil Tiser until Tiser was killed in 2012. His mother died of cancer six days later. He said in an interview with The Times that "2012, the year of the Olympics, one of the best years for many people, was the worst year of my life. [...] I was on autopilot. There was constant adrenaline. Then afterwards, silence."

Kyle was sworn of the Privy Council on 10 July 2024, entitling him to be styled "The Right Honourable" for life.

Parliament of the United Kingdom
Preceded by Mike Weatherley	Member of Parliament for Hove; 2015–present	Incumbent
Political offices
Preceded by Michelle Donelan	Secretary of State for Science, Innovation and Technology; 2024–2025	Succeeded by Liz Kendall
Preceded by Jonathan Reynolds	Secretary of State for Business and Trade; 2025–2026	Succeeded by Jonathan Reynolds
