= List of acts of the 1st session of the 58th Parliament of the United Kingdom =

This is a list of acts of the 1st session of the 58th Parliament of the United Kingdom, which ran from 17 December 2019 until 29 April 2021.

Acts passed since 1963 are cited by calendar year, as opposed to the convention used for earlier acts of citing the regnal year(s) in which the relevant parliamentary session was held. Each act passed in a respective year is given a chapter number (abbreviated "c."), denoted by Arabic numerals in the case of public general acts, lowercase Roman numerals in the case of local acts, or italicised Arabic numerals in the case of personal acts. These run as separate series.

54 acts of Parliament were passed by the 58th Parliament in its 1st session; all were public general acts.

indicates that an act has been transcribed on Wikisource, indicates that an act is available to view at legislation.gov.uk, and indicates the location of the original act in the Parliamentary Archives.

== Public general acts ==
| Short title | Citation | Royal assent |
Long title
| European Union (Withdrawal Agreement) Act 2020 | 2020 c. 1 | 23 January 2020 |
An Act to implement, and make other provision in connection with, the agreement between the United Kingdom and the EU under Article 50(2) of the Treaty on European Union which sets out the arrangements for the United Kingdom's withdrawal from the EU.
| Direct Payments to Farmers (Legislative Continuity) Act 2020 | 2020 c. 2 | 30 January 2020 |
An Act to make provision for the incorporation of the Direct Payments Regulation into domestic law; for enabling an increase in the total maximum amount of direct payments under that Regulation; and for connected purposes.
| Terrorist Offenders (Restriction of Early Release) Act 2020 | 2020 c. 3 | 26 February 2020 |
An Act to make provision about the release on licence of offenders convicted of terrorist offences or offences with a terrorist connection; and for connected purposes.
| Supply and Appropriation (Anticipation and Adjustments) Act 2020 | 2020 c. 4 | 16 March 2020 |
An Act to authorise the use of resources for the years ending with 31 March 2020 and 31 March 2021; to authorise the issue of sums out of the Consolidated Fund for those years; and to appropriate the supply authorised by this Act for the year ending with 31 March 2020.
| NHS Funding Act 2020 | 2020 c. 5 | 16 March 2020 |
An Act to make provision regarding the funding of the health service in England in respect of each financial year until the financial year that ends with 31 March 2024.
| Contingencies Fund Act 2020 | 2020 c. 6 | 25 March 2020 |
An Act to make provision increasing the maximum capital of the Contingencies Fund for a temporary period.
| Coronavirus Act 2020 | 2020 c. 7 | 25 March 2020 |
An Act to make provision in connection with coronavirus; and for connected purposes.
| Windrush Compensation Scheme (Expenditure) Act 2020 | 2020 c. 8 | 8 June 2020 |
An Act to provide for the payment out of money provided by Parliament of expenditure incurred by the Secretary of State or a government department under, or in connection with, the Windrush Compensation Scheme.
| Sentencing (Pre-consolidation Amendments) Act 2020 | 2020 c. 9 | 8 June 2020 |
An Act to give effect to Law Commission recommendations relating to commencement of enactments relating to sentencing law and to make provision for pre-consolidation amendments of sentencing law.
| Birmingham Commonwealth Games Act 2020 | 2020 c. 10 | 25 June 2020 |
An Act to make provision about the Commonwealth Games that are to be held principally in Birmingham in 2022; and for connected purposes.
| Divorce, Dissolution and Separation Act 2020 | 2020 c. 11 | 25 June 2020 |
An Act to make in relation to marriage and civil partnership in England and Wales provision about divorce, dissolution and separation; and for connected purposes.
| Corporate Insolvency and Governance Act 2020 | 2020 c. 12 | 25 June 2020 |
An Act to make provision about companies and other entities in financial difficulty; and to make temporary changes to the law relating to the governance and regulation of companies and other entities.
| Supply and Appropriation (Main Estimates) Act 2020 | 2020 c. 13 | 22 July 2020 |
An Act to authorise the use of resources for the year ending with 31 March 2021; to authorise both the issue of sums out of the Consolidated Fund and the application of income for that year; and to appropriate the supply authorised for that year by this Act and by the Supply and Appropriation (Anticipation and Adjustments) Act 2020.
| Finance Act 2020 | 2020 c. 14 | 22 July 2020 |
An Act to grant certain duties, to alter other duties, and to amend the law relating to the national debt and the public revenue, and to make further provision in connection with finance.
| Stamp Duty Land Tax (Temporary Relief) Act 2020 | 2020 c. 15 | 22 July 2020 |
An Act to make provision to reduce for a temporary period the amount of stamp duty land tax chargeable on the acquisition of residential property.
| Business and Planning Act 2020 | 2020 c. 16 | 22 July 2020 |
An Act to make provision relating to the promotion of economic recovery and growth.
| Sentencing Act 2020 | 2020 c. 17 | 22 October 2020 |
An Act to consolidate certain enactments relating to sentencing.
| Extradition (Provisional Arrest) Act 2020 | 2020 c. 18 | 22 October 2020 |
An Act to create a power of arrest, without warrant, for the purpose of extraditing people for serious offences.
| Prisoners (Disclosure of Information About Victims) Act 2020 | 2020 c. 19 | 4 November 2020 |
An Act to require the Parole Board to take into account any failure by a prisoner serving a sentence for unlawful killing or for taking or making an indecent image of a child to disclose information about the victim.
| Immigration and Social Security Co-ordination (EU Withdrawal) Act 2020 | 2020 c. 20 | 11 November 2020 |
An Act to make provision to end rights to free movement of persons under retained EU law and to repeal other retained EU law relating to immigration; to confer power to modify retained direct EU legislation relating to social security co-ordination; and for connected purposes.
| Agriculture Act 2020 | 2020 c. 21 | 11 November 2020 |
An Act to authorise expenditure for certain agricultural and other purposes; to make provision about direct payments following the United Kingdom's departure from the European Union and about payments in response to exceptional market conditions affecting agricultural markets; to confer power to modify retained direct EU legislation relating to agricultural and rural development payments and public market intervention and private storage aid; to make provision about reports on food security; to make provision about the acquisition and use of information connected with food supply chains; to confer powers to make regulations about the imposition of obligations on business purchasers of agricultural products, marketing standards, organic products and the classification of carcasses; to make provision for reports relating to free trade agreements; to make provision for the recognition of associations of agricultural producers which may benefit from certain exemptions from competition law; to make provision about fertilisers; to make provision about the identification and traceability of animals; to make provision about red meat levy in Great Britain; to make provision about agricultural tenancies; to confer power to make regulations about securing compliance with the WTO Agreement on Agriculture; and for connected purposes.
| Fisheries Act 2020 | 2020 c. 22 | 23 November 2020 |
An Act to make provision in relation to fisheries, fishing, aquaculture and marine conservation; to make provision about the functions of the Marine Management Organisation; and for connected purposes.
| Social Security (Up-rating of Benefits) Act 2020 | 2020 c. 23 | 23 November 2020 |
An Act to make provision relating to the up-rating of certain social security benefits.
| Private International Law (Implementation of Agreements) Act 2020 | 2020 c. 24 | 14 December 2020 |
An Act to implement the Hague Conventions of 1996, 2005 and 2007 and to provide for the implementation of other international agreements on private international law.
| Parliamentary Constituencies Act 2020 | 2020 c. 25 | 14 December 2020 |
An Act to make provision about reports of the Boundary Commissions under the Parliamentary Constituencies Act 1986; to make provision about the number of parliamentary constituencies and other rules for the distribution of seats; and for connected purposes.
| Taxation (Post-transition Period) Act 2020 | 2020 c. 26 | 17 December 2020 |
An Act to make provision (including the imposition and regulation of new duties of customs) in connection with goods in Northern Ireland and their movement into or out of Northern Ireland; to make provision amending certain enactments relating to value added tax, excise duty or insurance premium tax; to make provision in connection with the recovery of unlawful state aid in relation to controlled foreign companies; and for connected purposes.
| United Kingdom Internal Market Act 2020 | 2020 c. 27 | 17 December 2020 |
An Act to make provision in connection with the internal market for goods and services in the United Kingdom (including provision about the recognition of professional and other qualifications); to make provision in connection with provisions of the Northern Ireland Protocol relating to trade and state aid; to authorise the provision of financial assistance by Ministers of the Crown in connection with economic development, infrastructure, culture, sport and educational or training activities and exchanges; to make regulation of the provision of distortive or harmful subsidies a reserved or excepted matter; and for connected purposes.
| Trade (Disclosure of Information) Act 2020 | 2020 c. 28 | 17 December 2020 |
An Act to make provision about the disclosure of information relating to trade.
| European Union (Future Relationship) Act 2020 | 2020 c. 29 | 31 December 2020 |
An Act to make provision to implement, and make other provision in connection with, the Trade and Cooperation Agreement; to make further provision in connection with the United Kingdom's future relationship with the EU and its member States; to make related provision about passenger name record data, customs and privileges and immunities; and for connected purposes.
| Pension Schemes Act 2021 | 2021 c. 1 | 11 February 2021 |
An Act to make provision about pension schemes.
| High Speed Rail (West Midlands - Crewe) Act 2021 | 2021 c. 2 | 11 February 2021 |
An Act to make provision for a railway between a junction with Phase One of High Speed 2, near Fradley Wood in Staffordshire, and a junction with the West Coast Main Line near Crewe in Cheshire; and for connected purposes.
| Medicines and Medical Devices Act 2021 | 2021 c. 3 | 11 February 2021 |
An Act to make provision about a Commissioner for Patient Safety in relation to human medicines and medical devices; confer power to amend or supplement the law relating to human medicines, veterinary medicines and medical devices; make provision about the enforcement of regulations, and the protection of health and safety, in relation to medical devices; and for connected purposes.
| Covert Human Intelligence Sources (Criminal Conduct) Act 2021 | 2021 c. 4 | 1 March 2021 |
An Act to make provision for, and in connection with, the authorisation of criminal conduct in the course of, or otherwise in connection with, the conduct of covert human intelligence sources.
| Ministerial and other Maternity Allowances Act 2021 | 2021 c. 5 | 1 March 2021 |
An Act to make provision for payments to or in respect of Ministers and holders of Opposition offices on maternity leave.
| Supply and Appropriation (Anticipation and Adjustments) Act 2021 | 2021 c. 6 | 15 March 2021 |
An Act to authorise the use of resources for the years ending with 31 March 2019, 31 March 2020, 31 March 2021 and 31 March 2022; to authorise the issue of sums out of the Consolidated Fund for the years ending 31 March 2020, 31 March 2021 and 31 March 2022; and to appropriate the supply authorised by this Act for the years ending with 31 March 2019, 31 March 2020 and 31 March 2021.
| Telecommunications Infrastructure (Leasehold Property) Act 2021 | 2021 c. 7 | 15 March 2021 |
An Act to amend the electronic communications code set out in Schedule 3A to the Communications Act 2003; and for connected purposes.
| Non-Domestic Rating (Lists) Act 2021 | 2021 c. 8 | 15 March 2021 |
An Act to make provision to change the dates on which non-domestic rating lists must be compiled; and to change the dates by which proposed lists must be sent to billing authorities, the Secretary of State or the Welsh Ministers.
| Contingencies Fund Act 2021 | 2021 c. 9 | 15 March 2021 |
An Act to make provision increasing the maximum capital of the Contingencies Fund for a temporary period.
| Trade Act 2021 | 2021 c. 10 | 29 April 2021 |
An Act to make provision about international trade agreements; to make provision establishing the Trade Remedies Authority and conferring functions on it; to make provision about the Trade and Agriculture Commission; and to make provision about the collection and disclosure of information relating to trade.
| Counter-Terrorism and Sentencing Act 2021 | 2021 c. 11 | 29 April 2021 |
An Act to make provision about the sentencing of offenders convicted of terrorism offences, of offences with a terrorist connection or of certain other offences; to make other provision in relation to terrorism; and for connected purposes.
| Air Traffic Management and Unmanned Aircraft Act 2021 | 2021 c. 12 | 29 April 2021 |
An Act to make provision about airspace change proposals, about the licensing regime for air traffic services under Part 1 of the Transport Act 2000 and about airport slot allocation, to confer police powers relating to unmanned aircraft and requirements in Air Navigation Orders and to provide for fixed penalties for certain offences relating to unmanned aircraft.
| Non-Domestic Rating (Public Lavatories) Act 2021 | 2021 c. 13 | 29 April 2021 |
An Act to confer relief from non-domestic rates for hereditaments in England and Wales that consist wholly or mainly of public lavatories; and for connected purposes.
| Forensic Science Regulator Act 2021 | 2021 c. 14 | 29 April 2021 |
An Act to make provision for the appointment of the Forensic Science Regulator; to make provision about the Regulator and about the regulation of forensic science; and for connected purposes.
| British Library Board (Power to Borrow) Act 2021 | 2021 c. 15 | 29 April 2021 |
An Act to provide the British Library Board with a power to borrow money.
| Education and Training (Welfare of Children) Act 2021 | 2021 c. 16 | 29 April 2021 |
An Act to impose duties on certain education and training providers in relation to safeguarding and promoting the welfare of children.
| Domestic Abuse Act 2021 | 2021 c. 17 | 29 April 2021 |
An Act to make provision in relation to domestic abuse; to make provision for and in connection with the establishment of a Domestic Abuse Commissioner; to make provision for the granting of measures to assist individuals in certain circumstances to give evidence or otherwise participate in civil proceedings; to prohibit cross-examination in person in family or civil proceedings in certain circumstances; to make further provision about orders under section 91(14) of the Children Act 1989; to provide for an offence of threatening to disclose private sexual photographs and films with intent to cause distress; to provide for an offence of strangulation or suffocation; to make provision about circumstances in which consent to the infliction of harm is not a defence in proceedings for certain violent offences; to make provision about certain violent or sexual offences, and offences involving other abusive behaviour, committed outside the United Kingdom; and for connected purposes.
| Prisons (Substance Testing) Act 2021 | 2021 c. 18 | 29 April 2021 |
An Act to make provision about substance testing in prisons and similar institutions.
| Botulinum Toxin and Cosmetic Fillers (Children) Act 2021 | 2021 c. 19 | 29 April 2021 |
An Act to make provision about the administration to persons under the age of 18 of botulinum toxin and of other substances for cosmetic purposes; and for connected purposes.
| Education (Guidance about Costs of School Uniforms) Act 2021 | 2021 c. 20 | 29 April 2021 |
An Act to make provision for guidance to schools about the costs aspects of school uniform policies.
| Animal Welfare (Sentencing) Act 2021 | 2021 c. 21 | 29 April 2021 |
An Act to make provision about the mode of trial and maximum penalty for certain offences under the Animal Welfare Act 2006.
| Financial Services Act 2021 | 2021 c. 22 | 29 April 2021 |
An Act to make provision about financial services and markets; to make provision about debt respite schemes; to make provision about Help-to-Save accounts; and for connected purposes.
| Overseas Operations (Service Personnel and Veterans) Act 2021 | 2021 c. 23 | 29 April 2021 |
An Act to make provision about legal proceedings in connection with operations of the armed forces outside the British Islands.
| Fire Safety Act 2021 | 2021 c. 24 | 29 April 2021 |
An Act to make provision about the application of the Regulatory Reform (Fire Safety) Order 2005 where a building contains two or more sets of domestic premises; and to confer power to amend that order in future for the purposes of changing the premises to which it applies.
| National Security and Investment Act 2021 | 2021 c. 25 | 29 April 2021 |
An Act to make provision for the making of orders in connection with national security risks arising from the acquisition of control over certain types of entities and assets; and for connected purposes.
