= 2021 State Opening of Parliament =

Start of session of UK Parliament

- Legislative body: Parliament of the United Kingdom
- Meeting place: Palace of Westminster
- Date: 11 May 2021
- Government: Second Johnson ministry

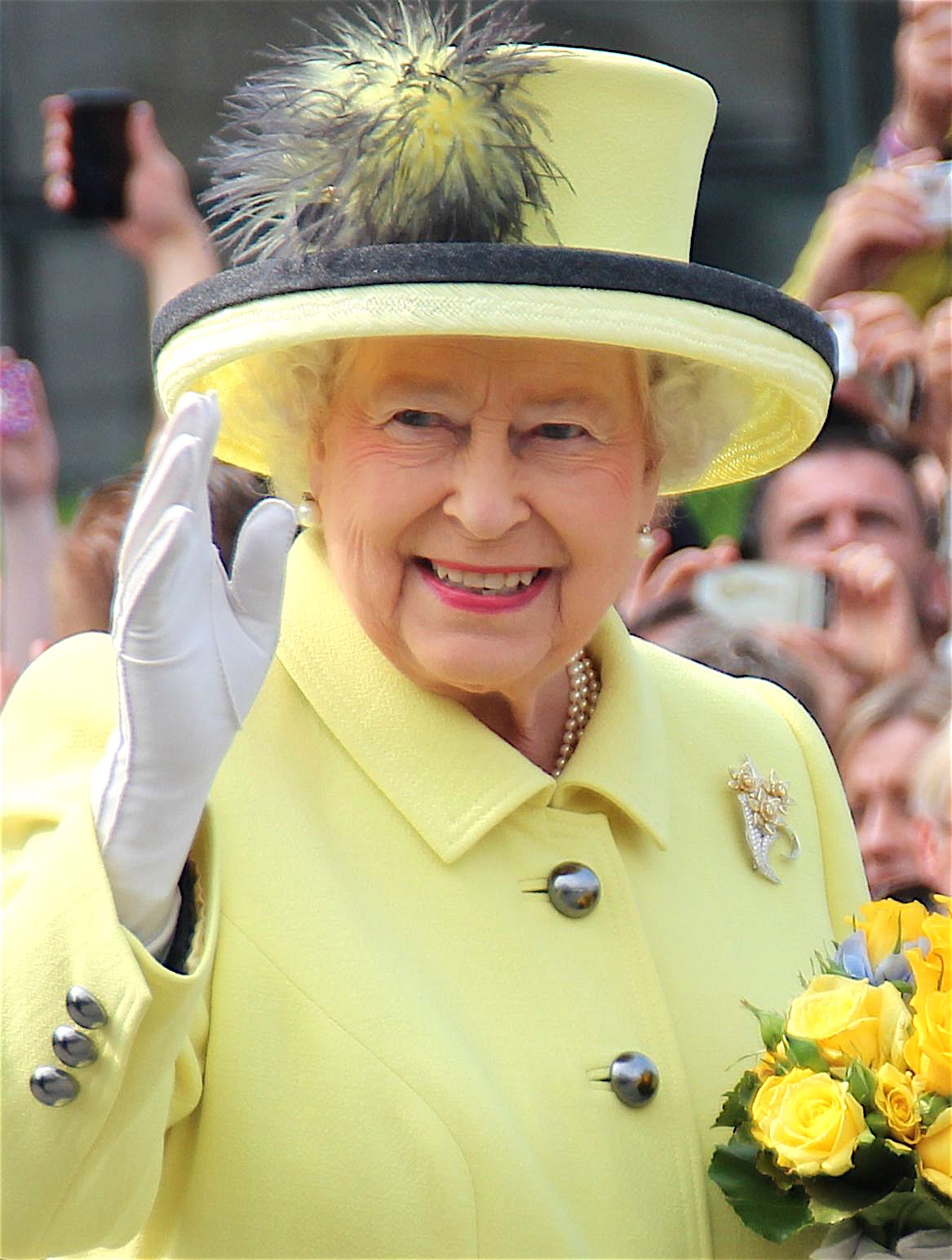
It was the 67th (and final) state opening carried out by Queen Elizabeth II.

A State Opening of Parliament took place on 11 May 2021. Queen Elizabeth II opened the second session of the 58th Parliament with the traditional Queen's Speech. The event was significant as it involved many restrictions due to the COVID-19 pandemic in the United Kingdom.

== Background ==
The parliament was elected at the 2019 general election. The Opening of Parliament was the Queen's first major royal duty since the death of her husband, the Duke of Edinburgh, which occurred one month before. This would be the last state opening the Queen would personally attend prior to her death in September 2022, as the then-Prince of Wales and Duke of Cambridge, acting as Counsellors of State, stood in for the ailing Monarch for the last State Opening of Parliament of her reign in May 2022.

== COVID-19 restrictions ==
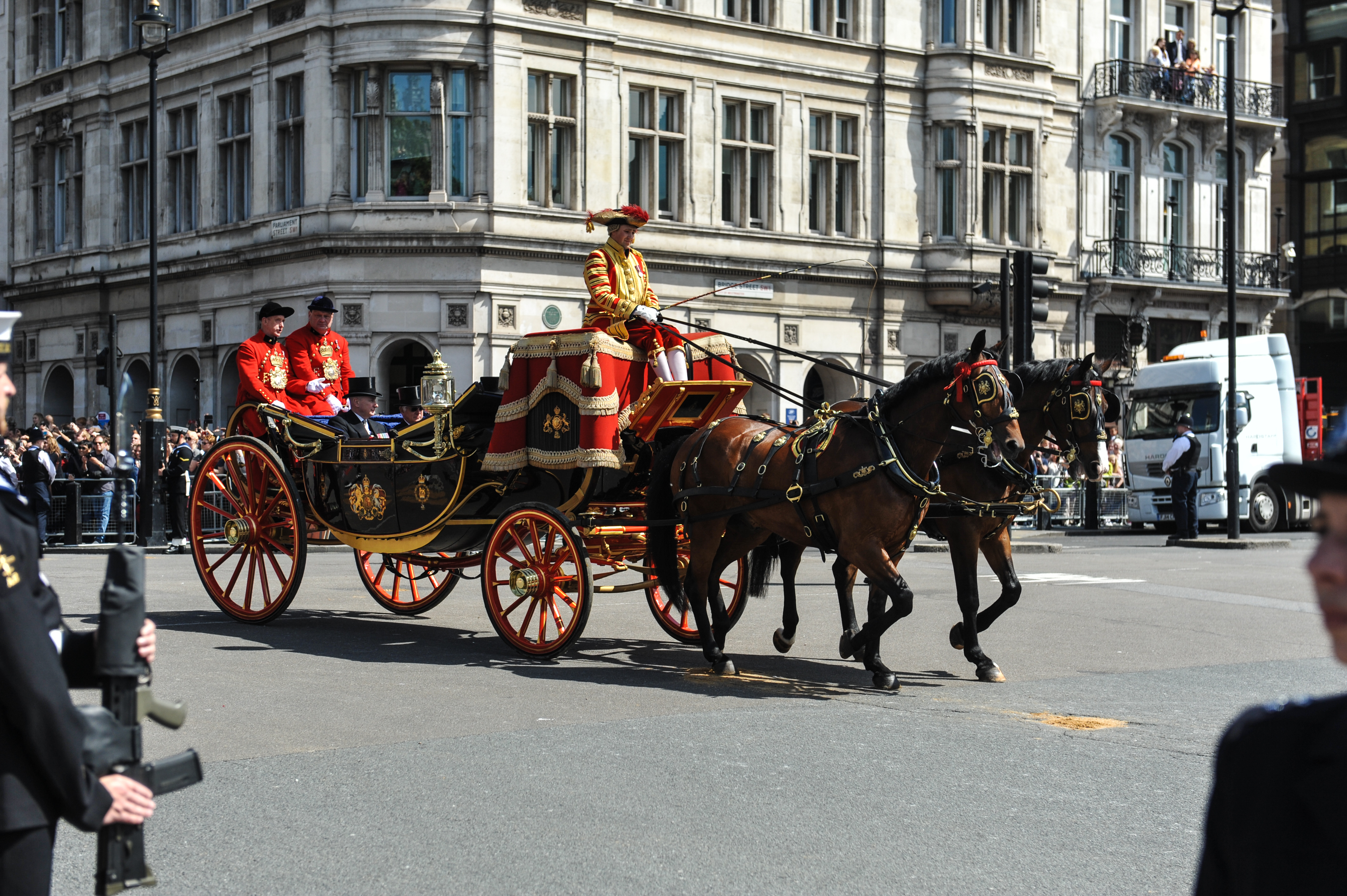
The traditional horse drawn carriage in 2015

The ceremony was different from usual protocol, being the first since the COVID-19 pandemic began. Only 74 people were allowed in the House of Lords when the speech was read, with a further 34 MPs and peers sitting in the Royal Gallery. The Queen travelled from Buckingham Palace in a Range Rover instead of the traditional carriage.

== Substance ==
=== Speculation ===
There were expected to be between 25 and 30 bills mentioned in the speech, including bills related to rent reform and employment. BBC News reported that the speech would include measures on adult social care, Northern Ireland veterans, asylum reform, the English planning system, fixed-term parliaments, and building safety regulations.

=== Announced bills ===
The following new bills were announced in the speech:

- Animal Welfare (Sentience) Bill
- Animal Welfare (Kept Animals) Bill
- Animals Abroad Bill
- Building Safety Bill
- Charities Bill
- Counter-State Threats Bill
- Dissolution and Calling of Parliament Bill
- Dormant Assets Bill
- Electoral Integrity Bill
- Health and Care Bill
- High Speed Rail (Crewe–Manchester) Bill
- Higher Education (Freedom of Speech) Bill
- Judicial Review Bill
- Leasehold Reform (Ground Rent) Bill
- National Insurance Contributions Bill
- Northern Ireland (Ministers, Elections and Petitions of Concern) Bill
- Online Safety Bill
- Planning Bill
- Procurement Bill
- Product Security and Telecommunications Infrastructure Bill
- Skills and Post-16 Education Bill
- Subsidy Control Bill
- Victims Bill

Further legislation will also introduce the government's "New Plan for Immigration" and deal with legacy issues relating to Northern Ireland.

The Dissolution and Calling of Parliament Bill would repeal the Fixed-term Parliaments Act 2011, restoring the power of the monarch to dissolve Parliament and call a new election at the request of the prime minister, while the Electoral Integrity Bill would introduce mandatory photo identification for voters at general elections, as well as granting British nationals who have lived overseas for over 15 years the right to vote. The Judicial Review Bill would allow courts to issue suspended quashing orders, giving the government time to correct errors before a quashing order comes into effect, and abolish the right to judicial review of Upper Tribunal decisions at the High Court of Justice.

The Online Safety Bill would create a new statutory duty of care of online platforms towards their users, obliging them to remove both illegal and "legal but harmful" content, and empower Ofcom to block access to particular websites. In addition, the bill would prohibit social media networks from removing certain forms of user-submitted political content or discriminating against particular political viewpoints.

The Higher Education (Freedom of Speech) Bill would impose requirements for universities and students' unions to protect freedom of speech, allowing speakers to seek compensation for no-platforming, empowering the Office for Students to levy fines on infringing institutions, and creating a new ombudsman charged with monitoring cases of no-platforming and academic dismissals.

=== Carried-over bills ===
In addition, the following bills were carried over from the 2019–21 legislative session:

- Advanced Research and Invention Agency Bill
- Armed Forces Bill
- Environment Bill
- Finance Bill
- Police, Crime, Sentencing and Courts Bill
- Telecommunications (Security) Bill

== Event ==
The Queen travelled from Buckingham Palace to the Palace of Westminster. She was joined by her son Prince Charles and his wife Camilla. The MP Marcus Jones was taken in the opposite direction as 'hostage' for the duration.

The consort's throne was absent from the House of Lords during the event due to COVID-19 restrictions: though the Queen's consort Prince Philip had died on 9 April 2021, the throne was expected to be returned and occupied by Prince Charles at future State Openings.

== Response ==
Members of Parliament debated the speech in the House of Commons afterwards. A debate also took place in the House of Lords. Lord Lebedev made his maiden speech.

On 19 May the motion on the address was passed by a vote of 367–264, with the Democratic Unionist Party supporting the government.

== See also ==
- Parliament of the United Kingdom
- List of acts of the 2nd session of the 58th Parliament of the United Kingdom
- List of acts of the Parliament of the United Kingdom, 2020–present
