= NSIA =

NSIA may refer to:

- National Statistics and Information Authority (Afghanistan)
- National Security and Investment Act 2021 (UK)
- Nigeria Sovereign Investment Authority
- Norwegian Safety Investigation Authority
