= 2010 Virginia ballot measures =

The 2010 Virginia State Elections took place on Election Day, November 2, 2010, the same day as the U.S. House elections in the state. The only statewide elections on the ballot were three constitutional referendums to amend the Virginia State Constitution. Because Virginia state elections are held on off-years, no statewide officers or state legislative elections were held. All referendums were referred to the voters by the Virginia General Assembly.

== Question 1 ==
The amendment asked voters if they would approve or reject a property tax exemption for residents 65 or older or with disabilities that are permanent. It also mandated that homeowners show that they had a tax burden on their property in relation to their income in order to receive such exemptions.

Question 1
Choice	Votes	%
For	1,585,492	75.92
Against	502,828	24.08
Total	2,088,320	100.00
Source: - Official Results

== Question 2 ==
The amendment asked voters of Virginia if they would approve or reject a property tax exemption for an armed forces veteran or their surviving spouse if the veteran had a 100% permanent and total disability related to military service.

Question 2
Choice	Votes	%
For	1,734,109	82.41
Against	370,244	17.59
Total	2,104,353	100.00
Source: - Official Results

== Question 3 ==
The Virginia Revenue Stabilization Fund was first established in 1992 after voters approved a constitutional amendment that mandated its creation. This year's amendment asked voters to further expand the fund. Virginia was one of five states that put a ballot question involving revenue stabilization or rainy day funds on the November 2010 ballot, largely in response to the Great Recession in the United States. Voters were asked the following question:

"Shall Section 8 of Article X of the Constitution of Virginia be amended to increase the permissible size of the Revenue Stabilization Fund (also known as the "rainy day fund") from 10 percent to 15 percent of the Commonwealth's average annual tax revenues derived from income and retail sales taxes for the preceding three fiscal years?"

This amendment appeared to be far more controversial to voters, and passed with a far smaller margin than the other two amendments.

Question 3
Choice	Votes	%
For	1,059,696	51.15
Against	1,011,963	48.85
Total	2,071,659	100.00
Source: - Official Results

Question 3
- November 2, 2010
- Shall Section 8 of Article X of the Constitution of Virginia be amended to increase the permissible size of the Revenue Stabilization Fund (also known as the "rainy day fund") from 10 percent to 15 percent of the Commonwealth's average annual tax revenues derived from income and retail sales taxes for the preceding three fiscal years?

Results
Choice	Votes	%
Yes	1,059,696	51.15%
No	1,011,963	48.85%
Total votes	2,071,659	100.00%
- County and independent city results No—60-70% No—50–60% Yes—50–60% Yes—60–70% Yes—70–80%
