= 2020 Streatham stabbing =

Stabbing attack in Streatham, London

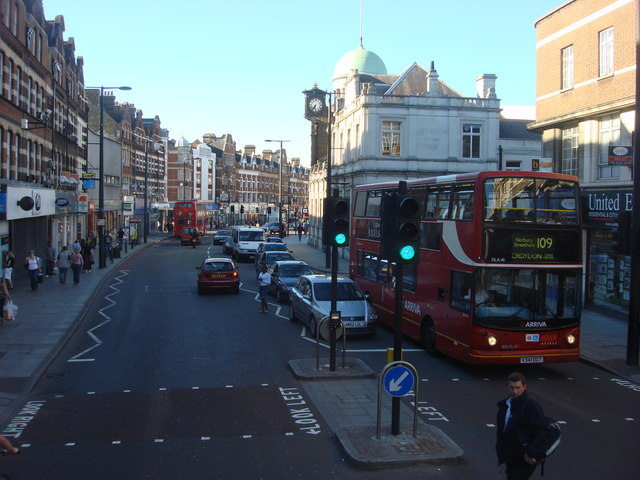
- Streatham High Road (the site of the attack) in 2009
- Location: 51.431433°N 0.129356°W; Streatham, London, England
- Date: 2 February 2020; 14:00 GMT (UTC±0)
- Attack type: Stabbing, terrorism
- Weapons: Knife; Fake suicide vest
- Deaths: 1 (the attacker)
- Injuries: 3 (2 directly, 1 indirectly)
- Assailant: Sudesh Mamoor Faraz Amman
- Motive: Jihadism (Islamic terrorism)

On 2 February 2020, two people were stabbed in Streatham, London, England in what police termed a terrorist incident. The attacker, Sudesh Amman, was shot dead by the police. A nearby woman was slightly injured by broken glass as a result. At the time Amman was under active counter-terrorism surveillance, after having recently being released from prison on licence; he had been convicted in 2018 for disseminating terrorist material. Following the attack, the British government introduced the Terrorist Offenders Bill, a piece of emergency legislation intended to prevent those convicted of terrorist offences from being released early from prison; this bill was approved by Parliament and came into force by the end of the month.

== Incident ==
On 2 February 2020, having left his probation hostel, Amman walked to Streatham High Road.

At about 14:00 GMT (UTC±0), Amman stabbed two people on Streatham High Road in London in what the police described as a terrorist incident. The attacker, who had stolen a knife from a store just before the incident and wore silver canisters strapped to his chest, was chased along Streatham High Road and then shot dead by police outside the doors of a Boots chemist's.

== Victims ==
A man and a woman were stabbed during the attack, and another woman was injured when police shot the attacker. The man in his 40s was taken to hospital and was initially in a life-threatening condition, which subsequently became less serious. A woman in her 50s was also taken to hospital, and was in a stable condition after being stabbed in the back by Amman. The other woman, in her 20s, was injured by glass following the shooting and treated for minor injuries at the scene before being taken to hospital.

== Attacker ==
The attacker was identified as Sudesh Mamoor Faraz Amman. He had been sentenced in 2018 by Judge Mark Lucraft to three years and four months in prison for disseminating terrorist material and collecting information that could be useful to a terrorist. A college student at the time of his arrest, he had shared an al-Qaeda magazine in a family WhatsApp group and told his siblings: "the Islamic State is here to stay". Amman also said to his girlfriend that she should kill her unbelieving parents. The head of the Metropolitan police counter terrorism command said Amman had a "fierce interest in violence and martyrdom" and that "his fascination with dying in the name of terrorism" was evident in a notepad found at his home. At the time of the Streatham incident, he had recently been released from prison. During his 2018 trial, the prosecution stated that Amman "had discussed with his family, friends and girlfriend his strong and often extreme views on jihad, the kuffar, and his desire to carry out a terrorist attack".

Following his release in January 2020, Amman was "under active counter-terrorism surveillance". According to The Guardian, the attacker was "considered to pose a serious risk, and was well known to the counter-terror authorities, he was also the subject of a live investigation".

== Reactions ==
The Prime Minister. Boris Johnson, thanked the emergency services for responding to the incident, and said that his thoughts were "with the injured and all those affected". Mayor of London Sadiq Khan thanked the "police, security and emergency services staff for their swift and courageous response". Home Secretary Priti Patel said "My first thoughts are with the victims, our brave police and emergency services and their families".

On 3 February, the government announced that emergency legislation would be introduced to end the automatic release of prisoners convicted of terrorism from being released after serving half their sentence. Secretary of State for Justice Robert Buckland told the House of Commons that the new law would apply to current and future prisoners. Lord Carlile, a barrister and former independent reviewer of terrorism legislation, suggested the government could face a legal challenge if the new legislation was applied retrospectively. The Terrorist Offenders Bill was presented to parliament on 11 February. On 12 February, the Bill cleared all of the stages required for it to pass through the House of Commons, doing so without the need for a vote. The bill received Royal assent on 26 February, and went into effect, immediately preventing the automatic release of 50 convicted terrorists.

== See also ==
- List of terrorist incidents in London
- List of terrorist incidents in Great Britain
- 2020 Reading stabbings
- List of stabbings
