= Emergency fund =

Money allocated for future unexpected expenses

An emergency fund, also known as a contingency fund, is a personal budget set aside as a financial safety net for future mishaps or unexpected expenses. A critical part of financial planning, it is supposed to ensure one's personal finances are prepared for any emergency so that the risks of becoming dependent on credit, falling into debt, or running out of money in general are reduced if such a situation were to occur.

Emergency funds may be used in the case of job loss, medical emergencies, automobile problems, home appliance repairs and replacements, and unplanned travel expenses.

== Household prevalence ==
In the Federal Reserve's October 2025 Survey of Household Economics and Decisionmaking, 55 percent of U.S. adults said they had set aside enough money in an emergency or rainy-day fund to cover three months of expenses. In the same survey, 63 percent said they would cover a hypothetical $400 emergency expense entirely with cash or its equivalent, while 12 percent said they could not cover the expense by any means.

== See also ==
- Rainy day fund
- Contingency fund
