= 1992 Virginia ballot measures =

The 1992 Virginia State Elections took place on Election Day, November 3, 1992, the same day as the U.S. Presidential and the U.S. House elections in the state. The only statewide elections on the ballot were one constitutional referendum to amend the Virginia State Constitution and three government bond referendums. Because Virginia state elections are held on off-years, no statewide officers or state legislative elections were held. All referendums were referred to the voters by the Virginia General Assembly.

== Question 1 ==
This amendment asked voters to approve the creation of the Virginia Revenue Stabilization Fund. This Fund accumulates money in years when revenue surpluses grow at above-average rates and can be appropriated in future years when revenues fall short of projected forecasts. After this amendment passed, 10 percent of the Commonwealth's average annual tax revenues was devoted to this fund. This was later expanded to 15 percent in 2010.

Question 1
Choice	Votes	%
For	1,568,958	72.63
Against	591,385	27.37
Total	2,160,343	100.00
Source: - Official Results

== Bond Question 1 ==
The Parks and Recreational Facilities Act allows the Commonwealth to sell a maximum of about $95,365,000 dollars in bonds for the purpose of raising funds to pay for capital projects at state-supported parks and recreational facilities.

Bond Question 1
Choice	Votes	%
For	1,466,686	66.99
Against	722,840	33.01
Total	2,189,526	100.00
Source: - Official Results

== Bond Question 2 ==
Voters were asked the following question:

"Shall Chapters 849 and 892, Acts of the General Assembly of 1992, authorizing the issuance of general obligation bonds of the Commonwealth of Virginia In the maximum amount of $45,173,000 pursuant to Article X, Section 9 (b) of the Constitution of Virginia for capital projects for mental health facilities, take effect?"

Bond Question 2
Choice	Votes	%
For	1,414,728	67.61
Against	677,720	32.39
Total	2,092,448	100.00
Source: - Official Results

== Bond Question 3 ==
The Educational Facilities Act allows the Commonwealth to sell a maximum of about $472,406,000 dollars in bonds for the purpose of raising funds to pay for capital projects at state-supported colleges, universities, museums and other educational facilities.

Bond Question 3
Choice	Votes	%
For	1,560,499	73.74
Against	555,624	26.26
Total	2,116,123	100.00
Source: - Official Results
