= List of acts of the Parliament of the United Kingdom from 2020 =

List of 21st century parliament acts

This is a list of acts of the Parliament of the United Kingdom passed in 2020.

Acts passed since 1963 are cited by calendar year, as opposed to the convention used for earlier acts of citing the regnal year(s) in which the relevant parliamentary session was held. Each act passed in a respective year is given a chapter number (abbreviated "c."), denoted by Arabic numerals in the case of public general acts, lowercase Roman numerals in the case of local acts, or italicised Arabic numerals in the case of personal acts. These run as separate series.

29 acts of Parliament were passed in 2020; all were public general acts.

indicates that an act has been transcribed on Wikisource, indicates that an act is available to view at legislation.gov.uk, and indicates the location of the original act in the Parliamentary Archives.

== Public general acts ==
Short title	Citation	Royal assent
Long title
European Union (Withdrawal Agreement) Act 2020	2020 c. 1	23 January 2020
An Act to implement, and make other provision in connection with, the agreement between the United Kingdom and the EU under Article 50(2) of the Treaty on European Union which sets out the arrangements for the United Kingdom's withdrawal from the EU.
Direct Payments to Farmers (Legislative Continuity) Act 2020	2020 c. 2	30 January 2020
An Act to make provision for the incorporation of the Direct Payments Regulation into domestic law; for enabling an increase in the total maximum amount of direct payments under that Regulation; and for connected purposes.
Terrorist Offenders (Restriction of Early Release) Act 2020	2020 c. 3	26 February 2020
An Act to make provision about the release on licence of offenders convicted of terrorist offences or offences with a terrorist connection; and for connected purposes.
Supply and Appropriation (Anticipation and Adjustments) Act 2020	2020 c. 4	16 March 2020
An Act to authorise the use of resources for the years ending with 31 March 2020 and 31 March 2021; to authorise the issue of sums out of the Consolidated Fund for those years; and to appropriate the supply authorised by this Act for the year ending with 31 March 2020.
NHS Funding Act 2020	2020 c. 5	16 March 2020
An Act to make provision regarding the funding of the health service in England in respect of each financial year until the financial year that ends with 31 March 2024.
Contingencies Fund Act 2020	2020 c. 6	25 March 2020
An Act to make provision increasing the maximum capital of the Contingencies Fund for a temporary period.
Coronavirus Act 2020	2020 c. 7	25 March 2020
An Act to make provision in connection with coronavirus; and for connected purposes.
Windrush Compensation Scheme (Expenditure) Act 2020	2020 c. 8	8 June 2020
An Act to provide for the payment out of money provided by Parliament of expenditure incurred by the Secretary of State or a government department under, or in connection with, the Windrush Compensation Scheme.
Sentencing (Pre-consolidation Amendments) Act 2020	2020 c. 9	8 June 2020
An Act to give effect to Law Commission recommendations relating to commencement of enactments relating to sentencing law and to make provision for pre-consolidation amendments of sentencing law.
Birmingham Commonwealth Games Act 2020	2020 c. 10	25 June 2020
An Act to make provision about the Commonwealth Games that are to be held principally in Birmingham in 2022; and for connected purposes.
Divorce, Dissolution and Separation Act 2020	2020 c. 11	25 June 2020
An Act to make in relation to marriage and civil partnership in England and Wales provision about divorce, dissolution and separation; and for connected purposes.
Corporate Insolvency and Governance Act 2020	2020 c. 12	25 June 2020
An Act to make provision about companies and other entities in financial difficulty; and to make temporary changes to the law relating to the governance and regulation of companies and other entities.
Supply and Appropriation (Main Estimates) Act 2020	2020 c. 13	22 July 2020
An Act to authorise the use of resources for the year ending with 31 March 2021; to authorise both the issue of sums out of the Consolidated Fund and the application of income for that year; and to appropriate the supply authorised for that year by this Act and by the Supply and Appropriation (Anticipation and Adjustments) Act 2020. (Note: Supply and Appropriation (Anticipation and Adjustments) Act 2020 (c. 4))
Finance Act 2020	2020 c. 14	22 July 2020
An Act to grant certain duties, to alter other duties, and to amend the law relating to the national debt and the public revenue, and to make further provision in connection with finance.
Stamp Duty Land Tax (Temporary Relief) Act 2020	2020 c. 15	22 July 2020
An Act to make provision to reduce for a temporary period the amount of stamp duty land tax chargeable on the acquisition of residential property.
Business and Planning Act 2020	2020 c. 16	22 July 2020
An Act to make provision relating to the promotion of economic recovery and growth.
Sentencing Act 2020	2020 c. 17	22 October 2020
An Act to consolidate certain enactments relating to sentencing.
Extradition (Provisional Arrest) Act 2020	2020 c. 18	22 October 2020
An Act to create a power of arrest, without warrant, for the purpose of extraditing people for serious offences.
Prisoners (Disclosure of Information About Victims) Act 2020	2020 c. 19	4 November 2020
An Act to require the Parole Board to take into account any failure by a prisoner serving a sentence for unlawful killing or for taking or making an indecent image of a child to disclose information about the victim.
Immigration and Social Security Co-ordination (EU Withdrawal) Act 2020	2020 c. 20	11 November 2020
An Act to make provision to end rights to free movement of persons under retained EU law and to repeal other retained EU law relating to immigration; to confer power to modify retained direct EU legislation relating to social security co-ordination; and for connected purposes.
Agriculture Act 2020	2020 c. 21	11 November 2020
An Act to authorise expenditure for certain agricultural and other purposes; to make provision about direct payments following the United Kingdom's departure from the European Union and about payments in response to exceptional market conditions affecting agricultural markets; to confer power to modify retained direct EU legislation relating to agricultural and rural development payments and public market intervention and private storage aid; to make provision about reports on food security; to make provision about the acquisition and use of information connected with food supply chains; to confer powers to make regulations about the imposition of obligations on business purchasers of agricultural products, marketing standards, organic products and the classification of carcasses; to make provision for reports relating to free trade agreements; to make provision for the recognition of associations of agricultural producers which may benefit from certain exemptions from competition law; to make provision about fertilisers; to make provision about the identification and traceability of animals; to make provision about red meat levy in Great Britain; to make provision about agricultural tenancies; to confer power to make regulations about securing compliance with the WTO Agreement on Agriculture; and for connected purposes.
Fisheries Act 2020	2020 c. 22	23 November 2020
An Act to make provision in relation to fisheries, fishing, aquaculture and marine conservation; to make provision about the functions of the Marine Management Organisation; and for connected purposes.
Social Security (Up-rating of Benefits) Act 2020	2020 c. 23	23 November 2020
An Act to make provision relating to the up-rating of certain social security benefits.
Private International Law (Implementation of Agreements) Act 2020	2020 c. 24	14 December 2020
An Act to implement the Hague Conventions of 1996, 2005 and 2007 and to provide for the implementation of other international agreements on private international law.
Parliamentary Constituencies Act 2020	2020 c. 25	14 December 2020
An Act to make provision about reports of the Boundary Commissions under the Parliamentary Constituencies Act 1986; (Note: Parliamentary Constituencies Act 1986 (c. 56)) to make provision about the number of parliamentary constituencies and other rules for the distribution of seats; and for connected purposes.
Taxation (Post-transition Period) Act 2020	2020 c. 26	17 December 2020
An Act to make provision (including the imposition and regulation of new duties of customs) in connection with goods in Northern Ireland and their movement into or out of Northern Ireland; to make provision amending certain enactments relating to value added tax, excise duty or insurance premium tax; to make provision in connection with the recovery of unlawful state aid in relation to controlled foreign companies; and for connected purposes.
United Kingdom Internal Market Act 2020	2020 c. 27	17 December 2020
An Act to make provision in connection with the internal market for goods and services in the United Kingdom (including provision about the recognition of professional and other qualifications); to make provision in connection with provisions of the Northern Ireland Protocol relating to trade and state aid; to authorise the provision of financial assistance by Ministers of the Crown in connection with economic development, infrastructure, culture, sport and educational or training activities and exchanges; to make regulation of the provision of distortive or harmful subsidies a reserved or excepted matter; and for connected purposes.
Trade (Disclosure of Information) Act 2020	2020 c. 28	17 December 2020
An Act to make provision about the disclosure of information relating to trade.
European Union (Future Relationship) Act 2020	2020 c. 29	31 December 2020
An Act to make provision to implement, and make other provision in connection with, the Trade and Cooperation Agreement; to make further provision in connection with the United Kingdom's future relationship with the EU and its member States; to make related provision about passenger name record data, customs and privileges and immunities; and for connected purposes.

== See also ==
- List of acts of the Parliament of the United Kingdom
