= List of acts of the Parliament of the United Kingdom from 2021 =

This is a list of acts of the Parliament of the United Kingdom passed in 2021.

Acts passed since 1963 are cited by calendar year, as opposed to the convention used for earlier acts of citing the regnal year(s) in which the relevant parliamentary session was held. Each act passed in a respective year is given a chapter number (abbreviated "c."), denoted by Arabic numerals in the case of public general acts, lowercase Roman numerals in the case of local acts, or italicised Arabic numerals in the case of personal acts. These run as separate series.

35 acts of Parliament were passed in 2021; all were public general acts.

indicates that an act has been transcribed on Wikisource, indicates that an act is available to view at legislation.gov.uk, and indicates the location of the original act in the Parliamentary Archives.

== Public general acts ==
Short title	Citation	Royal assent
Long title
Pension Schemes Act 2021	2021 c. 1	11 February 2021
An Act to make provision about pension schemes.
High Speed Rail (West Midlands - Crewe) Act 2021	2021 c. 2	11 February 2021
An Act to make provision for a railway between a junction with Phase One of High Speed 2, near Fradley Wood in Staffordshire, and a junction with the West Coast Main Line near Crewe in Cheshire; and for connected purposes.
Medicines and Medical Devices Act 2021	2021 c. 3	11 February 2021
An Act to make provision about a Commissioner for Patient Safety in relation to human medicines and medical devices; confer power to amend or supplement the law relating to human medicines, veterinary medicines and medical devices; make provision about the enforcement of regulations, and the protection of health and safety, in relation to medical devices; and for connected purposes.
Covert Human Intelligence Sources (Criminal Conduct) Act 2021	2021 c. 4	1 March 2021
An Act to make provision for, and in connection with, the authorisation of criminal conduct in the course of, or otherwise in connection with, the conduct of covert human intelligence sources.
Ministerial and other Maternity Allowances Act 2021	2021 c. 5	1 March 2021
An Act to make provision for payments to or in respect of Ministers and holders of Opposition offices on maternity leave.
Supply and Appropriation (Anticipation and Adjustments) Act 2021	2021 c. 6	15 March 2021
An Act to authorise the use of resources for the years ending with 31 March 2019, 31 March 2020, 31 March 2021 and 31 March 2022; to authorise the issue of sums out of the Consolidated Fund for the years ending 31 March 2020, 31 March 2021 and 31 March 2022; and to appropriate the supply authorised by this Act for the years ending with 31 March 2019, 31 March 2020 and 31 March 2021.
Telecommunications Infrastructure (Leasehold Property) Act 2021	2021 c. 7	15 March 2021
An Act to amend the electronic communications code set out in Schedule 3A to the Communications Act 2003; (Note: Communications Act 2003 (c. 21)) and for connected purposes.
Non-Domestic Rating (Lists) Act 2021	2021 c. 8	15 March 2021
An Act to make provision to change the dates on which non-domestic rating lists must be compiled; and to change the dates by which proposed lists must be sent to billing authorities, the Secretary of State or the Welsh Ministers.
Contingencies Fund Act 2021	2021 c. 9	15 March 2021
An Act to make provision increasing the maximum capital of the Contingencies Fund for a temporary period.
Trade Act 2021	2021 c. 10	29 April 2021
An Act to make provision about international trade agreements; to make provision establishing the Trade Remedies Authority and conferring functions on it; to make provision about the Trade and Agriculture Commission; and to make provision about the collection and disclosure of information relating to trade.
Counter-Terrorism and Sentencing Act 2021	2021 c. 11	29 April 2021
An Act to make provision about the sentencing of offenders convicted of terrorism offences, of offences with a terrorist connection or of certain other offences; to make other provision in relation to terrorism; and for connected purposes.
Air Traffic Management and Unmanned Aircraft Act 2021	2021 c. 12	29 April 2021
An Act to make provision about airspace change proposals, about the licensing regime for air traffic services under Part 1 of the Transport Act 2000 (Note: Transport Act 2000 (c. 38)) and about airport slot allocation, to confer police powers relating to unmanned aircraft and requirements in Air Navigation Orders and to provide for fixed penalties for certain offences relating to unmanned aircraft.
Non-Domestic Rating (Public Lavatories) Act 2021 (repealed)	2021 c. 13	29 April 2021
An Act to confer relief from non-domestic rates for hereditaments in England and Wales that consist wholly or mainly of public lavatories; and for connected purposes. (Repealed by Non-Domestic Rating Act 2023 (c. 53))
Forensic Science Regulator Act 2021	2021 c. 14	29 April 2021
An Act to make provision for the appointment of the Forensic Science Regulator; to make provision about the Regulator and about the regulation of forensic science; and for connected purposes.
British Library Board (Power to Borrow) Act 2021	2021 c. 15	29 April 2021
An Act to provide the British Library Board with a power to borrow money.
Education and Training (Welfare of Children) Act 2021	2021 c. 16	29 April 2021
An Act to impose duties on certain education and training providers in relation to safeguarding and promoting the welfare of children.
Domestic Abuse Act 2021	2021 c. 17	29 April 2021
An Act to make provision in relation to domestic abuse; to make provision for and in connection with the establishment of a Domestic Abuse Commissioner; to make provision for the granting of measures to assist individuals in certain circumstances to give evidence or otherwise participate in civil proceedings; to prohibit cross-examination in person in family or civil proceedings in certain circumstances; to make further provision about orders under section 91(14) of the Children Act 1989; (Note: Children Act 1989 (c. 41)) to provide for an offence of threatening to disclose private sexual photographs and films with intent to cause distress; to provide for an offence of strangulation or suffocation; to make provision about circumstances in which consent to the infliction of harm is not a defence in proceedings for certain violent offences; to make provision about certain violent or sexual offences, and offences involving other abusive behaviour, committed outside the United Kingdom; and for connected purposes.
Prisons (Substance Testing) Act 2021	2021 c. 18	29 April 2021
An Act to make provision about substance testing in prisons and similar institutions.
Botulinum Toxin and Cosmetic Fillers (Children) Act 2021	2021 c. 19	29 April 2021
An Act to make provision about the administration to persons under the age of 18 of botulinum toxin and of other substances for cosmetic purposes; and for connected purposes.
Education (Guidance about Costs of School Uniforms) Act 2021	2021 c. 20	29 April 2021
An Act to make provision for guidance to schools about the costs aspects of school uniform policies.
Animal Welfare (Sentencing) Act 2021	2021 c. 21	29 April 2021
An Act to make provision about the mode of trial and maximum penalty for certain offences under the Animal Welfare Act 2006. (Note: Animal Welfare Act 2006 (c. 45))
Financial Services Act 2021	2021 c. 22	29 April 2021
An Act to make provision about financial services and markets; to make provision about debt respite schemes; to make provision about Help-to-Save accounts; and for connected purposes.
Overseas Operations (Service Personnel and Veterans) Act 2021	2021 c. 23	29 April 2021
An Act to make provision about legal proceedings in connection with operations of the armed forces outside the British Islands.
Fire Safety Act 2021	2021 c. 24	29 April 2021
An Act to make provision about the application of the Regulatory Reform (Fire Safety) Order 2005 (Note: Regulatory Reform (Fire Safety) Order 2005 (SI 2005/1541)) where a building contains two or more sets of domestic premises; and to confer power to amend that order in future for the purposes of changing the premises to which it applies.
National Security and Investment Act 2021	2021 c. 25	29 April 2021
An Act to make provision for the making of orders in connection with national security risks arising from the acquisition of control over certain types of entities and assets; and for connected purposes.
Finance Act 2021	2021 c. 26	10 June 2021
An Act to grant certain duties, to alter other duties, and to amend the law relating to the national debt and the public revenue, and to make further provision in connection with finance.
Supply and Appropriation (Main Estimates) Act 2021	2021 c. 27	19 July 2021
An Act to authorise the use of resources for the year ending with 31 March 2022; to authorise both the issue of sums out of the Consolidated Fund and the application of income for that year; and to appropriate the supply authorised for that year by this Act and by the Supply and Appropriation (Anticipation and Adjustments) Act 2021. (Note: Supply and Appropriation (Anticipation and Adjustments) Act 2021 (c. 6))
Health and Social Care Levy Act 2021 (repealed)	2021 c. 28	20 October 2021
An Act to make provision imposing a tax (to be known as the health and social care levy), the proceeds of which are payable to the Secretary of State towards the cost of health care and social care, on amounts in respect of which national insurance contributions are, or would be if no restriction by reference to pensionable age were applicable, payable; and for connected purposes. (Repealed by Health and Social Care Levy (Repeal) Act 2022 (c. 43))
Compensation (London Capital & Finance plc and Fraud Compensation Fund) Act 2021	2021 c. 29	20 October 2021
An Act to provide for the payment out of money provided by Parliament of expenditure incurred by the Treasury for, or in connection with, the payment of compensation to customers of London Capital & Finance plc; provide for the making of loans to the Board of the Pension Protection Fund for the purposes of its fraud compensation functions; and for connected purposes.
Environment Act 2021	2021 c. 30	9 November 2021
An Act to make provision about targets, plans and policies for improving the natural environment; for statements and reports about environmental protection; for the Office for Environmental Protection; about waste and resource efficiency; about air quality; for the recall of products that fail to meet environmental standards; about water; about nature and biodiversity; for conservation covenants; about the regulation of chemicals; and for connected purposes.
Telecommunications (Security) Act 2021	2021 c. 31	17 November 2021
An Act to make provision about the security of public electronic communications networks and public electronic communications services.
Social Security (Up-rating of Benefits) Act 2021	2021 c. 32	17 November 2021
An Act to make provision relating to the up-rating of certain social security benefits payable in the tax year 2022-23.
Critical Benchmarks (References and Administrators' Liability) Act 2021	2021 c. 33	15 December 2021
An Act to make provision about the meaning of references to Article 23A benchmarks in contracts and other arrangements; and to make provision about the liability of administrators of Article 23A benchmarks.
Rating (Coronavirus) and Directors Disqualification (Dissolved Companies) Act 2021	2021 c. 34	15 December 2021
An Act to make provision about matters attributable to coronavirus that may not be taken account of in making certain determinations for the purposes of non-domestic rating; and to make provision in connection with the disqualification of directors of companies that are dissolved without becoming insolvent.
Armed Forces Act 2021	2021 c. 35	15 December 2021
An Act to continue the Armed Forces Act 2006; (Note: Armed Forces Act 2006 (c. 52)) to amend that Act and other enactments relating to the armed forces; to make provision about service in the reserve forces; to make provision about pardons for certain abolished service offences; to make provision about war pensions; and for connected purposes.

== See also ==
- List of acts of the Parliament of the United Kingdom
