= Victims Bill =

Bill of the UK parliament

The Victims Bill was one of the new laws proposed at the 2021 State Opening of Parliament in the United Kingdom. It is intended to prevent domestic violence.
