= Critical Benchmarks (References and Administrators' Liability) Act 2021 =

Act of the Parliament of the United Kingdom

Critical Benchmarks (References and Administrators' Liability) Act 2021 (Note: Section 4(4).)
- Act of Parliament
- Parliament of the United Kingdom
- Long title: An Act to make provision about the meaning of references to Article 23A benchmarks in contracts and other arrangements; and to make provision about the liability of administrators of Article 23A benchmarks.
- Citation: 2021 c. 33
- Introduced by: John Glen, Economic Secretary to the Treasury (Commons); Lord Agnew of Oulton, Minister of State for Efficiency and Transformation (Lords)
- Territorial extent: England & Wales; Scotland; Northern Ireland; (Note: Section 4(2).)

Dates
- Royal assent: 15 December 2021
- Commencement: 15 December 2021 (Note: Section 4(3).)
Other legislation
Amends	Benchmarks Regulation
Relates to	Financial Services Act 2021

Status: Current legislation

History of passage through Parliament

Text of statute as originally enacted

Revised text of statute as amended

The Critical Benchmarks (References and Administrators' Liability) Act 2021 (c. 33) is an act of the Parliament of the United Kingdom regarding how critical benchmarks should be treated in contracts and the liability of administrators when operating under Financial Services Authority guidelines.

== Background ==
The goal of the legislation was to reduce the scope for uncertainty and litigation due to the withdrawal of the London Interbank Offered Rate.

On 29 September 2021, the Financial Conduct Authority announced the withdrawal of the LIBOR panels for the Japanese yen, Swiss franc and euro.

== Legislative passage ==
The bill was introduced by Theodore Agnew as Minister of State for Efficiency and Transformation.

== Provisions ==
The act allowed for the winding down of a financial services benchmarks - specifically the London Interbank Offered Rate (LIBOR). The only critical benchmark at the time the act was passed was the LIBOR.

== Further developments ==
The majority of LIBOR settings came to an end on 31 December 2021.
