= Streatham High Road =

Shopping street in the London Borough of Lambeth

Coordinates: 51.43357°N 0.12892°W

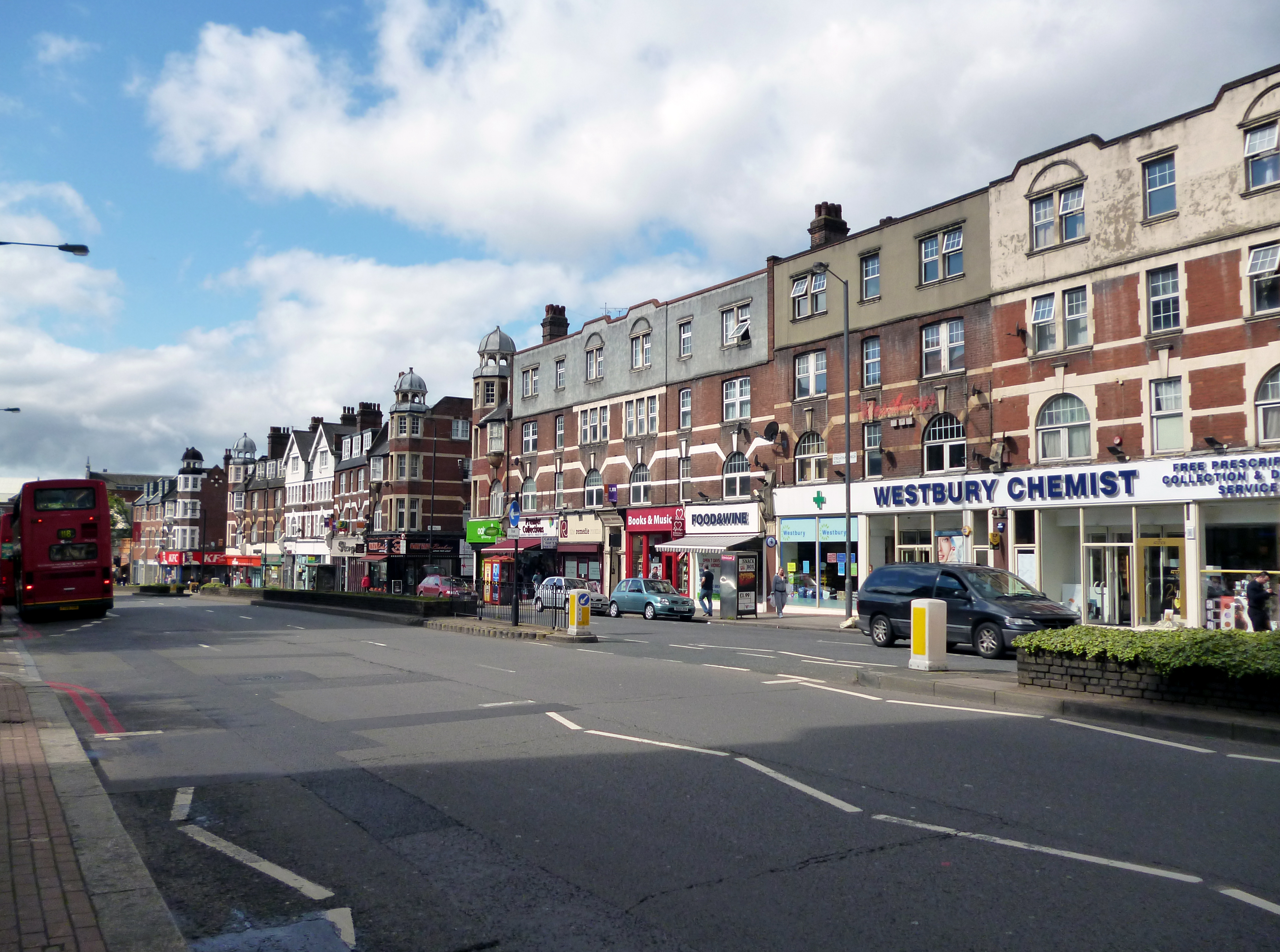
Shops on Streatham High Road

Streatham High Road, some 1.8 miles (2.9 km) in length, is part of the main A23 road from London to Brighton, and is in the London Borough of Lambeth. It begins in the north at Streatham Hill railway station, being an end-on junction with Streatham Hill and continues south to Norbury where the A23 becomes London Road. Because Streatham existed in Saxon times, it is likely the road existed as early as 1068, when it is mentioned in literature.

== "Britain's Worst Street" ==
In 2002 it was voted, in a contentious BBC/Commission for Architecture and the Built Environment poll, to be Britain's Worst Street – largely due to its traffic problems, and a generally poor ambience (run-down shopfronts, damaged pavements).

Even before this report had appeared, a plan was being formulated by Transport for London Street Management (who are legally responsible for the road and pavement maintenance, signage and street furniture) and the London Borough of Lambeth's Highways and Streatham Town Centre Management teams to improve Streatham High Road.

This sets out to "promote the needs of pedestrians, shoppers, cyclists and public transport before the needs of traffic on the A23".

The first phase was implemented in 2004–05, with new lighting and street furniture. Lambeth is also funding a shop front improvement scheme.

== The road ==
After 0.6 mile (0.96 km) there is a large junction complex, where Tooting Bec Gardens (A214) and Mitcham Lane (A216) join the A23. Following that point the road is relatively straight: it follows the line of the London to Brighton Way Roman road. On the east is Streatham Common; and at the end of the High Road is Norbury Park. Here the final small section is within the London Borough of Croydon.
