= Contingencies Fund Act 2021 =

Act of the Parliament of the United Kingdom

Contingencies Fund Act 2021 (Note: Section 2.)
- Act of Parliament
- Parliament of the United Kingdom
- Long title: An Act to make provision increasing the maximum capital of the Contingencies Fund for a temporary period.
- Citation: 2021 c. 9
- Introduced by: Rishi Sunak, Chancellor of the Exchequer (Commons); Lord Agnew of Oulton, Minister of State for Efficiency and Transformation (Lords)
- Territorial extent: United Kingdom

Dates
- Royal assent: 15 March 2021
- Commencement: 15 March 2021 (Note: The Acts of Parliament (Commencement) Act 1793.)
- Expired: 1 April 2022
Other legislation
Amends	Contingencies Fund Act 1974
Relates to	Contingencies Fund Act 2020

Status: Expired

History of passage through Parliament

Text of statute as originally enacted

Revised text of statute as amended

The Contingencies Fund Act 2021 (c. 9) is an act of the Parliament of the United Kingdom which allowed for a temporary increase in the maximum capital of the United Kingdom's contingency fund from 2%, as set out in Section 1 of the Contingencies Fund Act 1974, to 12%. It was introduced by Chancellor of the Exchequer Rishi Sunak in response to the ongoing effects of the COVID-19 pandemic.

== Background ==
The Contingencies Fund was established in 1862 by HM Treasury, and allows governmental departments to access cash advances when money for urgent matters is likely to achieve parliamentary approval, but is needed quickly. Usually, the Contingencies Fund Act 1974 requires that the permanent capital of the fund not exceed 2% of the authorised supply expenditure of the previous financial year.

Because of the effects of the coronavirus pandemic, the Contingencies Fund Act 2020 increased the fund's limit from 2% to 50% but was due to expire on 1 April 2021; this legislation provides an extension to the fund limit increase.

== Passage through Parliament ==
The bill was introduced in the Commons for its first reading on 9 March 2021. It had its second and third readings on 11 March, and was passed to the Lords for its first reading the same day. The bill passed all its remaining readings on 12 March and was given royal assent on 15 March.

== Provisions ==
The act's sole provision was a temporary increase to the contingency fund limit set out in the Contingencies Fund Act 1974 from 2% to 12% (increasing the fund from £17.5 billion to £105 billion). The increase automatically expires on 1 April 2022.
