= Contingencies Fund Act 2020 =

United Kingdom legislation

- Act of Parliament
- Parliament of the United Kingdom
- Long title: An Act to make provision increasing the maximum capital of the Contingencies Fund for a temporary period.
- Citation: 2020 c. 6
- Introduced by: Rishi Sunak, Chancellor of the Exchequer (Commons); Earl of Courtown, Captain of the Yeomen of the Guard (Lords)

Dates
- Royal assent: 25 March 2020
- Commencement: 25 March 2020
- Repealed: 1 April 2021

Other legislation
- Amends: Contingencies Fund Act 1974
- Relates to: Miscellaneous Financial Provisions Act 1946; Coronavirus Act 2020

History of passage through Parliament

Text of statute as originally enacted

Revised text of statute as amended

The Contingencies Fund Act 2020 (c. 6) is an act of the Parliament of the United Kingdom that was created to increase the maximum capital of the United Kingdom's contingency fund from 2%, as set out in Section 1 of the Contingencies Fund Act 1974, to 50%. It was introduced by Chancellor of the Exchequer Rishi Sunak in response to the COVID-19 pandemic.

== Background ==
The Contingencies Fund was established in 1862 by HM Treasury. It originally consisted of a fixed amount of capital which was increased over time and by 1945 had reached £1.5 million. Before this legislation, the Contingencies Fund Act 1974 required that the permanent capital of the fund not exceed 2% of the authorised supply expenditure of the previous financial year. The fund provides cash loans to government departments.

Due to the COVID-19 outbreak, this legislation raises the limit to 50%. This allowed government departments to be funded for extra spending prior to the next set of spending estimates coming before Parliament. Once the spending is approved the contingency fund would be repaid.

== Passage through Parliament ==
The bill was introduced in the Commons on 24 March 2020 and passed all stages in one day.

Shadow Chancellor of the Exchequer John McDonnell announced in the Second Reading debate that Labour would support the bill. In the same debate, Sir Ed Davey announced that the Liberal Democrats would also be supporting the bill.

The bill was nodded through all stages in both the Commons and the Lords without division.

== Provisions ==
=== Section 1 ===
Increases the limit from 2% to 50%, automatically expiring on 1 April 2021.

== Expiry and replacement ==
Though the Act was set to automatically expire, replacement legislation was introduced to Parliament in March 2021. The Contingencies Fund Act 2021 extended the limit increase for another year, but lowered it to 12%.
