= Parliamentary Constituencies Act 2020 =

Act of the Parliament of the United Kingdom

Parliamentary Constituencies Act 2020 (Note: Section 14(3).)
- Act of Parliament
- Parliament of the United Kingdom
- Long title: An Act to make provision about reports of the Boundary Commissions under the Parliamentary Constituencies Act 1986; to make provision about the number of parliamentary constituencies and other rules for the distribution of seats; and for connected purposes
- Citation: 2020 c. 25
- Introduced by: Chloe Smith, Minister of State for the Constitution and Devolution (Commons); Lord True, Minister of State for the Cabinet Office (Lords)
- Territorial extent: England and Wales; Scotland; Northern Ireland; (Note: Section 14(1).)

Dates
- Royal assent: 14 December 2020
- Commencement: 14 December 2020 (Note: Section 14(2).)
Other legislation
Amends	Parliamentary Constituencies Act 1986; Boundary Commissions Act 1992; Northern Ireland Act 1998; Parliamentary Voting System and Constituencies Act 2011; Electoral Registration and Administration Act 2013

Status: Current legislation

History of passage through Parliament

Text of statute as originally enacted

Revised text of statute as amended

The Parliamentary Constituencies Act 2020 (c. 25) is an act of the Parliament of the United Kingdom. It amends the regulations underpinning the parliamentary boundary review process as set out under the Parliamentary Constituencies Act 1986 and previously amended by the Northern Ireland Act 1998, Boundary Commissions Act 1992 and Parliamentary Voting System and Constituencies Act 2011.

A bill was introduced on 19 May 2020 to reflect a written statement, entitled Strengthening Democracy, from the Minister of State for the Cabinet Office, Chloe Smith, on 24 March 2020. It received its second reading on 2 June 2020. The act received royal assent on 14 December 2020.

== Summary of provisions ==
The main provisions of the act are as follows:

Section 1 – Reports of the Boundary Commissions
Each Boundary Commission must submit a report:
1. before 1 July 2023,
2. before 1 October 2031, and
3. before 1 October of every eighth year after that.
Section 2 – Orders in Council giving effect to reports
Orders in Council giving effect to the reports to be automatically passed. The Orders must be made within four months of the reports being laid before Parliament, "unless there are exceptional circumstances".
Section 3 – Modifications of recommendations in reports
A Boundary Commission may submit modifications to its report after it has been submitted but before an Order in Council has been drafted.
Section 4 – Publicity and consultation
This section changes the timings of various stages in the publicity and consultation procedures.
Section 5 – Number of parliamentary constituencies
The number of constituencies remains at 650. Previously, the number was to be reduced to 600.
Section 6 – Taking account of local government boundaries
This amends the factors a Commission may take into account to include local government boundaries which are prospective on the "review date", as opposed to just being effective. Prospective local government boundaries are those which have been specified by legislation, but have not yet become effective.
Section 7 – Protected constituencies
This adds Ynys Môn (defined as the area of the Isle of Anglesey County Council) as a protected constituency.
Section 8 – Registers used to determine the "electorate" in relation to the 2023 reports
For the 2023 reports, the "electorate" calculations were to use the electoral registers published on 2 March 2020 (rather than 1 December 2020). This amendment was specifically inserted, partly because of the shorter time-frame for submitting the reports, but primarily because of concerns over collecting the data during the COVID-19 pandemic.
Section 9 – Alteration of the review date in relation to the 2023 reports
For the 2023 reports, the "review date" was specified as 1 December 2020, rather than 2 years and 10 months before the report date.
Section 10 – Removal of duty to implement etc. in relation to current reports
This section formally removes the duty to implement the previous reviews which had been submitted in September 2018.
