= Telecommunications (Security) Act 2021 =

Act of the Parliament of the United Kingdom

Telecommunications (Security) Act 2021 (Note: Section 29.)
- Act of Parliament
- Parliament of the United Kingdom
- Long title: An Act to make provision about the security of public electronic communications networks and public electronic communications services.
- Citation: 2021 c. 31
- Territorial extent: England and Wales; Scotland; Northern Ireland; (Note: Section 27.)

Dates
- Royal assent: 17 November 2021
- Commencement: 17 November 2021 (in part); 1 October 2022 (rest of act); (Note: Section 28. The Telecommunications (Security) Act 2021 (Commencement) Regulations 2022 (SI 2022/931).)
Other legislation
Amends	Communications Act 2003

Status: Current legislation

Text of statute as originally enacted

Revised text of statute as amended

The Telecommunications (Security) Act 2021 (c. 31) is an act of the Parliament of the United Kingdom.

The act builds upon and strengthens the Communications Act 2003, in particular the role of Ofcom, the United Kingdom's Office for Communication, in regards of its role in policing the security of telecommunications and telecom providers. The act requires the provider of a telecommunications network to ensure that they identify, prepare, and reduce the risk of security compromises.

The act provides the government with "new national security powers" and introduces a "duty owed to every person who may be affected" by a security breach.

In November 2020, the government published its "5G Supply Chain Diversity Strategy" It pledged to "introduce a new, robust security framework" for telecommunications suppliers, enhance security powers for OfCom, and place decisions on "high risk vendors" in statutory terms.

The bill, when introduced, represented "a watershed moment in the development of the UK's response to cyber-security threats." though was also called "narrowly focused".
