= Terrorist Offenders (Restriction of Early Release) Act 2020 =

Law restricting the early release of convicted terrorists in the UK

Terrorist Offenders (Restriction of Early Release) Act 2020 (Note: Section 10(6).)
- Act of Parliament
- Parliament of the United Kingdom
- Long title: An Act to make provision about the release on licence of offenders convicted of terrorist offences or offences with a terrorist connection; and for connected purposes.
- Citation: 2020 c. 3
- Introduced by: Robert Buckland MP, Secretary of State for Justice (Commons); Lord Keen of Elie, Advocate General for Scotland (Lords)
- Territorial extent: England & Wales; Scotland; (Note: Section 10(1)–(3).)

Dates
- Royal assent: 26 February 2020
- Commencement: 26 February 2020 (Note: Section 10(4).)
Other legislation
Amends	Prisoners and Criminal Proceedings (Scotland) Act 1993; Powers of Criminal Courts (Sentencing) Act 2000; Criminal Justice Act 2003; Legal Aid, Sentencing and Punishment of Offenders Act 2012
Amended by	Sentencing Act 2020; Counter-Terrorism and Sentencing Act 2021; Sentencing Act 2026

Status: Amended

History of passage through Parliament

Text of statute as originally enacted

Revised text of statute as amended

The Terrorist Offenders (Restriction of Early Release) Act 2020 (c. 3) is an act of the Parliament of the United Kingdom that makes legal provision for ending the practice of releasing individuals convicted of terrorism offences from prison after they have served half of their custodial sentence. The original bill was introduced on 11 February 2020, a week after the Streatham stabbing in south London, the perpetrator of which had been released from prison ten days before the incident. The legislation applies to those convicted of terrorism offences in England, Scotland and Wales. On 12 February, the bill was introduced as emergency legislation, and cleared all of the stages required for it to pass through the House of Commons on the same day, doing so without the need for a vote. On 26 February, the act received assent and went into effect, immediately preventing the automatic release of 50 convicted terrorists.

On 12 February, former Prime Minister Theresa May voiced concerns about the rehabilitation of such offenders, saying that although the government is "right" to address the early release issue, "terrorist offenders will still be released at some point. That is why the issue of rehabilitation, the work that is done both in prison and when they are out of prison is so important".
