= Direct Payments to Farmers (Legislative Continuity) Act 2020 =

Law relating to payments to UK farmers for 2020

- Act of Parliament
- Parliament of the United Kingdom
- Long title: An Act to make provision for the incorporation of the Direct Payments Regulation into domestic law; for enabling an increase in the total maximum amount of direct payments under that Regulation; and for connected purposes.
- Citation: 2020 c. 2
- Introduced by: Theresa Villiers, Secretary of State for Environment, Food and Rural Affairs (Commons); Lord Gardiner of Kimble, Parliamentary Under-Secretary of State for Rural Affairs and Biosecurity (Lords)
- Territorial extent: United Kingdom

Dates
- Royal assent: 30 January 2020
- Commencement: 30 January 2020 (other than section 5)

Status: Current legislation

History of passage through Parliament

Text of statute as originally enacted

Revised text of statute as amended

The Direct Payments to Farmers (Legislative Continuity) Act 2020 (c. 2) is an act of the Parliament of the United Kingdom that makes provision for the continuation of the making farming subsidies to UK farmers. The act provided for the direct payment schemes under the EU Common Agricultural Policy to become part of domestic law on the date of the UK's exit from the EU.

The act maintained the same funding to the devolved governments for direct payments for 2020 as for 2019.

At the time of the introduction of the legislation the government confirmed its intention to provided for a new system for farm subsidies following 2020 moving away from direct payments to a payment system based on the "public goods" produced by farmers. Such changes were introduced to parliament in the Agriculture Bill 2019-21.

== See also ==
- Agriculture in the United Kingdom
- Common Agricultural Policy
- Single Farm Payment
