= British Library Board (Power to Borrow) Act 2021 =

Act of the Parliament of the United Kingdom

British Library Board (Power to Borrow) Act 2021 (Note: Section 2(3).)
- Act of Parliament
- Parliament of the United Kingdom
- Long title: An Act to provide the British Library Board with a power to borrow money.
- Citation: 2021 c. 15
- Introduced by: Bim Afolami (Commons); Lord Vaizey of Didcot (Lords)
- Territorial extent: England and Wales; Scotland; Northern Ireland; (Note: Section 2(1).)

Dates
- Royal assent: 29 April 2021
- Commencement: 29 June 2021 (Note: Section 2(2).)
Other legislation
Amends	British Library Act 1972

Status: Current legislation

History of passage through Parliament

Text of statute as originally enacted

Revised text of statute as amended

The British Library Board (Power to Borrow) Act 2021 (c. 15) is an act of the Parliament of the United Kingdom. The act allows the board of the British Library (which is a non-departmental public body) to borrow money.

== Provisions ==
The provisions of the act are:

- The amendment of the British Library Act 1972 to remove a clause which prohibited the Library's board from being able to borrow money.

== Passage ==
The act was introduced in the House of Commons as a private member's bill by Bim Afolami, the Conservative MP for Hitchin and Harpenden, in February 2020. It had its second reading in March and was passed to the committee stage by September. The bill had its third reading on 12 March 2021, passing to the House of Lords the same day. It had its second reading in the Lords on 19 March and its third on 26 April, with the need for committee stage being discharged. Its final reading was on 26 April and it gained royal assent on 29 April 2021.

== See also ==
- Private Members' Bills in the Parliament of the United Kingdom
