= NHS Funding Act 2020 =

- Act of Parliament
- Parliament of the United Kingdom
- Long title: An Act to make provision regarding the funding of the health service in England in respect of each financial year until the financial year that ends with 31 March 2024.
- Citation: 2020 c. 5
- Introduced by: Matt Hancock, Secretary of State for Health and Social Care (Commons); Baroness Blackwood of North Oxford, Parliamentary Under-Secretary of State for Life Science (Lords)
- Territorial extent: England & Wales

Dates
- Royal assent: 16 March 2020
- Commencement: 16 March 2020
- Repealed: 31 March 2024

Other legislation
- Relates to: National Health Service Act 2006; Health and Social Care Act 2012

Status: Expired

History of passage through Parliament

Text of statute as originally enacted

Revised text of statute as amended

The NHS Funding Act 2020 (c. 5) is an act of the Parliament of the United Kingdom that sets out the funding for NHS England from 2021 to 2024 that the Secretary of State for Health and Social Care must allot to the respective trusts. This form part of the Government's NHS long-term plan and puts the Chancellor of the Exchequer under a "legal duty" to ensure this money, at a minimum, is spent on the NHS.

== Provisions ==
=== Section 1 - Funding Settlement for the Health Service in England ===
The Secretary of State for Health and Social Care must "allot an amount that is at least the amount specified" in the table below:

Financial Year	Amount
Ending with 31 March 2021	£127,007,000,000
Ending with 31 March 2022	£133,283,000,000
Ending with 31 March 2023	£139,990,000,000
Ending with 31 March 2024	£148,467,000,000

=== Section 2 ===
This act extended to England and Wales. It came into force on the day on which it was passed and expired at the end of 31 March 2024.
