= List of acts of the 2nd session of the 58th Parliament of the United Kingdom =

This is a list of acts of the 2nd session of the 58th Parliament of the United Kingdom, which ran from 11 May 2021 until 28 April 2022.

Acts passed since 1963 are cited by calendar year, as opposed to the convention used for earlier acts of citing the regnal year(s) in which the relevant parliamentary session was held. Each act passed in a respective year is given a chapter number (abbreviated "c."), denoted by Arabic numerals in the case of public general acts, lowercase Roman numerals in the case of local acts, or italicised Arabic numerals in the case of personal acts. These run as separate series.

49 acts of Parliament were passed by the 58th Parliament in its 2nd session: 47 public general acts and 2 local acts.

indicates that an act is available to view at legislation.gov.uk, and indicates the location of the original act in the Parliamentary Archives.

== Public general acts ==
{{legislationuk|act |- | {{|Finance Act 2021|public|26|10-06-2021|maintained=y|archived=n|An Act to grant certain duties, to alter other duties, and to amend the law relating to the national debt and the public revenue, and to make further provision in connection with finance.}} |- | {{|Supply and Appropriation (Main Estimates) Act 2021|public|27|19-07-2021|maintained=y|archived=n|An Act to authorise the use of resources for the year ending with 31 March 2022; to authorise both the issue of sums out of the Consolidated Fund and the application of income for that year; and to appropriate the supply authorised for that year by this Act and by the Supply and Appropriation (Anticipation and Adjustments) Act 2021.}} |- | {{|Health and Social Care Levy Act 2021|public|28|20-10-2021|maintained=y|archived=n|An Act to make provision imposing a tax (to be known as the health and social care levy), the proceeds of which are payable to the Secretary of State towards the cost of health care and social care, on amounts in respect of which national insurance contributions are, or would be if no restriction by reference to pensionable age were applicable, payable; and for connected purposes.}} |- | {{|Compensation (London Capital & Finance plc and Fraud Compensation Fund) Act 2021|public|29|20-10-2021|maintained=y|archived=n|An Act to provide for the payment out of money provided by Parliament of expenditure incurred by the Treasury for, or in connection with, the payment of compensation to customers of London Capital & Finance plc; provide for the making of loans to the Board of the Pension Protection Fund for the purposes of its fraud compensation functions; and for connected purposes.}} |- | {{|Environment Act 2021|public|30|09-11-2021|maintained=y|archived=n|An Act to make provision about targets, plans and policies for improving the natural environment; for statements and reports about environmental protection; for the Office for Environmental Protection; about waste and resource efficiency; about air quality; for the recall of products that fail to meet environmental standards; about water; about nature and biodiversity; for conservation covenants; about the regulation of chemicals; and for connected purposes.}} |- | {{|Telecommunications (Security) Act 2021|public|31|17-11-2021|maintained=y|archived=n|An Act to make provision about the security of public electronic communications networks and public electronic communications services.}} |- | {{|Social Security (Up-rating of Benefits) Act 2021|public|32|17-11-2021|maintained=y|archived=n|An Act to make provision relating to the up-rating of certain social security benefits payable in the tax year 2022-23.}} |- | {{|Critical Benchmarks (References and Administrators' Liability) Act 2021|public|33|15-12-2021|maintained=y|archived=n|An Act to make provision about the meaning of references to Article 23A benchmarks in contracts and other arrangements; and to make provision about the liability of administrators of Article 23A benchmarks.}} |- | {{|Rating (Coronavirus) and Directors Disqualification (Dissolved Companies) Act 2021|public|34|15-12-2021|maintained=y|archived=n|An Act to make provision about matters attributable to coronavirus that may not be taken account of in making certain determinations for the purposes of non-domestic rating; and to make provision in connection with the disqualification of directors of companies that are dissolved without becoming insolvent.}} |- | {{|Armed Forces Act 2021|public|35|15-12-2021|maintained=y|archived=n|An Act to continue the Armed Forces Act 2006; to amend that Act and other enactments relating to the armed forces; to make provision about service in the reserve forces; to make provision about pardons for certain abolished service offences; to make provision about war pensions; and for connected purposes.}} |- | {{|Leasehold Reform (Ground Rent) Act 2022|public|1|08-02-2022|maintained=y|archived=n|An Act to make provision about the rent payable under long leases of dwellings; and for connected purposes.}} |- | {{|Northern Ireland (Ministers, Elections and Petitions of Concern) Act 2022|public|2|08-02-2022|maintained=y|archived=n|An Act to make provision about Ministerial appointments, extraordinary Assembly elections, the Ministerial Code of Conduct and petitions of concern in Northern Ireland.}} |- | {{|Finance Act 2022|public|3|24-02-2022|maintained=y|archived=n|An Act to grant certain duties, to alter other duties, and to amend the law relating to the national debt and the public revenue, and to make further provision in connection with finance.}} |- | {{|Advanced Research and Invention Agency Act 2022|public|4|24-02-2022|maintained=y|archived=n|An Act to make provision for and in connection with the establishment of the Advanced Research and Invention Agency.}} |- | {{|Dormant Assets Act 2022|public|5|24-02-2022|maintained=y|archived=n|An Act to make provision for and in connection with an expanded dormant assets scheme; to confer power to further expand the scope of that scheme; to amend the Dormant Bank and Building Society Accounts Act 2008; to enable an authorised reclaim fund to accept transfers of certain unwanted assets; and for connected purposes.}} |- | {{|Charities Act 2022|public|6|24-02-2022|maintained=y|archived=n|An Act to amend the Charities Act 2011 and the Universities and College Estates Act 1925; and for connected purposes.}} |- | {{|Public Service Pensions and Judicial Offices Act 2022|public|7|10-03-2022|maintained=y|archived=n|An Act to make provision about public service pension schemes, including retrospective provision to rectify unlawful discrimination in the way in which existing schemes were restricted under the Public Service Pensions Act 2013 and corresponding Northern Ireland legislation; to make provision for the establishment of new public pension schemes for members of occupational pension schemes of bodies that were brought into public ownership under the Banking (Special Provisions) Act 2008; to make provision about the remuneration and the date of retirement of holders of certain judicial offices; to make provision about judicial service after retirement; and for connected purposes.}} |- | {{|Supply and Appropriation (Anticipation and Adjustments) Act 2022|public|8|15-03-2022|maintained=y|archived=n|An Act to authorise the use of resources for the years ending with 31 March 2021, 31 March 2022 and 31 March 2023; to authorise the issue of sums out of the Consolidated Fund for those years; and to appropriate the supply authorised by this Act for the years ending with 31 March 2021 and 31 March 2022.}} |- | {{|National Insurance Contributions Act 2022|public|9|15-03-2022|maintained=y|archived=n|An Act to make provision in relation to national insurance contributions.}} |- | {{|Economic Crime (Transparency and Enforcement) Act 2022|public|10|15-03-2022|maintained=y|archived=n|An Act to set up a register of overseas entities and their beneficial owners and require overseas entities who own land to register in certain circumstances; to make provision about unexplained wealth orders; and to make provision about sanctions.}} |- | {{|Dissolution and Calling of Parliament Act 2022|public|11|24-03-2022|maintained=y|archived=n|An Act to make provision about the dissolution and calling of Parliament, including provision for the repeal of the Fixed-term Parliaments Act 2011; and for connected purposes.}} |- | {{|Commercial Rent (Coronavirus) Act 2022|public|12|24-03-2022|maintained=y|archived=n|An Act to make provision enabling relief from payment of certain rent debts under business tenancies adversely affected by coronavirus to be available through arbitration; and for connected purposes.}} |- | {{|Education (Careers Guidance in Schools) Act 2022|public|13|31-03-2022|maintained=y|archived=n|An Act to extend the duty to provide careers guidance in schools.}} |- | {{|Taxis and Private Hire Vehicles (Safeguarding and Road Safety) Act 2022|public|14|31-03-2022|maintained=y|archived=n|An Act to make provision about licensing in relation to taxis and private hire vehicles for purposes relating to the safeguarding of passengers and road safety; and for connected purposes.}} |- | {{|Nuclear Energy (Financing) Act 2022|public|15|31-03-2022|maintained=y|archived=n|An Act to make provision for the implementation of a regulated asset base model for nuclear energy generation projects; for revenue collection for the purposes of that model; for a special administration regime for licensees subject to that model; and about the circumstances in which bodies corporate are not associated with site operators for the purposes of programmes relating to funding the decommissioning of nuclear sites.}} |- | {{|National Insurance Contributions (Increase of Thresholds) Act 2022|public|16|31-03-2022|maintained=y|archived=n|An Act to make provision for and in connection with increasing the thresholds at which primary Class 1 contributions, Class 2 contributions and Class 4 contributions become payable.}} |- | {{|Local Government (Disqualification) Act 2022|public|17|28-04-2022|maintained=y|archived=n|An Act to make provision about the grounds on which a person is disqualified from being elected to, or holding, certain positions in local government in England.}} |- | {{|Down Syndrome Act 2022|public|18|28-04-2022|maintained=y|archived=n|An Act to make provision about meeting the needs of persons with Down syndrome; and for connected purposes.}} |- | {{|Animals (Penalty Notices) Act 2022|public|19|28-04-2022|maintained=y|archived=n|An Act to make provision for and in connection with the giving of penalty notices for certain offences relating to animals and animal products.}} |- | {{|Professional Qualifications Act 2022|public|20|28-04-2022|maintained=y|archived=n|An Act to make provision relating to entitlement to practise certain professions, occupations and trades; and for connected purposes.}} |- | {{|Skills and Post-16 Education Act 2022|public|21|28-04-2022|maintained=y|archived=n|An Act to make provision about local skills improvement plans; to make provision relating to further education; to make provision about functions of the Institute for Apprenticeships and Technical Education and relating to technical education qualifications and apprenticeships; to make provision about student finance and fees; to make provision about assessments and publication of certain matters by the Office for Students; to make provision about the funding of certain post-16 education or training providers; to create offences relating to completing assignments on behalf of students; to make provision about designating 16 to 19 Academies as having a religious character; and for connected purposes.}} |- | {{|Animal Welfare (Sentience) Act 2022|public|22|28-04-2022|maintained=y|archived=n|An Act to make provision for an Animal Sentience Committee with functions relating to the effect of government policy on the welfare of animals as sentient beings.}} |- | {{|Subsidy Control Act 2022|public|23|28-04-2022|maintained=y|archived=n|An Act to make provision regulating the giving of subsidies out of public resources; and for connected purposes.}} |- | {{|Cultural Objects (Protection from Seizure) Act 2022|public|24|28-04-2022|maintained=y|archived=n|An Act to extend the protection from seizure or forfeiture given to cultural objects.}} |- | {{|Motor Vehicles (Compulsory Insurance) Act 2022|public|25|28-04-2022|maintained=y|archived=n|An Act to amend retained EU law relating to compulsory insurance for the use of motor vehicles; and for connected purposes.}} |- | {{|Glue Traps (Offences) Act 2022|public|26|28-04-2022|maintained=y|archived=n|An Act to make certain uses of glue traps an offence; and for connected purposes.}} |- | {{|Approved Premises (Substance Testing) Act 2022|public|27|28-04-2022|maintained=y|archived=n|An Act to make provision about substance testing in approved premises.}} |- | {{|Marriage and Civil Partnership (Minimum Age) Act 2022|public|28|28-04-2022|maintained=y|archived=n|An Act to make provision about the minimum age for marriage and civil partnership; and for connected purposes.}} |- | {{|Taxis and Private Hire Vehicles (Disabled Persons) Act 2022|public|29|28-04-2022|maintained=y|archived=n|An Act to make provision relating to the carrying of disabled persons by taxis and private hire vehicles.}} |- | {{|Building Safety Act 2022|public|30|28-04-2022|maintained=y|archived=n|An Act to make provision about the safety of people in or about buildings and the standard of buildings, to amend the Architects Act 1997, and to amend provision about complaints made to a housing ombudsman.}} |- | {{|Health and Care Act 2022|public|31|28-04-2022|maintained=y|archived=n|An Act to make provision about health and social care.}} |- | {{|Police, Crime, Sentencing and Courts Act 2022|public|32|28-04-2022|maintained=y|archived=n|An Act to make provision about the police and other emergency workers; to make provision about collaboration between authorities to prevent and reduce serious violence; to make provision about offensive weapons homicide reviews; to make provision for new offences and for the modification of existing offences; to make provision about the powers of the police and other authorities for the purposes of preventing, detecting, investigating or prosecuting crime or investigating other matters; to make provision about the maintenance of public order; to make provision about the removal, storage and disposal of vehicles; to make provision in connection with driving offences; to make provision about cautions; to make provision about bail and remand; to make provision about sentencing, detention, release, management and rehabilitation of offenders; to make provision about secure 16 to 19 Academies; to make provision for and in connection with procedures before courts and tribunals; and for connected purposes.}} |- | {{|Pension Schemes (Conversion of Guaranteed Minimum Pensions) Act 2022|public|33|28-04-2022|maintained=y|archived=n|An Act to make provision about the amendment of pension schemes so as to provide for the conversion of rights to a guaranteed minimum pension.}} |- | {{|British Sign Language Act 2022|public|34|28-04-2022|maintained=y|archived=n|An Act to recognise British Sign Language as a language of England, Wales and Scotland; to require the Secretary of State to report on the promotion and facilitation of the use of British Sign Language by ministerial government departments; and to require guidance to be issued in relation to British Sign Language.}} |- | {{|Judicial Review and Courts Act 2022|public|35|28-04-2022|maintained=y|archived=n|An Act to make provision about the provision that may be made by, and the effects of, quashing orders; to make provision restricting judicial review of certain decisions of the Upper Tribunal; to make provision about the use of written and electronic procedures in courts and tribunals; to make other provision about procedure in, and the organisation of, courts and tribunals; and for connected purposes.}} |- | {{|Nationality and Borders Act 2022|public|36|28-04-2022|maintained=y|archived=n|An Act to make provision about nationality, asylum and immigration; to make provision about victims of slavery or human trafficking; to provide a power for Tribunals to charge participants where their behaviour has wasted the Tribunal’s resources; and for connected purposes.}} |- | {{|Elections Act 2022|public|37|28-04-2022|maintained=y|archived=n|An Act to make provision about the administration and conduct of elections, including provision designed to strengthen the integrity of the electoral process and provision about the use of the simple majority system in elections for certain offices; about overseas electors; about voting and candidacy rights of EU citizens; about the designation of a strategy and policy statement for the Electoral Commission; about the membership of the Speaker’s Committee; about the Electoral Commission’s functions in relation to criminal proceedings; about financial information to be provided by a political party on applying for registration; for preventing a person being registered as a political party and being a recognised non-party campaigner at the same time; about regulation of expenditure for political purposes; about disqualification of offenders for holding elective offices; about information to be included in electronic campaigning material; and for connected purposes.}} }}

== Local acts ==
{{legislationuk|act |- | {{|Highgate Cemetery Act 2022|local|1|24-03-2022|maintained=y|archived=n|An Act to confer powers upon the Friends of Highgate Cemetery Trust to operate, maintain and conserve Highgate Cemetery and to extinguish rights of burial and disturb human remains in Highgate Cemetery for the purpose of increasing the space for interments and the conservation of Highgate Cemetery; and for connected purposes.}} |- | {{|Monken Hadley Common Act 2022|local|2|28-04-2022|maintained=y|archived=n|An Act to transfer the ownership and management of Monken Hadley Common to Monken Hadley Common Trust and for related purposes.}} }}
