= Private International Law (Implementation of Agreements) Act 2020 =

Act of the Parliament of the United Kingdom

Private International Law (Implementation of Agreements) Act 2020 (Note: Section 4(5).)
- Act of Parliament
- Parliament of the United Kingdom
- Long title: An Act to implement the Hague Conventions of 1996, 2005 and 2007 and to provide for the implementation of other international agreements on private international law.
- Citation: 2020 c. 24
- Introduced by: Alex Chalk, Parliamentary Under-Secretary of State for Justice (Commons); Lord Keen of Elie, Advocate General for Scotland (Lords)
- Territorial extent: England and Wales; Scotland; Northern Ireland; (Note: Section 4(1).)

Dates
- Royal assent: 14 December 2020
- Commencement: 14 December 2020 (except sections 1 and 3(1) and schedules 1–5); 31 December 2020 (rest of act); (Note: Section 4(3)–(4).)
Other legislation
Amends	Civil Jurisdiction and Judgments Act 1982; European Union (Withdrawal) Act 2018; Civil Jurisdiction and Judgments (Hague Convention on Choice of Court Agreements 2005) (EU Exit) Regulations 2018; International Recovery of Maintenance (Hague Convention on the International Recovery of Child Support and Other Forms of Family Maintenance 2007) (EU Exit) Regulations 2018; Civil Jurisdiction and Judgments (Amendment) (EU Exit) Regulations 2019
Amended by	Retained EU Law (Revocation and Reform) Act 2023 (Consequential Amendment) Regulations 2023

Status: Amended

History of passage through Parliament

Text of statute as originally enacted

Revised text of statute as amended

The Private International Law (Implementation of Agreements) Act 2020 (c. 24) is an act of the Parliament of the United Kingdom which gives primary legislative effect to the 1996, 2005 and 2007 Hauge Conventions as signed at The Hague.

It received royal assent on 14 December 2020.

== Provisions ==
The act deals with the process for adjudicating disputes between individuals in different countries such as child custody. Child custody obligations imposed in a different state can be enforced in the United Kingdom.

Section 2 of the act allows the government to implement other international agreements relating to private international law through secondary legislation.
