= Botulinum Toxin and Cosmetic Fillers (Children) Act 2021 =

United Kingdom law

Botulinum Toxin and Cosmetic Fillers (Children) Act 2021 (Note: Section 6(5).)
- Act of Parliament
- Parliament of the United Kingdom
- Long title: An Act to make provision about the administration to persons under the age of 18 of botulinum toxin and of other substances for cosmetic purposes; and for connected purposes.
- Citation: 2021 c. 19
- Introduced by: Laura Trott (Commons); Baroness Wyld (Lords)
- Territorial extent: England and Wales; Scotland (sections 4(3) and 5); Northern Ireland (sections 4(3) and 5); (Note: Section 6(1)–(2).)

Dates
- Royal assent: 29 April 2021
- Commencement: 29 April 2021 (sections 5 and 6) (Note: Section 6(3).); 1 October 2021 (rest of act) (Note: Section 6(4). The Botulinum Toxin and Cosmetic Fillers (Children) Act 2021 (Commencement) Regulations 2021 (SI 2021/1004))
Other legislation
Amends	Consumer Rights Act 2015

Status: Current legislation

History of passage through Parliament

Text of statute as originally enacted

Revised text of statute as amended

The Botulinum Toxin and Cosmetic Fillers (Children) Act 2021 (c. 19) is an act of the Parliament of the United Kingdom. The act makes it illegal to administer botulinum toxin or fillers for cosmetic purposes to those under the age of 18.

== Provisions ==
The provisions of the act are:

=== Section 1 ===
- Making it an offence in England for a person to administer either botulinum toxin or cosmetic fillers to another person who is under the age of 18. Making someone who commits the offence liable, upon summary conviction, to a fine.
- Allowing it to be a defence to show that at the time of the offence the defendant:
  - was a registered medical practitioner
  - was a regulated health professional acting on directions from a registered medical practitioner, (Note: A regulated health professional means a registered nurse, a registered dentist under the Dentists Act 1984, a registered pharmacist under the Pharmacy Order 2010, or a registered person within the meaning of the Pharmacy (Northern Ireland) Order 1976.) or
  - believed and had taken reasonable steps to establish that the other person was over 18.

=== Section 2 ===
- Making it an offence for a person to own a business where a someone other than an approved person administers botulinum toxin or cosmetic fillers to a person under the age of 18, or where arrangements are made on the behalf of the business owner for that to happen. Making someone who commits the offence liable, upon summary conviction, to a fine.
- Allowing it to be a defence to prove that the business owner took all reasonable precautions and due diligence to avoid committing the offence.

=== Section 3 ===
- Applying the offence outlined in section 2 to bodies corporate.
- Allowing (if the offence is proved to have been committed with the consent or connivance of, or due to the neglect of, any director, manager or secretary of the body corporate or anyone purporting to act in such capacity) both the individual committing the offence and the body corporate to be held liable.

=== Section 4 ===
- Allowing offences under section 2 to be enforced by local weights and measures authorities, using their investigatory powers under the Consumer Rights Act 2015.
- Amending the Consumer Rights Act 2015 to include reference to this act.

=== Sections 5 and 6 ===
Section 5 of the act gives the Secretary of State the power to make consequential provisions by statutory instrument. Section 6 of the act lays out the territorial extent of the law and when it commences.

== Passage ==
The act was introduced in the House of Commons as a private member's bill by Laura Trott, the Conservative MP for Sevenoaks, after she was selected fourth in the private members' bill ballot in January 2020. It had its first reading in February 2020, its second reading in October 2020 and was passed to the committee stage by November. The bill had its third reading on 12 March 2021, passing to the House of Lords the same day. It had its second reading in the Lords on 16 April and its third on 28 April, with the need for committee stage being discharged. It gained royal assent on 29 April 2021.

== Commencement ==
The act came into force in October 2021.

== See also ==
- Private members' bills in the Parliament of the United Kingdom
- List of acts of the Parliament of the United Kingdom from 2021
