= Contingency fund =

Emergency money reserve

A contingencies fund or contingency fund is a fund for emergencies or unexpected outflows, mainly economic crises.

== European Union ==
The European Union created a vast contingency fund in 2010 to counteract the Great Recession.

European finance ministers, the European Central Bank (ECB), and the International Monetary Fund (IMF) took steps to address the government debt crisis in Europe, which began in Greece, by establishing a joint EU-IMF program to provide access to nearly $1 trillion in loans for the 16 eurozone nations in the event that they faced difficulties in borrowing from world bond markets.

The program aimed to give Greece financial stability to balance its budget, restructure its economy, and avoid borrowing from the open market.

Overall, the initiatives sought to restore confidence in European governments and safeguard the nascent global economic recovery.

== India ==
=== National Contingency Fund ===
Article 267(1) of the Indian Constitution authorised the establishment of a Contingency Fund of India.

Accordingly, in 1950, the Indian Parliament enacted the Contingency Fund of India Act 1950. The Contingency Fund of India exists for disasters and related unforeseen expenditures.

The fund is administered by the Finance Secretary (Department of Economic Affairs) on behalf of the President of India and it can be operated by executive action. In 2005, it was raised from Rs. 50 crore to Rs 500 crore. In 2021, it was proposed to raise the fund to Rs 30,000 crore.

=== State contingency funds ===
Similarly, a Contingency Fund for each Indian State is established under Article 267(2) of the Constitution, placing funds at the disposal of the Governor to enable them to make advances to meet urgent unforeseen expenditure, pending authorisation by the State Legislature.

The corpus of the funds varies across states and the quantum is decided by the State legislatures.

== Spain ==
In Spain, the contingency fund is used in economic crisis for public work and similar stimulus activities. There is social security contingencies fund called reserve fund, to pay pensions.

== United Kingdom ==
Contingencies Fund Act 1974 (Note: Section 2(1).)
- Act of Parliament
- Parliament of the United Kingdom
- Long title: An Act to make new provision with respect to the maximum capital of the Contingencies Fund.
- Citation: 1974 c. 18
- Territorial extent: United Kingdom

Dates
- Royal assent: 23 May 1974
- Commencement: 23 May 1974 (Note: The Acts of Parliament (Commencement) Act 1793.)
Other legislation
Amends	Miscellaneous Financial Provisions Act 1946; Miscellaneous Financial Provisions Act 1950; Miscellaneous Financial Provisions Act 1955; Miscellaneous Financial Provisions Act 1968; Contingencies Fund Act 1970
Relates to	Contingencies Fund Act 2020; Contingencies Fund Act 2021

Status: Current legislation

Text of statute as originally enacted

Revised text of statute as amended

Text of the Contingencies Fund Act 1974 as in force today (including any amendments) within the United Kingdom, from legislation.gov.uk.

The Civil Contingencies Fund was created in the United Kingdom in the early 19th century. It is held by the Treasury, and its use is regulated by the Miscellaneous Financial Provisions Act 1946. It may be used for urgent expenditure in anticipation that the money will be approved by Parliament, or for small payments that were not included in the year's budget estimates.

The Contingencies Fund Act 1974 (c. 18) sets the size of the fund as 2% of the amount of the government budget in the preceding year. In light of the COVID-19 pandemic this was temporarily raised to 50% by the Contingencies Fund Act 2020 and later lowered to 12% until April 2022 by the Contingencies Fund Act 2021.

When Parliament votes to approve the urgent expenditure, the money is repaid into the Contingencies Fund. As Parliament is effectively forced to approve actions ex post facto (after they have happened), the Treasury's use of the fund is scrutinised in detail by the Public Accounts Committee.

== See also ==
- American Recovery and Reinvestment Act of 2009
- Keynes
- Rainy day fund
- Social security
- Sovereign wealth fund
