= Stamp Duty Land Tax (Temporary Relief) Act 2020 =

UK act of parliament

- Act of Parliament
- Parliament of the United Kingdom
- Long title: An Act to make provision to reduce for a temporary period the amount of stamp duty land tax chargeable on the acquisition of residential property.
- Citation: 2020 c. 15
- Introduced by: Rishi Sunak (Commons); Lord Agnew of Oulton (Lords)

Dates
- Royal assent: 22 July 2020
- Commencement: 22 July 2020

Other legislation
- Amends: Finance Act 2003
- Amended by: Finance Act 2021; Finance Act 2025

Status: Amended

History of passage through Parliament

Text of statute as originally enacted

Revised text of statute as amended

The Stamp Duty Land Tax (Temporary Relief) Act 2020 (c. 15) an act of the Parliament of the United Kingdom that temporarily reduced stamp duty land tax on purchases of residential property in response to the COVID-19 pandemic in England and Northern Ireland. Separate provisions were made in Scotland by the Scottish Parliament, and in Wales by the Welsh Assembly.

The act temporarily modified the Finance Act 2003 to reduce the rate of tax during the period 8 July 2020 to 31 March 2021; later amendments provided for continued temporary reductions until 30 September 2021.
