= Business and Planning Act 2020 =

Act of the Parliament of the United Kingdom

Business and Planning Act 2020 (Note: Section 27.)
- Act of Parliament
- Parliament of the United Kingdom
- Long title: An Act to make provision relating to the promotion of economic recovery and growth.
- Citation: 2020 c. 16
- Introduced by: Alok Sharma, (Secretary of State for Business, Energy and Industrial Strategy) (Commons); Earl Howe (Lords)
- Territorial extent: Part 1 Extends to England and Wales, Part 2 S 12 extends to England and Wales, Scotland and Northern Ireland, Part 2 S 13 - 14 extend to England and Wales and Scotland, Part 2 S 15 Northern Ireland, Part 3 S 16-21 England and Wales, Part 3 S 22 extends to England and Wales and Northern Ireland, Part 4 England and Wales, Scotland and Northern Ireland. (Note: Section 24.)

Dates
- Royal assent: 22 July 2020
- Commencement: Various, all parts in effect from 19 August 2020 (Note: Section 25.)
Other legislation
| Amends | Consumer Credit Act 1974; Road Traffic Act 1988; Town and Country Planning Act 1990; Planning (Listed Buildings and Conservation Areas) Act 1990; Planning (Hazardous Substances) Act 1990; Licensing Act 2003; Coronavirus Act 2020 |

Status: Amended

History of passage through Parliament

Records of Parliamentary debate relating to the statute from Hansard

Text of statute as originally enacted

Revised text of statute as amended

The Business and Planning Act 2020 (c. 16) is an act of the Parliament of the United Kingdom which introduces a number of temporary and permanent measures with the purpose of allowing certain business sectors to operate whilst managing the risks arising from the COVID-19 pandemic.

== Main provisions ==
The primary provisions of the act are to:

- Facilitate bounce back loans by disapplying the provisions of the Consumer Credit Act 1974 relating to unfair relationships between lenders and borrowers in respect of loans made under the bounce back loan scheme.
- Make temporary provisions to reduce the barriers for restaurants and pubs in England to apply for pavement licences to be able to serve customers outdoors. These provisions are due to expire on 30 September 2021.
- Modify the Licensing Act 2003 to provide for authorisation for licensed premises in England and Wales to serve alcohol for consumption off site.
- Make a number of changes to the Town and Country Planning Act 1990 to ensure that the planning system can continue to operate efficiently and to support the construction industry. The changes include provisions for extensions of certain planning permissions, to allow for longer working hours on construction projects, to make certain administrative changes regarding the procedure for obtaining planning permission and to allow for the electronic inspection of the Mayor of London's spatial development strategy.
- Make changes to the licensing requirements and roadworthiness testing for heavy goods vehicles and public service vehicles to prevent a backlog of checks and tests from disrupting services.
- Exempt summer fairs, car boot sales and outdoor markets from requiring planning permission.
