= Windrush Compensation Scheme =

UK law amending existing sentencing legislation

The Windrush Compensation Scheme is a compensation scheme which was established by the Home Office to provide compensation for the victims of the Windrush scandal.

== Establishment ==
The compensation scheme was established in April 2019 by ministerial direction, before formal legislation was in place.

Windrush Compensation Scheme (Expenditure) Act 2020
- Act of Parliament
- Parliament of the United Kingdom
- Long title: An Act to provide for the payment out of money provided by Parliament of expenditure incurred by the Secretary of State or a government department under, or in connection with, the Windrush Compensation Scheme.
- Citation: 2020 c. 8
- Introduced by: Priti Patel (Commons); Baroness Williams of Trafford (Lords)
- Territorial extent: England & Wales, Scotland and Northern Ireland

Dates
- Royal assent: 8 June 2020
- Commencement: 8 June 2020

Status: Current legislation

History of passage through Parliament

Records of Parliamentary debate relating to the statute from Hansard

Text of statute as originally enacted

Revised text of statute as amended

The Windrush Compensation Scheme (Expenditure) Act 2020 (c. 8) is an act of the Parliament of the United Kingdom which established the financial authority for the scheme.

At the time it was established, the scheme the cost was expected to be between £120,000,000 and £310,000,000, based on there being 15,000 claimants.

== Functioning ==
In December 2020, the minimum payment under the scheme was raised from £250 to £1,000 and the maximum payment under the scheme was raised from £10,000 to £100,000.

The scheme does not provide legal assistance to claimants.

In October 2025, the scheme was reconfigured to allow claimants to get 75% of their compensation upfront.

== Further developments ==
In November 2020, the head of policy quit the scheme, criticising it as being racist, and unwilling, uncurious and lacking in genuine concern to the situation of victims.

As of July 2024, the scheme had paid roughly £93,580,000 across 2,634 claims with £400,000 being incorrectly denied. As of May 2025, the scheme had paid £122,000,000 across 3,300.

In 2025, the first Windrush Commissioner was appointed, with a mandate to review the working of the scheme.

The Parliamentary Ombudsman found the way the Home Office ran the scheme to be "confusing and inconsistent".
