= National Security and Investment Act 2021 =

Act of the Parliament of the United Kingdom

National Security and Investment Act 2021 (Note: Section 66(1).)
- Act of Parliament
- Parliament of the United Kingdom
- Long title: An Act to make provision for the making of orders in connection with national security risks arising from the acquisition of control over certain types of entities and assets; and for connected purposes.
- Citation: 2021 c. 25
- Introduced by: Kwasi Kwarteng (Commons); Lord Callanan (Lords)
- Territorial extent: England and Wales; Scotland; Northern Ireland; (Note: Section 66(5).)

Dates
- Royal assent: 29 April 2021
- Commencement: Various (Note: Section 66(2)–(4).)
Other legislation
Amends	Enterprise Act 2002
Repeals/revokes	Enterprise Act 2002 (Share of Supply Test) (Amendment) Order 2018; Enterprise Act 2002 (Turnover Test) (Amendment) Order 2018; Enterprise Act 2002 (Share of Supply) (Amendment) Order 2020; Enterprise Act 2002 (Turnover Test) (Amendment) Order 2020
Amended by	Criminal Justice Act 2003 (Commencement No. 33) and Sentencing Act 2020 (Commencement No. 2) Regulations 2022; Judicial Review and Courts Act 2022 (Magistrates’ Court Sentencing Powers) Regulations 2023; Secretaries of State for Energy Security and Net Zero, for Science, Innovation and Technology, for Business and Trade, and for Culture, Media and Sport and the Transfer of Functions (National Security and Investment Act 2021 etc) Order 2023

Status: Amended

History of passage through Parliament

Text of statute as originally enacted

Revised text of statute as amended

The National Security and Investment Act 2021 (c. 25) (NSIA) is an act of the Parliament of the United Kingdom which was announced in the Queen's Speech on 19 December 2019 and is a piece of legislation introduced in the House of Commons on 11 November 2020. Its Second Reading took place on 17 November 2020, and its Third Reading was scheduled for Wednesday 20 January 2021.

The NSIA was sponsored in the Commons by Alok Sharma, who was Secretary of State for Business, Energy and Industrial Strategy in the Second Johnson ministry.

Private entities and investors are required to inform the government about any prospective transactions regarding sensitive sectors such as artificial intelligence, quantum technologies, and space.

== Reception ==
While approaching its Third Reading, the Daily Telegraph was of the opinion that the "debate about foreign takeovers of companies central to the national interest - from technology to infrastructure - is certain to be a pulpit for argument between China hawks and doves."

Peter Mandelson described the law as chaotic.
