= Rainy day fund =

Reserved amount of money used when regular income is disrupted

A rainy day or rainy day fund is a reserved amount of money to be used in times when regular income is disrupted or decreased in order for typical operations to continue. In the United States, the term is usually used to apply to the funds maintained by most U.S. states to help deal with budget shortfalls in years where revenues do not match expenditures. This is critical to the operations of most state and local governments, which are legally prohibited (either by a state constitution or state laws governing local governments) from operating in a deficit position and/or taking on debt other than for specific purposes (and usually limited to a specific level) or from spending in excess of cash on hand and expected revenue, meaning that services would have to be cut in the absence of reserve funds.

New York State Comptroller Thomas DiNapoli recommended in March 2010 that the state require that one half of surpluses be deposited into the rainy day fund. The Massachusetts rainy day fund has been the focus of tussles between the governor of Massachusetts and the Massachusetts General Court. Section 49-g of the Texas Constitution provides for that state's fund (officially called the "Economic Stabilization Fund") and caps the amount of the fund at $28.5 billion. Due to Texas' rapid economic growth, the actual fund balance has neared the cap.

Some research suggests developing a national rainy day fund for states might improve state credit ratings and reduce capital financing costs for states.

== See also ==
- Contingency fund
- Emergency fund
