= New Society =

British magazine that ran from 1962 to 1988

- Frequency: Weekly
- Founder: Harrison Raison & Co.
- Founded: 1962
- Final issue: 1988
- Country: United Kingdom
- Based in: London
- Language: English
- ISSN: 0028-6729

New Society was a weekly magazine of social inquiry and social and cultural comment, published in the United Kingdom from 1962 to 1988. It drew on the disciplines of sociology, anthropology, psychology, human geography, social history and social policy, and it published wide-ranging social reportage.

== History ==
The magazine was launched by a small, London-based independent publishing house, Harrison Raison, which in 1956 had successfully launched New Scientist, a weekly magazine to serve the natural sciences. The idea was to create a comparable magazine about the social sciences. The cultural commentator Robert Hewison wrote that New Society became "a forum for the new intelligentsia", created by the expansion of higher education in Britain from the early 1960s.

New Society was usually perceived as centre-left, but it was fiercely non-partisan and never endorsed any political party. Timothy Raison, its founding editor (1962–68), was later a Conservative MP from 1970 until 1992. In Raison's opinion, New Society sought "to mirror, to analyse, to understand, not to exhort or moralise." It tried to see the world as it was, not as it was supposed to be. These aims were continued and developed under the editorship of Paul Barker (1968–86), who was described by the labour historian Eric Hobsbawm as the "most original of editors".

In the magazine's pages "ideas were always more important than ideology". The historian E. P. Thompson wrote that "New Society's hospitality to a dissenting view" was "evidence that the closure of our democratic traditions is not yet complete".

New Society saw itself as being in the documentary lineage of Picture Post, George Orwell, Mass-Observation and the documentary films of John Grierson. Timothy Raison had been on the staff of Picture Post. By contrast with other London-based magazines of opinion, New Society's emphasis was strongly non-metropolitan, and it preferred to focus on "the Other Britain".

Two of the most influential issues of the magazine were :

1. A special issue, "Non-Plan : an experiment in freedom," 20 March 1969, in which the design historian Reyner Banham, the urban geographer Peter Hall, the architect Cedric Price and Paul Barker argued jointly that much town and country planning was misguided and counter-productive and should be scrapped.

2. The issue of 17 June 1976, which broke the Official Secrets Act by reprinting cabinet minutes. Ministers were discussing ways to curtail benefit payments to British families. The plans were dropped. The confrontation was an important step on the long road to the enactment of a Freedom of Information Act.

The magazine's independence ended in 1988, when it was absorbed into the New Statesman.

In 2010 the V&A held an exhibition of documentary photographs from New Society.

Three collections of essays from New Society were published: One for Sorrow, Two for Joy: Ten Years of "New Society" (1972); Arts in Society (1977); and The Other Britain (1982).

== Contributors ==
Contributors to New Society included:

- Reyner Banham
- John Berger
- Asa Briggs
- David Cannadine
- Geoffrey Cannon
- Angela Carter
- Noam Chomsky
- Stanley Cohen
- David Donnison
- Mary Douglas
- Frank Field
- Leslie Finer
- Peter Fuller
- Ray Gosling
- Tony Gould
- Peter Hall
- Paul Harrison
- Eric Hobsbawm
- Douglas Johnson
- R. W. Johnson
- John Lahr
- R. D. Laing
- Melanie McFadyean
- Colin MacInnes
- George Melly
- Ann Oakley
- Dennis Potter
- Cedric Price
- Alan Ryan
- John Ryle
- Caroline St John-Brooks
- Jeremy Seabrook
- Laurie Taylor
- E. P. Thompson
- Ian Walker
- Colin Ward
- Peter Willmott
- Michael Wood
- Barbara Wootton
- Michael Young
- David White

== Bibliography ==
- Paul Barker (ed) (1972) One for Sorrow, Two for Joy: Ten Years of "New Society", Allen and Unwin, ISBN 0-04-300041-X
- Paul Barker (ed) (1977) Arts in Society (reprint: 2006, Five Leaves Publications, ISBN 1-905512-07-4) - contains essays by John Berger and Angela Carter, among others
- Paul Barker (ed) The Other Britain (Routledge & Kegan Paul, 1982)
- Mary Banham, editor, A Critic Writes : Essays by Reyner Banham
- Jenny Uglow, editor, Shaking a Leg: Angela Carter, Journalism and Writings (Chatto & Windus, 1997)
