= Institute for Community Studies =

British non-profit social policy organisation

- Formation: 1953; 73 years ago
- Headquarters: East London, UK
- Parent organization: The Young Foundation
- Website: www.youngfoundation.org/institute-for-community-studies

The Institute for Community Studies at The Young Foundation is a British non-profit research institute that works with communities, organisations, and policymakers to effect social change. It was founded in 1953 and is based in Toynbee Hall, East London. In 2005, it merged with the Mutual Aid Centre and was renamed The Young Foundation, in honour of its founder, the sociologist, social activist and politician Michael Young. In 2019, The Young Foundation relaunched the Institute under the auspices of chief executive officer Helen Goulden.

The Institute makes use of community-based participatory researchers to collect evidence.

== Organisational history ==
=== Origins in the work of Michael Young ===
The original Institute was founded in 1953 by British Labour economist and sociologist Michael Young as the Institute of Community Studies in response to the bureaucratic obstacles faced by working-class residents of new social housing estates in East London.

As an economist for the Labour Party, Young wrote the Labour Party manifesto "Let Us Face the Future" for the July 1945 general election that swept Labour into power. The manifesto was key to the electoral victory and to the subsequent establishment of the welfare state of post-war Britain.

Young left government in 1950 to pursue a PhD in Sociology at the London School of Economics. Under the supervision of Richard Titmuss, he completed a thesis in 1955, titled "A study of the extended family in East London." While conducting his research on housing conditions in 1952, he lamented that "the local councillors heard the complaints, but did nothing about them because they were captured by the officials."

Young cited bureaucratic obstacles and political inaction as motivations for founding the Institute of Community Studies in 1953. The Institute was to be a think tank from which many innovative public-interest projects were launched.

The early Institute's stated purpose was "to examine the interaction of the family, the community and the social services," and "to study the way in which ordinary people interacted with the newly expanded social service sector" which followed on the heels of the Labour reforms of 1945-1950. Furthermore, it "asked whether the organs of" the welfare state in the United Kingdom "were in cooperation or conflict with established patterns of family support and mutual aid" in the UK.

The Institute gained attention during its early years for its unconventional structure and its focus on community-level sociological research. of the sort that prompted Young to create it—although this meant that Young and the Institute were constantly seeking funding from donors, foundations, and the public sector. One of its first publications was Family And Kinship In East London (1957), co-authored by Young and Peter Willmott. The study was based on fieldwork with residents relocated from inner London communities to suburban housing estate. The study identified several social consequences of relocation, as highlighted in the Institute's publication. The Institute's findings contributed to ongoing debates on urban redevelopment and its impact on community structures that characterized post-war rebuilding in the UK and abroad. The Institute of Community Studies was an incubator for building nonprofit organisations to meet social needs, including NHS Direct, the Open University, The School for Social Entrepreneurs, and Which? (officially named the Consumer's Association.)

The Institute created a series of educational television programs called "Dawn University" that aired on Anglia Television. This program would become the prototype for the highly innovative Open University, launched in 1964. The Institute also fostered the distance-learning National Extension College in 1963, and, in 1972, the International Extension College for students from the developing world. In 1982, the Institute worked with historian Peter Laslett to launch the British version of the University of the Third Age of Toulouse, a French lifelong learning program begun in 1973 .

=== Renaming and Relaunch ===
Young served as the Institute's director until his death in 2002. In 2005, the Institute of Community Studies merged with the Mutual Aid Centre (another Young-founded organisation) and was renamed The Young Foundation. The Young Foundation then launched a re-conceived Institute for Community Studies as one of its constituent parts in 2019, with financial support from charitable trusts and private donors. The new Institute's stated mission includes "engag[ing] with people across the UK, with a focus on gathering public views and informing policy research."

The Institute for Community Studies at The Young Center inaugurated its relaunch with a study begun in 2019 and completed and published during the COVID-19 pandemic in the United Kingdom entitled "Safety in Numbers?"

== Notable publications by the Institute of Community Studies ==
- The Family Life of Old People: An inquiry in East London (Peter Townsend, 1957).
- Widows and their Families (Peter Marris, 1958).
- Family and Class in a London Suburb (Peter Willmott and Michael Young, 1960).
- Family and Social Change in an African City: A study of rehousing in Lagos (Peter Marris, 1961).
- Education and the Working Class (Brian Jackson, Dennis Marsden, 1962).
- Living with Mental Illness: A study in East London (Enid Mills, 1962).
- The Evolution of a Community: A Study of Dagenham after forty years (Peter Willmott, 1963).
- Human Relations and Hospital Care (Ann Cartwright, 1964).
- Innovation and Research in Education (Michael Young, 1965).
- Adolescent Boys of East London (Peter Willmott, 1966).
- Working Class Community (Brian Jackson, 1968).
- The Symmetrical Family: A study of work and leisure in the London Region (Michael Young and Peter Willmott, 1973).
