= Community studies =

Academic field in the study of community

Community studies is an academic field drawing on both sociology and anthropology and the social research methods of ethnography and participant observation in the study of community. In academic settings around the world, community studies is variously a sub-discipline of anthropology or sociology, or an independent discipline. It is often interdisciplinary and geared toward practical applications rather than purely theoretical perspectives. Community studies is sometimes combined with other fields, i.e., "Urban and Community Studies," "Health and Community Studies," or "Family and Community Studies."

== Epistemology ==
In North America, community studies drew inspiration from classic urban sociology texts produced by the Chicago School, including the works of Louis Wirth and William Foote Whyte. In Britain, community studies were developed for colonial administrators working in East Africa, particularly Kenya. It was further developed in the post-war period with the Institute of Community Studies founded by Michael Young in East London, and with the studies published from the institute, such as Family and Kinship in East London.

Community studies, like colonial anthropology, have often assumed the existence of discrete, relatively homogeneous, almost tribe-like communities, which can be studied as organic wholes. In this, it has been a key influence on communitarianism and communalism, from the local context to the global and everywhere in between.

== Curricula ==
Community studies curricula are often centered on communities' "concerns". These include mental and physical health, stress, addiction, AIDS, racism, immigration, ethnicity, gender, identity, sexuality, the environment, crime, deviance, delinquency, family problems, social competence, poverty, homelessness, and other psycho-social aspects. Understanding the socio-cultural completeness and the anthropological ramifications of the accurate analysis of community health is key to the sphere of these studies.

Another focus of curricula in community studies is upon anthropology, cultural anthropology in particular. Some programs set as prerequisite knowledge the background and historical contexts of community, drawing upon archeological findings and the theoretical underpinnings of social organization in ancient and prehistorical community settings. The theories connected with the Neolithic Revolution are one example of a deep study into how, where, and why hunter-gatherer communities formed.

Community studies have been linked to the causes of social justice, promoting peace and nonviolence and working towards social change, often within an activist framework.

== Schools with Community studies concentrations ==
- Urban and Community Studies at the University of Connecticut
- Community Studies Program at the University of Colorado Boulder.
- Urban and Community Studies at the Rochester Institute of Technology.
- College of Community and Public Service at the University of Massachusetts Boston
- Child, Family and Community Studies Integrated Curriculum Courses at Douglas College (BC, Canada)
- Center for Community Studies at Vanderbilt Peabody College of Education and Human Development
- The Centre for Urban and Community Studies at the University of Toronto
- Institute of Health and Community Studies at Bournemouth University (UK)
- Pan African Center for Community Studies at the University of Akron
- Department of Educational Policy & Community Studies at the University of Wisconsin–Milwaukee.
- Integrative Studies Concentrations - Community at George Mason University
- Department of Community, Agriculture, Recreation and Resource Studies at Michigan State University
- Department of Social Policy and Education at Birkbeck, University of London (UK)
- Department of Community and Regional Development at University of California, Davis
- Center for Urban Studies at Istanbul Şehir University
- Department of Community Studies at University of California, Santa Cruz
- Center for Communal Studies at the University of Southern Indiana

== Sources ==
- Community studies at informal education
