= Paul Barker (writer) =

English journalist and writer (1935–2019)

- Born: 24 August 1935; West Riding of Yorkshire, England
- Died: 20 July 2019 (aged 83)
- Education: Brasenose College, Oxford
- Occupations: Journalist and writer

Paul Barker (24 August 1935 – 20 July 2019) was an English journalist and writer.

== Biography ==
Barker was born in the West Riding of Yorkshire, England. He grew up in Mytholmroyd and Hebden Bridge. He was educated at local schools in the Calder Valley and won an Exhibition (scholarship) to Brasenose College, Oxford, to read French. Before taking up his place at Oxford, he did national service and was commissioned as an officer in the Intelligence Corps, and while in the Army studied Russian language at Cambridge University in the Joint Services School for Linguists with Dennis Potter in the next hut and Potter's producer Kenith Trodd in the same hut as Barker.

After taking his Oxford degree, he then went on to the École Normale Supérieure in Paris for a year as lecteur. He joined the London staff of The Times in 1959, but early in 1964 left to join the recently founded New Society as a staff writer. He went on to The Economist, but returned to New Society almost at once – in 1965 – as deputy editor. In 1968 he succeeded Timothy Raison, the first editor of New Society, and edited the magazine until 1986.

Subsequently, Barker was a columnist for The Sunday Times and a regular writer for the London Evening Standard, The Times Literary Supplement and Prospect magazine. He was awarded a research fellowship by the Royal Commission for the Exhibition of 1851 for his work on suburbia which laid the foundation for his book; The Freedoms of Suburbia (Frances Lincoln, 2009). Barker wrote on Michael Young's legacy in The Rise and Rise of Meritocracy, edited by Young Fellow Geoff Dench (Blackwell, 2006). He was a senior research fellow with the Young Foundation, as well as being a freelance journalist, broadcaster and author.

Barker died on 20 July 2019, aged 83.

== Notable works ==
=== Non-Plan: An Experiment in Freedom ===
One of Paul Barker's most significant and controversial contributions to New Society during the 1960s concerned issues around physical planning and space. In 1969, Barker collaborated with Reyner Banham, Peter Hall and Cedric Price on the article "Non-Plan: an experiment in freedom", which he published in New Society. Kazys Varnelis gives the background to this article:

'Between 1967 and 1969, the New Society deputy editor Paul Barker developed a deliberately controversial project for the magazine involving Banham, Cedric Price, and Peter Hall. In 1967, Barker ran excerpts from Herbert Gans's The Levittowners: Ways of Life and Poetics in a New Suburban Community, which he saw "as a corrective to the usual we-know-best snobberies about suburbia." At roughly the same time, Barker and Hall "floated this maverick thought: could things be any worse if there was no planning at all?" Barker elaborates: "We were especially concerned at the attempt to impose aesthetic choices on people who might have very different choices of their own. Why not, we wondered, suggest an experiment in getting along without planning and seeing what emerged?" The project, titled "Non-Plan: An Experiment in Freedom", Barker notes, "was strongly influenced by Banham’s essays in the magazine". For the special issue, which would be published on 20 March 1969, Barker recalls, "We wanted to startle people by offending against the deepest taboos. This would drive our point home." To this end Hall, Banham, and Price each took a section of the revered British countryside and imagined it blanketed with a low-density sprawl driven by automobility. According to Barker the reaction was a "mixture of deep outrage and stunned silence."

Images of neon signs—the 'imageability' so important to Banham’s idea of une architecture autre—that would mark the commercial structures of non-plan punctuated the issue. In Banham’s contribution, "Spontaneity and Space", he suggested that "the monuments of our century that have spontaneity and vitality are found not in the old cities, but in the American West. There, in the desert and the Pacific states, creations like Fremont Street in Las Vegas or Sunset Strip in Beverly Hills represent the living architecture of our age. As Tom Wolfe points out in his brilliant essay on Las Vegas, they achieve their quality by replacing buildings by signs." '

—from Kazys Varnelis, "Psychogeography and the End of Planning . Reyner Banham's Los Angeles. The Architecture of Four Ecologies", in Pat Morton, (ed), Pop Culture and Postwar American Taste (London: Blackwell, 2006)

=== The Freedoms of Suburbia ===
In late 2009, Barker's book on suburbia was published. The book was extensively reviewed, including in The Times Literary Supplement, Guardian, Daily Telegraph, Independent, Financial Times and The Economist.

=== Hebden Bridge: A Sense of Belonging ===
In 2012, Barker's book on Hebden Bridge was published. The book incorporates personal and social history and includes material from interviews carried out by Barker in the 1970s and in the early 2010s.

== Archives ==
A large quantity of Barker's correspondence and other unpublished material is held in the Churchill Archives Centre.

Barker donated a collection of photographs used in New Society to the Victoria and Albert Museum.

Barker's interview material used for Hebden Bridge: A Sense of Belonging is held at the South Pennine Archives in Hebden Bridge.

Barker's interviews with Mods and Rockers from the 1960s are in the Radzinowicz Library at the Institute of Criminology, University of Cambridge.

== Bibliography ==
- Paul Barker, with Reyner Banham, Peter Hall and Cedric Price, "Non-Plan: an experiment in freedom", New Society 338 (20 March 1969).
- Paul Barker (ed.) (1972), One for Sorrow, Two for Joy: Ten Years of "New Society", Allen and Unwin, ISBN 0-04-300041-X
- Paul Barker (ed.) (1977), Arts in Society (reprint: 2006, Five Leaves Publications, ISBN 1-905512-07-4)
- Paul Barker Non-plan revisited: or the real way cities grow. The tenth Reyner Banham memorial lecture Journal of Design History 12, 2 (1999)
- Jonathan Hughes and Simon Sadler, eds, Non-Plan: Essays on Freedom, Participation and Change in Modern Architecture and Urbanism, Oxford: Architectural Press, 2000
- Paul Barker (2009), The Freedoms of Suburbia, Frances Lincoln, ISBN 0-7112-2978-3
- Paul Barker (2012), Hebden Bridge: A Sense of Belonging, Frances Lincoln, ISBN 978-0711232150
- Paul Barker (2013), A Crooked Smile, The Grainwater Press, ISBN 9781783011209 (ebook)
- Paul Barker (2014), The Dead Don't Die, The Grainwater Press, ISBN 9781783014132 (ebook)
