= Young Foundation =

UK research organization

The Young Foundation
- Formation: 1 November 1953; 72 years ago as the Institute of Community Studies
- Type: Social Innovation think tank
- Headquarters: 58 Victoria Embankment; London; EC4Y 0DS; United Kingdom
- Chief Executive: Sue Griffiths
- Subsidiaries: Action for Happiness; Institute for Community Studies
- Staff: 35
- Volunteers: 200
- Website: YoungFoundation.org

The Young Foundation is a not-for-profit think tank driving community research and social innovation. It is named after founder Michael Young, the British sociologist and social activist.

== History ==
The Young Foundation

The Institute of Community Studies (ICS) was set up by Michael Young in 1953. The ICS was an urban studies think tank which combined academic research and practical social innovation. In 2005, it merged with the Mutual Aid Centre and was renamed The Young Foundation, in honour of its founder, Michael Young. In both current and previous incarnations, The Young Foundation claims its goals are to emphasise combining research and practical application.

Michael Young worked to shape the UK’s new welfare state after the Second World War. In the early 1950s he set up the Institute of Community Studies and used it as a base for research and action.

== Programme ==
The Young Foundation has continued to incubate new social enterprises, such as the Social Innovation Exchange in 2007 which was incorporated in 2013. The Young Foundation is currently involved in different areas including health and well-being, place-based work, inequality and support for young people.

== Notable former employees ==
- Peter Hall
- Geoff Mulgan
- Rushanara Ali
- Charlotte Leslie
- Peter Townsend
- Yvonne Roberts
- Peter Willmott
- Ann Cartwright
- Karen Dunnell

== See also ==
- Michael Young, Baron Young of Dartington
- List of UK think tanks
