= Jean Stogdon =

British social worker and campaigner

Jean Stogdon OBE
- Born: Jean Sangster; 22 July 1928; New Southgate, London
- Died: 25 December 2014 (aged 86); North London Hospice
- Occupations: Social worker and campaigner
- Known for: Co-founder of Grandparents Plus

Jean Stogdon OBE (22 July 1928 – 25 December 2014) was a British social worker and campaigner. Stogdon is best known for co-founding the charity Grandparents Plus with social entrepreneur Michael Young, Baron Young of Dartington.

== Early life ==
Jean Stogdon was born in New Southgate, London on 22 July 1928, the daughter of Percy, a capstan fitter for Standard Telephones and Cables, and Mary (née Ellis) Sangster. She was educated at Russell Lane School, East Barnet, London, leaving at the age of 14 with no formal qualifications. She met her husband-to-be, Bill Stogdon, that same year. He was the grandson of the flower-seller on whom George Bernard Shaw is believed to have based his character Eliza Doolittle. When she was 17 years old, Stogdon started work as a receptionist at the telephone company for which her father worked; she left in 1948 when she married Bill, by then a bookmaker.

== Career ==
In 1969, at the age of 40, Stogdon enrolled at the North London Polytechnic (now part of London Metropolitan University) as a social work trainee. Her husband disapproved of her decision, and as a concession she continued to carry out her domestic duties as well. She followed a successful career in social work, becoming area head in the London Borough of Camden with a staff of 200 by the time of her retirement in 1988. Stogdon had been active in the design of Camden's child-protection services, and acted as a court-appointed children's guardian in the ten years after retiring from social work. This role led to her awareness of the speed with which children were placed in care homes or put up for adoption by local authorities, notwithstanding that the Children Act 1989 required them to consider whether the child could be cared for by an extended family member before doing so.

== Social entrepreneurship ==
In 1998, at the age of 70, Stogdon joined Michael Young's School for Social Entrepreneurs where she aimed to redress the lack of formal recognition by social work professionals and policymakers of grandparents' roles and rights in the area of kinship care. The following year she travelled to the US, where she studied the experiences of African American grandparents whose adult children had become unable to care for their own offspring as a result of HIV/AIDS or drug use; the grandchildren were commonly placed in the care of strangers, many of them white. This research trip was the result of Stogdon being awarded a Winston Churchill travelling fellowship, and her subsequent report won the fellowship's highest prize. As a result of her research, Stogdon became convinced that grandparents and other extended family members should be the preferred choice as providers of care and protection to children whose parents cannot do so themselves.

== Grandparents Plus ==
Stogdon co-founded the charity Grandparents Plus with Young in 2001, where she served as co-chair of the trustees. The organisation seeks to gain better recognition of the role and importance of grandparents and wider family members, and advocates for children to be adopted or fostered by members of their extended family where possible. Young died the following year; Stogdon championed the charity's aims without her co-founder and whilst also caring for her husband, who was now deaf following a bout of meningitis. Amongst other successes Stogdon was influential in persuading the UK government to include grandparents' access rights to grandchildren following the divorce or separation of their parents in the Children and Young Persons Act 2008.

== Honours ==
Stogdon was awarded the OBE in the Queen's Birthday Honours in June 2013 for services to children and families.

== Personal life ==
Following Stogdon's marriage in 1948, she and her husband had three sons and a stillborn daughter. They moved to north London in 1955 where she remained until her death. In 1983, her husband bought her a cottage in Rhiw, on the Llŷn Peninsula in North Wales, where her mother and grandmother had both been born.

Stogdon was actively involved with the University of the Third Age (U3A) and was also a keen swimmer, swimming daily for the last thirty years of her life. In 2009, Stogdon was diagnosed with amyloidosis, and required kidney dialysis three times a week; she elected to have her dialysis in the evenings to continue campaigning during the day.

== Death and legacy ==
Stogdon died on 25 December 2014, aged 86, at the North London Hospice. She had opened the hospice's first charity shop shortly after retiring from social work. Stephen Burke, co-chair of Grandparents Plus, said:

“Without Jean Stogdon, there would have been no Grandparents Plus. The charity has put grandparents on the policy and practice agenda and is driving forward change to secure significant recognition and support for kinship carers. None of this would have happened without Jean’s leadership, energy and single-mindedness. […]. We will keep the Grandparents Plus flame burning brightly in Jean's memory".
