= National Children's Centre =

Yorkshire Children's Centre logo

The National Children’s Centre (NCC) renamed the Yorkshire Children's Centre in 2013 to better reflect its scope, is a child-care centre which was founded in Huddersfield, West Yorkshire, England in 1975 by the National Educational Research and Development Trust (NERDT). Brian Jackson, co-author with Dennis Marsden of Education and the Working Classes, founded the trust. NCC remains the centre's legal name.

== History ==
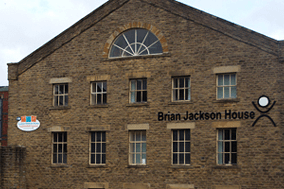
Brian Jackson House, the centre's second home in 1987

The trust's honorary vice presidents were Keith Joseph and David Sainsbury, and Denis Healey was a trustee. The NCC was established as "a multidisciplinary center - deliberately based outside London - where work on improving all aspects of childhood could be pursued. Sometimes this was to be through research, sometimes through innovative action, sometimes by informing the media or by discussing progress with politicians, administrators, or members of the many professions that touch on the field." Jackson and the NERDT enlisted Hazel Wigmore as director (until 2001), and two other teachers (John Cashman and Raymond Ball) trained with her at Huddersfield Polytechnic (now the University of Huddersfield. Jackson worked tirelessly to further causes connected with the education and welfare of children. His imaginative and innovative ideas, combined with Wigmore's energy and organisational skills, enabled the implementation of unusual practical schemes and research projects. The first home of the National Children's Centre was in Huddersfield's Longroyd Bridge neighbourhood, in a 1940s building (now listed) which straddles the river on long legs and is adjacent to a bus depot and workshop.

In 1974, Sonia Jackson (Brian's wife) had been involved in the production of the first Action Register on Childminding, part of the National Research Project on Childminding commissioned by the Social Science Research Council and run by Brian. It indicated that although registered childminders cared for more children than all local authority, private or factory day nurseries combined and had more influence at this stage of a child's development than a working parent, only one percent of childminders received services or support. The survey also discovered a large number of unregistered childminders. In 1974, responsibility for the registration of childminders moved from health departments to the new social-services departments. Based on Brian's findings—that childminders wanted the tools for the job, in addition to advice and support—groups were set up in the ground-floor nursery at Longroyd Bridge. Transportation for the women and children was provided by the NCC's minibus; it was rare for a woman to have a car at that time, and public transport was difficult with more than one child. A toy and book library, loans of safety equipment, a bulk-buying scheme, toy-repair service and access to training were available. Local childminders, including Sheila Wenzel (who later chaired the Kirklees Childminders' Association), worked with the NCC to improve services and conditions for childminders.

Jackson proposed to the BBC that "a television series with appropriate back-up would be one way of improving the quality of care offered to the young children of working mothers" (NCC Quinquennial Report 1980). Other People's Children, a 19-part series, was screened three times a week in 1977 and repeated in 1978. Seven hundred viewing groups were set up around England, not confined to childminders or pre-school workers. The BBC published a supporting handbook, which was subsidised by the Health Education Council and distributed free by social-services departments to all registered childminders throughout the country. The NCC was intimately involved in the production of the series and the handbook. In the final programme, the idea that viewing groups or local childminders might unite led to the foundation of the National Childminding Association in Birmingham in 1977.

In May 1977, the first Child Care Switchboard experiment began. Funded by the Calouste Gulbenkian Foundation, the switchboard used NCC staff and the resources of radio stations in six large UK cities to help reduce child abuse. Switchboards took calls from anyone with concerns (or questions) about child care. Reassurance, advice, and help was available from a team of professional advisers with access to a data bank of specialists. The experiment was replicated in Australia in 1979 with the country's Care For Kids careline.

The 1976 purchase of a former Bradford double-decker bus saw the introduction of the Fundecker, "taking services into the community" (NCC Quinquennial Report: 1980). Chancellor of the Exchequer Denis Healey launched the first community bus, refurbished as a mobile playroom downstairs and a mobile classroom and health centre upstairs, in November 1977. The Fundecker, initially funded by a grant from the Joseph Roundtree Charitable Trust, became a national project in partnership with Forbuoys newsagents. The NCC ran the Junglebus (an attractively-painted bus) for many years as a community resource.

Another area of pioneering work was in the multi-cultural society where the centre was based. Due partly to Hazel Wigmore's strong links with local families, the centre developed relationships with the African-Caribbean, South Asian and Chinese communities in particular. Jackson and Anne Garvey published Chinese Children, their 1975 report on Britain's first research into the educational needs of Chinese children. The country's Chinese child population was higher than realised, and few of the children spoke English. Many Hong Kong Chinese had come to Britain during the 1960s to set up restaurants and takeaways. Because they spread themselves out to avoid competition, they formed what the NCC called the "silent minority": one with no recognition, no power and no voice. They were rarely involved in the country's systems (such as law, social services, and health), preferring to solve their problems within their communities. The NCC offered advice and support, ESL classes and (later) mother-tongue classes; the children of restaurant owners were isolated from normal childhood patterns and were not being taught their mother tongue, so as they grew older they could not communicate with community elders.

The former British Rail building on New North Parade, now known as Brian Jackson House, became the NCC's second home in 1987 with the co-operation of British Rail. It was dedicated by the Duchess of Gloucester.

Wigmore and Jackson assembled a group of trustees and vice-presidents, including Neville Butler, Margaret Carter, Denis Healey, Huddersfield District Health Authority head Peter Wood, local MP Barry Sheerman, Win Wheable-Archer (former chair of Social Services), Lady Ewart-Biggs, Hugh Jackson, Alan Sainsbury and John Henniker. The Houses of Parliament regularly hosted the trustees' meetings.

Jackson advocated the appointment of a Minister for Children, who he felt would be in the position to encourage liaison and combining services to ensure optimum care and protection for children. He appreciated the challenge of parenting, and wanted parenthood classes to be part of the educational curriculum. In January 2013, the NCC changed its name to Yorkshire Children’s Centre to reflect its operation across Yorkshire.

== Activities ==
During the school term, activities included:

- Nursery groups: Childminders, support groups and other groups (such as teenage mothers)
- Munches: Monday lunches, cooked and served by a team of Youth Training Scheme trainees. Local professionals working with children (such as teachers, social workers, health workers, childminders and youth workers) were invited. The informal lunches reflected the centre's emphasis on liaison and co-operation among services.

The NCC ran a full programme during the summer, including:

- Summer Playdays: The Junglebus, inflatables and other play equipment, and trained staff travelled to underserved areas of Huddersfield to provide play opportunities.
- Give a Mum a Break: A week of respite care for severely-handicapped children
- Chinese Week: A week at Easter and in the summer of outings and activities for Chinese children and others referred by organisations
- Pantomime Visit: Annual visit to a pantomime, with free refreshments and sweets, for children who would otherwise not attend live theatre

Special projects at Longroyd Bridge included:

- Kirklees Enterprise for Youth (KEY), in partnership with Barnardo's, the Church of England Children's Society and local authorities. Twenty-four places were provided for juvenile-court referrals as an alternative to custody. A five-day-a-week programme combined group work, counselling, work experience and education aimed at re-integration into school.
- Teenage Parenthood: Research project to improve sex education and social services available to teenage parents
- Asian Naming Systems: Research into the three main Asian naming systems (Hindi, Muslim and Sikh), with conferences and training sessions for professionals in health, education and social services
- Furniture Aid Scheme: Making used furniture available at low cost for those in need

The NCC worked with a number of organisations on joint projects. Funding included trusts, foundations, organisations, government schemes and local fundraising through a charity shop, street collections and an annual Teddy Bears Picnic.

The Community Programme Scheme provided work experience and funding for local projects, such as:

- The Furniture Aid Scheme
- One of England's first volunteer bureaus, linking organisations needing volunteers with those wishing to volunteer
- The Playtrain, a nursery based in a railway carriage at the Huddersfield railway station
- Absolv: Advice, information, and support for solvent abusers, parents and teachers
- Action Stations: Health and fitness testing

== Sources ==
- "History of PACEY". Professional Association for Childcare and Early Years.
- "National Children's Centre: Quinquennial Report 1980, A Report in Celebration of Ten Years 1975 - 1985, Two Years of Progress 1985 - 87"
