= Grandparents Plus =

National charity for kinship carers in England and Wales

Grandparents Plus is a national charity in England and Wales that supports and campaigns for the 200,000 grandparents, siblings, aunts, uncles, and other relatives raising children because their parents cannot look after them.

== History ==
The organization was co-founded in 2001 by Michael Young, Baron Young of Dartington, and the charity's co-chair, Jean Stogdon OBE, a social services manager and Guardian Ad Litem. It is based on The Young Foundation, Bethnal Green, London. The Chief Executive is Lucy Peake.

Due to various family circumstances, including parental death, disability, serious illness, substance use disorders, imprisonment, or domestic violence, relatives who raise children from within the wider family are known as kinship carers. As a result, Grandparents Plus changed its name to Kinship, enabling the charity to represent all Kinship carers and those in crisis.

The charity, funded by the Big Lottery, provides advice, information, and a peer support network for kinship carers. It publishes research and campaigns for improved support and recognition for kinship carers and grandparents in the United Kingdom who provide childcare, arguing that both groups are undervalued economically.

== Film ==
Grandparents Plus and the production company My Pockets launched a film for Kinship Care Week called, 'Something to be Proud of.' The film tells the story of a child's experience with kinship care.

== Published Reports ==
- "Grandparenting in Europe: Family Policy and Grandparents’ Role in Providing Childcare", March 2013 showed that British grandparents are almost twice as likely to be in paid work as their European counterparts and 6 in 10 are providing childcare for grandchildren. The report warns of a 'care gap crisis' unless action is taken.
- "Giving Up The Day Job", June 2012 showed that 47% of kinship carers who were previously working gave up their jobs when the children moved in
- "Doing It All? Grandparents, Childcare and Employment: Analysis of British Social Attitudes Survey Data from 1998 and 2009" December 2011 showed that 63% of grandparents with grandchildren under 16 are providing childcare, with half (50%) of mothers relying on grandparents to look after their babies when they return from maternity leave.
- "Too Old To Care"
- "What If We Said No?", Oct 2010 showed that 47% of kinship carers say the reason for taking on the care of a child is a parent struggling with a substance use disorder.
- "Grandparenting in Europe", June 2010 showed that one in three working mothers depends on grandparents for childcare.
- "Protect, support, provide – examining the role of grandparents in families at risk of poverty", March 2010
- "Recognition, respect, reward", October 2009
