= Family and Kinship in East London =

1957 book by Michael Young

- Author: Michael Young; Peter Willmott
- Publisher: Penguin Books
- ISBN: 978-0-141-18912-3

Family and Kinship in East London was a 1957 sociological study of an urban working class tight-knit community, and the effects of the post-war governments' social housing policy leading to their rehousing. Many East Londoners by rigid slum clearance moved out into the new estates of the Home Counties (some of which is now outer Greater London). The study was carried out in the Metropolitan Borough of Bethnal Green, in the East End of London and a new housing estate in Essex. The research was carried out by Michael Young and Peter Willmott, who had been an integral part of building the welfare state in Britain during the tenure of Clement Attlee and the Labour government between 1945–51.

The study itself has been acknowledged by many sociologists and in its authors' critiques as being one of the most influential sociological studies of the twentieth century. It is argued by some that it has inspired British sociology to take new paths away from the more traditional broad Functionalist versus Marxist dichotomy. It used social observation as its means to do so, going away from statistical information that had been previously preferred. In this sense, it counters the Structuralist (Positivist) model that posits statistics can always be found to prove cause and effect within society.

The idea was to interact and understand a post-war community, to determine its aspirations, worries, doubts and insecurities. This key understanding moves the study into a more Interactionist line, about each individual's role within society. It could also be linked to Max Weber's idea of empathy and "going deep" to comprehend the complexity of communities.

In 1992, Michael Young and the Institute of Community Studies he founded commenced on a new survey of the area to examine the changes to the area and in particular to examine the conflict between the white working class and Bangladeshi immigrants which had become a major feature of the area. This was eventually published in 2005 after his death as The New East End: Kinship, Race and Conflict by Michael Young, Kate Gavron and Geoff Dench.

On 25 April 2007, The Guardian society section reported on the 50th Anniversary of the study. Madeleine Bunting expressed how "the voices they found described a world rich in social relationships, networks of dependence and mutual support that were central to the people's resilience in facing the adversity of insecure and low paid employment." Bunting also mentions how the pair were amongst the first to discover "social capital" and its role in shaping community life.

It was one of the first British sociological studies that investigated deeply people's attitudes, beliefs and feelings. Using detailed prose and limited statistical analysis, it charted how decisions from the top affected ordinary people in their day-to-day and prospective lives.
