= The Rise of the Meritocracy =

1958 book by Michael Young

- Cover of the Pelican Books edition
- Author: Michael Young
- Language: English
- Genre: Dystopia, political fiction
- Publisher: Thames and Hudson
- Publication date: 1958
- Publication place: United Kingdom

The Rise of the Meritocracy is a satirical novel by British sociologist and politician Michael Dunlop Young which was first published in 1958. It describes a dystopian society in a future United Kingdom in which merit (defined as IQ + effort) has become the central tenet of society, replacing previous divisions of social class and creating a society stratified between a meritorious power-holding elite and a disenfranchised underclass of the less meritorious. The essay satirised the tripartite system of education that was being practised at the time. The narrative of the book ends in 2034 with a revolt against the meritocratic elite by the "Populists".

The book was rejected by the Fabian Society and then by 11 publishers before being accepted by Thames and Hudson.

Meritocracy is the political philosophy in which political influence and power is concentrated in those with "merit", according to the intellectual talent and achievement of the individual. The word is formed by combining the Latin root "mereō" and Ancient Greek suffix "cracy". In his essay, Michael Young describes and ridicules such a society, the selective education system that was the tripartite system, and the philosophy in general. Michael Young is widely credited with coining the term "meritocracy" in the essay, but it was first used (pejoratively) by sociologist Alan Fox in 1956.

The word was adopted into the English language without the negative connotations that Young intended it to have and was embraced by supporters of the philosophy. In a 2001 article in The Guardian, Down with Meritocracy, Young expressed his disappointment in the embrace of this word and philosophy by the Labour Party under Tony Blair, stating:

It is good sense to appoint individual people to jobs on their merit. It is the opposite when those who are judged to have merit of a particular kind harden into a new social class without room in it for others.

Journalist and writer Paul Barker points out that "irony is a dangerous freight to carry" and suggests that in the 1960s and 1970s it was read "as a simple attack on the rampant meritocrats", whereas he suggests it should be read "as sociological analysis in the form of satire".

In 2006, The Rise and Rise of Meritocracy, a collection of essays marking 50 years since the coining of the term, commented that The Rise of the Meritocracy "was intended to help turn Labour away from meritocracy, by reminding it of the importance of communitarian values. Curiously, though, half a century later we have a Labour government declaring the promotion of meritocracy as one its primary objectives."

In 2018, to celebrate the 60th anniversary of the publication of The Rise of the Meritocracy, The Young Foundation, named after Michael Young, launched Beyond Meritocracy, a competition to answer the questions "What lies beyond Meritocracy?" and "What might be the equation for the 21st century?" The Rise of the Meritocracy did not say what came after the challenge to meritocracy by the Populists that it predicted in 2034. Following the rise of "populists" in 2016 such as Donald Trump in the USA and Nigel Farage in the UK, some of the essays suggested that the predictions in the book were proving prescient, and coming earlier than predicted.

== Synopsis ==
=== Introduction to the Transaction edition ===
The author had difficulties in finding a publisher for the book. One wanted a new Brave New World. Another told him they did not publish PhD theses: finally, a friend published it. It deals with "Meritocracy", a term part Latin term and part Greek, its theme being a fictitious change in society. Before, there were castes. Now with the industrial era, there are classes. People are defined by their achievements rather than by the families they are born into. Social inequality can be justified.

A meritocratic education and society can lead to problems. The rich and powerful are encouraged by the general culture and become arrogant. "The eminent know that success is a just reward for their own capacity, their own efforts", whereas the poor are demoralised. The latter "are tested again and again… If they have been labelled 'dunce' repeatedly they cannot any longer pretend; their image of themselves is more nearly a true, unflattering reflection."

Education is not only a way to get productive people. It could enrich them too.

=== Introduction ===
The novel begins in 2034, as a revolution with deep historical roots is approaching in the United Kingdom. The narrator wants to explain the rise of the meritocracy in the form of a socialist essay.

=== Part One: Rise of the Elite ===
==== Chapter One: Clash of Social Forces ====
Previously the job one had was that of one's parents; lawyers were the sons of lawyers – unfortunately, since people were not always suited to their jobs. It was an era of nepotism which survived because of tradition and the importance of family. Zealots for progress successfully introduced another education system – one that was free and elitist.

==== Chapter Two: Threat of Comprehensive Schools ====
Exceptional brains require exceptional teaching. Although society has changed, it has remained hierarchical. Aristocracy of birth has turned into an aristocracy of talent. When comprehensive schools appeared, a later development, parents were not keen to send their children there. The idea behind them was to construct a social ladder at school. The problem is the following: if one starts to study too late in life it is too hard to acquire knowledge. Comprehensive schools did not work and less importance was given to them.

==== Chapter Three: Origins of Modern Education ====
Everyone was against the comprehensive school, including the socialists. Secondary school became free. By 1950, entering grammar school no longer depended on social origins. But if the lower classes entered, they did not stay. To solve this problem, a system of allowances was set up. You were paid if you came to school. Engineering and science were judged superior to Latin. Intelligence tests called "QI" were set up, with different QI tests at different ages. There were attacks against them, but statistics showed that they worked. Some people were frustrated, not because of the idea of segregation but because of the idea of being deprived of a superior education.

==== Chapter Four: From seniority to merit ====
Industry is as important as education and there were tests in industries too. Adult merit is as important as childhood merit. Having a person giving orders just because he is older is useless and so seniority ceased to be a distinguishing feature for those at the top of the social ladder. A judge could become a taxi-driver at the end of his life. Change in the mental climate happened because merit became progressively more measurable. Intelligence and effort together make up merit; a lazy genius is useless. The narrator wonders if the stupid persons were upset. Psychologists said that they suffered but were unable to express themselves.

=== Part 2: Decline of the lower classes ===
==== Chapter Five: Status of the Worker ====
No society is completely stable. There was an age when merit was important and the distance between classes became wider. The upper classes were proud and did not have sympathy for those they governed. Meanwhile the lower classes experienced difficulties and saw themselves as "dunces" who could turn into bad citizens or bad technicians.

The schools of the upper classes tried to teach humility, and a mythos around sport, the "mythos of muscularity", was created in the education of the lower classes. Some of the latter became sports professionals, but the majority became TV-watching sport fans. The lower classes grew to esteem physical achievement, whereas the narrator and the upper classes value mental achievement.

Another solution was to make psychological treatment free to help people fulfil their own potential. The idea spread that the lower classes' children could be successful. Machines replaced unskilled men. Therefore a third of all adults were unemployed and became servants.

==== Chapter Six: Fall of the Labour movement ====
Religion had to change. Christianity kept the idea of equality of opportunity, but constructed a world of ambition. As for the political field, the selection of clever people was substituted for elections. No-one responded to the appeal of "labour". "Worker" became a discredited word and was replaced by "technician" instead. A highly educated (elite) cadre became required for union leaders. The socialists agreed with the new system and instead populists acted for the technicians.

==== Chapter Seven: Rich and Poor ====
In meritocracy the differences between the high salaries of the upper classes and the low salaries of the lower classes are justified. The salaries within each class are exactly the same and only change once every year. The populists say that it is unfair and clamour for more justice.

==== Chapter Eight: Crisis ====
Women of the elite begin campaigning on behalf of the technicians, who are indifferent. An idea develops that all jobs are equal. The populists argue for schools to promote more diversity. Women want equality. Until now their cleverness has only been used to educate their children. They are judged for their warmth of heart and not for their worldly success.

Elite status is becoming hereditary. Now, there is no longer any hope because a person's ability is known even before he or she is born. There is a traffic in babies to get those who are clever. The conservatives want this hereditary status to continue. A latent crisis is growing and a revolution is coming; the people are rising up, but they are more against the conservatives than for the populists.
