= Breheny =

Breheny is a surname. Notable people with the surname include:

- Jack Breheny (1910–2009), Australian politician
- Martin Breheny, Irish journalist and sportswriter
- Michael Breheny (1948–2003), English professor of planning
- Steve Breheny (born 1954), Australian basketball player
- Tommy Breheny (born 1967/1968), Gaelic football manager
