= Differential Education Achievement =

Differential Educational Achievement (DEA) is a sociological term often given to a concept that disagrees with some of the functionalist views on education.

Many functionalists believe that an individual's academic success depends completely upon that person's IQ (intelligence quotient) and the effort they apply to their studies. They also believe that society works in a meritocratic system: that people work for what they achieve, and achieve what they deserve, according to their own merit and effort, i.e., they work hard to get the best jobs in later life.

Some other sociologists do not concur with this idea. They think that other factors have a more prominent impact on one's education. These factors may include social class background, gender and ethnicity.

Marxists believe that this is due to social class, and that in education only the ruling class values are transmitted. This means that working-class people find it difficult to connect with the education system. In this respect, according to this theory, many people from less affluent backgrounds are academically disadvantaged from the very start.
