= Brian Jackson (educator) =

British educator (1932–1983)

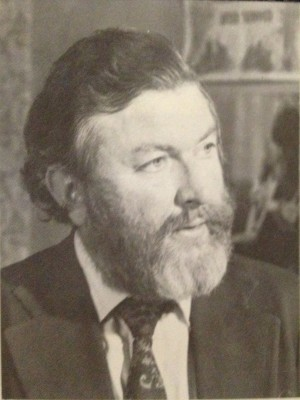
- Born: 28 December 1932; Huddersfield, West Yorkshire, England
- Died: 3 July 1983 (aged 50); Huddersfield, West Yorkshire, England
- Occupations: Educator; Sociologist
- Spouse(s): Sheila Mannion (m. 1956; div. 1977) Sonia Abrams, née Edelman (m. 1978)
- Children: 6 (Christian, Lucy, Ellen and Seth; and two step-children, Dominic and Rebecca)

Brian Jackson (28 December 1932 – 3 July 1983) was one of the most influential British sociological educationalists of the 20th century. His impact on the British educational system through his books, campaigns and action research were significant; his recognition as one of the founding fathers of the Open University, his pioneering work on the Childcare switchboard (later to become Childline in the UK), and finally before his early death, his role in establishing the National Children’s Centre in Huddersfield (now Fresh Futures incorporating Brian Jackson College). From his first experience as a primary school teacher he campaigned for the end of selective schooling, due to the impact this had on children from different backgrounds.

== Background and early life ==
Brian was born in a back-to-back house in Huddersfield, West Yorkshire, and was one of three children. He passed his 11 plus by scoring so high in the first paper that it counterbalanced his having scarlet fever and missing the second. He went to Huddersfield College and then, after doing National Service, won an exhibition to study at St Catharine's College, Cambridge, where he graduated with a degree in English in 1956. His first job was that of a primary school teacher in a village outside Cambridge where he saw first hand the detrimental impact of streaming, and the impact of inequalities on children’s education by the age of 5.

== Career ==
In 1960 Brian Jackson and Michael Young created the Advisory Centre for Education (ACE). They went on to establish the National Extension College (NEC) in 1963. The testing of the ‘Dawn University’ used TV for the first time as a teaching tool. NEC became a virtual college and the foundations of the Open University, as well as the University of the Third Age. Through ACE he also helped establish the first ‘clearing house’ for all higher education to give all pupils a chance at higher education.

In 1973, with funding from the Social Science Research Council, Brian led a groundbreaking piece of research on the ‘Educational implications of illegal child minding’, particularly focusing on West Indian children – the ‘dawnwatch’ project 'took a week in cold December and watched from before dawn in five cities, working parents taking their small children to spend many hours in care from childminders who received no support, recognition or training.'

He also founded the National Educational Research and Development Trust (NERDT), which set up the National Children's Centre in 1974 in Huddersfield. It opened its doors in 1975 in a converted tram shed in the centre of Huddersfield offering services from playgroups, home repairs to a toy library, as well as 'action registers' on the latest research and its practical implications. The centre focused on welcoming multicultural communities to improve the quality of life of all children. 50 years later the centre, now ‘Fresh Futures’, is still thriving, and working to improve lives and inspire change and to support all young people to have opportunities for a better life now and in the future. There are also two Brian Jackson Colleges offering alternative provision for students.

Jackson campaigned tirelessly for the rights and well being of the under 5s. He was a pioneer and had a major influence on the development of significant ideas in the fields of sociology, and education – and was always focused on their practical action.

== Death ==
Brian Jackson collapsed 500 yards from the finish whilst taking part in a charity five-mile run in aid of the National Children's Centre on Sunday, 3 July 1983. He was given heart massage but was pronounced dead on arrival at Huddersfield Royal Infirmary. He was only 50 years old but left a legacy that is still impacting children, their future well being and the education system today.

== Bibliography ==
- Education and the Working Class (with Dennis Marsden) (1962)
- Streaming (Routledge & Kegan Paul, 1964)
- Working Class Community (Routledge & Kegan Paul, 1968)
- Starting School (Croom Helm, 1979)
- Childminder (with Sonia Jackson) (Routledge & Kegan Paul, 1979)
- Living with Children (Sphere, 1980)
- Your Exceptional Child (Fontana, 1980)
- Fatherhood (George Allen & Unwin, 1983)
