= Meritocracy =

Political system in which capital is assigned on the basis of competence

Meritocracy (merit, from Latin mereō, and -cracy, from Ancient Greek κράτος kratos 'strength, power') is the notion of a political system in which economic goods or political power are vested in individual people based on ability and talent, rather than wealth or social class. Advancement in such a system is based on performance, as measured through examination or demonstrated achievement.

Although the concept of meritocracy has existed for centuries, the first known use of the term was by sociologist Alan Fox in the journal Socialist Commentary in 1956. It was then popularized by sociologist Michael Dunlop Young, who used the term in his dystopian political and satirical book The Rise of the Meritocracy in 1958. While the word was coined and popularized as a pejorative, its usage has ameliorated. Today, the term is often utilised to refer to social systems in which personal advancement and success primarily reflect an individual's capabilities and merits, frequently seen as equality of opportunity. It thus challenges forms of nepotism or hereditary aristocracy.

== Conceptions ==
=== Early conceptions ===
The "most common definition of meritocracy conceptualizes merit in terms of tested competency and ability, and most likely, as measured by IQ or standardized achievement tests". In government and other administrative systems, "meritocracy" refers to a system under which advancement within the system turns on "merits", like performance, intelligence, credentials, and education. These are often determined through evaluations or examinations.

In a more general sense, meritocracy can refer to any form of evaluation based on achievement. Like "utilitarian" and "pragmatic", the word "meritocratic" has also developed a broader connotation, and is sometimes used to refer to any government run by "a ruling or influential class of educated or able people".

This is in contrast to the original, condemnatory use of the term in 1958 by Michael Dunlop Young in his work The Rise of the Meritocracy, who was satirizing the ostensibly merit-based tripartite system of education practiced in the United Kingdom at the time; he claimed that, in the tripartite system, "merit is equated with intelligence-plus-effort, its possessors are identified at an early age and selected for appropriate intensive education, and there is an obsession with quantification, test-scoring, and qualifications".

Meritocracy in its wider sense, may be any general act of judgment upon the basis of various demonstrated merits; such acts frequently are described in sociology and psychology.

In rhetoric, the demonstration of one's merit regarding mastery of a particular subject is an essential task most directly related to the Aristotelian term Ethos. The equivalent Aristotelian conception of meritocracy is based upon aristocratic or oligarchic structures, rather than in the context of the modern state.

=== More recent conceptions ===
To this day, the origin of the term meritocracy is widely attributed to the British sociologist Michael Young, who used it pejoratively in his book The Rise of the Meritocracy. For Young, merit is defined as intelligence plus effort. As a result, he portrays a fictional meritocratic society as a dystopia, in which social stratification is based solely on intelligence and individual merit, which creates a highly competitive and unequal society.

Despite this initial negative connotation, the term meritocracy has gained some positive recognition more recently. As such, it is nowadays applied to merit-based systems of status and reward allocation in distinction to aristocratic or class-based systems, in which inherited factors are the primary determinant for the position of an individual in society.

Yet, the concept of meritocracy as a social system has also attracted much criticism. In light of the rising social inequality in the 21st century, scholars have labelled meritocracy a political ideology and an illusion. As Thomas Piketty notes in his book Capital in the Twenty-First Century "our democratic societies rest on a meritocratic worldview". Accordingly, restricted mobility and the significance of inherited wealth co-exist with the belief in a meritocratic system. Consequently, "the idea of meritocracy has become a key means of cultural legitimation for contemporary capitalist culture", in which wealth and income inequalities are being perpetuated and reproduced. This is supported by recent research which shows that, the more unequal a society, the higher the tendency of members of that society to attribute success to meritocracy rather than non-meritocratic variables such as inherited wealth.

This illustrates that the contemporary conception of meritocracy is at least twofold. On the one hand, it describes a social system based on the notion that individuals are rewarded and advance in society as a result of their talent and effort. This conception presupposes social mobility and equality of opportunity. On the other hand, meritocracy can be understood as an ideological discourse grounded in different belief systems, that manifest themselves in different forms such as social democratic and neoliberal conceptions of meritocracy. Most Americans, across nearly all demographics, believe college admissions, hiring and promotions should be based on qualifications and performance, not social factors. This is according to a private opinion research survey conducted by think-tank, Populace.

The most common form of meritocratic screening found today is the college degree. Higher education is an imperfect meritocratic screening system for various reasons, such as lack of uniform standards worldwide, lack of scope (not all occupations and processes are included), and lack of access (some talented people never have an opportunity to participate because of the expenses, disasters or war, most especially in developing countries, health issues or disability).

The Bismarck model for health care and pensions with total benefits equaling to contributions has been compared to meritocracy.

== Etymology ==
Although the concept has existed for centuries, the term "meritocracy" is relatively new. It was first used pejoratively by sociologist Alan Fox in 1956, and then by British politician and sociologist Michael Dunlop Young in his 1958 satirical essay The Rise of the Meritocracy. Young's essay pictured the United Kingdom under the rule of a government favouring intelligence and aptitude (merit) above all else, being the combination of the root of Latin origin "merit" (from "mereō" meaning "earn") and the Ancient Greek suffix "-cracy" (meaning "power", "rule"). The purely Greek word is axiocracy (αξιοκρατία), from axios (αξιος, worthy) + "-cracy" (-κρατία, power).

In this book the term had distinctly negative connotations as Young questioned both the legitimacy of the selection process used to become a member of this elite and the outcomes of being ruled by such a narrowly defined group. The essay, written in the first person by a fictional historical narrator in 2034, interweaves history from the politics of pre- and post-war Britain with those of fictional future events in the short (1960 onward) and long term (2020 onward).

The essay was based upon the tendency of the then-current governments, in their striving toward intelligence, to ignore shortcomings and upon the failure of education systems to utilize correctly the gifted and talented members within their societies.

Young's fictional narrator explains that, on the one hand, the greatest contributor to society is not the "stolid mass" or majority, but the "creative minority" or members of the "restless elite". On the other hand, he claims that there are casualties of progress whose influence is underestimated and that, from such stolid adherence to natural science and intelligence, arises arrogance and complacency. This problem is encapsulated in the phrase "Every selection of one is a rejection of many".

It was also used by Hannah Arendt in her essay "Crisis in Education", which was written in 1954 and refers to the use of meritocracy in the English educational system. She too uses the term pejoratively. It was not until 1972 that Daniel Bell used the term positively. Michael Young's formula to describe meritocracy is: m= IQ+E. Lorenzo Ieva's formula instead is: m= f (IQ, Cut, ex) + E. That is, for Young, meritocracy is the sum of intelligence and effort; while, for Ieva it is represented by the complex function between intelligence, culture and experience, to which energy or effort is then added.

== History ==
=== Imperial China ===
Some of the earliest example of an administrative meritocracy, based on civil service examinations, dates back to Ancient China. (Note: This is the history of the meritocracy in the technical sense. The vaguer definition of a meritocracy as a "rule by intelligence" has been applied to many ancient Greek, Indian, Chinese, and Jewish thinkers and statesmen. For example, the Sanhedrin, the legislature of Ancient Israel and Kingdom of Judah, is sometimes called as an "intellectual meritocracy", in the sense that its members were drawn from religious scribes and not the aristocracy. Appointment was self-perpetuating, however, and new members were chosen personally by existing members. These are not meritocracies in the administrative sense, in which merit is determined objectively as a "tested competency or ability.") The concept originates, at least by the sixth century BC, when it was advocated by the Chinese philosopher Confucius, who "invented the notion that those who govern should do so because of merit, not of inherited status. This sets in motion the creation of the imperial examinations and bureaucracies open only to those who passed tests".

As the Qin and Han dynasties developed a meritocratic system in order to maintain power over a large, sprawling empire, it became necessary for the government to maintain a complex network of officials. Prospective officials could come from a rural background and government positions were not restricted to the nobility. Rank was determined by merit, through the civil service examinations, and education became the key for social mobility. After the fall of the Han dynasty, the nine-rank system was established during the Three Kingdoms period.

According to the Princeton Encyclopedia of American History:

One of the oldest examples of a merit-based civil service system existed in the imperial bureaucracy of China. Tracing back to 200 B.C., the Han dynasty adopted Confucianism as the basis of its political philosophy and structure, which included the revolutionary idea of replacing nobility of blood with one of virtue and honesty, and thereby calling for administrative appointments to be based solely on merit. This system allowed anyone who passed an examination to become a government officer, a position that would bring wealth and honor to the whole family. In part due to Chinese influence, the first European civil service did not originate in Europe, but rather in India by the British-run East India Company... company managers hired and promoted employees based on competitive examinations in order to prevent corruption and favoritism.

=== Ancient Greece ===
Both Plato and Aristotle advocated meritocracy, Plato in his The Republic, arguing that the wisest should rule, and hence the rulers should be philosopher kings.

=== Islamic World ===
The Rashidun caliphate succession rule was based on meritocracy (Most renown people for their merit would gather in a Shura assembly and choose the caliph based on merit). As the first caliph of the Rashidun caliphate, Abu Bakr was not a monarch and never claimed such a title; nor did any of his three successors. Rather, their election and leadership were based upon merit.

After the reforms of Mehmed II, the Ottoman standing army was recruited from the devşirme, a group that took Christian subjects at a young age (8–20 yrs): they were converted to Islam, then schooled for administration or the military Janissaries. This was a meritocracy which "produced from among their alumni four out of five Grand Viziers from this time on". Mehmed II's first grand vizier was Zaganos Pasha, who was of devşirme background as opposed to an aristocrat, and Zaganos Pasha's successor, Mahmud Pasha Angelović, was also of devşirme background. It is reported by Madeline Zilfi that European visitors of the time commented "In making appointments, Sultan pays no regard to any pretensions on the score of wealth or rank. It is by merits that man rise.. Among the Turks, honours, high posts and Judgeships are rewards of great ability and good service."

Safavid Persian society was also a meritocracy where officials were appointed on the basis of worth and merit, and not on the basis of birth. It was certainly not an oligarchy, nor was it an aristocracy. Sons of nobles were considered for the succession of their fathers as a mark of respect, but they had to prove themselves worthy of the position. This system avoided an entrenched aristocracy or a caste society. There are numerous recorded accounts of laymen that rose to high official posts as a result of their merits. And since the Safavid society was meritocratic, government offices constantly felt the pressure of being under surveillance and had to make sure they governed in the best interest of their leader, and not merely their own.

=== 17th century ===
The concept of meritocracy spread from China to British India during the seventeenth century.

The first European power to implement a successful meritocratic civil service was the British Empire, in their administration of India: "company managers hired and promoted employees based on competitive examinations in order to prevent corruption and favoritism". British colonial administrators advocated the spread of the system to the rest of the Commonwealth, the most "persistent" of which was Thomas Taylor Meadows, Britain's consul in Guangzhou, China. Meadows successfully argued in his Desultory Notes on the Government and People of China, published in 1847, that "the long duration of the Chinese empire is solely and altogether owing to the good government which consists in the advancement of men of talent and merit only", and that the British must reform their civil service by making the institution meritocratic. This practice later was adopted in the late nineteenth century by the British mainland, inspired by the "Chinese mandarin system".

=== 18th century ===
The Asante monarch Osei Kwadwo, who ruled from c. 1764 to 1777, began the meritocratic system of appointing central officials according to their ability, rather than their birth.

=== 19th century ===
In 1813, U.S. Founding Father and President Thomas Jefferson declared that there exists a "natural aristocracy of men" whose right to rule comes from their talent and virtue (merit), rather than their wealth or inherited status. He believed a successful republic must establish educational institutions that identify these natural aristocrats and train them to rule.

The federal bureaucracy in the United States used the spoils system from 1828 until the assassination of United States President James A. Garfield by a disappointed office seeker in 1881 proved its dangers. Two years later in 1883, the system of appointments to the United States Federal Bureaucracy was revamped by the Pendleton Civil Service Reform Act, partially based on the British meritocratic civil service that had been established years earlier. The act stipulated that government jobs should be awarded on the basis of merit, through competitive exams, rather than ties to politicians or political affiliation. It also made it illegal to fire or demote government employees for political reasons.

To enforce the merit system and the judicial system, the law also created the United States Civil Service Commission. In the modern American meritocracy, the president may hand out only a certain number of jobs, which must be approved by the United States Senate.

Australia began establishing public universities in the 1850s with the goal of promoting meritocracy by providing advanced training and credentials. The educational system was set up to service urban males of middle-class background, but of diverse social and religious origins. It was increasingly extended to all graduates of the public school system, those of rural and regional background, and then to women and finally to ethnic minorities. Both the middle classes and the working classes have promoted the ideal of meritocracy within a strong commitment to "mate-ship" and political equality.

The British philosopher and polymath John Stuart Mill advocated meritocracy in his book Considerations on Representative Government. His model was to give more votes to the more educated voter. His views are explained in Estlund (2003:57–58):

Mill's proposal of plural voting has two motives. One is to prevent one group or class of people from being able to control the political process even without having to give reasons in order to gain sufficient support. He calls this the problem of class legislation. Since the most numerous class is also at a lower level of education and social rank, this could be partly remedied by giving those at the higher ranks plural votes. A second, and equally prominent motive for plural voting is to avoid giving equal influence to each person without regard to their merit, intelligence, etc. He thinks that it is fundamentally important that political institutions embody, in their spirit, the recognition that some opinions are worth more than others. He does not say that this is a route to producing better political decisions, but it is hard to understand his argument, based on this second motive, in any other way.

So, if Aristotle is right that the deliberation is best if participants are numerous (and assuming for simplicity that the voters are the deliberators) then this is a reason for giving all or many citizens a vote, but this does not yet show that the wiser subset should not have, say, two or three; in that way something would be given both to the value of the diverse perspectives, and to the value of the greater wisdom of the few. This combination of the Platonic and Aristotelian points is part of what I think is so formidable about Mill's proposal of plural voting. It is also an advantage of his view that he proposes to privilege not the wise, but the educated. Even if we agreed that the wise should rule, there is a serious problem about how to identify them. This becomes especially important if a successful political justification must be generally acceptable to the ruled. In that case, privileging the wise would require not only their being so wise as to be better rulers, but also, and more demandingly, that their wisdom be something that can be agreed to by all reasonable citizens. I turn to this conception of justification below.

Mill's position has great plausibility: good education promotes the ability of citizens to rule more wisely. So, how can we deny that the educated subset would rule more wisely than others? But then why shouldn't they have more votes?

Estlund goes on to criticize Mill's education-based meritocracy on various grounds.

=== 20th century to today ===
Singapore describes meritocracy as one of its official guiding principles for domestic public policy formulation, placing emphasis on academic credentials as objective measures of merit.

There is criticism that, under this system, Singaporean society is being increasingly stratified and that an elite class is being created from a narrow segment of the population. Singapore has a growing level of tutoring for children, and top tutors are often paid better than school teachers. Defenders of this system recall the ancient Chinese proverb "Wealth never survives past three generations" (Chinese: 富不过三代), suggesting that the nepotism or cronyism of elitists eventually will be, and often are, limited by those lower down the hierarchy.

Singaporean academics are continuously re-examining the application of meritocracy as an ideological tool and how it's stretched to encompass the ruling party's objectives. Professor Kenneth Paul Tan at the Lee Kuan Yew School of Public Policy asserts that "meritocracy, in trying to 'isolate' merit by treating people with fundamentally unequal backgrounds as superficially the same, can be a practice that ignores and even conceals the real advantages and disadvantages that are unevenly distributed to different segments of an inherently unequal society, a practice that in fact perpetuates this fundamental inequality. In this way, those who are picked by meritocracy as having merit may already have enjoyed unfair advantages from the very beginning, ignored according to the principle of nondiscrimination".

How meritocracy in the Singaporean context relates to the application of pragmatism as an ideological device, which combines strict adherence to market principles without any aversion to social engineering and little propensity for classical social welfarism, is further illustrated by Kenneth Paul Tan in subsequent articles:

There is a strong ideological quality in Singapore's pragmatism, and a strongly pragmatic quality in ideological negotiations within the dynamics of hegemony. In this complex relationship, the combination of ideological and pragmatic maneuvering over the decades has resulted in the historical dominance of government by the PAP in partnership with global capital whose interests have been advanced without much reservation.

Within the Ecuadorian Ministry of Labor, the Ecuadorian Meritocracy Institute was created under the technical advice of the Singaporean government.

With similar objections, John Rawls rejects the ideal of meritocracy as well.

== Confucianism ==
子曰：有教無類。
The Master said: "In teaching, there should be no distinction of classes."

— Analects 15.39 (Legge translation).

Although Confucius claimed that he never invented anything but was only transmitting ancient knowledge (Analects 7.1), he did produce a number of new ideas. Many European and American admirers such as Voltaire and Herrlee G. Creel point to the revolutionary idea of replacing nobility of blood with nobility of virtue. Jūnzǐ (君子, lit. "lord's son"), which originally signified the younger, non-inheriting, offspring of a noble, became, in Confucius's work, an epithet having much the same meaning and evolution as the English "gentleman".

A virtuous commoner who cultivates his qualities may be a "gentleman", while a shameless son of the king is only a "petty person". That Confucius admitted students of different classes as disciples is a clear demonstration that he fought against the feudal structures that defined pre-imperial Chinese society.

Another new idea, that of meritocracy, led to the introduction of the imperial examination system in China. This system allowed anyone who passed an examination to become a government officer, a position which would bring wealth and honour to the whole family. The Chinese imperial examination system started in the Sui dynasty. Over the following centuries the system grew until finally almost anyone who wished to become an official had to prove his worth by passing a set of written government examinations.

Confucian political meritocracy is not merely a historical phenomenon. The practice of meritocracy still exists across China and East Asia today, and a wide range of contemporary intellectuals—from Daniel Bell to Tongdong Bai, Joseph Chan, and Jiang Qing—defend political meritocracy as a viable alternative to liberal democracy.

In Just Hierarchy, Daniel Bell and Wang Pei argue that hierarchies are inevitable. Faced with ever-increasing complexity at scale, modern societies must build hierarchies to coordinate collective action and tackle long-term problems such as climate change. In this context, people need not—and should not—want to flatten hierarchies as much as possible. They ought to ask what makes political hierarchies just and use these criteria to decide the institutions that deserve preservation, those that require reform, and those that need radical transformation. They call this approach "progressive conservatism", a term that reflects the ambiguous place of the Confucian tradition within the Left-Right dichotomy.

Bell and Wang propose two justifications for political hierarchies that do not depend on a "one person, one vote" system. First is raw efficiency, which may require centralized rule in the hands of the competent few. Second, and most important, is serving the interests of the people (and the common good more broadly). In Against Political Equality, Tongdong Bai complements this account by using a proto-Rawlsian "political difference principle". Just as Rawls claims that economic inequality is justified so long as it benefits those at the bottom of the socioeconomic ladder, so Bai argues that political inequality is justified so long as it benefits those materially worse off.

Bell, Wang, and Bai all criticize liberal democracy to argue that government by the people may not be government for the people in any meaningful sense of the term. They argue that voters tend to act in irrational, tribal, short-termist ways; they are vulnerable to populism and struggle to account for the interests of future generations. In other words, at a minimum, democracy needs Confucian meritocratic checks.

In The China Model, Bell argues that Confucian political meritocracy provides—and has provided—a blueprint for China's development. For Bell, the ideal according to which China should reform itself (and has reformed itself) follows a simple structure: Aspiring rulers first pass hyper-selective examinations, then have to rule well at the local level to be promoted to positions as the provincial level, then have to excel at the provincial level to access positions at the national level, and so on. This system aligns with what Harvard historian James Hankins calls "virtue politics", or the idea that institutions should be built to select the most competent and virtuous rulers—as opposed to institutions concerned first and foremost with limiting the power of rulers.

While contemporary defenders of Confucian political meritocracy all accept this broad frame, they disagree with each other on three main questions: institutional design, the means by which meritocrats are promoted, and the compatibility of Confucian political meritocracy with liberalism.

=== Institutional design ===
Bell and Wang favour a system in which officials at the local level are democratically elected and higher-level officials are promoted by peers. As Bell puts it, he defends "democracy at the bottom, experimentation in the middle, and meritocracy at the top." Bell and Wang argue that this combination conserves the main advantages of democracy—involving the people in public affairs at the local level, strengthening the legitimacy of the system, forcing some degree of direct accountability, etc.—while preserving the broader meritocratic character of the regime.

Jiang Qing, by contrast, imagines a tricameral government with one chamber selected by the people (the House of the Commoners 庶民院), one chamber composed of Confucian meritocrats selected via examination and gradual promotion (the House of Confucian Tradition 通儒院), and one body made up of descendants of Confucius himself (The House of National Essence 國體院). Jiang's aim is to construct a legitimacy that will go beyond what he sees as the atomistic, individualist, and utilitarian ethos of modern democracies and ground authority in something sacred and traditional. While Jiang's model is closer to an ideal theory than Bell's proposals, it represents a more traditionalist alternative.

Tongdong Bai presents an in-between solution by proposing a two-tiered bicameral system. At the local level, as with Bell, Bai advocates Deweyan participatory democracy. At the national level, Bai proposes two chambers: one of meritocrats (selected by examination, by examination and promotion, from leaders in certain professional fields, etc.), and one of representatives elected by the people. While the lower house does not have any legislative power per se, it acts as a popular accountability mechanism by championing the people and putting pressure on the upper house. More generally, Bai argues that his model marries the best of meritocracy and democracy. Following Dewey's account of democracy as a way of life, he points to the participatory features of his local model: citizens still get to have a democratic lifestyle, participate in political affairs, and be educated as "democratic men". Similarly, the lower house allows citizens to be represented, have a voice in public affairs (albeit a weak one), and ensure accountability. Meanwhile, the meritocratic house preserves competence, statesmanship, and Confucian virtues.

=== Promotion system ===
Defenders of Confucian political meritocracy all champion a system in which rulers are selected on the basis of intellect, social skills, and virtue. Bell proposes a model wherein aspiring meritocrats take hyper-selective exams and prove themselves at the local levels of government before reaching the higher levels of government, where they hold more centralized power. In his account, the exams select for intellect and other virtues—for instance, the ability to argue three different viewpoints on a contentious issue may indicate a certain degree of openness. Tongdong Bai's approach incorporates different ways to select members of the meritocratic house, from exams to performance in various fields—business, science, administration, and so on. In every case, Confucian meritocrats draw on China's extensive history of meritocratic administration to outline the pros and cons of competing methods of selection.

For those who, like Bell, defend a model in which performance at the local levels of government determines future promotion, an important question is how the system judges who "performs best". In other words, while examinations may ensure that early-career officials are competent and educated, how is it thereafter ensured that only those who rule well get promoted? The literature opposes those who prefer evaluation by peers to evaluation by superiors, with some thinkers including quasi-democratic selection mechanisms along the way. Bell and Wang favour a system in which officials at the local level are democratically elected and higher-level officials are promoted by peers. Because they believe that promotion should depend upon peer evaluations only, Bell and Wang argue against transparency—i.e. the public should not know how officials are selected, since ordinary people are in no position to judge officials beyond the local level. Others, like Jiang Qing, defend a model in which superiors decide who gets promoted; this method is in line with more traditionalist strands of Confucian political thought, which place a greater emphasis on strict hierarchies and epistemic paternalism—that is, the idea that older and more experienced people know more.

=== Compatibility with liberalism and democracy ===
Another key question is whether Confucian political thought is compatible with liberalism. Tongdong Bai, for instance, argues that while Confucian political thought departs from the "one person, one vote" model, it can conserve many of the essential characteristics of liberalism, such as freedom of speech and individual rights. In fact, both Daniel Bell and Tongdong Bai hold that Confucian political meritocracy can tackle challenges that liberalism wants to tackle, but cannot by itself. At the cultural level, for instance, Confucianism, its institutions, and its rituals offer bulwarks against atomization and individualism. At the political level, the non-democratic side of political meritocracy is—for Bell and Bai—more efficient at addressing long-term questions such as climate change, in part because the meritocrats do not have to worry about the whims of public opinion.

Joseph Chan defends the compatibility of Confucianism with both liberalism and democracy. In his book Confucian Perfectionism, he argues that Confucians can embrace both democracy and liberalism on instrumental grounds; that is, while liberal democracy may not be valuable for its own sake, its institutions remains valuable—particularly when combined with a broadly Confucian culture—to serve Confucian ends and inculcate Confucian virtues.

=== Critique of political meritocracy ===
Other Confucians have criticized Confucian meritocrats like Bell for their rejection of democracy. For them, Confucianism does not have to be premised on the assumption that meritorious, virtuous political leadership is inherently incompatible with popular sovereignty, political equality and the right to political participation. These thinkers accuse the meritocrats of overestimating the flaws of democracy, mistaking temporary flaws for permanent and inherent features, and underestimating the challenges that the construction of a true political meritocracy poses in practice—including those faced by contemporary China and Singapore. Franz Mang claims that, when decoupled from democracy, meritocracy tends to deteriorate into an oppressive regime under putatively "meritorious" but actually "authoritarian" rulers; Mang accuses Bell's China model of being self-defeating, as—Mang claims—the Chinese Communist Party's authoritarian modes of engagement with the dissenting voices illustrate. He Baogang and Mark Warren add that "meritocracy" should be understood as a concept describing a regime's character rather than its type, which is determined by distribution of political power—on their view, democratic institutions can be built which are meritocratic insofar as they favour competence.

Roy Tseng, drawing on the New Confucians of the twentieth century, argues that Confucianism and liberal democracy can enter into a dialectical process, in which liberal rights and voting rights are rethought into resolutely modern, but nonetheless Confucian ways of life. This synthesis, blending Confucians rituals and institutions with a broader liberal democratic frame, is distinct from both Western-style liberalism—which, for Tseng, suffers from excessive individualism and a lack of moral vision—and from traditional Confucianism—which, for Tseng, has historically suffered from rigid hierarchies and sclerotic elites. Against defenders of political meritocracy, Tseng claims that the fusion of Confucian and democratic institutions can conserve the best of both worlds, producing a more communal democracy which draws on a rich ethical tradition, addresses abuses of power, and combines popular accountability with a clear attention to the cultivation of virtue in elites.

Another illustration of the Meritocracy Gap can be seen in the ways that nations, like China, choose to promote many of its government officials. What is very troubling is the ways in which Princelings in the Chinese Government contradict the ideas "equal social classes" and "inherent ability" presented in the ideal operations of a meritocratic government. The reality is that four out of the seven Community Party Officials of the Chinese Elite Government are Princelings. It has been widely noted that large numbers of prominent party leaders and families have used their political power to convert state assets into their own private wealth. In reality, the high number of Princelings in Chinese government contradicts the idea of "equal promotion of officials based on ability in a meritocracy government. The high presence of Princelings in Chinese government continues to illustrate that elite corruption still plays a significant role in the convergence and operation of state government.

== Criticism ==
=== By individuals ===
==== Michael Young ====
Michael Young popularized the word "meritocracy" as a pejorative but it was adopted into the English language without the negative connotations that Young intended it to have. It was embraced by supporters of the philosophy. Young expressed his disappointment in the embrace of this word and philosophy by the Labour Party under Tony Blair in The Guardian in an article in 2001, where he states:

It is good sense to appoint individual people to jobs on their merit. It is the opposite when those who are judged to have merit of a particular kind harden into a new social class without room in it for others.

==== The Rise and Rise of the Meritocracy ====
Geoff Dench in The Rise and Rise of Meritocracy (2006) commented that the rise of the meritocracy

was intended to help turn Labour away from meritocracy, by reminding it of the importance of communitarian values. Curiously, though, half a century later we have a Labour government declaring the promotion of meritocracy as one its primary objectives.

==== Chris Hayes ====
In his 2012 book Twilight of the Elites: America After Meritocracy, Chris Hayes argues that the movement towards meritocracy has produced widespread inequality and corruption, which has led to a record decrease in the trust of American institutions.

==== Pope Francis ====
In his 2023 apostolic exhortation Laudate Deum, Pope Francis referred to "mistaken notions" developed around the concept of meritocracy, warning that

a healthy approach to the value of hard work, the development of one's native abilities and a praiseworthy spirit of initiative is one thing, but if one does not seek a genuine equality of opportunity, 'meritocracy' can easily become a screen that further consolidates the privileges of a few with great power.

=== Books ===
==== The Meritocracy Trap ====
In his 2019 book The Meritocracy Trap, Daniel Markovits poses that meritocracy is responsible for the exacerbation of social stratification, to the detriment of much of the general population. He introduces the idea of "snowball inequality", a perpetually widening gap between elite workers and members of the middle class. While the elite obtain exclusive positions thanks to their wealth of demonstrated merit, they occupy jobs and oust middle class workers from the core of economic events. The elites use their high earnings to secure the best education for their own children, so that they may enter the world of work with a competitive advantage over those who did not have the same opportunities. Thus, the cycle continues with each generation.

In this case, the middle class suffers decreased opportunities for individual prosperity and financial success. While it is impossible to quantify the exact effects of this social divide on the middle class, the opioid epidemic, dramatic rises in "deaths of despair" (suicides, mental health and alcoholism), and lowering life expectancy in these meritocratic societies are often listed as results of it. It is not only the middle class who suffer the negative effects of meritocracy, however. The societal elite have to pay a significant price for their hectic working life. Many admit suffering from physical and mental health issues, inability to sustain a good quality personal life and a lack of time spent with their families. Children of the social elite are often forced into a highly competitive educational environment from a young age, which continues throughout school, university, and into their work life. Through this argument, the author attacks the idea of a meritocracy as a fair means to evaluate and reward the most skilled and hard-working members of society.

Markovits proposes a different approach to meritocracy, one where socioeconomic life conveniences are freely distributed to the people who are sufficiently successful at the things they are doing rather than creating an environment of ongoing competition. He calls for reform of economic roles, organizations and institutions in order to include a wider population and hence narrow the increasing inequality gap by questioning the social hegemony of high-profile workers, and intervening with redistribution of earnings, working hours and social identity on behalf of middle class workers.

==== The Tyranny of Merit ====
In his book The Tyranny of Merit: What's Become of the Common Good?, the American political philosopher Michael Sandel argues that the meritocratic ideal has become a moral and political problem for contemporary Western societies. He contends that the meritocratic belief that personal success is solely based on individual merit and effort has led to a neglection of the common good, the erosion of solidarity, and the rise of inequality. Sandel's criticism concerns the widespread notion that those who achieve success deserve it because of their intelligence, talent and effort. Instead, he argues that this belief is flawed since it ignores the role of luck and external circumstances, such as social and external factors, which are beyond an individual's control.

As a consequence, Sandel attributes the increasing gap between economic "winners and losers", the decline of civic engagement and the rise of populism to the meritocratic ideal. In addition, he argues that the promise of meritocracy creates an elite that is disconnected from society and lacks empathy for those, who are left behind. Elite institutions including the Ivy League and Wall Street have corrupted the virtue, according to Sandel, and the sense of who deserves power.

Ultimately, the argument of Michael Sandel is that "meritocracy today functions less as an alternative to inequality than as its primary justification". Thus, he makes the case for a reconsideration of our understanding of success and the common good including public debates regarding the extent of the welfare state. According to Sandel, this entails a deliberation about what constitutes a contribution to the common good and how these ought to be rewarded. Hence, he appeals to move beyond distributive justice towards contributive justice, that is "creating conditions to enable everyone to contribute to the common good and to receive honor and recognition for having done so". To this end, he suggest public policies such as more progressive taxation to reduce economic inequalities.

==== Imagined Meritocracy ====
Most of the criticism against meritocracy, including Sandel's argument in "The Tyranny of Merit", treats "meritocracy" as a mechanism that allocates rewards in accordance with one's abilities, but violates substantive equality. Casting doubt on this fundamental assumption, the Japanese sociologist Satoshi Araki examined whether economic outcomes are linked to individuals' skills levels in the United States. He found that the economic return to educational qualifications per se was significantly larger than that to cognitive skills and that intergenerational inequality had been substantially formed via credentials rather than abilities - that is why the unfair situation like "side doors" may exist. Araki therefore argues that contemporary America is a typical credential society, where credentialism prevails over skills-based meritocracy, but people are navigated to misbelieve that their society is meritocratic. Calling this situation "imagined meritocracy", he underscores the importance of examining the credential/meritocratic nature of a society by distinguishing the function of educational credentials as such and that of actual abilities both conceptually and empirically lest we mislead scholarly/policy discussion and public debate based on the imagined discourse of meritocracy.

=== Practicality ===
The term "meritocracy" was originally intended as a negative concept. One of the primary concerns with meritocracy is the unclear definition of "merit". What is considered as meritorious can differ with opinions as on which qualities are considered the most worthy, raising the question of which "merit" is the highest—or, in other words, which standard is the "best" standard. As the supposed effectiveness of a meritocracy is based on the supposed competence of its officials, this standard of merit cannot be arbitrary and has to also reflect the competencies required for their roles.

The reliability of the authority and system that assesses each individual's merit is another point of concern. As a meritocratic system relies on a standard of merit to measure and compare people against, the system by which this is done has to be reliable to ensure that their assessed merit accurately reflects their potential capabilities. Standardized testing, which reflects the meritocratic sorting process, has come under criticism for being rigid and unable to accurately assess many valuable qualities and potentials of students. Education theorist Bill Ayers, commenting on the limitations of standardized testing, writes that "standardized tests can't measure initiative, creativity, imagination, conceptual thinking, curiosity, effort, irony, judgment, commitment, nuance, good will, ethical reflection, or a host of other valuable dispositions and attributes. What they can measure and count are isolated skills, specific facts and function, content knowledge, the least interesting and least significant aspects of learning". Merit determined through the opinionated evaluations of teachers, while being able to assess the valuable qualities that cannot be assessed by standardized testing, are unreliable as the opinions, insights, biases, and standards of the teachers vary greatly. If the system of evaluation is corrupt, non-transparent, opinionated or misguided, decisions regarding who has the highest merit can be highly fallible.

The level of education required in order to become competitive in a meritocracy may also be costly, effectively limiting candidacy for a position of power to those with the means necessary to become educated. Eight of the nine Supreme Court of the United States Justices, for example, attended only Harvard or Yale and generally only consider clerkship candidates who attended a top-five university, while in the 1950s the two universities only accounted for around one fifth of the justices.

Similarly, feminist critics have noted that many hierarchical organisations actually favour individuals who have received disproportionate support of an informal kind (e.g. mentorship, word-of-mouth opportunities, and so on), such that only those who benefit from such supports are likely to understand these organisations as meritocratic.

Cornell University economist Robert H. Frank rejects meritocracy in his book Success and Luck: Good Fortune and the Myth of Meritocracy. He describes how chance plays a significant role in deciding who gets what that is not objectively based on merit. He does not discount the importance of talent and hard work, but, using psychological studies, mathematical formulae, and examples, demonstrates that among groups of people performing at a high level, chance (luck) plays an enormous role in an individual's success.

==== Undesirable outcomes ====
Another concern regards the principle of incompetence, or the "Peter principle". As people rise in a meritocratic society through the social hierarchy through their demonstrated merit, they eventually reach, and become stuck, at a level too difficult for them to perform effectively; they are promoted to incompetence. This reduces the effectiveness of a meritocratic system, the supposed main practical benefit of which is the competence of those who run the society.

In his book Meritocratic Education and Social Worthlessness (Palgrave, 2012), the philosopher Khen Lampert argued that educational meritocracy is nothing but a post-modern version of Social Darwinism. Its proponents argue that the theory justifies social inequality as being meritocratic. This social theory holds that Darwin's theory of evolution by natural selection is a model, not only for the development of biological traits in a population, but also as an application for human social institutions—the existing social institutions being implicitly declared as normative. Social Darwinism shares its roots with early progressivism, and was most popular from the late nineteenth century to the end of World War II. Darwin only ventured to propound his theories in a biological sense, and it is other thinkers and theorists who have applied Darwin's model normatively to unequal endowments of human ambitions.

== See also ==
- Achievement ideology
- Civil service entrance examination
- Differential Education Achievement
- Discrimination of excellence
- Educational entrance examination
- Elitism
- Equality of opportunity
- Equality of outcome
- Epistemic democracy
- Merit, excellence, and intelligence (MEI) – framework that emphasizes selecting candidates based solely on their merit, achievements, skills, abilities, intelligence and contributions
- Merit (Buddhism)
- Merit (Christianity)
- Ownership society
- Social mobility
- Technocracy
