= Mothers Alone =

1969 book by Dennis Marsden

Mothers Alone: Poverty and the Fatherless Family
- Author: Dennis Marsden
- Language: English
- Publication date: 1969
- Publication place: England
- ISBN: 978-0-7139-0062-0

Mothers Alone: Poverty and the Fatherless Family is a book by the British sociologist Dennis Marsden based on a study with the same name in 1955–1966. The aim of the study is to learn more about the lives of mothers living alone, whether they are unmarried, separated, divorced, or widowed.

The study was developed from the larger "Poverty in the UK" project by Peter Townsend and Mothers Alone was meant to analyse the problems that families experience due to low levels of income and the lack of fathers. Questions asked in the study include issues such as housing conditions, homelessness, diet and nutrition, family relations and the adequacy of assistance offered.

Most of the data has been digitalized and it can be obtained, together with additional study information, from the Economic and Social Data Service (ESDS) website.

== Bibliography ==
- Marsden, Dennis (1969), Mothers Alone: Poverty and the Fatherless Family, London: Penguin Press
