= Ann Cartwright =

British sociologist (born 1925)

Ann Cartwright (born 1925) is a British statistician and socio-medical researcher. Her Institute for Social Studies in Medical Care was launched by Michael Young, initially under the auspices of his Institute of Community Studies where Cartwright went to work in 1960.

The Institute produced numerous books and reports for the Department of Health which explored issues with the use and perception of primary medical care in Britain. One report (Medicine Takers, Prescribers & Hoarders, 1972) was written with Karen Dunnell, now the UK's National Statistician. Others included Patients & Their Doctors (1967), Parent & Family Planning Services (1970), Life Before Death (1973, with Hockey & Anderson and The Role of Residential and Nursing Homes in the Last Year of People's Lives (1988).

Cartwright retired in 1993 and the institute was subsequently disbanded.
