= Open College of the Arts =

Art school in Barnsley, England

Location
- DMC 02; County Way; Barnsley, South Yorkshire, S70 2AG; England
- Coordinates: 53.5552°N 1.4791°W

Information
- Type: Independent, charity
- Established: 1987
- Founder: Michael Young
- Chair: Ian Fribbance
- Chief executive: Will Woods
- Staff: 120 tutors
- Affiliations: The Open University
- Website: www.oca.ac.uk

The Open College of the Arts (OCA) is an open learning arts college, with a Head Office in Barnsley in South Yorkshire, England. Founded in 1987 by Michael Young, it is a registered charity and part of The Open University. As of the 2023/24 academic year, the full cost of a part-time undergraduate degree with the Open College of the Arts is around half the cost of a degree at a bricks-and-mortar university.

OCA was acquired by the Open University (OU) in 2022 and from 1 August 2023 OCA-taught students were enrolled as OU students.

== Courses ==
The OCA offers BA honours degrees in the following areas:

- Creative Arts
- Creative Writing
- Drawing
- Fine Art
- Garden Design
- Graphic Design
- Illustration
- Interior Design
- Music
- Painting
- Photography
- Textiles
- Visual Communications

An award-winning MA in Fine Art was launched in 2011. The MA in Graphic Design was launched in 2021. Degrees are awarded by the Open University.

The OCA has an open-door academic policy for its level 1 courses. Each student is assigned one of the college's 115 specialist tutors, who are arts practitioners and have experience teaching in higher education. The tutors' responsibilities are limited to marking and providing feedback on student assignments.

Courses offered by the OCA are frequently updated or rewritten and new courses are added from time to time. Recent introductions are graphic design, illustration, digital film production and visual culture and there are new short courses in photography and psychogeography, adding to existing courses in these areas. Students and tutors all work from home and there is a well attended programme of study visits.

== Management ==
As a charity the OCA is overseen by a board of trustees.

== Student Association ==
Students are members of the OCA Student Association.
