= Tony Gould (journalist) =

British journalist and author (1938–2026)

Tony Gould (1938 – 17 March 2026) was a British journalist and author.

== Life and career ==
Gould was born in Bovey Tracey, Devon in 1938. He was educated at King's Bruton school and later attended Trinity College, Cambridge. Gould later served in the military, notably in Nepal, and Hong Kong, where he contracted polio in 1959.

During his career, he worked for the BBC as a radio producer. He also contributed to the New Society, and New Statesman.

He also produced a number of non-fiction novels, including Inside Outsider: The Life and Times of Colin MacInnes.

Gould died on 17 March 2026, aged 87.
