= Geoff Dench =

British social scientist (1940 – 2018)

- Born: 14 August 1940; Brighton, England
- Died: 24 June 2018 (aged 77)
- Education: Varndean Grammar School for Boys; Fitzwilliam College, University of Cambridge

Professor Geoff Dench (14 August 1940 – 24 June 2018) was a British social scientist whose work related particularly to the lives of working class men. He did extensive research using opinion surveys and arrived at conclusions relating to immigration, meritocracy and feminism that were out of keeping with prevailing attitudes in British academia in the later twentieth century.

== Early life and education ==
Geoff Dench was born in Brighton on 14 August 1940 to Herbert, a dental technician, and Edna, who had trained as an accountant. He did not see his father until he was five years old due to the Second World War. His parents divorced when he was 18.

He was educated at Varndean Grammar School for Boys, Brighton, and then at Fitzwilliam College, Cambridge, where he did not excel, gaining a lower-second class degree in the Archaeology and Anthropology Tripos in 1962. There he met Michael Young, author of The Rise of the Meritocracy (1958), and together they established the Cambridge Sociology Society. He completed his PhD at the London School of Economics on the Maltese community in Soho in the 1950s.

== Career ==
Dench helped to create the Department of Social Policy and Sociology at the University of Middlesex and subsequently became professor there.

His work related particularly to the lives of working class men. He did extensive research using opinion surveys and arrived at conclusions relating to immigration, meritocracy and feminism that were out of keeping with prevailing attitudes in British academia in the later twentieth century.

Dench's 1994 book The Frog, The Prince, and the Problem of Men argued that patriarchy 'guarantees that men will be fitted in the society' and questioned feminist assumptions.

In The New East End (2006) he explored, with co-authors Kate Gavron and Michael Young (died 2002), the attitudes of the white working class to Bangladeshi immigrants in the London area of Tower Hamlets and particularly the tensions between the two over the allocation of social housing. The book was an updating of Young's East End, Family and Kinship (1957). The authors concluded that the alienation of the white community in the area was partly an unintended consequence of policies designed to help the poorest in society but which ignored the legitimate expectations of other communities such as the white working class.

== Personal life ==
Dench married Fanny Peterson, twice, and they had three daughters. He later married Belinda Brown and they also had a daughter. Late in life he converted from Methodism to Anglo-Catholicism.

== Death ==
Dench died on 24 June 2018 from the effects of progressive supranuclear palsy.

== Selected publications ==
- Maltese in London: A Case-study in the Erosion of Ethnic Consciousness. Routledge and Kegan Paul, London, 1975.
- Minorities in the Open Society: Prisoners of Ambivalence. Routledge and Kegan Paul, London, 1986. ISBN 0710208987
- Transforming Men: Changing Patterns of Dependency and Dominance in Gender Relations. Transaction Publishers, 1996. ISBN 1560002328
- The New East End: Kinship, Race and Conflict. Profile, London, 2006. (With Kate Gavron and Michael Young) ISBN 9781861979285
- What Women Want. Evidence from British Social Attitudes
- Rewriting the Sexual Contract (Ed.)
- Grandparenting in Britain: A Baseline Study
- The Place of Men in Changing Family Cultures
- Rediscovering Family
- Grandmothers of the Revolution
- The Family Strikes Back: Changing Attitudes to Work and Family
- The Frog, the Prince & the Problem of Men, London, 1994.
- Grandmothers: The Changing Culture
- The Moral Economy of Grandparenting
- Valuing Informal Care
- From extended family to state dependency: report on study into African-Caribbean family structure : carried out with Institute of Community Studies, for Hilden Trust
