= National Extension College =

British distance learning college

National Extension College (NEC)
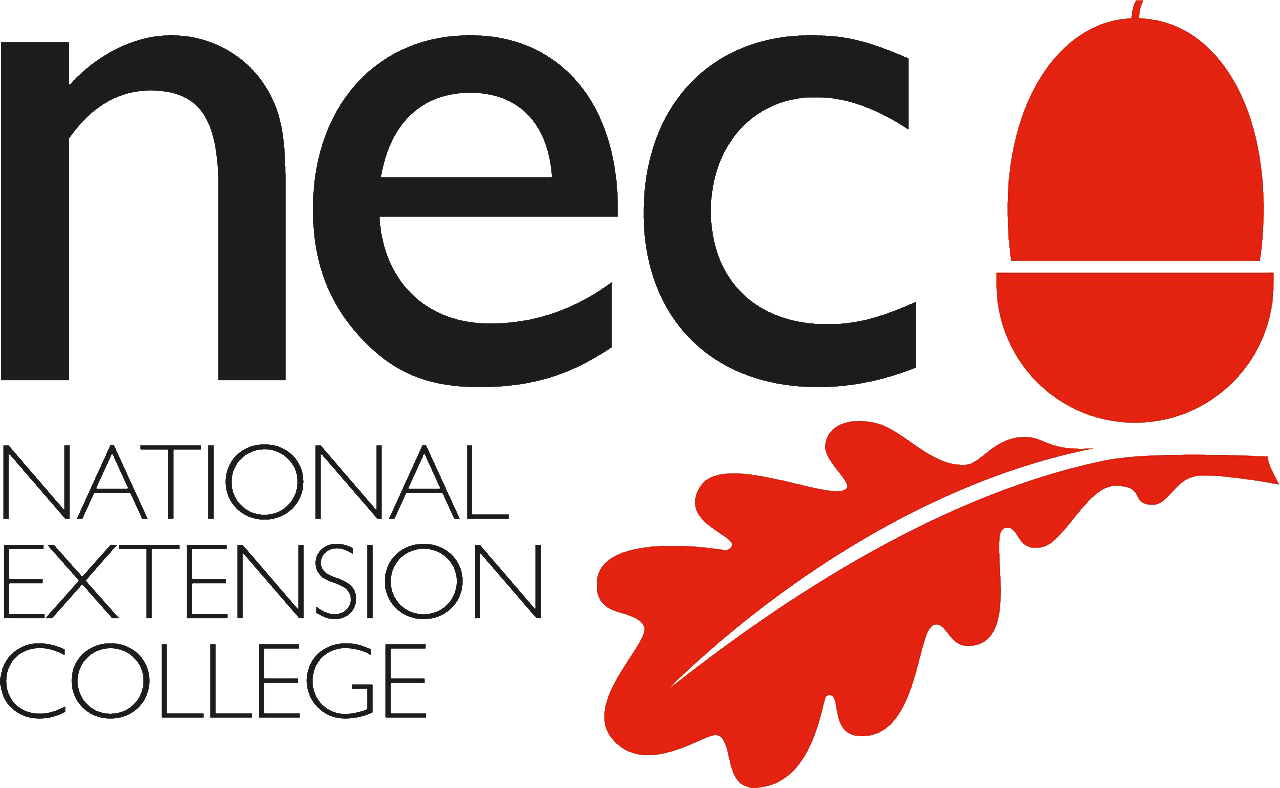
- Industry: Education
- Founded: Cambridge, UK
- Headquarters: Cambridge, UK
- Products: Distance Learning Courses
- Website: www.nec.ac.uk

The National Extension College (NEC) was set up in 1963 as a not-for-profit organisation for distance learning for people of all ages. It was founded as a pilot study for the Open University.

The college provides over 60 online distance learning courses, making education more accessible to those who would be unable to study in a mainstream school/college.

NEC was founded by Brian Jackson and Michael Young, Lord Young of Dartington, a British sociologist, social activist, and politician.

A registered educational charity, the college works in partnership with organisations including The Open University, The National Institute of Adult Continuing Education (NIACE), the Association for Art History, UnionLearn, The WEA, European Association for Distance Learning (EADL), and Big Issue.

== Curriculum ==
NEC offers a comprehensive range of GCSEs, IGCSEs and A levels, as well as a number of vocational and business courses.

Subjects covered at GCSE and IGCSE level include the sciences, English literature and language, foundation and higher maths, French and business studies.

A levels offered by the college include biology, business studies, economics, geography and philosophy, as well as more special interest topics including classical civilisation and history of art.

Other qualifications available from the NEC include courses leading to teaching qualifications, childcare diplomas, business and management qualifications and various courses in bookkeeping and counselling.

== Teaching methods ==
NEC works with subject specialists to develop its own learning materials

When a student enrols with NEC they receive a login to an online learning portal. They are also allocated a tutor, who is contactable via the learn@nec messaging service. The personal tutor is responsible for marking the student's work and providing feedback for the duration of the course. In addition to the personal tutor, the student can direct questions and queries to NEC's dedicated Student Support Team.

Further support for learners comes from NEC's online student forums, which enable learners to contact each other to discuss the course.

== History ==
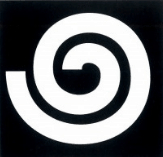
NEC's original logo

=== 1963-1979 ===
The National Extension College was first announced in the October 1963 edition of Where?, a monthly journal then published by the Advisory Centre for Education. Founder Michael Young introduced the organisation as being the "Invisible College of Cambridge", in reference to the fact that the college would have no teaching premises or full-time teachers of its own and would instead use Cambridge University premises and members of staff from various universities to deliver its courses.

Young envisaged a new type of educational institution, designed to provide education to learners without them needing to attend regular classes or adhere to a particular timetable: "We are thinking rather of the people who cannot turn up regularly for ordinary classes... people who must study in odd moments of the week if they are to study at all."

The NEC initially offered a limited range of courses including O level English and mathematics, various vocational courses and a range of programmes in conjunction with the University of London's external degree programme. The college made effective use of local television to increase public awareness of its existence and received more than 3,000 enquiries from potential students in its first eight weeks. Five lectures, entitled Dawn University were televised over a week in October 1963 on the ITV network by Anglia Television.

A major increase in the college's size came in 1964, when the NEC took over the failing University Correspondence College, a Cambridge-based organisation dating back to 1888 who published H. G. Wells' first book Text Book of Biology. The takeover granted the NEC an additional 50 staff, an enlarged portfolio of correspondence courses and a larger office from which to operate.

The NEC continued to expand through the 1960s and 1970s. The late 1970s saw a change in emphasis, as the college began offering a range of experimental courses as well as the more traditional "O" and "A" level qualifications. At the same time the organisation was diversifying and changing its profile, moving from being a traditional correspondence college towards becoming a prolific educational publisher and provider of educational services to both the private and public sectors. This broadening of the college's remit necessitated a move to a larger headquarters, so in 1979 the NEC moved to 18 Brooklands Avenue, Cambridge, the building that would be its base for the next 22 years.

=== 1980-1999 ===
In the early 1980s the NEC's focus moved away from enrolling new students and further towards the publishing of educational materials.

By 1986 the emphasis had shifted so far towards producing educational materials for learners studying at other organisations that the then-director, Richard Freeman, wanted the NEC to become a materials provider with no actual students of its own. At the same time, the national "O" level qualifications were being replaced by GCSEs, meaning that if the NEC was to continue to enlist new students on traditional courses a tremendous amount of work would be required to bring its courses up-to-date. However, the departure of Freeman in January 1987 saw the NEC reaffirm its commitment to being a college in its own right and a major investment in new courses brought with it a significant increase in enrollments.

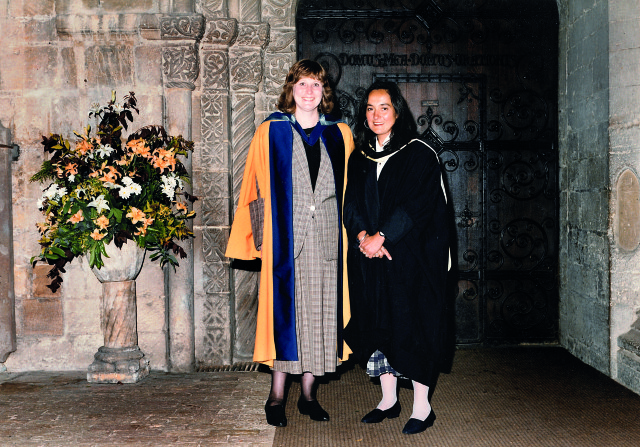
Morpeth at her degree ceremony at Ely Cathedral with Helen Lentell being awarded an Honorary Doctorate for her contribution to distance learning in 1994.

By the time the college celebrated its 25th anniversary in 1988, it had provided courses through distance learning to more than 250,000 students. The organisation marked the occasion with a major conference on open learning, "Open Learning in Transition". The end of the 1980s also saw an increased focus on vocational courses, with new programmes on business administration, accounting and book-keeping being introduced.

The college continued to expand through the 1990s, growing both in terms of staff numbers and enlisted students. By 1999 it was dealing with more than 10,000 new enrolments each year, and was fast outgrowing its Brooklands Avenue base. To cope with its increase in scale, in 2000 the organisation moved to The Michael Young Centre on Purbeck Road, Cambridge.

Ros Morpeth, Chief Executive of the college, received an honorary doctorate for her contribution to distance learning in 1994.

=== 2000-2014 ===
Operating from its new headquarters, the NEC continued to grow throughout the 2000s. The new A level curriculum, introduced in 2000, was another extremely busy time for the organisation, with its editorial team producing more than 16,000 pages of materials to accommodate the change. At this time the college was educating more than 20,000 students each year and providing more than 150 tutor-supported home-learning courses. At the same time it continued to produce materials for other educational institutions, maintaining a portfolio of more than 200 learning resources for colleges, trainers and employers.

The end of the 2000s was a time of major change for the college, the most significant aspect of which was its merger with the Learning and Skills Network in 2010. Both charitable organisations, the LSN and NEC had many shared objectives that suggested the two would make good partners. The merger was short-lived however, as the LSN went into administration in late 2011.

It did not take long for the NEC to find a new partner with which to progress its educational work, and in December 2011 the college joined forces with the Open School Trust.

Ros Morpeth, chief executive of the National Extension College (NEC), was named TES FE Leader of the Year for her "tenacity and inspirational leadership".

=== 2015-present day ===
==== 2015 ====
NEC's Chief Executive Ros Morpeth was appointed OBE in the Queen's Birthday Honours 2015. Morpeth came out of retirement in 2011, which she left in 2003 after 27 years. Since then, she has been Chief Executive and trustee of the National Extension College.

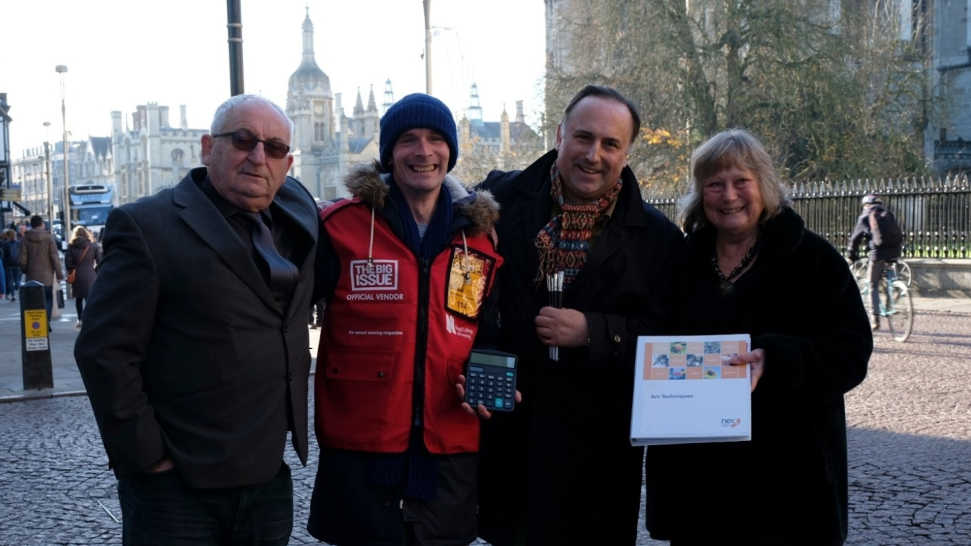
Lord John Bird and Dr Ros Morpeth OBE present bursaries to former and present Big Issue vendors.

==== 2018 ====
NEC student Najma was interviewed on Victoria Derbyshire. As well as revealing on live television that she achieved a grade 8 (equivalent to an A*) in her maths course, she reflected that her experience studying with NEC was a necessary one: "Even though I had done a degree, there were some areas (in the degree) which were never touched upon…So it gave me a good subject knowledge, which is necessary for when I go into the classroom as a teacher."

==== 2019 ====
On 25 April 2019, BBC 4 broadcast an hour long documentary Happy Birthday OU: 50 Years of The Open University, later reviewed by Lucy Mangan for the Guardian online.

Dr Ros Morpeth OBE was part of the Steering Group which advised on the development of the "Learning at Life Transitions" report published in July 2019.

In August 2019, NEC launched their new website with an improved online enrolment process, more interactive features and refreshed branding.

==== 2020 ====
January 2020 saw the launch of NEC's A level History of Art distance learning course, following the Pearson Edexcel specifications. This course was developed in partnership with the Association for Art History and written by experienced teachers at Art History in Schools. Announced in November 2019 at a launch in the Grammar School at Leeds, the course garnered media attention and coverage as a way of studying this once endangered subject through distance learning. Supported by the University of Leeds' School of Fine Art, History of Art and Cultural Studies, the launch included a lecture on Margaret Atwood, dystopian fiction, women and image delivered by Professor Griselda Pollock and a talk by Professor Abigail Harrison Moore.

Following their 30th birthday in 2019, on 3 February 2020, the Prisoners' Education Trust (PET) announced its top ten most popular courses of 2019, two of which are courses delivered by the National Extension College, Business Start-Up and Creative Writing. Though primarily an online distance learning college, many of NEC's courses have been adapted into print formats in order for them to be delivered effectively in a prison setting.

February 2020 also saw the announcement of the University of Cambridge's Institute of Continuing Education (ICE) and the NEC collaboration to offer a tuition fee bursary scheme for the 2020–2021 academic year, with the first recipient of the bursary beginning their studies in September 2020.
