= Michael Breheny =

Professor of planning

Michael Breheny (30 October 1948 – 11 February 2003) was professor of planning at Reading University. He specialised in the planning and management of new economic growth sectors during the post-industrial growth phase in Europe in the 1980s and 1990s.

== Background ==
Breheny was born in Nottingham, and educated at High Pavement 6th form College, now New College Nottingham. In 1971 he graduated in planning from Leeds Polytechnic (now Leeds Beckett University). He also had an MSc in regional and urban planning from Reading University (1972). His first major job was at Gloucestershire county planning department where he rose to become senior research officer and group leader for research. His research training led him into academia. Spurred on by Sir Peter Hall he became lecturer in the Department of Geography at Reading University in 1980, where he remained until his death. He was promoted to Reader in 1988, Professor of Applied Geography in 1991, and latterly moved Departments to become Chair of Planning.

He had senior roles in the Regional Science Association International, the Town and Country Planning Association and the Economic and Social Research Council's research grants board.

He was married to Isobel Breheny, they had two daughters, Alice and Lauren. He died from a brain tumour. An obituary appears in the journal Environment and Planning B of which he was coeditor.

== Academic contributions ==
Breheny was known for his desire to see Europe, and particularly South East Britain, deal with the rapid changes in land use planning and demand that emerged in the post-industrial era of the 1980s and 1990s. At this time, the conventional manufacturing sector was declining rapidly, and 'high-tech' industry and decentralised employment opportunities were expanding, following trends in California and elsewhere. This required more advanced road and public transport networks, land for small mixed use commercial units, and expansion to housing, out of town retail, and public facilities often away from the established employment areas. Reading was situated in the middle of the 'high tech corridor' stretching from London to Bristol, and Breheny and his students in applied geography and planning sought to identify and predict these new trends, although much of their work happened before advances in telecommunications and the internet began in earnest.

Breheny argued, somewhat controversially, against a return to the planning of the Compact City, favouring planned but decentralised urban and regional development, matched with better urban transport and lower energy consumption. At times he embraced out of town retailing, as well as office parks. His work placed him as favourable to economic growth and change underpinned by good planning. Academic work, he argued, should have relevance to contemporary public policy issues.

The journal Environment and Planning B of which he was coeditor from 1989 to 2003 awards an annual prize, The Breheny Prize, for the best paper each year in his memory.

== Publications ==
- Michael J. Breheny 1974. Towards Measures of Spatial Opportunity: a Technique for the Partial Evaluation of Plans. Elsevier Science & Technology Books.
- Michael J. Breheny, Douglas A. Hart, Peter Hall 1986. Eastern Promise? Development Prospects for the M11 Corridor. Spatial and Economic Associates, Faculty of Urban and Regional Studies, University of Reading.
- Peter Hall, Michael J Breheny, Ronald McQuaid, Douglas Hart. 1987. Western Sunrise: The Genesis and Growth of Britain's Major High Tech Corridor. Unwin Hyman.
- Michael J. Breheny & Ronald McQuaid. 1987. The Development of High Technology Industries: an International Survey. Croom Helm.
- Michael J Breheny (ed.) 1988. Defence Expenditure and Regional Development. Continuum International Publishing Group.
- Michael J. Breheny, P. Congdon (eds.). 1989. Growth and change in a core region: the case of South East England Pion.
- Michael J Breheny (ed.) 1992. Sustainable Development and Urban Form. Pion.
- Michael J. Breheny, Douglas Hart, Jeremy Howells. 1992. Remaking the Regional Economy: Celebrating Achievement, Shaping New Policies for the South East. South East Economic Development Strategy.
- Michael J. Breheny, Tim Gent, David Lock. 1993. Alternative development patterns: new settlements. H.M.S.O.
- Michael J. Breheny & Alan Hooper (ed.). 1995. Rationality in Planning: Critical Essays on the Role of Rationality in Urban & Regional Planning. Pion.
- Michael J Breheny. 1995. The Compact City and Transport Energy Consumption. Transactions of the Institute of British Geographers, New Series, 20(1): 81–101.
- Michael J Breheny and Peter Hall (eds.) 1996. The people – where will they go? National report of the TCPA Regional Inquiry into Housing Need and Provision in England. Town and Country Planning Association.
- Michael J Breheny and Peter Hall (eds.) 1999. The people – where will they work? National report of the TCPA Regional Inquiry into Housing Need and Provision in England. Town and Country Planning Association.
