= International Extension College =

College in the UK

More commonly referred to as the IEC, the International Extension College is a defunct non-profit organization that was based in Cambridge in the UK. Its primary aim was to help set up and manage distance learning educational initiatives in developing countries.

In the years since its inception, the IEC helped to set up many organizations, and often worked in partnership with a variety of others including NGOs, educational establishments and governments. Some of the projects include:

- The Women in Fishing Industry Project (WIFIP), working with fishing communities around Lake Victoria in Kenya, using radio education to improve health.
- The Building Literacy in Sudan Project (BLSP), working with refugees in camps and settlements across Northern Sudan.
- The Building Capacity at Kyambogo University Project, working towards improvements in teacher education in Uganda by providing access to quality teacher training.
- Various other projects.
