= Dennis Marsden =

Dennis Marsden (25 June 1933 – 6 September 2009) was a British sociologist based at the University of Essex. Educated at St Catharine's College, Cambridge, he was the co-author (with Brian Jackson) of Education and the Working Class (1961), and the author of Mothers Alone: Poverty and the Fatherless Family (1969). He was made an honorary Fellow of the University of Chichester in 2002.
