= Peter Willmott (sociologist) =

Peter Willmott (18 September 1923 – 8 April 2000) was a British sociologist who along with Michael Young founded the Institute for Community Studies. His studies of family life and housing influenced both social policy and the development of applied social research in Britain after the Second World War.

== Early life ==
Willmott was born at Adderbury, near Banbury, Oxfordshire, to Benjamin Merriman Willmott, an automobile engineer and part-owner of a small motor-repair workshop and garage who also ran a rural one-bus service, and Dorothy Nellie Godden (née Weymouth; d. 1927). After his mother's death, Willmott's family (he, his father, and an aunt and her children) moved to Luton, where Willmott became an engineering apprentice in a car factory. During the Second World War, Willmott was a "Bevan Boy", working in a mine in the Rhondda Valley until developing nystagmus, precipitated perhaps by the always-poor condition of his eyes, and being declared unfit for further mining work. He then worked for the Quakers in the Friends Relief Service and Friends' Ambulance Unit, until gaining a place to study economics and politics as a mature student at Ruskin College, Oxford.

== Career ==
In 1947, Willmott contacted his future collaborator Michael Young regarding a Labour party pamphlet produced by the latter; he subsequently worked for the party research department. Whilst working on his first book with Young, Family and Kinship in East London (published in 1957), Willmott and his wife lived for three years in the attic of the Institute of Community Studies at Bethnal Green. Their sons' attendance at local schools allowed for the observation of the people of the area, "Phyllis... collecting them at the school gates and chatting to other mums..." Subsequent books by Willmott and Young included Family and Class in a London Suburb (1960) and The Symmetrical Family (1973). In 1963, Willmott produced his first solo book, The Evolution of a Community, followed by Adolescent Boys of East London in 1966.

Over the course of his career, Willmott was a professor at the University of Paris, the University of London and the University of California.

== Personal life ==
Willmott married Phyllis Noble in 1948, having met her when he was working at a Methodist homeless hostel and she was looking for shelter for a tramp. She was a medical social worker, former bank clerk, and served in the Women's Auxiliary Air Force during the Second World War, and would herself become a sociologist and lecturer on social policy, including as a research assistant for Richard Titmuss and for the Institute of Community Studies. She was an assiduous diarist (later a published autobiographer), and was her husband's "collaborator and chief support". They had two sons, Lewis and Michael.
