= Peter Hall (urbanist) =

Town planner, urbanist and geographer

Sir Peter Hall FBA
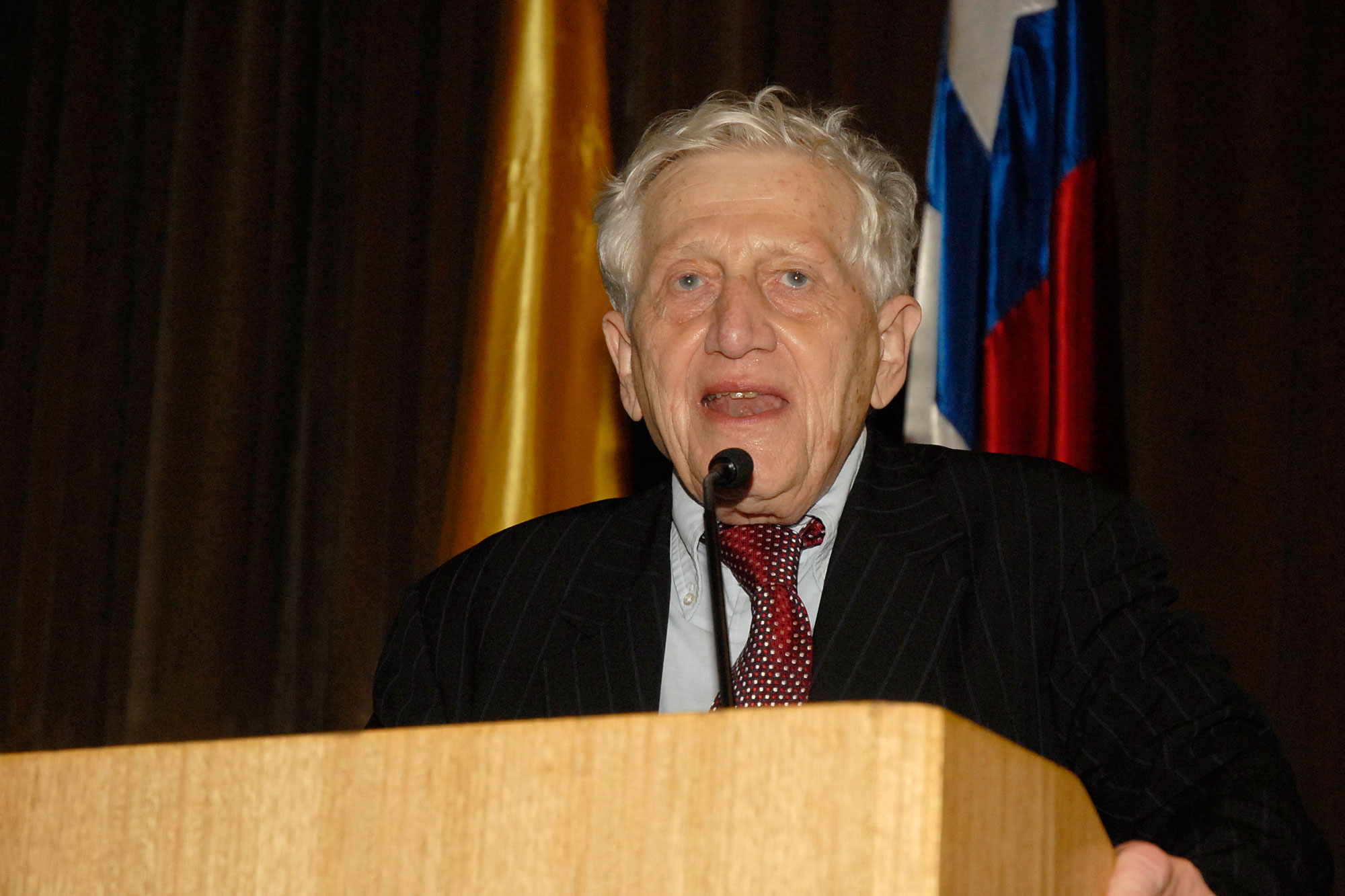
- Hall at Pontificia Universidad Católica de Chile

Chairman of the Fabian Society
- In office 1971–1972
- Preceded by: Jeremy Bray
- Succeeded by: Anthony Lester

Personal details
- Born: Peter Geoffrey Hall; 19 March 1932 Hampstead, London, England
- Died: 30 July 2014 (aged 82) London, England
- Education: St Catharine's College, Cambridge
- Occupation: urban geographer, town planner
- Known for: World Cities ranking, urban planning history, city regions, enterprise zones

Sir Peter Geoffrey Hall FBA (19 March 1932 – 30 July 2014) was an English town planner, urbanist and geographer. He was the Bartlett Professor of Planning and Regeneration at The Bartlett, University College London and president of both the Town and Country Planning Association and the Regional Studies Association. Hall was one of the most prolific and influential urbanists of the twentieth century.

He was known internationally for his studies and writings on the economic, demographic, cultural and management issues that face cities around the globe. Hall was for many years a planning and regeneration adviser to successive UK governments. He was Special Adviser on Strategic Planning to the British government (1991–94) and a member of the Office of the Deputy Prime Minister's Urban Task Force (1998–1999). Hall is considered by many to be the father of the industrial enterprise zone concept, adopted by countries worldwide to develop industry in disadvantaged areas.

== Biography ==
Hall was born in Hampstead, north London, England. In 1940, his family moved to Blackpool, when his father, a clerical officer in the pensions service, was relocated. Hall attended Blackpool Grammar School and then graduated from St Catharine's College, Cambridge, with a master's degree and Doctorate in Geography before starting his academic career in 1957 as lecturer at Birkbeck College, University of London.

Hall was married to Carla Wartenberg from 1962 to 1966, and Magdalena Mróz from 1967 until his death. He died in London on 30 July 2014 at the age of 82 and his ashes were interred in Highgate Cemetery. There are many obituaries to his career and impact.

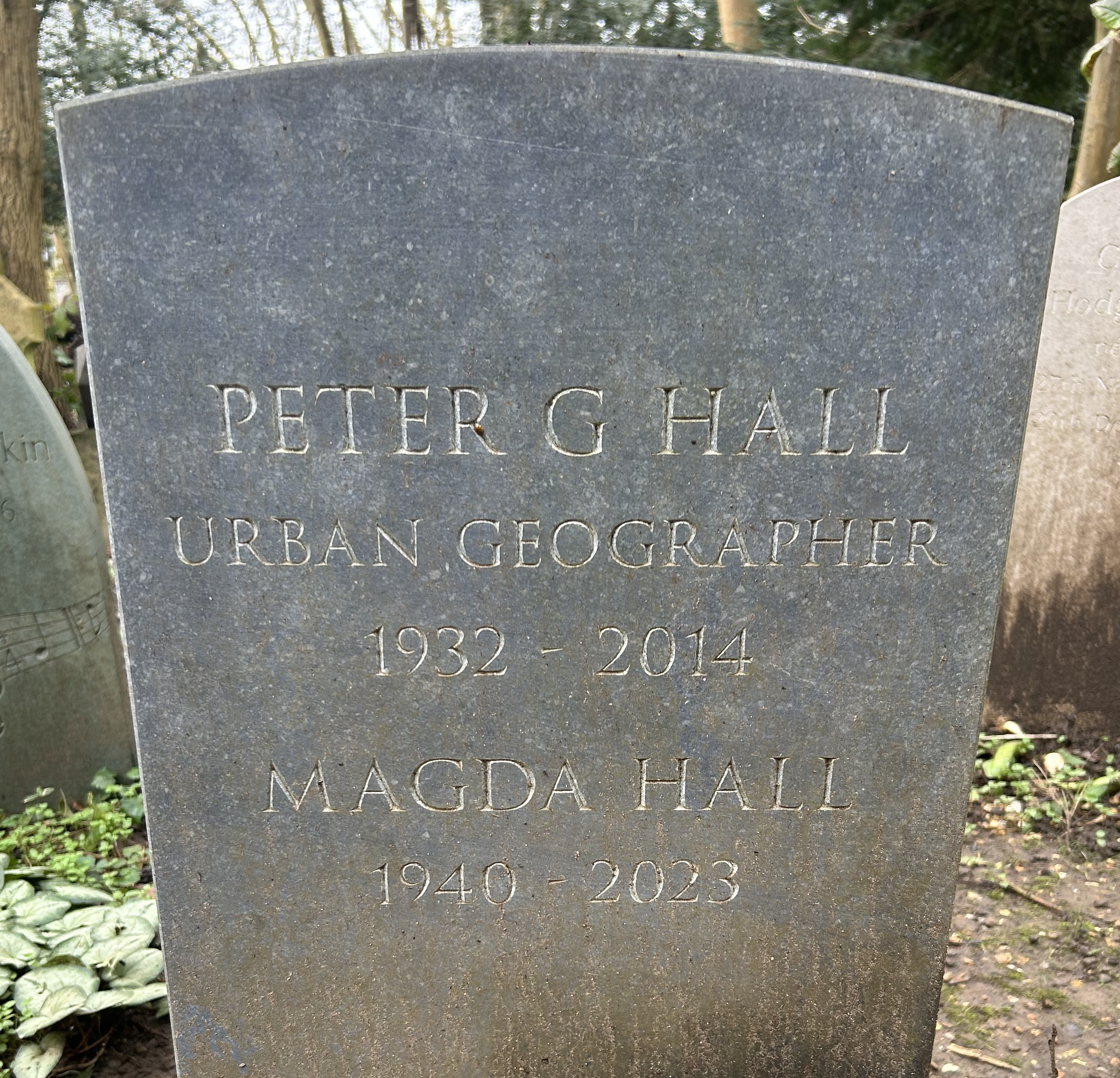
Grave of Peter Hall in Highgate Cemetery

== Academic work ==
In a 1977 address to the Royal Town Planning Institute, Hall put forth the idea of a "Freeport" within a city, a concept that would come to be known as an Enterprise Zone. Enterprise Zones were to be open to immigration of capital and people, without taxes or bureaucracy, modeled after Hong Kong in the 1950s. In practice, Enterprise Zones became areas where taxes were waived and development highly subsidized.

In his final years, Hall strongly perceived that British planners had fallen behind their European counterparts. His last book Good Cities: Better Lives and last book chapter "The Strange Death of British Planning: And How to Bring About a Miraculous Revival", both published in 2014, stress this point and seek to direct attention to planning examples from mainland Europe. His vision of clusters of existing towns and new garden cities to form new dynamic city regions in the north-west, the Midlands and the south-east of England won his team a commendation in the Wolfson Economics Prize competition in May 2014.

== Honours and awards ==
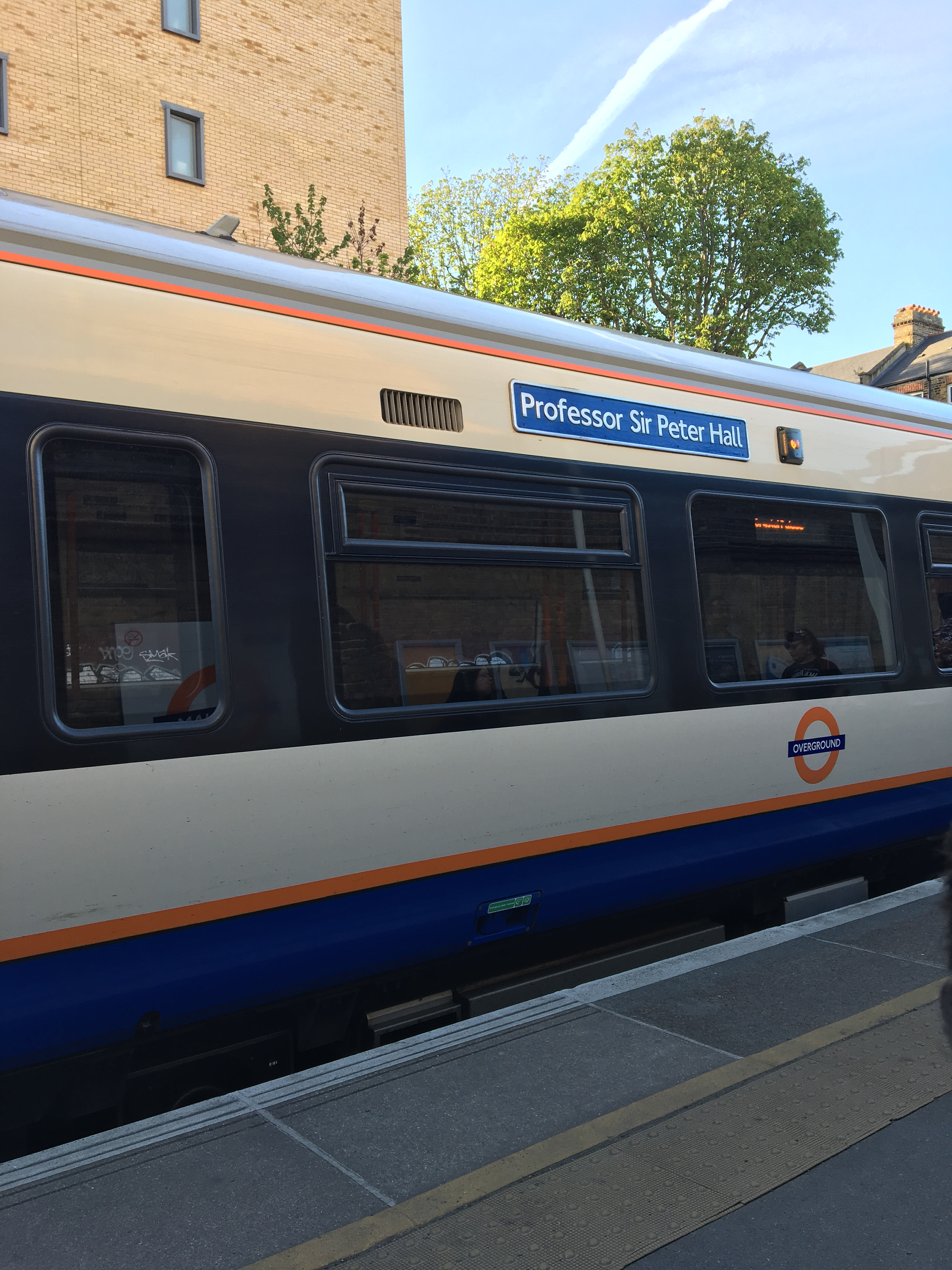
The Professor Sir Peter Hall Overground train

Hall was knighted in 1998 for services to the Town and Country Planning Association. He was awarded the Vautrin Lud International Geography Prize in 2001; the Royal Town Planning Institute Gold Medal and the Founder's Medal of the Royal Geographical Society for distinction in research in 2003; and the Balzan Prize for the Social and Cultural History of Cities since the Beginning of the 16th Century in 2005. He won the last award "for his unique contribution to the history of ideas about urban planning, his acute analysis of the physical, social and economic problems of modern cities and his powerful historical investigations into the cultural creativity of city life." He also won the Regional Studies Prize for Overall Contribution to the Field of Regional Studies in 2008.

Hall also received an Honorary Doctorate from Heriot-Watt University in 2002.

On 30 April 2015, Transport for London dedicated a train in recognition of his contribution to London's transport infrastructure. The train, Number 378 204, is a five-carriage London Overground Class 378 train.

== Publications ==
=== Books ===
- Peter Hall (2013) Good Cities, Better Lives: How Europe Discovered the Lost Art of Urbanism. London: Routledge. ISBN 978-1134545742
- Peter Hall (2007) London Voices, London Lives: Tales from a Working Capital. Bristol: Policy Press. ISBN 978-1861349835
- Nick Buck, Ian Gordon, Peter Hall, Michael Harloe, and Mark Kleinman (2002) Working Capital: Life and Labour in Contemporary London. London: Routledge. ISBN 978-0415279321
- Peter Hall, Ulrich Pfeiffer (2000) Urban Future 21: a Global Agenda for Twenty-First Century Cities. London: Routledge. (updated 2013). ISBN 978-0415240758
- Peter Hall, Colin Ward (1998) Sociable Cities: Legacy of Ebenezer Howard. Chichester: John Wiley & Sons. ISBN 978-0471985051
- Peter Hall (1998) Cities in Civilization: Culture, Technology, and Urban Order. London: Weidenfeld & Nicolson; New York: Pantheon Books. ISBN 978-0394587325
- Peter Hall, Manuel Castells (1994) Technopoles of the World: The Making of 21st-Century Industrial Complexes. London: Routledge. ISBN 978-0394587325
- Ann Markusen, Peter Hall, Scott Campbell, and Sabina Deitrick (1991) The Rise of the Gunbelt: The Military Remapping of Industrial America. New York: Oxford University Press. ISBN 978-0195066487
- Peter Hall (1989) London 2001 London: Unwin Hyman. ISBN 978-0044451617
- Peter Hall (1988) Cities of Tomorrow: An Intellectual History of Urban Planning and Design in the Twentieth Century Oxford: Blackwell Publishing. Reprinted 1988. Updated 1996, 2002, 2014. ISBN 978-1118456477
- Peter Hall and Paschal Preston (1988) The Carrier Wave: New Information Technology and the Geography of Innovation 1846–2003. London: Unwin Hyman. ISBN 978-0044450818
- Peter Hall, Michael J. Breheny, Ronald McQuaid, and Douglas Hart (1987) Western Sunrise: The Genesis and Growth of Britain's Major High Tech Corridor. London: Unwin Hyman. ISBN 978-0043381427
- Peter Hall, Ann Markusen and Amy K. Glasmeier (1986) High-Tech America: The What, How, Where and Why of the Sunrise Industries. Boston: Allen & Unwin. ISBN 978-0043381397
- Michael J. Breheny, Douglas A. Hart, and Peter Hall (1986) Eastern Promise? Development Prospects for the M11 Corridor. Spatial and Economic Associates, Faculty of Urban and Regional Studies, University of Reading.
- Peter Hall and Carmen Hass-Klau (1985) Can Rail save the City? The Impact of Rail Rapid Transit and Pedestrianisation on British and German Cities. Aldershot: Gower Publishing. ISBN 978-0566009471
- Peter Hall and Dennis Hay (1980) Growth Centres in the European Urban System. London: Heinemann. ISBN 978-0435353803
- Peter Hall (1980) Great Planning Disasters. London: Weidenfeld. ISBN 978-0520046078
- Peter Hall (1975) Urban and Regional Planning. Harmondsworth/London: Penguin. Reprinted 1982; Newton Abbott, David and Charles, 1975; London: Routledge, 1992, 2002, fifth edition 2010 with Mark Tewdwr-Jones. ISBN 978-0415566544
- Marion Clawson and Peter Hall (1973) Planning and Urban Growth: An Anglo-American Comparison. Baltimore: Johns Hopkins. ISBN 978-0801814969
- Peter Hall, with Ray Thomas, Harry Gracey, and Roy Drewett (1973) The Containment of Urban England. London: George Allen & Unwin Ltd.; Beverley Hills: Sage Publications Inc. (Two volumes. Vol. 1: "Urban and Metropolitan Growth Processes or Megalopolis Denied"; Vol. 2: "The Planning System: Objectives, Operations, Impacts") ISBN 978-0043520666
- Peter Hall (1966) The World Cities. London: World University Library, Weidenfeld & Nicolson. (French, German, Italian, Spanish and Swedish translations published simultaneously) Reprinted 1977, 1983.
- Peter Hall (1963) London 2000. London, Faber & Faber. Reprinted 1969, 1971.

=== Edited volumes ===
- Peter Hall and Kathy Pain (eds.) (2006) Polycentric Metropolis: Learning from Mega-city Regions in Europe. London, Sterling, VA: Earthscan. ISBN 978-1844077472
- Michael J. Breheny and Peter Hall (eds.) 1999. The people: where will they work? National report of the TCPA Regional Inquiry into Housing Need and Provision in England. Town and Country Planning Association.
- Michael J. Breheny and Peter Hall (eds.) 1996. The people: where will they go? National report of the TCPA Regional Inquiry into Housing Need and Provision in England. Town and Country Planning Association.
- Peter Hall and Ann Markusen (eds.) (1985). Silicon Landscapes. Boston: Allen & Unwin. ISBN 978-0043381236
- Peter Hall (ed.) (1981) The Inner City in Context. London: Heinemann. ISBN 978-0435357177
- Peter Hall (ed.) (1977) Europe 2000. London: Duckworth. ISBN 978-0715609873

=== Book chapters ===
- Peter Hall. The Strange Death of British Planning: And How to Bring About a Miraculous Revival. In: Manns, J, (ed.) Kaleidoscope City: Reflections on Planning and London. (56–62). Birdcage Print: London (2014).
- Peter Hall and Colomb, C. In: Hutchinson, R, (ed.) Encyclopedia of Urban Studies. (340–341). Sage: London (2010). ISBN 978-1412914321
- Peter Hall. The United Kingdom's Experience in Revitalizing Inner Cities. In: Ingram G and Hong Y-H (ed.) Land Policies and their Outcomes: Proceedings of the 2006 Land Policy Conference. (259–283). Lincoln Institute of Land Policy: Cambridge, Mass (2007).
- Peter Hall. Delineating Urban Territories: Is this a Relevant Issue? In: Cattan N (ed.) Cities and Networks in Europe: A Critical Approach of Polycentrism. (3–14). Éditions John Libbey Eurotext: Montrouge (2007). ISBN 978-2742006779
- Peter Hall. From Coronation to Jubilee. In: Buonfino A and Mulgan G (ed.) Porcupines in Winter: The Pleasures and Pains of Living Together in Modern Britain. (16–22). Young Foundation: London (2006). ISBN 978-1905551002
- Peter Hall. Why Some Cities Flourish while Others Languish. In: UN-Habitat (ed.) The State of the World's Cities Report, 2006/2007. (13). UN-Habitat/Earthscan: London (2006).
- Peter Hall. What is the Future of Capital Cities? In: Gordon DLA (ed.) Planning Twentieth Century Capital Cities. (270–274). (2006). ISBN 978-0415280617
- Peter Hall. The Land Fetish: Densities and London Planning. In: Kochan B (ed.) London: Bigger and Better? (84–93). (2006).

=== Pamphlets ===
- Peter Hall. (1980) A radical agenda for London. London: Fabian Society.

Party political offices
Preceded by Jeremy Bray	Chairman of the Fabian Society; 1971 – 1972	Succeeded by Anthony Lester
