= Michael Young, Baron Young of Dartington =

British sociologist and politician (1915–2002)

The Right Honourable The Lord Young of Dartington PC HonFBA

Member of the House of Lords
- Lord Temporal
- Life peerage 20 March 1978 – 14 January 2002

Personal details
- Born: Michael Dunlop Young; 9 August 1915 Manchester, England
- Died: 14 January 2002 (aged 86) London, England
- Resting place: Highgate Cemetery, London, England
- Party: Labour (until 1981; 1989–2002)
- Other political affiliations: SDP (1981–1988) 'Continuing' SDP (1988–1989)
- Spouses: Joan Lawton (m. 1945; div. 1960); Sasha Moorsom (m. 1961; died 1993); Dorit Uhlemann (m. 1995)
- Children: 6, including Toby
- Education: London School of Economics
- Awards: Albert Medal (1992)

Michael Dunlop Young, Baron Young of Dartington (9 August 1915 – 14 January 2002), was a British sociologist, social activist and left-wing politician. Young was an urbanist, known as an academic researcher, polemicist and institution-builder.

During his career, Young was influential in shaping the policy and ideology of the Labour Party. As secretary of the policy committee of the Labour Party, he was responsible for drafting Let Us Face the Future, Labour's manifesto for the 1945 general election. Young was a leading advocate for social reform, and in that capacity he founded or helped to found a number of organisations. These include the Consumers' Association, Which? magazine, the National Consumer Council, the Open University, the Institute for Community Studies, the National Extension College, the Open College of the Arts and Language Line, a telephone-interpreting business.

== Early life and education ==
Young was born in Manchester, the son of Ernest Gibson Young, an Australian violinist and music critic, and Edith Hermia Dunlop, an Irish Bohemian painter and actress. According to Michael's son, Toby, Gibson was a "ne'er-do-well", and "the only silver his forebears possessed was what they were able to steal from the gentry."

Young grew up in Melbourne. He returned to England at the age of eight, shortly before the end of his parents' marriage. There he attended several schools, eventually entering Dartington Hall, a new progressive school in Devon, in the 1920s. He had a long association with the small school, as student, trustee, deputy chairman and historian. He studied economics at the London School of Economics (BScEcon, MA), then became a barrister when he applied to be called to the Bar in 1939.

Young began studying for a PhD at the LSE in 1952. His thesis, dated 1955, was titled "A study of the extended family in East London".

== Social research and community activism ==
During the Second World War, Young served as director of the Political and Economic Planning think tank and became director of research for the Labour Party, where he wrote the manifesto for the 1945 general election and the vast speakers' handbook. He served under the Labour government led by Clement Attlee. In 1947, he called for the establishment of a Social Science Research Council and became its first director 17 years later. He left the Labour Party in 1950, saying the party had run out of ideas.

Young's studies of housing and local government policy in East London, which developed from his doctoral thesis, left him disillusioned with the state of community relations and local Labour councillors. This prompted him to found the Institute of Community Studies, which was his principal vehicle for exploring his ideas of social reform. Its basic tenet was to give people more say in running their lives and institutions. Lise Butler argues that the Institute drew upon existing bodies of research in social psychology and sociology to highlight the relevance of the extended family in modern society and to offer a model of socialist citizenship, solidarity and mutual support not tied to productive work. Young promoted the supportive kinship networks of the urban working class, and an idealized conception of the relationships between women, to suggest that family had been overlooked by the left and should be reclaimed as a progressive force. The goal was to strengthen the working-class family as a model for cooperative socialism.

He also founded the Mutual Aid Centre at this time. Young co-authored (with Peter Willmott) Family and Kinship in East London, documenting and analysing the social costs of rehousing a tight-knit community in a suburban housing estate (known affectionately by sociologists as Fakinel and invariably pronounced with a cockney accent). (Note: In Cockney fa.kɪ.neəl sounds like an expletive)

In 1958, Young wrote the influential satire The Rise of the Meritocracy for the Fabian Society, which refused to publish it. The book critiques the concept of "meritocracy" as unachievable and undesirable, describing a dystopian future of a society in which "IQ + effort" have replaced all other values.

Although unwilling to maintain a conventional academic career, Young was a fellow of Churchill College, Cambridge, from 1961 to 1966, and president of Birkbeck, University of London, from 1989 to 1992.

== Organisational activity ==
An energetic and resourceful man, Young established many new organisations with the aim of providing "bottom-up" practical help to ordinary citizens. In the 1950s and 1960s he helped to found the Consumers' Association and the National Consumer Council, claiming that "politics will become less and less the politics of production, and more and more the politics of consumption," presenting the ideas in a booklet, The Chipped White Cups Of Dover (1960).

In 1960, he started the Advisory Centre for Education the National Extension College and, with Peter Laslett, a dawn university on Anglia Television, which became prototypes of the Open University which Harold Wilson launched in 1964, building on his vision.

In the mid-1980s, Young co-founded International Alert, together with Leo Kuper and Martin Ennals. Later on that decade, in 1987, he founded the Open College of the Arts, confounding critics who maintained that the arts could not be taught by distance methods. He also founded Language Line, a telephone interpreting business, to enable non-English-speaking people to have equal access to public services. He fostered the work of many younger researchers and "social entrepreneurs," and founded the School for Social Entrepreneurs in 1997. Aspects of Young's work were developed by the Young Foundation, created from the merger of his Institute of Community Studies and his Mutual Aid Centre, under the direction of Geoff Mulgan.

Throughout his life, and particularly in later life, Young was concerned for older people. In 1982 he co-founded the University of the Third Age with Peter Laslett and Eric Midwinter, and Linkage, bringing together older people without grandchildren and young people without grandparents. In 2001 he co-founded the charity Grandparents Plus to champion the role of the wider family in children's lives.

== Later political career ==
Although he maintained steadfast egalitarian convictions, Young accepted a life peerage on 20 March 1978, taking the Labour whip and the title Baron Young of Dartington, of Dartington in the County of Devon. His many projects required frequent travel to London, and the peerage offered free rail travel and attendance allowance at a time when he had run out of money.

In 1981, Young defected from Labour to the Social Democratic Party (SDP), and was one of 100 supporters whose names were published alongside the SDP's founding statement, the Limehouse Declaration, that February. Although hitherto largely aloof from the factionalism then devouring Labour, Young's disregard for the statist and trade union-oriented aspects of its post-war social-democratic philosophy meant he was receptive to the idea of a new progressive party forming in its stead (he had already tentatively advocated the formation of a "Consumers' Party" in The Chipped White Cups of Dover). Upon joining the SDP, he became a member of the party's policy committee and director of its in-house think tank, The Tawney Society.

An associate of the SDP's second leader, David Owen, Young refused to back the party's merger with the Liberal Party in 1988 and instead followed Owen into the 'continuing' SDP. A year later he chose to return to Labour after, in Owen's words, the party's "big switch on the EEC, market economics and Trident." Young remained sceptical of Labour's ability to win the next election and believed that it still had to face up to the task of modernising socialism, which had, he said, "lagged so badly since Tony Crosland died."

According to Young's friend Eric Midwinter, "All his thought, all his incisive writing, all his brilliantly conceived schemes, all his astutely handled initiatives were guided by a salient method. He was a utopian socialist. His thinking stemmed from the views of 19th-century radicals like Robert Owen, Saint-Simon or Charles Fourier, with their hatred of massive institutionalism, be it in the hands of the public authority or of the large commercial company."

== Personal life ==
Young married three times. In 1945 he married Joan Lawton, with whom he had two sons and a daughter. They later divorced, and in December 1961 he married Sasha (daughter of Raisley Stewart Moorsom and a descendant of Admiral Sir Robert Moorsom), a novelist, sculptor and painter with whom he had a daughter (who was born before their marriage) and a son, the journalist and writer Toby Young. Young and Moorsom worked together on several projects, including in the townships of South Africa. Moorsom died in 1993 and in 1995 Young married 37-year-old milliner Dorit Uhlemann, with whom he had a daughter Gaia, who died in July 2021 aged 25.

== Death ==
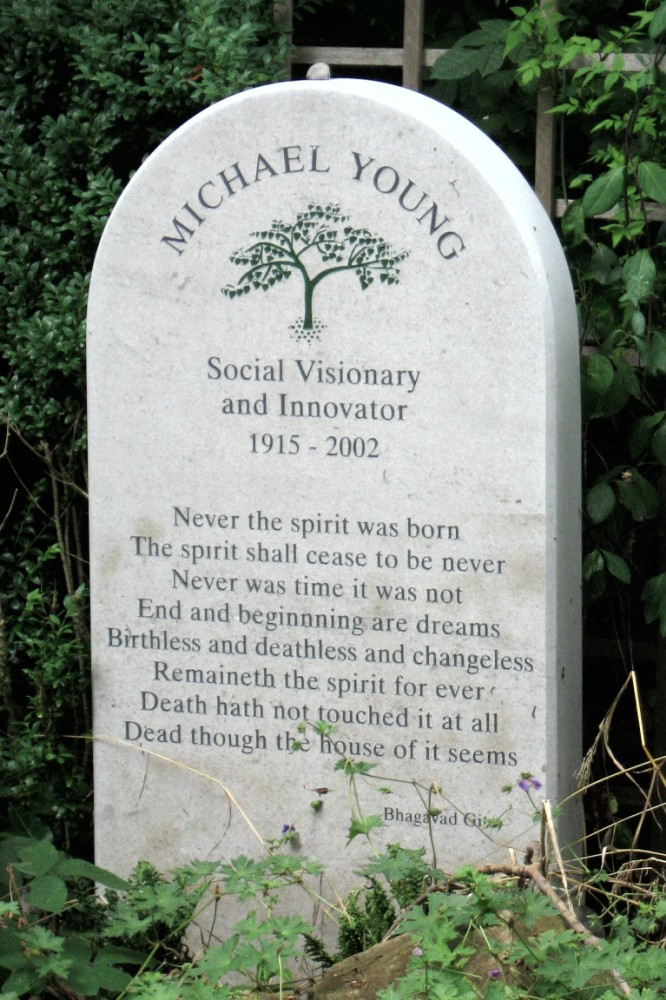
Grave in Highgate Cemetery, London

Young died on 14 January 2002, aged 86. He is buried in Highgate Cemetery, north London.

== List of institutions established with the involvement of Michael Young ==
- Institute of Community Studies, 1954 (director 1954–2002, now part of the Young Foundation)
- Consumers' Association, 1957 (chairman 1957–65, president 1965–93)
- Research Institute for Disabled Consumers, 1963 (chairman 1963)
- South African Committee for Higher Education, 1959 (founding sponsor)
- Botswana Extension College, 1959
- Lesotho Distance Teaching Centre, 1959
- Advisory Centre for Education, 1959
- Bethnal Green Exports Ltd., 1964–66
- Social Science Research Council, 1965 (chairman 1965–68)
- Thameside Research and Development Group, 1967–69
- National Consumer Council, 1975 (chairman 1975–77)
- National Extension College, 1962 (chairman 1962–71)
- Open University, 1964
- National Innovations Centre, 1968–74
- Institute for Social Studies in Medical Care, 1970–94
- International Extension College, 1971–2006
- Social Audit, 1972
- Mutual Aid Centre, 1977 (now part of the Young Foundation)
- Commuter Study Clubs, 1980
- International Alert, 1981
- University of the Third Age, 1982
- Tawney Society, 1982–88
- College of Health, 1983
- Association for the Social Study of Time, 1983
- Argo Venture, 1984–95
- Healthline, 1986
- Open College of the Arts, 1987 (chairman 1987–91)
- Centre for Electoral Choice, 1987
- Centre for Educational Choice, 1988
- LinkAge, 1988–95
- Samizdat, 1988–90
- Open School, 1989
- Language Line, 1990
- A Secondary Education Curriculum for Adults (ASECA), 1991 p35
- Adult Basic Education Programme (ABEP), 1991
- South African Institute of Distance Education (SAIDE), 1991
- Education Extra, 1992
- National Association for the Education of Sick Children, 1993
- Tower Hamlets Independent News Service (THINK), 1993–94
- National Funerals College, 1994
- Family Covenant Association, 1994
- The School for Social Entrepreneurs, 1997
- Phoenix Education Trust, 2001

== Bibliography ==
- Will the War Make Us Poorer? [with Sir Henry Noel Young] (1943)
- Civil Aviation (1944)
- The Trial of Adolf Hitler (1944)
- There's Work for All [with Theodor Prager] (1945)
- Labour's Plan for Plenty (1947)
- What is a Socialised Industry? (1947)
- Small Man, Big World: A Discussion of Socialist Democracy (1949)
- Fifty Million Unemployed (1952)
- Study of the Extended Family in East London (1955)
- Family and Kinship in East London [with Peter Willmott] (1957)
- The Rise of the Meritocracy (1958)
- Chipped White Cups of Dover: A Discussion of the Possibility of a New Progressive Party (1960)
- Family and Class in a London Suburb [with Peter Willmott] (1960)
- New Look at Comprehensive Schools [with Michael Armstrong] (1964)
- Innovation and Research in Education (1967)
- Forecasting and the Social Sciences [ed.] (1968)
- Hornsey Plan: A Role for Neighbourhood Councils in the New Local Government (1971)
- Is Equality a Dream? (1972)
- Lifeline Telephone Service for the Elderly: An Account of a Pilot Project in Hull [with Peter G. Gregory] (1972)
- Learning Begins at Home: A Study of a Junior School and its Parents [with Patrick McGeeney] (1973)
- Symmetrical Family: A Study of Work and Leisure in the London Region [with Peter Willmott] (1973)
- Mutual Aid in a Selfish Society: A Plea for Strengthening the Co-operative Movement [with Marianne Rigge] (1979)
- Building Societies and the Consumer: A Report [with Marianne Rigge] (1981)
- Report from Hackney: A Study of an Inner-City Area [with others] (1981)
- The Elmhirsts of Dartington: The Creation of an Utopian Community (1982)
- Inflation, Unemployment and the Remoralisation of Society (1982)
- Up the Hill to Cowley Street: Views of Tawney Members on SDP Policy [ed. with Tony Flower and Peter Hall] (1982)
- Revolution from Within: Cooperatives and Cooperation in British Industry [with Marianne Rigge] (1983)
- Social Scientist as Innovator (1983)
- To Merge or Not to Merge? (1983)
- Development of New Growth Areas: Workers' Cooperatives and Their Environment: Comparative Analysis with a View to Job Creation: Support for Worker Cooperatives in the United Kingdom, Republic of Ireland, Netherlands [with Marianne Rigge] (1985)
- Metronomic Society: Natural Rhythms and Human Timetables (1988)
- Rhythms of society [ed. with Tom Schuller] (1988)
- Campaign for Children's After-School Clubs: The Case for Action [with Matthew Owen] (1991)
- Life After Work: The Arrival of the Ageless Society [with Tom Schuller, Johnston Birchall and Gwyneth Vernon) (1991)
- Governing London [with Jerry White] (1996)
- The New East End: Kinship, Race and Conflict [with Geoff Dench and Kate Gavron] (2006)

== Notes ==
Party political offices
Preceded by Morgan Phillips	Secretary of the Research Department of the Labour Party; 1945–1947	Succeeded by Wilfred Fienburgh
