= Karen Dunnell =

British national statistician

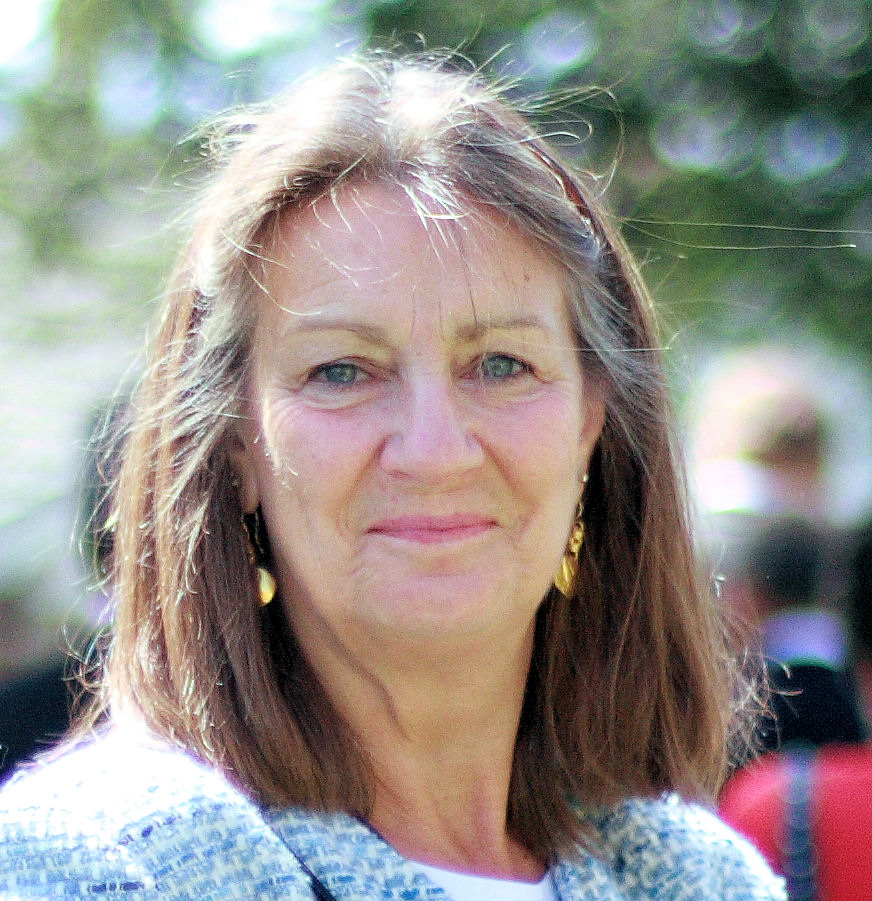
- Karen Dunnell, former UK National Statistician, April 2008
- Born: 16 June 1946 (age 80); Los Angeles, California (USA)
- Other name: Hope Williamson
- Education: Maidstone Grammar School for Girls, London Bedford College London
- Occupations: Medical sociologist, Civil servant
- Employer(s): Institute of Community Studies, Department of Community Medicine, St Thomas's Hospital Medical School, London, Office of Population Censuses and Surveys (OPCS)
- Notable work: Chaired the Society for Social Medicine
- Spouse(s): Keith Dunnell (1969–76), Michael Adler (1979–94)
- Awards: Honorary Doctorate degree (July 2008)

Dame Karen Hope Dunnell, DCB, FAcSS (née Williamson; born 16 June 1946) is an American-born British medical sociologist and civil servant. She was National Statistician and Chief Executive of the Office for National Statistics of the United Kingdom and head of the Government Statistical Service from 1 September 2005 until retiring on 28 August 2009. Since its inception in 2008, she was also the Chief Executive of the UK Statistics Authority. She now has a range of non-executive roles including membership of Pricewaterhouse Coopers Public Interest Body, Trustee of National Heart Forum, and member of the Court of Governors, University of Westminster.

== Background ==
Born Karen Hope Williamson in Los Angeles, California (USA), she moved to Britain when she was a young child and was educated at Maidstone Grammar School for Girls and Bedford College, London.

Her father was a US serviceman during World War II and her mother, who was English, was a teacher. Karen Dunnell has been married twice: to Keith Dunnell (1969–76) and Michael Adler (1979–94). She has two adult daughters by her second marriage and two grandchildren. She lives in London and has a home in the Var department in the Provence-Alpes-Côte d'Azur region of southeastern France.

== Career ==
Karen Williamson studied sciences at school because she wanted to go into medicine. However, a growing interest in politics and society led her to study sociology at Bedford College, London, from where she graduated in 1967. She began her career as a health care researcher with the Institute of Community Studies, where much of her work involved healthcare surveys, and, in 1972, she wrote a book, Medicine Takers, Prescribers and Hoarders with Ann Cartwright.

This established a measure of morbidity and the relationship between medicines acquired through the NHS and over-the-counter. Dunnell then joined the Department of Community Medicine, St Thomas's Hospital Medical School, London, working on multi-disciplinary projects alongside doctors, social scientists, statisticians and economists, including a major project that measured the cost of caring for people with severe disabilities in the community compared with the cost of caring for them in institutions.

She joined the Office of Population Censuses and Surveys (OPCS) in 1974, as a social survey officer in the Survey Division, where she stayed for 15 years, working on, among other things, two major surveys. One of these was the UK's contribution to the World Fertility Survey, published as a book, Family Formation (1976). This measured cohabitation for the first time and first asked the question, now a standard, "At what age did you first have sexual intercourse?" The other studied the work of community nurses, using an intensive survey combined with diary-keeping. She was promoted to assistant director, overseeing all health surveys in the OPCS. These included surveys on drinking and smoking and a major survey on disability that established what proportion of people in different age groups had different disabilities. She was responsible, in this post, for liaising with the Department of Health.

In 1990, she moved from working with health surveys in the OPCS to medical statistics. When OPCS merged with the Central Statistical Office to form the ONS in 1996, she became Director of Demography and Health Statistics, working on general practice statistics and inequalities in health, and established the Health Statistics Quarterly journal. In 1999, she moved to a central post responsible for launching National Statistics and dealing with the arrival of Len Cook, the first National Statistician, in 2000. She was promoted to Group Director in Social Statistics in 2000, managing health, demography, population, labour market and social reporting and was temporarily promoted to the Board of the ONS in 2001 in the run-up to the 2001 census. A major reorganisation, which divided the activities of ONS into 'sources' and 'analysis', followed and Dunnell was given the job of setting up the new "Sources" Directorate, bringing together household and business surveys, the infrastructure that supported them, the statistical modernisation programme and planning for the 2011 Census. She took up this post on the ONS Executive in 2002.

=== National Statistician ===
Karen Dunnell was appointed National Statistician and Director of the Office for National Statistics from 1 September 2005 at a time when the government was being criticised for the quality, credibility and uses to which it put the statistics generated both by ONS and by governments departments. Soon afterwards, Gordon Brown, then Chancellor of the Exchequer, announced that, following the success of the idea of independence for the Monetary Policy Committee of the Bank of England as a means of gaining trust in its interest-rate decisions, a form of independence should be applied to ONS so that its data could also gain public trust. ONS is now accountable to Parliament via a Statistics Board, known as the UK Statistics Authority (UKSA), rather than, as previously, via a Treasury minister. Following the implementation of the Statistics and Registration Service Act 2007, the role of Registrar-General for England and Wales, an ancient additional title, held by the National Statistician since the inception of ONS, was transferred, with the General Register Office for England and Wales, which she also headed, to the Identification and Passport Service in the Home Office

=== Controversy ===
A government policy inherited by Karen Dunnell as National Statistician aroused controversy. Following the efficiency reviews initiated by the Chancellor and Prime Minister (viz. Review of Public Sector Relocation by Sir Michael Lyons, 2003–04, and Releasing Resources to the Front Line, Sir Peter Gershon, 2004), the government adopted a policy, criticised by unions, of dispersal of certain public service posts and functions out of London. The policy was initially applied to ONS during Len Cook's tenure as National Statistician but after Karen Dunnell succeeded to the post, ONS accelerated the policy of relocating the Office for National Statistics away from London and concentrating staff in its offices in Titchfield, near Southampton, and in Newport, South Wales, to which the ONS headquarters has moved. The announcement, in January 2007, of the almost complete closure of the ONS's London offices by 2010 reversed a decision to retain a sizeable office in the capital.

This relocation policy, together with substantial expenditure cutbacks in recent government spending settlements, resulted in disquiet among London-based staff whose representatives reported morale problems and a high staff turnover rate among staff still in London. To set against the risks to data quality of any loss of expertise, especially among London-based staff who were unwilling to move, including analysts in National Accounts and in health statistics, Ms. Dunnell defended ONS implementation of government policy on civil service relocation. In the face of some Bank of England disquiet, reported in 2007 to the Treasury Select Committee, about risks to economic data quality, combined with opposition from London staff (including a lack of confidence in management expressed in a staff survey highlighted by staff unions), she asserted that the ONS Board had agreed a process of managed and gradual change to take account of these risks, building up expertise in Newport before shifting functions there. She also cited the benefits to the local economy, the skills of existing ONS staff in Newport and access to universities and other resources in the region as well as the benefits of operating key functions from a single location.

=== Other roles ===
Outside the OPCS, Dunnell has been a member of the British Sociology Association and was on the committee of its BSA Medical Sociology Group. She later chaired the Society for Social Medicine. She is a Fellow of the Royal Statistical Society, is a visiting professor at the London School of Hygiene. She has been elected to a second term as a visiting fellow at Nuffield College, Oxford.

Dunnell was awarded an Honorary Doctorate degree by Middlesex University in July 2008, was appointed an Honorary Fellow of Cardiff University in July 2009 and was appointed Dame Commander of the Order of the Bath (DCB) in the Queen's Birthday Honours List in June 2009.

Preceded by Len Cook	Director of the Office for National Statistics & National Statistician; 2005–2009	Succeeded by Jil Matheson
