= Office for National Statistics =

United Kingdom government institution

Agency overview
- Formed: 1 April 1996; 30 years ago
- Preceding agencies: Central Statistical Office; Office of Population Censuses and Surveys
- Type: Non-ministerial government department
- Jurisdiction: United Kingdom
- Headquarters: Government Buildings, Cardiff Road, Newport NP10 8XG; 51°34′00″N 03°01′42″W
- Employees: 3,302 (including UK Statistics Authority)
- Annual budget: £206.5 million (2009–2010) (including UK Statistics Authority)
- Agency executives: André Loranger, National Statistician; Darren Tierney, Permanent Secretary
- Parent agency: UK Statistics Authority
- Website: www.ons.gov.uk

- Applies to: United Kingdom; England and Wales (census)
- Relates to: Statistics

Other UK counterparts
- Northern Ireland: Northern Ireland Statistics and Research Agency
- Scotland: National Records of Scotland

The Office for National Statistics (ONS; Welsh: Swyddfa Ystadegau Gwladol) is the executive office of the UK Statistics Authority, a non-ministerial department which reports directly to the UK Parliament.

== Overview ==
The ONS is responsible for the collection and publication of statistics related to the economy, population and society of the United Kingdom; responsibility for some areas of statistics in Scotland, Northern Ireland and Wales is devolved to the devolved governments for those areas. The ONS functions as the executive office of the National Statistician, who is also the UK Statistics Authority's Chief Executive and principal statistical adviser to the UK's National Statistics Institute, (Note: 'National Statistics Institute' and NSI are a standard expression and its acronym used about statistical services in OECD and EU terminology.) and the 'Head Office' of the Government Statistical Service (GSS). Its main office is in Newport near the United Kingdom Intellectual Property Office and Tredegar House, but another significant office is in Titchfield in Hampshire, and a small office is in London. ONS co-ordinates data collection with the respective bodies in Northern Ireland and Scotland, namely NISRA and NRS.

== History ==
The ONS was formed on 1 April 1996 by the merger of the Central Statistical Office (CSO) and the Office of Population Censuses and Surveys (OPCS). Following the Statistics and Registration Service Act 2007, the United Kingdom Statistics Authority became a non-ministerial department on 1 April 2008.

== Purpose and scope ==
ONS produces and publishes a wide range of the information about the United Kingdom that can be used for social and economic policy-making as well as painting a portrait of the country as its population evolves over time. This is often produced in ways that make comparison with other societies and economies possible. Much of the data on which policy-makers depend is produced by ONS through a combination of a decennial population census, samples and surveys and analysis of data generated by businesses and organisations such as the National Health Service and the register of births, marriages and deaths. Its publications, and analyses by other users based on its published data, are reported and discussed daily in the media as the basis for the public understanding of the country in which they live.

=== Applications of data ===
The reliance on some of these data by government (both local and national) makes ONS material central to debates about the determination of priorities, the allocation of resources and for decisions on interest rates or borrowing. The complexity and degree and speed of change in the society, combined with the challenge of measuring some of these (e.g. in relation to longevity, migration or illness patterns or fine movements in inflation or other aspects of national accounts) give rise to periodic debates about some of its indicators and portrayals. Many of these rely on sources which are outside ONS, while some of its own sources need to be supplemented, for example between censuses, by updated but less rigorously obtained information from other sources. Consequently, unexpected or incomplete data or occasional errors or disputes about its analysis can also attract considerable attention. And this helps to show data that is complete.

ONS data can also be used in epidemiologic studies such as survival analysis.

== Independence ==
Gordon Brown, then Chancellor of the Exchequer, announced on 28 November 2005, that the government intended to publish plans in early 2006 to legislate that the ONS and the statistics it generates are independent of government on a model based on the independence of the Monetary Policy Committee of the Bank of England. This was originally a 1997 Labour manifesto commitment and was also the policy of the Liberal Democrat and Conservative parties. Such independence was also sought by the Royal Statistical Society and the Statistics Commission. The National Statistician would be directly accountable to Parliament through a more widely constituted independent governing Statistics Board. The ONS would be a non-ministerial government department so that the staff, including the Director, would remain as civil servants but without being under direct ministerial control. The then National Statistician, Dame Karen Dunnell, stated that legislation would help improve public trust in official statistics (although the ONS already acted independently, as per its own published guidelines, the National Statistics Code of Practice, which set out the key principles and standards that official statisticians, including those in other parts of the government statistical service, were expected to follow and uphold).

The details of the plans for independence were considered in Parliament during the 2006/2007 session and resulted in the Statistics and Registration Service Act 2007. In July 2007, Sir Michael Scholar was nominated by the government to be the three-day-a-week non-executive chairman of the Statistics Board which, with the intention of re-establishing faith in the integrity of government statistics, was to take on statutory responsibility for oversight of UK statistics in April 2008 and oversee the Office for National Statistics; also having a duty to assess all UK government statistics. Following Gordon Brown's announcement of new constitutional arrangements for public appointments, Sir Michael also became, on 18 July, the first such nominee to appear before the House of Commons Treasury Committee and to have his nomination subject to confirmation by the House. On 7 February 2008, following the first meeting of the shadow board, it was announced that it would be known as the UK Statistics Authority (UKSA).

In 2012, Andrew Dilnot replaced Michael Scholar as chair of the Authority.

== Heads of the Office and the National Statistician ==
Since its establishment, ONS has had five Directors: professor Tim Holt; Len Cook; Karen Dunnell; Jil Matheson; and, from October 2012, Glen Watson. Len Cook was the first Director to hold the newly created role of National Statistician. The roles of Director of ONS and National Statistician were combined until 2012 when Jil Matheson continued as National Statistician while Glen Watson became Director of the ONS. John Pullinger replaced Jil Matheson as National Statistician (and Chief Executive of the UK Statistics Authority) in July 2014. Pullinger retired in June 2019 and in October 2019 professor Sir Ian Diamond assumed the role of National Statistician. Emma Rourke moved to the National Statistician role, 9 May 2025, due to Sir Ian's resignation citing health concerns. Rourke later resigned effective from 19 December 2025. On 5 August 2025 Darren Tierney was appointed as the new Permanent Secretary.

== Work ==
The work of the ONS covers the collection of data and the analysis and publication of statistics covering the economy, population, and society of the UK.

Where data is broken down by geographical area, this is usually done by the areas defined in the ONS geographical coding system.

=== Data collection ===
The principal areas of data collection include:

- Agriculture and Environment
- Business and Energy
- Children, Education and Skills
- Crime and Justice
- Economy (ESCoE)
- Government
- Health and Social Care
- Labour Market
- People and Places
- Population
- Travel and Transport

Statisticians are also employed by many other Government departments and agencies, and these statisticians often collect and publish data. They are members of the Government Statistical Service and are the professional responsibility of the head of the service, who is also the National Statistician. Each department has a statistical service Head of Profession. For example, data on Agriculture, Fishing and Forestry comes primarily from the Department for the Environment, Food and Rural Affairs. Along with economic data on which the Treasury and Bank of England rely for decision-making, many of the statistics that receive widespread media attention are issued by the Home Office, the Department of Health, and the Department for Education and Skills. ONS is also responsible for the maintenance of the Inter-Departmental Business Register and the Business Structure Database.

=== Former departments ===
Before the establishment of the UK Statistics Authority, the statistical work of ONS, since June 2000, was scrutinised by the Statistics Commission, an independent body with its own chairman and small staff. This ceased to operate from 1 April 2008. The General Register Office and the post of Registrar-General for England and Wales ceased to be part of ONS from that date but remains subject to ministerial accountability within the Home Office.

=== The Blue Book ===
The annual United Kingdom national accounts are published in an online publication (The Blue Book) by the Office for National Statistics. It records and describes economic activity in the United Kingdom and as such is used by government, banks, academics and industries to formulate the economic and social policies and monitor the economic progress of the United Kingdom. It also allows international comparisons to be made. The Blue Book is published alongside the United Kingdom Balance of Payments – The Pink Book.

=== Education of statisticians ===
The Office for National Statistics collaborates with the University of Southampton in the teaching of an MSc in Official Statistics; the programme has been running since 2003.

=== Virtual Microdata Laboratory ===
The Virtual Microdata Laboratory (VML) was established in 2004 to allow researchers access to business data. It is a secure facility within the Office for National Statistics where both government officials and academic researchers can analyse sensitive, detailed data for statistical purposes. The researchers cannot download the data or take any copies out of the laboratory and the results of the analysis is checked for statistical disclosure.

== Office locations ==
The ONS head office is in the city of Newport, Wales, and it has other offices in 2 Marsham Street in London, Titchfield in Hampshire, the Darlington Economic Campus in Darlington, Heron House in Manchester, Queen Elizabeth House in Edinburgh and Custom House in Belfast. The Family Records Centre in Myddelton Street in Islington, London, moved to the National Archives in Kew in 2008. They also have an Archive Storage site located in Christchurch, Dorset.

=== Former headquarters ===
The London (Pimlico) office was the head office until April 2006 when the corporate headquarters was moved to Newport following the Lyons Review on public sector relocation. Between 2011 and 2022 the London office was located on the 2nd floor of the former Drummond Gate headquarters; since 2022 the London office has been located in 2 Marsham Street.

=== Gradual move of functions to South Wales ===
The ONS asserted that recruitment and training of quality staff in South Wales, where data collection and analysis already took place, would ensure that there was no risk to the quality of its services and that it managed the risks associated with the changes. However, the plan to discontinue statistical activity in London proved controversial amid claims that the shift of functions from London and the closure of the London office would have serious implications for the future of certain sets of statistics. These include health statistics, National Accounts, Retail and Consumer Prices and Labour Market Statistics. These risks were stated to derive from the fact that few of the experienced staff working in these highly technical areas were expected to relocate to Newport, resulting in a substantial loss of expertise and a consequent threat to the continued quality of the statistics. In a submission to the Parliamentary Treasury Sub Committee, the Bank of England expressed concern over the relocation of the ONS to Newport, saying, that "the relocation programme poses serious risks to the maintenance of the quality of macroeconomic data. If substantial numbers of ONS staff are unwilling to relocate, the loss of skilled individuals could have a severe impact on a range of statistics." The director of ONS at the time vigorously defended the implementation of government policy on civil service relocation and the decision to concentrate staff in the three locations outside London.

== Criticism ==
The Office for National Statistics won the 2004 Big Brother Award for the "Most Heinous Government Organisation" from the campaigning organisation Privacy International for its Citizen Information Project. The project is one of several that led the Information Commissioner to warn that there is a danger of the country "sleepwalking" into a surveillance society.

In December 2012 the organisation's new website to provide statistics to the public was described as "a disaster" by members of parliament on the Public Administration Committee. The chair of the UK Statistics Authority said that significant improvements to the website were being made, but admitted that its state at the time made it "difficult to use, difficult to navigate and difficult to search".

In 2016, professor Sir Charles Bean conducted an independent review of UK Economic Statistics. He notes that although there is much criticism of the ONS's performance, particularly of the size and frequency of revisions, that this criticism is "not entirely justified". Following the review, the then-Chair of the Treasury Select Committee, Andrew Tyrie, criticised the ONS for being "out of touch".

In 2019, the ONS admitted that EU migration to the UK may have been underestimated due to methodology of the International Passenger Survey.

In 2025, the ONS suggested that unreliable employment data was a result of smart door bells.

An independent review of the ONS was conducted in 2025 by Sir Robert Devereux. It concluded that "most of the well-publicised problems with core economic statistics are the consequence of ONS's own performance", and noted that an "interest in the new" often took attention away from delivery of important economic statistics, as well as finding inadequacies in planning and budgeting.

== See also ==
- Departments of the United Kingdom Government
- List of national and international statistical services
- National Records of Scotland
- Northern Ireland Statistics and Research Agency
- United Kingdom Censuses
