= Society of Registration Officers =

Former trade union of the United Kingdom

The Society of Registration Officers was a trade union representing officers of the vital registration service in England and Wales. Members provided the local birth, marriage and death registration service, the majority working in local Register Offices.

After decades of campaigning, together with UNISON, the major public service union, the Society finally succeeded in seeing statutory registration officers receive legal employment status in 2007 when, on 1 December of that year, they became employees of their relevant local authority following the enactment of the Statistics and Registration Service Act 2007.

The Society also played a major part in the development of the registration service over many years, working closely with the General Register Office and local authorities. Its membership had an exceedingly close and strong attachment to their work and therefore to the service they delivered to the public.

With the arrival of the long-awaited employment status for the field registration officers the Society, as a trade union, had no further role to play. The majority of its members were also members of UNISON.

On 12 March 2009 a resolution was passed that the Society be dissolved. The Registrar of Trade Unions concurred in January 2010 and the Society of Registration Officers closed for business with the same dignity with which it had vigorously pursued its aims for many decades.
