= Register office (United Kingdom) =

Office recording births, deaths and marriages

A register office, commonly referred to unofficially as a registry office or registrar's office, is an office in the United Kingdom, Republic of Ireland and some Commonwealth countries responsible for the civil registration of births, deaths, marriages, civil partnerships, stillbirths and adoptions.

Historically, local register offices were organised under a General Register Office, with a registrar-general responsible for their administration. A network of local offices provided a public-facing function and were responsible for registrations within their respective areas.

In addition to their role in registration, register offices in the United Kingdom conduct civil marriage and civil partnership ceremonies, as well as other civic ceremonies.

== United Kingdom ==
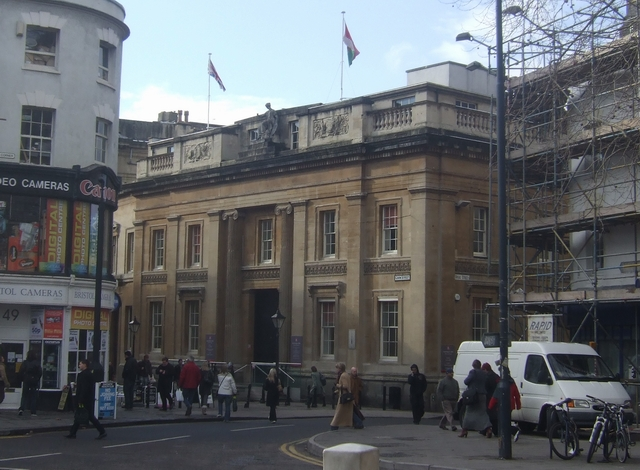
A local register office in Bristol

Register offices were established in England and Wales in 1837, with similar legislation being introduced for Scotland in 1855 and Ireland in 1845.

=== England and Wales ===
In England and Wales, the current registration service is overseen by the Registrar General as part of the General Register Office, part of the Home Office's Identity and Passport Service but provided locally by local authorities.

A register office is the office of the superintendent registrar of the district, in whose custody are all the registers dating back to 1837. Registrations are carried out by a registrar and each registration district will have one or more registrars and each may be responsible for a particular sub-district.

Since 1994, the range of services offered by register offices has expanded so that they may now provide additional celebratory services including statutory citizenship and civil partnership ceremonies and non-statutory ceremonies such as naming and renewal of vows. Civil ceremonies may also take place in local approved premises, including hotels and public buildings.

On 1 December 2007, all registrars and superintendent registrars in England and Wales became employees of the local authorities providing the registration service, having been statutory officers with no legal employment status. This came about as a result of the Statistics and Registration Service Act 2007 following decades of campaigning by the trade unions that represented registration officers in England and Wales, the Society of Registration Officers and UNISON.

=== Scotland ===
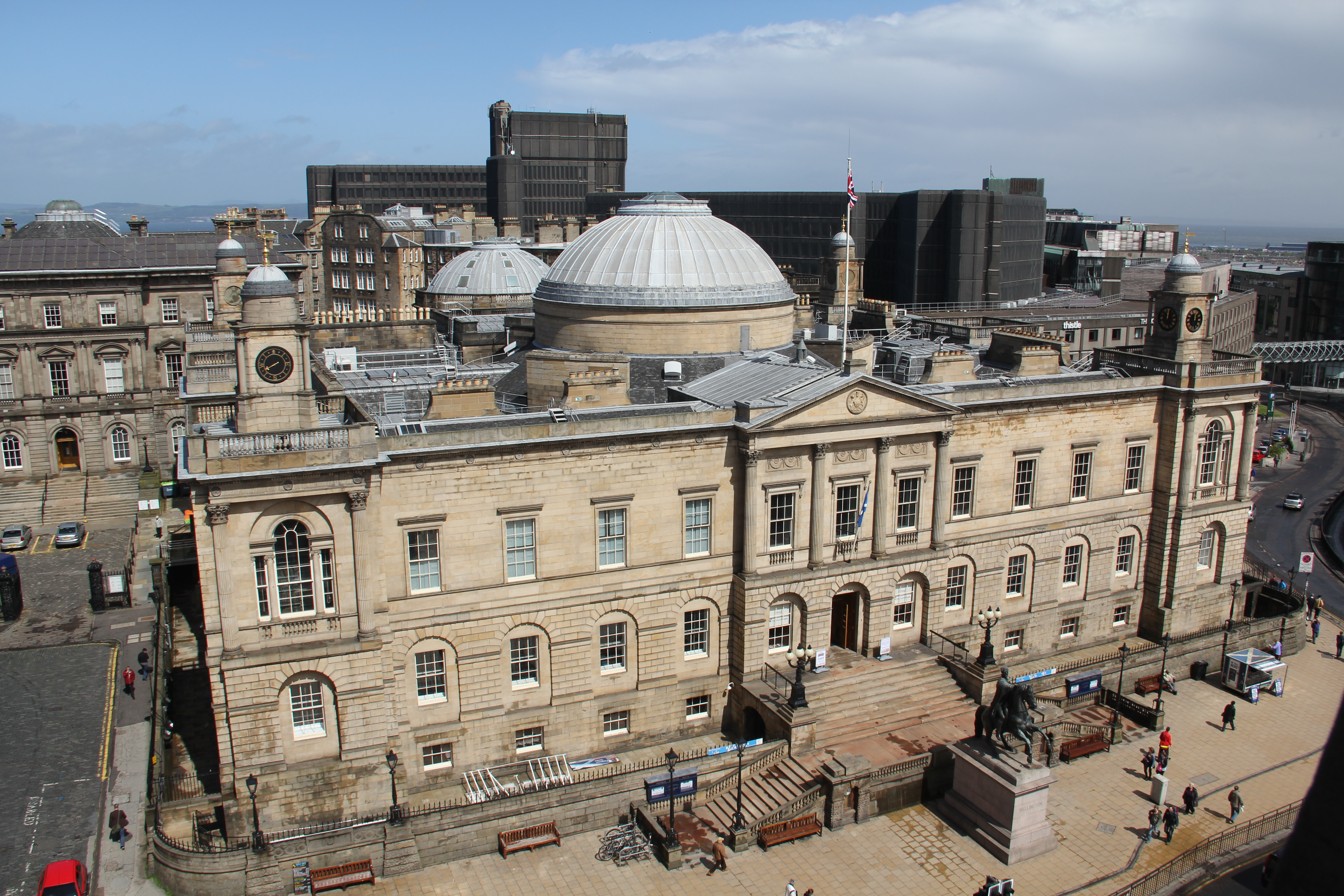
General Register House, Edinburgh

In 2011, the General Register Office for Scotland was merged to form the National Records of Scotland – a department of the devolved Scottish Government – with the position of registrar general for Scotland being held by the same individual as the keeper of the Records of Scotland.

=== Northern Ireland ===
The General Register Office in Belfast is responsible for local register offices in Northern Ireland.

== Ireland ==
As part of the United Kingdom, all of Ireland's register offices were previously organised under a General Register Office in Dublin.

In Ireland, legislation came into force in 1845 that provided for the registration of civil marriages and for the regulation of all non-Catholic marriages. Roman Catholic marriages were reported to the relevant superintendent registrar.

In the Republic of Ireland, a General Register Office exists as a central repository for records relating to births, stillbirths, adoptions, marriages, civil partnerships and deaths. Local registration takes place in HSE Civil Registration Services across the country.

== See also ==
- Onomastics
- Name change
- Pseudonym
