= Jil Matheson =

British statistician

Dame Jilian Norma Matheson DCB FAcSS (born 27 March 1953) is the former National Statistician of the United Kingdom.

== Career ==
Matheson joined the Office of Population Censuses and Surveys in 1975. She worked on the Expenditure and Food Survey and the General Household Survey. After 1998 she worked on Neighbourhood Statistics. At the ONS, between 2004 and 2008, she was the Director of Census, Demographic and Regional Statistics.

She became Director General for Statistics Delivery at the ONS in 2008 with responsibility for the delivery of all ONS statistical operations and outputs, and for the development of the ONS’ statistical portfolio in consultation with users.

She has been elected a Fellow of the Academy of Social Sciences (FAcSS) in 2001, a member of the Social Research Association, and a Fellow of the Royal Statistical Society (FRSS).

Matheson was awarded an Honorary Doctorate of Science by the University of Bath in December 2016.

=== National Statistician ===
Matheson succeeded Dame Karen Dunnell as National Statistician on 1 September 2009, and Chief Executive of the UK Statistics Authority (and the Office for National Statistics). She retired from these roles on 30 June 2014. She was appointed Dame Commander of the Order of the Bath (DCB) in the 2014 Birthday Honours for services to government statistics.

== See also ==
- Demographics of the United Kingdom

Government offices
Preceded by Karen Dunnell	National Statistician; 2009–2014	Succeeded by John Pullinger
