= Tim Holt (statistician) =

British statistician (1943–2022)

Tim Holt CB
- Born: 29 October 1943; Lewes, Sussex, England
- Died: 15 November 2022 (aged 79); Minstead, Hampshire, England
- Education: University of Exeter
- Scientific career
- Workplaces: Statistics Canada; University of Southampton
- Thesis: Some contributions to the statistical analysis of single and mixed exponential distributions (1970)

David Holt CB (29 October 1943 – 15 November 2022), better known as Tim Holt, was a British statistician who was Professor Emeritus of Social Statistics at the University of Southampton. He had been the president of the Royal Statistical Society (2005–2007), the last director of the Central Statistical Office of the United Kingdom, and the first director of the Office for National Statistics (and ex-officio Registrar General).

== Background ==
Holt was born in Lewes, Sussex on 29 October 1943 as David Holt, but acquired the nickname Tim after the actor. He was educated at Coopers' Company School and then took a maths degree and a PhD in statistics at Exeter with thesis titled Some contributions to the statistical analysis of single and mixed exponential distributions in 1970. Throughout his career, his main interests have been survey methods, sampling theory and official statistics. He took a particular interest, through his membership of the Royal Statistical Society, in the independence of national statistics from government.

== Career ==
Holt's first job was with Statistics Canada, the national statistics office of Canada, where he spent four years before joining the Department of Social Statistics at the University of Southampton in 1980. He was Leverhulme Professor of Social Statistics from 1980 to 1995 and Deputy Vice-Chancellor from 1990 to 1995. From 1989 to 1991, he was also vice-president of the International Association of Survey Statisticians (IASS).

Holt became the director of the Central Statistical Office and Head of the Government Statistical Service in 1995 and, subsequently, the first director of the Office for National Statistics when it was formed on 1 April 1996 from the merger of the Central Statistical Office (CSO) and the Office of Population Censuses and Surveys (OPCS). He was President of the Labour Statistics Congress (ILO) in 1997 and vice-chair of the United Nations Statistical Commission from 1998 to 1999.

Holt returned to the Department of Social Statistics at Southampton in 2000, working part-time as professor of social statistics. He carried out consultancy work for the United Nations, the International Monetary Fund and the World Bank and was elected president of the Royal Statistical Society in 2005.

== Personal life and death ==
Holt died from heart disease at his home in Minstead, Hampshire, on 15 November 2022, at the age of 79.

== Awards and honours ==
In 1990 he was elected as a Fellow of the American Statistical Association.

Holt was appointed a Companion of the Order of the Bath (CB) in the 2000 New Year Honours. He was also the 2003 recipient of the Waksberg Prize in survey methodology.

== Sources ==
- "Professor Tim Holt: Career", Museum of Learning. Retrieved 20 May 2010.
- Tim Holt, Julian Champkin (2007). "Tim Holt", Significance, vol 4 issue 2, pp 75–76.

Preceded by Bill McLennan	Director of the Central Statistical Office; 1995–1996	Succeeded by —
Preceded by —	Director of the Office for National Statistics; 1996–2000	Succeeded by Len Cook
