= Bayfield High School, Dunedin =

Bayfield High School

Location
- 2 Shore Street; Dunedin; New Zealand; 45.895653°S 170.523021°E

Information
- Type: Secondary
- Motto: Latin: Quaerere Verum (Seek the Truth)
- Established: 1961
- Ministry of Education Institution no.: 382
- Chairperson: Stephanie Woodley
- Principal: Mark Jones
- Enrolment: 521 (July 2026)
- Socio-economic decile: 7O
- Newspaper: The Bayleaf
- Website: www.bayfield-high.school.nz

Bayfield High School is a co-educational high school in Dunedin, New Zealand. It was established in 1961 and is located on the corner of Musselburgh Rise and Shore Street, adjacent to the Otago Harbour. The school currently has approximately 600 students.

== History ==
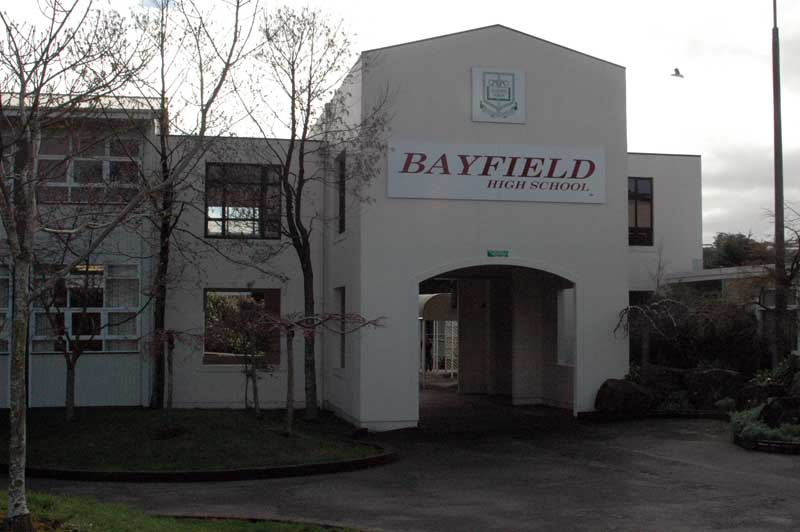
The former Archway at main entrance

Bayfield High School was founded in 1961. The school celebrated its 50th anniversary in June 2011.

On 14 November 2023, Bayfield attracted significant domestic media attention following an email threat. In response, the school was placed on lockdown for two hours while members of the New Zealand Police's Armed Offenders Squad searched the school grounds. Police subsequently spoke to a youth who was identified as a "person of interest" and the source of the threat which sparked the lockdown.

On 24 September 2024, the school was evacuated after receiving another email threat. Police subsequently arrested and charged a 16 year old youth with threatening to kill.

== Enrolment ==
As of July 2026, Bayfield High School has roll of 521 students, of which 100 (19.2%) identify as Māori.

As of 2026, Bayfield High School has an Equity Index of 463, placing it amongst schools whose students have average socioeconomic barriers to achievement (roughly equivalent to deciles 5 and 6 under the former socio-economic decile system).

== Facilities ==
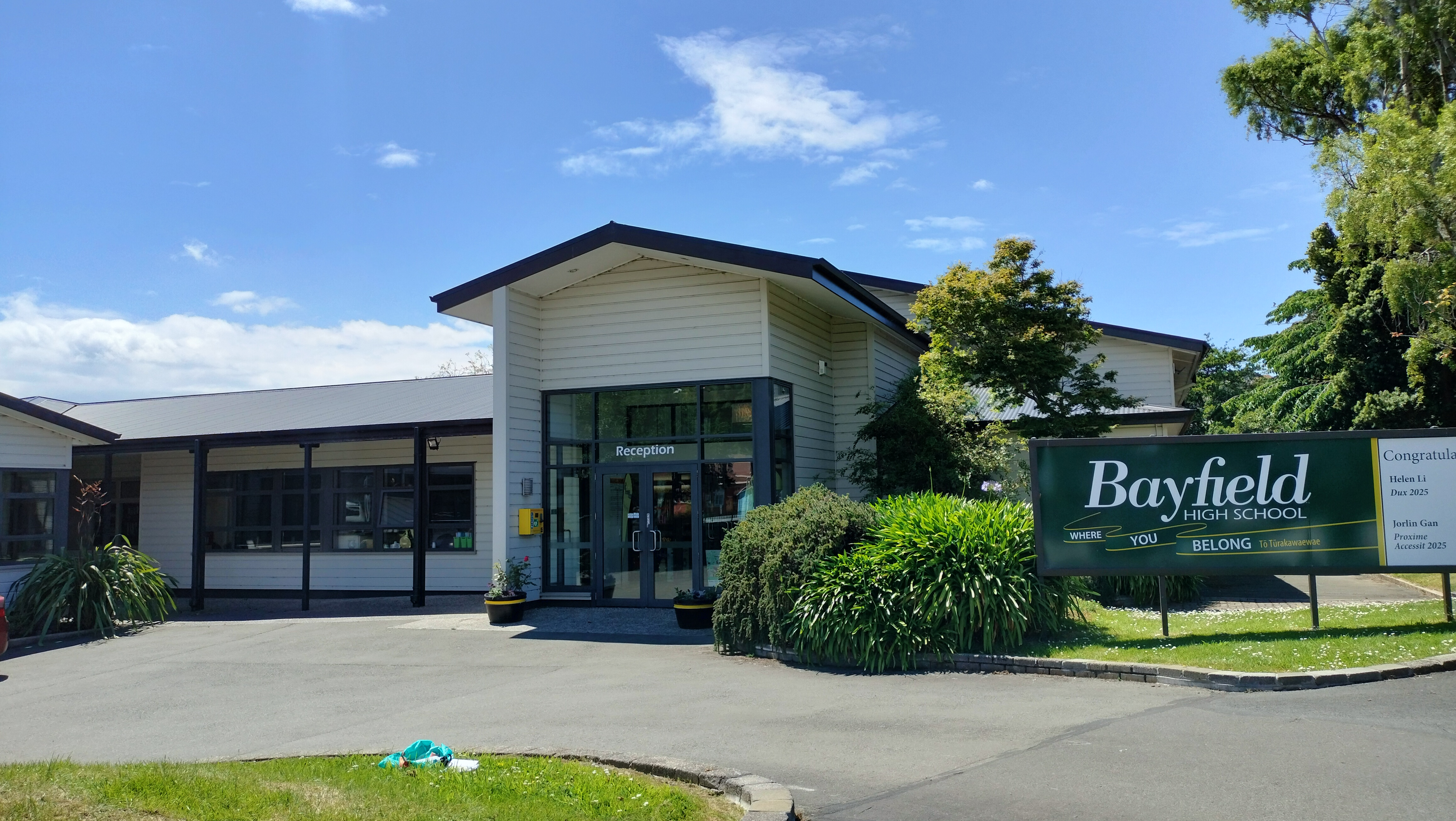
Bayfield's front office in December 2025

Like most New Zealand state secondary schools built in the 1960s, Bayfield High School was originally built to the Nelson Two-Storey plan. The Nelson Two-Storey is distinguished by its two-storey H-shaped classroom blocks, with stairwells at each end of the block and a large ground floor toilet and cloak area on one side. Bayfield has two of these blocks, known as B block and C block.

An archway entrance and administration block were built in the 1990s and demolished in 2015. Stage one of a new gymnasium was opened on 22 August 2008, after teachers approached the Ministry of Education in 2007 requesting an upgrade to undersized facilities.

== Curriculum and culture ==
The school is well known throughout the local community for having a strong music department. Students perform regularly in the wider community and in 2006 the school Orchestra, Jazz Band and Madrigal Choir flew to Sydney, Australia to play in the Sydney Opera House with a company called United World Concert Tours. The Colorado Springs Youth Symphony and the Honolulu Community Concert Band, from Hawaii, also performed. Another tour to Melbourne, Australia took place in June 2010 for 30 students and their supporters.

Bayfield High School has an ESOL department for overseas fee paying students. In 2010 there were 40 overseas students enrolled from Japan, China, Brazil, Germany, Slovakia, Switzerland, Taiwan, France and Korea. The overseas students have specialist English Language classes together with regular classes. They also take trips away from school including visits to Fiordland, the Queenstown's ski fields and Aoraki / Mount Cook.

There are five houses with approximately 160 students in each house. The houses are Anderson, Begg, Herron, Ross and Somerville. All houses except Herron are named after the founding fathers of the district; Herron is named after the first principal Jack Herron. Each house has four tutor groups with a tutor teacher and associate teacher. Each house has a dean that looks after the house.

== Notable alumni and staff ==
- David Bain – acquitted of murder after a retrial in 2009
- David Benson-Pope – former cabinet minister, was a teacher at the school.
- Daniel Borgman – director of The Weight of Elephants
- Len Cook – former National Statistician of the United Kingdom
- Anna Grimaldi – para-athlete, Paralympic gold medallist.
- Danyon Loader – Olympic Gold medallist
- Gary Seear – All Black rugby player (1976–79)
