= Forestry Authority =

UK government research agency

Agency overview
- Jurisdiction: England, Scotland
- Headquarters: Cambridge, England
- Parent agency: Forestry Commission
- Website: www.forestry.gov.uk

The Forestry Authority was a government research agency and a former branch of the non-ministerial government department the Forestry Commission of England and Scotland.

It was responsible for the administration and payment of grants for approved planting and restocking schemes throughout England and Scotland, for controlling functions such as felling, for forestry research and for providing advice to private woodland owners along with local authorities and countryside groups.

The research of the Forestry Authority covered a wide range of topics, such as: administration; communications; entomology; environmental research; forest products; mensuration; overseas contracts; pathology; physiology; plant production; silviculture; site studies; statistics and computing; tree improvement; and wildlife and conservation.

The Forestry Authority was based at Great Eastern House, Cambridge, England.

It merged into the Forestry Commission in the early 2000s.
