= UK Statistics Authority =

Non-ministerial government department of the United Kingdom

- Scottish Gaelic: Am Bòrd an Staitistig; Welsh: Y Bwrdd Ystadegau

Agency overview
- Formed: 1 April 2008; 18 years ago
- Jurisdiction: United Kingdom
- Headquarters: Marsham Street, London
- Employees: 5,363
- Annual budget: £256m (2018)
- Minister responsible: Nick Thomas-Symonds, Minister for the Cabinet Office
- Agency executives: Penny Young, interim chair; André Loranger, National Statistician
- Parent department: Cabinet Office
- Child agencies: Office for National Statistics; Government Statistical Service; Office of Statistics Regulation
- Website: statisticsauthority.gov.uk

The UK Statistics Authority (UKSA, Welsh: Awdurdod Ystadegau'r DU) is a non-ministerial government department of the Government of the United Kingdom responsible for oversight of the Office for National Statistics, maintaining a national code of practice for official statistics, and accrediting statistics that comply with the Code as National Statistics. UKSA was established on 1 April 2008 by the Statistics and Registration Service Act 2007, and is directly accountable to the Parliament of the United Kingdom.

== Background ==
Gordon Brown, then Chancellor of the Exchequer, announced on 28 November 2005, that the government intended to publish plans in early 2006 to legislate to render the Office for National Statistics (ONS) and the statistics it generates independent of government on a model based on the independence of the Monetary Policy Committee of the Bank of England. This was originally a 1997 Labour Party manifesto commitment and was also the policy of the Liberal Democrat and Conservative parties. Such independence was also sought by the Royal Statistical Society and the Statistics Commission. The National Statistician, who is the chief executive of the ONS, would be directly accountable to Parliament through a widely constituted independent governing Statistics Board. The ONS would be a non-ministerial government department so that the staff, including the eirector, would remain as civil servants but without being under direct ministerial control. The National Statistician at the time, Karen Dunnell, stated that the legislation would help improve public trust in official statistics although the ONS already acts independently according to its own published guidelines, the National Statistics Code of Practice, which sets out the key principles and standards that official statisticians, including those in other parts of the Government Statistical Service, are expected to follow and uphold.

The details of the plans for independence were considered in Parliament during the 2006/2007 session and resulted in the Statistics and Registration Service Act 2007. In July 2007, Sir Michael Scholar was nominated by the government to be the three-day-a-week non-executive chairman of the Statistics Board which, to re-establish faith in the integrity of government statistics, has statutory responsibility for oversight of UK government statistics and of the Office for National Statistics. It also has a duty to assess all UK government statistics. Following Gordon Brown's later announcement on his 2007 appointment as Prime Minister of new constitutional arrangements for public appointments, Sir Michael also became, on 18 July, the first such nominee to appear before the House of Commons Treasury Committee and to have his nomination subject to confirmation by the House. On 7 February 2008, following the first meeting of the shadow board, it was announced that the body would be known as the UK Statistics Authority.

UKSA was established on 1 April 2008 by the Statistics and Registration Service Act 2007, and is directly accountable to the Parliament of the United Kingdom. It reports to Parliament through the Minister for the Cabinet Office.

== Functions ==
Formally, the UK Statistics Authority has two main functions: a production arm – the Office for National Statistics – and a regulatory arm – the Office for Statistics Regulation (OSR). The board has established two main committees, as well as a remuneration committee. The regulation committee oversees the work of the OSR, and has a delegated function to approve the formal assessments of official statistics; and the audit and risk committee monitors strategic risks and has independent external members.

=== Office for National Statistics ===
The ONS is responsible for collecting, analysing and distributing statistical information about the UK's economy, society and population. It replaces the role previously performed by HM Treasury ministers.

=== Office for Statistics Regulation ===
The Office for Statistics Regulation (OSR) performs independent monitoring of official statistics, including assessment of the coverage, completeness and usefulness of statistics in particular areas. The OSR is also responsible for maintaining a Code of Practice for Official Statistics, and accrediting Code-compliant statistics as 'National Statistics'. However, the chair can also act to comment on perceived misuse of official statistics by persons responsible or accountable for them. The assessment function has an operational role of producing reports on code compliance of specific sets of national statistics, and also a role making more strategic recommendations for the improvement of statistical outputs, in terms of both the presentation and coverage of official statistics as well as monitoring public trust in government statistics.

The UKSA has reported on the need to improve commentary supporting the release of official statistics, and the procedures and extent of pre-release access to official statistics by government ministers. The authority has also produced reports on the impact of cuts to specific statistical activity, such as the citizenship survey, especially where these changes affect users in other bodies. Other reports focus on statistics relating to a particular sector such as health and charities both of which have relevant data collected by more than one government body. A specific stream of work has been on user engagement, identifying the uses of official statistics and the extent to which the needs of users are taken into account by producers.

== Independent reviews ==
In 2025, a review of the organisational culture, structure and leadership at ONS was commissioned from Sir Robert Devereux. He found issues with prioritisation and programme management and a reluctance "at senior levels, to hear and act on difficult news". His three recommendations were:

- a focus on improvement of core statistics delivery and assurance
- to split the role of national statistician and permanent secretary for ONS
- revision of the governing legislation to reflect changes to governance of UK statistics

In 2023 a review of governance led by Prof Denise Lievesley was announced as part of the cycle of independent reviews of independent public bodies. Her report was published in 2024, having followed a full review process, including an independent challenge panel comprising Professor Sir John Curtice, Dr Tim Leunig, Professor Guy Nason, Professor Alice Sullivan and Dr Ben Warner among others. When the review was published in March 2024, it recommended the needs of users across society be understood at a triennial statistical assembly. The first such statistical assembly was held in London in January 2025, and chaired by Professor Cathie Sudlow.

Since it was formed in 2008, the UKSA has also been the subject of a number of reviews in respect of technical matters: in 2015 economic statistics (led by Professor Sir Charles Bean) and in 2016 methodology (led by Dr Andrew Garrett).

== Current board members ==
Member	Current rôle	Started
Vacant	Chair	8 July 2025
Penny Young	deputy chair	13 February 2023
Dr. Jacob Abboud	non-executive member	13 February 2023
Peter Barron	non-executive member	31 January 2025
Prof. Dame Carol Propper	non-executive member	13 February 2023
Prof Mairi Spowage	non-executive member	31 January 2025
Dr Sarah Walsh	non-executive member	31 January 2025

=== Ex officio executive members ===
As well as the nine non-executive members of the Board, up to three civil servants serve as executive members as a part of their jobs, currently:

- Darren Tierney, permanent secretary for ONS and accounting officer for UK Statistics Authority
- Ed Humpherson, the authority's head of assessment, responsible for the independent assessment of official statistics

== Former board members ==
Member	Role	Started	End
Prof. Sir David Spiegelhalter	non-executive director	27 May 2020	26 May 2026
Sir Robert Chote	Chair	1 June 2022	30 September 2025
Prof. Sir John Aston	non-executive director	1 July 2021	31 December 2024
Sian Jones	deputy chair	1 July 2016	30 June 2024
Nora Nanayakkara	non-executive member	1 July 2016	30 June 2024
Richard Dobbs	non-executive director	27 May 2020	26 May 2023
Prof. Jonathan Haskel	non-executive director	1 February 2016	1 February 2023
Helen Boaden	non-executive director	1 June 2019	31 December 2022
Prof. Anne Trefethen	non-executive director	1 June 2018	31 December 2022
Sir David Norgrove	chair	April 2017	31 March 2022
Prof. David Hand	non-executive director	1 April 2013	30 June 2021
Prof. Sir Adrian Smith	non-executive director	1 September 2012	31 March 2020
Prof. Sir Adrian Smith	non-executive director	1 April 2008	1 September 2008
Prof. Sir Ian Diamond	non-executive director	1 June 2018	5 August 2019
Dr David Levy	non-executive director	1 August 2012	30 May 2019
Dame Colette Bowe	non-executive director	1 April 2008	31 March 2018
Dame Moira Gibb	non-executive director	1 February 2008	31 January 2018
Sir Andrew Dilnot	chair	1 April 2012	31 March 2017
Dame Carolyn Fairbairn	non-executive director	1 April 2013	30 September 2015
Professor David Rhind	deputy chair (Statistics System)	1 July 2012	30 June 2015
Mr Partha Dasgupta	non-executive director	1 April 2008	30 June 2014
Sir Jon Shortridge	non-executive director	1 February 2010	30 October 2012
Lord (David) Rowe-Beddoe	deputy chair (ONS)	1 April 2008	31 August 2012
Sir Michael Scholar	Chair	1 April 2008	31 March 2012
Professor Sir Roger Jowell	deputy chair (Statistics System)	11 November 2008	25 December 2011
Professor Stephen Nickell	non-executive director	1 April 2008	31 October 2010
Sir Alan Langlands	non-executive director	1 April 2008	12 April 2009

== See also ==
- Office for National Statistics
- National Records of Scotland
- Northern Ireland Statistics and Research Agency
