= Statistics Commission =

The commission's logo

The Statistics Commission was a non-departmental public body established in June 2000 by the UK Government to oversee the work of the Office for National Statistics. Its chairman was Professor David Rhind who succeeded the first chairman, Sir John Kingman, in May 2003. Although it was non-departmental, the commission was funded by grant-in-aid from the Treasury. Following the implementation of the Statistics & Registration Services Act 2007, the commission was abolished. Its functions were to be taken over and considerably enhanced by the UK Statistics Authority (UKSA), whose powers began on 1 April 2008 under the chairmanship of Sir Michael Scholar. Professor Rhind is among the non-executive members of the new authority, to which the ONS is accountable. This contrasts with the duties of the previous Commission which were limited to reporting, observing and criticizing ONS while it, until 2008, has been publicly accountable via a Treasury minister.

== History ==
The Commission arose from an election manifesto commitment by the Labour Government whilst in Opposition to provide independent national statistics. The commitment was implemented by the Government first publishing a Green Paper in 1998 inviting consultation which offered four options for overseeing the production of statistics for ministers. The subsequent white paper revealed that, of those four options, the one which received significantly more support than the others was the establishment of a Commission Consequently, in drawing up the new framework for national statistics, the Statistics Commission was established. Its main function is to

"...give independent, reliable and relevant advice on National Statistics to Ministers and, by so doing, to provide an additional safeguard on the quality and integrity of National Statistics."

The white paper charged the commission with four principal aims:

- To consider and comment to government on National Statistics's programme and scope of work
- To comment on National Statistics's quality assurance processes and to arrange audits where it finds concern
- To comment on the application of the code of practice for official statistics
- To prepare for the UK Parliament an annual report on National Statistics and the Commission

== Commissioners ==
The last commissioners were:

- Professor David Rhind, formerly Vice-Chancellor and President of City University, London
- Ian Beesley, a retired senior partner at PricewaterhouseCoopers and Fellow of the Royal Statistical Society
- Sir Kenneth Calman, Vice-Chancellor and Warden of the University of Durham
- Janet Trewsdale, chairman of the Northern Ireland Economic Council
- Sir Derek Wanless, formerly a director of Northern Rock plc
- Colette Bowe, chairman of the Ofcom Consumer Panel
- Patricia Hodgson, governor of the Wellcome Foundation and non-executive director of the Competition Commission
- Martin Weale, director of the National Institute of Economic and Social Research
- Joly Dixon, a retired director at the European Commission and Fellow of the Royal Statistical Society

The chief executive was Richard Alldritt

== See also ==
- Office for National Statistics
- UK Statistics Authority (UKSA)
- HM Treasury
