= Aubrey McKennell =

British social psychologist (1927-2013)

Aubrey Cecil McKennell
- Born: 1927; Leeds
- Died: 2013 (aged 85–86)
- Citizenship: British
- Occupation: Psychologist

Academic background
- Education: University of Manchester; University of Leeds
- Thesis: Psychological problems in the assessment of the quality in wool (1956)

Academic work
- Discipline: Social Psychology
- Sub-discipline: Attitudes
- Institutions: University of Southampton

Aubrey McKennell (1927-2013) was a British social psychologist with particular expertise in attitude theory and in the applications of psychology to understanding various phenomena.

== Career ==
McKennell was born in Leeds in 1927. After school he joined the Royal Air Force in 1943 where he remained for five years. On discharge he enrolled in the University of Manchester from which he graduated with a first-class degree in psychology followed by an MA in 1953. He then transferred to the University of Leeds where he obtained his PhD in 1956 for a thesis on the subject of perceptions of wool quality.

He worked for a brief period as lecturer in psychology in Glasgow followed by a post as chief psychologist for Attwood Statistics. In 1960, he moved to a post in the UK Government Social Survey. In 1967 he was appointed to the University of Southampton where he was promoted to professor of psychology in 1980. He obtained a Fulbright fellowship to spend time at the University of Michigan Institute for Social Research (1972–74). He retired in 1992.

== Research ==
While working for the Government Social Survey in the 1960s he produced two major and influential reports. The first was a study on the impact of aircraft noise pollution on people living near Heathrow airport, taking into account how close they were to the flight paths and the numbers of aircraft (McKennell, 1961). This was a difficult research project and McKennell discussed some of the methodological challenges. It continues to inform debate on aircraft noise.

The second project was a major study on adolescents’ attitudes to cigarette smoking (McKennell & Thomas, 1967). He identified what he described a five primary smoking motivation factors which he labelled ‘nervous irritation', 'relaxation’, ‘smoking alone ’, ‘activity accompaniment’ and ‘food substitution’. He found that these factors were related to amount of smoking, indices of addiction, attitude to the helpfulness of smoking, and the ability to give up smoking (McKennell, 1970). This was the first major study of social and psychological factors involved in smoking by young people. It was frequently referred to by subsequent researchers.

In the 1980s, he surveyed visual impairment for the Royal National Institute of Blind People. The survey of blind and partially sighted people helped to map out the facts about living with visual impairment, how it was subjectively experienced and its economic and social impact on the quality of life (Bruce, McKennell, & Walker,1991; Walker, Tobin, & McKennell, 1992).

He was also involved in a research programme with a US colleague, Frank Andrews, on psychological wellbeing. Their findings indicated that feelings about a person's own life were strongly influenced by beliefs about the quality of other people's lives.[4]

== Key publications ==
=== Reports ===
- Bruce, I., McKennell, A.C., & Walker, E. (1991). Blind and partially sighted adults in Britain: the RNIB survey. London: HMSO.
- Walker, E., Tobin, M., & McKennell, A.C. (1992). Blind and partially sighted children in Britain: the RNIB survey. London: HMSO,
- McKennell, A.C., & Thomas, R.K. (1967). Adults' and Adolescents' Smoking Habits and Attitudes. London: HMSO.
- McKennell, A.C. (1961). Aircraft Noise Annoyance around London, Heathrow, Airport. A survey made in 1961 for the Wilson Committee on the Problem of Noise. London: HMSO.

=== Journal articles ===
- Andrews, F. M. and McKennell, A. C. (2005). Measures of Self-Reported Well-Being: Their Affective, Cognitive, and other Components. Social Indicators Research Series, 191-219.
- McKennell, A.C., & Andrews, F.M.(1983). Components of perceived life quality. Journal of Community Psychology, 11(2), 98-110.
- McKennell, A.C., Andrews, F.M. (1980). Models of cognition and affect in perceptions of well-being. Social Indicators Research, 8, 257–298.
- McKennell, A.C. (1974). Surveying Attitude Structure: A Discussion of Principles and Procedures. London: Elsevier.
- McKennell, A. (1970). Attitude Measurement: Use of Coefficient Alpha with Cluster or Factor Analysis. Sociology, 4(2), 227-245.
- McKennell, A. C. (1973). A comparison of two smoking typologies. Research Paper No. 12, London: Tobacco Research Council.
- McKennell, A. C. (1970). Smoking motivation factors. British Journal of Social & Clinical Psychology, 9, 8-22.
- McKennell, A. C. (1969). Implications for health education of social influences on smoking. American Journal of Public Health, 59 (11), 1998
- McKennell, A. C., & Bynner, J. M. (1969). Self-images and smoking behaviour among school boys. British Journal of Educational Psychology, 39, 27-29.
