= Darren Tierney =

British civil servant

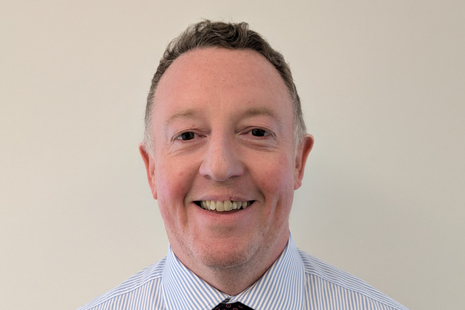
Darren Tierney

Darren Christopher Tierney (born 29 January 1975) is a British civil servant, serving since 2025 as the Permanent Secretary for the Office for National Statistics.

Tierney, a Roman Catholic from Northern Ireland who attended St Columb's College in Derry and then Queen's University Belfast, joined the civil service in 2007, joining the Ministry of Justice where he held various roles including as Principal Private Secretary to the Lord Chancellor, Kenneth Clarke.

Tierney was then promoted to director, serving first as director for youth justice policy. He then briefly worked for the Cabinet Office as director for civil service efficiency in 2015, returning to the Ministry of Justice as interim director-general of prison policy in 2016 for a few months. From 2016 until 2019, Tierney worked as the new Department for International Trade's director of strategy. He was promoted to serve from 2019 as the director-general responsible for global trade and investment.

Tierney returned to the Cabinet Office in 2021, taking over from outgoing Deputy Cabinet Secretary Helen MacNamara in the part of her role as overseeing propriety and ethics across the UK government. Tierney worked on the investigation into the Westminster Christmas parties controversy with his predecessor but one in this role, Sue Gray. In 2023, the role was reformed to include the constitutional affairs parts of the cabinet office, and renamed to "Director General, Propriety and Constitution Group".

== Offices held ==
Government offices
Preceded by Unknown	Director General, Global Trade and Investment, Department for International Trade; 2019–2021	Succeeded by Ceri Smith
Preceded by Helen MacNamara	Director General, Propriety and Ethics; 22 March 2021–2023	Succeeded by self as Director General, Propriety and Constitution
Preceded by self as Director General, Propriety and Ethics	Director General, Propriety and Constitution; 2023–2025	Succeeded by Ellen Atkinson
Preceded by Sir Ian Diamond as National Statistician and Permanent Secretary	Permanent Secretary for the Office for National Statistics; 2025–present	Incumbent
