= David William Rhind =

British geographer (1943–2025)

David William Rhind CBE FRS FBA (1943 – 6 January 2025) was a British geographer and expert on geographic information systems (GIS). He was Vice-Chancellor of City University, London, until July 2007.

== Life and career ==
Rhind graduated in geography and geology from the University of Bristol in 1965 and received a PhD in geomorphology from the University of Edinburgh in 1969.

Rhind held academic posts at Edinburgh, the Royal College of Art and Durham, before becoming a professor of geography at the University of London in 1982. In this position he was a major contributor to the Chorley Committee, the UK Government committee of enquiry "Handling of Geographical Information", which reported in 1987. He subsequently became Director General of Ordnance Survey, overseeing the completion of the digitisation of the last of its paper maps.

Work on GIS led to the awarding of a DSc from the University of London in 1991. Rhind has also received honorary doctorates from universities including Bristol, Loughborough, Southampton, Kingston, Durham, London Metropolitan, Royal Holloway, Edinburgh and City University London. In 2002 Rhind was elected a Fellow of the Royal Society and an Honorary Fellow of the British Academy. He was the first geographer elected to the Royal Society for nearly 50 years and is almost unique in also being a Fellow of the British Academy.

Rhind has held many other posts including chairing the Statistics Commission and the UK Nuclear Decommissioning Authority's Socio-economic Committee, and membership of the court of directors for the Bank of England. In the 2001 New Year Honours, he received a CBE for services to Geographical and Social Sciences.

Rhind published several books on geography and the earth sciences. He died on 6 January 2025, aged 81.

== Academic and other posts ==
- Research Officer, University of Edinburgh 1968–69
- Head, Applications Section, Experimental Cartography Unit, Royal College of Art 1969–73
- Lecturer, then Reader, University of Durham 1973–1981
- Visiting Fellow, International Training Centre, Enschede, the Netherlands, 1975
- Visiting Fellow, Australian National University 1979
- Professor of Geography in the University of London 1982–91
- Dean of departments of Computer Science, Maths & Statistics, Economics and Geography, Birkbeck College 1987–91
- Director General and Chief Executive, Ordnance Survey of Great Britain 1992–98
- Vice-Chancellor and President, City University London 1998–2007
- Chairman, the Statistics Commission 2003–08
- Chairman, Universities UK, Employment Business and Industry Policy Committee
- Non-executive director, Bank of England
- Non-executive director, deputy chair (statistical system) UK Statistics Authority

== Bibliography ==
- Data banking of drift borehole records for the Edinburgh area, Rhind D. & Sissons, J.B., HMSO, 1971.
- Geology of Durham County; The buried valley of the lower Tweed, Newcastle upon Tyne : Natural History Society of Northumberland, Durham and Newcastle upon Tyne, 1972.
- Computer mapping of drift lithology from borehole records, Rhind D.W., HMSO, 1973, ISBN 0-11-880609-2
- People in Durham : a census atlas, Dewdney J.C. & Rhind D. (Eds), University of Durham, 1975, ISBN 0-900974-38-9.
- Contemporary cartography, Rhind D., London : Institute of British Geographers, 1977.
- Geographical networks and automatic data processing, Cox N.J. & Rhind D., University of Durham, Dept. of Geography, 1978.
- Making a national atlas of population by computer, Rhind D.W. & Evans I.S., Census Research Unit, Department of Geography, Univ. of Durham, 1978.
- Land Use, Rhind D. & Hudson R., Methuen, 1980 ISBN 0-416-71780-2.
- A Census user's handbook, Rhind D.W., Methuen, 1983, ISBN 0-416-30510-5
- Cartographic and remote-sensing digital databases in the United Kingdom, Finch S. & Rhind D., British Library Research and Development Dept., 1987, ISBN 0-7123-3106-9
- Handling Geographic Information: Report of the Committee of Enquiry chaired by Lord Chorley, Department of the Environment, HMSO, 1987, ISBN 0-11-752015-2
- Cartography, Past, Present, and Future: A Festschrift for F.J. Ormeling, Rhind D.W. & Taylor D.R.F., Elsevier Applied Science for International Cartographic Assoc, 1989, ISBN 1-85166-336-3
- Environmental monitoring and prediction, Rhind D., London : South-east Regional Research Laboratory, University of London, c 1990.
- Geographical Information Systems: Principles and Applications (known in GIS circles as the Big Book), Maguire, D. J. Goodchild, M. F. & Rhind, D. W., The Geoinformation Group, Harlow, 1991 ISBN 0-582-05661-6
- Understanding GIS: The ARC/INFO method, Rhind D.W., ESRI, 1992 (6th Ed), ISBN 1-879102-07-2
- Postcodes : the new geography, Raper J., Rhind D. & Shepherd J., Longman, 1992, ISBN 0-582-09270-1
- Statistics, maps, information and money, Manchester Statistical Society, 1994, ISBN 0-85336-127-4
- Framework for the World, Rhind D.W. (Ed), Cambridge, GeoInformation International, 1997, ISBN 0-470-24440-2
- Geographical Information Systems: Principles, Techniques, Applications and Management (aka the Big Book 2), Longley P.A., Goodchild, M. F., Maguire, D. J. & Rhind, D. W. (eds), Wiley, 1999 ISBN 0-471-32182-6
- Geographic Information Systems and Science, Longley P.A, Goodchild M.F, Maguire D.J. & Rhind D.W., John Wiley & Sons, 2001, ISBN 0-471-89275-0

Academic offices
Preceded by Raoul Franklin	Vice-Chancellor, City University, London; 1998–2007	Succeeded by Malcolm Gillies
