= Helen MacNamara =

British civil servant

Helen MacNamara CB
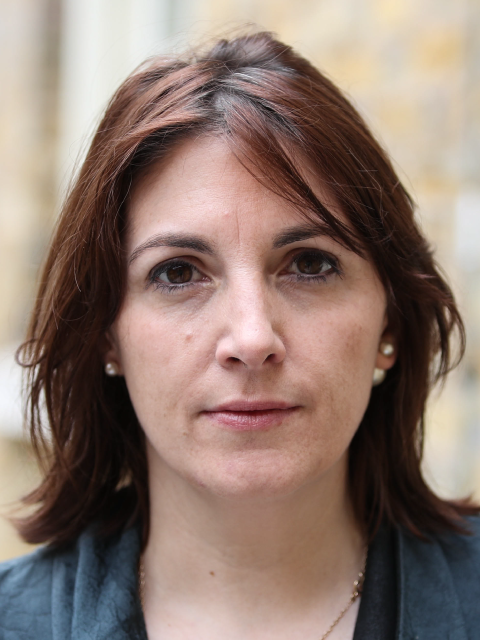
- Education: Clare College, Cambridge
- Occupation: Civil servant

Helen MacNamara CB is a British former civil servant, who served as the Deputy Cabinet Secretary in the Cabinet Office from 2020 to 2021. She had previously worked as Deputy Secretary to the Cabinet from January 2019 and was Director General for Propriety and Ethics in 2018. Previous to this, she was the Director General for Housing and Planning in the Ministry of Housing, Communities and Local Government. She worked for Jeremy Heywood in the Cabinet Secretariat from 2013 to 2016.

As a Director in the Department of Culture, Media and Sport she worked on the London 2012 Olympic bid and staging of the 2012 Summer Olympics. Earlier in her career, she worked as principal Private Secretary to Tessa Jowell and was responsible for setting up the Leveson Inquiry into British media ethics and the subsequent cross-party response.

== Early life and education ==
MacNamara read history at Clare College, Cambridge. Before joining the Civil Service, she was a new media entrepreneur.

== Civil Service career ==
In 2002, she joined the Department for Culture, Media and Sport, working as principal private secretary to Tessa Jowell and on London's bid and preparations for the 2012 Olympic Games. In 2010, she was appointed director for media policy, and was responsible for setting up the Leveson Inquiry.

From 2014 to 2016, MacNamara was Director of the Economic and Domestic Affairs Secretariat at the Cabinet Office, where she coordinated government preparations for the 2015 United Kingdom general election. In 2014, speaking at an event on "how women leaders succeed" at the Institute for Government, she said that EDS "run Cabinet and Cabinet Committees and we do lots of brokering to try to smooth the process for collective agreement." She spoke with enthusiasm about "the disruptive power of change" and how "crisis creates the opportunity to be disruptive". In late 2015, she was involved in a tribunal case in which she argued that the frequency of cabinet committee meetings should not be made public. The Information and Rights Tribunal described her as "evasive and disingenuous", and her evidence as "fundamentally flawed and of no value whatever".

From July 2016 to April 2018, MacNamara was Director General of Housing in the Ministry of Housing, Communities and Local Government. She was responsible for government policy on housing including £25 billion of investment, the Homes and Communities Agency, the Planning Inspectorate and the planning system.

In May 2018, she succeeded Sue Gray as Director General of the Propriety and Ethics Team in the Cabinet Office. Speaking about the appointment, Sir Jeremy Heywood, the then Cabinet Secretary said: "She is a highly experienced civil servant who has worked in many senior roles across government. Her appointment will bring a wealth of knowledge and understanding of how government works, that will assist her in this crucial role." A government minister is reported to have described her as "a perfect official, fair-minded, doesn't play games, will always try to get at the truth, capable of bringing sense out of five-sided talks".

=== Director General of Propriety and Ethics ===
In September 2019 some MPs called for MacNamara to investigate Dominic Cummings, an aide of Prime Minister Boris Johnson, after Cummings dismissed a Treasury aide, Sonia Khan. In February 2020 former special advisers called on MacNamara to defend the workplace rights of ministerial aides, amid further complaints about Cummings' behaviour. In February 2020, after claims that Home Secretary Priti Patel had bullied aides, The Times claimed that MacNamara "blocked" Patel's request for a formal leak inquiry into the claims, though the Cabinet Office denied that a formal request had been made. MacNamara's report into the bullying allegations against Patel were delayed by the Prime Minister's hospitalisation in April. The Labour Party called for the report to be made public, and repeated the calls in mid-July amid rumours that MacNamara was resisting pressure from Downing Street to exonerate Patel.

=== Deputy Cabinet Secretary ===
In spring 2020, MacNamara was promoted to become the Deputy Cabinet Secretary, a permanent secretary-level role in which she led the Cabinet Secretariat group in the Cabinet Office and advised the Prime Minister on the operation of the cabinet government and collective agreement, machinery of government, propriety and ethics and the Special Adviser and Ministerial Codes. She also managed the government's relationship with independent offices established in statute, including the Civil Service Commission.

MacNamara was working in Downing Street during the very early part of the COVID-19 pandemic. MacNamara claimed during this time she tried repeatedly to raise the lack of personal protective equipment (PPE) designed for women’s bodies. It emerged in Sue Gray's report that MacNamara had provided a karaoke machine during one of the illegal gatherings in Number 10 on 18 June 2020, during the COVID-19 lockdown. In April 2022 she was issued with a fixed penalty notice for her role in the gathering and she issued an apology for her “error of judgment”.

In July 2020, it was erroneously reported that MacNamara would leave her job the next month, to become permanent secretary of an unspecified government department. In January 2021 it was announced that she would leave her job the next month in preparation for a move to the private sector later in the year, working for the Premier League.

In the 2021 Birthday Honours, MacNamara was appointed Companion of the Order of the Bath (CB) for public service.

In November 2023, MacNamara gave evidence to the UK Covid-19 Inquiry.

== Personal life ==
MacNamara is married to Alex Towers, a former civil servant, who was previously Director of the now-defunct BBC Trust. They have four children.

In 2011 MacNamara featured in Management Today's list of 35 women leaders under 35 and in the 50 women to watch working in the cultural sector. She has been a trustee of the Target Ovarian Cancer charity (from 2008–2013) and a Governor of Goldsmiths College.

== In popular culture ==
In the 2023 Channel 4 docudrama Partygate, MacNamara was played by Charlotte Ritchie.

== Offices held ==
Government offices
Preceded by Sue Gray	Director General, Propriety and Ethics; 2018–2018	Succeeded by Darren Tierney
New title	Deputy Cabinet Secretary, Cabinet Office; 2019–2021	Role not directly continued
