= Len Cook =

New Zealand statistician

Leonard Warren Cook CBE CRSNZ (born 13 April 1949) is a professional statistician who was Government Statistician of New Zealand from 1992 to 2000, and National Statistician and Director of the United Kingdom Office for National Statistics, and Registrar General for England and Wales from 2000 to 2005. He served as Families Commissioner in New Zealand from 2015 to 2018.

== Background ==
Cook was born in Dunedin, New Zealand, in 1949 and was educated at Bayfield High School, Dunedin and the University of Otago where he did a BA (Hons) in Maths and Stats. He attended Henley Management Centre in 1989 and INSEAD in 1998.

Cook was elected a Chartered Statistician of the Royal Statistical Society in 1973 and a Companion of the Royal Society of New Zealand in 2005. He served as one of three vice-presidents of the International Statistical Institute from 2005 to 2007 and is a visiting fellow of Nuffield College, Oxford. He was made a CBE in June 2005.

Cook had a particular interest in social policy, demography, statistical methodology and the application of information technology in statistical systems. He was interested in the promotion of research methodology in public policy analysis and decision-making with past interests particularly in retirement provision and taxation policies.

He and his partner, Shirley Flora Vollweiler, have no children. His hobbies are languages, travel, hiking and fly fishing.

== Department of Statistics, New Zealand ==
After joining the Department of Statistics, New Zealand, (now Statistics New Zealand) in 1971, he was appointed as Assistant Government Statistician in 1982, Deputy Government Statistician in 1986 and Government Statistician in 1992. He was a member of the secretariat of the Prime Minister's Task Force on Tax Reform in 1981/82 and a member of the Royal Commission on Social Policy in New Zealand in 1987/88.

== Office for National Statistics, United Kingdom ==
Cook took up the post of National Statistician and Director of the Office for National Statistics at the end of May 2000. He was the second head of the ONS but the first to have the title of National Statistician. He returned to New Zealand and was succeeded by Karen Dunnell in September 2005.

He led the creation and publication of the National Statistics Code of Practice. Probably his most publicised act in his time in the United Kingdom came in February 2005, when as Registrar General he had to rule on the legality of the wedding of Charles, Prince of Wales and Camilla Parker Bowles.

Government offices
Preceded by Steve Kuzmicich	Government Statistician, New Zealand; 1992 – 2000	Succeeded by Brian Pink
Preceded by Tim Holt	Director of the Office for National Statistics & National Statistician, UK; 2000 – 2005	Succeeded by Karen Dunnell
