= Joly Dixon =

Henry Joly Dixon CMG
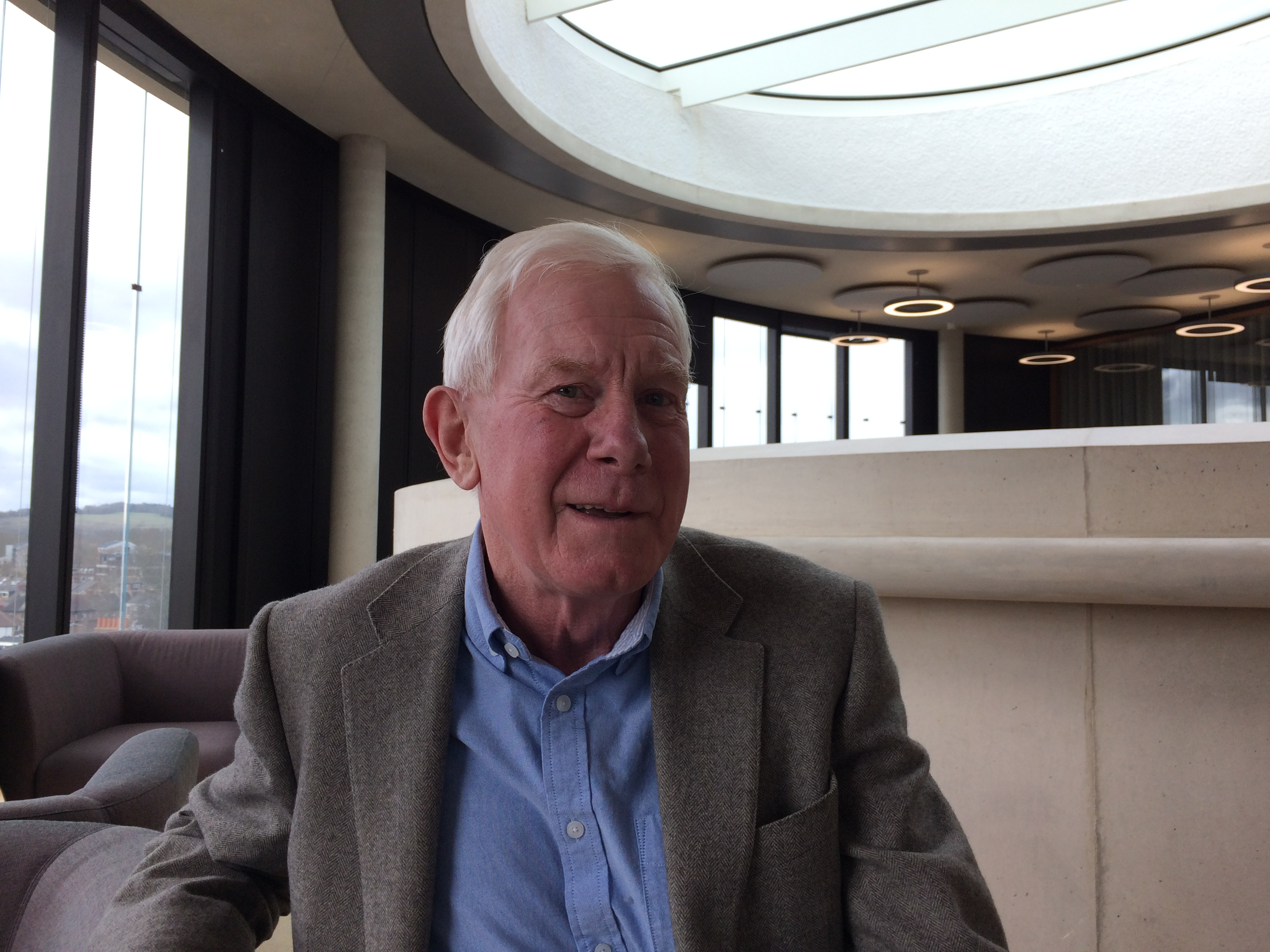

Personal details
- Born: 13 January 1945 (age 81) Warrington
- Education: University of York

Henry Joly Dixon CMG is a retired member of the European Civil Service, who served from 1993 to 2003 as Director of International Affairs in the Directorate-General for Economic and Financial Affairs of the European Commission. Before that he served in the cabinet of President Jacques Delors, where he was described as "his right-hand man on EMU".

In 1999 he was appointed as Deputy Special Representatives for the United Nations Interim Administration Mission in Kosovo (UNMIK), in charge of reconstruction.

After leaving the European Commission in 2003 he has held a range of posts, most notably as a Commissioner of the Statistics Commission and as Chair of Jersey's Fiscal Policy Panel.

== Honours ==
Dixon was appointed a Companion of the Order of St Michael and St George (CMG) in 2004.
