= Michael Adler (physician) =

British Professor of Genitourinary Medicine/Sexually Transmitted Diseases

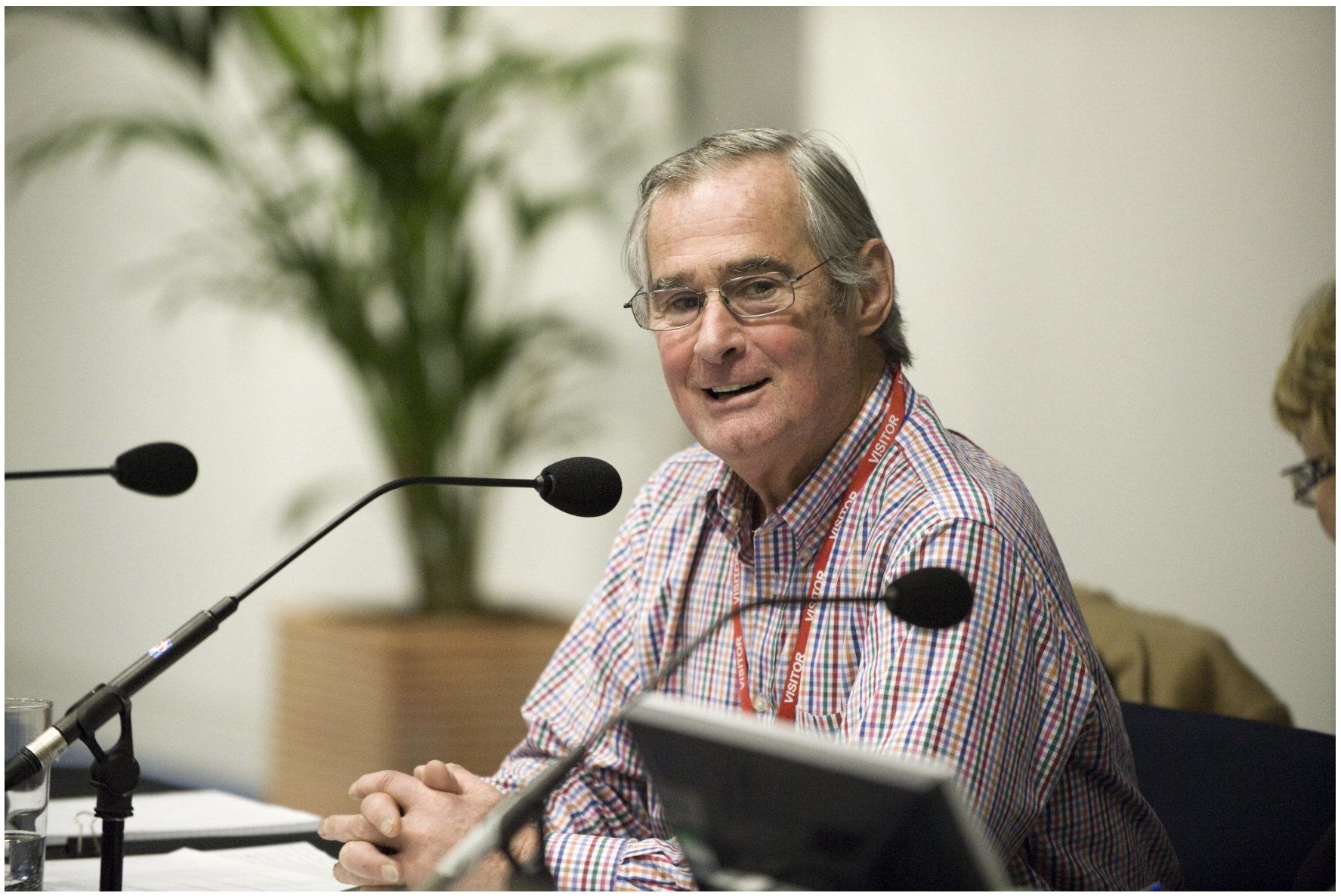
Professor Michael Adler at the Witness Seminar on 'The history of the National Sexual Attitudes and Lifestyles survey' (NATSAL) held by the History of Modern Biomedicine Research Group, 14/12/2009

Michael Adler CBE, FRCP, FFPH (born June 1939, London) is a British medical researcher and academic specializing in genitourinary medicine, sexually transmitted infections, and HIV/AIDS research. He is Emeritus Professor of Genitourinary Medicine/Sexually Transmitted Infections at the UCL Medical School, London. Adler was a prime mover in creating the first dedicated AIDS ward in the UK, which was opened by Diana, Princess of Wales in 1987.

== Early life and education ==
Born in London in June 1939, Adler is the son of Gerhard and Hella Adler, both German refugees and Jungian Analysts. He was educated at Bryanston School in Dorset and later attended Middlesex Hospital Medical School, qualifying as a physician in 1965.

== Academic and medical career ==
Adler established himself as a leading figure in the field of genitourinary medicine and HIV/AIDS research in the United Kingdom. He served as Head of Department from 1979 to 1994 and as Clinical Director for HIV/AIDS/GUM and Drugs Services from 1985 to 1994.

His primary research interests focus on epidemiology, particularly related to the development and control of sexually transmitted diseases. He was co-director of the Centre for Coordinating Epidemiological Studies of HIV/AIDS, set up by the Medical Research Council and the Department of Health (1987–1994). He was a prime mover in creating the first dedicated AIDS ward in the UK, the Broderip Ward at the Middlesex Hospital which was opened by Diana, Princess of Wales in 1987.

== Advisory Roles ==
Adler has served as an advisor to multiple governmental and international health organizations, including the British Government, the European Commission, and the World Health Organization of the United Nations. He has carried out numerous consultancies in the Developing World, particularly in Africa, India, Bosnia, China and St. Helena for WHO, UNAIDS, DIFID and VSO such as in Malawi where he was seconded to work for the President to develop an HIV strategy. Adler held the position of President of the British Association for Sexual Health and HIV from 1992 to 1993, and served on the Executive Committee of the International Union Against Sexually Transmitted Infections. Between 1993 and 1998, he was a member of the Governing Council of the International AIDS Society.

Adler's advisory work extended to various governmental committees in the United Kingdom, including serving on numerous committees for the Medical Research Council and the Department of Health. He was a founding member of the Expert Advisory Group on AIDS from 1990 to 2004 and was seconded to the Department of Health to design and coordinate the National Strategy for Sexual Health and HIV. He chaired the Royal College of Physicians Committee on Genitourinary Medicine and the Specialty Advisory Committee on Genitourinary Medicine.

== Editorial and publishing work ==
Adler was the founding editor of the journal AIDS in 1987. Throughout his career, he has published over 200 articles on sexually transmitted diseases and AIDS, and has written and edited numerous books. Among his notable publications are ABC of AIDS and ABC of STDs, published by the British Medical Journal. These texts are widely used internationally and are currently in their sixth edition. He has been a regular contributor to major media outlets, including The Times and The Sun, and is a frequent broadcaster.

== Personal life ==
Adler was married to Dame Karen Dunnell from 1979 to 1994, and subsequently to Baroness Margaret Jay from 1994 onwards.

== Honours and recognition ==
In 1999, Adler was elected to the Council of the Royal College of Physicians and served on the council until 2004. In 1996 he delivered the Lumelian Lecture, and in 2004 the Milroy Lecture, at the Royal College of Physicians. He was appointed Commander of the Order of the British Empire (CBE) for his contributions to medicine and public health in 1999.
