= Margaret Jay, Baroness Jay of Paddington =

British baroness (born 1939)

The Right Honourable The Baroness Jay of Paddington PC
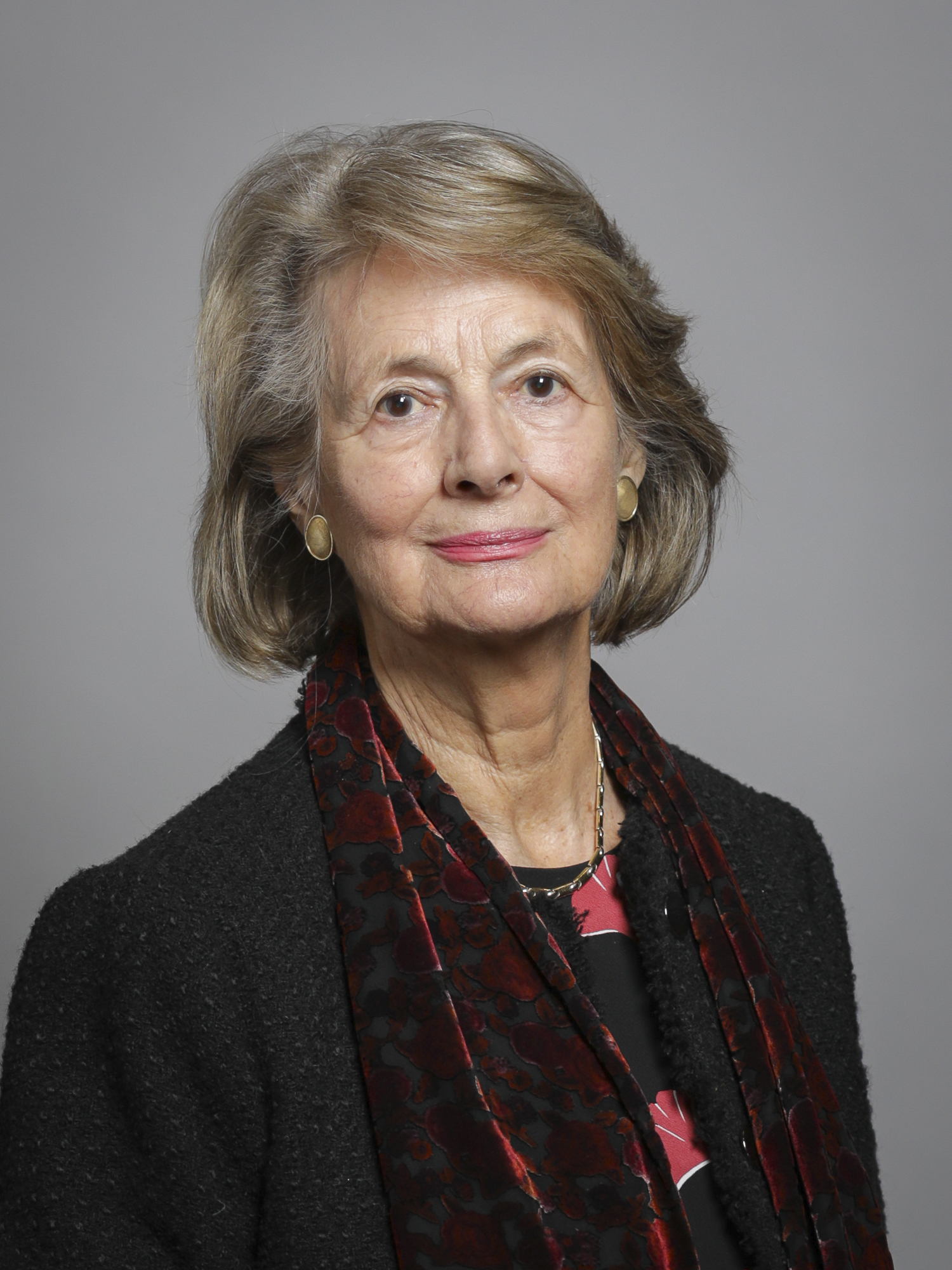
- Official portrait, 2019

Chair of the Constitution Committee
- In office 22 June 2010 – 14 May 2014
- Preceded by: The Lord Goodlad
- Succeeded by: The Baroness Taylor of Bolton

Leader of the House of Lords Lord Keeper of the Privy Seal
- In office 27 July 1998 – 8 June 2001
- Prime Minister: Tony Blair
- Deputy: The Lord Williams of Mostyn
- Preceded by: The Lord Richard
- Succeeded by: The Lord Williams of Mostyn

Minister for Women
- In office 27 July 1998 – 8 June 2001
- Prime Minister: Tony Blair
- Preceded by: Harriet Harman
- Succeeded by: Patricia Hewitt

Deputy Leader of the House of Lords
- In office 2 May 1997 – 27 July 1998
- Prime Minister: Tony Blair
- Leader: The Lord Richard
- Preceded by: The Earl Ferrers
- Succeeded by: The Lord Williams of Mostyn

Minister of State for Health
- In office 2 May 1997 – 27 July 1998
- Prime Minister: Tony Blair
- Preceded by: The Baroness Cumberlege
- Succeeded by: The Baroness Hayman

Member of the House of Lords
- Lord Temporal
- Life peerage 29 July 1992

Personal details
- Born: Margaret Ann Callaghan; 18 November 1939 (age 86)
- Party: Labour
- Spouses: Peter Jay (m. 1961; div. 1986) Michael Adler (m. 1994)
- Children: 3
- Parents: James Callaghan; Audrey Moulton
- Education: Somerville College, Oxford

Margaret Ann Jay, Baroness Jay of Paddington (née Callaghan; born 18 November 1939), is a British politician and former BBC television producer and presenter. She is a member of the Labour Party and is a daughter of James Callaghan, who was Prime Minister of the United Kingdom from 1976 to 1979.

== Early life and career ==
Margaret Ann Callaghan was born on 18 November 1939 to James and Audrey Callaghan (née Moulton). She was educated at Blackheath High School and Somerville College, Oxford.

From 1965 and 1977 she held production roles at the BBC, working on current affairs and further education television programmes. She then became a journalist on the BBC's prestigious Panorama programme, and Thames Television's This Week and presented the BBC 2 series Social History of Medicine. She has a strong interest in health issues, notably as a campaigner on HIV and AIDS. She was the founding director of the National AIDS Trust in 1987 and is also a patron of Help the Aged.

== Political career ==
Jay was appointed a life peer on 29 July 1992 with the title Baroness Jay of Paddington, of Paddington in the City of Westminster, and acted as an opposition whip in the House of Lords. Her status as the daughter of a former prime minister led to her being nicknamed 'Posh Spice' after her ennoblement. As a peer, in association with the shop workers' union, she led opposition to the liberalisation of Sunday trading hours.

Between 1994 and 1997 Baroness Jay was the chairman of the charity Attend (then National Association of Hospital and Community Friends). In 2003 she was elected vice-president of Attend.

After her party's election victory in May 1997, she became Minister of State for Health in the House of Lords. From 1998 she was Leader of the House of Lords, playing a pivotal role in the major reform that led to the removal of most of its hereditary members. On 11 November 1999 the government's reform bill (House of Lords Act 1999) was given royal assent and more than 660 hereditary peers lost their right to sit and vote in the Lords.

Jay retired from active politics in 2001. Among numerous non-executive roles that she has taken on since retiring from politics, she was a non-executive director of BT Group.

Jay was co-chair of the cross-party Iraq Commission (along with Tom King and Paddy Ashdown) which was established by the Foreign Policy Centre think-tank and Channel 4. Before her resignation, Jay gave an interview in which she said she attended a "pretty standard grammar school", which was actually Blackheath High School, an independent school. (Although, as Jay herself pointed out, during the period when she attended it was a direct-grant school – that is to say, a state-funded direct grant grammar school.) She drew ridicule when she said she could understand the needs of rural voters because she had a "little cottage" in the country, which turned out to be a £500,000 house in Ireland, and she also had a "substantial property" in the Chilterns.

== Personal life ==
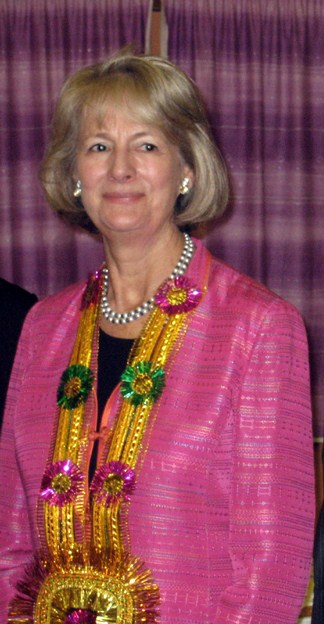
Baroness Jay in 2009

In 1961 Callaghan married her fellow journalist Peter Jay, a child of political parents: Douglas Jay, Labour MP and president of the Board of Trade, and Margaret Garnett, member of the Greater London Council. Peter Jay was appointed British Ambassador to the United States by his friend David Owen, Foreign Secretary in her father's government, leading to accusations of nepotism.

While in the United States, she met the journalist Carl Bernstein, with whom she had a much-publicised extramarital affair in 1979. Bernstein's then-wife Nora Ephron fictionalised the story in her novel, Heartburn, in which the character of Thelma is a thinly disguised representation of Jay. Peter Jay then had an affair with their nanny, fathering a child in the process (he originally denied paternity). The Jays divorced in 1986 after 25 years of marriage.

In 1994 she married Michael Adler, an AIDS specialist who had been chair of the National AIDS Trust when she was its director. She retained her surname from her first marriage. She has three children: Tamsin, Alice and Patrick.

== Arms ==
Coat of arms of Margaret Jay, Baroness Jay of Paddington
Escutcheon Quarterly Vert and Azure, in the former a portcullis chained Or, in the latter a lymphad with an anchor at its prow and masted also Or, the sail set Argent, and pennants flying Gules, over all a fess Or, to the sinister thereof a grassy mount thereon a hurst of oak trees and issuing therefrom passant to the dexter a wolf, all proper. Motto Malo laborare quam langure (I had rather labour than be idle)

Political offices
Preceded by The Earl Ferrers	Deputy Leader of the House of Lords; 1997–1998	Succeeded by The Lord Williams of Mostyn
Preceded by The Lord Richard	Leader of the House of Lords; 1998–2001	Succeeded by The Lord Williams of Mostyn
Preceded by The Lord Richard	Lord Privy Seal; 1998–2001	Succeeded by The Lord Williams of Mostyn
Preceded by Harriet Harman	Minister for Women; 1998–2001	Succeeded by Patricia Hewitt
Party political offices
Preceded by The Lord Richard	Leader of the Labour Party in the House of Lords; 1998–2001	Succeeded by The Lord Williams of Mostyn
