= Michael Scholar =

Sir Michael Charles Scholar, KCB (born 3 January 1942) is a British civil servant and former President of St John's College, Oxford.

== Education ==
He was educated at St Olave's Grammar School and St John's College, Cambridge (BA Classics and Moral Sciences 1964, MA, PhD, Research Fellow, Honorary Fellow 1999) and held positions at Harvard University, the University of California, Berkeley, and the University of Leicester.

He is the father of Sir Tom Scholar who was Permanent Secretary to the Treasury between 2016 and 2022.

== Civil Service career ==
He joined HM Treasury in 1969 and was appointed Assistant Principal in 1970. He was Private Secretary to the Chief Secretary to the Treasury 1974–76. From 1979 to 1981 he worked for Barclays Bank. He was then Private Secretary to the Prime Minister (1981–83), Under Secretary HM Treasury (1983–87), and Deputy Secretary (1987–93).

He was Permanent Secretary of the Welsh Office 1993–96 and of the Department of Trade and Industry 1996–2001.

== Oxford Master ==
He served as President of St John's College, Oxford from 1 August 2001 to 2012. He was also a Pro-Vice-Chancellor, Chairman of the Conference of Colleges, and Chairman of the Oxford University Careers Service, and a member of the Audit Committee.

He is also a non-executive Director of Legal and General Investment Management (Holdings).

== Honours ==
In 1996, he was appointed an Honorary Fellow of the University of Wales, Aberystwyth and 14 July 2003 he became an Honorary Fellow of Cardiff University. He was awarded an honorary doctorate by the University of Glamorgan in 1999.

He was appointed Companion of the Most Honourable Order of the Bath in 1991 and advanced to KCB in 1999.

Scholar is a keen musician and received the Associateship Diploma of the Royal College of Organists in 1965. He was Honorary Secretary of the Royal Opera House from 1988–93.

== UK Statistics Authority ==
On 1 April 2008, Sir Michael became the 3 day-a-week non-executive chairman of the new UK Statistics Authority (UKSA), through which the National Statistician is accountable to Parliament. The board oversees the Office for National Statistics, following the "independence" which it obtained from ministers in the Statistics and Registration Service Act 2007. It also has a duty to assess all UK government statistics from other departments.

Following Gordon Brown's announcement of new constitutional arrangements for public appointments, Sir Michael became, on 18 July 2007, the first such nominee to appear for vetting before the House of Commons Treasury Committee and to have his nomination subject to confirmation by the House. Sir Michael officially resigned from the post on 31 March 2012; he was succeeded by Sir Andrew Dilnot, CBE.

== Family ==
Scholar's eldest son, Thomas Scholar, also become a civil servant, rising to become Permanent Secretary to the Treasury, before being sacked by the then-new Prime Minister Liz Truss in 2022.

Two younger sons are Richard and John, the latter being a lecturer in English Literature at the University of Reading who also worked at the Treasury.

Academic offices
Preceded by Dr William Hayes	President of St John's College, Oxford; 2001-2012	Succeeded by Margaret Snowling
