= John Pullinger =

John James Pullinger CB

United Kingdom National Statistician
- In office 1 July 2014 – 30 June 2019
- Prime Minister: David Cameron; Theresa May
- Minister for the Cabinet Office: Francis Maude; Matt Hancock; Ben Gummer; Damian Green; David Lidington
- Preceded by: Dame Jil Matheson
- Succeeded by: Sir Ian Diamond

Personal details
- Born: 1 June 1959 (age 66)
- Education: University of Exeter; Harvard Business School

John James Pullinger CB (born 1 June 1959) was the National Statistician for the United Kingdom, serving in this role from 1 July 2014 until retiring on 30 June 2019. He was succeeded on an interim basis by Deputy National Statistician Jonathan Athow, and by Sir Ian Diamond on a permanent basis from October 2019. He became Chairman of the Electoral Commission on 1 May 2021.

== Career ==
Pullinger worked from 1980 to 1985 for the Department of Trade and Industry as a statistician. From 1985 to 1991 he worked in the Department of the Environment. From 1991 to 1992 he was Head of Pay Research at the Office of Manpower Economics. From 1992 he was Director and deputy director at the Office of National Statistics. From 2004 to 2014 he was Librarian of the House of Commons and Director General, Information Services. He was the President of the Royal Statistical Society between 2013 and 2014.

In 2014, Pullinger was appointed to replace Dame Jil Matheson as the UK National Statistician, Head of Governmental Statistical Service, Chief Executive of the UK Statistics Authority and Permanent Secretary of the ONS. He held this role until 2019. During this period he also chaired the United Nations Commission responsible for setting global measurement standards. As of 2015, Pullinger was paid a salary of between £150,000 and £154,999, making him one of the 328 most highly paid people in the British public sector at that time.

From 2019 to 2021 he was president of the International Association for Official Statistics. On 1 May 2021, Pullinger became Chairman of the Electoral Commission.

== Education and honours ==
Pullinger was educated at Alleyn's School, Dulwich, the University of Exeter where he gained a First Class Degree in Statistics and Geography in 1980 and Harvard Business School in 2003. In the 2014 New Year Honours, Pullinger was appointed Companion of the Order of the Bath (CB) "for services to Parliament and voluntary service to the community through Great Culverden Park Ltd.".

In 2016, Pullinger was awarded an honorary degree from the University of Exeter for outstanding achievements in the field of statistics and also received an honorary degree from the University of Essex the same year In 2018, he received an honorary degree from the University of the West of England. He is also a Fellow of the Academy of Social Sciences.

Academic offices
Preceded by Valerie Isham	President, Royal Statistical Society; 2013–14	Succeeded by Peter Diggle
Government offices
Preceded by Dame Jil Matheson	National Statistician; July 2014–June 2019	Succeeded by Sir Ian Diamond
