= Ian Diamond =

British statistician and academic (born 1954)

Sir Ian Diamond DL FRSE FBA FAcSS
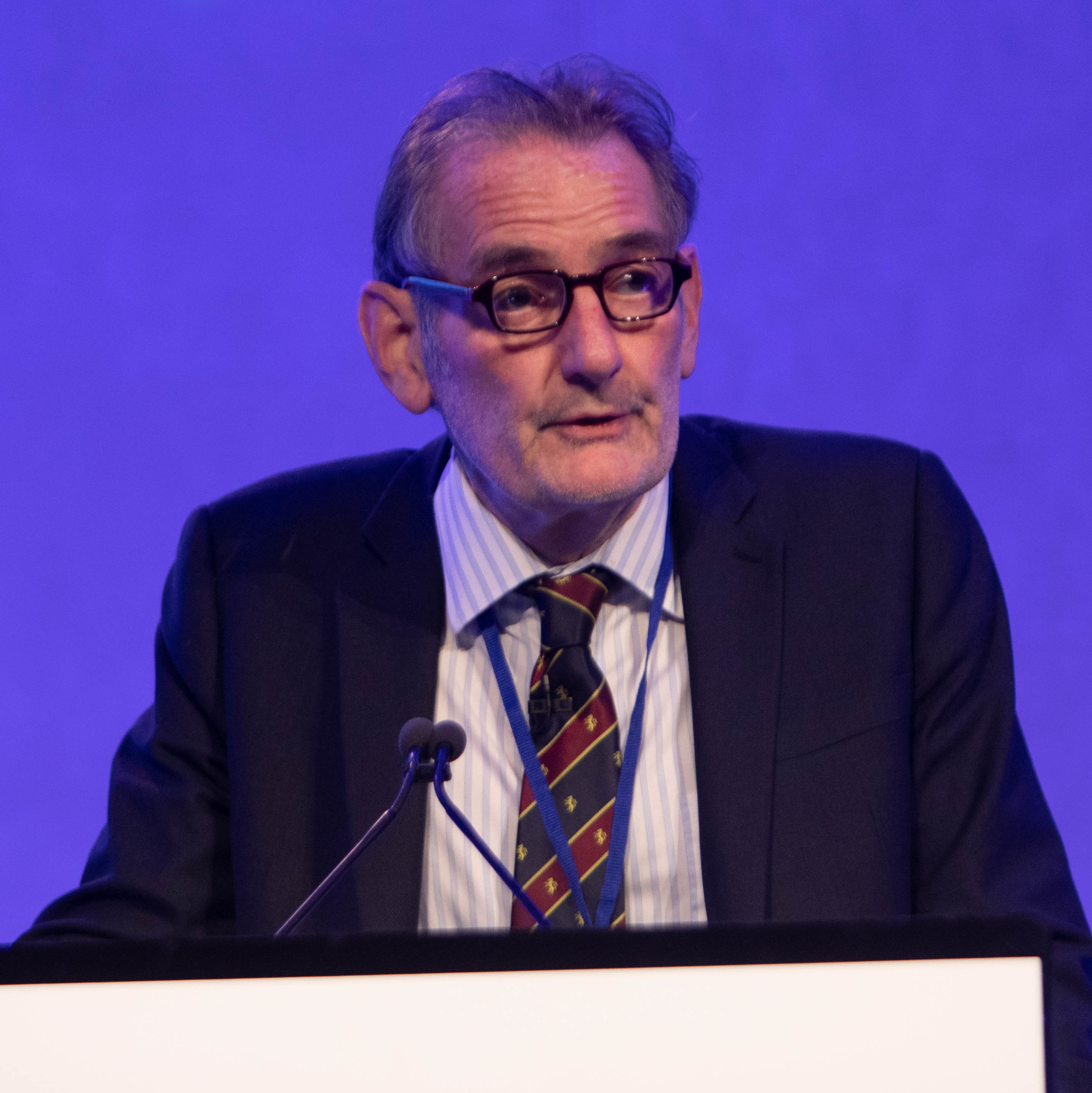
- Diamond in 2018

United Kingdom National Statistician
- In office 22 October 2019 – 9 May 2025
- Prime Minister: Boris Johnson; Liz Truss; Rishi Sunak; Keir Starmer
- Minister for the Cabinet Office: Oliver Dowden; Michael Gove; Steve Barclay; Michael Ellis; Edward Argar; Chris Philp; Jeremy Quin; Nick Thomas-Symonds
- Preceded by: John Pullinger
- Succeeded by: Emma Rourke (acting)

Principal and Vice-Chancellor of the University of Aberdeen
- In office 1 April 2010 – 31 July 2018
- Preceded by: Sir Duncan Rice
- Succeeded by: George Boyne

Personal details
- Born: 14 March 1954 (age 72) Kingskerswell, England
- Spouse(s): Jane, Lady Diamond
- Education: London School of Economics; University of St Andrews
- Profession: Statistician

Sir Ian David Diamond DL FRSE FBA FAcSS FLSW (born 14 March 1954) is a British statistician, academic, and administrator, who served as Principal and Vice-Chancellor of the University of Aberdeen until 2018. He was UK's National Statistician from October 2019 until May 2025.

== Early life and education ==
Diamond was born Kingskerswell, Devon, on 14 March 1954. He obtained a BSc degree in economics in 1975 and an MSc degree in statistics in 1976, both from the London School of Economics and Political Science (LSE). In 1981, he received a PhD degree in statistics from the University of St Andrews.

== Academic and non-executive career ==
Diamond became Principal of the University of Aberdeen in 2010, replacing Sir Duncan Rice. He announced in August 2017 that he would retire from this role, and was succeeded in the post by George Boyne in August 2018.

Diamond's previous appointments include Chief Executive of the Economic and Social Research Council, Chair of the Research Councils UK Executive Group, and Deputy Vice-Chancellor at the University of Southampton. Chair of Lloyds Banking Group Foundation for England and Wales, Visiting Fellow at Nuffield College, Oxford.

Diamond has been Chair of British Universities and Colleges Sport, Chair of the Department for International Development Research Advisory Group, 2018, Chair of Plan International UK, Chair of the Council for the Mathematical Sciences, and a board member of UK Research and Innovation, UK Statistics Authority, the Population Investigation Committee and Aberystwyth University. He stepped down as Chair of Edinburgh College of Further Education on his appointment as National Statistician.

Diamond was formerly a Trustee of the Iona Cathedral Trust, WWF UK, the National Centre for Social Research, UCAS and the British Academy and Chair of the Social Security Advisory Committee from 2018 to 2019.

His departure from the University of Aberdeen led to a pay-related controversy, where he was paid £282,000 over a supposed notice period where he was, in fact, no longer working for the university.

== Government service ==
Diamond has authored or co-authored seven books and government reports, contributed to a further 34, and authored over 100 academic papers. In 2016 he led a review of university finance in Wales which was commissioned by the Welsh Government, which recommended that grants towards tuition fees should be replaced with support for living costs instead.

Diamond's appointment as National Statistician in charge of the Office for National Statistics (ONS), in succession to John Pullinger, was announced on 6 August 2019, and he took office on 22 October 2019.

Diamond announced he would be leaving his post as National Statistician in May 2025 due to "ongoing health concerns", although media reports speculated his decision was also driven by criticism of the quality and reliability of ONS data. In September that year, he appeared before the Public Administration and Constitutional Affairs Committee where the chair, Simon Hoare MP, suggested Diamond had "been scapegoated".

== Personal life ==
Sir Ian Diamond is married to Jane Diamond. He is also a qualified football referee and cricket umpire.

== Honours and awards ==
- 1999: Elected to the UK Academy of Social Sciences (AcSS)
- 2000: Clifford C. Clogg Award from the Population Association of America
- 2005: Honorary Fellowship of Cardiff University
- 2005: Fellow of the British Academy (FBA)
- 2006: Honorary Degree of Doctor of Letters (DLitt) University of Glasgow
- 2009: Fellow of the Royal Society of Edinburgh (FRSE)
- 2012: Elected Burgess, City of Aberdeen
- 2013: Knight Bachelor, "for services to social science and higher education"
- 2013: Commissioned as a deputy lieutenant (DL) of Aberdeen
- Honorary Degrees: Cardiff, Glasgow

Academic offices
Preceded by Sir Duncan Rice	Principal and Vice Chancellor of the University of Aberdeen; April 2010 – July 2018	Succeeded by George Boyne
Government offices
Preceded by John Pullinger	National Statistician; October 2019 - May 2025	Succeeded by Emma Rourke (acting)
