= Sue Gray, Baroness Gray of Tottenham =

British former civil servant (born 1957)

The Right Honourable The Baroness Gray of Tottenham CBE
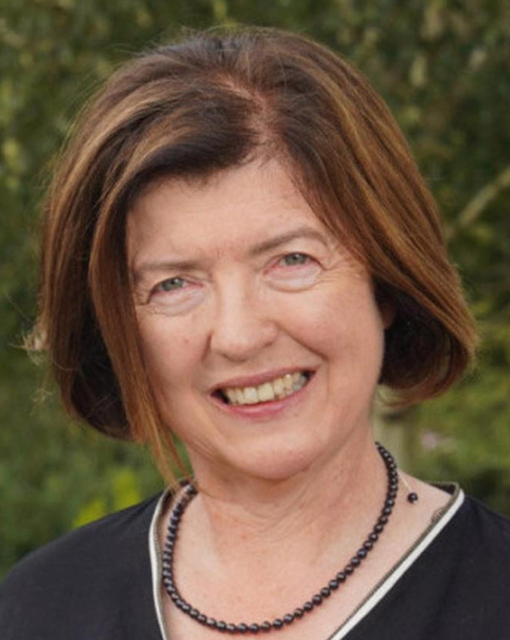
- Official portrait, c. 2021

Member of the House of Lords
- Lord Temporal
- Life peerage 4 February 2025

Downing Street Chief of Staff
- In office 5 July 2024 – 6 October 2024
- Prime Minister: Keir Starmer
- Preceded by: Liam Booth-Smith
- Succeeded by: Morgan McSweeney

Envoy to the Prime Minister for the Nations and Regions
- Designate; 6 October 2024 – 18 November 2024
- Prime Minister: Keir Starmer
- Preceded by: Office established
- Succeeded by: Office abolished

Chief of Staff to the Leader of the Opposition
- In office 1 September 2023 – 5 July 2024
- Leader: Keir Starmer
- Preceded by: Sam White (2022)
- Succeeded by: Lee Rowley

Second Permanent Secretary to the Cabinet Office
- In office 24 May 2021 – 2 March 2023
- Prime Minister: Boris Johnson; Liz Truss; Rishi Sunak
- Chancellor of the Duchy of Lancaster: Michael Gove; Steve Barclay; Kit Malthouse; Nadhim Zahawi; Oliver Dowden
- Preceded by: James Bowler
- Succeeded by: Michael Ellam (Second Permanent Secretary to the Cabinet Office, European Union and International Economic Affairs); Clara Swinson (Second Permanent Secretary to the Cabinet Office, Head of the Mission Delivery Unit)

Personal details
- Born: Susan Ann Gray; 1957 (age 68–69) London, England
- Party: Labour (since 2023)
- Spouse: Bill Conlon
- Children: Liam Conlon
- Occupation: Political adviser former civil servant
- Website: Government profile

Susan Ann Gray, Baroness Gray of Tottenham, CBE (born 1957) is a British politician, special adviser, and former civil servant who served as Downing Street Chief of Staff under Prime Minister Keir Starmer from July to October 2024, having previously served under Starmer as chief of staff to the Leader of the Opposition from 2023 to 2024.

She served from May 2021 to March 2023 as Second Permanent Secretary to the Cabinet Office, where she reported to the Chancellor of the Duchy of Lancaster. Her report into the Partygate scandal criticised the government led by Boris Johnson and contributed to his resignation as prime minister in September 2022 and ultimately to leaving Parliament in June 2023.

She resigned from the Civil Service in March 2023 to take up a job as chief of staff to the Leader of the Opposition, Keir Starmer. Her appointment provoked substantial controversy, and a Cabinet Office inquiry found that she had broken the Civil Service code. She was subject to scrutiny by the Advisory Committee on Business Appointments (Acoba), whose advice enabled her to work for the Labour Party from September 2023. When Starmer became Prime Minister following the 2024 General Election, Gray became his Downing Street chief of staff. Gray resigned after 4 months, citing the "intense commentary" around her position. Immediately after, her appointment as Envoy to the Prime Minister for the Nations and Regions was announced. In November 2024 it was confirmed Gray would not be assuming the role.

== Early life and background ==
Born in north London in 1957, Gray is the daughter of Irish immigrants who moved to Tottenham in the early 1950s; her father was a furniture salesman and her mother a barmaid. She attended a state-funded Roman Catholic school. Following her father's sudden death in 1975, Gray abandoned her plan of going to university and joined the Civil Service straight from school. Her mother committed suicide after her father's death.

Gray took a career break in the 1980s, a step described by journalist Sam McBride as "strikingly unorthodox". During this time, she ran the Cove Bar, a pub in Newry, a border town in Northern Ireland, during The Troubles, with her husband Bill Conlon, a country music singer from Portaferry, County Down. Peter Cardwell, a former special adviser to several ministers, said it had been speculated Gray was a spy at this time, though Gray denied it. According to the Belfast Telegraph, her car was stopped one night by IRA paramilitaries who wanted to take it, only for her to be allowed to pass after a voice said "that's Sue Gray from The Cove, let her go on".

The family returned to London in 1987. Gray has family connections to Northern Ireland and is reported to have a fondness for the region, which she visits with her husband. She has two sons, including Liam Conlon, who is the chair of the Labour Party Irish Society and Member of Parliament for Beckenham and Penge.

== Career ==
=== Cabinet Office ===
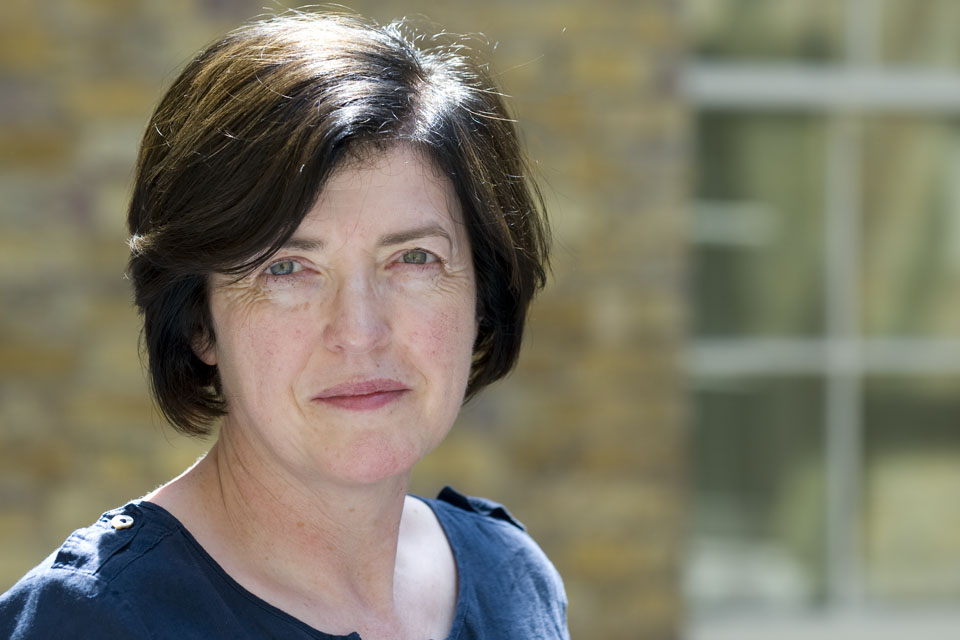
Official portrait, 2014

Gray joined the Cabinet Office in the late 1990s, having previously worked at the departments of Health, Transport, and Work and Pensions. From 2012 she was director-general of the Propriety and Ethics team, and head of the Private Offices Group, directly under the Cabinet Secretary. This role gave her a wide-ranging remit over the operation of ministerial offices, public appointments, and government ethics. She frequently dealt with sensitive matters and 'crises' arising from the operation of government. As such, she was described in 2017 as "the woman who runs the country".

She was appointed a Commander of the Order of the British Empire (CBE) in the 2007 New Year Honours for services as Director, Propriety and Ethics, and Head of Management Unit for Private Offices, Cabinet Office.

In 2011, Gray advised Michael Gove that conducting government business via private e-mail accounts would make it exempt from transparency legislation. The following year, the Information Commissioner found this guidance to be incorrect and ruled that emails that pertained to departmental business would be subject to the Freedom of Information Act.

As part of her miscellaneous duties within the Cabinet Office, Gray was responsible for the 2010 reform of non-departmental public bodies.

She conducted the Cabinet Office inquiry into the behaviour of Andrew Mitchell during the 'Plebgate' affair in 2012. Mitchell later resigned as Chief Whip.

She was responsible for the inquiry into the behaviour of Damian Green in 2017. Green, a close ally of the then prime minister, Theresa May, was First Secretary of State and Minister for the Cabinet Office. He had been accused of sexual harassment and misusing office computers to view pornography. Green was sacked from his ministerial positions in December 2017, but resisted calls to stand down as an MP.

=== Northern Ireland Executive ===
In January 2018, the Northern Ireland Executive announced that Gray would transfer to the Northern Ireland Civil Service as Permanent secretary of the Department of Finance in the Northern Ireland Executive from May 2018. In April 2018, it was announced that Gray had been replaced at the Cabinet Office by Helen MacNamara.

In 2020, Gray sought but failed to be appointed as the head of the Northern Ireland Civil Service, and in a subsequent interview with the BBC said: "I suspect people may have thought that I perhaps was too much of a challenger, or a disrupter. I am both…"

=== Return to the Cabinet Office ===
In May 2021, Gray returned to Whitehall to become the Second Permanent Secretary to the Cabinet Office, in charge of policy on the Union and the constitution. She reported to the Chancellor of the Duchy of Lancaster - initially Michael Gove, who was replaced in September 2021 by Steve Barclay.

==== Partygate ====
Following press reports about gatherings and parties on government premises during restrictions related to the COVID-19 pandemic in December 2021 – a scandal which became widely known as "Partygate" – the Cabinet Secretary Simon Case initiated and led an investigation into the allegations. A few days later he recused himself when it became known that an event had been held in his own office, and subsequently Gray took over the investigation.

Whether Prime Minister Boris Johnson knew about and participated in gatherings at Downing Street was part of the investigation. Gray's initial findings were published on 31 January 2022. In the report, Gray condemned "a serious failure" in the standards of leadership, and stated that a string of gatherings were "difficult to justify" while millions were unable to meet their friends and relatives. Publication of the full report was postponed pending the completion of an investigation by the Metropolitan Police. The police reported in May 2022 that their inquiries had resulted in 126 fixed penalty notices being issued. Gray's final report was delivered to Johnson on 25 May 2022 and was published later that morning. In a December 2022 article in The Guardian, Rajeev Syal wrote that friends of Gray said that she was "bruised" by the investigation.

=== Departure from the Civil Service ===
In March 2023, it was reported that Sir Keir Starmer, leader of the Labour Party and the Leader of the Opposition, was considering appointing Gray as his chief of staff. Gray resigned from her post as Cabinet Office Second Permanent Secretary and left the Civil Service. Gray started her role as Starmer's chief of staff on 4 September 2023 and formally joined the Labour Party in November 2023.

Her appointment was subject to the approval of the Advisory Committee on Business Appointments (ACOBA) and ultimately the prime minister, Rishi Sunak, who could have blocked the appointment. It was Gray's first party political role.

Following her resignation and her prospective employment within the Labour Party, some Conservative MPs criticised Gray: MP Alex Stafford told the BBC that Gray's appointment "undermines the work that she's done and undermines the civil service." Nadine Dorries questioned her ability to act impartially in her role as author of the Partygate report. By contrast former minister Francis Maude stated he had not the "slightest reason to question either her integrity or her political impartiality" and Bob Kerslake, former head of the civil service, stated he could not see a problem with the appointment given "the role is as much an organising one as a political one" and noted that Jonathan Powell and Ed Llewellyn, Tony Blair's and David Cameron's chiefs of staff respectively, were both previously employed in the civil service.

In June 2023, the Advisory Committee on Business Appointments recommended a six-month break from the date of Gray's resignation, meaning she could work for the Labour Party from September 2023. In July 2023, a Cabinet Office probe found that Gray had broken the civil service code with regard to her talks with the Labour Party.

=== Downing Street Chief of Staff ===
Following Labour's victory in the 2024 general election and Keir Starmer becoming prime minister, Gray became his Downing Street Chief of Staff.

Rumours reported by The Guardian alleged that she adopted a "micromanagerial" leadership style with substantial control over ministerial and special adviser appointments, and had "extraordinary" control over access to Starmer and his agenda. The allegations were contested and emerged in the context of conflicting briefings from allies of Gray and Morgan McSweeney.

She received a salary of £170,000, £3,000 more than the prime minister, and more than any cabinet minister.

On 6 October 2024, Gray resigned as chief of staff, citing the "intense commentary" around her position risking becoming a distraction to the government. Immediately afterwards, her appointment as Envoy to the Prime Minister for the Nations and Regions was announced. In November 2024 it was confirmed Gray would not be assuming the role.

=== House of Lords ===
In December 2024, it was announced that Prime Minister Keir Starmer had nominated Gray for a life peerage in the House of Lords, where she would sit as a member of the Labour Party. She was created Baroness Gray of Tottenham, of Tottenham in the London Borough of Haringey on 4 February 2025.

Gray delivered her maiden speech on 27 March 2025. In her speech, she reflected on her career in the Civil Service and paid tribute to several public figures, including former prime minister Theresa May, for their support. Gray also commented on Starmer's plans to cut the Civil Service, warning him to be "careful" in doing so and calling on politicians to stop using derogatory language against civil servants.

== Reputation ==
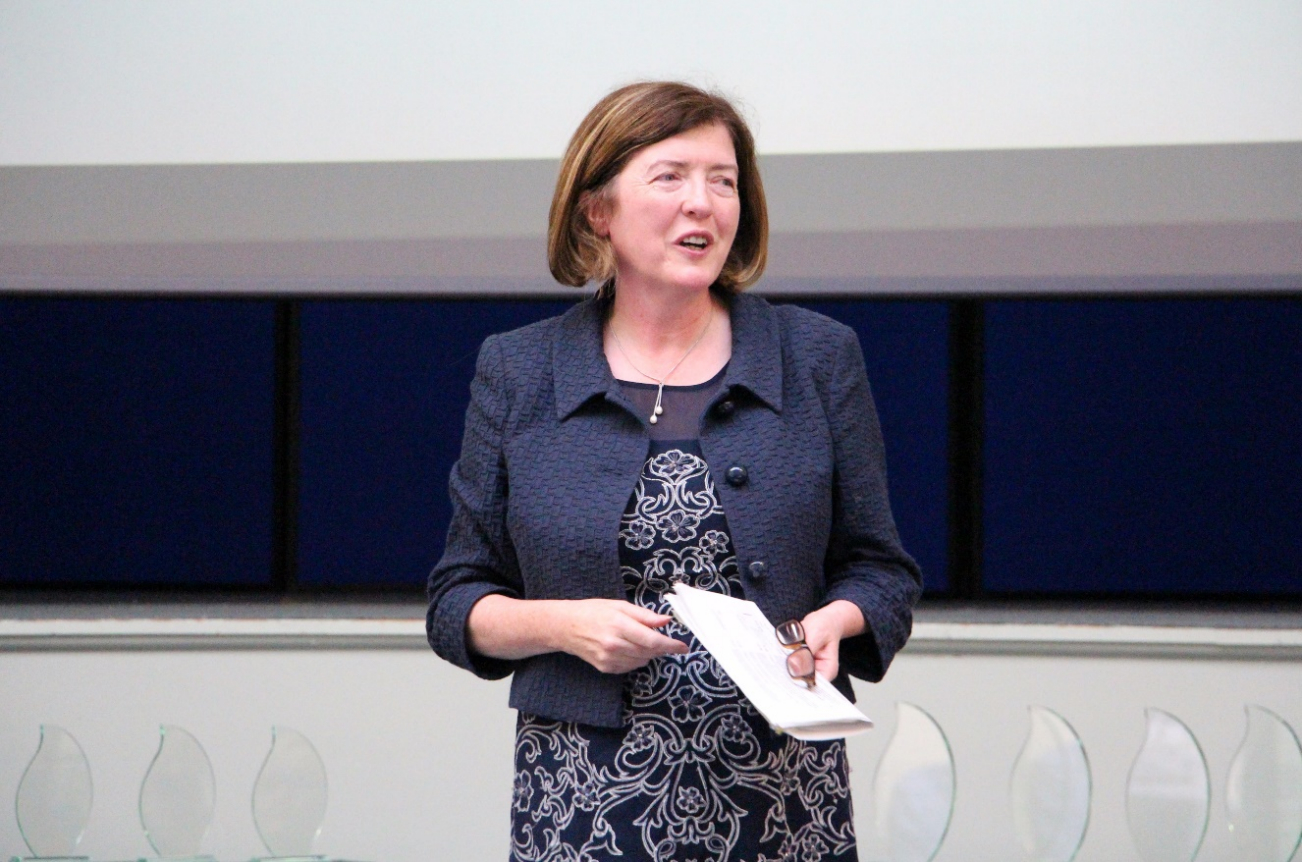
Gray speaking at an awards ceremony in September 2016

Gray has been portrayed as relatively unknown but once highly influential, and has been described as "an enigma". In 2015, a profile by Chris Cook, then policy editor for the BBC's Newsnight, said that she was "notorious… for her determination not to leave a document trail", had advised special advisers how to destroy emails through "double-deletion" and made at least six interventions "to tell departments to fight disclosures under the Freedom of Information Act". She was described by former prime minister Gordon Brown, in his memoir, as someone who could be counted on for "wise advice when – as all too regularly happened – mini-crises and crises befell".

Rajeev Syal in The Guardian described her as "an uncompromising operator". Political journalist Andrew Gimson wrote: "All power to the Civil Service is her modus operandi. She owes her allegiance to the permanent government and the deep state." Former cabinet minister Oliver Letwin wrote of her: "Unless she agrees, things just don't happen. Cabinet reshuffles, departmental reorganizations, the whole lot – it's all down to Sue Gray".

In 2023, after her appointment as Starmer's chief of staff was announced, Gray was named seventh in a list drawn up by the New Statesman, of "most influential" people "shaping Britain's progressive politics" and having "some affiliation with the Left".

Government offices
New title Job re-graded	Director General, Propriety and Ethics; 2012–2018	Succeeded by Helen MacNamara
Preceded by David Sterling	Permanent Secretary, Department of Finance, Northern Ireland Executive; 2018–2021	Succeeded by Colum Boyle
Preceded by James Bowler	Second Permanent Secretary, Cabinet Office; 2021–2023	Vacant
Preceded by Liam Booth-Smith	Downing Street Chief of Staff; 2024	Succeeded by Morgan McSweeney
