= General Register Office =

Civil registries in Commonwealth-related nations

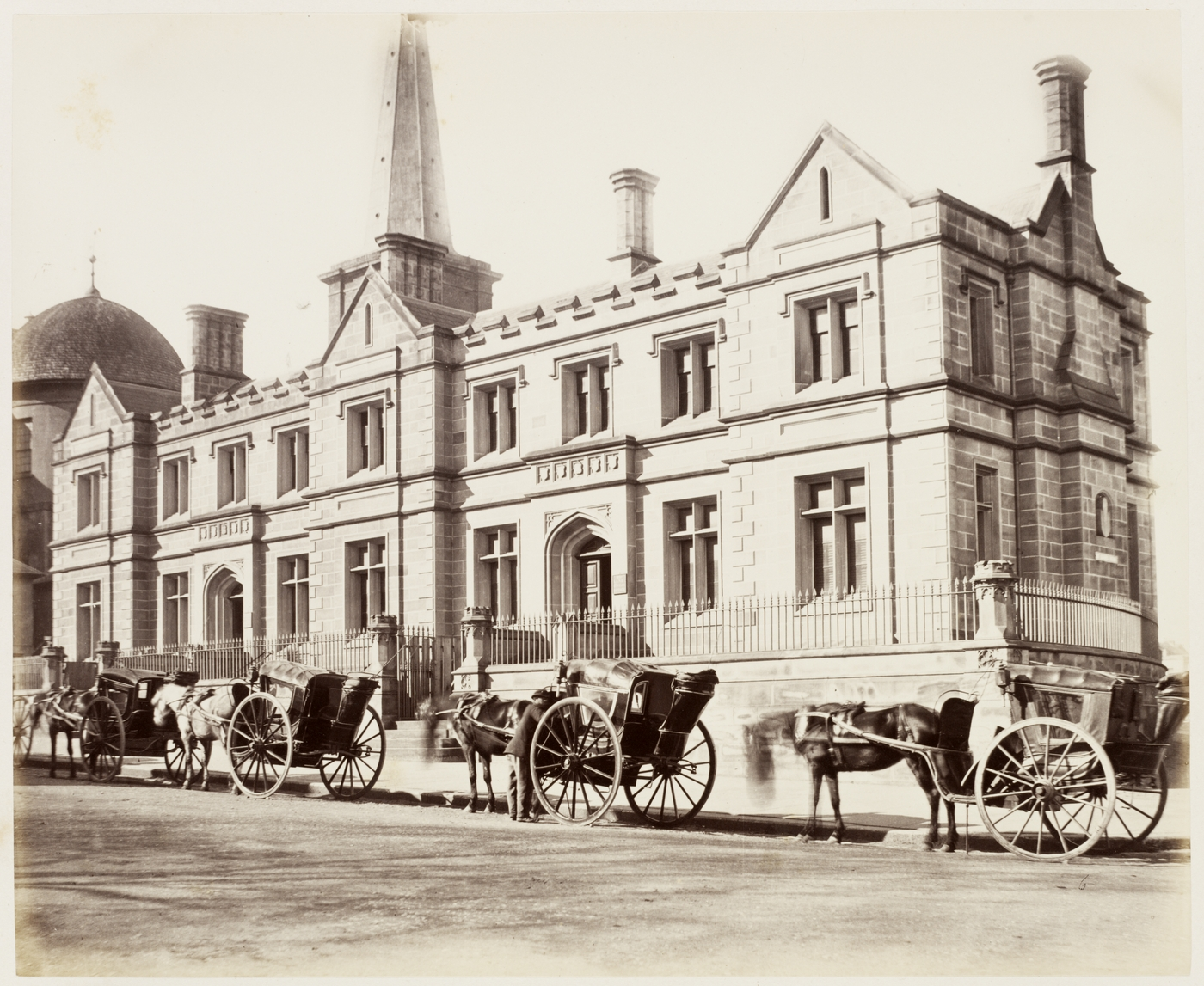
Registrar-General's Office in Sydney, Australia (1872)

General Register Office or General Registry Office (GRO) is the name given to the civil registry in the United Kingdom, many other Commonwealth nations and Ireland. The GRO is the government agency responsible for the recording of vital records such as births, deaths, and marriages (or BDM), which may also include adoptions, stillbirths, civil unions, etc., and historically, sometimes included records relating to deeds and other property transactions.

The director of a General Register Office is often titled Registrar General or Registrar-General.

== By country ==
=== Australia ===
The Australian states and territories have similar registries for birth, death and marriage, although their histories differ. These agencies are usually subordinate to the state Attorney-General Department or Department of Justice. The Australian Bureau of Statistics is responsible for collating the statistics based on these records.

ACT: Until 1930, records were registered in the New South Wales Registry of Births, Deaths and Marriages. Since December 2014, an agency known as Access Canberra, a "one-stop shop for ACT Government customer and regulatory services", part of the Chief Minister, Treasury and Economic Development Directorate, is responsible for BDM registrations.

NSW: In New South Wales, compulsory civil registration began in 1856. The Act for Registering Births, Deaths and Marriages 1856 allowed the Governor to appoint a Registrar General and establish an office in Sydney to register all births, deaths and marriages in the colony. District registrars recorded the details. The Registry of Births, Deaths and Marriages is now an agency within the NSW Department of Customer Service. About 90% of births in the state are now registered online.

Northern Territory: In the Northern Territory, the Registrar-General is responsible for both Births, Deaths and Marriages and the Land Titles Office.

Queensland: Queensland started compulsory registration of life events in 1856, under the Registrar General. Today, births, deaths and marriages are administered by a unit within the Department of Justice.

South Australia: In South Australia, the local equivalent of the GRO is commonly known as the Registry of Births Deaths and Marriages, within the state Attorney-General's Department.

"General Law Title" or the "Old System Title" was the English land law adopted at the time of foundation of South Australia as a colony in December 1836. The General Registry Office (GRO) holds deeds and records of land transactions from 1837 until the implementation of Real Property Act in 1858 (known as Torrens title). After this, all new land transactions were conducted under the new system, using a land title. The role of the GRO included property transactions (mortgages, conveyances, leases, land grants, indentures, wills, probate), as well as deeds for a number of other actions (such as Deed Poll name changes). The documents called "memorials" represent those original deeds registered and held by the GRO, whereas the certified copies held by the GRO were known as "deposits" or "enrolments".

The General Registry Office and Old Systems land records are (as of July 2019) held at the Land Services Group at Netley, where there are alphabetical indices of records from 1842 to the present, for land that does not fall under the Torrens title. These records include those of early landowners and pioneer settlers.

Tasmania: The Registrar of Births, Deaths, and Marriages was established in 1838, which was the first of all Australian colonies to take over this function from the churches. It went through various administrative and name changes until 1989, when it became the Registrar of Births, Deaths, and Marriages, under the Department of Justice.

Victoria: The Registrar-General's Department was created on 18 January 1853, with the proclamation of the Registration (Births, Deaths and Marriages) Act. From 1 July that year, all residents of the colony of Victoria had to register births and deaths with their local District Registrar. Norman Campbell was the first permanent appointee to the position of Registrar-General. After his death, the position of Registrar-General devolved to statistician William Henry Archer (1825 – 29 April 1909), who had acted in that position before Campbell's appointment and was seen as the driving force behind the department.

The current incarnation of the department is Registry of Births, Deaths and Marriages Victoria (BDM).

Western Australia : Civil registration of births, deaths and marriages has been compulsory in Western Australia since 1841. From its beginnings as a function of the Colonial Secretary's Office (1828−1924), the administration of BDM registration has gone through a number of changes. Since 1999 The Registry of Births, Deaths and Marriages has been the responsible entity.

=== Canada ===
The Registrar General of Canada title belongs to a government minister with entirely different and unrelated functions – such as registration of all letters patent, commissions, instruments, proclamations, and certain other documents.

Each province and territory in Canada has a Registrar General responsible for collecting and storing records of births, marriages and deaths in their respective regions.

=== Hong Kong ===
The Hong Kong Government established a Registrar General in 1845, four years after the British acquired Hong Kong in 1841. The post was renamed the Secretariat for Chinese Affairs in 1913, and then Home Affairs in 1949. On 1 April 1949, the Land Office merged with various other functions, which included the Marriage Registry, to form the Registrar General's Department. In May 1993, the Registrar General's Department was disestablished and the Land Registry formed. The Births and Deaths General Register Office is now responsible for recording births and deaths, as part of the Immigration Department.

=== India ===
The Central Births, Deaths and Marriages Registration Act of 1886 provided for voluntary registration throughout British India. Twenty years after independence, Registration of Births and Death Act (RBD Act) of 1969 made registration mandatory. The Registrar General, India (RGI) coordinates registration activities across the country, although state governments are responsible for the collection of data.

=== Ireland ===
The General Register Office (Oifig An Ard-Chláraitheora) is the central civil repository for records relating to births, deaths, marriages, civil partnerships and adoptions in Republic of Ireland. It is part of the Department of Employment Affairs and Social Protection. The Registrar General is responsible for the management of the system of registration in Ireland, while the Health Service Executive (HSE) is responsible for the day to day delivery of the Civil Registration Service. Record-keeping started in 1864, and many records are available online.

=== Sri Lanka ===
The Registrar General's Department of Sri Lanka is responsible for registration of birth, marriages and deaths as well as and legal documents pertaining to properties (land and title registration). The post was created in 1864.

=== UK ===
==== England and Wales ====
The post of Registrar General was created by the Births and Deaths Registration Act 1836, and registration began in 1837. The Registrar General was soon given other responsibilities, such as the conduct of every census in England and Wales since 1841, and eventually came to be head of a primarily statistical organisation. In England and Wales, birth registration with the state began on 1 July 1837; however, only became compulsory in 1875.

In 1970, with the creation of the Office of Population Censuses and Surveys by merging the GRO and the Government Social Survey Department, the GRO became just one division of the new office, headed by a Deputy Registrar General. With the creation of the Office for National Statistics in 1996, the post of Registrar General was merged with that of Head of the Government Statistical Service, who became the National Statistician.

Following the 2008 implementation of the Statistics and Registration Service Act 2007, the General Register Office became a part of the Identity & Passport Service (as of 2020 HM Passport Office – which in 2014 lost its executive agency status and became a division within the Home Office). Since 2020 the post has been held by Myrtle Lloyd, who is also Chief Operating Officer of HM Passport Office, and sits on the executive management board of the Home Office.

==== Scotland ====
The GROS was a non-ministerial directorate of the Scottish Government that administered the registration of births, deaths, marriages, divorces and adoptions in Scotland from 1854 to 2011. It was also responsible for the statutes relating to the formalities of marriage and conduct of civil marriage in Scotland. It administered the census of Scotland's population every ten years. It also kept the Scottish National Health Service Central Register.

On 1 April 2011 it was merged with the National Archives of Scotland to form National Records of Scotland. All the former department's functions continue as part of the new body.

==== Northern Ireland ====
The General Register Office (Northern Ireland), or GRONI, is responsible for the civil registration of births, deaths, marriages, civil partnerships and adoptions, as well as administering marriage and civil partnership law in Northern Ireland.
