= National Statistician =

The National Statistician is the Chief Executive of the UK Statistics Authority, and the Head of the UK Government Statistical Service. The office was created by the Statistics and Registration Service Act 2007.

Following the retirement of John Pullinger, Sir Ian Diamond was announced as the new National Statistician in October 2019. In May 2025, Diamond announced he would be leaving his post in May 2025 due to "ongoing health concerns", although media reports speculated his decision was also driven by criticism of the quality and reliability of ONS data.

As of August 2026, André Loranger is the current National Satistician.

== Status ==
They were de facto permanent secretaries until an independent review by retired civil servant Sir Robert Devereux recommended the separation of the role of National Statistician from the Permanent Secretary of the ONS. Darren Tierney was appointed as the permanent secretary in August 2025. As the ONS incorporated the OPCS, the Director also became the Registrar General for England and Wales. Following the implementation of the Statistics and Registration Service Act 2007, the General Register Office continues to be part of a ministerially accountable department, becoming a part of the Identity & Passport Service in the Home Office and the post of Registrar-General is now held by its head.

== National Statisticians ==
- The first Director of ONS was Tim Holt. Subsequent Directors have had this additional title, the National Statistician.
- The second Director was Len Cook, who had previously held a similar post in New Zealand.
- He was succeeded by Dame Karen Dunnell on 1 September 2005.
- Jil Matheson succeeded Karen Dunnell on 1 September 2009.
- John Pullinger succeeded Jil Matheson on 1 July 2014 and retired in June 2019.
- Ian Diamond succeeded John Pullinger on 22 October 2019; he was re-appointed for a second, five-year, term from April 2023, but left in May 2025.
- As of August 2026, André Loranger is the current National Satistician.
