= Government Statistical Service =

The Government Statistical Service (GSS) is the community of all civil servants in the United Kingdom who work in the collection, production and communication of official statistics. It includes not only statisticians, but also economists, social researchers, IT professionals, and secretarial and clerical staff. Members of the GSS work in the Office for National Statistics, most UK Government departments, and the devolved administrations. The GSS publishes around 2,000 sets of statistics each year, as well as providing professional advice and analysis to decision-makers.

The National Statistician is the Head of the GSS.

The Government Statistician Group (GSG) is a subset of the GSS, and is the community of professional government statisticians who meet the standards for statistical qualifications and competence set by the National Statistician's Office.

== History ==
The GSS was formed in 1968, in response to a series of recommendations made by Claus Moser, director of the Central Statistical Office, who recognised that 'society was going through radical changes, and social and economic policy was being made on incorrect and out of date statistics. Data was not being shared efficiently across government delaying its use in decisions. There was duplication of work in some areas and gaps in others. It lacked a joined-up approach across government.'
