= Statistics and Registration Service Act 2007 =

Act of the Parliament of the United Kingdom

Statistics and Registration Service Act 2007 (Note: Section 76.)
- Act of Parliament
- Parliament of the United Kingdom
- Long title: An Act to establish and make provision about the Statistics Board; to make provision about offices and office-holders under the Registration Service Act 1953; and for connected purposes.
- Citation: 2007 c. 18
- Introduced by: Gordon Brown MP, Chancellor of the Exchequer (Commons); Lord Davies of Oldham (Lords)
- Territorial extent: England and Wales; Scotland (in part); Northern Ireland (in part); (Note: Section 75.)

Dates
- Royal assent: 26 July 2007
- Commencement: Various (Note: Section 74.)
Other legislation
Amends	Finance Act 1969; House of Commons Disqualification Act 1975; Agricultural Statistics Act 1979; Inheritance Tax Act 1984; Parliamentary Constituencies Act 1986; Social Security Administration Act 1992; Value Added Tax Act 1994; Political Parties, Elections and Referendums Act 2000; Scottish Public Services Ombudsman Act 2002
Amended by	Counter-Terrorism Act 2008; Wales Act 2017; Digital Economy Act 2017; Data Protection Act 2018; Sentencing Act 2020; Pre-release Access to Official Statistics (Scotland) Act 2021; Health and Care Act 2022
Relates to	Registration Service Act 1953

Status: Amended

History of passage through Parliament

Text of statute as originally enacted

Revised text of statute as amended

The Statistics and Registration Service Act 2007 (c. 18) is an act of the Parliament of the United Kingdom which established the UK Statistics Authority (UKSA). It came into force in April 2008. Sir Michael Scholar was appointed as the first chair of the UKSA.

The act established the UK Statistics Authority as a non-ministerial department that employs the National Statistician. The National Statistician has an office to support them, the Office for National Statistics.

== Provisions ==
The act establishes proper employment status and rights for registration officers, including local authority employees.

== Reception ==
The legislation was criticised by the Statistics Users' Forum for only providing for the independence of the Office for National Statistics but not the independent of other bodies such as those which produce statistics relating to education, health and crime.
