= Non-ministerial government department =

Type of UK government department

Non-ministerial government departments, also called non-ministerial departments (NMDs), are a type of department of the United Kingdom government that deals with matters for which direct political oversight (and thus democratic accountability), through a minister of state forming part of the executive government, has been judged unnecessary or inappropriate. NMDs are typically headed by senior civil servants or subject matter experts. Some fulfil a regulatory or inspection function; their status is therefore intended to protect them from political interference in their administration of an extant regulatory scheme. Some are headed by a permanent office holder, such as a Permanent Secretary or Second Permanent Secretary, or a head appointed for a fixed term which does not correlate necessarily with the parliamentary (and thus government) term.

In other jurisdictions, such bodies could typically be named "authorities", "commissions", "offices", "statutory boards", "agencies", or "regulators".

== Overview ==
The status of an NMD varies considerably from one to another. For example:

- A number of NMDs are highly independent bodies: for example, the Charity Commission; economic regulators such as the Competition and Markets Authority; and Ofcom and its predecessor the Postal Services Commission. These bodies are "creatures of statute": they implement legislation which they have no power to change (although they may recommend, usually to the administering department or the minister ultimately responsible for the policy area, changes to their regulatory framework in order to improve their efficacy or efficiency). The decision making independence and party political neutrality of an NMD is protected by giving it the status of a government department, but providing that is it accountable only to Parliament rather than to a elected government minister of state. Their budgets are usually set by the Treasury, not by the department from which they were cleaved; they are often funded through licence fees or similar payments paid by participants in the industries regulated by the particular NMD.
- Some are standard setting bodies composed of experts: For example, Ofsted, which sets particular standards to be met and curricula to be taught in schools.
- While senior officials in HM Revenue and Customs, the tax collection agency, work closely with cabinet ministers on policy and legislative changes (in particular to address tax avoidance), neither ministers nor Parliament can interfere in day-to-day decisions as to what tax is owed by whom. While key, generally applicable taxation policies are set in legislation and revised each year in the Finance Act, the function is insulated in an NMD because party-politically motivated (biased) pursuance of tax obligations is antithetical to the rule of law.
- The Food Standards Agency is an NMD which was created by merging large parts of the Department of Health with a portion of the Ministry of Agriculture, Fisheries and Food. The aim was to reassure the public (after the BSE/vCJD crisis) that decisions about food safety would in future be taken by a qualified, independent body free from political control. Because the agency was separated and its structure designed to take politics out of food safety, it does not need to and does not seek ministerial approval for actions it determines to take.

== List of non-ministerial departments ==
A list of NMDs is maintained by the Cabinet Office, the central and coordinating department of the UK civil service. Several of them have functions relating only to parts of the UK, especially England or England and Wales, as these bodies' functions tend to relate to matters devolved, in the other jurisdictions, to the regional (or national) governments. As of March 2026, the list states that the following 20 are in existence:

- Charity Commission for England and Wales
- Competition and Markets Authority (CMA)
- Crown Prosecution Service (England and Wales)
- Food Standards Agency (England, Wales and Northern Ireland)
- Forestry Commission (England)
- Government Actuary's Department
- Government Legal Department
- HM Land Registry (England and Wales)
- HM Revenue and Customs (HMRC)
- The National Archives
- National Crime Agency (NCA)
- National Savings and Investments (NS&I)
- Office of Rail and Road (ORR) (Great Britain)
- Office of Gas and Electricity Markets (Ofgem) (Great Britain)
- Office of Qualifications and Examinations Regulation (Ofqual) (England)
- Office for Standards in Education, Children's Services and Skills (Ofsted) (England)
- Serious Fraud Office (SFO) (England, Wales and Northern Ireland)
- Supreme Court of the United Kingdom
- UK Statistics Authority
- Water Services Regulation Authority (Ofwat) (England and Wales)
