= Office of Population Censuses and Surveys =

Office of Population Censure and Surveys

The Office of Population Censuses and Surveys (OPCS) was created in May 1970 through the merger of the General Register Office and the Government Social Survey Department.

It was a forerunner and constituent, with the UK Central Statistical Office, of the Office for National Statistics, in which they combined in 1996 under a single director who, from 2000 was also known as the National Statistician. The director of OPCS was also Registrar-General for England and Wales.

== See also ==
- OPCS-4
