= List of people associated with Wadham College, Oxford =

This is a list of Wadham College, Oxford people, including alumni, Fellows, Deans and Wardens of the College. An alphabetical list of alumni of Wadham college can be found here.

== Alumni ==
=== Academics ===
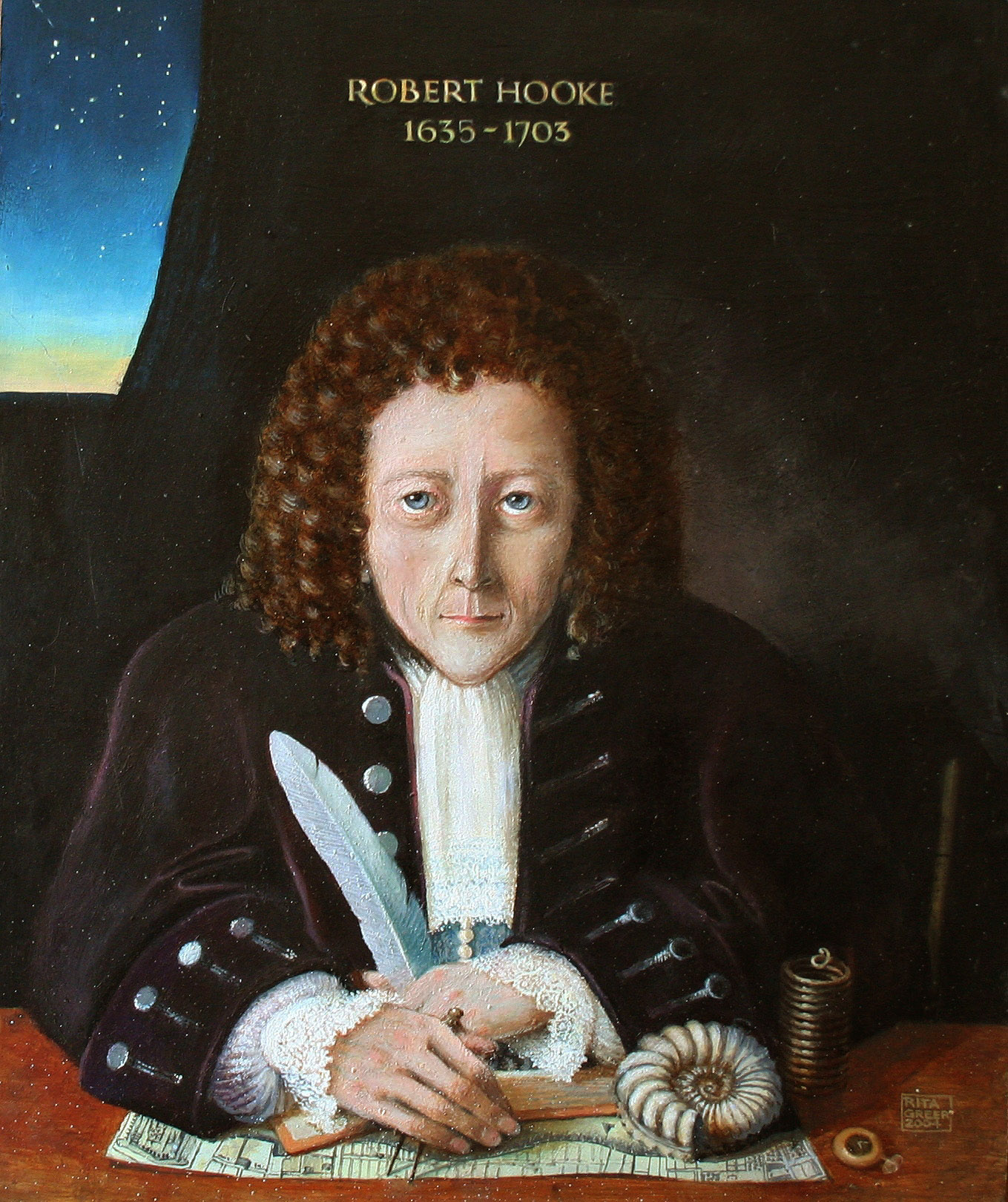
Robert Hooke

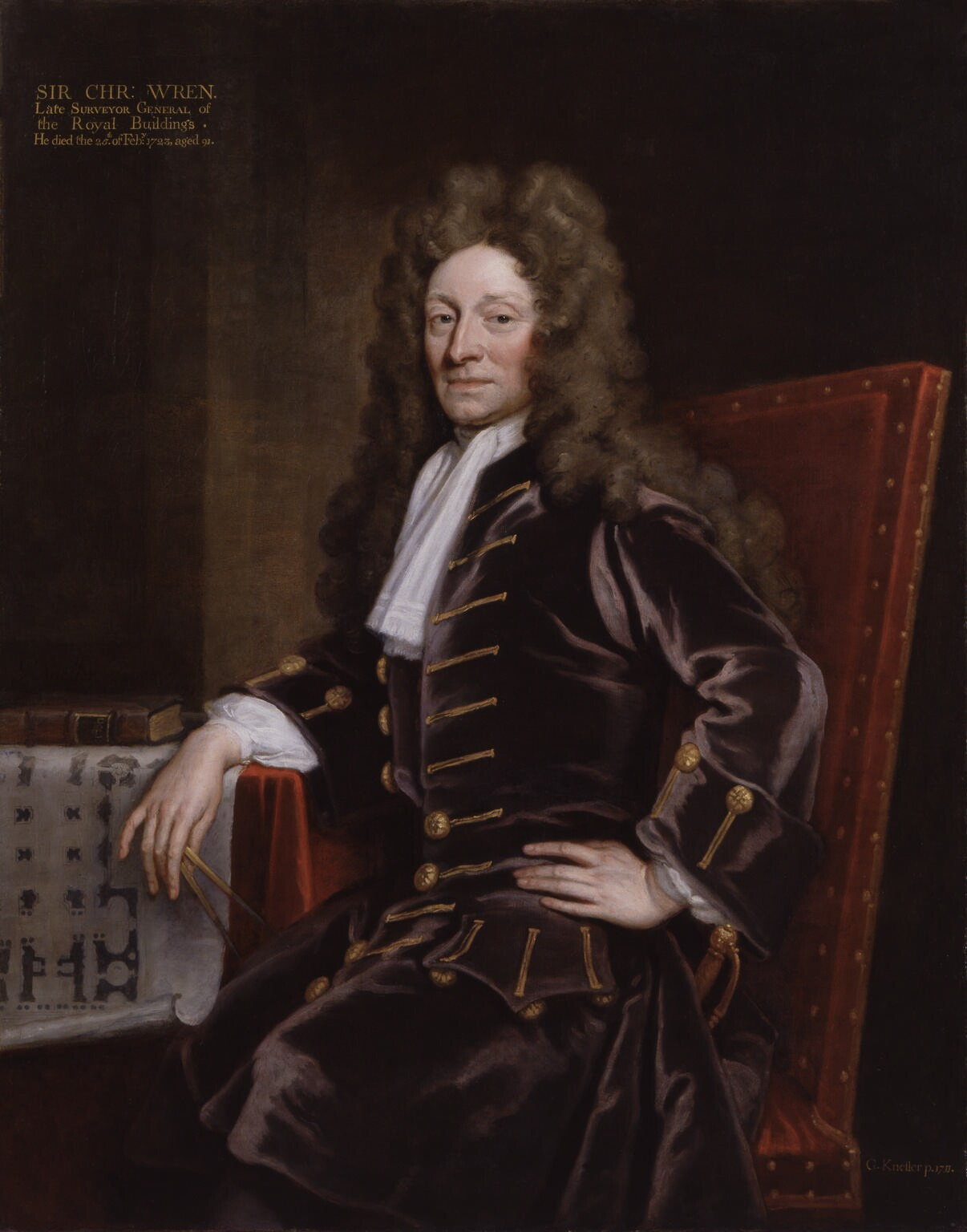
Christopher Wren

- Martin Aitken, archaeometrist
- Amir Attaran, epidemiologist
- Charles Badham, classics scholar
- Owen Barfield, philosopher, author, poet, and critic
- William Bayliss, physiologist
- Edward Spencer Beesly, historian and positivist
- Henry de Beltgens Gibbins, economic historian
- Richard Bentley, scholar and critic
- James Theodore Bent, explorer and archaeologist
- Bernard Bergonzi, literary scholar
- George Fielding Blandford, psychiatrist
- Nathan Bodington, first Vice-Chancellor of the University of Leeds
- Dietrich von Bothmer, art historian
- Harvie Branscomb, Chancellor of Vanderbilt University
- William Brown, Master of Darwin College, Cambridge
- Alan Bullock, historian of Nazi Germany
- Colin Campbell, geologist
- Allan Chapman, historian of science
- Oliver Carmichael, 3rd Chancellor of Vanderbilt University and 20th President of the University of Alabama
- Anthony Cheetham, materials scientist
- Robert Caesar Childers, Pali language scholar
- Pamela Clemit, literary critic
- Richard Congreve, philosopher and positivist
- Steven Connor, literary scholar
- Athelstan John Cornish-Bowden, biochemist
- Sedley Cudmore, economist and Chief Statistician of Canada
- Peter Day, inorganic chemist
- Emma Dench, classicist
- Frederick Augustus Dixey, entomologist
- Barrie Dobson, historian
- Nakdimon S. Doniach, lexicographer and linguist
- Edward Gordon Duff, bibliographer and librarian
- William Rickatson Dykes, botanist
- Marcus du Sautoy, mathematician
- Peter Edwards, historian
- Henry Emeleus, petrologist
- John Eveleigh, Provost of Oriel College, Oxford
- George Stanley Farnell, classist
- Roderick Floud, economic historian
- E.B. Ford, ecological geneticist
- Sandra Fredman, Professor of Law
- David B. Frohnmayer, President of the University of Oregon and politician
- Philip A. Gale, chemist
- Ian Grant, physicist
- Harry George Grey, theologian and Principal of Wycliffe Hall, Oxford
- Thomas Guidott, physician
- Jeffrey Hackney, legal scholar
- Edith Hall, classics scholar
- Avraham Harman, diplomat and President of the Hebrew University of Jerusalem
- James Harris, legal scholar, Professor of the London School of Economics and Fellow of the British Academy
- James Harris, grammarian
- Robert Hooke, architect, natural philosopher, scientist, polymath, co-founder of the Royal Society
- Sir Thomas Graham Jackson, architect
- Ian Grant, physicist
- Ivor Grattan-Guinness, historian of mathematics
- Jennifer Ingleheart, classicist
- Gilbert Ironside the younger, Bishop of Hereford and Warden of Wadham
- James Jago, physician
- Frank Jevons, Vice-Chancellor of Durham University
- Benjamin Kennicott, Hebrew scholar
- Richard S. Lambert, biographer and broadcaster
- John Leslie, philosopher
- David MacDonald, biologist and conservationist
- Ruth Mace, evolutionary anthropologist
- Sally Mapstone, Principal of the University of St Andrews
- P. J. Marshall, historian of the British empire in the 18th century
- John Mayow, chemist, physician, and physiologist
- Alister McGrath, Christian apologist and theologian
- Frank McLynn, historian and biographer
- Nevil Story Maskelyne, geologist and politician
- Leslie Mitchell, historian
- Charles Morton, educator
- Peter Nailor, civil servant, intellectual and professor
- William Neile, mathematician
- Farhan Nizami, scholar in Islamic studies
- Phoebe Okowa, Member, International Law Commission, 2023-
- Tony Orchard, inorganic chemist
- John Parsons, Master of Balliol College, Oxford and Bishop of Peterborough
- William Plenderleath, antiquarian
- Josephine Crawley Quinn, ancient historian and archaeologist
- Barnaby Raine, intellectual historian and political commentator
- P. J. Rhodes, ancient historian
- Stuart J. Russell, computer scientist
- Phillipp Schofield, historian
- Henry Albert Schultens, linguist
- Walter Shirley, priest and historian
- Tom Solomon, neurologist
- Thomas Sprat, divine and co-founder of the Royal Society
- Benjamin Parsons Symons, Warden of Wadham
- Richard W. Tsien, electric engineer and neurobiologist
- Wilson Dallam Wallis, anthropologist
- Ethelbert Dudley Warfield, historian and academic administrator
- Rex Warner, classicist, writer and translator
- William Whyte, historian
- Donald Wiseman, biblical scholar and Assyriologist
- Sir Christopher Wren, architect and co-founder of the Royal Society

=== Authors, artists, broadcasters and entertainers ===
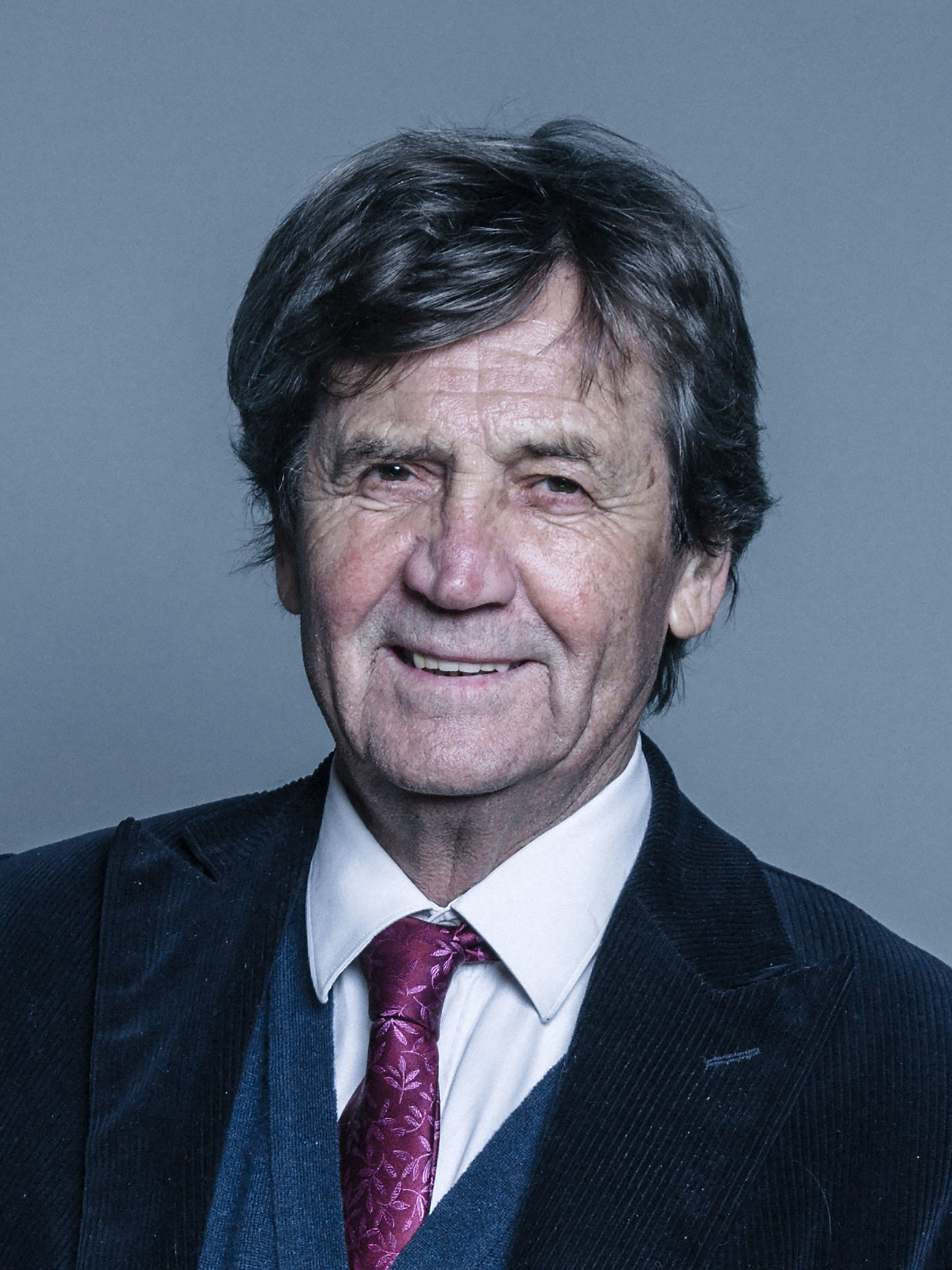
Melvyn Bragg

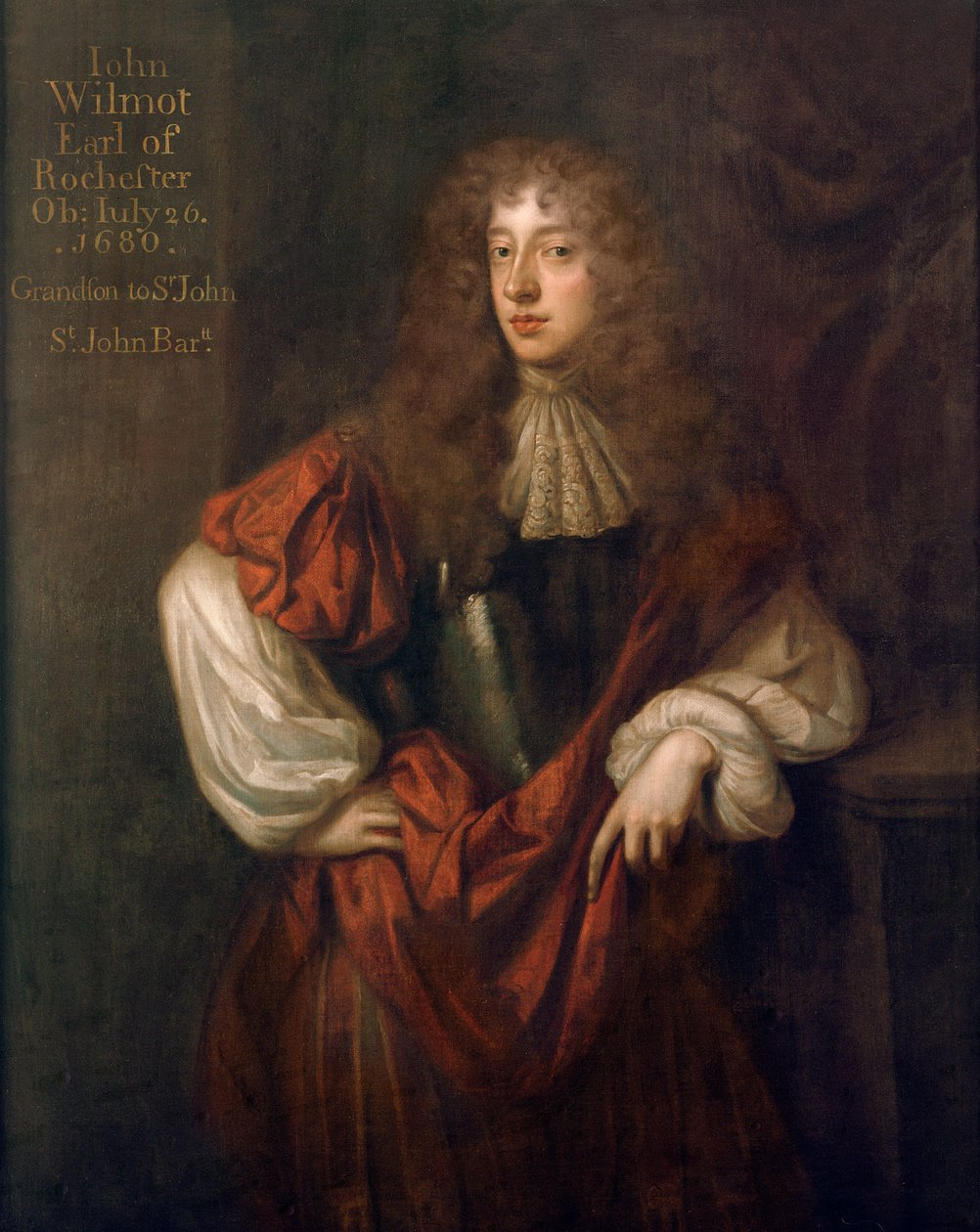
John Wilmot, 2nd Earl of Rochester

- Diran Adebayo, novelist
- Monica Ali, novelist
- Hossein Amini, film director and screenplay writer
- Lindsay Anderson, film director
- Timothy Bateson, actor
- Sir Thomas Beecham, conductor
- Melvyn Bragg, television broadcaster and writer
- Simon Brett, writer
- Jess Cartner-Morley, fashion editor of The Guardian newspaper
- Alan Connor, journalist and television presenter
- David Constantine, poet and translator
- Alan Coren, comic writer
- Robert Crampton, Times journalist
- Hilary Davies, poet, critic and translator
- Cecil Day-Lewis, former Poet Laureate
- Sophie Duker, stand-up comedian and writer
- James Flint, writer
- Isabel Fonseca, writer
- Neil Forrester, artist and cast member of The Real World TV show (London series)
- Tim Franks, journalist
- Jonathan Freedland, journalist
- Peter Gammond, music critic
- Amelia Gentleman, journalist
- Nordahl Grieg, Norwegian poet and playwright
- John Gross, author and literary critic
- Tom Gross, journalist and political commentator
- Francis Wrigley Hirst, journalist
- Montague Haltrecht, writer and literary critic
- Tom Holt, author of humorous and military fantasies, and of historical fiction
- Evan Jones, Jamaican screenwriter and poet
- Felicity Jones, actress
- Reginald Victor Jones, physicist, scientific military intelligence expert and writer
- Michael Kenyon, novelist
- Hari Kunzru, novelist
- Tim McInnerny, actor and comedian
- Patrick Marber, comedian and playwright
- Sharon Mascall, journalist, broadcaster and writer
- Jodhi May, actress
- Anne McElvoy, journalist and broadcaster
- Robert McGill, writer and literary critic
- Hilary Menos, poet
- Roger Mosey, BBC executive, Director of London 2012 Olympic Games coverage
- Neil Nightingale, director the BBC Natural History Unit from 2003 to 2009
- David Patrikarakos, author and journalist
- Iain Pears, novelist
- Laurie Penny, author and social activist
- Rosamund Pike, actress
- William Rayner, novelist
- Tony Richardson, English theatre and Academy Award-winning film director and producer
- Stevan Riley, film director
- Jude Rogers, judge
- Michael Rosen, poet and broadcaster
- Joshua Rozenberg, legal commentator and journalist
- Carr Scrope, versifier
- Peter Sculthorpe, composer
- Sir Charles Sedley, 5th Baronet, wit, dramatist and politician
- Fatemeh Shams, Award-winning poet and professor of Persian literature at University of Pennsylvania
- Mary Ann Sieghart, former assistant editor of The Times
- Leonard Strong, novelist, critic, historian and poet
- Paul Vaughan, journalist
- William Walsh, poet and critic
- Irving Wardle, theatre critic
- John Wilmot, 2nd Earl of Rochester, libertine poet and protégé of King Charles II
- Humbert Wolfe, poet

=== Clergy ===
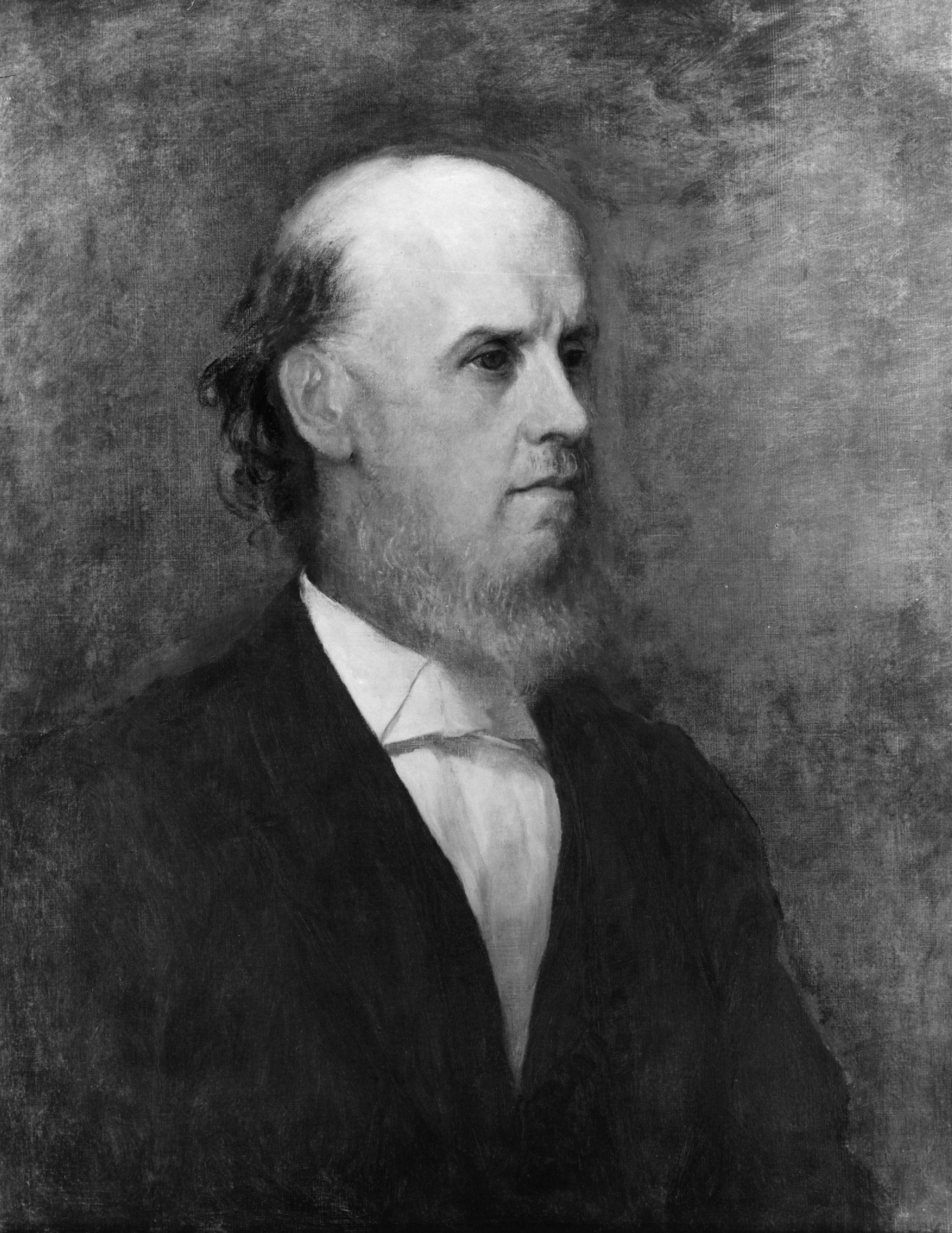
Samuel Barnett

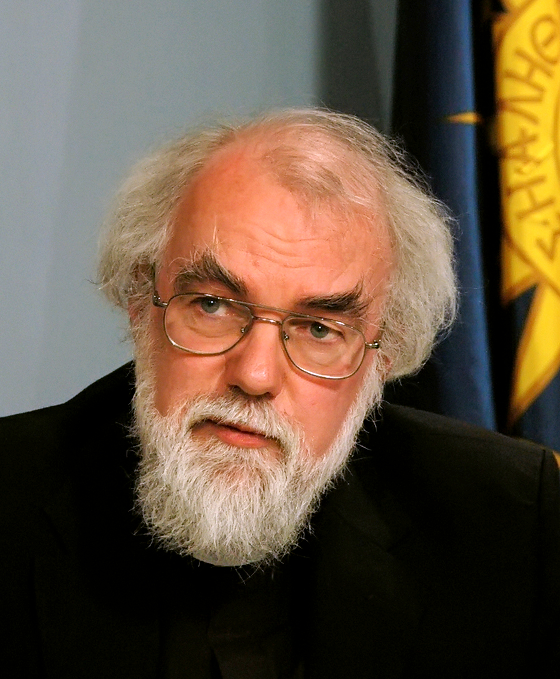
Rowan Williams

- Peter Allan, monk and Principal of College of the Resurrection
- Francis Bampfield, non-conformist minister
- Samuel Barnett, social reformer and Canon of Westminster Abbey
- Edward Bidwell, Bishop of Ontario
- Henry Bowlby, Bishop of Coventry
- Cornelius Burges, minister
- Richard William Church, churchman and writer
- John Erskine Clarke, clergyman
- Thomas Crofts, clergyman
- Cecil de Carteret, Bishop of Jamaica
- Robert Deakin, clergyman
- Joseph Diggle, clergyman, politician and public servant
- Edward Eddrup, clergyman and principal of Salisbury Theological College
- Edward Feild, clergyman
- Giles Fraser, Canon Chancellor of St Paul's Cathedral
- Campbell Hone, Bishop of Wakefield
- Walsham How, clergyman and botanist
- William Henry Jackson, priest, missionary and inventor of Burmese Braille
- Francis Jayne, clergyman
- Hewlett Johnson, clergyman, "Red Dean of Canterbury"
- Francis Kilvert, clergyman and diarist
- Alexander Mackonochie, mission priest
- Thomas Manton, clergyman
- Edward Garrard Marsh, poet and clergyman
- John Medley, first Bishop of Fredericton
- Wilfrid Oldaker, schoolmaster and Precentor of Christ Church, Oxford
- Reginald Owen, Primate of New Zealand
- Samuel Parker, clergyman
- Charles Ranken, clergyman and chess master
- William Jenkins Rees, clergyman and antiquary
- William Skinner, bishop of Aberdeen
- Edward Stone, clergyman and natural philosopher
- Rowan Williams, former Archbishop of Canterbury
- Richard Willis, Bishop
- Richard Woodward, Bishop Cloyne
- Foster Barham Zincke, clergyman, traveller, and antiquary

=== Politicians and civil servants ===
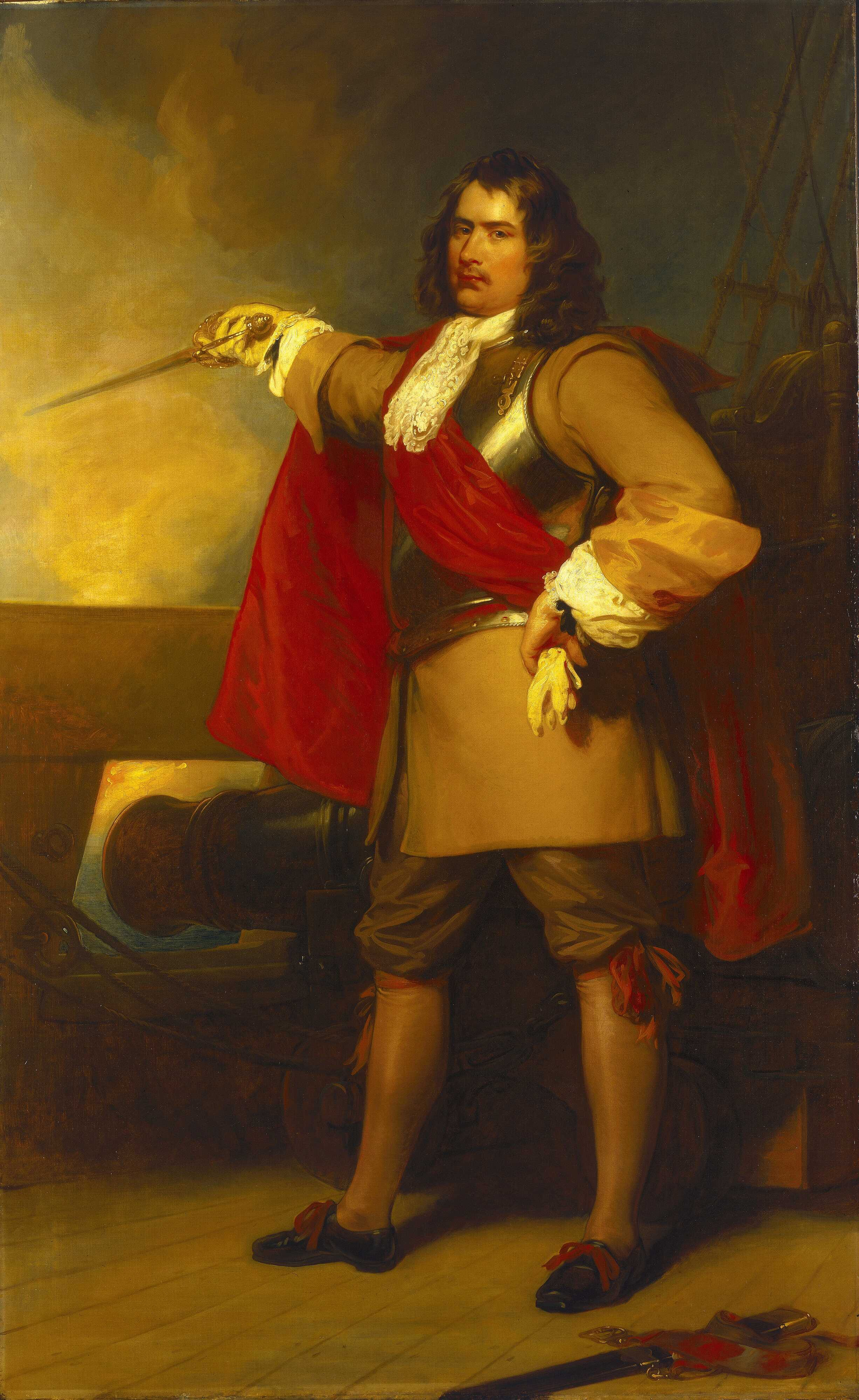
Robert Blake

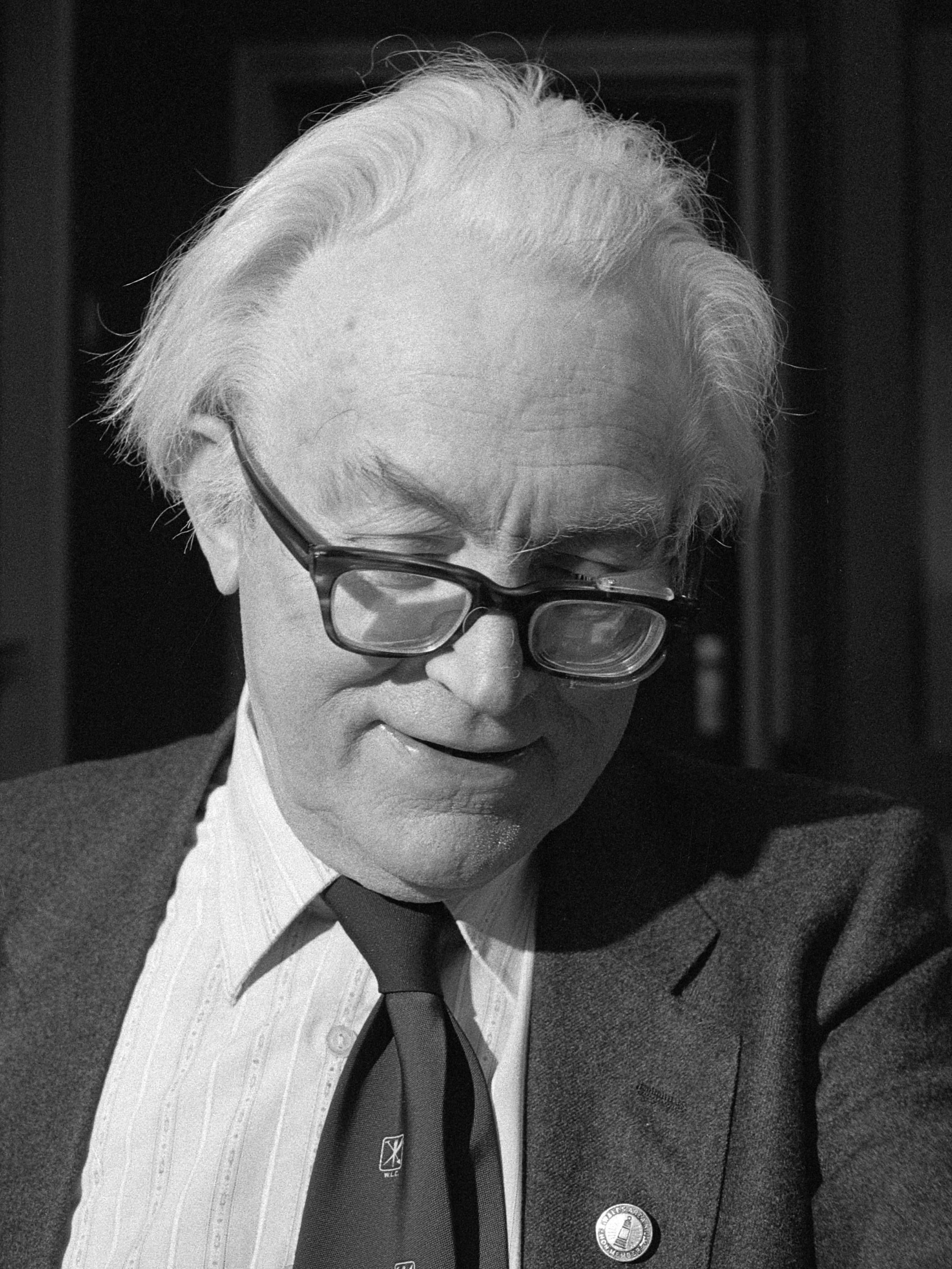
Michael Foot

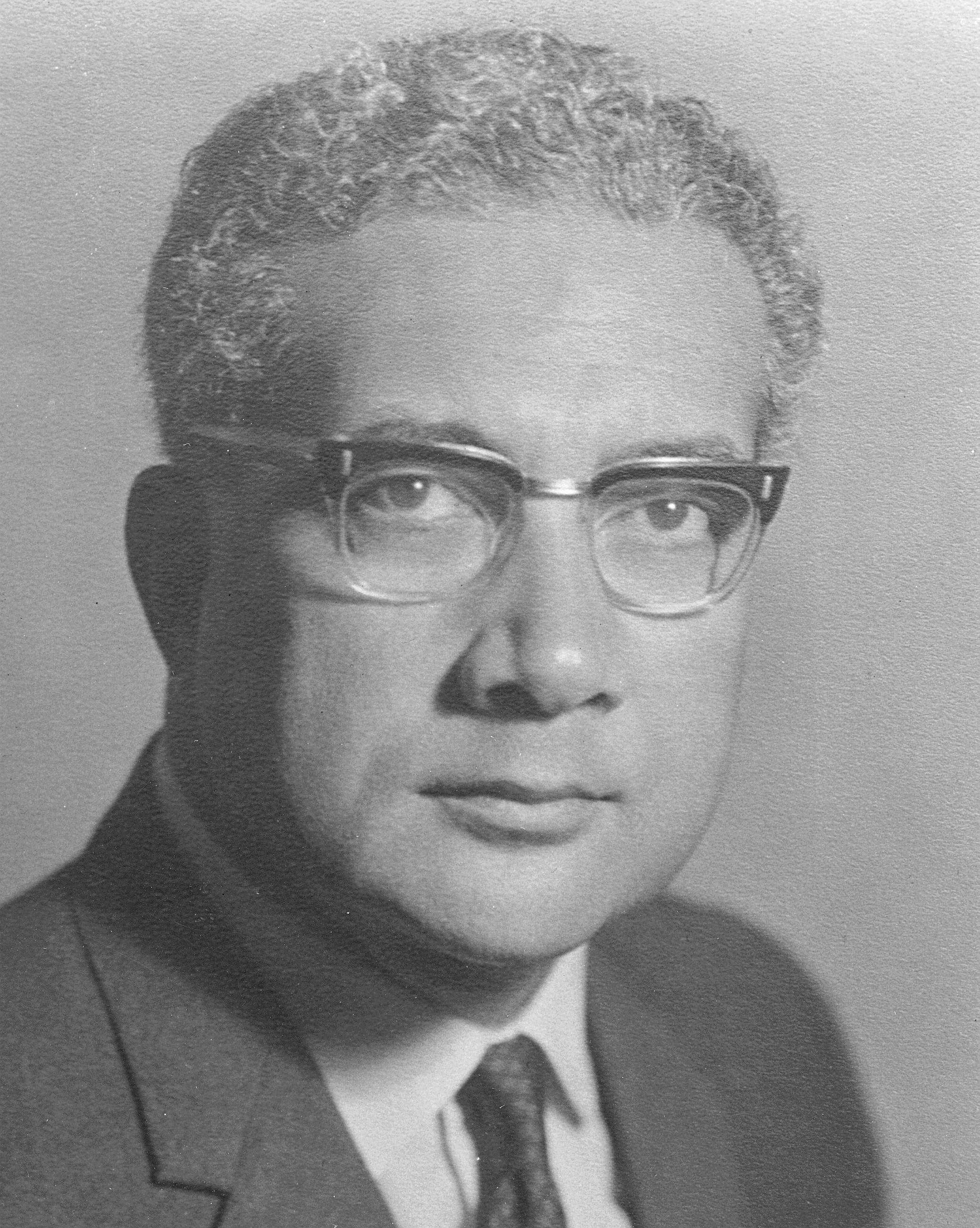
Kamisese Mara

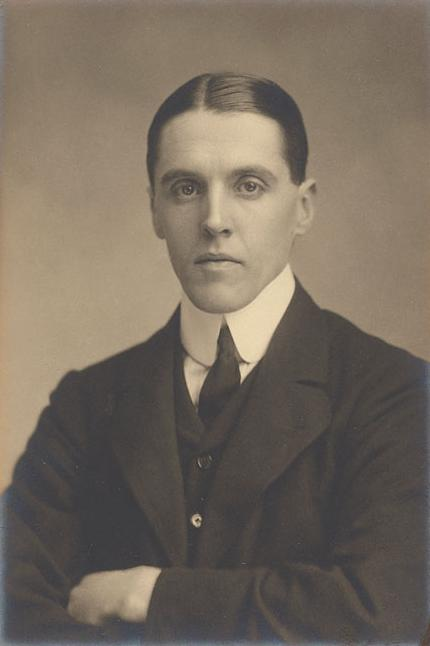
F. E. Smith, 1st Earl of Birkenhead

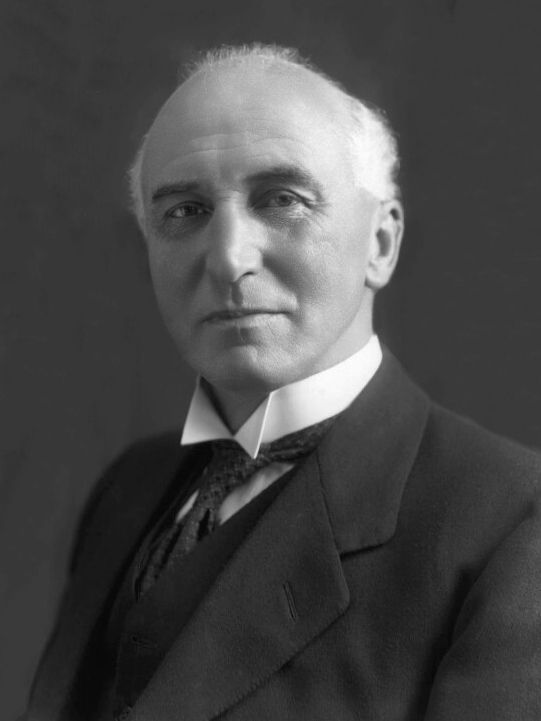
John Simon, 1st Viscount Simon

- Tom Allen, US Representative from Maine
- William Shepherd Allen, UK and New Zealand politician
- Michael Alison, politician
- Anita Anand, Canadian politician and Minister of Public Services and Procurement
- Edward Ashe, English politician and Father of the House
- Michael Bates, Baron Bates, politician
- Thomas Charles Baring, politician
- Richard Barnett, politician
- Richard Bethell, 1st Baron Westbury, former Lord Chancellor
- Marco Biagi, Scottish National Party politician
- Robert Blake, Cromwell's admiral
- David Blatherwick, diplomat
- John Bluett, politician
- John Bramston the Younger, politician
- Norman Brook, 1st Baron Normanbrook, civil servant, Cabinet Secretary 1947-1962
- William Burge, Attorney General of Jamaica and anti-abolitionist
- Edward Cakobau, Deputy Prime Minister of Fiji
- Hugh Childers, statesman
- Charles Delacourt-Smith, Baron Delacourt-Smith, politician
- H. R. P. Dickson, colonial political officer and author
- Joseph Diggle, clergyman and politician
- John Dyson, Lord Dyson, judge and Master of the Rolls
- Derek Enright, politician
- Vincent Evans, Judge on the European Court of Human Rights
- Charles Fane, 1st Viscount Fane, politician
- Steven Fisher, diplomat
- Bernard Floud, politician
- Peter Floud, civil servant
- Michael Foot, politician
- William Fox, premier of New Zealand
- Sydney Giffard, diplomat
- Penaia Ganilau, former Governor General and President of Fiji
- Badlishah of Kedah, Sultan of Kedah
- Eileen E. Gillese, judge
- Neil Gerrard, politician
- Ben Greene, Labour, and later far-right, politician
- Tuanku Abdul Halim, Sultan of Kedah, The King of Malaysia
- Robert Hannigan, cryptographer and civil servant
- John Hanson, diplomat
- Joseph Hardcastle, politician
- John Hardres, politician
- Avraham Harman, Israeli diplomat
- Evan Harris, former Liberal Democrat MP for Oxford West and Abingdon
- George Harrison, politician
- Charles Hodson, Baron Hodson, judge
- Marc Holland, Administrator of Ascension Island
- Sir Edmund Isham, 6th Baronet, politician
- Wyndham Knatchbull-Wyndham, politician
- Thomas Lewis, politician
- Richard Lloyd, royalist
- Mark Logan, MP for Bolton North East
- John Lovelace, 3rd Baron Lovelace, Whig politician
- Eric Macfadyen, politician
- Kenneth Maddocks, former Governor and Commander-in-Chief of Fiji
- Kamisese Mara, former Prime Minister and President of Fiji
- Keir Mather, current 'Baby of the House' and Labour MP for Selby and Ainsty
- Duncan Menzies, Lord Menzies, judge of the Supreme Courts of Scotland
- Peter Milliken, Speaker of the House of Commons of Canada
- T. E. Moir, civil servant
- James Morris, Conservative MP for Halesowen and Rowley Regis
- Robert Moses, city planner
- James Munby, judge
- James Murray, politician
- Michael Nolan, Baron Nolan, judge, first chairman of the Committee on Standards in Public Life (1994–1997), Chancellor of the University of Essex (1997–2002)
- Feroz Khan Noon, Prime Minister of Pakistan
- Arthur Onslow, former Speaker of the House of Commons
- William Palmes, politician
- Gopalaswami Parthasarathy, Indian diplomat and journalist
- Edward Phelips, politician
- Carew Raleigh, politician
- Emma Reynolds, MP for Wolverhampton North East
- Colin Thornton-Kemsley, National Liberal politician
- Sir Thomas Rich, 1st Baronet, politician
- Denys Roberts, Chief Justice of the Supreme Court of Hong Kong
- Adair Roche, Baron Roche, law lord
- Sir William Russell, 1st Baronet, of Wytley, politician
- Philip Rycroft, civil servant
- Wasim Sajjad, two-time interim President of Pakistan and former Chairman Senate
- John C. Sherburne, Vermont politician
- John Simon, 1st Viscount Simon, former Lord Chancellor
- F. E. Smith, 1st Earl of Birkenhead, former Lord Chancellor
- Simon Smith, diplomat
- Thomas Strangways, Father of the House
- Lala Sukuna, Fijian chief
- Randolph Vigne, South African anti-apartheid activist
- K. N. Wanchoo, Chief Justice of India
- Eugene Wason, Scottish politician
- Geoffrey Whiskard, diplomat
- Daryl Williams, Attorney-General for Australia
- Henry Penruddocke Wyndham, politician, topographer and author
- Hugh Wyndham, judge
- Thomas Wyndham (of Witham Friary), politician
- Thomas Wyndham, 1st Baron Wyndham, Irish lawyer and politician, former Lord Chancellor of Ireland
- Sir Wadham Wyndham, judge
- Sir Peter William Youens, former Deputy Chief Secretary of Nyasaland (today Malawi) and secretary to the Prime Minister and the Cabinet of Malawi

=== Other ===
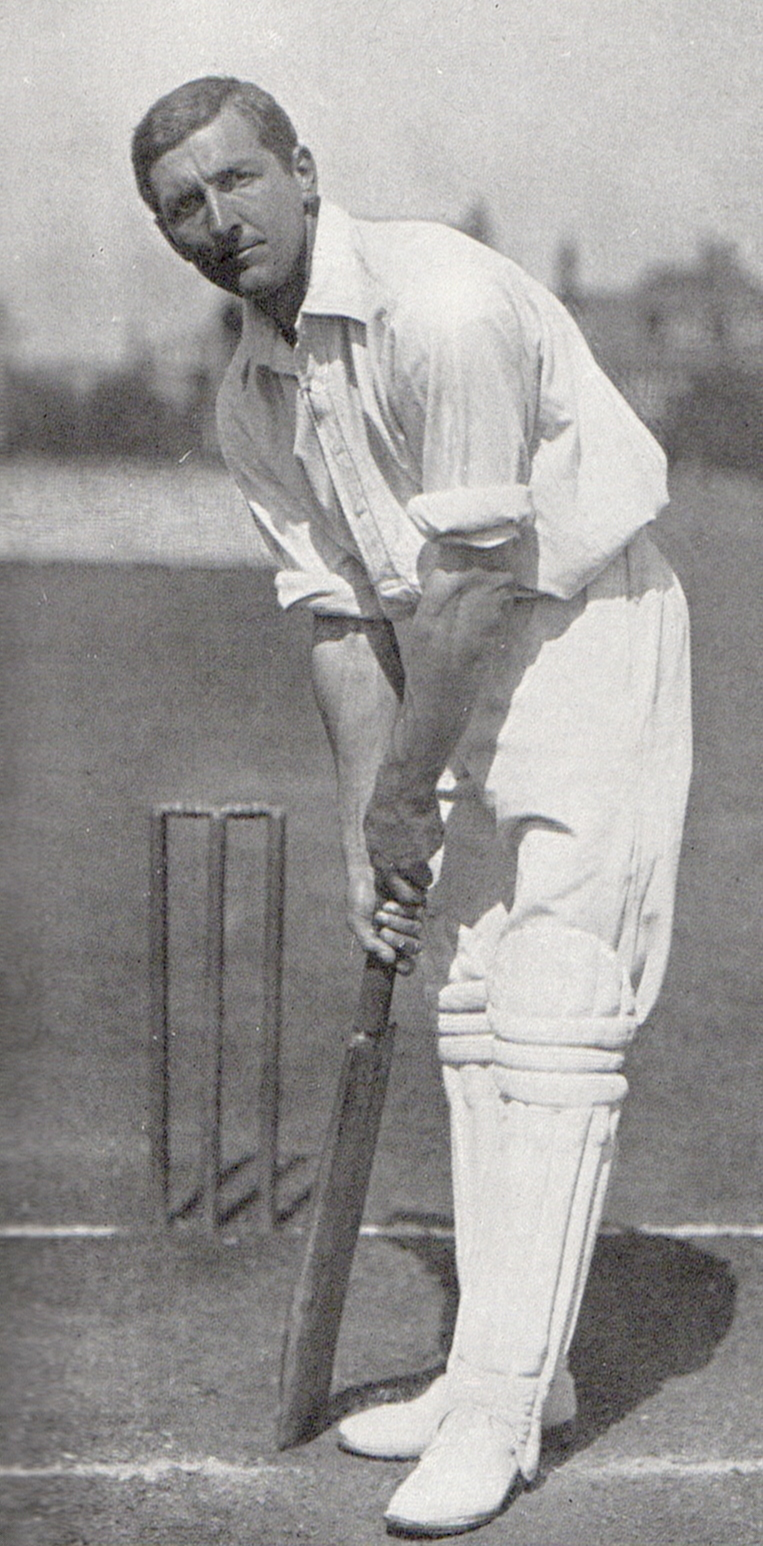
C. B. Fry

- Noel Agazarian, World War II fighter ace
- Simon Anholt, political scientist, policy advisor
- E. W. Bastard, cricketer
- Arthur Berry, footballer
- Alan Blackshaw, mountaineer, skier and civil servant
- William Bromet, rugby player
- Brian Burnett, Royal Air Force and Commander-in-Chief of British Far East Command
- Sir Michael Checkland, former Director-General of the BBC
- John Cooke, prosecutor of Charles I
- Warren East, businessman, chief executive of ARM Holdings plc
- William Freke, mystic
- C. B. Fry, sportsman
- George Hogg, adventurer
- George Hastings, 8th Earl of Huntingdon, nobleman
- Richard Koch, management consultant
- David Levin, entrepreneur
- Emily Ludolf, amateur chef, finalist on BBC 2's Masterchef, 2008
- John MacBain, businessman
- Paul McMahon, cricketer
- Algernon Methuen, publisher
- Herbert Page, cricketer
- Nathaniel Rothschild, 5th Baron Rothschild, British financier and only son of Jacob Rothschild, 4th Baron Rothschild
- Edward Saatchi, entrepreneur
- Chris Saunders, cricketer and headmaster
- Steven Skala, banker
- Dr Richard Stone OBE, social campaigner, philanthropist, anti-racism and interfaith activist

== Fellows and honorary Fellows ==
- Alfred Ayer, logical positivist
- Michael R. Ayers, philosopher
- John Bamborough, scholar of English literature and founding Principal of Linacre College, Oxford
- John Bell, Professor of Law and Fellow of Pembroke College, Cambridge
- T.J. Binyon, Russian literature scholar and crime writer
- Ian Brownlie, barrister and academic in international law
- Philip Bullock, Professor of Russian Literature and Music
- Peter Carter, legal scholar
- Allan Chapman, historian of science
- Richard Congreve, philosopher
- Charles Coulson, applied mathematician, theoretical chemist and religious author
- Peter Derow, historian of ancient Greece and Rome
- Frederick Augustus Dixey, former President of the Royal Entomological Society of London
- Terry Eagleton, Marxist literary theorist
- Eprime Eshag, Keynesian economist
- Jeffrey Hackney, legal scholar
- Andrew Hodges, mathematician, author and Dean of Wadham College
- Humphrey Hody, clergyman and theologian
- Thomas Graham Jackson, architect
- Frederick Lindemann, 1st Viscount Cherwell, Churchill's scientific adviser during the Second World War
- Nicholas Lloyd, cleric and lexicographer
- David Mabberley, botanist, educator and writer
- Edward Arthur Milne, astrophysicist and mathematician
- Ted Nelson, American sociologist, philosopher, and pioneer of information technology
- Bernard O'Donoghue, Irish poet
- Roger Penrose, mathematical physicist and philosopher
- Benjamin Bickley Rogers, classical scholar
- Richard Sharpe, historian of medieval England, Ireland, Scotland and Wales
- Marcus du Sautoy, mathematician, writer, television presenter
- Edward Stone, Rector who discovered the active ingredient of Aspirin
- John Swinton, writer, academic, Church of England clergyman and orientalist
- Joseph Trapp, clergyman, academic, poet and pamphleteer
- Theodore Wade-Gery, classical scholar, historian and epigrapher
- Joseph White, orientalist and theologian
- John Williams, Welsh lawyer and writer
- R. J. P. (Bob) Williams, inorganic chemist
- Robert J.C. Young, post-colonial theorist, cultural critic, and historian

=== Honorary Fellows ===
- Abdul Halim of Kedah, Sultan of Kedah
- Syed Refaat Ahmed, chief justice of Bangladesh
- Monica Ali, writer
- Anita Anand, Canadian lawyer and politician
- Sir Franklin Berman, barrister, judge and arbitrator
- Melvyn Bragg, Baron Bragg, television broadcaster
- Sir Brian Burnett, Air Chief Marshal
- Sir Neil Chalmers, zoologist and former Warden of Wadham
- Sir Michael Checkland, former Director-General of the BBC
- Peter Day, inorganic chemist
- John Dyson, Lord Dyson, Master of the Rolls
- Sir Warren East, businessman
- Sir Roderick Floud, economic historian
- Flora Fraser, writer
- Sandra Fredman, academic lawyer
- Sir Sydney Giffard, diplomat and author
- Alexandra Bech Gjørv, Norwegian businesswoman
- Paul Goodwin, curator
- Allan Gotlieb, Canadian public servant and author
- Robert Hannigan, former director of GCHQ
- Allen Hill, bioinorganic chemist
- Sir Timothy Holroyde, judge
- Jeremy R. Knowles, former professor of chemistry at Harvard University
- Hari Kunzru, novelist and journalist
- Lucy Lake, female educationist
- Lee Shau-kee, businessman
- Jörn Leonhard, historian
- Ken Macdonald, Baron Macdonald of River Glaven, lawyer and politician, former warden of Wadham
- David Malcolm, lawyer
- Dame Sally Mapstone, principal of the University of St Andrews
- P. J. Marshall, historian of the British Empire
- Nevil Story Maskelyne, geologist and politician
- Peter Milliken, lawyer and politician
- Claus Moser, Baron Moser, statistician and public servant
- Roger Mosey, author and broadcaster, former master of Selwyn College, Cambridge
- Sir James Munby, judge
- Michael Nolan, Baron Nolan, judge, first chairman of the Committee on Standards in Public Life (1994–1997), Chancellor of the University of Essex (1997–2002)
- Ashraf Pahlavi, Princess of Iran
- Rosamund Pike, actress
- Josephine Crawley Quinn, historian and archaeologist
- Sir Denys Roberts, former British colonial official and judge
- Sir Christopher Rose, former judge
- Michael Rosen, author, broadcaster and poet
- John-Arne Røttingen, Norwegian medical scientist
- Wasim Sajjad, Pakistani lawyer and legal educator
- Sir David Smith, botanist
- Simon Smith, diplomat
- Kathleen Sullivan, lawyer
- Rowan Williams, Baron Williams of Oystermouth, former Archbishop of Canterbury
- Robert J. C. Young, philosopher and historian

== Wardens ==
The Warden is the college's principal, responsible for its academic leadership, chairing its governing body, and representing it in the outside world. Below is a list of the Wardens of Wadham college in chronological order. Their time in office is given in parentheses.

- Robert Wright (20 April-20 July 1613), Bishop of Bristol and Bishop of Lichfield
- John Fleming (1613–1617)
- William Smyth (1617–1635)
- Daniel Estcot (1635–1644)
- John Pitt (1644–1648)
- John Wilkins (1648–1659), Bishop, scholar and co-founder of the Royal Society
- Walter Blandford (1659–1665), Bishop of Oxford, 1665, Bishop of Worcester, 1671
- Gilbert Ironside the younger (1665–1689), Bishop of Bristol, 1689, Bishop of Hereford, 1691
- Thomas Dunster (1689–1719)
- William Baker (1719–1724), Bishop of Bangor, 1724, Bishop of Norwich, 1727
- Robert Thistlethwayte (1724–1739), clergyman, fled to France in 1737 after a homosexual scandal
- Samuel Lisle (1739–1744), Bishop of St. Asaph, 1744, Bishop of Norwich, 1748
- George Wyndham (1744–1777)
- James Gerard (1777–1783)
- John Wills (1783–1806), administrator, Vice-Chancellor of Oxford University (1792–1796)
- William Tournay (1806–1831)
- Benjamin Parsons Symons (1831–1871), Vice-Chancellor of Oxford University (1844–1848)
- John Griffiths (1871–1881), Keeper of the Archives (1857–1885)
- George E. Thorley (1881–1903)
- Patrick A. Wright-Henderson (1903–1913)
- Joseph Wells (1913–1927), Vice-Chancellor of Oxford University (1923–1926)
- John F. Stenning (1927–1938)
- Maurice Bowra (1938–1970), classical scholar and academic, known for his wit
- Stuart Hampshire (1970–1984), philosopher and literary critic
- Claus Moser, Baron Moser (1984–1993), statistician and civil servant
- John Flemming (1993–2004), economist, Pro-Vice-Chancellor of Oxford University, Fellow of the British Academy
- Neil Chalmers (2004–2012), former Director of the Natural History Museum
- Ken Macdonald, Baron Macdonald of River Glaven (2012–2021), former Director of Public Prosecutions of England and Wales (2003–2008)
- Robert Hannigan (2021–present)

== Deans ==
Responsible for various aspects of the day-to-day student life of the College, the Dean has authority in matters of discipline concerning the behaviour of individuals or groups. Below is a list of the Deans of Wadham college in chronological order, together with their time in office.

- John Pitt 1613, 1616–17
- John Goodridge 1613, 1618
- Matthew Osborne 1614, 1619
- Daniel Estcot 1615, Warden 1635–1644
- Ralph Flexney 1620
- Alexander Huish 1621
- Ignatius Jordan 1622
- Amias Hext 1622–23
- William Boswell 1624, 1626
- Francis Strode 1625
- Gilbert Drake 1627–28
- William Turner 1629–31
- John Warren 1632–33
- Tristram Sugge 1635, 1636
- Leonard Simons 1637, 1644–1645, 1647
- Robert Chapline 1638–39
- Richard Goodridge 1641
- George Ashwell 1642–43
- Richard Knightbridge 1646, resigned 1647 and replaced by Leonard Simons
- Anthony Nourse 1647
- Samuel Lee 1653
- John Ball 1659, died 1660 and replaced by William Turges
- Walter Pope 1660
- Daniel Estcott 1661
- Thomas Jeamson 1662, 1667
- John Chase 1663, 1671
- Brian Cave 1665, 1668
- Nathaniel Salter 1669
- William Thornton 1670
- George Fletcher 1672, 1676, died 1676 and replaced by William Shortgrave
- John Ludwell 1673–1674
- Thomas Lessey 1675
- Robert Pitt 1677
- Robert Balch 1678
- William Latton 1679
- William Gould 1681
- George Harding 1683, replaced by Thomas Lyndesay
- Thomas Pigott 1684
- Alexander Crooke 1685
- Thomas Lidgould 1686
- Thomas Dunster 1687
- Humphrey Hody 1688
- Robert Doyley 1689
- William Hunt 1719
- John Leaves 1720, 1725, 1727
- Robert Nash 1721
- George Bowditch 1722, 1726
- Philip Speke 1723–24
- Edwyn Sandys 1728
- Stopford Jacks c.1925
- John Frederick Stenning, Warden 1927–1938
- Maurice Bowra c.1922–1938, Warden 1938–70
- A. J. Ayer 1945, philosopher
- John Bamborough 1947–54, founding Principal of Linacre College, Oxford
- T.J. Binyon ?–1976 & 1980s, literary scholar and writer
- David Mabberley 1976–82 and 1991–96, botanist and writer
- James Morwood 2000–2006, Grocyn Lecturer in Classics
- Andrew Hodges 2011–2014, mathematician and writer
- Martin Bureau, 2014–2016, Lindemann Fellow and Tutor in Physics, astrophysicist
- Claudia Pazos Alonso, 2016–2019, Fellow and Tutor in Portuguese
- Andrew D Farmery 2019–2022, Sir Samuel Scott of Yews Fellow and Tutor in Medicine; Professor of Anaesthetics
- Sarah J. Cullinan Herring 2022-2023, Hody Fellow and Tutor in Classics.
- Andrew D Farmery 2023-2025. Sir Samuel Scott of Yews Fellow and Tutor in Medicine; Professor of Anaesthetics
