= List of directors of the Natural History Museum =

The Director of the Natural History Museum is the senior manager of the Natural History Museum, London, which was split off from the British Museum in 1881. It should not be confused with the role of Director of Science, Natural History Museum. The following list gives the first Superintendent and then the Directors of the Natural History Museum, London.

== Superintendent of the Natural History Departments ==
- Sir Richard Owen (1881–1883)

== Directors of the Natural History Museum ==
- Sir William Henry Flower (1884–1898)
- Sir Ray Lankester (1898–1907)
- Sir Lazarus Fletcher (1909–1919)
- Sir Sidney Frederic Harmer (1919-1927)
- Charles Tate Regan (1927-1938)
- Sir Clive Forster-Cooper (1938–1947)
- Sir Norman Boyd Kinnear (1947-1950)
- Sir Gavin de Beer (1950–1960)
- Sir Terence Morrison-Scott (1960–1968)
- Sir Frank Claringbull (1968–1976)
- Ronald Henderson Hedley (1976–1988)
- Sir Neil Chalmers (1988–2004)
- Sir Michael Dixon (2004–2020)
- Doug Gurr (2020–present)
