= John Wills (academic administrator) =

English academic administrator

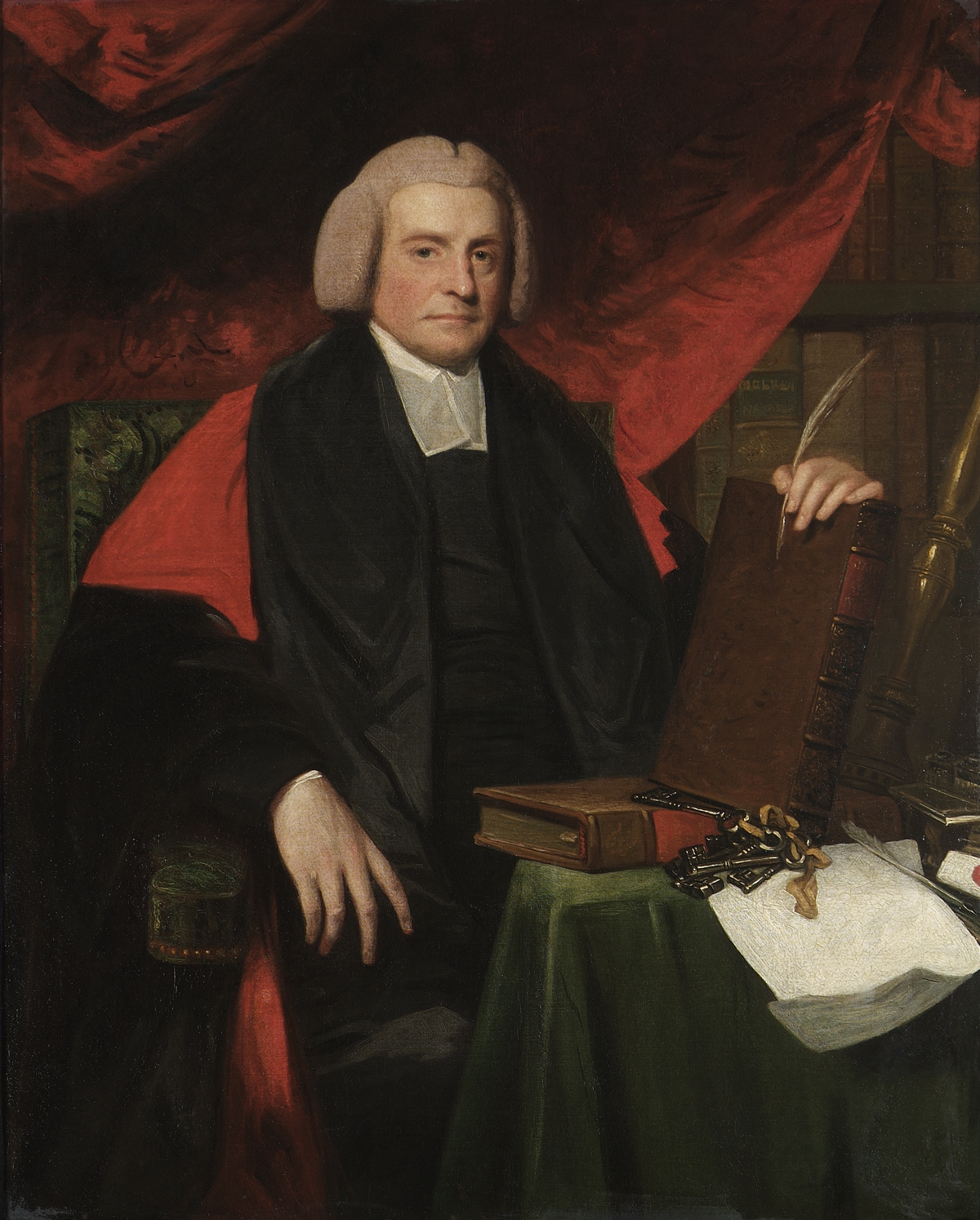
John Wills

John Wills (1741 – 16 June 1806) was an English academic administrator at the University of Oxford.

John Wills, the only son of John Wills, was born in Seaborough. He matriculated at Hertford College, Oxford in 1758, aged 17, graduating B.A. 1761, M.A. 1765, B.D. & D.D. 1783. He became a Fellow of Hertford College in 1765.

In the church, Wills was appointed rector of Tydd St Mary, Lincolnshire in 1778, and Seaborough in 1779.

Wills was elected Warden of Wadham College, Oxford on 7 July 1783, a post he held until his death in 1806. While Warden at Wadham College, Wills was also Vice-Chancellor of Oxford University from 1792 until 1796.

Wills was a significant benefactor to Wadham College.

Academic offices
Preceded by James Gerard	Warden of Wadham College, Oxford; 1783–1806	Succeeded by William Tournay
Preceded by John Cooke	Vice-Chancellor of Oxford University; 1792–1796	Succeeded by Scrope Berdmore
