= Filippo Ferrari =

Italian Servite friar and scholar (1551–1626)

Filippo Ferrari (Philippus Ferrarius) (1551 – 1626) was an Italian Servite friar and scholar, known as a geographer, and also noted as a hagiographer.

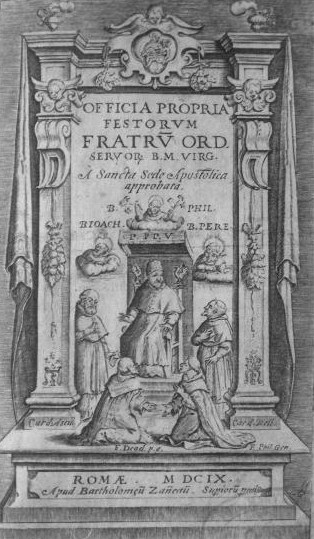
In this frontispiece from 1609, Filippo Ferrari is on the right, at the feet of Pope Paul V, in front of Roberto Bellarmine.

== Life ==
He was born at Oviglio in Piedmont. It is near Alessandria, and he was nicknamed Alessandrino (Philippus Ferrarius Alexandrinus). He taught mathematics for 48 years at the University of Pavia.

Ferrari was prior general of his order from 1604 to 1609, and vicar general in 1624/5. He was therefore head of the Servites at the time of the Venetian Interdict, and was consulted by Paolo Sarpi in Venice. A detailed account of Ferrari's dealings with Pope Paul V during the confrontation of those years was given by Fulgenzio Micanzio, Sarpi's ally. It was with Ferrari's approval that Sarpi took up the appointment as theological consultant to Venice on 28 January 1606.

== Works ==
Ferrari published his Epitome Geographicum in 1605. His Lexicon Geographicum was published internationally in a number of later editions: edited by William Dillingham (London, 1657), and by Michel Antoine Baudrand (Paris, 1670). It was used in the Dictionarium Historicum, (Oxford, 1670) of Nicholas Lloyd.

Other works included:

- Nova Topographia in Martyrologium Romanum (1609).
- Catalogus sanctorum Italiae in Menses duodecim distributus (1613).
- Catalogus generalis sanctorum (1625).
