= Benjamin Parsons Symons =

Benjamin Parsons Symons (28 January 1785 – 12 April 1878) was an academic administrator at the University of Oxford in England.

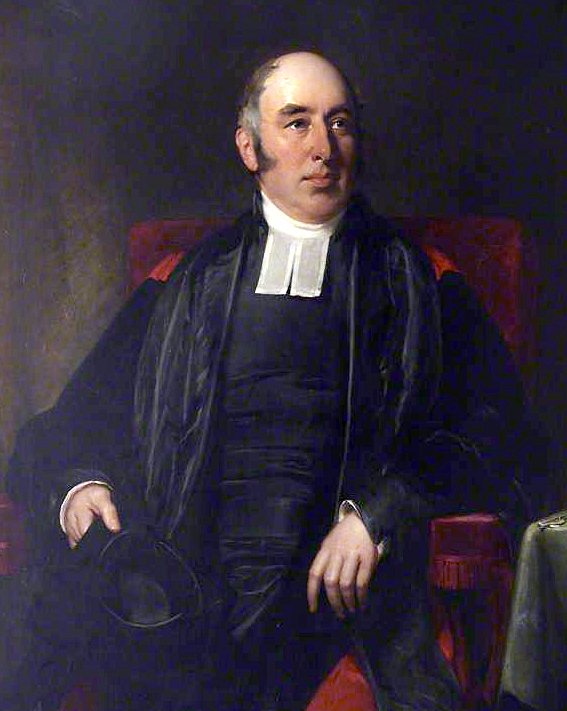
Benjamin Parsons Symons-(1785–1878), Fellow of Wadham College, Oxford, Vice-Chancellor of Oxford University.

== Life ==
Benjamin Symons was born in Cheddar, Somerset, the son of John Symons of Cheddar. He was educated at Sherborne School and matriculated at Wadham College, Oxford, on 2 February 1802, where he was admitted as a scholar on 25 October 1803. He graduated with a BA degree on 14 October 1805 and received an MA degree on 7 July 1810.

Symons was elected a Probationer Fellow at Wadham College on 30 June 1811 and was admitted as a Fellow on 2 July 1812. He graduated with a Bachelor of Divinity on 22 April 1819. He was bursar of the College from 1814 to 1823, after which he became sub-warden. On 23 January 1831 he obtained the degree of Doctor of Divinity and on 16 June of that year he was elected Warden of the College. He was Vice-Chancellor of Oxford University from 1844 to 1848. He resigned the wardenship on 18 October 1871, but continued to reside in Oxford until his death in 1878.

Symons did not follow the high-church Anglican Oxford Movement prevalent at Oxford, and was regarded as the leader of the evangelical wing in later life. He changed the time of dinner at Wadham to inconvenience any students wishing to attend Newman's sermons.

He was buried in the ante-chapel at Wadham College and bequeathed £1,000 to the College to establish an exhibition. His portrait was hung in the College hall.

Academic offices
Preceded by William Tournay	Warden of Wadham College, Oxford; 1831–1871	Succeeded by John Griffiths
Preceded by Philip Wynter	Vice-Chancellor of Oxford University; 1844–1848	Succeeded by Frederick Charles Plumptre
