= John Boreham =

British statistician (1925–1994)

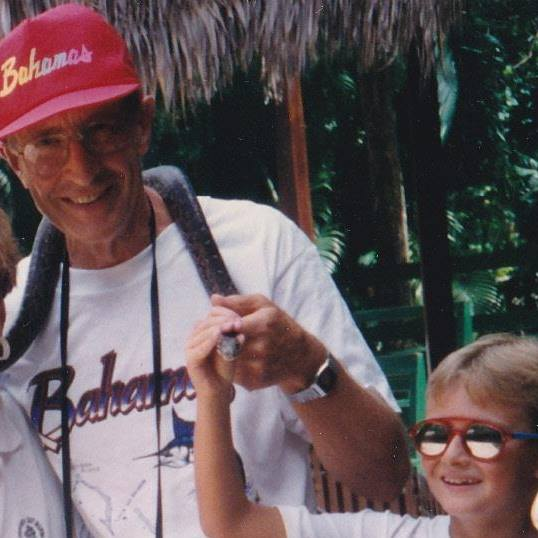
Sir John Boreham on holiday in 1992

Sir Arthur John Boreham, KCB (30 July 1925 – 8 June 1994) was a British government statistician and the director of what was the Central Statistical Office of the United Kingdom from 1978 to 1985. He was knighted in 1980.

== Background ==
The son of Frederick Boreham, Archdeacon of Cornwall from 1949 to 1965, Sir John Boreham was educated at Marlborough College and Trinity College, Oxford, where he studied for a philosophy, politics and economics degree with statistics as an optional subject.

== Career ==
After completing his degree, Sir John Boreham had a varied and successful career in the Government Statistical Service (GSS). He joined the Agriculture Economic Research Institute in Oxford and shortly afterward in 1950, joined the statistics division of the Ministry of Food as a higher executive officer. In 1951, he joined the Ministry of Agriculture as an assistant statistician and then in 1955, he moved to the General Register Office. He moved to the Central Statistical Office in 1958 and returned to the General Register Office on promotion to chief statistician in 1963. Between 1967 and 1971, he was director of economics and statistics at the Ministry of Technology. In 1972, he moved from the Ministry of Technology to the Central Statistical Office as an assistant director. A year later, he was promoted to deputy director. He became director of the Central Statistical Office and head of the Government Statistical Service on 1 August 1978.

== Director of the Central Statistical Office ==
A key event during the tenure of Sir John Boreham as director of the Central Statistical Office was the Rayner Review of the Central Statistical Office and the Government Statistical Service, which was an early part of a policy of a newly elected government to reduce the size of the Civil Service. As a result of this review, the budget of the Central Statistical Office was cut by 33% and manpower by 25%. By streamlining and compressing the work of the office, Boreham implemented most of the recommendations of the Rayner Review by mid-1981 while still providing the same service to government. After 35 years in the Government Statistical Service, he retired on 31 July 1985.

== International roles ==
One of the duties of the director of the Central Statistical Office was to attend the twice-yearly Conference of Directors General of the National Statistical Offices of the member countries of the European Community. One meeting each year was held in Luxembourg and the other was hosted in turn by the member countries. The United Kingdom hosted the Conference at Leeds Castle in spring 1983.

Boreham was also elected to serve as the chairman of the Conference of European Statisticians, one of the five regional commissions of the United Nations, in 1984 and 1985.

== Trusteeship ==
He was a trustee of the National Centre for Social Research(NatCen) from 1984 to his death in 1994.

== Honours ==
Boreham was appointed a Companion of the Order of the Bath (CB) in the 1974 New Year Honours, and promoted to Knight Commander of the Order (KCB) in the 1980 Birthday Honours.

== Legacy ==
The Sir John Boreham Archive is housed at the British Library. The papers can be accessed through the British Library catalogue.

== Bibliography ==
- Erritt, J. "Obituary: Sir John Boreham, KCB, 1925–94." Journal of the Royal Statistical Society. Series A (Statistics in Society), Vol. 158, No. 1 (1995), pp. 182–184.
- Hoinville, G & Smith T. M. F. "The Rayner Review of Government Statistical Services." Journal of the Royal Statistical Society. Series A (General), Vol. 145, No. 2 (1982), pp. 195–207.

Government offices
Preceded by Claus Moser (now Lord Moser)	Director of the Central Statistical Office, UK; 1978–1985	Succeeded by Jack Hibbert
