= Frederick Charles Plumptre =

British Victorian academic (1796–1870)

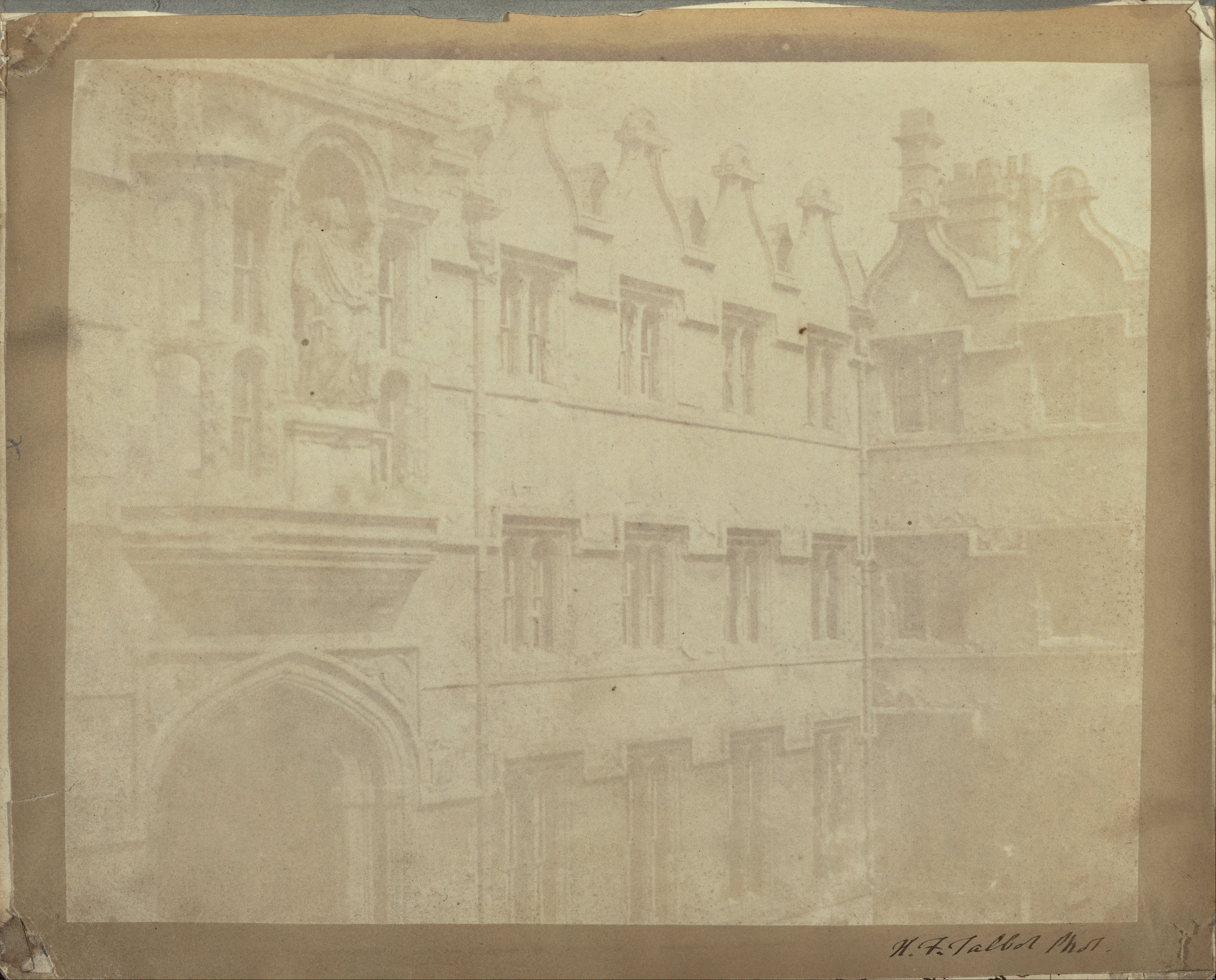
Radcliffe Quadrangle at University College, an early photograph of 1842–4 by Henry Fox Talbot (1800–1877), taken during the mastership of Frederick Plumptre.

Frederick Charles Plumptre (1796–1870) was a Victorian academic and administrator. He was Master of University College, Oxford for many years until the end of his life and concurrently Vice-Chancellor of Oxford University for four years.

Frederick Plumptre was from an academic family, mainly at Cambridge. He attained a second class degree in Literae Humaniores in 1817 at University College, Oxford, and was elected a Fellow in the same year. He became Dean and Tutor of the college from 1821.

Plumptre had an interest in architecture and served three terms as President of the Oxford Architectural Society. He was involved in the restoration and building of several churches in Oxford. He was also a member of the Delegacy (building committee), established on 8 April 1854, that set up the Oxford University Museum.

Augustus Hare, who matriculated at University College in 1853, said of him:

"It would be impossible to discover a more perfect ‘old gentleman’ than Dr Plumptre, though he was often laughed at. When he was inquiring into any fault, he would begin with, 'Now pray take care what you say, because whatever you say I shall believe.' He had an old-fashioned veneration for rank, and let Lord Egmont off lectures two days in the week that he might hunt – 'it was so suitable.'”

== Plumptre Award ==
The Plumptre Exhibition is awarded by University College each year to students who have demonstrated good academic work, conduct and contribution to College life.

Recipients of the Plumptre Award
| Year | Exhibitioner | Major or minor |
|---|---|---|
| 2012 | Lewis Coenen-Rowe | Major |
| 2012 | Dan Tomlinson | Major |
| 2012 | Marie McHugh | Major |
| 2013 | Aamira Khan | Minor |
| 2013 | Julia Moehlen | Major |
| 2016 | Maninderbir Sachdeva | Major |
| 2018 | Rebecca Williams | Minor |
| 2018 | Heba Jalil | Major |
| 2019 | Ffion Price | Minor |
| 2020 | Heba Jalil | Major |
| 2020 | Ruqayah Juyel | Minor |
| 2021 | Sarah Chapman | Major |

Academic offices
| Preceded by George Rowley | Master of University College, Oxford; 1836–1870 | Succeeded by George Granville Bradley |
| Preceded by Benjamin Parsons Symons | Vice-Chancellor of Oxford University; 1848–1852 | Succeeded by Richard Lynch Cotton |
