= Jack Hibbert =

Sir Jack Hibbert
- Born: 14 February 1932; Huddersfield, Yorkshire
- Died: 23 August 2005 (aged 73); Weybridge, Surrey
- Education: Leeds Grammar School; London School of Economics
- Occupation: Statistician
- Spouse(s): Joan Clarkson, m. 1957
- Children: Two sons, one daughter

Sir Jack Hibbert KCB (14 February 1932 – 23 August 2005) was a British statistician and director of the Central Statistical Office (CSO) of the United Kingdom, 1985–1992. He was knighted in the 1990 New Year Honours.

== Background ==
Sir Jack Hibbert was born in Huddersfield, Yorkshire, on 14 February 1932. He was educated at Leeds Grammar School and the London School of Economics and was married with two sons and one daughter. He died on 23 August 2005 in Weybridge, Surrey.

== Career ==
Hibbert joined the Exchequer and Audit Department in 1952 and then moved to the Central Statistical Office in 1960, where he worked on economics statistics. He was promoted to chief statistician in 1970 and to assistant director in 1977. In 1981, he spent a period on loan to the OECD and to Eurostat as a consultant and then joined the Department of Trade and Industry as a director of statistics. On 1 August 1985, he was appointed director of the Central Statistical Office in succession to Sir John Boreham. He retired in 1992.

== Central Statistical Office ==
When Jack Hibbert took over the CSO, it had suffered four years of cutbacks following the 'Rayner Review' of official statistics. Shortly after this, the then Chancellor of the Exchequer, Nigel Lawson, and other Conservative politicians claimed that misleading statistics were largely responsible for the Government's poor handling of the economy. The Treasury and Civil Service Select Committee recommended 'a thorough review into the operation of various Departments involved in the collection of national accounts statistics'. The review, by Stephen Pickford, recommended that there should be just one organisation responsible for the collection and compilation of statistics for national accounts.

This meant moving the Business Statistics Office and responsibility for data on imports and exports from the Department of Trade and Industry, and responsibility for the Retail Prices Index from the Department of Employment. The changes, in July 1989, increased the CSO from just under 170 staff to about 1,000. This was probably the biggest shake-up of official statistics since the creation of the CSO in 1941. Jack Hibbert had the difficult job of creating this new organisation.

== Bibliography ==
- Lynch, R. (2006), Sir Jack Hibbert, 1932–2005, Journal of the Royal Statistical Society: Series A (Statistics in Society) 169 (2), pp 382–383.
- Lynch, R., Obituary: Sir Jack Hibbert, The Independent, 12 September 2005, retrieved on 15 May 2007 17:27.
- Ward, R. & Doggett, T. (1991), Keeping Score: The First Fifty Years of the Central Statistical Office, London: HMSO. ISBN 0-903308-02-9

Government offices
Preceded by John Boreham	Director of the Central Statistical Office, UK; 1985–1992	Succeeded by Bill McLennan
