= Claus Moser, Baron Moser =

British statistician

The Right Honourable The Lord Moser KCB CBE

Director of the Central Statistical Office
- In office 1967–1978
- Preceded by: Harry Campion
- Succeeded by: John Boreham

Member of the House of Lords
- Lord Temporal
- Life peerage 23 June 2001 – 4 September 2015

Personal details
- Born: Claus Adolf Moser; 24 November 1922 Berlin, German Reich
- Died: 4 September 2015 (aged 92) Chur, Switzerland
- Citizenship: British
- Spouse: Mary Moser
- Education: Frensham Heights School
- Alma mater: London School of Economics
- Occupation: Statistician

Military service
- Allegiance: United Kingdom
- Branch/service: Royal Air Force
- Years of service: 1943–1946

Claus Adolf Moser, Baron Moser, KCB, CBE (24 November 1922 – 4 September 2015) was a British statistician who made major contributions in both academia and the Civil Service. He prided himself rather on being a non-mathematical statistician, and said that the thing that frightened him most in his life was when Maurice Kendall asked him to teach a course on analysis of variance at the LSE.

== Biography ==
=== Family and early years ===
Claus Adolf Moser was born in Berlin in 1922. His father was Dr Ernst (Ernest) Moser (1885–1957), owner of the private bank Ernst Moser & Co. in Berlin (est. 1902, liquidated in 1938). His mother was Lotte (née Goldberg, 1897–1976), a talented amateur musician. The spouses also had an elder son, Claus's brother Heinz Peter August. Their house was a centre of attraction, visited by many intellectuals and musicians of the time. Claus Moser learned to play the piano from the age of seven and became an accomplished musician. In 1936, in order to escape Nazi persecution, the family fled to England. Moser went to Frensham Heights School and the London School of Economics (LSE). At this point, he dreamed about becoming a professional musician. However, his music teacher advised him against it, saying that ‘music is much more enjoyable if one's financial situation does not depend on it’.

Despite being Jewish, in 1940, Clause Moser was interned as enemy alien along with his father and brother. They were sent to Huyton Camp. He confessed that in the camp he was surrounded by brilliant cultured German and Austrian Jews, refugees from Nazi Germany. In Huyton, Moser became assistant to a professor of Mathematics who occupied his time conducting a survey of the inmates. Thus he discovered his love for numbers and became a statistician. Moser was released after four month and with the support of his headmaster Sir Alexander Carr-Saunders managed to enroll to the LSE in November 1940.

Moser graduated in 1943 and volunteered for active service in the Royal Air Force. He applied for aircrew but was rejected because of his German origin. Moser became a ground crew member and reached the rank of sergeant. On the last day of war he suffered a severe car accident near the Belgian-German border and went through several operations during his prolonged recovery. He was demobilized in 1946.

=== Academic career ===
In 1946, Moser returned to the LSE as an Assistant Lecturer in Statistics. He took British citizenship in 1947. In 1949, he married Mary, née Oxlin, his fellow student at the LSE. The couple tied the knot in 1949, three kids – Kath, Sue and Peter – were born in the 1950s. In October 1946, he was promoted to Lecturer, and in October 1955 – to Reader. In 1957-58, Moser worked in Geneva in the Statistics Division of the International Labour Office. Along with numerous scientific publications, in 1958 Moser published Survey Methods in Social Investigation, a highly successful book which was reprinted eight times before the second edition was released in 1971. In 1961, Moser became Professor of Social Statistics.

His further career was shaped by a 1961 appointment as Statistical Advisor at the Robbins Committee. Chaired by Lord Robbins, the Committee was established to analyze the future of higher education in the UK. The 2-year long survey became the core of Moser's Higher Education Research Unit which he established at the LSE in 1964.

In 1965 Moser was elected a Fellow of the American Statistical Association. He was appointed a Commander of the Order of the British Empire (CBE) in the 1965 New Year Honours. However, in the same year he was refused an appointment in the central statistical office.

=== Civil service ===
In 1967 Harold Wilson appointed Moser Director of the Central Statistical Office. In 1968, he headed the Government Statistical Service. These were two distinct roles, informally, Moser was considered to be the general statistical advisor to the government. He managed to reform the role of the statisticians and made them more involved in policy making. As a part of Moser reforms introduced to the GSS, in 1967 a Government Social Survey Department was established, followed by the launch of the Office of Population, Censuses and Surveys in 1970 which started the General Household Survey. One of his innovations was the introduction of Social Trends, a publication launched in 1970 and edited by Muriel Nissel that provided an annual picture of the state of society. The data relied mostly on the materials held by the OPCS.

Moser was known for his integrity and credibility. He refused to manipulate data even when ordered by the government. A frequently cited story recalls how, shortly before the 1970 election, Prime Minister Harold Wilson called Moser and demanded that two jumbo jets be excluded from the UK's trade balance and their cost spread over several months rather than the month of purchase, in an attempt to conceal the deterioration in the country's trade balance. Moser refused, the red figures were published, and Labour lost the election. According to The Telegraph, Wilson blamed Moser for the rest of his life.

He resigned as Director of the Central Statistical Office in 1978 and joined NM Rothschild and Sons as a director and vice-chairman. Moser played a vital role in the bank's appointment as investment consultant to the government of Singapore. He chaired the Economist Intelligence Unit from 1979 to 1983.

=== Music ===
Moser kept playing piano for all his life and served on the boards of Glyndebourne Opera, the London Philharmonic Orchestra, the BBC Music Advisory Committee, and as a governor of the Royal Academy of Music. In 1965, on Lord Robbins's recommendation, Moser was appointed to the board of the Royal Opera House. In 1974, Moser succeeded Lord Drogheda as chairman, and served until 1987. He strived to keep ticket prices low during a period when state funding was extremely scarce. Though by some he was criticized for conservatism, his achievements as Chairman include attracting international conductors such as Karl Böhm, Carlos Kleiber and Georg Solti, to perform at the Royal Opera House.

=== Late years ===
In 1984 Moser returned to academic life to work as warden of Wadham College, Oxford. He retired at the age of 70. On retirement, he became Chairman of the British Museum Development Trust.

In 1997, he was appointed Chairman of the newly established Basic Skill Agency. Under Moser, in a two-years survey the working group discovered and reported the drastic state of public education in England: it turned out that 7 mln adults did not have the level of reading and writing ability expected of an 11 year old, with the total for adults with numeracy problems running at approximately 40%. Moser's report offered a well articulated 10-step strategy to improve literacy and numeracy on a national level. In this report, Moser delivered a memorable phrase that is still widely quoted today: "Education costs a lot of money; but ignorance costs a lot more".

Through the years, Moser sat on around 40 boards, commissions, committees, trusts and governing bodies. These included:

- Member, Governing Body, Royal Academy of Music, 1967–1979;
- Director, Central Statistical Office, 1968–1978;
- BBC Music Advisory Committee, 1971–1983;
- Visiting Fellow, Nuffield College, Oxford, 1972–1980;
- Chairman, Royal Opera House, Covent Garden, 1974–1987;
- Director, N M Rothschild & Sons, 1978–1990 (Vice-chairman, 1978–1984);
- President, Royal Statistical Society, 1978–1980;
- Chairman, Economist Intelligence Unit, 1979–1983;
- Warden of Wadham College, Oxford, 1984–1993;
- Chancellor, Keele University, 1986–2002;
- Trustee, London Philharmonic Orchestra, 1988–2000;
- President, British Association for the Advancement of Science, 1989–1990;
- Pro-Vice-Chancellor, University of Oxford, 1991–1993;
- Chairman, British Museum Development Trust, 1993–2003, later Chairman Emeritus;
- Chancellor, Open University of Israel, 1994–2004.

While on holiday with his family, Moser died in Chur, Switzerland, on 4 September 2015, following a stroke.

== Honours and awards ==
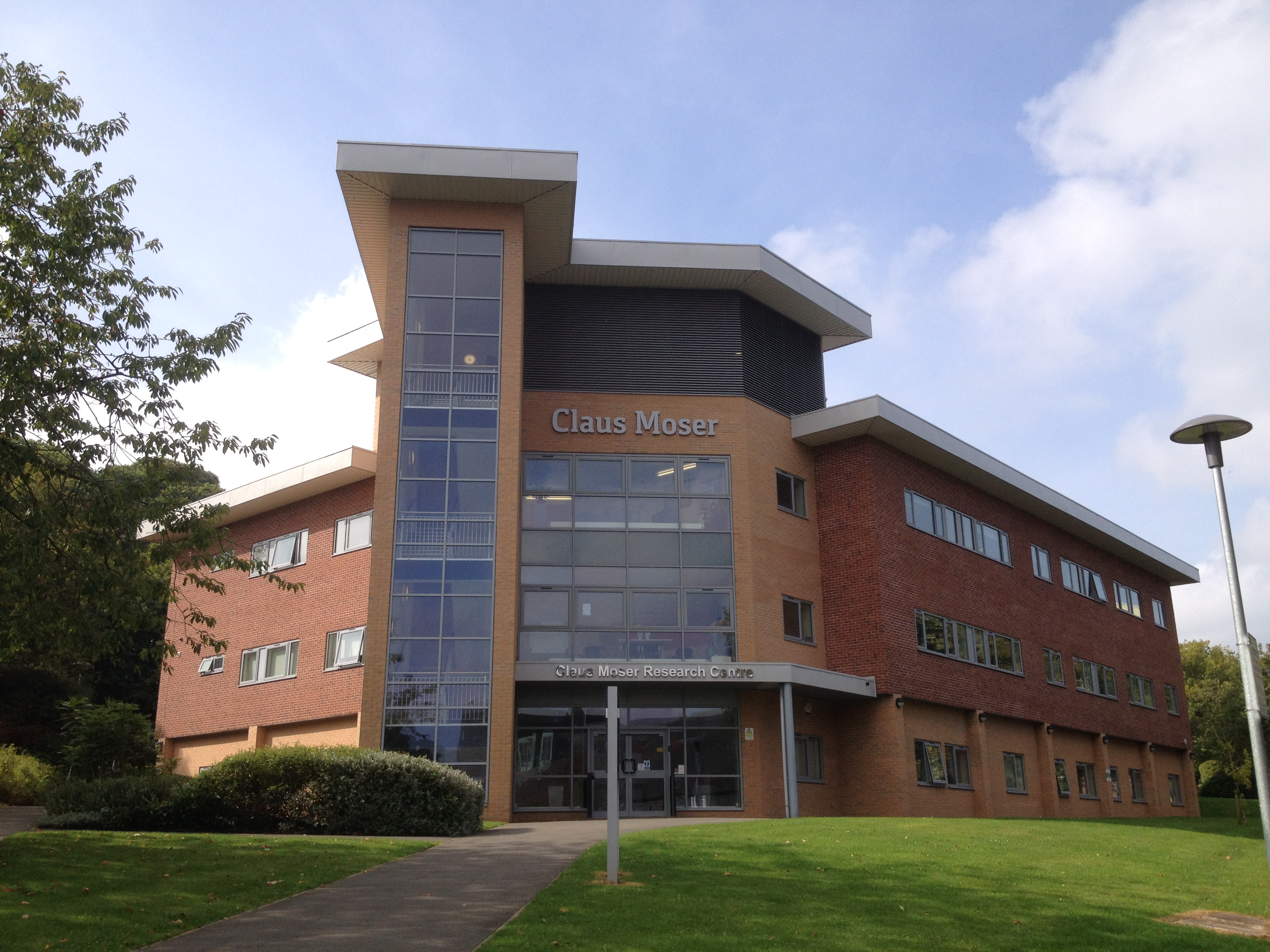
Claus Moser Building, University of Keele

He was made a Knight Commander of the Bath (KCB) in the 1973 New Year Honours.

Moser was an academic governor of the Technion in Haifa in 1994–2004.

He was made a life peer with the title Baron Moser, of Regents Park in the London Borough of Camden on 23 June 2001. Other honours included the Albert Medal of the Royal Society of Arts, 1996, Commandeur de l'Ordre National du Mérite (France), 1976; Commander's Cross, Order of Merit (Germany), 1985.

Moser also received an Honorary Doctorate from Heriot-Watt University in 1995.

In 2008, the Claus Moser Research Centre Building was opened at Keele. A dedicated research facility for the Humanities and Social Sciences, the £3.5m building was officially opened in June 2008, Claus Moser attended the ceremony.

By 2013, Moser had obtained 19 honorary degrees.

== Mary Moser (Oxlin) ==
Moser's lifelong spouse Mary Moser (1921–2022), née Oxlin, was a Swiss-British artist and psychiatrist. Oxlin spent her early years in Arosa near Chur, Switzerland. She began painting as a child and showed remarkable talent.

During World War II, she studied at the London School of Economics. Later, she trained as a Psychiatric Social Worker. In 1945, she was elected to Holborn Council and became the youngest Labour councillor in the country. In 1949, she married Claus Moser.

In 1984, when the family moved to Oxford when Claus Moser was Warden of Wadham College, Mary Moser became a prominent figure on the local art scene, a member of the Oxford Art Society and Oxford Printmakers Cooperative. She managed Oxfordshire Artweeks, and kept painting, immersed in experiments with abstract art. On 23 June 2001, she was styled Baroness Moser. In 2003, the Mary Mozer award was established, dedicated to artists exhibiting in Artweeks who had taken up art later in life as a second career.

== See also ==
- List of British Jewish scientists

== Sources ==
- Bartholomew, David (2017). "Claus Adolf Moser 1922–2015". Biographical Memoirs of Fellows of the British Academy, XVI (PDF). The British Academy.
- Dickinson, Peter (2013). Music Education in Crisis: The Bernarr Rainbow Lectures and Other Assessments. Boydell & Brewer Ltd. ISBN 9781843838807.
- Basil, Mahon (2009). Knowledge is Power (PDF). UN Stats. pp. 12–14.
- Moser, Claus; Champkin, Julian (2007). "A Life in Statistics". Significance. 4 (1): 27–30. doi:10.1111/j.1740-9713.2007.00217.x.

Government offices
| Preceded by Harry Campion | Director of the Central Statistical Office; 1967–1978 | Succeeded by John Boreham |
Academic offices
| Preceded by Stuart Hampshire | Warden of Wadham College, Oxford; 1984–1993 | Succeeded by John S. Flemming |
| Preceded by The Princess Margaret, Countess of Snowdon | Chancellor of Keele University; 1986–2002 | Succeeded by David Weatherall |
