= John Flemming =

John Stanton Flemming CBE FBA (6 February 1941, Reading, Berkshire, England – 5 August 2003, Oxford, England) was an economist and Warden of Wadham College, Oxford.

John S. Flemming was educated at Rugby School, and then at Trinity College, Oxford, where in 1962 he attained a first class degree in Philosophy, Politics and Economics. He specialised in logic and economic theory, and was selected as a Student of Nuffield College, Oxford.

Flemming became a Lecturer and Fellow of Oriel College, Oxford (1963–65) and then Official Fellow in Economics at Nuffield College (1965–80). At Nuffield College he was Bursar from 1970 to 1979 and emeritus Fellow from 1980 until his death. He was also a Pro-Vice-Chancellor of Oxford University.

John Flemming was the editor of The Economic Journal from 1976 to 1980, chief adviser at the Bank of England from 1980 to 1984, economic adviser to the governor of the Bank of England from 1984 to 1988, and executive director from 1988 to 1991. He was then chief economist of the newly created European Bank for Reconstruction and Development (EBRD) from 1991 to 1993 and Warden of Wadham College, Oxford from 1993 to 2003. He was a member of the board of Brunel University.

He was elected a fellow of the British Academy in 1991 and received a CBE in 2001.

In 1963, Flemming married Jean Briggs. They had a daughter and three sons. He lived in Summertown and Park Town in North Oxford.

Academic offices
| Preceded by Claus Moser | Warden of Wadham College, Oxford; 1993–2003 | Succeeded by Sir Neil Chalmers |
