= Harry Campion =

British statistician

Campion in 1957.

Sir Harry Campion, KCB, CBE (20 May 1905 – 24 May 1996) was a British statistician and the first director of what was the Central Statistical Office of the United Kingdom. He was also first director of the United Nations Statistical Office. He played a leading role in the development of official statistics, nationally and internationally, after the Second World War.

== Background and early career ==
Harry Campion (later Sir Harry Campion) was born in Worsley, Lancashire, and was educated at Farnworth Grammar School and Manchester University. After leaving university, Campion joined the newly formed Cotton Trade Statistical Bureau, which collected data on output and sales of the cotton industry in the UK and also data on cotton industries of other countries and principal export markets and where he took part in the preparation of a regular digest of statistics. He spent 1932 in the United States, having been awarded a Rockefeller Foundation scholarship, then returned to Manchester University where he became Robert Ottley Reader in Statistics from 1933 to 1939 and set up an Economic Research Section carrying out applied research. While at Manchester he published research on the distribution of national capital using estate duty data and a book on public and private property. In 1939, Mr Campion joined the Central Economic Intelligence Service (CEIS), part of the War Cabinet Office, whose purpose was to provide economic and statistical material for a continuous survey of financial and economic plans and where Campion's role was to organise the statistics needed.

== Career at the Central Statistical Office ==
In January 1941, the Central Statistical Office was established to co-ordinate all statistics brought before the War Cabinet and soon after, Campion became its first director. The CSO became established as a permanent feature of government focusing on the development of national income accounts. After the war, Campion was seconded to the United Nations for a year to organise the creation of the United Nations Statistical Office. Following this secondment, Campion returned to the CSO until his retirement in March 1967.

Some of the statistical products which first saw the light of day in the Harry Campion era are:

- Monthly Digest of Statistics, first published in 1946.
- Statistics of Trade Act 1947.
- Standard Industrial Classification, completed in 1947 and introduced in 1948.
- Annual Abstract, first post-war publication at beginning of 1948.
- Index of Industrial Production, first published in February 1948.
- Economic Trends, appeared in November 1953.
- Development of the National accounts including:

- Employment Policy White Paper, first published in 1946.
- National Income and Expenditure Blue Book, first produced in September 1952.
- Sources and Methods, first edition published in 1956.
- quarterly estimates of national expenditure, first published in 1957.
- constant price estimates, appeared in 1959.
- seasonally adjusted estimates, appeared in 1960.
- quarterly balance of payments estimates and the Balance of Payments Pink Book, first published in 1960.

- Financial Statistics, first appeared in 1962.

== United Nations ==
After the Second World War, the United Nations Economic and Social Council (ECOSOC) invited a number of prominent national statisticians, including Harry Campion, to form a 'Nuclear' Statistical Commission, which met from 1–14 May 1946 and made recommendations for the composition and terms of a permanent commission on statistics; the organisation of a statistical organisation; the disposition of existing statistical activities conducted by the League of Nations; the relationship between the statistical activities of the UN and specialised agencies; and the relationship between the statistical activities of the UN and other non-governmental organisations. Shortly afterward, Campion was seconded, at the request of the first Secretary General of the United Nations, Mr Trygve Lie, to the UN for a year to organise the creation of the United Nations Statistical Office.

== Death and bequests ==
Sir Harry Campion died in 1996 aged 91.

On his death, Sir Harry Campion bequeathed half the residue of his estate to the Royal Statistical Society, who decided to commemorate him and the prominent part he played in the development of official statistics through a Fellowship. The Campion Fellowship is awarded every two years with the maximum sum of money available on any occasion being £10,000, to Fellows of the Society to promote a specific piece of work or project that would make a significant contribution to the development, use or exposition of statistics on the economic or social well being of the population.

The Manchester Statistical Society was also a beneficiary of the estate of Sir Harry Campion and similarly the bequest was placed into a trust fund to provide occasional modest grants to support research consistent with the Society's objective and history.

== Posts held ==
- Director, Central Statistical Office, UK, 1941–1967.
- Member of the 'Nuclear' United Nations Statistics Commission, 1–15 May 1946.
- Director, United Nations Statistical Office, 1946–1947
- Chairman, United Nations Statistics Commission, 1951 & 1953.
- President, Royal Statistical Society, 1957–1959.
- President, International Statistical Institute, 1963–1967.
- Vice-President, Manchester Statistical Society.

== Awards ==
- CBE (1945).
- CB (1949).
- RSS Guy Medal in Silver (1950).
- KCB (1957).
- Fellow of the American Statistical Association (1961)
- Honorary LLB, Manchester (1967).

Preceded by First incumbent	Director of the Central Statistical Office; 1941–1967	Succeeded by Claus Moser (now Lord Moser)
