= Central Statistical Office (United Kingdom) =

CSO

The Central Statistical Office (CSO) was a British government department charged with the collection and publication of economic statistics for the United Kingdom. It preceded the Office for National Statistics.

== Establishment of the CSO ==
During the Second World War, Prime Minister Winston Churchill directed the Cabinet Secretary, Sir Edward Bridges (later Lord Bridges), to advise him on how a central statistical office could be created in the Prime Minister's office in order to consolidate and issue authoritative working statistics. Following consideration, a formal announcement was made to establish the CSO on 27 January 1941 with the purpose of handling the descriptive statistics required for the war effort and developing national income accounts. Shortly afterward, Harry Campion (later Sir Harry Campion), a member of the Central Economic Information Service in the Cabinet Office, was appointed director. After the war there was an expansion in the work of official statisticians resulting from the aim of managing the economy through controlling government income and expenditure using an integrated system of national accounts and in 1962, comprehensive financial statistics were published for the first time.

== Development of the CSO ==
Following Sir Harry Campion's retirement in March 1967, Claus Moser (later Lord Moser), a professor of statistics at the London School of Economics, was appointed director. Moser had the task of implementing proposals made by the House of Commons Estimates Committee in 1966, including the setting up of the Business Statistics Office to provide a centralised system of obtaining information from industry and the Office for Population, Censuses and Surveys to collect information from individuals and households through programmes of censuses, surveys and registers. He made major improvements in the area of social statistics in close partnership with the Office of Population Censuses and Surveys and paid particular attention to the development of the CSO's role of co-ordinating the statistical activities of individual government departments and the development of the Government Statistical Service (GSS), of which he became the head in 1968. After eleven years of statistical development and reorganisation, Moser resigned on 1 August 1978. The third director of the CSO was John Boreham (later Sir John Boreham), Moser's deputy.

== The Rayner Review ==
In 1979, a new government came into office with a review of the CSO and the Government Statistical Service as an early part of its policy of reducing the size of the Civil Service. This review, conducted by Sir, later Lord Derek Rayner and known as the Rayner Review, was published in a government white paper in April 1981 and recommended that 'information should not be collected primarily for publication (but) primarily because government needs it for its own business'. The Government accepted this recommendation and as a result, the CSO was cut by around 25% but continued to produce the same range of economic statistics.

== Expansion of the CSO ==
After 35 years in the Government Statistical Service, Sir John Boreham retired on 31 July 1985 and was succeeded by Jack Hibbert, who became the fourth director of the CSO. During 1986 and 1987, quality problems with the economics statistics produced by the CSO, due partly to the effects of deregulation and to changes to the structure of the economy, became apparent.

A review conducted by Stephen Pickford made a number of recommendations for further research and more significantly, recommended greater centralisation of work on economic statistics. Consequently, the Business Statistics Office, most of the two statistics divisions responsible for data on imports and exports at the Department of Trade and Industry, and the statistics division responsible for the Retail Prices Index at the Department of Employment were merged with the CSO in 1989.

An improvement programme followed in 1990 at the request of the then Chancellor of the Exchequer, John Major, which focused on the national accounts and the balance of payments. In November 1991 the CSO was launched as an executive agency, detached from the Cabinet Office, which helped to put focus on the quality of service provided and gave an opportunity to restate publicly the arrangements to ensure the integrity of official statistics.

== Creation of the Office for National Statistics ==
On 1 April 1996, the CSO merged with the Office of Population Censuses and Surveys (OPCS) to form the Office for National Statistics (ONS) under a single director, Professor Tim Holt.

== Bibliography ==
- Reg Ward and Ted Doggett, Keeping Score: The First Fifty Years of the Central Statistical Office, Central Statistical Office, 1991. ISBN 0-903308-02-9.
- W. Rudoe, 'Obituary: Sir Harry Campion, 1905–96'. Journal of the Royal Statistical Society. Series A (Statistics in Society), Vol. 160, No. 1 (1997), pp. 148–151.
