= John Griffiths (academic) =

British academic (1806–1885)

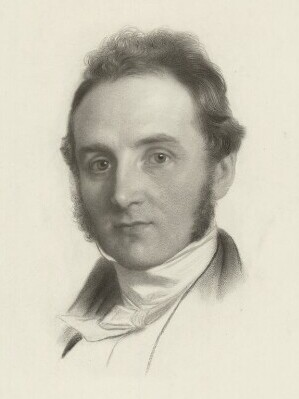
- Mezzotint of Griffiths by Samuel Cousins after George Frederic Watts (1854)
- Born: 27 July 1806
- Died: 14 August 1885
- Resting place: St Sepulchre's Cemetery
- Education: Wadham College
- Occupations: archivist; academic
- Employer: University of Oxford

John Griffiths (27 July 1806 – 14 August 1885) was an academic at the University of Oxford, where he was Warden of Wadham College and Keeper of the Archives.

== Life ==
John Griffiths, the son of a clergyman and schoolteacher also called John Griffiths, was born on 27 July 1806 in Rochester, Kent. He was educated at the King's School, Rochester (his father's school) and at Winchester College, before joining the University of Oxford as a scholar of Wadham College in 1824. He obtained his Bachelor of Arts degree in 1827, and was made a Fellow of Wadham in 1830, lecturing in classics and then in divinity. He was ordained as a priest in the Church of England in 1829, and became preacher at the Chapel Royal, Whitehall in 1854. He was one of the "Four Tutors" who protested in March 1841 against the Anglo-Catholic John Henry Newman's Tract 90, despite his dislike of controversy. He later explained that he disliked the anonymous basis on which the tract had been published, with an implicit link to the university, as well as its content. His fellowship at Wadham lasted until 1854 under the statutes prevailing at the time, and he then resigned and moved to Hampton Wick. Appointed as Keeper of the Archives in 1857 (a position he held until his death), he returned to Oxford. In 1871, reluctantly, he became Warden of Wadham, resigning in 1881. He also served on various committees and held other administrative positions within the university.

His publications include editions of classical texts, and some works connected with Oxford: An Index to Wills Proved in the Court of the Chancellor of the University of Oxford (1862), and an edition of the Laudian university statutes (1888). He collected medals and prints, and sold one Rembrandt etching for £1,510 in May 1883 (equivalent to about £159,000 in present-day terms) – at that time, the highest price paid for one print. He was known as a courteous and hospitable man, formal in his dress and behaviour, and rather reserved (which seemed not to help relations with Wadham's undergraduates). He died in his home in Oxford on 14 August 1885.

Academic offices
Preceded by Benjamin Parsons Symons	Warden of Wadham College, Oxford; 1871–1881	Succeeded by George E. Thorley
