= Ron Hedley =

British zoologist

Ronald Henderson Hedley CB FZS (2 November 1928 – 11 July 2006) was a British zoologist who was Director of the Natural History Museum from 1976 to 1988.

== Career ==
Hedley was first employed at the Natural History Museum in 1955. In 1971, he was appointed Deputy Director of the museum and in 1976 became Director of the museum. In 1988 Hedley retired from the Natural History Museum.

From 1977 to 1980, Hedley was the honorary secretary of the Zoological Society of London.

== Personal life ==
Hedley was born on 2 November 1928 to Henry Armstrong Hedley and Margaret Hopper. He was educated at Durham Johnston School, followed by King's College at Durham University (now Newcastle University), where he obtained a Bachelor's degree in Zoology and a PhD in 1953.

Hedley married Valmai Mary Griffith in 1957, the couple had one son. He died aged 77 on 11 July 2006.

Cultural offices
Preceded by Sir Frank Claringbull	Director of the Natural History Museum; 1988–2004	Succeeded by Sir Neil Chalmers
Professional and academic associations
Preceded by Solly Zuckerman	Secretary of the Zoological Society of London; 1977–1980	Succeeded by Erasmus Darwin Barlow
