= Nicholas Lloyd (lexicographer) =

English cleric and academic (1630-1680)

Nicholas Lloyd (1630–1680) was an English cleric and academic, best known as a historical compiler for his Dictionarium Historicum.

== Life ==
The son of George Lloyd, rector of Wonston, Hampshire, he was born in the parsonage-house there on 28 May 1630, and educated at home by his father till 1643, when he was admitted a chorister of Winchester College. He became a scholar of Winchester in 1644, and remained there till September 1651. He entered Hart Hall, Oxford, 13 May 1652, was admitted a scholar of Wadham College on 20 October 1653, proceeded B.A. 16 January 1656, was elected to a fellowship at Wadham 30 June 1656, and commenced M.A. 6 July 1658. He was appointed lecturer at St. Martin's (Carfax), Oxford, in Lent 1664, and was rector of the parish from 1665 to 1670. In July 1665 he was appointed university rhetoric reader, and he was twice elected sub-warden of Wadham College (1666 and 1670).

In 1665, when Walter Blandford, Warden of Wadham College, became Bishop of Oxford, he chose Lloyd as his chaplain; and when Blandford was translated to the see of Worcester, in 1671, Lloyd accompanied him. The bishop eventually presented him to the rectory of St. Mary, Newington Butts, Surrey. He was formally inducted 28 April 1673; but did not take up residence there till August 1677.

Lloyd died at Newington Butts on 27 November 1680, and was buried in the chancel of his church without any memorial.

== Works ==
Lloyd published a Dictionarium Historicum, Oxford, 1670, based on the dictionaries of Charles Estienne, and Philippus Ferrarius (Filippo Ferrari). He then enlarged and remodelled this encyclopædic work, which was republished.

John Aubrey said he had seen several manuscripts written by Lloyd. Some are in Rawlinson collection of manuscripts in the Bodleian Library.
