= Doug Gurr =

British businessman (born 1964)

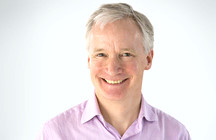
- Born: Douglas John Gurr; July 1964 (age 62); Leeds, West Riding of Yorkshire, England
- Education: University of Cambridge (BA); University of Edinburgh (PhD)
- Occupation: Businessman
- Title: Director, Natural History Museum, London
- Term: 2020–present
- Predecessor: Michael Dixon
- Children: 2
- Scientific career
- Thesis: Semantic frameworks for complexity (1990)
- Doctoral advisor: Gordon Plotkin
- Website: www.gov.uk/government/people/doug-gurr--2

Douglas John Gurr (born July 1964) is a British businessman, and the director of the Natural History Museum, London. In February 2026, he was announced as the chair of the Competition and Markets Authority, having been interim chair since January 2025. He was a global vice-president and head of Amazon UK from 2016 to 2020. He was chairman of the British Heart Foundation. He has taught at Aarhus University and held positions in the United Kingdom civil service, McKinsey & Co, and Asda.

== Early life ==
Gurr was born in Leeds, England, in July 1964, to parents from New Zealand, and his father was head of the English department at the University of Nairobi. He was educated at Theale Green School and the University of Cambridge where he studied the Mathematical Tripos and the University of Edinburgh where he was awarded a PhD in 1990 for research on semantic frameworks using monads supervised by Gordon Plotkin.

== Career ==
Gurr began his career as an academic teaching maths and computing at the Aarhus University in Denmark, before working for the United Kingdom's Civil Service.

Gurr then worked for McKinsey & Co, for six years, where he became a partner. He then founded Blueheath, an internet-enabled wholesaler, which was later sold to Booker Group.

He was then a main board director of Asda. He joined Amazon in 2011, and was China country manager from 2014 to 2016, before becoming UK country manager in 2016.

Gurr has been the chairman of the British Heart Foundation since 2015, and a non-executive director of the UK government's Department for Work and Pensions. He is also a trustee of the Landmark Trust.

In July 2018, Gurr received widespread attention for his claim that a no-deal Brexit could lead to civil unrest "within two weeks".

Gurr was appointed as director of the Natural History Museum, London in 2020.

As of 2021, he is a non-executive director of the Department of Health and Social Care, with 'responsibility for the union'.

From July 2022, Gurr was appointed chair of the board of trustees of The Alan Turing Institute, the UK's national institute for data science and artificial intelligence. He stepped down from that role in April 2026.

In January 2025, he was announced as the new interim Chair of the Competition and Markets Authority (CMA). Due to his ties to the tech industry, his appointment drew criticism from various non-governmental organisations and trade unions. Despite these criticisms, Secretary of State for Business and Trade Peter Kyle appointed Gurr as permanent chair for the CMA for a period of five years in February 2026.

== Personal life ==
Gurr is married, with two children, and lives in London and Yorkshire. He is a former Scottish international triathlete, and a keen ski mountaineer.

Cultural offices
Preceded by Michael Dixon	Director of the Natural History Museum; 2020–present	Incumbent
