= Sandra Fredman =

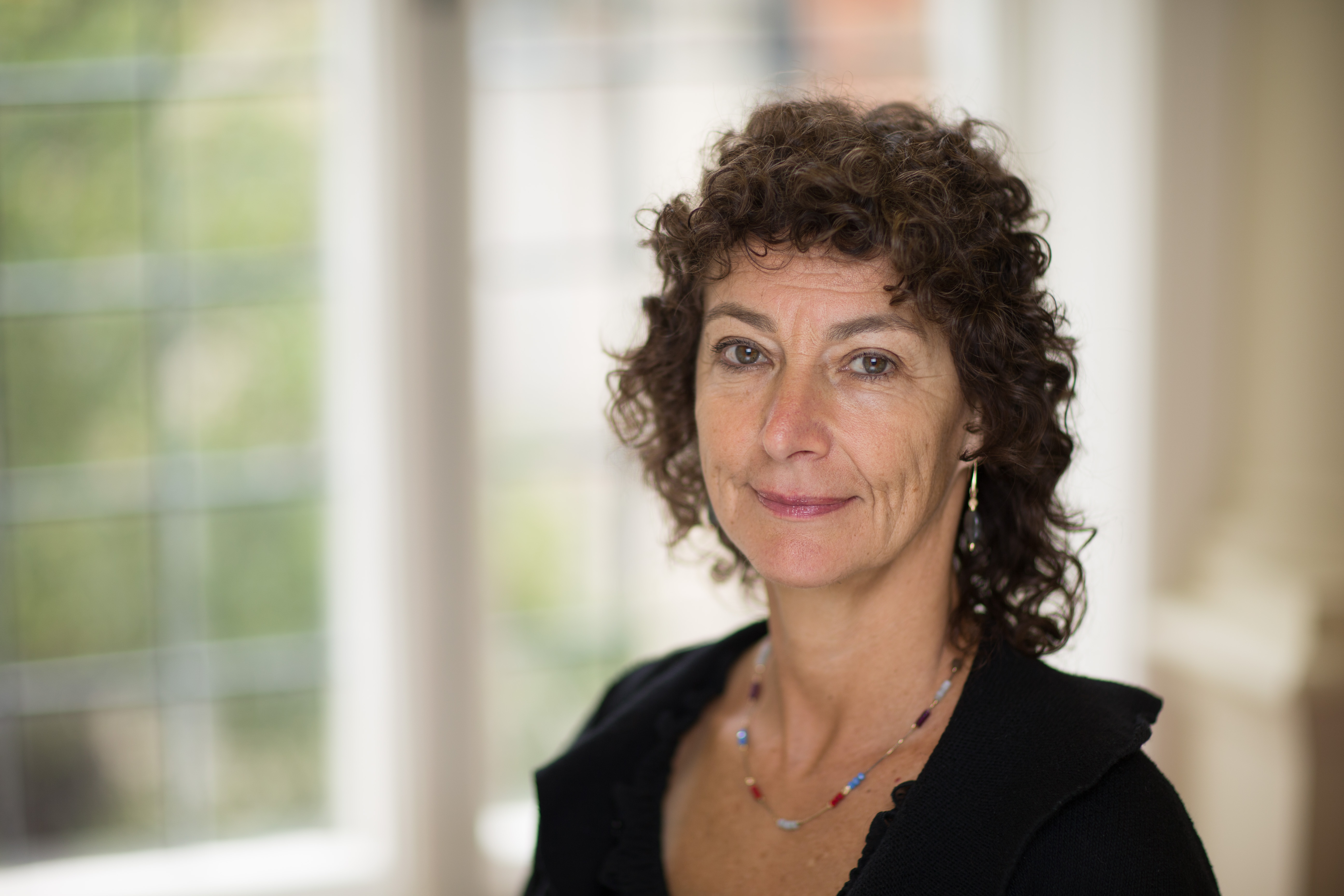

Professor of the Laws of the British Commonwealth and the USA at University of Oxford
- Incumbent
- Assumed office 2011

Personal details
- Education: University of Witwatersrand; University of Oxford

Sandra Fredman FBA, KC (hon) is a professor of law in the Faculty of Law at the University of Oxford and a fellow of Pembroke College, Oxford.

== Early life and education ==
Fredman was born in Johannesburg, South Africa, and received her undergraduate degree in mathematics and philosophy from Witwatersrand University. She then worked for a short time as a political and labour journalist before attending Wadham College, Oxford as a Rhodes Scholar. She received First Class Honours for the BA in Law and the BCL.

== Academic career ==
After graduation, she worked as a trainee solicitor in London at a firm of solicitors specialising trade union and labour law. She then became a Lecturer in labour law at King's College London. After four years in that position she was elected fellow in law at Exeter College, Oxford. In 1996 Fredman was made a Reader and was given the title of professor in 1999. She was elected a Fellow of the British Academy in 2005. In 2011 she was appointed Professor in the Laws of the British Commonwealth and the USA. Funded by the university's Higher Studies Fund, this will be used to develop a focal point for a research and policy network in the comparative human rights law of these jurisdictions. The aim is to integrate academics, policy-makers, judges and students, in Oxford, in developed countries and also in many developing countries in the British Commonwealth which have had little exposure to academic research. The network will initially be focussing on two substantive themes, gender equality, and poverty and human rights.

== Academic interests and teaching ==
Fredman's academic interests include discrimination law, labour law, and human rights law. She teaches constitutional law, administrative law, European human rights law and labour law.

== Private practice ==
Fredman also practises as a barrister and is a member of Old Square Chambers in London.

Fredman founded the Oxford Human Rights Hub (OxHRH), an organisation that aims to bring together academics, practitioners, and policy-makers from across the globe to advance the understanding and protection of human rights and equality.

== Selected publications ==
- Fredman, Sandra (2018). Comparative Human Rights Law. Oxford: Oxford University Press. ISBN 9780199689408.
- Fredman, Sandra; Campbell, Meghan; Taylor, Helen eds. (2018). Human Rights and Equality in Education: Comparative perspectives on the right to education for minorities and disadvantaged groups. Bristol: Policy Press. ISBN 978-1447337638.
- Fredman, Sandra (2008). Human Rights Transformed: Positive Rights and Positive Duties. Oxford: Oxford University Press. ISBN 978-0-19-927276-1.
- Fredman, Sandra (2001). Discrimination Law (Clarendon Law Series). Oxford: Oxford University Press. ISBN 0-19-876566-5.
- Fredman, Sandra (1998). Women and the Law (Oxford Monographs on Labour Law). Clarendon Press. ISBN 0-19-876323-9.
- Fredman, Sandra; Morris, Gillian (1989). State as Employer: Labour Law in the Public Services. Mansell. ISBN 0-7201-2029-2.
- Fredman, Sandra; Hepple, B.A. (1986). Labor Law and Industrial Relations in Great Britain. Kluwer Law International. ISBN 90-6544-262-6.
- Fredman, Sandra (2001). Discrimination and Human Rights: The Case of Racism (Collected Courses of the Academy of European Law). Oxford: Oxford University Press. ISBN 0-19-924245-3.
- Fredman, Sandra; Spencer, Sarah (2003). Age as an Equality Issue: Legal and Policy Perspectives. Hart Publishing. ISBN 1-84113-405-8.
