= Neil Chalmers =

British zoologist and academic

Sir Neil Robert Chalmers (born 19 June 1942) is a British zoologist and academic. He is a former director of the Natural History Museum in London, and former warden of Wadham College, Oxford.

== Early life ==
Chalmers was educated at King's College School, Magdalen College, Oxford (BA), and St John's College, Cambridge (PhD).

== Academic career ==
From 1966 to 1969, Chalmers lectured in zoology at Makarere University College, Kampala, Uganda, and was scientific director at the National Primate Reserve Centre, Nairobi, Kenya from 1969 until 1970. From 1970 until 1988 he worked for the Open University, first as a lecturer, later as dean of science. He was the Director of the Natural History Museum from 1988 until 2004. He became Warden of Wadham College, Oxford, in 2004. He retired in 2012.

== Honours ==
He was appointed Knight Bachelor by HM The Queen in 2001.

== Sources ==
- Oxford Blueprint, 3:10, 15 May 2003.
- University of Oxford Annual Review, 2003/04.
- Natural History Museum Press Release, 9 January 2004.

Cultural offices
| Preceded by Dr. Ron Hedley 1976–1988 | Director of the Natural History Museum; 1988–2004 | Succeeded by Michael Dixon |
Academic offices
| Preceded by John S. Flemming | Warden of Wadham College, Oxford; 2004–2012 | Succeeded by Ken Macdonald |
