= Michael Dixon (museum director) =

British educator and museum director

Sir Michael Dixon DL ARCS
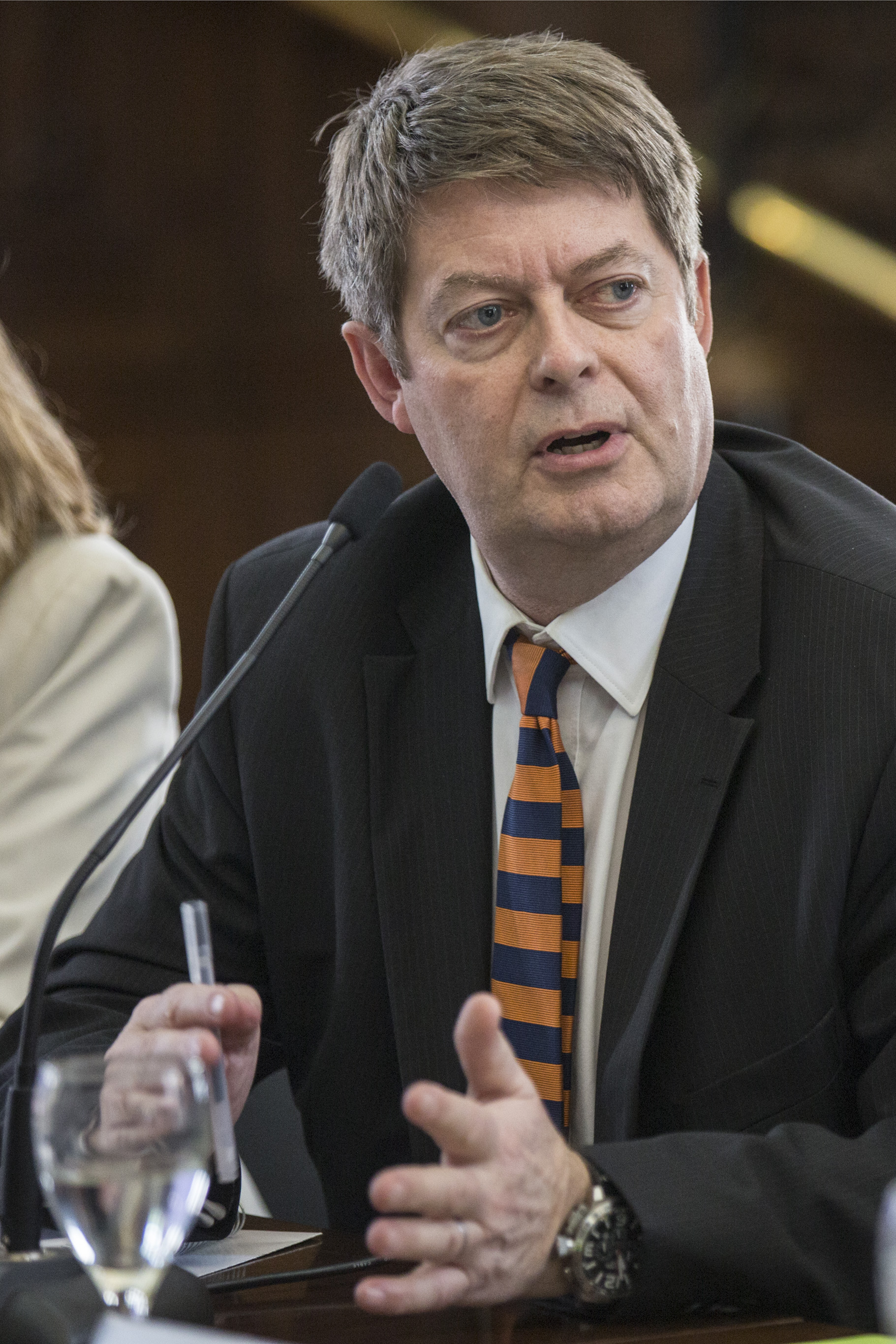
- Michael Dixon in November 2016

Principal of Green Templeton College, Oxford
- Incumbent
- Assumed office 1 September 2020
- Preceded by: Sir Neil Chalmers

Personal details
- Born: 16 March 1956 (age 70)
- Education: Imperial College London (BSc); University of York (DPhil)

Sir Michael Dixon DL (born 16 March 1956) is the principal of Green Templeton College at the University of Oxford and former director of the Natural History Museum, London.

== Early life ==
Dixon was born on 16 March 1956. He was educated at Tiffin School, a boys grammar school in Kingston upon Thames. He studied at Imperial College London, graduating Bachelor of Science (BSc) and was awarded Associateship of the Royal College of Science (ARCS). He undertook postgraduate studies at the University of York, completing his Doctor of Philosophy (DPhil) degree in 1984.

== Career ==
He was director general of the Zoological Society of London and became director of the Natural History Museum on 1 June 2004. The appointment of Dixon at the NHM is noteworthy in its marking a break with tradition in which the director has been an eminent practising scientist.

As of 2015, Dixon was paid a salary of between £160,000 and £164,999 by the Natural History Museum, making him one of the 328 most highly paid people in the British public sector at that time.

He was knighted in the Birthday Honours for 2014 in recognition of his services to museums.

Dixon was elected principal of Green Templeton College, Oxford in 2019 and took up office in September 2020.

== Personal life ==
In 1988, Dixon married Richenda Milton-Thompson. Together they had two children; a daughter, Isabel (born 1990) and a son, Samuel (born 1992). They divorced in 1999. In 2001, he married for a second time to Deborah Mary Reece (née McMahon). Together they have one son, Noah (born 1999).

== Notes ==
- 'Dixon to head Natural History Museum', The Independent (10 January 2004)
- National Museum Directors Conference

Cultural offices
Preceded by Neil Chalmers	Director of the Natural History Museum; 2004–2020	Succeeded by Doug Gurr
Academic offices
Preceded by Denise Lievesley	Principal of Green Templeton College, Oxford; 2020–present	Incumbent
