= James Gerard (clergyman) =

Clergyman and Warden of Wadham College, Oxford from 1777 to 1783

Dr James Gerard
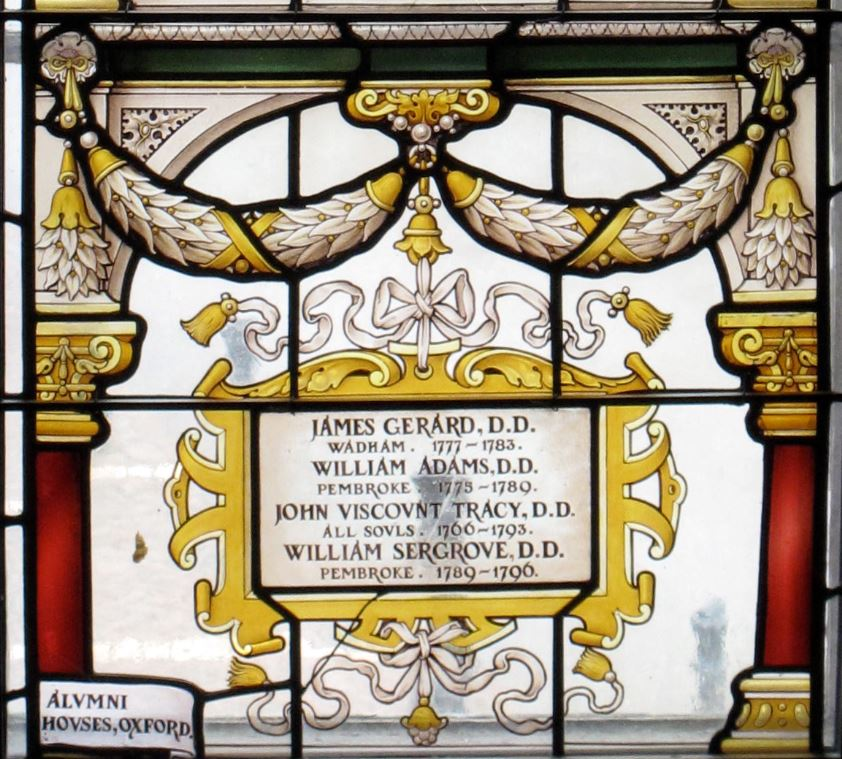
- Stained glass in the Grundy Library at Abingdon School containing the name of James Gerard
- Born: c. 1740
- Died: 14 February 1789

James Gerard (c.1740 – 1789) was an English cleric and Warden of Wadham College, Oxford.

== Education ==
He was educated at John Roysse's Free School in Abingdon, (now Abingdon School) from 1751-1757.

He was Artium Magister (A.M) (13 July 1765), B.D (17 June 1777) and Doctor of Divinity (20 June 1777)

== Career ==
He was the Warden of Wadham College, Oxford from 5 May 1777 until 1783. The warden was the term used by Wadham for the head of the college.

He gained an ecclesiastical preferment as rector of Monks Risborough in 1783. He started his appointment at Monks Risborough on 9 July 1783 on his father's (Joseph Gerard) cession.

== Personal life ==
He married and had one child and his mother was Elizabeth Reynolds.

== See also ==
- List of Old Abingdonians
- List of people associated with Wadham College, Oxford
