= Frederick Augustus Dixey =

British entomologist

Frederick Augustus Dixey, FRS (9 December 1855 – 16 January 1935) was president of the Royal Entomological Society of London, and was a distinguished British entomologist.

Frederick Dixey was educated at Highgate School from 1867 to 1874, and was later a governor of the school from 1920 until his death. He won a scholarship to Wadham College, Oxford, where after starting in optometry, the profession of his father and grandfather, he chose to read medicine. He became a fellow of Wadham and also the sub-warden. He felt drawn to the Church of St Barnabas, Oxford, known for its Anglo-Catholic tradition and ceremonies; he sang in the choir for nearly forty years. Dixey never practised medicine, but devoted himself to natural history. He was in March 1900 nominated to be a curator of the Hope collections at the Oxford University Museum of Natural History. He was an expert on the "white" butterflies, Pieridae.

Dixey was an early supporter of Darwinian evolution who defended natural selection against anti-Darwinians.

Dixey was knocked down and killed by a motorist in 1935, as he attempted to cross the road.

In 1892 Frederick Dixey married Isabel Atkins (1863-1916). Of their sons, Harold Giles Dixey (1893–1974) and Roger Nicholas Dixey (1895-1995 ), Harold, known as Giles, was an assistant master at the Dragon School in Oxford, and a writer.
