= Pamela Clemit =

English scholar, critic and writer (born 1960)

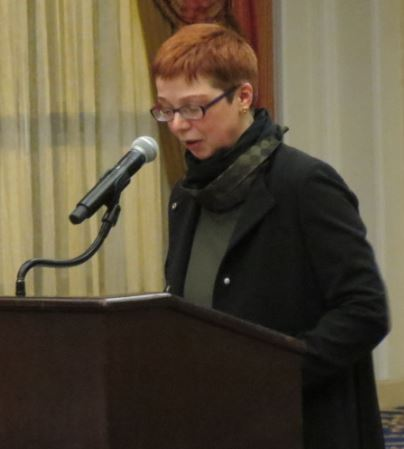
- Pamela Clemit at the Keats-Shelley Association of America Awards Dinner, Philadelphia, 2017
- Born: Northumberland, England
- Education: University of Oxford
- Occupations: Scholar, critic and writer

Pamela Clemit, FRHistS (born 15 April 1960) is a British scholar, critic and writer. She specializes in the eighteenth and nineteenth centuries, and works across the disciplines of literature, history, philosophy and politics. She has particular expertise in the Godwin-Shelley family of writers.

== Biography ==
Pamela Clemit was born at Chathill Railway Station in Northumberland to Albert Edward Clemit, the stationmaster, and his wife Violet (née Rowlands). She was educated at Seahouses County Primary School and the Duchess's Grammar School, Alnwick. She took a first-class B.A. (Hons.) degree in English Language and Literature from Mansfield College, Oxford, from where she also holds an M. Phil. She took a D. Phil in English from St Hugh's College, Oxford.

She taught at Durham University from 1989 to 2015, where she was awarded a Personal Chair in the Department of English in 2005 and held a Christopherson/Knott Foundation Fellowship in 2012-13. She is currently Professor of the Humanities at Queen Mary University of London and a Supernumerary Fellow of Wolfson College, Oxford. She was a member of the inaugural class of Fellows at the New York Public Library's Dorothy and Lewis B. Cullman Center for Scholars and Writers. She has held Visiting Fellowships at, among other places, All Souls College, Oxford; Mansfield College, Oxford; and Wadham College, Oxford.

Clemit works mainly on the two generations of writers and thinkers influenced by the French Revolution in Britain, with a particular focus on the anarchist political philosopher and novelist William Godwin (1756-1836) and his associates. She has produced numerous scholarly and classroom editions of novels, life writing, and other works by Godwin, as well as by Elizabeth Inchbald, Charlotte Smith, and Mary Wollstonecraft Shelley. She is currently editing The Letters of William Godwin, which is being published in six volumes by Oxford University Press. Volume I: 1778-1797, for which she held a Leverhulme Major Research Fellowship, was published in 2011, and Volume II: 1798-1805 in 2014. In 2017 she led a collaborative project to digitize and make publicly available the sole surviving manuscripts of Godwin's principal works, Political Justice (1793) and Caleb Williams (1794), which are held at the Victoria and Albert Museum. Images of the manuscripts are available to view on The Shelley-Godwin Archive. She has written on letter writing as a social practice and on scholarly editing as a mode of historical enquiry. She is a regular reviewer for the Times Literary Supplement and a contributor to Tom Hodgkinson's Idler magazine.

She received the Keats-Shelley Association of America Distinguished Scholar Award for 2016. She is a Fellow of the English Association (2011), and a Fellow of the Royal Historical Society (2019).

== Books and Editions ==
- The Letters of William Godwin, Volume II: 1798-1805 (2014), ed. Pamela Clemit, in The Letters of William Godwin, gen. ed. Pamela Clemit, 6 vols. (2011-).
- The Letters of William Godwin, Volume I: 1778-1797 (2011), ed. Pamela Clemit, in The Letters of William Godwin, gen. ed. Pamela Clemit, 6 vols. (2011-).
- The Cambridge Companion to British Literature of the French Revolution in the 1790s, ed. Pamela Clemit (2011).
- William Godwin, Caleb Williams, ed. Pamela Clemit, Oxford World's Classics (2009).
- 'Life of William Godwin', Poems, Translations, Uncollected Prose, ed. Pamela Clemit and A. A. Markley, Volume IV of Mary Shelley's Literary Lives and Other Writings, gen. ed. Nora Crook, 4 vols., Pickering Masters (2002).
- William Godwin, Memoirs of the Author of a Vindication of the Rights of Woman, ed. Pamela Clemit and Gina Luria Walker, Broadview Literary Texts (2001).
- Godwin, ed. Pamela Clemit, Volume I of Lives of the Great Romantics III: Godwin, Wollstonecraft and Mary Shelley by Their Contemporaries, gen,. ed. John Mullan, 3 vols. (1999).
- Volume II (Matilda, Dramas, Reviews & Essays, Prefaces & Notes); and Volume VII (Falkner), of Novels and Selected Works of Mary Shelley, gen. ed. Nora Crook with Pamela Clemit, 8 vols., Pickering Masters (1996).
- Elizabeth Inchbald, A Simple Story, ed. Pamela Clemit, Penguin Classics (1996).
- William Godwin, St Leon: A Tale of the Sixteenth Century, ed. Pamela Clemit, Oxford World's Classics (1994).
- The Godwinian Novel: The Rational Fictions of Godwin, Brockden Brown, Mary Shelley, Oxford English Monographs (1993, reprinted, 2001).
- Volume V (Educational and Literary Writings) of Political and Philosophical Writings of William Godwin, gen. ed. Mark Philp, 7 vols., Pickering Masters (1993).
- Volume II (Early Novels); Volume III (Caleb Williams); Volume IV (St Leon); Volume V (Fleetwood); Volume VI (Mandeville), of Collected Novels and Memoirs of William Godwin, gen. ed. Mark Philp, 8 vols., Pickering Masters (1992).
