= 2021–2022 United Kingdom censuses =

Census 2021 and Census 2022
- 21 March 2021 and 20 March 2022

General information
- Country: United Kingdom
- Authority: England and Wales: Office for National Statistics; Northern Ireland: Northern Ireland Statistics and Research Agency; Scotland: National Records of Scotland
- Website: England and Wales: census.gov.uk; Northern Ireland: nisra.gov.uk/census; Scotland: scotlandscensus.gov.uk

The 2021–2022 United Kingdom censuses collectively comprised the 23rd census of the United Kingdom.

The censuses of England and Wales, and Northern Ireland took place on 21 March 2021, and the census of Scotland took place later on 20 March 2022. The censuses were administered by the Office for National Statistics (ONS) in England and Wales, by the Northern Ireland Statistics and Research Agency (NISRA) in Northern Ireland, and by the National Records of Scotland in Scotland.

These were the first UK censuses for which most of the data was gathered online. Two of the censuses went ahead despite the COVID-19 pandemic, in part because the information obtained would assist government and public understanding of the pandemic's impact. The census in Scotland was postponed, and took place in 2022.

The censuses in 2021 and 2022 follow on from Beyond 2011, a project by the UK Statistics Authority to assess the value, cost, and alternatives to running a census in England and Wales in 2021. The project recommended an England and Wales census be held in 2021, and that it be conducted predominantly by means of online returns.

Initial results for England and Wales were released on 28 June 2022, while initial results for Scotland were released on 14 September 2023.

== Background ==
An explanation by Mark Drakeford, the First Minister of Wales, on how the census results will help to inform the decisions made in Wales and help to "make Wales a more equal country."

After the 2011 census, both the UK coalition government and the main opposition party, Labour, expressed concerns about the rising costs of the decadal census. There were also concerns about the value of continuing with the traditional approach adopted for the 2011 census. This included whether collection methods were still fit for purpose in a rapidly changing society and whether census outputs, based on a survey conducted every ten years, would continue to meet the increasingly demanding needs of public and private sector users. Emerging technological developments were seen as providing alternative and improved data gathering opportunities. These concerns and opportunities led the UK Government to question if a supplementary or wholly alternative approach to the traditional 10-yearly census was required; more frequent, possibly annual, small-scale surveys could be employed instead.

In 2011, The Beyond 2011 Programme was established to look at alternatives to the traditional census approach. The UK Statistics Authority coordinated the project which was also undertaken by its counterparts in the devolved administrations of Scotland and Northern Ireland.

In 2014, the UK Statistics Authority announced the recommendation from the Beyond 2011 Programme that there should be a decennial-style 2021 census in England and Wales, which in contrast with earlier censuses, would be conducted predominantly through online completion of census forms, supplemented by the further use of administrative and survey data. Existing census gathering methods would be used only as an alternative, where online methods are not feasible. A parallel announcement for Scotland's 2021 census was made by the National Records for Scotland. The ONS Director, Population and Demography Statistics was reported as saying that an estimated 60–65% of household returns would be completed online.

In April 2014, the British House of Commons Public Accounts Committee (PAC) concluded in its report Too soon to scrap the Census, that the 2021 census should go ahead. It had reservations over the lack of investigation into the options for using administrative data and encouraged the UK Government to reassure the public about privacy concerns.

The Minister for the Cabinet Office welcomed the recommendations for a predominantly online 2021 census for England and Wales supplemented by the use of governmental and other administrative data in a letter to the National Statistician in July 2014. He made clear that the Government saw the dual-running decennial national census with administrative data gathering option as a transitional approach and asked the National Statistician to ensure sufficient research is undertaken both prior to and after the 2021 census to find and validate alternative methods to replace the traditional national census and intermediate surveying approach.

=== Legislation ===
Under the Census Act 1920, it is for the United Kingdom Government and Parliament to determine the arrangements for census-taking in England and Wales. Parallel legislative procedures will be required in the devolved administrations of Scotland and Northern Ireland. It would be late 2015 at the earliest before regulations were made. Subject to this legislation being passed the census would be conducted on the same day in England and Wales, Scotland and Northern Ireland to ensure coherence and consistency. There is a legal requirement to complete the 2011 census questionnaire, under the terms of the Census Act 1920. As at 21 March 2021 everyone who had lived or intended to live in the country for three months or more was required to complete a questionnaire. Failure to return a completed questionnaire could lead to a fine and criminal record.

In Scotland, the Census (Amendment) (Scotland) Act 2019 made provisions for voluntary questions about transgender status and sexual orientation to be asked. The Census (Return Particulars and Removal of Penalties) Act 2019 makes the same provision for England and Wales. The sexual orientation question would also be asked in Northern Ireland.

=== Religion ===
The campaign 'If you're not religious, say so!' by Humanists UK aimed to change the wording of the census question on religion. This campaign encouraged non-religious people to tick 'no religion' in order to create a more accurate portrayal of religiousness in the UK. Another campaign by the Climate Census campaign group suggested writing in 'Climate concerned' in response to the religion question, to demand climate action from the government.

=== Legal challenge to 'What is your sex' guidance ===
The Office for National Statistics published an online guidance titled What is your Sex for the 2021 census. The guidance provided that a respondent should answer according to official documents such as their passport. Self-identification is already recognised in some countries. A gender marker on a British passport can be changed in a less formal procedure than acquiring a legally enforceable gender recognition certificate.

In March 2021, Fair Play for Women, an anti-transgender campaign group against self-identification, applied for judicial review in England and Wales and argued that such incidental self-identification should not be allowed in census-taking. In the absence of opposition or intervention from any interested party, the judge ordered an interim revision of the guidance. The government conceded and accepted the order. The ONS withdrew from the High Court proceedings.

Alice Sullivan criticised what she said was the ONS's confusion between the concepts of sex and gender identity. Other academics supported the design of the census questions, for example, on the ground that the transgender population is very small.

==== Position in Scotland ====
In Scotland, similar pieces of guidance have been published since the previous census in 2011. The Scottish Parliament also sought to amend the census Act in 2019 to clarify the meaning of sex in that legislation to include gender identity. The plan was abandoned and changes were instead made in subordinate legislation. In August 2021, National Records of Scotland issued guidelines regarding the sex question in the 2022 Scottish census. The guidance states that "If you are transgender the answer you give can be different from what is on your birth certificate. You do not need a Gender Recognition Certificate (GRC)". The UK Statistics Authority wrote to National Records of Scotland to question the guidelines.

In November 2021, the Murray Blackburn Mackenzie (MBM) policy collective claimed that documents obtained via the Freedom of Information Act showed that the Equality and Human Rights Commission put "extreme external pressure" on Scottish civil servants including chief statistician Roger Halliday to amend their initial proposals.

In December 2021, Fair Play for Women applied for a judicial review in Scotland. Lord Sandison dismissed the case on 17 February 2022 stating that there was "no general rule or principle of law that a question as to a person's sex may only properly be answered by reference to the sex stated on that person's birth certificate or GRC".

Census 2021
- Area: England and Wales
- Registrar: Professor Sir Ian Diamond (as National Statistician)
- Census day(s): 21 March 2021
- Issuing organisation: ONS
- Data supplier: Leidos Innovations
- Rehearsal: September – December 2019.
- Rehearsal Areas: Carlisle, Ceredigion, Hackney, Tower Hamlets
- Census forms: Household and others

An appeal by Fair Play for Women was refused by the Inner House of the Court of Session.

=== Coordination ===
The UK Statistics Authority has the responsibility for coordinating the census arrangements across the United Kingdom through the Office for National Statistics (ONS), which is also responsible for the census in England and Wales.

=== 2021 census research ===
The 2011 UK census was the first decennial census in the United Kingdom to include the option of completing the census documentation online. Across the UK between 15 and 19% of census forms were submitted online. The UK Statistics Authority proposed that the 2021 census should be conducted predominantly online (with support provided for those unable to complete the census online), supplemented by the use of administrative and survey data and improve annual statistics between censuses. For the census in 2021 the proposed target for online completion has been set to at least 65%.

Research has been under way since 2011 to design a new census methodology which maximises the success of an online approach.

Research commissioned by the Beyond 2011 programme identified that there were risks associated with over-reliance on administrative data drawn from governmental department sources due to process changes, such as benefits and welfare payments and the necessity to include full access to statistical data as part as proposed legislation affecting administrative programmes. Issues identified also included the accuracy of administrative data sets for geographical areas below that of local authorities, problems associated with estimation and the use of address registers. ONS on behalf of the UK Statistics Authority has taken on board the recommendations of the Skinner Report into methodology work and has proposed three research strands to determine the 'optimum blend' of online census, administrative data and surveying methods for the 2021 census and indeed subsequent censuses.

The UK Statistics Authority has commissioned research strands as part of a census transformation programme which was due to report by 2017 relating to the 2021 census operation, the shape of population statistics in 2021, and the shape of population statistics beyond 2021 in the lead up to 2031.

=== Census work programme ===
A work programme running until 2024, comprising eight phases, was developed by ONS.

1. Research (ended March 2015)
2. Design and prototyping (ended December 2016)
3. Testing (2017)
4. Development (2018)
5. Rehearsal (January 2019 – June 2020)
6. Collection operations (July 2020 – December 2021)
7. Analysis, output and dissemination (2022–23)
8. Evaluation / future planning (2023–24)

Alongside this programme trials of statistics generation using administrative data were planned starting from the autumn of 2015 and running through to 2021 with the aim of ranging across the breadth, detail and accuracy of census outputs.

=== Production ===
The contract for preparing, dispatching up to 16 million paper questionnaire packs (for anyone who did not want to, or could not access the census online), and then securely managing, capturing and digitising the responses was awarded to Leidos Innovations UK. The contract was estimated to be worth around £65.1m. The parent company of Leidos Innovations UK, Leidos (an American defence, aviation, information technology, and biomedical research company), merged with Lockheed Martin's IT sector in August 2016. Lockheed Martin UK was awarded the contract for the census in 2011. Adecco UK was contracted by ONS to recruit, train and administer the pay for the 30,000 temporary ONS workers who would be working as field staff for the 2021 census.

=== Changes from 2011 census ===
The general style of the questionnaire was similar to that of the 2011 census, although there were some new questions for 2021:

- Are the respondents ex-armed forces?
- Voluntary question for 16 and over about sexual orientation.
- Voluntary question for 16 and over: Is the gender you identify with the same as your sex registered at birth? This is in addition to the compulsory question about respondents' sex.

=== Advertising ===
An advertising campaign (made under contract by M&C Saatchi) was launched under the slogan of "it's about us" at the start of 2021. Television adverts tried to show a diverse range of people in various locations in England and Wales in front of a purple fabric screen, with a cover version of The Zombies' "This Will Be Our Year", performed by Jose McGill & The Vagaband, featuring as the advert soundtrack.

== 2021 census for Northern Ireland ==
Census 2021
- Area: Northern Ireland
- Registrar: Siobhán Carey
- Census day(s): 21 March 2021
- Issuing organisation: NISRA
- Data supplier: Leidos Innovations
- Rehearsal: 13 October 2019
- Rehearsal Areas: Ravenhill and Queens (Belfast); Armagh, Banbridge and Craigavon (Craigavon); Fermanagh and Omagh (West Fermanagh)
- Census forms: Household, individual, and others
- Website: https://census.gov.uk/ni/

The Northern Ireland Statistics and Research Agency (NISRA) undertakes the census in Northern Ireland.

The NISRA has published a report reviewing the 2011 census and other online-orientated censuses abroad and identified the importance of such things as pre-census publicity, the use of a unique internet code or ePin, and a coordinated promotion and follow up process during the census completion period.

== 2022 census for Scotland ==
Census 2022

- Area: Scotland
- Registrar: Tim Ellis (as Registrar General, Scotland)
- Census day(s): 20 March 2022
- Issuing organisation: NRS
- Data supplier: TBC
- Rehearsal Areas: Dumfries and Galloway, Glasgow City, Whole of Na h-Eileanan Siar
- Census forms: Household, and others
- Website: https://www.scotlandscensus.gov.uk/2022

The National Records of Scotland (NRS) is responsible for the census in Scotland. A rehearsal was conducted on 7 October 2019 and closed for returns on 7 November 2019 in three local authority areas: parts of Glasgow City, Dumfries and Galloway and Na h-Eileanan Siar.

The census was scheduled to take place on 21 March 2021, but was delayed in July 2020 by the Scottish Government because of the COVID-19 pandemic.

The Scottish Government has come under criticism for the way the census has been conducted, with some news outlets describing the results as being "botched" due to record low turnout rates and failing to meet the set target return rate of 94%. Initial turnout rates for the census in Scotland concluded with 79% return rate; an additional round of extension to filling out the census was granted to encourage returns, raising the return rate percentage to 89%. The return rate for comparison in England and Wales was 97%. However national statistician Ian Diamond has said that despite not meeting the target, the census could still provide "really good data". The additional round of extension cost the Scottish Government an additional £6m, and £148m in total.

== Censuses in Crown Dependencies ==
Although it is a Crown Dependency and not part of the United Kingdom, Jersey carried out a census on the same day as the 2021 censuses in England and Wales, and Northern Ireland.

Guernsey no longer carries out a decennial census, instead using the Rolling Electronic Census Project to produce regular census reports.

The Isle of Man also undertook a full census in 2021 (having held an interim census in 2016).

== Results ==
=== England and Wales ===
Initial results, released in June 2022, showed the recorded population of England and Wales to be 59,597,300 (56,489,800 in England and 3,107,500 in Wales), a rise of 6.3% or 3.5 million people over the previous decade. This was the largest population ever recorded through a census in England and Wales, and the overall population of the United Kingdom was estimated to be 67 million. The census also showed that the population of the two countries, aged 65 and over, had surpassed the number of children aged 15 and under for the first time, with 11.1 million people aged 65 and over compared with 10.4 million aged under 15.

Results of the question on religion were published on 29 November 2022. The question was voluntary but was answered by 94.0% of the population of England and Wales. 46.2% of the population described themselves as "Christian", 6.5% as "Muslim", and 1.7% as "Hindu". 37.2% of the population asserted that they had "no religion". In Wales, there were more people declaring that they had "no religion" (47%) than those affirming a Christian identity or any other religion.

==== Results on sexual orientation and gender identity ====
Results on sexual orientation and gender identity questions were released on 6 January 2023. Similarly to the religion question, this question was voluntary but was answered by 92.5% of the population of England and Wales. 89.4% of the population described themselves as straight or heterosexual, 1.5% described themselves as "Gay or lesbian", 1.3% as "Bisexual" and 0.3% were described as having "[an]other sexual orientation" (with the most common being pansexual, asexual and queer). The remaining 7.5% did not answer. 0.5% answered 'No' to the census question 'Is the gender you identify with the same as your sex registered at birth?' Alice Sullivan, professor of sociology at University College London, reported that in the 16 to 24 age group, 1% answered 'No' to the question. She said that females were more likely than males to answer 'No' in that age group, whereas in other age groups females were more likely to answer 'Yes'.

In April 2023, when more granular data became available, Michael Biggs, professor of sociology at the University of Oxford, complained about what he perceived to be anomalies in the data on the 0.5% who identified as transgender, when disaggregated by local authority and other factors. He questioned whether the ONS had adequately tested the gender identity question with respondents for whom English is a second language. Biggs said that according to his analysis of the data, overall, people from an immigrant background, who do not speak English as their first language, were found to be five times more likely to be recorded as transgender and 1 in 67 Muslims were recorded as transgender, which he said was "not plausible".

The Office for Statistics Regulation (OSR), which oversees the ONS, began an examination of Biggs' concerns about the statistics, including the reported result that 262,000 identify as transgender in England and Wales. Biggs said: "I'm 99 per cent sure that misinterpretation has had a significant impact in inflating the numbers." The ONS said that "while the question on gender identity was tested thoroughly, it is possible that individual responses were affected by different interpretations of the question."

In September 2023, reporting initial findings of the OSR investigation, its head Ed Humpherson wrote of the ONS team responsible for "quality assurance": "with more time to look at all combinations of variables, for example looking at gender identity and ethnicity, it may have identified areas for additional probing and analysis." Humpherson added, "The communication of uncertainty should be strengthened". An anonymous government source said they believed the number 260,000 of transgender people was "hugely overstated".

In September 2024, the OSR removed official accreditation of the gender identity statistics, classifying them instead as official statistics in development.

=== Northern Ireland ===
Results for Northern Ireland were published by the Northern Ireland Statistics and Research Agency in Spring 2023.

=== Scotland ===
National Records of Scotland published the first results on 14 September 2023. The results showed that Scotland's population was 5,436,600, the highest figure on record but a slower rate of population growth, 2.7% since 2011, than the previous growth of 4.6%. The first results, in May 2024, were population estimates at output areas, as well as topical data about ethnic group, national identity, language and religion. The rest of the data was published across 2024 and into 2025. The low response rates (88%) compared with the rest of the UK mean that the data is only partial so does not fully reflect the state of Scotland's demographics.

==== Households ====
The census showed there were 2,509,300 households in Scotland with at least one usual resident. This was an increase of 136,500 (5.8%) from the 2011 census. There were some 930,000 single person households in Scotland and over a third of all households were single person (37.1%).

==== Migration ====
The census revealed that over half a million people living in Scotland were born in the rest of the UK (563,500). Furthermore, that a further half a million were born outside of the UK (554,900). The number of people born outside of the UK had increased by 185,600 since 2011.

==== Age ====
The census showed the population as ageing, with over one million people aged 65 and over (1,091,000). The number of people under 15 was only 832,300.

==== Religion ====
The majority of people said they had no religion. In 2022, 51.1% of people had no religion, up from 36.7% in 2011. Of those who were religious in 2022, 20.4% responded ‘Church of Scotland', 13.3% ‘Roman Catholic’, 5.1% 'Other Christian' and 2.2% 'Muslim'. Among those who selected 'Other Christian,' 72,359 people identified as Anglican or Episcopalian.

==== Ethnicity ====
In 2022 the census results showed 12.9% of people in Scotland had a minority ethnic background. This is an increase from 8.2% in 2011. 77.7% described themselves as 'Scottish', 9.4% as 'Other British'. The next three largest groups were 'Other White' (2.92%), 'Polish' (1.67%) and 'Pakistani' (1.34%).

== See also ==
- Census in the United Kingdom
- Demographics of the United Kingdom
