= Athena SWAN =

British university accreditation scheme promoting gender equality

Athena Swan (Scientific Women's Academic Network) Charter
- Created: 2005
- Commissioned by: Equality Challenge Unit
- Subject: Award for organisations
- Purpose: Recognises organisations' commitment to, and progress on, equality and diversity, particularly race and gender

The Athena SWAN Charter (Scientific Women's Academic Network) is an equality charter mark framework and accreditation scheme for higher education and research institutions, established in 2005 by the UK's Equality Challenge Unit (now part of Advance HE). It recognises and promotes commitment to advancing gender equality, particularly in relation to representation, career progression, and success for women. The charter is used both as a self-assessment and benchmarking tool to guide institutional change.

== Award details ==
Members (universities) who sign up to the charter are expected to apply for an Athena SWAN award, at Bronze, Silver or Gold level. Each award is valid for four years under the post-2015 rules (three years where pre-2015 rules apply).

They commit to adopting ten principles, which focus on promoting and supporting gender equality for women. These are:

- We acknowledge that academia cannot reach its full potential unless it can benefit from the talents of all.
- We commit to advancing gender equality in academia, in particular, addressing the loss of women across the career pipeline and the absence of women from senior academic, professional and support roles.
- We commit to addressing unequal gender representation across academic disciplines and professional and support functions. In this we recognise disciplinary differences including:
  - the relative underrepresentation of women in senior roles in arts, humanities, social sciences, business and law (AHSSBL)
  - the particularly high loss rate of women in science, technology, engineering, mathematics and medicine (STEMM)
- We commit to tackling the gender pay gap.
- We commit to removing the obstacles faced by women, in particular, at major points of career development and progression including the transition from PhD into a sustainable academic career.
- We commit to addressing the negative consequences of using short-term contracts for the retention and progression of staff in academia, particularly women.
- We commit to tackling the discriminatory treatment often experienced by trans people.
- We acknowledge that advancing gender equality demands commitment and action from all levels of the organisation and in particular active leadership from those in senior roles.
- We commit to making and mainstreaming sustainable structural and cultural changes to advance gender equality, recognising that initiatives and actions that support individuals alone will not sufficiently advance equality.
- All individuals have identities shaped by several different factors. We commit to considering the intersection of gender and other factors wherever possible.

The ten principles have been criticised for failing to mention collective bargaining, for failing to address unconscious bias in paying "market" rates of pay, and failing to address the sex discrimination inherent in child care rights to paid leave and the lasting negative impact this has on relative career advancement for those taking long maternity and short paternity leave. It has also been found that "there is no evidence that Athena SWAN membership and award level have any impact" on "the gender pay gap and the proportion of women in the top quartile of pay".

== History ==
The Athena SWAN charter was established in 2005 and the first awards were conferred in 2006. The initial charter set out to encourage and recognise commitment to advancing the careers of women in science, technology, engineering, mathematics, and medicine (STEMM) institutions of higher education and research. In 2011, the UK Chief Medical Officer made it a requirement for academic departments applying for funding from the National Institute for Health Research to hold the Athena SWAN silver award. This requirement was removed in 2020.

In May 2015 the charter was expanded to include non-STEMM departments including arts, humanities, social sciences, business, and law. Additionally, it expanded to cover additional communities including professional and support staff, technical staff, as well as transgender staff and students. The first awards to non-STEMM university departments were announced in April 2016. The new charter recognises work undertaken to address gender equality more broadly, and not just barriers to progression that affect women.

== Reception ==
An exploratory study of women's and men's perceptions of Athena SWAN in 2017 was broadly positive, and highlighted the significance of government funding being linked to Athena SWAN awards; it also highlighted the limitations of the process to change long-standing and entrenched issues in society. A 2019 study of the university culture in medical and social sciences attributed a more positive culture in medical sciences to the widespread implementation of Athena SWAN gender equality action plans, linked to the funding incentives of the National Institute for Health Research (NIHR). A 2020 study examining the effect of Athena SWAN funding incentives on women's research leadership in NIHR Biomedical Research Centres found a rise in the number of women in mid-level leadership positions and the proportion of funding going to women.

According to empirical research carried out at the University of Bath, "there is no evidence that Athena SWAN membership and award level have any impact" on "the gender pay gap and the proportion of women in the top quartile of pay". Some commentators consider it to be largely window-dressing with little impact on lived experiences of women working in universities. Others have indicated an apparent failure to find any significant impact of Athena SWAN awards on changes in the proportion of women in senior leadership positions or professorial posts based on data held be the Higher Education Statistics Agency (HESA) for consecutive years between 2012 and 2019.

The Athena SWAN charter is now used by some institutions in conjunction with the Race Equality charter and issues of gender and race inequality become conflated.

In November 2021, The Times reported concerns about the Athena SWAN programme; barrister Naomi Cunningham described it as "totalitarian and unlawful" while historian Selina Todd, in a letter to the editor, said it "promotes a controversial view of sex and gender". Within the Irish context in particular (see below), it has been suggested that institutional commitment to the charter poses a risk to academic freedom. John Armstrong and Alice Sullivan have argued that 'policy-scoring schemes' such as this can lead to groupthink and pose risks to academic freedom.

A 2020 cohort study found that Athena SWAN members showed greater and faster growth in female representation in managerial leadership. A review of the scheme published in 2025 by policy group Murray Blackburn Mackenzie highlighted a lack of evidence that the scheme has been effective as a mechanism for addressing sex inequalities in promotion or pay.

== International ==
=== Australia ===
An Australian pilot of the Charter began in 2015 and is overseen by SAGE Ltd., a not-for-profit company created from a partnership of the Australian Academy of Science and the Australian Academy of Technology and Engineering.

=== Ireland ===
In 2015 the Charter entered Irish higher education. In Ireland, the charter is supported by the Higher Education Authority through its Centre of Excellence for Equality, Diversity and Inclusion, and by an Athena Swan National Committee with representatives from higher education institutions, Advance HE, Irish research agencies, the Irish Universities Association and the Technological Higher Education Association.

The 2021 Athena Swan Ireland charter framework supports higher education institutions, academic departments and professional units in gender equality work and evidence-based equality work across the equality grounds set out in Irish legislation. As of the April 2025 assessment round, there were 148 Athena Swan Ireland award holders, comprising 120 Bronze awards and 28 Silver awards.

== Influence ==
Despite being in its nascent stage, research into the effects of the Charter on the careers of women indicates a positive impact on gender diversity among both managerial leaders and non-managerial academics, as well as female research leaders. The latter is attributed to the introduction of Athena SWAN research funding incentives, which promote research and leadership opportunities for women. These improvements are not ubiquitous across all academic disciplines, and Charter-induced interventions may take some time to produce tangible results, as the influence of diversity charters follows a trajectory of maturity.

=== USA ===
In 2017 Advance HE supported the American Association for the Advancement of Science in introducing a pilot scheme called STEM Equity Achievement (SEA) Change programme. SEA Change borrows from Athena SWAN but is broader in scope.

=== Canada ===
In 2018 Canada introduced the Dimensions pilot programme. Supported by Advance HE, Dimensions aims to draw on the Athena SWAN methodology to recognise institutions that are inclusive of underrepresented groups.

== See also ==
- Equal opportunity
- Gender equality
- Gender inequality
- Gender studies
- Women's empowerment
- UK labour law
