= 2011 United Kingdom census =

Census 2011
- 27 March 2011

General information
- Country: United Kingdom of Great Britain and Northern Ireland
- Authority: Office for National Statistics (England and Wales); General Register Office for Scotland (Scotland); Northern Ireland Statistics and Research Agency (Northern Ireland)
- Website: ONS (England and Wales); Scotland's Census; NISRA (Northern Ireland)

A census of the population of the United Kingdom is taken every ten years. The 2011 census was held in all countries of the UK on 27 March 2011. It was the first UK census which could be completed online via the Internet. The Office for National Statistics (ONS) is responsible for the census in England and Wales, the General Register Office for Scotland (GROS) is responsible for the census in Scotland, and the Northern Ireland Statistics and Research Agency (NISRA) is responsible for the census in Northern Ireland.

The Office for National Statistics is the executive office of the UK Statistics Authority, a non-ministerial department formed in 2008 and which reports directly to Parliament. ONS is the UK Government's single largest statistical producer of independent statistics on the UK's economy and society, used to assist the planning and allocation of resources, policy-making and decision-making. ONS designs, manages and runs the census in England and Wales. In its capacity as the national statistics office for the United Kingdom, ONS also compiles and releases census tables for the United Kingdom when the data from England and Wales, Scotland and Northern Ireland are complete.

In the run-up to the census both the main UK political parties expressed concerns about the increasing cost and the value for money of the census, and it was suggested that the 2011 census might be the last decennial census to be taken.

The first results from the 2011 census, age and sex, and occupied households estimates for England and Wales and Northern Ireland, were released on 16 July 2012. The first results for Scotland, and the first UK-wide results, were published on 17 December 2012. More detailed and specialised data were published from 2013.

== Background ==
=== History ===
The Registrar General John Rickman conducted the first census of Great Britain's population, and was responsible for the ten-yearly reports published between 1801 and 1831. During the first 100 years of census-taking the population of England and Wales grew more than threefold, to around 32 million, and that of Scotland, where a separate census has been carried out since 1861, to about 4.5 million.

From 1911 onwards rapid social change, scientific breakthroughs, and major world events affected the structure of the population. A fire that destroyed census records in 1931, and the declaration of war in 1939, made the 1951 census hugely significant in recording 30 years of change over one of the most turbulent periods in British history.

The 1971 census was run by the newly created Office of Population Censuses and Surveys (OPCS), a body formed by the merger of the General Register Office and Government Social Survey. In 1996 the Office for National Statistics (ONS) was formed by merging the Central Statistical Office (CSO), OPCS and the statistics division of the Department of Employment; the first census it ran was in 2001. In 2008 the UK Statistics Authority was established as an independent body.

=== Purpose ===
A population census is a key instrument for assessing the needs of local communities. When related to other data sources such as housing or agricultural censuses, or sample surveys, the data becomes even more useful. Most countries of the world take censuses: the United Nations recommends that countries take a census at least once every ten years. Twenty-one out of 40 countries in Europe are engaged in the 2010–2011 census round The design for the 2011 census reflected changes in society since 2001 and asked questions to help paint a detailed demographic picture of England and Wales, as it stood on census day, 27 March 2011.

Data collected by the census is used to provide statistical outputs which central government uses to plan and allocate local authority services funding, and which local authorities themselves use to identify and meet the needs of their local communities. Other organisations that use census data include healthcare organisations, community groups, researchers and businesses. The questionnaires, including people's personal information, are kept confidential for 100 years before being released to the public, providing an important source of information for historical, demographic and genealogy research.

== 2011 census for England and Wales ==
Census 2011
- Area: England and Wales
- Registrar: Jil Matheson (as National Statistician)
- Census day(s): 27 March 2011
- Issuing organisation: ONS
- Data supplier: Lockheed Martin UK
- Rehearsal: 11 October 2009
- Rehearsal Areas: Lancaster, Newham, Anglesey
- Census forms: Household and others
- 1st release: Jul 2012 – Nov 2012
- 2nd release: Dec 2012 – Feb 2013
- 3rd release: Mar 2013 – Jun 2013
- 4th release: Jul 2013 – Oct 2013
- Website: ,

=== Operation ===
The 2011 census for England and Wales included around 25 million households. Questionnaires were posted out to all households, using a national address register compiled by the Office for National Statistics (ONS) with the help of local authorities through comparisons of the National Land and Property Gazetteer (NLPG) and the Royal Mail and Ordnance Survey national address products.

People could complete and submit their questionnaire online, or fill it in on paper and post it back in a pre-addressed envelope. Guidance was provided online and through the census helpline. Completed questionnaires were electronically tracked and field staff followed up with households that did not return a questionnaire. Special arrangements were made to count people living in communal establishments such as; boarding schools, prisons, military bases, hospitals, care homes, student halls of residence, hotels, royal apartments and embassies, as well as for particular communities; rough sleepers, travellers and those living on waterways. In these cases field staff delivered and collected questionnaires and, where needed, provided advice or assistance in completing the questionnaire.

There was a legal requirement to complete the 2011 census questionnaire, under the terms of the Census Act 1920. As at 27 March 2011 everyone who had lived or intended to live in the country for three months or more was required to complete a questionnaire. Failure to return a completed questionnaire could lead to a fine and criminal record.

=== Production ===
Front page of the 2011 census form.

Lockheed Martin UK, the UK arm of US-based aerospace, defence, security, and technology company Lockheed Martin was awarded the contract to provide services for the census comprising questionnaire printing, a customer contact centre and data capture and processing. The contract was valued at £150 million, approximately one third of the total £482 million census budget.

Concerns were raised during contract negotiations that the US PATRIOT Act could be used to force Lockheed Martin to reveal census data to US authorities. The Cabinet Office state that Lockheed Martin will "develop the systems" used to process census data, but that "in essence ... neither Lockheed Martin UK nor any Lockheed Martin employee will have access to personal Census data." The Office for National Statistics stated that no personal census information will ever leave the UK or be seen by any American-owned company.

Several groups called for a boycott of the census over the involvement of Lockheed Martin, including the Stop the War Coalition, and the Christian thinktank Ekklesia. The groups were concerned about sharing data with a company involved in surveillance and data processing for the CIA and FBI; and also providing funding to an arms company making nuclear missiles and cluster bombs. The Green Party also objected, and campaigned unsuccessfully to stop Lockheed Martin getting the contract, although no decision was made about whether or not to call for a boycott. The Census Alert campaign group also decided against calling for a boycott.

Liberal Conspiracy said a boycott would be counter-productive, as the census is used to distribute funding to local services. Liberal Conspiracy reports that a council may lose £22,000 over 10 years for each person who does not complete the census.

The census for England and Wales was trialled in 135,000 households in Lancaster, the London Borough of Newham and Anglesey on 11 October 2009. A test was also carried out in Birmingham at the same time. The questions for the 2011 census were the same as those trialled in the 2009 Census Rehearsal. The Order for the 2011 Census (including the proposed question topics, census date and who should complete the questionnaire) was laid before Parliament in October 2009 and was approved by Parliament and became law in December 2009.

Capita Group was contracted by ONS to recruit, train and administer the pay for the 35,000 temporary ONS workers who worked as field staff for the 2011 census.

=== Costs and value for money ===
The total cost of the 2011 census in England and Wales over the period from 2004/05 to 2015/16 is estimated to be £482 million. This is more than twice the £210m spent on the 2001 census. This breaks down to a cost of 87 pence per person, per year (over the life of the census – ten years). "The cost equates to about 87p a year per person, demonstrating excellent value for money. The per capita costs in the UK are less than for many other European countries that carry out similar censuses. In summary, this census will meet crucial requirements for statistical information that Government and others cannot do without." Minister of State, Cabinet Office (Angela E. Smith).

Both the main UK political parties had expressed concerns about the rising costs and value of a ten-yearly census, and on coming into office the UK coalition government had gone as far as suggesting that the 2011 census might be the last of its kind. In July 2010 the UK government asked ONS to explore other methods of measuring the population. In 2011 the three national statistics bodies, ONS, GROS and NISRA set up a co-ordinated research project known as Beyond 2011. The objectives of the programme were to assess the feasibility of improving UK population statistics using integrated data sources to replace or complement existing approaches, and whether alternative data sources could provide the priority statistics on the characteristics of small populations typically provided by a census. The project reported its findings in March 2014 and recommended that a UK-wide census in 2021 should take place, and that better use should be made of other demographic data sources.

=== Changes from 2001 census ===
The general style of the questionnaire was similar to that of the 2001 census. A rehearsal questionnaire was released in 2009. Several new identity and status options were included for the first time. Other changes for 2011 included:

- An option to complete the form online.
- The 2011 census questionnaire included 56 questions in total.
- It asked immigrants their date of arrival and how long they intended to stay in the UK.
- This was the first census since the Civil Partnership Act 2004; the questionnaire included tick boxes for same-sex civil partnerships in relevant questions. The Equality and Human Rights Commission had called for a question to be included regarding respondents' sexual orientation. While the 2011 census does not ask about sexual orientation or identity, a question on sexual identity was introduced to all ONS social surveys in January 2009 to support the Equality Act (Sexual Orientation) Regulations 2007.
- English, Northern Irish, Scottish and Welsh national identity tick-box option has been included following criticism that English and Welsh were absent from 2001.
- A question about the number of bedrooms a household has, as well as the names, gender and birth dates of any overnight guests.
- A question asking how well a respondent could speak English.
- Unlike the 2001 census, there was no question on whether a resident has access to a bath or shower.
- The section on ethnicity was expanded to include a "Gypsy or Irish Traveller" tick-box under the "White" heading and an "Arab" tick-box under the "Other ethnic group" heading, whilst Chinese was merged into the "Asian British" category, which formerly only included South Asian ethnic groups.
- The questionnaire for the 2001 census only included usual residents. For the 2011 census it also included visitors staying in the UK on the night of 27 March 2011, census day.

In 2001 only 38 people were reported to have been prosecuted for refusing to complete a questionnaire. In 2011 those who refused to complete the census questionnaire or included false information could face a fine of up to £1,000. A team of compliance staff were recruited to follow up by visiting those householders who refused to complete a questionnaire or where their questionnaire was not returned or completed correctly.

=== Advertising ===
Advertising promoted the notion of how the UK 2011 census would help to shape Britain's future in areas such as healthcare and education. TV adverts, for example, depicted Origami, in census colours, forming objects including school computers and buses. A short sentence under the census logo informed the viewer that the census was a duty that must be undertaken. From 7 April 2011 advertising focused on reminding people to complete and return by post or submit online.

=== Controversy ===
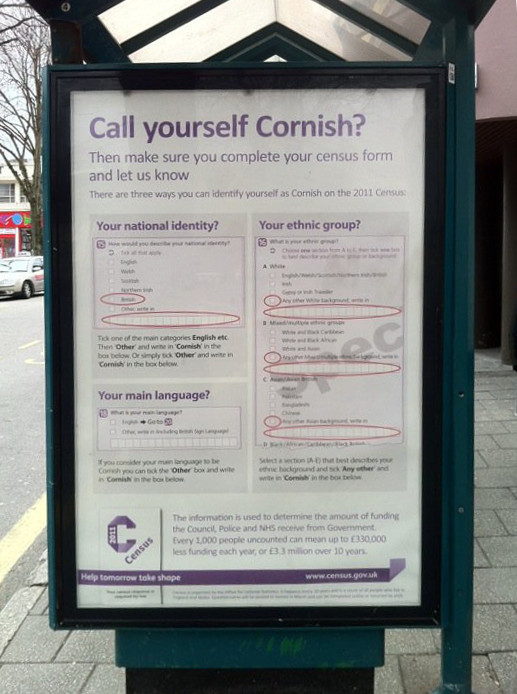
An advert in Cornwall telling people how to describe their ethnicity and national identity as Cornish.

A question about the number of bedrooms a household has, as well as the names, gender and birth dates of any overnight guests was criticised as "bedroom snooping" by the Conservative Party in opposition.

In a written answer in response to a question on population and the traditional enumeration methodology of the 2011 census, Cabinet Office minister Francis Maude said:

The UK Statistics Authority is responsible for carrying out the census in England and Wales. The board of the authority has expressed the view that the 2011 census should be the last conduction on the traditional basis. Through the 'Beyond 2011' project the authority has been considering alternative ways of obtaining information that has been traditionally gathered via a census.

The current advice from the ONS is clear. Census alternatives are not sufficiently developed to provide now the information required to meet essential UK and EU requirements. It is therefore important that the census goes ahead in England and Wales on 27 March 2011. ONS must do all it can to ensure it is a success.

Although some 37,000 people recorded their identity as Cornish by manually writing it on the form in the 2001 census, no tick-box was provided in 2011 to select Cornish as a White British national identity, despite campaigns. As a consequence, posters were created by the census organisation and Cornwall Council which advised residents of how they could identify themselves as Cornish by writing it in the ethnicity, national identity and main language sections. Additionally, people could record Cornwall as their country of birth.

During the consultation on the 2011 census the British Humanist Association raised several concerns about question 20, "What is your religion?". The BHA argued it was a leading question, and suggested that it should be phrased as two questions, "Do you have a religion?" and "If so, what is it?". It contended that by placing the religion question near the ethnicity question it would encourage some responders to associate religion with cultural identity. The BHA also ran adverts during March 2011 encouraging the use of the 'no religion' box in the questionnaire.

== 2011 census for Northern Ireland ==
Census 2011
- Area: Northern Ireland
- Registrar: T N Caven (as Registrar General, Northern Ireland)
- Census day(s): 27 March 2011
- Issuing organisation: NISRA
- Data supplier: Lockheed Martin UK
- Rehearsal: 11 October 2009
- Rehearsal Areas: Derriaghy and Moy & Benburb
- Census forms: Household, Individual, and others
- 1st release: Jul 2012 – Sep 2012
- 2nd release: Dec 2012 – Feb 2013
- 3rd release: Mar 2013 – Jun 2013
- 4th release: Jul 2013 – Oct 2013
- Website: ,

The 2011 census for Northern Ireland had 59 questions in total. 14 were about the household and its accommodation and 45 questions were for each individual member of the household to complete.

The rehearsal was held on Sunday 11 October 2009 in two areas, Derriaghy and Moy & Benburb, covering approximately 5,000 households.

The 2011 census for Northern Ireland costing around £21.8 million over the six-year period 2008–2014. Over the ten-year cycle the cost is expected to be about £25 million.

== 2011 census for Scotland ==
Census 2011
- Area: Scotland
- Registrar: Duncan Macniven (as Registrar General, Scotland)
- Census day(s): 27 March 2011
- Issuing organisation: GROS, now part of NRS
- Data supplier: CACI
- Rehearsal: 29 March 2009
- Rehearsal Areas: west Edinburgh, Lewis and Harris
- Census forms: Household, and others
- 1st release: Dec 2012 – May 2013
- 2nd release: Summer 2013
- 3rd release: Autumn 2013
- 4th release: Winter 2013
- Website: ,

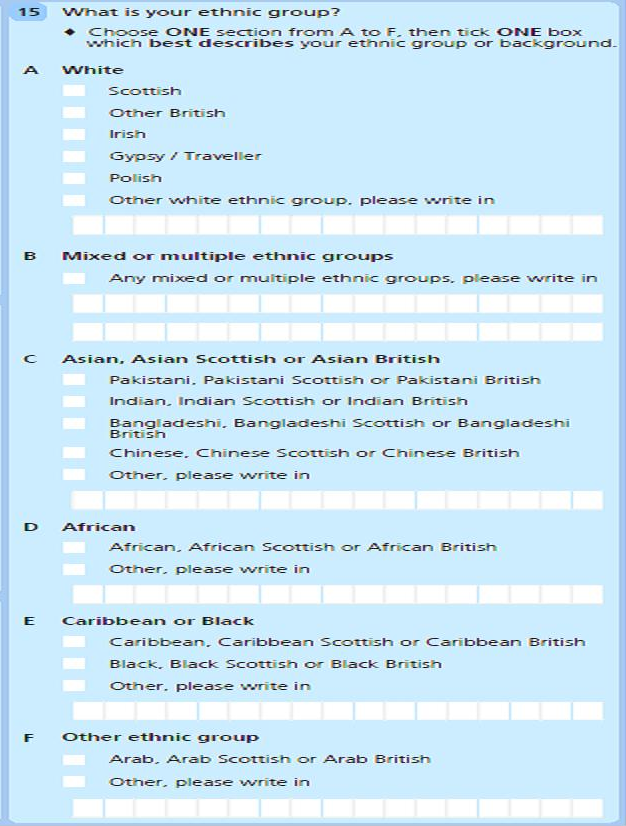
The ethnic group question used in the 2011 census in Scotland.

In Scotland, a wholly owned subsidiary of information technology company CACI was contracted to gather information. CACI "provided interrogators who worked at Abu Ghraib prison at the height of the prisoner abuse scandal".

The 2011 Scotland census asked 13 household questions and up to 35 questions for each individual. Plans were rehearsed in west Edinburgh and Lewis and Harris.

The 2011 census was the first to include a question asking about the ability to read, write and understand the Scots language alongside the question for ability in Scottish Gaelic and English languages.

== Release plans for 2011 census statistics ==
Responsibility for the release of data from the 2011 census is split between the Office for National Statistics (ONS) for England and Wales, the General Register Office for Scotland (GROS) for Scotland and the Northern Ireland Statistics and Research Agency (NISRA). The ONS announced in March the release plan for the results of the 2011 census which stated in July 2012. NISRA made a similar announcement with identical release plan. In June 2012 GROS advised on its release plan which commences in December 2012. The releases will comprise data sets enabling the standard comparison with previous census data reports as well as over a hundred new data sets based on the new questions asked in the 2011 census.

=== Prospectuses ===
NISRA, ONS and GROS each publish a schedule stating what documents they will release and when. Those documents are called a "prospectus". Each prospectus is not fixed, but changes as schedules are changed or documents are late. The prospectuses are linked to in the table below.

Area	Issuing authority current prospectus and release plans
United Kingdom	Office for National Statistics (ONS) – UK Wide Census Releases
England and Wales	Office for National Statistics (ONS) – England and Wales Census Releases
Scotland	General Registrar Office for Scotland (GROS) – Scotland 2011 Census Releases
Northern Ireland	Northern Ireland Statistics and Research Authority (NISRA) – Northern Ireland 2011 Census Releases

=== Release schedules ===
Data release schedule for United Kingdom 2011 census data

The Office for National Statistics is responsible for publishing United Kingdom wide 2011 census data. These are co-ordinated releases coinciding with data published by the three national statistical authorities.

==== Release 1.1: (17 December 2012) ====
Population data including data for males and females for the United Kingdom and revised estimates England, Northern Ireland, Scotland and Wales.

==== Release 1.2: (21 March 2013) ====
Population numbers (rounded), by five-year age bands, sex and densities and household sata at national and local authority level.

==== Release 1.3: (31 July 2013) ====
Population estimates (unrounded) by single year of age and sex for the UK and all local authorities (or equivalent) in the UK, along with UK historic population pyramids (1951–2011).

==== Release 2.1 (11 October 2013) ====
Key and Quick statistics Part 1 – Census Profiles; Population, People and Places, Health and Social Care, Travel and Transport. National and Local Authority geographies.

==== Release 2.2 (4 December 2013) ====
Key and Quick statistics Part 2 – Census Profiles; Qualifications and Labour Market. National and Local Authority geographies.

==== Release 2.3 (23 January 2014) ====
Key and Quick statistics Part 3 – Multivariate, Local and Detailed Characteristics tables for: Living arrangements; Household composition; and Accommodation type.

==== Subsequent releases of UK-wide 2011 Census specialist products ====
A series of further releases, subsequent to the four main releases of 2011 Census statistics including migration tables, workplace tables, detailed religion and ethnic group tables, and statistics relating to alternative population bases. Specialist products would include:- Small population groups; microdata; flow data (also known as origin-destination statistics). It is also suggested that data organised around alternative population bases may be produced.

- Release of European Commission Census Regulation Statistics (31 March 2014) – UK data provided as part of an EU project to provide comparable statistics
- Release of Key and Quick Statistics (13 June 2014) – Consolidated data sets previously published by the relevant census office in each constituent country of the UK.
- Release OD1a Origin-destination data (25 July 2014) – Migration, workplace and students for local authorities
- Release OD1a Origin-destination data (25 November 2014) – Movement of students from boarding school addresses
- Release OD1a Origin-destination data (25 November 2014) – Location of usual residence and place of work
- Release OD1c Origin-destination data (25 November 2014) – Internal and international migration.
- Release UN questionnaire (18 December 2014) – UK submission for United Nations questionnaire on population and housing censuses (part 1)
- Release UN questionnaire (21 January 2015) – UK submission for United Nations questionnaire on population and housing censuses (part 2)
- Release UK1 (28 January 2015) – UK Detailed Migration tables
- Release OD2 Origin-destination data (25 March 2015) – Migration for local authorities
Data release schedule for England and Wales 2011 census data

The original plans of the ONS, covering England and Wales, confirmed that there would be four stages of data release starting in July 2012 and running until October 2013. This was increased to five stages in October 2013. A detailed commentary accompanies each release along with relevant reference materials. Additionally there will be graphic visualisations providing further clarification and comparison between different data sets and comparison over time using data from earlier censuses. There will also be more specialist reports and products. Certain data bases will also be produced in the Welsh language.

==== First phase releases: July – November 2012 ====
Population estimates, age and sex, and occupied households estimates for England and for Wales

===== Release 1.1 (July and September 2012) =====
- Release 1.1R (16 July) – Rounded estimates of the usual resident population and households by age, and sex and occupied households at country, regional, and local authority level
- Release 1.1U (24 September) – Unrounded estimates of the usual resident population and households by age, and sex and occupied households at country, regional, and local authority level

===== Release 1.2 (22 October 2012) =====
Residents with second properties outside the local authority area of their primary residence, at country and local authority level

===== Release 1.3 (23 November 2012) =====
Estimates of the usual resident population and households by age, and sex and occupied households at ward and output area level

==== Second phase releases: December 2012 – March 2013 ====
Key and quick univariate (single parameter) statistics based on output levels, with release based on geography. (e.g. local authority, wards and parish/ community) tabulated by population count and percentages and accessible by post code.

===== Release 2.1 (11 December 2012) =====
Key Statistics for local authorities in England and Wales comprising data which adds detail to the population estimates published in July 2012. It includes population information on international migration, age, ethnicity, national identity, health, housing and religion. Also labour force survey data. For Wales, there is data on the Welsh language and population data on unitary authorities.

===== Release 2.2 (30 January 2013) =====
Statistical tables for Output Areas (OAs) and for wards. Background information covering families, general health and disability, unpaid care, language, occupation and industry, qualifications and economic activity.

===== Release 2.3 (19 February 2013) =====
Key and quick statistics for postcode sectors, health areas and Welsh Government devolved constituencies, and the key statistics for national parks in England and Wales, with a separate release for Wales only.

===== Release 2.4 (26 March 2013) =====
Statistical tables for non-UK short-term residents in England and Wales and quick statistics for England and Wales on national identity, passports held and country of birth, with a separate release for Wales only.

==== Third phase releases: May 2013 – February 2014 ====
Detailed characteristics in some cases determined by geography

===== Release 3.1 (16 May 2013) =====
More detailed cross tabulation of data topics: Migration; ethnicity, identity, language and religion; health; and Welsh tables. Based on local authority areas.

===== Release 3.2 (June 2013 and July 2013) =====
- Release 3.2a (28 June) – Topics: Number of usual residents and number of households for Postcodes. Key statistics for built-up areas. Housing and demography. Based on local authority, regions, country, health areas and national parks.
- Release 3.2b (12 July) – Topics: Migration, ethnicity identity, language, religion unpaid care and health. Based on local authority, wards, regions, country, heath areas and national parks. This release provides the first detailed cross tabulations of two or more topics previously issued in Releases 3.1 and 3.2a for MSOAs and 'Merged Wards'.

===== Release 3.3 (30 August 2013) =====
Detailed Characteristics tables for the themes of demography and families at local authority, MSOA and ward level. English language proficiency for regions, local authorities, 2011 Census Merged Wards and MSOAs in England and Wales.

===== Release 3.4 (26 September 2013) =====
Detailed Characteristics tables for communal establishments at local authority, MSOA and ward level

===== Release 3.5 (November 2013 – February 2014) =====
- Release 3.5a (29 November) Detailed Characteristics tables for labour markets and qualifications at local authority, MSOA and ward level
- Release 3.5b (19 December) Detailed Characteristics tables for labour markets and qualifications at local authority, MSOA and ward level
- Release 3.5c (26 February) Detailed Characteristics for approximated social grade for MSOAs and wards in England and Wales

===== Release 3.6 (26 February 2014) =====
Detailed Characteristics tables for travel to work and armed forces, MSOA and ward level car or van availability for local authorities

==== Fourth phase releases: July 2013 – April 2014 ====
Topics will include multivariate data based on combinations of; age, sex resident type, ethnic group, economic activity, general health, provision of unpaid leave, country of birth, occupation, dwelling and accommodation type, household space

===== Release 4.1 (31 July 2013) =====
The first Local Characteristics tables for the topics of ethnicity, identity, language and religion for Output Areas, unitary and local authorities and regions.

===== Release 4.2 (30 August 2013) =====
Local Characteristics tables for the topics of health and unpaid care for Output Areas. Follow up to Release 3.2b on 12 July 2013.

===== Release 4.3 (26 September 2013) =====
Local Characteristic Tables for the topic of migration for Output Areas.

===== Release 4.4 (January – February 2014) =====
- Release 4.4a (23 January 2014) – Local Characteristic Tables: Demography for Output Areas
- Release 4.4b (23 January 2014) – Local Characteristic Tables: Housing for Output Areas

===== Release 4.5 (February 2014) =====
- Release 4.5a (26 February 2014) – Local Characteristic Tables: Labour market for Output Areas
- Release 4.5b (26 February 2014) – Local Characteristic Tables: Occupations for Output Areas

===== Release 4.6 (26 March 2014) =====
Local Characteristics on travel to work and car and van availability for Output Areas.

==== Fifth phase releases: 31 October 2013 – April 2014 ====
===== Release 5.1 (October 2013) =====
- Release 5.1a (31 October) – Topics: Non UK born short-term resident population statistics for Local Authorities.
- Release 5.1b (31 October) – Topics: Workday population statistics for Output Areas (Part 1)

===== Release 5.2 (April 2014) =====
- Release 5.2a (24 April 2014) – Topics: Workplace Population Statistics using the new workplace zone geography
- Release 5.2b (24 April 2014) – Topics: Workday Population Statistics for MSOAs and Output Areas (Part 2)

===== Release 5.3 (24 September) =====
Out-of-term time statistics for:- population density, Marital and civil partnership status, sex and age, ethnic group and country of birth, main language, Welsh language, religion, passport held, provision of unpaid care, general health, highest level of qualification, economic activity, hours worked, industry, occupation, length of residence in the UK.

==== Sixth phase releases (May 2014) ====
- Release 6.1a (23 May 2014) – Migration Statistics for Wales
- Release 6.2 (23 May 2014) – Armed Forces Statistics for Local Authorities in England and Wales

==== Subsequent releases of specialist products ====
In addition to the six main releases phases further supplementary, smaller scale and specialist releases including; Small population groups, Microdata (teaching files, safeguarded files and secure files), Origin-destination data, and Alternate population bases.

===== Supplementary Releases via Nomis =====
- Release Sup. 1 (9 April 2014) Local Characteristics tables released on Nomis for:- residence, ethnic group, national identity, language proficiency, long-term health, student accommodation, highest level of qualification and occupation.
- Release Sup, 2 (25 May 2014) Local Characteristics tables released on Nomis for:- ethnic group, general health, religion and social grade.
- Release Sup, 3 (9 September 2014) Local Characteristics tables released on Nomis – Part 1:- residence, country of birth, long-term and general health, religion, language proficiency, provision of unpaid care, workplace and travel to work.
- Release Sup, 4 (28 January 2015) Local and Detailed Characteristics tables released on Nomis – Part 2:- communal establishments. sex by age with ages below 25 broken down to single year of age

===== Supplementary Releases of Origin-destination data =====
- Release OD1a Origin-destination data (25 July 2014) (superseded by UK release 25 November 2014) – Internal and international migrants for merged local authorities and MSOAs.
- Release OD1a Origin-destination data (25 July 2014) (superseded by UK release 25 November 2014) – Commuting patterns and workplaces for merged local authorities and MSOAs.
- Release OD1b Origin-destination data (25 July 2014) – Dependent children Usual and second residences for merged local authorities and MSOAs.
- Release OD2 Origin-destination data (25 March 2015) – Location of usual residence and place of work for Output Areas and Workplace Zones

===== Smaller scale Releases =====
- Release Small population Dataset SP1 (18 December 2014) – specific ethnic group or country of birth population by sex and age.
- Release Small population Dataset SP2 (18 December 2014) – separate ethnic group, religion or national identity by sex, age, economic activity, qualifications, provision of unpaid care and disability.
Data release schedule for Northern Ireland 2011 census data

The release plans for Northern Ireland were set out by the NISRA. The release phases are closely synchronised with those of the ONS for England and Wales with some marginal variations to allow for local administrative arrangements. The release phases are as follows:-

==== First phases releases (July – September 2012) ====
===== Release 1.1 (16 July 2012) =====
Usual resident population by single age and sex.

===== Release 1.2 (19 September 2012) =====
Usual resident population by single age and sex for Local Government Districts, etc. Household number and size by geographic units.

==== Second phase releases (December 2012 – February 2013) ====
===== Release 2.1 (11 December 2012) =====
Key statistics for NI and Local Government Districts etc.

===== Release 2.2 (30 January 2013) =====
Key statistics for Assembly Areas, Electoral Wards, Super Output Areas (SOAs) and Sammer Areas (SAs)

===== Release 2.3 (28 February 2013) =====
Quick statistics for all geographies and population and household estimates for lower geographies.

==== Third phase releases (May – November 2013) ====
===== Release 3.1 (16 May 2013) =====
Detailed characteristics for NI-wide and all local authority and other geographies (including religion, identity and health).

===== Release 3.2 (28 June 2013) =====
Detailed characteristics for NI (including ethnicity, country of birth and language).

===== Release 3.3 (11 September 2013) =====
Remaining detailed characteristics for NI including labour market and housing.

===== Release 3.4 (28 November 2013) =====
All outstanding detailed characteristics for the remaining geographic areas.

==== Fourth phase release (March 2014) ====
===== Release 4.1 (20 March 2014) =====
Multivariate local characteristic tables and detailed themes around: economic activity; country of birth; occupation; and unpaid care.

==== Subsequent releases of specialist products ====
In addition to the three main releases further smaller-scale and specialist releases including; Detailed, Local Characteristics, Special and Alternative populations:

- Release (24 September 2014) Short-Term Resident Population
- Release (19 November 2014) Workplace Population Statistics
- Release (18 December 2014) Daytime Population Statistics
- Release (30 January 2015) Statistics for New Local Government Districts, Wards and Small Areas
- Release (26 February 2015) Detailed and Local Characteristics Travel to Work or Place of Study
- Release (26 February 2015) Additional Workplace and Daytime Population Statistics
Data release schedule for Scotland 2011 census data

The release plans for Scotland were set out by the GROS Release phase dates are partly in sync with those of the other UK constituent country statistical authorities, however the first release was scheduled for six months after the first releases by the other authorities. Consequently, release of UK-wide data has been scheduled so as to coincide with release plans for Scotland's Census releases. The release phases are as follows:-

==== First release: (December 2012 – August 2013) ====
Population estimates, based on resident households, communal establishments and age bands.

===== Release 1A (17 December 2012) =====
Estimates of the usually resident population of Scotland rounded to the nearest thousand, broken down by age and sex. An estimate of the total population in each council area, rounded to nearest thousand.

===== Release 1B (21 March 2013) =====
Population estimates by five-year age bands and sex for Scotland and each council area. Household estimates. Population and household changes since 2001 census. Population dependency ratios for Scotland and each council area.

===== Release 1C (July – August 2013) =====
First release of unrounded population estimates and household communal establishment numbers, by single year of age and sex. (First published as rounded data in December 2012 and March 2013).

- Release 1C (part one) (23 July 2013) National, council areas, and health boards.
- Release 1C (part two) (15 August 2013) postcodes, Output Areas and census datazones.

==== Second release: (September – December 2013) ====
Key and quick statistics; Census Profiles; headcounts and geography products. Comprising; Estimates by postcode and geography products. This release will represent the start of the dissemination of detailed census statistics for small areas.

===== Release 2A (26 September 2013) =====
Key and quick statistics tables for marriage and civil partnership, ethnicity, religion, language proficiency, country of birth and national identity, heath (excluding long-term health), age, arrival in UK, population and households, housing and accommodation, car and van ownership. Coverage: Scotland, Council Areas and Health Boards.

===== Release 2B (11 November 2013) =====
Key and quick statistics tables for Education and Labour Market. Coverage: All output areas and Data Zones. Also the key and quick statistics for the remaining geographies of the topics covered in Release 2a.

===== Release 2C (18 December 2013) =====
Key and quick statistics tables for Living Arrangements and Travel to Work Methods. Coverage: All levels of census geographies.

===== Release 2D (9 April 2014) =====
Key and quick statistics tables for households, health and deprivation

==== Third release: (February 2014 onwards) ====
Local Characteristics tables. Multivariate statistics, comprising a combination of; age, sex, resident type, ethnic group, economic activity, general health and provision of unpaid care, country of birth, and occupation.

===== Release 3A (27 February 2014) =====
Detailed Characteristics tables for Ethnicity, National Identity, Language Proficiency and Skills and Religion topics −1

===== Release 3B (19 March 2014) =====
Local and Detailed Characteristics tables for Ethnicity, National Identity, Language Proficiency and Skills and Religion topics −2

===== Release 3C (9 April 2014) =====
Local and Detailed Characteristics tables for Ethnicity, National Identity, Language Proficiency and Skills and Religion topics −3

===== Release 3D (15 May 2014) =====
Local and Detailed Characteristics tables from Marriage and Civil Partnership, Household, Residency, Family and Living Arrangements, English Language Skills

===== Release 3E (4 June 2014) =====
Local and Detailed Characteristics tables from Marriage and Civil Partnership, Residency, Family and Living Arrangements, Communial establishments

===== Release 3F (25 June 2014) =====
Local and Detailed Characteristics tables for Health, Housing, Population and Diversity

===== Release 3G (23 July 2014) =====
Local and Detailed Characteristics tables for Economic Activity and Education

===== Release 3H (13 August 2014) =====
Local and Detailed Characteristics tables for Qualifications, Employment and Economic Activity, Travel for Work and Study.

===== Release 3I (24 September 2014) =====
Local and Detailed Characteristics tables for Labour Market and Education tables

===== Release 3J (16 October 2014) =====
Local and Detailed Characteristics tables including Long-term Health and Care, Housing and Accommodation

===== Release 3K (6 November 2014) =====
Local and Detailed Characteristics tables including Household and Residence

===== Release 3L (27 November 2014) =====
Local and Detailed Characteristics tables including Transport

===== Release 3M (18 December 2014) =====
Local and Detailed Characteristics tables including Transport and Population and Households

===== Release 3N (29 January 2015) =====
Local and Detailed Characteristics tables including; Travel to Work, Household, Qualifications and Long-term Health, Social Status and Economic Activity.

==== Subsequent releases of specialist products ====
In addition to the three main releases further smaller-scale and specialist releases including; Detailed, Local Characteristics, Special and Alternative populations:

- Release (24 September 2014)Short-Term Resident Population
- Release (19 November 2014)Workplace Population Statistics
- Release (18 December 2014) Daytime Population Statistics
- Release (30 January 2015) Statistics for New Local Government Districts, Wards and Small Areas
- Release (26 February 2015) Detailed and Local Characteristics Travel to Work or Place of Study
- Release (26 February 2015) Additional Workplace and Daytime Population Statistics

=== Publication of the 2011 census results ===
The United Kingdom Statistics Authority is responsible for coordinating the release of census data by the devolved statistics authorities. It publishes UK-wide census data results via the Office for National Statistics (ONS) site. The UK Data Service provides a central point of reference for all country-specific census data releases via its Learning Hub site.

Primary responsibility for country-specific 2011 census data rests with the statistical authorities for each of the UK's constituent countries. Each authority has at least one dedicated central source from which data can be downloaded or ordered. For England and Wales the ONS provides the access to primary data via its 2011 census site. Additionally, data organised by local authority or post code is available on the Neighbourhood Statistics site, and nomis, a source of detailed census results which can be assembled into bespoke data sets. For Scotland the General Registrar Office for Scotland (GROS) part of National Records of Scotland (NRS) to maintain access via its Scotlands Census site, and for Northern Ireland the Statistics and Research Authority (NISRA) uses the Northern Ireland Neighbourhood Information Service (NINIS).

==== Pre-defined statistical tables ====
The format of all the pre-defined statistical tables is standardised as far as practical across the publishing authorities. Since the 2001 UK census the naming conventions for the tables have been revised following research into the approaches adopted by other census publishing bodies around the world.

- Key Statistics – KS (same as in 2001)
- Quick Statistics – QS (formerly Univariate (UV) tables)
- Local Characteristics – LC (formerly Census Area Statistics (CAS))
- Detailed Characteristics – DC (formerly Standard (S) tables)
- Themes – T (formerly Standard Themes (T) tables)
- Local Themes – LT (formerly Census Area Statistics Themes (CAST) tables)

==== Bulk data ====
The statistical authorities are also making available bulk data in Comma-separated values (CSV) file format which can be downloaded from online data warehouse facilities.

==== Commissioned data ====
In addition to the standard releases and online bulk access the statistical authorities provide a commissioned data service whereby other data configurations can be purchased, under license, by customers and will subsequently be made freely available to other users.

== See also ==
- Census in the United Kingdom

Preceded by 2001	UK census 2011	Succeeded by 2021
