= Beyond 2011 =

Project for planning 2021 UK census

Beyond 2011, also known as The Beyond 2011 Programme, was a project initiated by the UK Statistics Authority to look at the alternatives to running a UK census in 2021. In 2008, the Treasury Select Committee had expressed concerns about the increasing cost of running the census and inaccuracies in data gathered only every ten years. In 2010, the newly elected coalition government reiterated such concerns responding to a report by the UK Statistics Authority.

The Beyond 2011 Programme was established in 2011 to look at alternatives to the traditional census approach. The UK Statistics Authority will coordinate activity with its counterparts in the devolved administrations of Scotland and Northern Ireland which have also set up reviews of the future approach to population data provision. In 2012 six options were identified by the Beyond 2011 Programme for further consideration, ranging from a full 10-year census to rolling or smaller scale annual surveys, some supplemented by administrative data capture.

In 2014, the UK Statistics Authority announced its recommendation for the 2021 census in England and Wales. It proposed that in 2021, there should be a decennial census for England and Wales which would be conducted predominantly through online returns, supplemented by the further use of administrative and survey data. A parallel announcement for Scotland's 2021 census was made by the National Records for Scotland.

Following agreement to the recommendations in January 2015 the UK Statistics Authority formally closed the Beyond 2011 Programme. It has been replaced by the Census Transformation Programme which has the purpose of taking forward and implementing the vision and recommended approaches.

== Background ==
The decennial census has been the method of collecting United Kingdom-wide population-based statistics since 1801. Currently the UK census is governed by the Census Act 1920. However, prior to 1841 it was no more than a headcount. Since 1841, except in 1941 when no census took place due to the Second World War, detail was gathered about the household. Until the 1901 the enumerators were responsible for completing census enumerator sheets, transcribing the details included in household schedules completed by the head of the household. From the 1911 census onwards an individual census form, provided by and returned to an enumerator, was completed by the head of the household and became the primary source of demographic data. In 2001 census returns were for the first time sent out by post, but were collected by enumerators. The 2011 UK Census was the first time, individual census forms were issued through the Royal Mail and could also be returned by post, except in Scotland where instead they were collected by enumerators. Census forms could also be completed and submitted through the internet by the householder. In recent times, combined with other data, the ten-yearly census has provided the basis of socio-economic statistics used by all branches of national and local government, the Public Services and the private sector.

Both the current UK coalition government and the previous Labour Government expressed concerns about the rising costs of a survey of the whole population conducted once every ten years. Meanwhile, the accuracy and utility of a snapshot of the whole UK population once every ten years compared to continued surveying was being questioned. A rapidly changing society, evolving user requirements and new opportunities were emerging as drivers for change. These concerns and opportunities encouraged the UK Government to investigate alternative methods of population data collection; to identify the best way to provide small area population, and socio-demographic statistics in the future by taking advantages of the more advanced technology that is becoming available, and also to make use of existing sources of demographic data already being collected by the private sector.

A Treasury Select Committee report in 2008 entitled Counting the Population recommended that:

"....the Statistics Authority set strategic objectives to ensure that the data gathered throughout the UK can be used to produce annual population statistics that are of a quality that will enable the 2011 Census to be the last census in the UK where the population is counted through the collection of census forms.

In May 2010 the Chairman of the UK Statistics Authority announced in a letter to the Minister for the Cabinet Office that:

"As a Board we have been concerned about the increasing costs and difficulties of traditional Census-taking. We have therefore already instructed the ONS to work urgently on the alternatives, with the intention that the 2011 Census will be the last of its kind."

The Cabinet Office Minister, Francis Maude was reported in Daily Telegraph in July 2010 as saying:

"....the Census, which takes place every 10 years, was an expensive and inaccurate way of measuring the number of people in Britain. Instead, the government is examining different and cheaper ways to count the population more regularly, using existing public and private databases, including credit reference agencies. It will represent a historic shift in the way that information about the nation's population, religion and social habits is gathered."

In April 2011 The Beyond 2011 Programme was launched in England and Wales by the ONS with the purpose of identifying the best way to provide small area population and socio-demographic statistics as an alternative to running a traditional ten-year census in 2021. As part of the review of future requirements the National Records of Scotland launched a Beyond 2011 Programme for Scotland in September 2011, and the Northern Ireland Statistics and Research Agency said it is also participating in the Beyond 2011 project.

The UK Population Committee comprising the National Statistician, the Registrars General in Scotland and Northern Ireland and the Chief Statistician for the Welsh and Scottish Governments, agreed to collaborate to ensure as far as possible there was a harmonised approach on definitions, methods, data sources and outputs. A UK Beyond 2011 Committee was established to coordinate UK-wide work to review alternative approaches to meeting future user needs for population and small area socio-demographic statistics. It would also take into account benefits and cost savings, the wider initiatives of the devolved administrations, and the provision of aggregated statistical data to Eurostat. The statistical authorities would make recommendations to the UK Government and the devolved Administrations in 2014. Subject to governmental approval the UK Beyond 2011 Committee would oversee implementation from 2015.

== The Beyond 2011 programme ==
The Beyond 2011 Programme is being coordinated on behalf of UK Statistics by the Office for National Statistics (ONS). The ONS advised it would collaborate with the statistical authorities of the devolved administrations of Scotland and Northern Ireland, in order to ensure the consistency of statistics across the whole of the United Kingdom. The UK Statistics Authority has indicated that the Beyond 2011 recommendations will take into account user requirements, 'public burden', costs and public acceptability and above all the statistical viability of the potential solutions. The recommendations are anticipated to have implications for all population-based statistics and potentially, in the longer term, for the statistics gathering, analysis and publishing systems as a whole.

=== Programme timeline ===
Phase 1 between 2011 and 2014 involves; scoping possible options, user consultation, finalise options, making recommendations. Phase 2 between 2014 and 2020 would depend on the solution chosen but if not a UK census would involve; selection the solution(s), detailed design, procuring, developing and testing. Phase 3 from 2020 to 2021; prepare and conduct population data gathering, analysis followed by output of population estimates and detailed local, regional and national geographies characteristics.

=== User consultation exercise ===
A user consultation exercise was conducted between October 2011 and January 2012 the results of which were published in August 2012. The consultation focussed on two issues: • the current and future requirements for population and socio-demographic statistics on different topics; and, • the trade-off between accuracy, geography and the frequency at which the statistics are produced. The results indicated that users still favoured a traditional field-based census. There are newly emerging and increasing data requirements for local-decision-making. There is a need for more timely and regular statistics on a wider-range of themes. Accuracy of data and statistics based on the local geography is of higher importance than the frequency of data production. Genealogists are concerned about the potential loss of historical records.

=== Options considered ===
Initially, eight options were identified which were assessed. Following initial consideration it was found that some of the options had identical components so it was decided to redefine the options in the form of varying quality standards covering census, survey and administrative data aggregation, which would each be assessed in terms of accuracy, frequency and geography. In 2012 the second round of assessment commenced with six possible options identified for detailed investigation. The criteria for assessment of these options will comprise cost, technical feasibility, risk, public acceptability, and fitness for purpose.

- Option 1 Full census - conducted once every 10 years with a circa 1% coverage survey, intercensal population estimates produced by cohort component method.
- Option 2 Rolling census - conducted on an annual basis comprising between 4 - 10% of the population (rolling round the country) with an annual coverage survey. Precise sampling design (how often each geographical unit is visited) to be confirmed.
- Option 3 Short Form Census and 4% Annual Survey - A census every 10 years with a circa 1% coverage survey, intercensal population estimates produced by cohort component method. Annual attribute survey with a c4% annual achieved sample size.
- Option 4 Annual Linkage and 10% 10-yearly Survey - Administrative data linkage plus an annual circa 1% coverage survey with a one-off circa 10% coverage survey in 2021 to validate the method. Ten yearly attribute survey with achieved sample size of circa 10%.
- Option 5 Annual Linkage and 4% Annual Survey - Administrative data linkage plus an annual circa 1% coverage survey with a one-off circa 10% coverage survey in 2021 to validate the method. Annual attribute survey with achieved sample size of circa 4%.
- Option 6 Annual Linkage and 40% 10-yearly Survey - Administrative data linkage plus an annual circa 1% coverage survey with a one-off circa 10% coverage survey in 2021 to validate the method. Ten yearly attribute survey with achieved sample size of circa 40%.

=== Administrative data ===
The majority of the focus was on the last three options which comprise an administrative data aggregation approach as these are less well understood. Administrative data, underpinned by a National Address Register (yet to be established), includes public sector data obtained from government departments (e.g. HMRC) and agencies, (such as the DVLA), local authorities, electoral registers, the Annual School Census, the Higher Education Student Statistics database, and from the NHS Central Patients Register. From the private sector e.g. utility companies, retail and financial sectors, credit reference agencies and customer information systems.

Commentary by the ONS in May 2013 reported that initial assessment found:- Option 1, the Full Census produced high quality data but only every ten years but was expensive to produce though could be reduced through a move to predominantly an internet-based completion approach. Option 2, the rolling census and Option 3, the Short-form census have both been assessed as even more expensive than the full census. Of the three options making use of administrative data, option 5, with an annual rolling survey comprising around 4% of the population was the most cost-effective and produced the best quality data.

=== Public consultation ===
On 30 August 2013 the Beyond 2011 Programme announced plans for a public consultation to run from September to December 2013. The purpose of the consultation is to consider the two leading options from the six original possible approaches to estimate the population and gather demographic data:

- The Online Census Option: An online census to be carried out every 10 years. This approach would be supplemented by using administrative data to take account of population change in intervening years
- The Administrative Data Option: An approach that depends on the re-use of the 'administrative data' already held within government - combined with a 4% rolling annual survey to estimate the characteristics of the population

As part of the consultation users will be asked how they use population statistics, the benefits they bring, and the advantages and disadvantages of these two options. The consultation will be conducted via an online survey and a number of public events.

=== User statements ===
Alongside the public consultation research into the uses of census information is being undertaken across governmental, industrial sector and professional groups i.e. inter and intra-governmental discussion, liaison with local government, public, commercial and 'third' sectors, emergency organisations, housing and utilities, academic, genealogy and social research, European Union. This activity generates user statements which are being published in order to generate wider responses.

=== Independent review of methodology ===
In 2013 ONS commissioned a review led by Professor Chris Skinner of LSE to assess the robustness of the methodology and statistical research; identify where evidence could be significantly improved; and what the main risks were with the likely approach and how these risks could be mitigated. Aside from a number of recommendations of further work to be undertaken the Review report, published in November 2013 concluded that of the two leading options, online census and administrative data, the online census approach would provide a robust methodology to succeed the 2011 census, whereas the administrative data approach whilst potentially offering some advantages did not as yet have a sufficiently developed methodology to replace the present questionnaire surveying approach.

== Recommended approach ==
In March 2014 the National Statistician announced the UK Statistics Authority's recommended that there should be a 2021 census in England and Wales. It proposed the census should be conducted predominantly online, requiring a return from all household and communal establishments, with help and support provided to individuals unwilling or unable to provide information via the internet. The census return would be supplemented by administrative and survey data. In a letter to the Minister to the Cabinet Office, the Rt Hon Francis Maude, the Chair of the Statistics Authority, Sir Andrew Dilnot said consultations had indicated the demand for a decennial census remained strong. In addition to the 10-yearly census it was also confirmed that there would be an increasing use of administrative and other sources of data on an annual basis to improve the accuracy and utility of population statistics. The National Records of Scotland also announced in March 2014 that it would be adopting the same methodology for the Scotland's census in 2021 and for annual population statistics gathering

=== Reactions to proposals ===
In April 2014 the British House of Commons Public Accounts Committee (PAC) concluded in its report Too soon to scrap the Census that the 2021 census should go ahead. It recommended that the UK Statistics Authority develop "a more ambitious vision for the creative and full use of administrative data to provide rich and valuable population statistics." It encouraged the ONS clarify the advantages and disadvantages of using administrative data in place of much of the information the census currently gathers. The PAC also extolled the UK Government to embark upon a public information campaign to raise understanding of the benefits of sharing administrative data, with reassurance that it would put in place the safeguards to protect people's personal information and privacy.

Responding in July 2014 to the National Statistical Authority, the Minister to the Cabinet Office welcomed the recommendations of a predominantly online census for England and Wales supplemented by the use of governmental and other administrative data. However, it was also made clear that whereas for 2021 a dual-running decennial national census with administrative data gathering was viewed as an acceptable transitional approach the government did not see this as the way forward post 2021. It asked the National Statistician to ensure sufficient research is undertaken and the feasibility of alternative methods validated in the run up to 2021 to replace the traditional national census and intermediate surveying approach from after that date. The Government also indicated it recognised the implications of greater data-sharing between government departments on public confidence in the security and privacy of their personal information.

== Census transformation programme ==
Following the go ahead given by the government, in January 2015 the UK Statistics Authority closed the Beyond 2011 Programme and established a Census Transformation Programme. The vision for the programme is "...to make the best use of all available population data to help shape tomorrow". The purpose of the programme is to take forward and implement this recommended vision. It involves three strands of work:

- Strand 1 - will look at the 2021 Census data collection operation and its coverage survey, including the address register, field force, online/paper data collection, public support and enumeration of communal establishments
- Strand 2 - will deal with integrating census, administrative and survey data to provide and disseminate census outputs
- Strand 3 - will look further ahead, addressing how to produce population statistics beyond the 2021 Census.
