= Selina Todd =

British historian

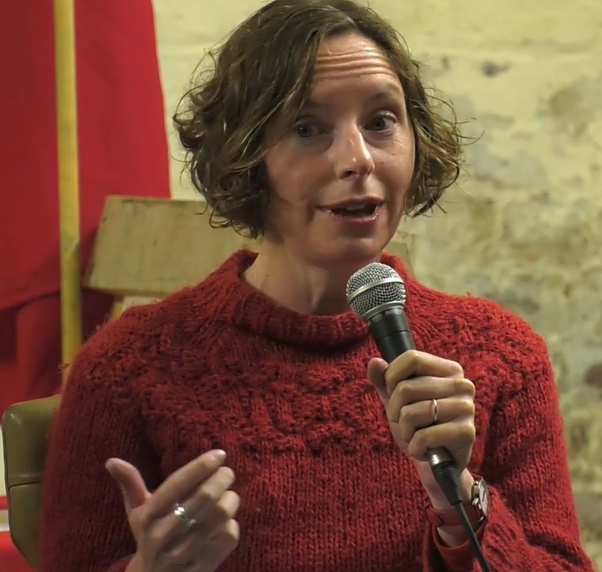
- Todd in 2017
- Born: 1975 (age 50–51); Newcastle upon Tyne, England

Academic background
- Education: University of Warwick; University of Sussex

Academic work
- Discipline: History
- Sub-discipline: History of the British Isles; Feminist history
- Institutions: Institute of Historical Research, University of London; Girton College, Cambridge; University of Warwick; University of Manchester; St Hilda's College, Oxford; University of Oxford

Selina Todd (born 1975) is an English historian and writer. From 2015, she has been Professor of Modern History at the University of Oxford. Todd's research focuses on the history of the working-class, women and feminism in modern Britain. From 2017 to 2022, Todd was president of the Socialist Educational Association.

== Early life ==
Selina Todd was born in Newcastle upon Tyne in 1975. After schooling at a state comprehensive, she completed her undergraduate degree in history at Warwick University. She took a Master of Arts degree and then a doctor of philosophy degree in history at the University of Sussex.

== Career ==
After holding a Scouloudi Fellowship and Economic and Social Research Council Post-doctoral Fellowship at the Institute of Historical Research, Todd was elected to the Ottilie Hancock Research Fellowship in History at Girton College, Cambridge, in 2004. The following year, she was appointed a lecturer at Warwick University, and in 2007 took a lectureship in modern British history at the University of Manchester.

In 2010, she was appointed a Fellow at St Hilda's College, Oxford, and a lecturer in history at the University of Oxford. In 2015, she was awarded the title of Professor of Modern History in the University of Oxford. She was vice-principal of St Hilda's College between 2014 and 2017. She has held several editorial roles, including serving on the Board of the historical journal Past and Present. Her biography of Shelagh Delaney, Tastes of Honey, was published in 2019.

From 2017 to 2022, Todd was president of the Socialist Educational Association. As of September 2020, Todd is a lead researcher at the Oxford Martin Programme on Women's Equality and Inequality.

== Views on transgender topics ==
Todd and more than 30 other academics signed a public letter sent to The Sunday Times published on 16 June 2019, which claimed that universities paying for LGBT diversity training by Stonewall stifled academic debate because "tendentious and anti-scientific claims are presented . . . as objective fact".

In January 2020, Todd revealed that she had been warned of threats against her on social media; after an investigation at her request, Oxford University arranged security guards to accompany her to lectures. Todd said she received threats from trans rights activists for making public her view that transgender women should be denied access to women-only spaces - such as women's refuges and rape crisis centres. She said: "In the world today democracy is under threat and therefore we all have to defend the right of people to have freedom of speech and freedom of debate."

In February 2020, Todd was no platformed at a celebration in Oxford, which she had helped organise, of the 50th anniversary of the National Women's Liberation Conference of 1970. An invitation to speak, which had been accepted by Todd, was withdrawn on the eve of the event. When another event speaker, Lola Olufemi, withdrew in protest at Todd's association with the campaign group Woman's Place UK, which Olufemi accused of transphobia, Todd wrote in response: "I refute the allegation that I am transphobic, and I am disappointed that the organisers have refused to uphold our right to discuss women's rights – one that the original organisers had to fight hard for."

In November 2021, Todd wrote to The Times to criticise the Athena Swan scheme provided by the educational charity Advance HE as promoting a "controversial view of sex and gender".

== Select bibliography ==
Todd's research focuses on the history of the working-class, gender and feminism in modern Britain. Her 2005 book Young Women, Work and Family in England 1918–1950 won the Women's History Network Annual Book Prize.

- "Poverty and aspiration: young women's entry into employment", Twentieth Century British History, vol. 15, no. 2 (2004), pp. 119–142.
- Young Women, Work, and Family in England 1918–1950 (Oxford: Oxford University Press, 2005).
- "Breadwinners and dependants: Working-class young people in England, 1918–1955", International Review of Social History, vol. 52, no. 1 (2007), pp. 57–87.
- "Affluence, class and Crown Street: Reinvestigating the post-war working class", Contemporary British History, vol. 22, no. 4 (2008), pp. 501–518.
- "Domestic Service and Class Relations in Britain, 1900–1950", Past & Present, vol. 203, no. 1 (2009), pp. 181–204.
- (Co-authored with Hilary Young) "Baby-boomers to 'beanstalkers': Making the modern teenager in post-war Britain", Cultural and Social History, vol. 9, no. 3 (2012), pp. 451–467.
- "People Matter", History Workshop Journal, vol. 76 (2013), pp. 259–265.
- "Family, welfare and social work in post-war England, c.1948–c.1970", The English Historical Review, vol. 129, no. 537 (2014), pp. 362–387.
- "Class, experience and Britain's twentieth century", Social History, vol. 39, no. 4 (2014), pp. 489–508.
- The People: the Rise and Fall of the Working Class 1910–2010 (London: John Murray, 2014).
- Tastes of Honey: the making of Shelagh Delaney and a Cultural Revolution (London: Chatto & Windus, 2019).
- Snakes and Ladders: the Great British Social Mobility Myth (London: Chatto & Windus, 2021)
- Sex and Gender: A Contemporary Reader (co-editor with Alice Sullivan; Abingdon: Routledge, 2023)

== See also ==
- Feminist views on transgender topics
