= General Register Office (Northern Ireland) =

Register office of Northern Ireland

The General Register Office (GRO) (Northern Ireland) is responsible for the civil registration of births, deaths, marriages, civil partnerships and adoptions as well as administering marriage and civil partnership law in Northern Ireland. The GRO is within the Northern Ireland Statistics and Research Agency (NISRA), which in turn is part of the Northern Ireland Executive's Department of Finance. Its main office is at Colby House, Stranmillis Court, Belfast.

== Registration indexes held by GRONI ==
- births registered from 1 January 1864 in what is now Northern Ireland
- adoptions recorded in the Adopted Children Register Northern Ireland from 1 January 1931
- registered non-Roman Catholic marriages from 1 April 1845 and all registered marriages from 1 January 1864
- civil partnerships registered in Northern Ireland from 5 December 2005
- deaths registered from 1 January 1864 in what is now Northern Ireland
- World War II death indexes from 1939 to 1945

Certificates are only available for life events registered in what is now Northern Ireland.

== Access to records ==
Life event certificates can be ordered online, by telephone (0300 200 7890 or 028 91513101 if outside NI) or by post, with a form downloaded from the site. Applications for collection in person may only be made at the General Register Office in Belfast, with delivery options of third working day for the basic fee, and same day, usually within 30 minutes, for a higher fee.

=== Online resources ===
Since April 2014, parts of the registers can be searched on the office's website, with a basic record (place and date of birth, and parental name(s)) available for 50p, and a full scan for £2.50.

For data protection reasons, records available only include:

- birth records over 100 years old
- marriage records over 75 years old
- death records (including World War II death records) over 50 years old

You cannot access civil partnership and adoption records online. If you want to view these records, or view recent records, you must book an appointment at the public search room or, if you know the details, you can apply online for certificates. Stillbirth records are only available by contacting the office.

=== GRONI search room access ===
The search room is open from 9.30 am until 4.00 pm (except the first Tuesday every month, when the office opens at 10.00 am). Booking is advised. The public search room is accessible to wheelchair users and a personal induction loop system is available for deaf or hearing-impaired visitors.

== See also ==
- General Register Office
- Office for National Statistics
- Northern Ireland Statistics and Research Agency
