= Alice Sullivan =

British sociologist

Academic background
- Education: Balliol College, Oxford (BA); Nuffield College, Oxford (MSc, DPhil)

Academic work
- Discipline: Sociology
- Institutions: University College London

Alice Sullivan is a British sociologist and Professor of Sociology at University College London.

== Career ==
Sullivan received her bachelor's in philosophy, politics and economics from Balliol College, Oxford and her master's and doctorate in sociology form Nuffield College, Oxford. She co-edited Sex and Gender: A Contemporary Reader with Selina Todd in 2023. She was featured in the 2025 John Maddox Prize shortlist and is a fellow of the Academy of Social Sciences.

Sullivan has written that the conflation of gender and sex in the 2021 United Kingdom census was a harmful product of what she describes as an "explicitly anti-scientific" "postmodernist project". She was commissioned by Conservative politician Michelle Donelan to publish a study that became known as the Sullivan Review, which investigated the ways in which sex is catalogued in public research. The first part of the study was published by the Department for Science, Innovation and Technology in 2025. It has been criticised with respect to her relationship with the gender critical group Sex Matters and by academics from the University of Glasgow and University of Edinburgh who criticized the study's approach to categorizing sex and gender and research ethics. In December 2025 Sullivan threatened to sue the University of Bristol after a talk presenting the Sullivan Review was disrupted by protesters.

== Works ==
- Sex and Gender: A Contemporary Reader, co-edited with Selina Todd (London: Routledge, 2023) ISBN 978-1032261195
- Sullivan, A. (2001). Cultural capital and educational attainment. Sociology, 35(4), 893-912.
- Sex, Lies and Statistics, why we need evidence-based policy on sex and gender. (Polity books, 2026). ISBN 978-1509566792
