= Northern Ireland Statistics and Research Agency =

Northern Irish executive agency

Logo

The Northern Ireland Statistics and Research Agency (NISRA, Irish: Gníomhaireacht Thuaisceart Éireann um Staitisticí agus Taighde) is an executive agency within the Department of Finance in Northern Ireland. The organisation is responsible for the collection and publication of statistics related to the economy, population, and society of Northern Ireland. It is responsible for conducting the decennial census, with the last Census in Northern Ireland held on 21 March 2021, and incorporates the General Register Office (GRO) for Northern Ireland which is responsible for the registration of births, marriages, civil partnerships and deaths.

== Statistics Advisory Committee ==
In 1988, Statistics Advisory Committee was set up as a non-departmental public body to the Department of Finance to advise on matters relating to the collection and disclosure of statistical information from businesses. Northern Ireland Order 1988.

== See also ==
- Central Statistics Office (CSO)
- Office for National Statistics
- National Records of Scotland
- UK Statistics Authority
- Census in the United Kingdom
