= 2020 Birthday Honours =

British government recognitions

The Queen's Birthday Honours for 2020 are appointments by some of the 16 Commonwealth realms of Queen Elizabeth II to various orders and honours to reward and highlight good works by citizens of those countries. The Birthday Honours are awarded as part of the Queen's Official Birthday celebrations during the month of June. The honours for New Zealand were announced on 1 June, and for Australia on 8 June.

The Queen's Birthday Honours for the United Kingdom would normally have been announced in June, but were delayed until the Autumn because of the COVID-19 pandemic. The honours list was released on 10 October 2020.

== United Kingdom ==
Below are the individuals appointed by Elizabeth II in her right as Queen of the United Kingdom with honours within her own gift, and with the advice of the Government for other honours.

=== Order of the Companions of Honour ===
==== Member of the Order of Companions of Honour (CH) ====
- Sir Paul Brierley Smith CBE – Chairman, Paul Smith Limited. For services to Fashion

=== Knight Bachelor ===
Knight Bachelor ribbon

- Frank Bowling OBE – For services to Art
- Professor Edward Byrne – Vice-Chancellor and Principal, King's College London. For services to Higher Education
- Paul Benedict Crossland Carter CBE – Lately Chairman, County Councils Network and lately Leader, Kent County Council. For services to Local Government
- Professor Charles Richard Arthur Catlow FRS – Foreign Secretary, The Royal Society. For services to Leadership in Science and Research
- Nicholas Dakin – Lately Member of Parliament for Scunthorpe. For political service
- Brendan Foster CBE – For services to International and National Sport and Culture in North East England
- Anthony Christopher Gallagher – For services to Land Development and the Property Business
- The Rt. Hon. David George Hanson – Lately Member of Parliament for Delyn. For political service
- Tommy Steele (Thomas Hicks) OBE – For services to Entertainment and charity
- Professor Stephen Townley Holgate CBE – MRC Clinical Professor of Immunopharmacology and Honorary Consultant Physician, University of Southampton. For services to Medical Research
- Professor Nasser David Khalili – Philanthropist. For services to Interfaith Relations and charity
- Andrew MacKenzie – Chief Executive Officer, BHP Group, Melbourne, Australia. For services to business, science, technology and UK/Australia relations
- Geoffrey John Mulgan CBE – Chief Executive, NESTA. For services to the Creative Economy
- Professor Philip Redmond CBE – For services to Broadcasting and Arts in the Regions
- Donald Runnicles OBE – General Music Director of Deutsche Oper Berlin. For services to music
- Professor John Roy Sambles FRS – Professor, Department of Physics, University of Exeter. For services to Scientific Research and Outreach
- David Courtney Suchet CBE – Actor. For services to Drama and charity

=== Order of the Bath ===
Order of the Bath ribbon

==== Knight Grand Cross of the Order of the Bath (GCB) ====
Military

- Air Chief Marshal Sir Stephen Hillier, KCB, CBE, DFC, ADC

==== Knight/Dame Commander of the Order of the Bath (KCB/DCB) ====
Military

- Admiral Timothy Fraser, CB
- Air Chief Marshal Michael Wigston, CBE

Civil

- Clare Moriarty CB – Lately Permanent Secretary, Department for Exiting the European Union and Department for the Environment, Food and Rural Affairs. For public service
- David Robert Sterling – Head, Northern Ireland Civil Service. For services to Government in Northern Ireland

==== Companion of the Order of the Bath (CB) ====
Military

- Rear Admiral James Norman MacLeod
- Rear Admiral Michael Keith Utley
- The Venerable Clinton Matthew Langston
- Major General Gerald Ian Mitchell
- Air Vice-Marshal Christina Reid Elliot
- Air Vice-Marshal Harv Smyth

Civil

- Samantha Mary Constance Beckett OBE – Director General, EU Exit and Analysis, Department for Business, Energy and Industrial Strategy. For public service
- Professor Saverio Peter Borriello – Chief Executive, Veterinary Medicines Directorate. For services to Global Animal Health and Tackling Anti-Microbial Resistance
- Rowena Collins Rice – Director General, Attorney General's Office. For public service
- Mike Green – Chief Operating Officer, Department for Education. For services to Education
- Amy Louise Holmes OBE – Director, EU and International Trade, Department for Environment, Food and Rural Affairs. For public service
- Thomas Robert Benedict Hurd OBE – Director General, Office for Security and Counter-Terrorism, Home Office. For services to National Security
- Julian Kelly – Lately Director General Nuclear, Ministry of Defence. For public service
- Sonia Clare Phippard CBE – Lately Director General, Environment Rural and Marine, Department for Environment, Food and Rural Affairs. For public service
- Dr David John Snowball – Lately Member, Management Board, Health and Safety Executive. For services to Occupational Health and Safety

=== Order of St Michael and St George ===
Order of St Michael and St George ribbon

==== Knight/Dame Grand Cross of the Order of St Michael and St George (GCMG) ====
- Sir David Attenborough, OM, CH, CVO, CBE – Broadcaster and Natural Historian. For services to television broadcasting and to conservation
- Sir Tim Barrow, KCMG, LVO, MBE – UK Ambassador to the European Union, Brussels, Belgium. For services to British foreign policy
- Sir Julian King, KCVO, CMG – lately European Commissioner for the Security Union, Brussels, Belgium. For services to security in Europe

==== Knight/Dame Commander of the Order of St Michael and St George (KCMG/DCMG) ====
- Sarah MacIntosh CMG – UK Permanent Representative to NATO, Brussels, Belgium. For services to British foreign policy
- Graham Wrigley – Chair, CDC Group Plc. For services to International Development

==== Companion of the Order of St Michael and St George (CMG) ====
- Paul Chakravati – Deputy Director, Foreign, Commonwealth and Development Office. For services to national security
- Anna Clunes OBE – Director and Acting Director General, EU Exit, Foreign, Commonwealth and Development Office. For services to British foreign policy
- Joanna Crellin – HM Trade Commissioner (Latin America & Caribbean) and Consul-General, Sao-Paulo, Brasil. For services to trade and investment
- Miranda Curtis – lately Chair, CAMFED International and Lead Non-Executive Director, Foreign and Commonwealth Office. For services to gender equality globally
- Nigel Dakin – Director, Foreign, Commonwealth and Development Office. For services to British foreign policy
- Andrew Gilmour – Assistant Secretary General for Human Rights, United Nations, New York, United States of America. For services to human rights
- Mark Kent – HM Ambassador, Buenos Aires, Argentina. For services to British foreign policy
- Kara Owen – British High Commissioner, Singapore. For services to British foreign policy
- Danny Payne – Chief Executive Officer, FCDO Services. For services to the British diplomatic network overseas
- Mark Robson – Director, English and Examinations, British Council. For services to UK cultural relations
- Theo Rycroft – Director, EU Exit, Europe Directorate, Foreign, Commonwealth and Development Office. For services to British foreign policy
- Ivan Smyth – Legal Counsellor, UK Mission to the European Union, Brussels, Belgium. For services to British foreign policy
- Michael Tatham – Deputy Head of Mission, Washington, United States of America. For services to British foreign policy
- Peter Tibber – lately HM Ambassador, Bogota, Colombia. For services to British foreign policy
- Emily Walter – Director General, Foreign, Commonwealth and Development Office. For services to British foreign policy
- Dr Glenn Webby – Deputy Director, Foreign, Commonwealth and Development Office. For services to national security

=== Royal Victorian Order ===
Royal Victorian Order ribbon

==== Knight/Dame Commander of the Royal Victorian Order (KCVO/DCVO) ====
- Vice Admiral Tony Johnstone-Burt, Master of the Household
- Jonathan Roger Weatherby, lately Her Majesty′s Representative at Ascot

==== Commander of the Royal Victorian Order (CVO) ====
- Barbara Helen Kerry Francois, LVO, Director of Reservicing Operations, Master of the Household′s Department, Royal Household
- Jane Wendy Graham, LVO, Deputy Keeper of the Privy Purse
- Rear Admiral Michael Gregory, OBE, former Lord Lieutenant of Dunbartonshire
- Peter Thomas Marshall Hill, CB, for services to the Royal Household
- Carol Elizabeth Margaret Kinghorn, Lord Lieutenant of Kincardineshire
- Leonora Mary, Countess of Lichfield, LVO, Lady in Waiting to The Princess Royal
- Dr. Monica Maitland Main, Lord Lieutenant of Sutherland
- Araminta Mary Ritchie, LVO, Lady in Waiting to The Princess Royal
- Jane Mary Elizabeth Holderness-Roddam, CBE, LVO, Lady in Waiting to The Princess Royal
- Professor Sir David Philip Tweedie, Chairman, Audit, Risk and Compliance Committee, Royal Household

==== Lieutenant of the Royal Victorian Order (LVO) ====
- Steven Brian Davidson, MVO, Lately Horological Conservator, Royal Collection, Royal Household
- Dr. Grahame Clive Davies, Deputy Private Secretary to The Prince of Wales and The Duchess of Cornwall
- Stephen John Luke Davies, MVO, Lately Financial Controller, Duchy of Lancaster
- Ian Michael Grant, MVO, Acting Retail Director and Head of Product Development, Royal Collection, Royal Household
- Dr. Christopher Ian James Hartley. For services to The Duke of Edinburgh's Commonwealth Study Conferences
- Professor Zygmunt Henderson Krukowski, Lately Surgeon to The Queen in Scotland
- Commander Stephen Patrick Lacey, RN, Lately Director of Operations, Royal Travel, Royal Household
- Amy Rachel Mayes, Lately Assistant Private Secretary to The Earl and Countess of Wessex
- Minal Patel, Financial Controller of Operations, Royal Household
- Heather Lianne Salloum, Private Secretary to the Lieutenant Governor of Saskatchewan, Canada
- Lieutenant Colonel John Cochrane Stewart, Lately Adjutant, The Queen's Body Guard for Scotland, Royal Company of Archers
- Lieutenant Colonel Robert Alastair Utten Todd, Private Secretary to The Duke and Duchess of Gloucester

==== Member of the Royal Victorian Order (MVO) ====
- Lee Anthony Baldock, RVM, Chauffeur, Household of The Prince of Wales and The Duchess of Cornwall
- Joseph Bradshaw. For services to the Buckinghamshire Lieutenancy
- Inspector David Andrew Breen, Metropolitan Police Service. For services to Royalty and Specialist Protection
- Stephanie Kathleen Carlton, Lately Conservation Survey Manager, Royal Collection, Royal Household
- Caroline Ann-Marie Clarke. For services to the Norfolk Lieutenancy
- Ronald James Hayward, RVM, Lately Chauffeur, Household of The Prince of Wales and The Duchess of Cornwall
- Clive Peter Hobbs, RVM, Valet, Household of The Prince of Wales and The Duchess of Cornwall
- William Glyn Jones, Head Ranger, Balmoral Estate.
- Catherine Mary Leonard, Data Protection Manager, Royal Household.
- Stephen Matthew Murray, RVM, Yeoman of the Plate Pantry, Master of the Household's Department, Royal Household.
- Inspector Ann-Marie Nesling, Metropolitan Police Service. For services to Royalty and Specialist Protection
- Stephen Mark Niedojadlo, RVM, The Duke of Edinburgh's Page.
- Cameron Duncan Ormiston, Stock Manager, Balmoral Estate
- Sylvia Battenberg Ormiston, Pony Stud Manager, Balmoral Estate
- Professor Emeritus Roger James Taylor. For services to the Royal Collection
- Lucy Elizabeth Thorn, Interim Head of Finance, Household of The Duke and Duchess of Cambridge

Honorary

- Catharina Maria Coppens, Saddler and Harness Maker, Royal Mews, Royal Household
- Elena-Corina Motoc. For services to The Prince of Wales in Romania

=== Royal Victorian Medal (RVM) ===
Royal Victorian Medal ribbon

==== Royal Victorian Medal (Gold) ====
- Adrian John Denman, MVO, RVM, Lately Head Gardener, Royal Gardens, Windsor Castle

==== Bar to the Royal Victorian Medal (Silver) ====
- Kevin William Haylor, RVM, Lately Tractor and Machinery Operator, Crown Estate, Windsor
- Michael Alan Edward Robinson, RVM, Lately Purchasing Supervisor, Crown Estate, Windsor
- Mark Welsford, RVM, Lately Team Supervisor, Parks Department, Crown Estate, Windsor

==== Royal Victorian Medal (Silver) ====
- Sarah Louise Bailey, General Catering Assistant, Royal Household
- Derek Alexander Webster Dewar, Fire and Security Office Team Leader, Palace of Holyroodhouse
- Victor Robert Fisher, Lately Divisional Sergeant Major, The Queen's Body Guard of the Yeomen of the Guard
- Stephen Frogatt, Yeoman Warder, Her Majesty's Tower of London
- Alison Aitkenhead Gove, Retail and Admissions Assistant, Palace of Holyroodhouse
- Keith William Hanson, Lately Yeoman, The Queen's Body Guard of the Yeomen of the Guard
- Andrea Rose Marie Lopez, Assistant to the House Manager, Clarence House
- Sandra Okorefe-Onwone, Assistant to the House Manager, Clarence House
- Timothy Ian Reeves, Gardens Team Leader, Sandringham House
- Colin Smith, MBE, BEM, Yeoman Warder, Her Majesty's Tower of London
- Gary William Taylor, Lately Carpenter, Crown Estate, Windsor

=== Order of the British Empire ===
Civil division ribbon

Military division ribbon

==== Knight/Dame Commander of the Order of the British Empire (KBE/DBE) ====
Military
Civil

- Mary Rosa Alleyne Berry CBE – For services to Broadcasting, the Culinary Arts and charity
- Professor Muffy Calder OBE FRSE FREng – Vice Principal and Head, College of Science and Engineering, University of Glasgow. For services to Research and Education
- Siobhan Davies CBE – Choreographer. For services to Dance
- Dr Clare Gerada MBE – Medical Director, NHS Practitioner Health Programme and General Practitioner, Hurley Group Practice. For services to General Practice
- Victoria Mary Taylor Heywood CBE – Lately Chair, Royal Society of Arts. For services to the Arts
- Susan Hill CBE – For services to Literature
- Elaine Inglesby-Burke CBE – Chief Nursing Officer, Northern Care Alliance NHS Group. For services to Nursing
- Maureen Diane Lipman CBE – Actress. For services to charity, Entertainment and the Arts
- Linda Pollard CBE DL – Chair, Leeds Teaching Hospital NHS Trust. For services to Healthcare and the community in Northern England
- Professor Anne Marie Rafferty CBE – Professor of Nursing Policy, King's College London and President, Royal College of Nursing. For services to Nursing
- Emma Natasha Walmsley – Chief Executive Officer, GlaxoSmithKline. For services to the Pharmaceutical Industry and Business
- Professor Sarah Elizabeth Worthington QC (Hon) FBA – Downing Professor of the Laws of England, University of Cambridge. For services to English Private Law

==== Commander of the Order of the British Empire (CBE) ====
Military

- Commodore James Miles Benjamin Parkin
- Commodore James Le Seelleur Perks, OBE
- Brigadier Christopher Matthew Balmer Coles
- Colonel Charles Richard Patrick Ginn
- Colonel Andrew Nicholas Szabo
- Brigadier Neil Bryan Thorpe, OBE
- Brigadier William Stewart Codrington Wright, OBE
- Air Commodore Paul Harron Lloyd
- Air Vice-Marshal Christopher John Moore
- Air Commodore Suzanne Natalie Perkins
- Group Captain Daniel Joseph Startup
- Air Commodore Ian Jon Townsend

Civil

- Kofi Gyasi Adjepong-Boateng – Chair, Economic Justice Programme, Open Society Foundations. For services to Philanthropy
- Caroline Jane Alexander – Chief Nurse, Barts Health NHS Trust. For services to Nursing
- Joan Anita Barbara Armatrading MBE – Singer, Songwriter and Guitarist. For services to Music, charity and Equal Rights
- Jean Margaret Ashton OBE – Lately Director, Business Services and Operations, Crown Prosecution Service. For services to Law and Order
- Jane Victoria Atkinson FREng – Executive Director, Engineering and Automation, Bilfinger UK. For services to Chemical Engineering
- Suzanne Margaret Eunice Banks – Lately Chief Nurse, Sherwood Forest Hospitals NHS Foundation Trust. For services to Nursing in the NHS
- Peter Barnett – Lead Officer, Refugee Resettlement, Coventry City Council. For services to Refugees in Coventry
- William Bingham Barnett – Chief Executive, W&R Barnett Ltd. For services to Economic Development in Northern Ireland
- Margaret Eleanor Baxter OBE – Chair of Trustees, Womankind. For services to Gender Equality in the UK and Abroad
- Karen Bennett – Chief Executive Officer, Enterprise Credit Union. For services to the Credit Union Sector and Financial Inclusion
- Professor Gwenda Lynne Berry OBE – Lately Chair, Breast Cancer Now and Chair, Human Tissue Authority. For services to Civil Society and charity
- Farmida Bi – Chair, Norton Rose Fulbright (Europe, Middle East and Asia). For services to Law and charity
- Katharine Birbalsingh – Founder and Headmistress, Michaela Community School. For services to Education
- Anthony Mark Boyle – Non-Executive Chair, The Pensions Regulator. For services to the Pensions Industry
- Jacqueline Anne Brock-Doyle OBE – Executive Director, Communications, World Athletics. For services to Sport
- Michael William Tuke Brown MVO – Commissioner, Transport for London. For services to Transport
- Desmond John Michael Browne QC – Barrister. For services to the Inns of Court and Diversity at the Bar.
- Anne Bulford OBE – For services to Broadcasting and charity
- Simon Alexander Carr – Managing Director, Henry Boot Construction. For services to the Construction Industry and charity
- Matthew Carter – For services to Typography and Design
- Emma Jane Churchill – Head of Border Delivery Group, Cabinet Office. For Public services
- Cecile Yvonne Conolly – Former Headteacher. For services to Education
- Professor Brian Edward Cox OBE FRS – Professor of Particle Physics, University of Manchester. For services to the Promotion of Science
- Jeremy Cox – Executive Chair, Bermuda Monetary Authority, Bermuda. For services to the economy of Bermuda
- Judy Sarah Jarman Craymer MBE – For services to Theatre and charity
- Mary Elizabeth Curnock Cook OBE – Educationalist. For services to Further and Higher Education
- Linda Margaret Dann – Lately Head, European Bilateral Relations and EU Exit, Ministry of Defence. For services to International Relations
- Jonathan David Douglas – Chief Executive, National Literacy Trust. For services to Education
- Antony Eastaugh – Director, Immigration Enforcement, Home Office. For services to Law and Order
- Joanna Elson OBE – Chief Executive, Money Advice Trust. For services to People in Financial Difficulty
- Michael Benedict Emmerson – International Lawyer. For services to international human rights and humanitarian law
- Rebecca Ann Evans – For services to the Arts in Wales.
- Professor Amelia Fletcher OBE – Lately Non-Executive Board Member, Financial Conduct Authority and Payment Systems Regulator. For services to the Economy
- Richard David Flint – Lately Chief Executive, Yorkshire Water. For services to the Water Industry and the Environment
- Martin Frost – Co-Founder and Director, CMR Surgical. For services to Robotics
- Olivia Ruth Garfield – Chief Executive Officer, Severn Trent. For services to the Water Industry
- Warren David Gatland OBE – Lately Head Coach, Welsh Rugby Union. For services to Rugby in Wales
- Julia Caroline Gault – Head, Family, Poverty and In Work Progression Policy, Department for Work and Pensions. For public service and for services to the community in Mitcham
- Richard Gill – Chief Executive Officer, Arthur Terry Learning Partnership. For services to Education
- Richard William Gleave OBE – Ballroom Dancer. For services to Dance
- Jeffrey Charles Godfrey – Director of Legal Services, Welsh Government. For services to Devolution and the Legislative Process in Wales
- Dr Kim Sara Golding – Consultant Clinical Psychologist. For services to Children and Young People
- Johanna Clare Lindsay Harston – Deputy Director, HM Treasury. For public service
- Professor Keith Edward Hawton – Consultant Psychiatrist, Oxford Health NHS Foundation Trust and Professor of Psychiatry, University of Oxford. For services to Suicide Prevention
- Professor Anthony Edward Hill OBE – Executive Director, National Oceanography Centre. For services to Ocean and Environmental Science
- Kelly Hoppen MBE – Interior Designer and Entrepreneur. For services to the GREAT campaign
- Zuber Vali Issa – Co-Founder, EG Group. For services to Business and charity
- Mohsin Issa – Co-Founder EG Group. For services to Business and charity
- Christopher Jones – Lately Chief Executive, Dwr Cymru Welsh Water. For services to the Water Industry in England and Wales
- Dr George Kassianos – National Immunisation Lead, Royal College of General Practitioners. For services to Travel Medicine and General Practice
- Adriénne Kelbie – Chief Executive, Office for Nuclear Regulation. For services to the Nuclear Industry and to Diversity and Inclusion
- Lorraine Kelly OBE – Television Presenter. For services to Broadcasting, Journalism and charity
- Rosaleen Clare Kerslake OBE – Chief Executive, National Lottery Heritage Fund. For services to Heritage
- Mohammed Khan OBE – Leader, Blackburn with Darwen Council. For services to Local Government
- Nicolette King OBE – Lately Chair, Greenacre Academy Trust. For services to Education
- Robin Ann Lawther – Non-Executive Director, UK Government Investments. For services to Diversity and the Finance Industry
- Adrian Anthony Lester OBE – Actor. For services to Drama
- Niall Richard Mackenzie – Director, Infrastructure and Materials, Department for Business, Energy and Industrial Strategy. For services to Business and Industry
- Anne Margaret Main – Lately Member of Parliament for St Albans. For public and parliamentary service
- Professor Yadvinder Singh Malhi FRS – Professor of Ecosystem Science, University of Oxford. For services to Ecosystem Science
- Dr John David Gibson Mcadam – Chair, United Utilities Plc and Rentokil Initial Plc. For services to Business
- Maria Mcgill – Lately Chief Executive, Children's Hospices Across Scotland. For services to Palliative Care and charity
- Amanda Jane Melton – For services to Further Education
- Dr Deborah Catherine Morgan – Director, Primary Mathematics, National Centre for Excellence in Teaching Mathematics. For services to Education
- Jasper Morrison – Founder, Jasper Morrison Ltd and co-originator of the Super Normal design manifesto. For services to Design
- Professor Sa'Id Mosteshar – Director, London Institute of Space Policy and Law. For services to Space Law and Policy
- Theresa Ojo – Chief Executive, The Diana Award. For services to Young People
- Dr Ighayezomo Philip Orumwense – Lately Head of Applications, Programmes and Platforms, Commercial Directorate, Department for Work and Pensions. For public service
- Adrian Humphrey Austen Osborn – Philanthropist. For services to Education, the Arts and charity
- Neeta Patel – For services to Entrepreneurship and Technology
- Stuart Thomas Payne – Director, Supply Chain, Decommissioning and HR, Oil and Gas Authority. For services to the Oil and Gas Sector
- Richard John Pennycook – Co-Chair, British Retail Consortium. For services to Retail
- Nathan James Phillips – Lately Director, Department for Exiting the European Union. For services to Government and the Economy
- Alexander James Pienaar – Deputy Director, Northern Ireland and Negotiations, HM Revenue and Customs. For public service
- Karen Emma Pollock MBE – Chief Executive, Holocaust Educational Trust. For services to Holocaust Education
- Nicholas Mark Price – Deputy Director, Operations, Government Legal Department. For public service and for services to Diversity and Inclusion
- Samuel Alan Miles Rayner DL – Chairman, Lakeland Ltd. For services to Business and the community in Cumbria
- Lady Ruth Rogers MBE – Co-Founder, The River Cafe. For services to the Culinary Arts and charity
- Simon Gerald Routh-Jones QFSM – HM Chief Inspector, Scottish Fire and Rescue Service. For services to the Fire and Rescue Service
- Professor Sophie Kerttu Scott – Professor of Cognitive Neuroscience, University College London. For services to Neuroscience
- Robert Mark Greenhill Semple OBE – Lately Chairman, National Conservative Convention. For political service
- Siobhan Sheridan – Civilian HR Director, Ministry of Defence. For services to Ministry of Defence Personnel
- Paulette Simpson – Deputy Chair, Windrush Commemoration Committee. For services to the Caribbean community in the UK
- Matthew Smith – Chief Executive Officer, The Key Fund. For services to Social Investment
- Gareth Thomas – For services to Sport and Health
- Professor Patricia Thompson – Philanthropist. For charitable services
- David Brian Thompson – Philanthropist. For charitable services
- Linda Tomos – Librarian, National Library of Wales. For services to Welsh Culture
- Joseph Michael Tuke – Director, Local Government and Communities, Ministry for Housing, Communities and Local Government. For public service
- Dr Gillian Tully – Forensic Science Regulator. For services to Forensic Science
- Christiaan Richard David Van Der Kuyl FRSE – Chair and Co-Founder, 4J Studios. For services to the Economy
- Dr Frances Mary Walker – Artist and Printmaker. For services to Scottish Art
- Robin Watson – Chief Executive Officer, Wood Plc. For services to International Trade
- Professor David John Webb FRSE – Christison Professor of Therapeutics and Clinical Pharmacology, University of Edinburgh. For services to Clinical Pharmacology Research and Education
- Robert Webster – Chief Executive, South West Yorkshire Partnership NHS Foundation Trust. For services to Healthcare Leadership
- Professor Michael Alun West – Professor of Work and Organisational Psychology, Lancaster University. For services to Compassion and Innovation in the NHS
- Susan Whiddington – Founding Director, Mousetrap Theatre Projects. For services to Young People
- Robin Wight CVO – For services to Diversity in the Creative Industries
- Ansel Keith David Wong – For services to Arts and Culture
- Clare Eleanor Woodman – Head of EMEA, Morgan Stanley and Chief Executive Officer, Morgan Stanley & Co International Plc. For services to Finance

Honorary

==== Officer of the Order of the British Empire (OBE) ====
Military

- Commodore Robert James Anstey
- Commodore Paul Christopher Carroll
- Lieutenant Colonel (Acting Colonel) Michael Andrew Geldard. Royal Marines
- Captain Kevin Massie Noakes
- Lieutenant Colonel Hugh Ashley Philip Amos. Intelligence Corps
- Lieutenant Colonel Peter William Stanhope Baines, MBE. The Rifles
- Lieutenant Colonel Debra Jane Blackman. Intelligence Corps
- Lieutenant Colonel Alexander Vaughan Cooper, MBE. The Royal Regiment of Scotland
- Lieutenant Colonel Alex Richard Forsyth. The Royal Regiment of Scotland
- Colonel Ian Paul Gibson.
- Lieutenant Colonel John Harvey. Adjutant General's Corps (Royal Military Police)
- Lieutenant Colonel Christopher David Damien O'Halloran. Royal Regiment of Artillery
- Lieutenant Colonel Robert Balfour Poole. Royal Army Medical Corps
- Acting Colonel Clinton Mark Riley. Army Cadet Force
- Lieutenant Colonel James Samuel Skelton, MBE. The Royal Regiment of Fusiliers
- Group Captain Chantal Emma Baker
- Group Captain John Ronald Butcher
- Group Captain Mason Clark Fenlon
- Wing Commander Nicholas Donald Charles Green
- Group Captain Sonia Margaret Phythian, ARRC. Princess Mary's Royal Air Force Nursing Service
- Group Captain Ian James Sharrocks
- Surgeon Commander Sam David Hutchings
- Lieutenant Colonel Timothy John Brent
- Lieutenant Colonel Simon Thomas Horne

Civil

- Professor Ramesh Pulendran Arasaradnam – Consultant Gastroenterologist, University Hospitals Coventry and Warwickshire NHS Trust. For services to the NHS during Covid-19
- Dr Daren James Austin – Senior Fellow, GlaxoSmithKline. For services to Emergency Response during Covid-19
- Graham Barrett – Governing Governor, Her Majesty's Prison Wandsworth. For services to Her Majesty's Prison and Probation Service during Covid-19
- Lauren Jayne Batey – For services to the Protection of Vulnerable Children during Covid-19
- Tamsin Berry – Lately Director, Department of Health and Social Care. For services to Government and Life Sciences
- Dabirul Islam Choudhury – For charitable service during Covid-19
- Dr Ian Collard – lately Head of Counter-Terrorism Department, Foreign and Commonwealth Office. For services to British foreign policy and to national security
- Dr Antony Vivian Cox – Chief Executive Officer, UK BIOCentre. For services to Science and the Covid-19 response
- John Coyle – Chairman RNLI (Ireland), Trustee, RNLI (UK) and Chairman, Commissioners of Irish Lights. For services to the Royal National Lifeboat Institution, the Irish Lights and to UK/Republic of Ireland relations
- Fiona Danks – Head, Centenary Commemorations, Foreign, Commonwealth and Development Office. For services to national security
- Dr Rachael Dorothy Devlin – Group Medical Director, Health Services Laboratories and The Doctors Laboratory and Vice President of the Royal College of Pathologists. For services to Pathology during the Covid-19 response.
- Anne Donaghy – For services to Local Government and the community in County Antrim during Covid-19
- Susan Marie Doolan – Lately Governor, Her Majesty's Prison Littlehey. For services to Her Majesty's Prison and Probation Service during Covid-19
- Emma Jane Easton – Head of Voluntary Partnerships, NHS England. For services to Voluntary Healthcare during Covid-19
- Dr Rebecca Edwards – Chief Medical Officer, Falkland Islands. For services to the Falkland Islands Community
- Gaynor Susan Jean Evans – Infection, Prevention and Control Lead, NHS. For services to Infection Prevention during Covid-19
- Phillip John Charles Garrigan – Chief Fire Officer, Merseyside Fire and Rescue Service. For services to Fire and Rescue during Covid-19
- Bernhard Garside – lately HM Ambassador, San Salvador, El Salvador. For services to British foreign policy
- Ali Ghorbangholi – Co-Founder and Director of GoodSam. For services to Volunteering during the Covid-19 response
- Christopher Gillon – Team Leader, Strategic Threats Team, Foreign, Commonwealth and Development Office. For services to national security
- Israel Gloger – Director, Trust in Science Initiative. For services to UK/Argentina scientific relations
- Professor Julia Gog – Professor of Mathematical Biology, University of Cambridge and Fellow, Queens' College, Cambridge. For services to Academia and the Covid-19 response
- Cathryn Graham – Director of Music at the British Council. For services to music and to UK cultural relations
- Carl David Hardwick – Governor Her Majesty's Prison/Youth Offenders Institution Drake Hall. For services to Her Majesty's Prison and Probation Service and Women in Custody during Covid-19.
- Professor Andrew Harrison – Chief Executive Officer, Diamond Light Source Ltd. For services to Science during the Covid-19 response
- Matthew David Hood – Principal, Oak National Academy, London. For services to Education during Covid-19
- Philip Hoper – Head, Special Projects Team, Foreign, Commonwealth and Development Office. For services to national security
- Felicia Margaret Kwaku – Associate Director of Nursing, King's College NHS Foundation Trust. For services to Nursing during Covid-19
- Jan Latham Koenig – Chief Conductor, Novaya Opera, Moscow, Russia. For services to music and to UK/Russia cultural relations
- Dr Michael John Lee – Chief Medical Officer, Cayman Islands. For services to health
- Ashleigh Louise Linsdell – Founder and Coordinator, For the Love of Scrubs. For services to the NHS during the Covid-19 response
- Jeff Lynne – Musician. For services to music
- Dr Derek John Maguire – For services to Dentistry and the Covid-19 response
- Dr James Spencer Marshall – Operations Lead, Water UK. For services to the Water Sector during the Covid-19 response
- Robert Mathavious – Managing Director and Chief Executive Officer, BVI Financial Services Commission, British Virgin Islands. For services to the British Virgin Islands and to financial services
- Dr Conall Padraig Joseph McCaughey – Consultant Virologist, Belfast HSC Trust. For services to Laboratory Testing during Covid-19
- David Alexander Wilson McCredie – Chief Executive Officer, Australian British Chamber of Commerce, Sydney, Australia. For services to international trade and UK/Australia relations
- Dr Sarah Elizabeth McDonald – Biobank Manager, Medical Research Council, University of Glasgow Centre for Virus Research. For services to the Covid-19 response
- Professor Graham Francis Hassell Medley – Professor of Infectious Disease Modelling, London School of Hygiene and Tropical Medicine. For services to the Covid-19 response
- Kathleen Mohan – Chief Executive Officer, Housing Justice. For services to Vulnerable People during Covid-19
- Professor Catherine Jane Noakes – Professor of Environmental Engineering for Buildings, University of Leeds. For services to the Covid-19 response
- Ruiari O'Connell – lately HM Ambassador, Pristina, Kosovo. For services to British foreign policy
- Ndidi Okezie – Chief Executive Officer, UK Youth. For services to Young People during the Covid-19 response
- Sacha Veronica Pemberthy – Chief Executive Officer, Fair4All Finance. For services to Business during the Covid-19 response
- Francesca Elizabeth Sainsbury Perrin – Philanthropist and Founder, Indigo Trust. For charitable service particularly during Covid-19
- Adrian James Petticrew – For services to St John Ambulance (Northern Ireland) during the Covid-19 response
- Dr Alison Jane Pittard – Dean, The Faculty of Intensive Care Medicine. For services to Critical Care particularly during Covid-19
- Susan Pullen MBE – former Falkland Islands Representative in London. For services to the people of the Falkland Islands
- Jane Chantal Rickards – Chief Executive Officer, British Academy of Film and Television Arts Los Angeles, United States of America. For services to broadcasting and charity
- Anthony Ridout – Team Leader, Foreign, Commonwealth and Development Office. For services to British foreign policy
- Dr Gideon James Rubin – Assistant Director, Health Protection Research Unit for Emergency Preparedness and Response, King's College London. For services to Public Health particularly during Covid-19
- Professor Malcolm Gracie Semple – Professor of Child Health and Outbreak Medicine, University of Liverpool and Consultant Respiratory Paediatrician, Alder Hey Children's Hospital. For services to the Covid-19 response
- Carol Ann Shanahan – Founder and Trustee, The Hubb Foundation. For services to the community in Stoke-on-Trent during the Covid-19 response
- Dr Ian Singleton – Director of Conservation, PanEco Foundation/Sumatran Orangutan Conservation Programme, Indonesia. For services to the environment and conservation
- Professor Timothy David Spector – Professor of Genetic Epidemiology, King's College London. For services to the Covid-19 response
- Ganeshalingam Suntharalingam – President, Intensive Care Society & Consultant, London North West University Healthcare. For services to the NHS during Covid-19
- Suzanne Nicola Sweeney – Network Lead, London Neonatal Network and Area Chair, Sea Cadets. For services to Neonatal Provision in the NHS and to the Sea Cadets particularly during Covid-19
- James Taylor – Group Leader, Defence Science and Technology Laboratory. For services to the NHS during Covid-19
- Adam Tee – Team Leader, Foreign, Commonwealth and Development Office. For services to British foreign policy
- David Mark Thomas – Principal, Jane Austen College and Curriculum Lead, Oak National Academy. For services to Education particularly during Covid-19
- Professor Emma Thomson – Professor of Infectious Diseases and Consultant Virologist, University of Glasgow Centre for Virus Research. For services to the NHS during the Covid-19 response
- Emer Timmons – former President, Strategic Deals and Customer Engagement, BT Global Services UK. For services to Women and to Equality
- Dr John Walker – lately Head, Arms Control & Disarmament Research, Foreign and Commonwealth Office. For services to British foreign policy
- Professor Ann Sarah Walker – Professor, University of Oxford and University College London. For services to Academia and the Covid-19 response
- Susan Mary Williams – Matron, Royal Hospital Chelsea. For services to Patients during the Covid-19 response
- Professor Mark Howard Wilson – Co-founder and Director of GoodSAM. For services to charity and the Covid-19 response
- Laura Winningham – Chief Executive Officer, City Harvest London. For services to the community in London during the Covid-19 response
- Philip Wood – President of British New Zealand Business Association, Wellington, New Zealand. For services to British business in New Zealand
- Professor Lucy Yardley – Professor of Health Psychology, University of Bristol and University of Southampton. For services to the Covid-19 response
- Dr Jeffrey Adams – Section Head, Forensic Science Regulation Unit, Home Office. For services to Forensic Science
- Abu Ahmed – Head, Local Delivery and Communications, Office for Security and Counter Terrorism, Home Office. For public service
- John Mark Ainsley – Operatic Tenor. For services to Music
- Caron Andrea Alexander – Lately Director, Digital Shared Services, Grade 5, Department of Finance. For services to Government and the IT industry in Northern Ireland
- Geraldine Allinson – For services to Local Media in Kent
- Christopher Armitt QPM – Deputy Chief Constable, Civil Nuclear Constabulary. For services to the Civil and Nuclear Industry
- Charles Albert Armstrong – Chief Executive, Scottish Fishermen's Federation. For services to the British Fishing Industry
- Christopher Richard Thompson Askew – Chief Executive, Diabetes UK. For services to People with Diabetes
- Catherine Jane Atkinson – Data Science Team Leader, Department for Business, Energy and Industrial Strategy. For services to Data Science
- Ayodele Idowu Awoyungbo – Senior Crown Prosecutor, International Unit, Crown Prosecution Service. For services to Law and Order
- Joshua Thomas Aderele Babarinde – Founder and Chief Executive Officer, Cracked It. For services to Criminal Justice, Social Enterprise and the Economy
- Steven Baker – Executive Headteacher, Aspire Schools Federation. For services to Education
- David Ball – Chair of Trustees, Rosemary Appeal. For voluntary and charitable services
- David John Bamford – Lately Governor, HM Prison Brixton. For services to HM Prison and Probation Service
- Paul Frederick Barry-Walsh – For services to Enterprise and charity
- Johnathan Bates – Analytical Team Leader, Department of Health and Social Care. For public service
- Kevin John Baughan – Lately Deputy Chief Executive Officer, Innovate UK. For services to Innovation and Skills Development
- Sarah Frances (Sally) Beamish FRSE – Composer. For services to Music
- Caroline Wynne Beasley-Murray JP – HM Senior Coroner for Essex. For services HM Coroners' Service
- Hazel Ruth Bell – Chair, Choice Housing Ireland Limited. For services to Social Housing in Northern Ireland
- Kate Rachel Bennett – Lately Senior Private Secretary, Department for Exiting the EU. For public service
- Professor Debra Elizabeth Bick – Professor of Clinical Trials in Maternal Health, University of Warwick. For services to Midwifery
- Lilian Clara Alexandra Black – Chair, Holocaust Survivors Friendship Association. For services to Holocaust Education
- Philipa Bragman – Founder and lately Director, CHANGE. For services to People with Learning Disabilities
- Gordon Wilson Bridge – For services to the community in South Yorkshire
- Sandy Brown – National Leader of Education. For services to Education
- Emma Victoria Burgess – Senior Lawyer, Ministry of Justice Legal Team, Government Legal Department. For services to International Relations
- Barbara Bush – Lately HR Director, The Pensions Regulator. For services to the Pensions Industry, Diversity and charity
- Alexander Campbell – Chief Executive, Queen Victoria Seamen's Rest. For services to charity
- Peter Cardy – For services to the community in Gosport, Hampshire
- James Carpy – Head, Iraq Team, Department for International Development. For services to International Development in Iraq
- Carol Anne Carson – Volunteer Nurse, Voluntary Service Overseas. For services to Healthcare
- Dr Deesha Chadha – Co-Chair, Faiths Forum for London. For services to Faith communities
- Herminder Kaur Channa JP – Principal, Ark Boulton Academy. For services to Education
- Adrienne Pamela Cherrywood – Founder and Headteacher, Cressey College, Croydon. For services to Children and Young People with Special Educational Needs and Disabilities
- Yasmine Chinwala – Partner, New Financial, HM Treasury. For services to the HM Treasury Women in Finance Charter
- Patricia Ann Chrimes – Chair, Royal British Legion Women's Section. For services to Ex-Service Personnel
- Professor Marta Cecilia Cohen – Clinical Director, Pharmacy Diagnostics and Genetics and Head, Histopathology Department, Sheffield Children's NHS Foundation Trust. For services to the Treatment of Sudden Infant Death Syndrome
- Richard David Collier-Keywood – Chair of the Board, School for Social Entrepreneurs. For services to Social Enterprise
- John Kevin Connolly – For services to Renal Transplantation in Northern Ireland
- Mary Louise Contini – For services to the Scottish Food Industry and Scottish-Italian Relations
- Shirley Cooper – For services to Equality, Women's Empowerment and Procurement
- Paulette Cope – Project Manager, Phoenix II, Land Equipment, Ministry of Defence. For services to Ministry of Defence
- Deborah Samantha Cropanese – Delivery Director, National Business Centres, HM Courts and Tribunals Service. For public service
- Carol Ann Culley – Deputy Chief Executive and City Treasurer, Manchester City Council. For services to Local Government
- John Morgan D'Arcy – National Director, Open University. For services to Education and the Arts
- Lyn Dance – Headteacher, The Milestone School and Chief Executive Officer, SAND Academies Trust. For services to Education
- Professor Nicholas Daniel – Oboist. For services to Music
- Professor Gail Davey – Professor of Global Health Epidemiology, Brighton and Sussex Medical School. For services to tackling Neglected Tropical Diseases
- Professor Julia Claire Davidson – Director, Online Harms and Cyber Crime Unit, University of East London. For services to Online Safety
- Professor Jennifer Catriona Davidson – For services to the Care and Protection of Children and Young People in Scotland and Abroad
- Timothy James Dawson – Chief Executive Officer, SkyDemon. For services to Aviation Safety
- Ian Edwin Dilks – Chair, NHS Resolution. For services to the NHS
- John Aloysius Docherty – Headteacher, St Ninian's High School, East Renfrewshire. For services to Education
- Melanie Doel (Melanie Davies) – For services to Journalism, charity and the community in Wales
- Thomas Matthew Innes Drew – Head, Data and Innovation, Office for Security and Counter Terrorism, Home Office. For public service
- Rosemary Ann Drinkwater – For services to Higher Education, Innovation and Enterprise in the West Midlands
- Mark William Dudfield – Project Lead, Illuminate, HM Revenue and Customs. For public service
- Graham John Duxbury – Chief Executive, Groundwork UK. For services to Communities and the Environment in the UK
- Roland Rennie Alistair Eadie – For services to the community in County Fermanagh
- Carolann Edwards – For services to Disadvantaged People in the UK and South Africa
- Mark Timothy Jon Enzer – Chair, Digital Framework Task Group and Chief Technical Officer, Mott MacDonald. For services to the National Infrastructure
- Christopher Martin Evans – Constructive Engineer, Ministry of Defence. For services to Naval Engineering
- David Evans – Member, Flintshire Council. For public service
- Bernardine Anne Mobolaji Evaristo MBE – Author. For services to Literature
- Shaun Alan Fenton – Headteacher, Reigate Grammar School, Surrey. For services to Education
- Jacqueline Ruth Findlay – Lately Regional Tribunal Judge, HM Courts and Tribunals Service. For services to the Administration of Justice
- Hedley John Finn MBE – Founder, Radio Lollipop International. For services to Children in Hospital
- Colin Flack – Lately Chair, Rail Alliance. For services to the Rail Supply Industry
- Jacqueline Fletcher – Senior Nurse Advisor, Stop the Pressure Programme, NHS England and NHS Improvement. For services to Wound Care Management
- Richard Forsyth – Chair, Forsyth's Ltd. For services to the Distillation and Oil and Gas Industries and the community in Speyside, Scottish Highlands
- Marie Gentles – Lately Headteacher, Hawkswood Primary Pupil Referral Unit, London. For services to Education
- Professor Christianne Glossop – Chief Veterinary Officer for Wales. For services to Animal Health and Welfare
- Marcella Goligher-Martin – Governor, HM Prison Humber. For services to Criminal Justice
- Professor Cathy Gormley-Heenan – Deputy Vice-Chancellor (Research and Impact), Ulster University. For services to Higher Education
- Professor Stephen John Haake – Professor of Sports Engineering, Sheffield Hallam University. For services to Sport
- Gareth Morgan Hadley – Chair, General Optical Council. For services to the Optical Sector
- Daniel Hahn – For services to Literature
- Max William Von Furer Haimendorf – Principal, Ark King Solomon Academy, Westminster. For services to Education
- Pamela Theresa Hall – President, National Conservative Convention. For public and political service
- Charles Graham Hammond – For services to the UK Ports Industry and Business in Scotland
- Dominique Marie Hardy – Lately Regional Director, Asia-Pacific, UK Visas and Immigration, Home Office. For public service
- Michael Ross Harris – Trustee and Treasurer, Comic Relief. For voluntary and charitable services
- Fiona Harrison – Intelligence Analyst, Risk and Intelligence Services, HM Revenue and Customs. For services to Tackling Fraud
- Anthony Peter Hatch – For services to Music and charity
- Richard Charles Hawkes – Chief Executive, British Asian Trust. For services to the Charitable Sector
- David George Heeley – For services to Charitable Fundraising
- Dr Grahaeme Henderson – For services to the International Shipping Industry
- Christopher James Hindley – Chief Executive, Youth Fed. For services to Young People in North West England
- Caroline Hoddinott – Lately Executive Headteacher, Haybridge School and Sixth Form, Hagley. For services to Education
- Dr Lesley Karen Holdsworth – Physiotherapist and National Clinical Lead for Digital Health and Care, Scottish Government and Glasgow Caledonian University. For services to Physiotherapy and Health Services
- David Samuel John Holmes – Manufacturing Director, BAE Systems Air Sector. For services to Aerospace Manufacturing
- Lee Thomas Howell QFSM – Chief Fire Officer, Devon and Somerset Fire and Rescue Service. For services to the Fire and Rescue Service
- Muhammad Naveed Idrees – Headteacher, Feversham Primary Academy, Bradford. For services to Education
- Julie Deborah Iles – President, Conservative Women's Organisation. For public and political service
- Georgina Kate Jackson – Development Director, Sold Out. For services to Education and Diversity in the Video Games Industry
- Danny Jeyasingam – For services to Governance and Devolution
- Anita Johnson – Headteacher, Loxford School of Science and Technology and Chief Executive Officer, Loxford School Trust. For services to Education
- Stephen Martin Johnston – Economic Adviser, Trade Remedies and Disputes, Department for International Trade. For services to International Trade
- Fiona Jane Jones – Universal Credit Group Director for Wales and Lead, National Employer and Partnership Team, Work and Health Services, Department for Work and Pensions. For services to Unemployed People in Wales
- Jonathon Glyn Jones – Managing Director of Trading, Tregothnan. For services to International Trade and Commerce
- Kim Niklas Jones – Fashion Designer, Christian Dior. For services to Fashion
- Alun Wyn Jones – For services to Rugby Union Football in Wales
- Natalie Claire Constance Jones – Delivery Director, EU Exit Programme, Home Office. For public service
- Rick Jones – Team Leader, Ministry of Defence. For services to Defence
- Allison Mackie Kennedy – Headteacher, Knightsridge Primary School, Livingston. For services to Education in West Lothian
- Jane Hope Kennedy – Architect, Purcell UK. For services to Conservation Architecture
- Richard Kenney – President, Commonwealth Judo Association. For services to Judo
- Laura Kiddoo – Senior Policy Adviser, HM Treasury. For services to EU Exit
- Samantha Clare King – Manager, Marine Environment, Natural England. For services to Marine Conservation
- Professor Charles James Knight – Chief Executive, St Bartholomew's Hospital, Clinical Director and Consultant Cardiologist, Barts Health NHS Trust. For services to the NHS and People with Heart Disease
- Paul Anthony Lee DL – Chairman, Horserace Betting Levy Board. For services to Horse Racing
- Professor Cheryl Ann Lenney – Chief Nurse, Manchester University NHS Foundation Trust. For services to Nursing and Midwifery
- Professor Jason Anthony Lowe – Head, Climate Services for Government, Meteorological Office. For services to Climate Science
- Nigel Lugg – Chairman, UK Fashion and Textiles Association. For services to the Fashion and Textiles Industries
- Juliet Madeline Mabey – Publisher. For services to Publishing
- Neil Andrew Macdonald – Pro Chancellor, Sheffield Hallam University. For services to Education and Business
- Kirsten Nicola Mackey – Managing Director, Citizenship and Consumer Affairs, Barclays UK. For services to Financial Services and Young People
- Ian Marcus – Commissioner, Crown Estate. For service to the Economy
- Olivia Ruth Marks-Woldman – Chief Executive, Holocaust Memorial Day Trust. For services to Holocaust and Genocide Education and Commemoration
- Dr Carol Marsh – Deputy Head of Electronics Engineering, Leonardo. For services to Diversity and Inclusion in Electronic Engineering
- Sally Margaret Mcgregor (Grantham Mcgregor) – Emeritus Professor of Child Health and Nutrition, Institute of Child Health, University College London. For services to Early Childhood Development in Developing Countries
- Dr Lucy Katrina Mcleay – Programme Director, Euratom Exit Programme, Department for Business, Energy and Industrial Strategy. For services to Energy Policy
- Alan Mcrae – Lately President, Scottish Football Association. For services to Grassroots and Professional Football
- Clive Allan James Memmott – Chief Executive, Greater Manchester Chamber of Commerce and lately Non-Executive Director, British Chambers of Commerce. For services to Business
- Professor Paul Meredith – Senior Cymru Professor in Sustained Advanced Materials, Swansea University. For services to Semiconductor Research and Innovation
- Rabbi David Meyer – Executive Director, Partnership for Jewish Schools. For services to Education
- Ali Akbar Mohammed – Founder and Trustee, Ansar Finance. For services to Finance and charity
- Martin John Edward Moorman – Headteacher, Ravenscliffe High School and Sports College. For services to Young People with Special Educational Needs and Disabilities in Calderdale, West Yorkshire
- Christopher John Leon Moorsom – For charitable services in South West England and Wales
- Professor Dion Gregory Morton – Barling Professor of Surgery, University of Birmingham. For services to Innovation in the NHS
- Dr Sarah Nelson – Research Associate, Centre for Research on Families and Relationships, University of Edinburgh. For services to Victims of Childhood Sexual Abuse
- Dr Sanjiv Nichani – Founder and Chief Executive Officer, Healing Little Hearts. For services to Medicine and charity
- Mehri Niknam MBE – For services to Jewish-Muslim Inter Faith Relations
- Carol Lesley O'Brien – Lately Board Member, Road Haulage Association. For services to Diversity and Inclusion in the Transport Industry
- Dr Deborah Antoinette O'Neil – Chief Executive Officer, Novabiotics Ltd. For services to Biotechnology, Business and charity
- Muyiwa Olarewaju – Gospel Singer. For services to Music
- Julie Oldham MBE – Head of Library and Museum Services, Bolton Council. For services to Public Libraries
- Henry Stuart Owen-John – For services to Heritage Protection
- Professor Miles John Padgett FRSE FRS – Kelvin Chair of Natural Philosophy, Glasgow University. For services to Scientific Research and Outreach
- Alpesh Bipin Patel – Founder, Praefinium Partners. For services to the Economy and International Trade
- Alison Paul – Headteacher, Brimble Hill Special School, Swindon. For services to Education
- Professor Michael David Peake – Hon. Professor of Respiratory Medicine, University of Leicester and Lately Clinical Lead for Early Diagnosis, National Cancer Registration and Analysis Service. For services to Medicine
- William John Perrin – Trustee, Carnegie UK Trust, Good Things Foundation, Indigo Trust and 360 Giving. For services to Technology and Internet Safety Policy
- David William Petherick – Lately Chair, Committee B/559, British Standards Institute. For services to People with Disabilities
- Tobias Grant Peyton-Jones – Education and Skills Ambassador, Siemens UK. For services to Education, Skills and Young People
- Jeffrey Pinnick – For services to Holocaust Commemoration and Education
- Professor Simon James Trent Pollard FREng – Pro Vice-Chancellor, Cranfield University. For services to Environmental Risk Management
- Timothy Andrew Porter – Director of Programmes, The HALO Trust. For services to International Development
- Andrew James Price – Security Manager, Heathrow Airport. For services to Aviation Security
- Sara Victoria Protheroe – Chief Customer Officer, Pension Protection Fund. For services to Pensioners
- Sarabjit Singh Purewal – Principal Specialist Inspector, Health and Safety Executive. For services to Health and Safety and to Cyber Security
- Professor Sheena Elizabeth Radford – Astbury Professor of Biophysics, University of Leeds. For services to Molecular Biology Research
- Luthfur Rahman – Executive Member for Culture and Leisure, Manchester City Council. For services to Local Government
- Graham Douglas Ralph – Lately District Operations Manager, Work and Health Directorate, Department for Work and Pensions. For public service
- Charlotte Helen Ramsden – Strategic Director for People, Salford City Council. For services to Children in Greater Manchester
- Imran Rasul – Professor of Economics, University College London. For services to Social Sciences
- Nicola Rees-Lamb (Norman) – Acting Chief Executive, Women's Aid Federation of England. For services to the Prevention of Violence Against Women and Girls
- Professor Stefan Clive Reif – Founder and lately Director, Taylor-Schechter Genizah Research Unit, University of Cambridge. For services to Scholarship
- Ahmereen Reza – Founder and Trustee, Developments in Literacy Trust, and Director, Conservative Friends of Pakistan. For public and political service, and Interfaith Work
- Gary Richardson QPM – Detective Superintendent, British Transport Police. For services to Policing
- Alison Ruth Ring – Lately, Commissioners' Advisory Accountant, HM Revenue and Customs. For services to Accountancy
- Philippa Charlotte Grace Saunders – Assistant Private Secretary to the Prime Minister, 10 Downing Street. For services to British Trade Policy
- Professor Gillian Louise Schofield – Professor, Child and Family Social Work, University of East Anglia. For services to Children and Families
- Professor Paul Seawright – Executive Dean, Faculty of Arts, Humanities and Social Sciences, Ulster University. For services to Higher Education and the Arts
- Professor Nilay Shah FREng – Professor of Chemical Engineering, Imperial College London. For services to the Decarbonisation of the UK Economy
- Anant Meghji Pethraj Shah – For services to Education, Health and Animal Welfare
- Dr Nicola Sharp-Jeffs – Founder, Surviving Economic Abuse. For services to Victims of Domestic and Economic Abuse
- Professor Sally Ann Shearer – Executive Director of Nursing, Sheffield Children's NHS Foundation Trust. For services to Nursing
- Farouq Rashid Sheikh – Founder, CareTech. For services to Specialist Social Care
- Dr Graham John Shortland – Consultant Paediatrician, Cardiff and Vale University Health Board. For services to Paediatrics, Patient Safety and the NHS in Wales
- Fayann Louise Veronica Simpson – Group Board Member and Chair, Resident Services Group, London and Quadrant Housing Association. For services to Tenants in Social Housing
- Margaret Joyce Simpson – Director General, Rail Freight Group. For services to the Rail Freight Sector
- Helen Mary Simpson – Trustee, St Martin-in-the-Fields Charity. For services to charity
- Dr André Felix Vitus Singer – Chief Executive Officer and Creative Director, Spring Films. For services to Anthropology and the Documentary Film Industry
- Dr Philip Bryan Robert Smith – Executive Principal, Outwood Academy Portland. For services to Education
- Tanja Harriet Smith – Technical Director, Gradon Architecture. For services to Apprenticeships and Technical Education
- John Frank Smith – For services to Music
- David William Smith – Deputy Director, Border Force, Home Office. For services to EU Exit Preparation and Border Security
- Dr Vaughan Robert Southgate DL – For services to the community in Bedfordshire
- Ruth Anne Stevenson – Faculty Head of Performing Arts, Castlemilk High School. For services to Education in Glasgow
- Peter James Stevenson – Chief Policy Adviser, Compassion in World Farming. For services to Farm Animal Welfare
- Mandie Stravino – For services to Education
- Andrew Christopher Stylianou – Chief Operating Officer, Sky UK and Ireland. For services to Diversity and the Economy
- Professor Catherine Sudlow FRSE – Professor of Neurology and Clinical Epidemiology, University of Edinburgh, Director of BHF Data Science Centre, Health Data Research UK, and lately Chief Scientist, UK Biobank. For services to Medical Research
- Janet Claire Thompson – Headteacher, Dorothy Goodman School, Hinckley. For services to Education
- Sian Elizabeth Thornhill – Director of Education, Harrow International Schools and Lately Executive Principal, Skinners' Kent Academy Trust. For services to Education
- Dr Mark Gerald Timoney – Lately Chief Pharmaceutical Officer, Department of Health. For services to Pharmacy
- Kate Trenaman – Team Leader, Ministry of Defence. For services to Defence
- Barbara Kay Tudor – Victim Liaison Manager, National Probation Service, HM Prison. For services to Victims of Crime
- Mohammed Nizam Uddin – Senior Head, Mosaic, The Prince's Trust. For services to Social Mobility and Community Integration
- Lesley Anne Upton – Payments Technical Lead, HM Revenue and Customs. For public service
- Elizabeth Terese Vega – Group Chief Executive Officer, Informed Solutions. For services to International Trade and Digital Transformation
- Keith Vinning – Business Developer, Pilot Aware. For services to Aviation Safety
- Professor Jackline Wahba – Professor of Economics, University of Southampton. For services to Economic Policy
- Sally Anne Wainwright – For services to Writing and Television
- Dawn Jacinta Walton – For services to Theatre
- Sally Elizabeth Waples – Sexual Harassment and Personal Safety Lead, Women's Network, Department for International Development. For services to Inclusion
- Maria Wardrobe – Lately Director of Communications and External Relations, National Energy Action. For services to Tackling Fuel Poverty
- Rebecca Jane Warren – For services to Art
- Richard James Alexander Wates – For charitable services to Children and Young People with Disabilities
- Professor Sheryl Dianne Watkins – Professor of Public Health Nursing, Cardiff University. For services to Nursing Education and Research
- Christopher Charles Watts – Lately Deputy Director, National Security, Department for Transport. For public service
- Dr Hannah Jill White – Deputy Director, Institute for Government. For services to the Constitution
- Jane White – Adviser, Secondary Legislation Scrutiny Committee, House of Lords. For services to Parliament
- Michael Ian Whittingham – Director of High Performance, SportScotland Institute of Sport. For services to Sport
- Dr Lynne Wigens – Lately Chief Nurse, East of England Region, NHS England and NHS Improvement. For services to Nursing
- Roger Vincent Wiglesworth DL – For voluntary and charitable services
- Kathryn Charlotte Louise Willard – Lately Director, Stobart Group. For services to Transport and the Economy
- Professor Charlotte Williams – Professor of Inorganic Chemistry, University of Oxford. For services to Chemistry
- Euryn Ogwen Williams – For services to Welsh Broadcasting
- Gwyneth Williams – For services to Radio and Broadcasting
- Professor Lorna Margaret Woods – For services to Internet Safety Policy
- Ian Charles Yarnold – Head, International Vehicle Standards, Department for Transport. For services to Transport and Engineering

Honorary

==== Member of the Order of the British Empire (MBE) ====
Military

Civil

COVID-19

- Lorraine Abernethy – For services to Paediatric Occupational Therapy and the Covid-19 response
- Jayne Adamson – Volunteer Suicide Lead, Believe Housing. For services to Housing and Suicide Prevention particularly during Covid-19
- Sufina Ahmad – Director, John Ellerman Foundation. For charitable service particularly during Covid-19
- Hans Ahmed – Sessional Muslim Imam, Her Majesty's Prison/Youth Offenders Institution Brinsford. For services to Her Majesty's Prison and Probation Service during Covid-19
- Denise Elizabeth Catherine Allan – Managing Director of Customer Service, Sky Uk. For services to the Telecommunications Industry during Covid-19
- Sheridan Ash – Founder, TechSheCan. For services to Young Girls and Women through Technology particularly during Covid-19
- Professor Tim Baker – Engineer, University College London. For services to Healthcare in the UK and Abroad during Covid-19
- Lucy Gemma Baker – Service Technology Director, BT. For services to the NHS during Covid-19
- Geoffrey Francis Maitland Ball – For services to the community in Ellesmere Port, Cheshire during Covid-19
- Sarah Elizabeth Beale – For services to Girls and Young Women during COVID-19
- Melanie Jane Beck – Chief Executive Officer, MyMiltonKeynes. For services to the community during Covid-19
- Harmohinder Singh Bhatia – For services to Race Relations in the West Midlands particularly during Covid-19
- Zahid Hussain Bhatti – Managing Chaplain, Her Majesty's Prison Wormwood Scrubs. For services to Her Majesty's Prison and Probation Service during Covid-19.
- Michael Andrew Biggar – For services to charity and the NHS during the Covid-19 response
- Sarah Bowern – Deputy Head, Costume Department, English National Opera. For services to the Opera and Charity
- Rachel Louise Bowes – Assistant Director for Care and Support, North Yorkshire County Council. For services to the community during the Covid-19 response
- Collieson Briggs – For services to Vulnerable people in the community of Fife during the Covid-19 response.
- Captain Caroline Lesley Brophy-Parkin – For services to the community in Hawick during the Covid-19 response
- Leone Catherine Burns – For services to Health and Social Care during Covid-19
- Matthew William Burrows – Artist and Founder, ArtistsSupportPledge. For services to the Arts during the Covid-19 response
- Tina Butler – Head of Commercial and Procurement, Kent Fire and Rescue Service. For services to the Covid-19 response
- Lurine Lilian Cato – For services to Charity and Music
- Debbie Caulfield BEM – For services to the community in Londonderry during the Covid-19 response
- Oliver Luke Chambers – For services to the community in Birmingham, West Midlands during Covid-19
- Dr Sarbjit Clare – Deputy Medical Director, Clinical Lead Acute Medicine, Sandwell and West Birmingham NHS Trust. For services to the NHS during Covid-19
- Trevor Stephen Cockings – For services to Food Provision in the UK during the Covid-19 response
- Amelia Collins-Patel – For voluntary services to Children and Young People in the community during Covid-19.
- Simon Edward Constable – Railway worker, Network Rail. For services to the Rail Industry during Covid-19
- Christopher Conway – Charity Ambassador, Network Rail. For services to the Homeless particularly during Covid-19
- Dr Michelle Cooper – Chief Executive Officer, County Durham Community Foundation. For services to the community during Covid-19
- Sandeep Singh Daheley – For services to the Sikh community during Covid-19
- Stuart Graham Dark – Cabinet Member, West Norfolk Council Covid-19 Emergency Response Team. For services to the community in Snettisham, Norfolk during Covid-19
- Jane Davenport – Headteacher, Reynalds Cross School. For services to Young People with Special Educational Needs and Disabilities particularly during Covid-19
- Samantha Jane Davies – For services to the community in Queens Edith's, Cambridgeshire particularly during Covid-19
- Gareth Davies – Instructor, Sea Cadets. For services to the community in Scarborough, North Yorkshire during Covid-19
- Dr Eleri Mair Jones Davies – Consult Medical Microbiologist and Director, Infection Prevention and Control, Public Health Wales. For services to Healthcare in Wales particularly during Covid-19
- Kathryn Elizabeth Davies – Branch employee, The Co-operative Bank. For services to the community in Greater Manchester during Covid-19
- Imran Rashid Davji – Human Resource Administrator, Asda Ltd. For services to the Covid-19 response
- Carrie Deacon – Head of Social Action Innovation and Director of Government and Community Innovation, Nesta. For services to Social Action during Covid-19
- Professor Christian Delles – Professor of Cardiovascular Prevention, University of Glasgow. For services to the NHS during Covid-19
- Brendan John Doyle – Prison Officer, Her Majesty's Prison Coldingley. For services to Her Majesty's Prison and Probation Service during Covid-19.
- Professor Paul Elkington – Professor of Respiratory Medicine, Southampton University. For services to Medicine particularly during Covid-19
- Michele Elliott – Divisional Director, Barking, Havering and Redbridge University Hospitals NHS Trust. For services to Nursing particularly during Covid-19
- Trevor Elliott – Residential Home Manager, Ladywell Children's Home. For services to Vulnerable Children particularly during Covid-19
- Derrick Errol Evans – For services to Health and Fitness
- Ijeoma Nwamaka Ezeilo – Telecommunications, Sky UK. For services to the Telecommunications Industry during Covid-19
- Stuart Fearn – Head of Customer Contact, Newcastle Building Society. For services to the community in Newcastle and the North East during Covid-19
- Paul Findlay – For charitable service particularly during Covid-19
- Johnny James Flynn – Host, Virtual Pub Quiz. For charitable service during Covid-19
- Gary Frith – Health and Safety Advisor, Her Majesty's Prison Hindley. For services to Prison Staff, their Families and Prisoners during Covid-19.
- Susan Gault – Head of Public Health Nursing, Northern Trust. For services to Healthcare particularly during Covid-19
- Nicole Geraghty – Maintenance Scheduler, Briggs Marine. For services to the community during Covid-19
- Laura Jane Gill (Higgins) – Head of Strategy and Portfolio, National Crime Agency. For services to the Covid-19 response
- Adam James Gordon – Mobile Network Engineer, Ericsson. For services to the Telecommunications Industry during Covid-19
- Philip Nesbit Graham – Signalling Volunteer, Network Rail. For services to the Rail Industry particularly during Covid-19
- Clare Griffin – For services to the community on the Isle of Wight particularly during Covid-19
- Philippa Groves – For services to the community in Cumbria particularly during Covid-19
- Ian James Hammond – Senior Manager, BT. For services to the NHS during the Covid-19 response
- Jatinder Singh Harchowal – Chief Pharmacist and Head of Quality Improvement, The Royal Marsden NHS Foundation Trust. For services to the Pharmaceutical Profession particularly during Covid-19
- Peter John Harding – Team Member, TalkTalk Business Team. For services to Critical National Infrastructure during the Covid-19 response
- Jacqueline Elizabeth Harris – Service Centre Manager, Belfast Region. For services to the Delivery of Social Security in Northern Ireland during Covid-19
- Barnabas Thomas Guy Haughton – For services to the community in Bristol particularly during Covid-19
- Jane Ann Havenhand – For services to the community in Dinnington, South Yorkshire particularly during Covid-19
- John Henry Hayday – Security and Business Continuity Director, BT. For services to the Telecommunications Industry during Covid-19
- Malcolm James Healey – Campaign Co-ordinator, PPE4NHS. For services to the NHS during Covid-19
- Michael Hind – For services to the community of Teesside during Covid-19
- Rev. Canon David Paul Hoey – For services to the community in Eglington, Londonderry during Covid-19
- Manvir Hothi – Social Worker, Hammersmith and Fulham Council. For services to Social Care particularly during Covid-19
- Jean Marie Hughes – Retail Worker, The Co-operative Group. For services to the Food Supply Chain during Covid-19
- David James Adams Hughes JP – For services to the NHS and the Bereaved during Covid-19
- Marie-Ann Jackson – Head, Stronger Communities Programme, North Yorkshire County Council. For services to the community during Covid-19
- Kay Johnson – For services to Food Nutrition and the community in Lancashire particularly during Covid-19
- Paul Anthony Jones – Chief Officer, Denby Dale Centre. For services to Older People and the community in Kirklees, West Yorkshire during Covid-19
- Rebecca Emma Dorothy Kennelly – Director of Volunteering, Royal Voluntary Service. For services to the Covid-19 response
- Oli Khan – For services to the Hospitality Industry and charity in the UK and Abroad particularly during Covid-19
- Dr Matthew Jamie Knight – Respiratory Consultant, West Hertfordshire Hospitals NHS Trust. For services to the NHS particularly during Covid-19
- Sanjeev Kumar – For services to the BAME community during Covid-19.
- Dr Jonathan Tat Chee Kwan – Divisional Medical Director, Dartford and Gravesham NHS Trust. For services to the NHS particularly during Covid-19
- Anthony Leslie Larsen – For services to Operational Law Enforcement during Covid-19
- Graeme Allan Lawrie – Partnerships Director, ACS International Schools. For services to Education particularly during Covid-19
- Dr Thomas Oldroyd Lawton – Consultant in Anaesthesia and Critical Care, Bradford Teaching Hospitals NHS Foundation Trust. For services to the NHS during Covid-19
- Caroline Mary Lee – Head, Clinical Education Centre for Nurses, Midwives and Allied Health Professions. For services to Healthcare during the Covid-19 response
- Andrew Richard Lord – Chief Executive Officer, Alabare. For services to the community in Wiltshire particularly during Covid-19
- Dr Dominque Nuala Lucas – Consultant Anaesthetist and Lead for Obstetric Anaesthesia, London North West University Healthcare NHS Trust. For services to Anaesthesia during Covid-19
- Christopher John Luff – For services to the community in Watford, Hertfordshire during Covid-19
- Dr Carey Jane Lunan – For services to Healthcare in Scotland during the Covid-19 response
- Gail Margaret Lusardi – For services to Health and Social Care in Wales particularly during Covid-19
- Jane Geraldine Lyons – Chair, The Friends of St Michael's Hospice, Basingstoke. For services to charitable fundraising during Covid-19
- Hector Donald Macaulay – For services to Construction and the NHS during Covid-19
- Duncan Mackay – For services to Construction and the NHS during Covid-19.
- Ian Lowry Cole Maclean – Managing Director, John Smedley Ltd. For services to the Textile Industry and the Covid-19 response
- William Macleod – Founder and Chief Operations Officer, Veterans in Action. For services to Veterans during Covid-19.
- David Maguire – For services to the community in Glasgow during the Covid-19 response
- Gareth James Mallion – Network Rail employee. For services to the NHS during Covid-19
- Peter William Martin – Field Based Co-ordinator, BT Openreach. For services to Telecommunications during Covid-19
- Patricia Vivien Mayle – Support Leader, Greater Manchester West. For services to Girlguiding and to the Covid-19 response.
- Kathleen Margaret Mcgrath – Home Manager, Andersons. For services to Older People in Moray during Covid-19
- Elizabeth Joan Mcgrogan – For services to the community in Northern Ireland during Covid-19
- Jack Mcguire – Lead Developer, Keep It Simple Limited. For services to Vulnerable People during Covid-19
- Dr Julie Ruth Mcilwaine – For services to Healthcare in Cairngorms during Covid-19.
- Theresa Elizabeth Mcivor – Volunteer, Volunteering Matters. For services to the community during Covid-19
- Scott Mcpartlin – Network Engineer, BT Openreach. For services to Telecommunications during Covid-19
- Elizabeth Mcwhirter – Police Officer, British Transport Police. For services to Policing and Public Safety particularly during Covid-19
- Sandra Eustene Meadows – Chief Executive, VOSCUR. For services to the community of Bristol during Covid-19
- Lavina Mehta – For services to Health and Fitness during Covid-19
- Andrew Peter Miller – Team Member, TalkTalk Business Team. For services to Critical National Infrastructure during the Covid-19 response.
- Carole Milner – Instigator and Volunteer Convenor, Heritage & Crafts Funders Network. For services to Heritage and Crafts during Covid-19.
- Sarah-Jane Mintey – Founder and Chief Executive Officer, Developing Experts. For services to Technology and Education during Covid-19.
- Dr Catherine Tracey Moore – Consultant Clinical Scientist, Public Health Wales. For services to Public Health during Covid-19
- Professor Hywel Morgan – Professor of Bioelectronics, University of Southampton. For services to Biomedical Engineering particularly during Covid-19
- Andrew David Morris – Group Leader, Manufacturing Metrology, National Physical Laboratory. For services to the Manufacture and Supply of Personal Protection Equipment during the Covid-19 response.
- Eamon Mullaney – Professional Manager, Pharmacy Services. For services to the Pharmaceutical Sector particularly during Covid-19
- Leon Mundell – For services to the community in Greater Manchester during the Covid-19 response
- Michele Elizabeth Patricia Nel – For services to the community and frontline workers in Wigan during Covid-19
- Grace Elaine Nisbet – Anti-Poverty Manager, West Lothian Council. For services to the community in West Lothian particularly during Covid-19
- David O'Neill – Deputy Assistant Commissioner, Operational Policy, London Fire Brigade. For services to the Covid-19 response.
- Adekunle Olulode – Director, Voice4Change England. For services to the BAME community during Covid-19
- Mohamed Omer – For services to the British Muslim community during Covid-19
- Deborah Jane Pargeter – Headteacher, Tithe Farm Primary. For services to Education particularly during Covid-19
- Sandra Connie Payne – Director of Nursing and Care Homes, Brunelcare Bristol. For services to Social Care particularly during Covid-19
- Neil James Pearce – Head of Estates, Aneurin Bevan University Health Board. For services to the Covid-19 response
- Dr Jonathan James Hadow Pearce – Associate Director, Medical Research Council. For services to Covid-19 research.
- Zane Powles – Assistant Head, Western Primary School. For services to Education particularly during Covid-19
- Leahman Filmore Pratt – Christian Chaplain, Her Majesty's Prison Exeter. For services to Her Majesty's Prison and Probation Service during Covid-19.
- Gavin Gilbert Price – For services to the community in Aberfeldy during Covid-19
- Reza Rahnama – Director, Core Voice Services, BT. For services to Telecommunications during the Covid-19 response
- Marcus Rashford – Footballer, England and Manchester United. For services to Vulnerable Children in the UK during Covid-19
- Cordell John Francis Ray – Chief Executive Officer, Caring for Communities and People. For services to Charity particularly during Covid-19
- James Barry Rees – For services to the community in Ceredigion during Covid-19
- Dr Robin Anthony Ridley-Howe – Lead Medical Microbiologist, Public Health Wales. For services to Public Health in Wales particularly during Covid-19
- Heather Ann Russell – For services to Healthcare in Northern Ireland during Covid-19
- Claire Lesley Salisbury – For services to the NHS in Wales during Covid-19
- Dr Gurjinder Singh Sandhu – Consultant, Infectious Diseases, London North West University NHS Trust. For services to the NHS during Covid-19
- Jonathan Seaton DL – Founder and Chief Executive Officer, Twinkl. For services to Technology and Education during Covid-19.
- Chandni Sejpal Shah – For services to the community in North West London during Covid-19
- Richard Paul Sharp – Functional Delivery Lead, Capgemini. For services to Vulnerable People during the Covid-19 response
- Sarah Margaret Shaw – Director, Firstsite Colchester. For services to the Arts
- Jillian Margaret Shaw – Head Teacher, New York Primary School, Tyne and Wear. For services to Education particularly during Covid-19
- Samantha Louise Siddall – For services to the community in Edlington, South Yorkshire during Covid-19
- Dr Carter Singh – General Practitioner. For services to Healthcare in Nottinghamshire particularly during Covid-19
- Rajinder Singh Harzall – For services to Health and Fitness during Covid-19
- Stephen Douglas Singleton – Chief Executive, Suffolk Community Foundation. For services to the community in Suffolk during Covid-19
- Gareth James Smith – Department Lead, Severndale Specialist Academy. For services to Children and Young People during Covid-19
- Karen Smith – Emergency Authority and Government Relationship Manager, BT. For services to the Telecommunications Industry during Covid-19.
- Elizabeth Jane Stileman – For services to Incident Response and charitable service during Covid-19
- Olivia Antonia Strong – Founder, RunForHeroes. For services to Fundraising during Covid-19
- Margaret Sutherland – Chief Officer, South Denbighshire Community Partnership. For services to the community of Corwen during Covid-19.
- Vinod Bhagwandas Tailor – For services to the community in Bedfordshire during Covid-19
- Ian John Tandy – Managing Director, Global Trade & Receivables Finance UK, HSBC UK. For services to the Financial Services sector during Covid-19
- Juliana Mary Taylor – Nurse Consultant in Urology service, Salford Royal NHS Foundation Trust. For services to the NHS during Covid-19
- Paul Taylor – Operations Response Manager, RE:ACT Disaster Response. For services to Humanitarian Support during Covid-19
- Ella Terblanche – Principal Dietitian for Critical Care, St George's NHS Foundation Trust, London. For services to Dietetics particularly during Covid-19
- Robert George Thomas – Chief Executive, Vennture. For services to the community in Herefordshire during Covid-19
- Clare Thomas – Home Manager, Ilford Park Polish Home. For services to residential Social Care for Veterans during Covid-19.
- Richard Thomson – Train Manager, Transport for London. For services to Transport during Covid-19
- Siobhan Toland – For services to Local Government and Environmental Health during Covid-19
- Gemma Towers – Mobile Product Specialist, BT. For services to telecommunications during Covid-19
- Ashraf Uddin – For services to the St John Ambulance during the Covid-19 response
- Professor Matthew Robertson Walters – Head, School of Medicine, Dentistry and Nursing, University of Glasgow. For services to the NHS during Covid-19
- Elizabeth Ann Waters – Consultant Nurse, Aneurin Bevan University Health Board. For services to the NHS in Wales
- Michael Watson – Driver, United Parcel Service. For services to the community in Cardiff during Covid-19
- Joe Wicks – For services to Fitness and charity in the UK and Abroad particularly during Covid-19
- David Mark Williams – Railway Worker, Network Rail. For services to the Covid-19 response.
- Stephen Williams – Port Keyworker, Portico Shipping. For services to Shipping during Covid-19.
- Jill Williamina Young – For services to the NHS in Scotland during Covid-19.

- Kieron Robert Nnamdi Achara – Chair, Glasgow Rocks Community Foundation. For services to Community Sport in Scotland
- Sandra May Adair – For services to Volunteer Development, Management and Training in Northern Ireland
- Adebusuyi Adeyemi – Senior Policy Advisor, NHS England and NHS Improvement. For services to Healthcare Leadership
- Councillor Stephen Soterios Alambritis – Leader, Merton Borough Council . For services to Local Government in South London
- John Cameron Allen – Records Sensitivity Reviewer, Northern Ireland Office. For services to Safeguarding
- Bernice Suzanne Allport – Workplace Adjustment Team Leader, Civil Service Employee Policy, Cabinet Office. For services to Gender Equality
- Shanika Amarasekara – General Counsel, British Business Bank. For services to Business and the Economy
- June Angelides – For services to Women in Technology
- Robin Leslie Apps – For services to the community in the Borough of Tunbridge Wells, Kent
- Sophia Jane Archer JP – Chair, Norfolk Family Panel and Norfolk Magistrates Association. For services to the Administration of Justice
- Barry Armstrong – Senior Humanitarian Adviser, Department for International Development. For services to Victims of Humanitarian Disasters
- Darina Armstrong – Chief Executive, Progressive Building Society. For services to Economic Development in Northern Ireland
- William John Ainsley Arnold – Lately Member, Cheshire East Borough Council. For services to the community in Macclesfield, Cheshire
- Maria Arpa – For services to Mediation
- Albert Aspen – Trustee, Bolton Olympic Wrestling Club. For services to Wrestling
- Neeta Avnash Kaur Atkar JP – Non-Executive Director, British Business Bank. For services to Small Business Finance
- Ronald Anthony Leonard Atkins – For services to Horse Racing
- Andrew Oduro Ayim – For services to Diversity in the Technology Industry
- Anne-Marie Bagnall – Children Looked After Champion, Education Authority. For services to Education in Northern Ireland
- Rashida Baig – Head of Service, London Borough of Croydon. For services to Child and Family Social Work and Race Equality
- Martin Dawson Bailey – Author. For services to Art History and Journalism
- William Baldet – Midlands Co-ordinator, Prevent. For services to the community in Leicestershire
- Deborah Irene Barnett – Co-ordinator, Milk Bank Scotland. For services to Milk Bank Scotland and Infant Feeding
- Joel Baseley – Founder, The Roast Beef Club. For services to charity
- Ian David Beattie – Chairman, Scottish Athletics. For services to Athletics
- Richard Eric Belling – Chair, Belling Charitable Settlement. For services to the Education of Young People
- Julie Marie Bennett – Children's Rights and Participation Manager, Liverpool City Council. For services to Looked After Children in Liverpool
- Nelly Ben-Or Clynes – Speaker and Author, Northwood Holocaust Memorial Day Education. For services to Holocaust Education
- Christopher John Bentley – For services to Business and Culture
- Margaret Bibby – For services to the community in and around Chorley, Lancashire
- Rev. Canon Timothy Mark Frowde Biles – For services to the Church
- Denise Gaye Blake-Roberts – Director and Curator, Wedgwood Museum Trust. For services to Heritage
- Yadvinder Bolina – Lately Area Communications Manager, Crown Prosecution Service, West Midlands. For services to Law and Order
- Professor Laura Bowater – Professor of Microbiology Education, University of East Anglia. For services to Research and Education in Anti-Microbial Resistance
- David Brian Roden Bowden – For services to Cricket and the community in Sussex
- Laura Jane Brodie – Lately Headteacher, Allens Croft Nursery School, Birmingham. For services to Early Education and Children with Special Educational Needs
- Professor Steven John Broomhead – For services to Public Libraries
- Kenneth Frederick Charles Bruce – For services to charity and the community in Larne, County Antrim
- Georgina Florence Bryan – Election Agent, Preseli Pembrokeshire, Conservative Party. For political and public service
- Charles Ian Bryden – Chair, Wooden Spoon Scotland Region. For services to charity and Rugby
- Elaine Buckland – For services to Music and charity
- John Bullough Of Culcreuch – Chairman, Scotland's Charity Air Ambulance. For services to Emergency Healthcare in Scotland and to the community in Perth
- Matt Burghan – Team Leader, Ministry of Defence. For services to Defence
- Valerie Burrell-Walker – Fair Access Manager, Croydon Council. For services to Education
- Margaret Louise Cameron – For services to the Samaritans and Suicide Prevention
- Alistair George Cameron – For services to the community in Amersham, Buckinghamshire
- Thea Elizabeth Campbell – Disability Employment Adviser, Department for Work and Pensions. For services to Customers with Physical and Mental Health Conditions in Essex
- Natalie Denise Campbell – For services to Social Entrepreneurship and Business
- Marina Cantacuzino – Founder, The Forgiveness Project. For services to Victims of Trauma and Abuse
- Tracey Nichola Carter – Chief Nurse, West Hertfordshire Hospitals NHS Trust. For services to Nursing in the NHS
- Daryn Carter – Director and Programmer, Bristol Pride. For services to the LGBTQ+ community in Bristol
- Robert Cater – For services to Education and Science Engagement
- Emma Jane Elizabeth Chapman – Co-ordinator, In-Deep Community Task Force. For services to Preventing Isolation Among Older People and Children with Special Needs and their Families
- Yolanda Christina Charles – Bassist. For services to Music
- Geoffrey Thomas Cherry – Principal, Pond Park Primary School, Lisburn. For services to Education
- Shaun Edward Childs – Member, Barking and Dagenham Borough Council. For services to Vulnerable Families in East London
- Islamuddin Chowdhary – Barrister. For services to the Legal Profession in London
- Pamela Mary Chugg – For services to Women's Golf
- Stephen Barry Clare – Director, Holy Well Glass. For services to Stained Glass Conservation
- Dr Rory John Clarkson – Aerospace Engineer, Rolls-Royce. For services to International Trade and Aerospace Engineering
- Gail Hyacinth Claxton-Parmel – For services to Dance and Art in Birmingham
- Anthony Austin Cleary – Managing Director, Lanchester Wines. For services to International Trade and Exports
- Kathleen Shirley Clegg – Lately Chair, Official Prison Visitor Scheme, HM Prison Full Sutton. For services to Prisoners
- Madeleine Julie Margret Clements – Special Inspector, South Wales Police. For services to Policing
- Dr Jane Lesley Clements – For services to Inter Faith and Community Cohesion
- Geoffrey Andrew Clifton – For services to the community in Chester, Cheshire
- David Alexander Cameron Cochrane – For services to Tourism in Scotland
- Khadija Buke Coll – For services to Diversity and Equality in Scotland
- Philip John Collins – Lately Director, Corporate Finance and Performance, House of Commons. For parliamentary and voluntary service
- Janet Corcoran – For services to People with Autism
- Francis Edward Costello – Lately Chair, Wigan and Leigh College. For services to Education
- Glenys Irene Cour – For services to the Visual Arts in Wales
- Jeremy Mark Cousins – Head, Coal Liabilities Unit and Director's Office, Department for Business, Energy and Industrial Strategy. For services to the Coal Industry
- Cressida Cowell – For services to Children's Literature
- Kimberly Cram – Project Director, Macquarie Group. For services to Sustainable Energy Solutions
- Alison Cresswell – Lately Head of Participation and Education Services, Stockport Borough Council. For services to Education, Training and Apprenticeships
- Linda Crichton – For services to the Waste and Recycling Sector
- Major Randal Sinclair Cross – For services to the community in Ryde and the Isle of Wight
- Julia Margaret Cross – For services to Taekwon-Do
- James Andrew Stewart Curran – Principal, Harberton Special School, Belfast. For services to Education and Children with Special Educational Needs
- Joanne Jane Curry – For charitable service in North East England
- Arthur Richard Edward Curtis – Founder, TILE, Experience UK, ITEC and ETSA. For services to International Trade and Exports
- David William Curtis-Brignell – Deputy Chief Executive, Go to Places. For services to Tourism
- Stephen Daley – Captain, England Partially-Sighted Football Team. For services to Para Football
- Carl John Daniels – Deputy Senior Responsible Officer, Joint Emergency Services Interoperability Programme. For services to Incident Response
- Dr Bijna Kotak Dasani – Executive Director, Morgan Stanley. For voluntary services to Diversity and Inclusion in Finance
- Linda Marie Davies – For services to Education and the NHS in North London
- Clair Ann Davies – Principal, Appletree Treatment Centre. For services to Apprenticeships and Traumatised Children
- Councillor David Tudor Davies – Chair, South Wales Fire and Rescue Authority. For services to the Fire and Rescue Service in Wales
- The Venerable Rachel Hannah Eileen Davies – Founder, Tir Dewi. For services to Farming in West Wales
- Ellen Kerry Davis – For services to Holocaust Education
- Jill Elizabeth Dawson – Safety Officer, Chelsea Football Club. For services to Safety at Sporting Events
- Bernard Dawson – Member, Hyndburn District Council. For public service
- Susan Day – For services to Gender Equality in Sport
- Letitia Ann Dean DL – Founder, Bentimo PR. For services to Business and the community in Lancashire
- Paul Devlin – Occupational Therapy Service Lead, South Eastern Health and Social Care Trust. For services to the Occupational Therapy Profession and Healthcare
- Graham John Dickie – Artistic Director, Musical Theatre Course, Dance School of Scotland and Artistic Director, Young Scottish Musical Theatre Performer of the Year. For services to Musical Theatre and Education
- Elizabeth Dixon – Restorative Practice Manager, London Community Rehabilitation Company. For services to Justice
- Marcia Theresa Dixon – For services to Inter Faith Relations
- Ian Phillip Dolben – Fisheries Adviser, Environment Agency. For services to the Environment
- Erskine Decourtney Douglas – Accredited Counter Fraud Specialist and Head of Accounts Payable, Department of Health and Social Care. For services to Finance
- Michael David Drewery – Head, Debt Management Campaigns and Remissions, HM Revenue and Customs. For services to Debt Management Tax Collection in Peterborough
- Fiona Ann May Drouet – Founder, #emilytest. For services to Tackling Gender Based Violence
- Roger Dunton – Member, Harborough District Council. For services to the community in Market Harborough, Leicestershire
- Alison Edgar – Managing Director, Sales Coaching Solutions. For services to Entrepreneurship and Small Business
- Rioch Edwards-Brown – Founder, So You Wanna Be in TV? For services to the Television, Technology and Creative Sectors
- Selvarani Elahi – Deputy Government Chemist. For services to Food Measurement Science
- Graham Clive Elton – Senior Partner, Bain & Co. For services to the Economy
- Matthew Robert Hatton Evans – Leader, Conservative Group, Newport City Council. For political and public service
- Professor Christopher David Evans – Professor, Centre for Ecology and Hydrology, Bangor University, Wales. For services to Ecosystem Science
- Reanne Evans – For services to Women's Snooker
- Shirley Ann Faichen – Manager, Alverbridge Nursery, Gosport. For services to Education
- Ellen Marie Falkner – For services to Lawn Bowls
- Aurangzeb Farooq – Mentor, North West Regional Leadership Group, Mosaic. For services to Young People in Manchester
- Dr Derek Farrell – For services to Psychology
- Susan Anne Fawcus – Regional Resettlement Co-ordinator, South East Strategic Partnership for Migration. For services to Refugees
- Nigel Fenn – Senior HR Manager, Pennon Group Plc. For services to Apprenticeships and Technical Education in South West England
- Adrian Fisher – Founder and Maze Creator, Adrian Fisher Design. For services to International Trade and the Creative Industry
- Dr Ian Graham Fotheringham – Managing Director, Ingenza. For services to Industrial Biotechnology
- Professor Malcolm Leslie Garrett – Graphic Designer, Images&Co. For services to Design
- Brian Gault – For services to Thalidomide Survivors in Brazil and Children with Disabilities throughout the World
- Kadija George (Sesay) – Literary Activist, Editor and Publisher. For services to Publishing
- Joel Gibbard – Chief Executive Officer and Co-Founder, Open Bionics. For services to International Trade and Engineering Technology
- Karen Moriel Cecile Gibson – Choir Conductor. For services to Music
- Manjit Kaur Gill – Founder, Binti. For services to the Provision of Menstrual Products to Women in Developing Countries, the UK and the US
- Fiona Gwynedd Giraud – Director, Midwifery and Women's Services, Betsi Cadwaladr University Health Board. For services to Midwifery and Women's Services in Wales
- Suzanne Gooch – HR Director, Home Office. For public service and for services to Cancer Sufferers
- Pushkala Gopal – Dance Teacher. For services to South Asian Dance
- James Gordon – For services to the community in Alford, Aberdeenshire
- Angela Mary Gorman – Founder, Life for African Mothers. For charitable services to Expectant Mothers in Africa
- Darren Gough – For services to Cricket and charity
- Caroline Vanessa Grant – For services to Music, Media and charity
- Councillor Andrew Gravells – Member, Gloucestershire County Council and Gloucester City Council. For political and public service
- Debra Jane Gray – Principal, Grimsby Institute of Further and Higher Education. For services to Education
- Emily Jocelyn Gray – Lately Deputy Head, Girls' Education Team, Department For International Development. For services to Tackling Sexual Harassment Issues
- Wilton Owen Grey – Officer, Metropolitan Police Service. For services to Policing
- Jayne Edith Griffiths – Community Champion, Tesco Stores Ltd. For services to Business and the community in Llandrindod Wells, Powys
- Andrew Gordon Gunn – Lately Principal Economic Geologist, British Geological Survey. For services to Environmental Research
- Dilip Kumar Gurung – For services to the Nepalese community in the UK and Abroad
- Hilda Margaret Gwilliams – Chief Nurse, Alder Hey Children's NHS Foundation Trust. For services to Nursing in the NHS
- Lurel Roy Hackett – For services to the community in Bristol
- Karen Eastham Hadfield – Governance and Assurance Manager, Change Portfolio Management Office, Department for Work and Pensions. For public services and to the community in Wishaw, Lanarkshire
- Michael David Andrew Hall – Owner, Kestrel Foods. For services to Economic Development in Northern Ireland
- Richard Brian Hamer – Human Resources Director, Education and Skills, BAE Systems. For services to Social Mobility and Young People in the Defence Industry
- Dr Edward Joseph Hammond – Consultant Anaesthetist, Royal Devon and Exeter NHS Foundation Trust. For services to Medical Education
- Diana Lesley Hampson – For services to Higher Education and the community in Greater Manchester
- Jacqueline Monica Harland – Speech and Language Therapist, ARC Pathway. For services to Children with Special Educational Needs
- Paul David Harries – For services to Engineering and Employment in West Wales
- Linda Harvey – Headteacher, Beaumont Primary School. For services to Education
- Sarah Louise Haslam – Chief Engineer, Ford Motor Company Ltd. For services to Engineering and the Promotion of STEM Careers for Women
- Marianna Hay – Founder and Artistic Director, Orchestras For All. For services to Music Education
- Maxie Alphonso Hayles – Human Rights Campaigner. For services to the community in Birmingham
- Mervyn John Hempton – For services to the Economy in Northern Ireland
- Thomas William Higginson – Lately Chairman and President, British Association for Cricketers with Disabilities. For services to Disability Cricket
- Rita Hindocha-Morjaria – Executive Principal and Director of Secondary Education, Mead Educational Trust. For services to Education
- Alexander Simpson Hogg – Chair, Scottish Gamekeepers Association. For services to Gamekeeping in Scotland
- Kobna Holdbrook-Smith – Actor. For services to Drama
- Dr Paula Jane Holt – Pro Vice-Chancellor Dean, University of Derby. For services to Education
- Philip Edward Horwood – Security Projects Manager, Scottish Parliament. For parliamentary service
- Dr Rebecca Hoskins – Nurse Consultant, University Hospitals Bristol NHS Foundation Trust. For services to Emergency Nursing Care
- Martin Brian Howlett – For services to Cyber Security Skills and Young People
- Ching-He Huang – For services to the Culinary Arts
- Samantha Hunt – Volunteer, Survivors Fund, Holocaust Educational Trust, Remembering Srebrenica. For services to Holocaust and Genocide Education
- Julia Ann Hunt – Lately Director of Nursing, James Paget University Hospitals NHS Foundation Trust. For services to Nursing
- Isobel Hunter – Chief Executive, Libraries Connected. For services to Public Libraries
- Jason Iley – For services to the Music and charity
- Ann Ingram – Administrator, Ladybird Developmental Playgroup. For services to Children with Disabilities in Moray
- Councillor Mohammed Iqbal – Member, Pendle Borough Council and Lancashire County Council. For services to Local Government in East Lancashire
- George Irvine – For services to Education and the community in Carrickfergus
- Sarah Lucy Jackson – Headteacher and Founder, Parayhouse School, Hammersmith. For services to Children and Young People with Special Educational Needs
- Haydn Lloyd Richard Jakes – Team Member, WorldSkills UK. For services to the WorldSkills Competition
- Lucy Amanda Jewson – Founder, Frugi. For services to Ethical Clothing Design
- Lisa Marie Johnson – For services to Survivors of Domestic Abuse
- Eluned Griffith Jones – Lately Director, Student Employability, University of Birmingham. For services to Career Development in Higher Education
- Susan Jill Jones – Head of Nursery, Fort Hill Integrated Primary, Lisburn. For services to Pre-School and Primary Integrated Education
- Colin Raymond Jones – National Coach, Welsh Amateur Boxing Association. For services to Boxing in Wales
- Jessica Leigh Jones – For services to Women in Engineering in Wales
- Huw Glyn Jones – For services to the Economy in Wales
- Dr Hilary Robert Jones – For services to Broadcasting, Public Health Information and Charity
- Mordechai (Chuni) Kahan – For services to Holocaust Education and the community in Barnet
- Allison Kemp – Managing Director, A.I.M Commercial Services Ltd. For services to Transport and Logistics
- Arinze Mokwe Kene – For services to Drama and Screenwriting
- Julie Dawn Kent – Founder, The Emily Kent Charitable Trust. For services to charity
- Farrah Khan – Head, Service Delivery, Children's Services, Leeds City Council. For services to Children and Families
- Nasir Ahmed Khan – Co-Founder, Muslims in Rail. For services to Muslim Representation in the Rail Industry
- Rosemary Jane Kimber – For services to the community in Potton, Bedfordshire
- Lady Zahava Kohn – For services to Holocaust Education
- Parminder Kaur Kondral – Co-ordinator, UK Sikh Healthcare Chaplaincy. For services to the Sikh community
- Martin Paul Arthur Langsdale – Chair, Derby Cathedral Quarter Business Improvement District. For services to the Economy in Derby
- Professor Margaret Jayne Lawrence – Head, Division of Pharmacy and Optometry, University of Manchester. For services to Pharmaceutical Research
- Yvonne Aba Paintowa Lawson – Chief Executive Officer, Godwin Lawson Foundation. For services to Tackling Knife and Gang Crime in London
- Lisa Anne Lawson – Founder and Chief Executive, Dear Green Coffee. For services to Business and the community in Glasgow
- Stephen David Layton – Conductor. For services to Classical Music
- Jeffrey Harvey Leader – Director, Pikuach. For services to Education
- Jane Elizabeth Leech – Member, Independent Monitoring Boards. For services to Monitoring the Immigration Detention Estate
- Simon John Leftley – Senior Responsible Officer, Essex Transforming Care Partnership. For services to People with Learning Disabilities in Southend and Essex
- Janice Lever – Creator and Director, Jigsaw PSHE. For services to Education
- Professor David Michael Lewis – Chair, Riverston School, Royal Borough of Greenwich. For services to Education
- Thomas Nelson William Lindsay – Senior Coach, Ards Swimming Club. For services to Swimming in Northern Ireland
- Peter Moffit Crawford Little – For services to the community in Enniskillen, County Fermanagh
- Mark Jeremy Carlo Little – Chairman, Police Learning Advisory Council. For services to Policing in Northern Ireland
- Sophie Elizabeth Livingstone – Chair, Little Village. For services to charity
- Carole Lovstrom – For voluntary service to Social Mobility in Government
- Helen Patricia Luddington – Director, West Bridgford Out of School Clubs and The Playroom Nursery. For services to Children and Families in Nottingham
- Geraldine Lundy – For services to Aviation Accessibility
- Donna Lynas – Director, Wysing Arts Centre. For services to the Arts
- John Charles Lyons – Media Officer, Operation Cabrit. For public service
- Isobel Shand Macdonald – For services to charity and the community in Inverness
- Alastair Hulbert Machray – Editor, Liverpool Echo. For services to Local Media
- Donald Cameron Macleod – Chairman, Fundraising Committee, Nordoff Robbins Scotland. For services to Music and charity
- Jane Macquitty – For services to Wine Journalism
- Dr Ibrar Mohammed Majid – For services to Healthcare and Community Development in Manchester
- Susan Claire Marshall – Lately Chief Nurse, Sussex Community NHS Foundation Trust and Queen's Nurse. For services to Nursing
- Elizabeth Ann Marshall – For services to the community in the London Borough of Tower Hamlets
- Alan Marwood – Special Constable, Nottinghamshire Police. For services to Policing
- John Barry Mason – For services to Music
- Professor Nigel Joseph Mathers – Emeritus Professor of Primary Medical Care, University of Sheffield and lately General Practitioner, Bluebell Medical Centre. For services to General Practice
- Petter Matthews – Executive Director, Engineers Against Poverty. For services to Engineering and International Development
- Paul William Mayhew-Archer – For services to People with Parkinson's Disease and Cancer
- Fiona Mcavoy – Headteacher, Newton Primary School. For services to Education in South Ayrshire
- Dr Carmel Patricia Maria Mccalmont – Lately Director of Midwifery Birmingham and Solihull United Maternity and Newborn Partnership. For services to Midwifery
- Alan Roy Mccarthy – Chair, Western Sussex Hospitals NHS Foundation Trust and Brighton and Sussex University Hospitals NHS Trust. For services to the NHS
- Una Mccrann – Feeding Disorder Practitioner, Great Ormond Street Hospital for Children NHS Foundation Trust. For services to Nursing
- Donal Mccrisken – For services to Music, Education and Cross Community Relations in Northern Ireland
- Theresa Mcelhone – UNICEF Infant Feeding Adviser. For services to Healthcare and Families
- Laura Susan Mcgillivray – Chief Executive, Norwich City Council. For services to Local Government
- Shirley Mcgreal – For services to Tackling Youth Violence, Knife Crime and Poverty
- John Mchale – Member, Doncaster Metropolitan Borough Council. For public service
- Dr Andrew Keith Mcindoe – Consultant Anaesthetist, University Hospitals Bristol NHS Foundation Trust. For services to Medical Simulation, Electronic Learning and Assessment
- Colette Mckeaveney DL – Director, Age Concern Luton. For services to Older People in Luton
- Gillian Mckee – Deputy Managing Director (Northern Ireland), Business in the Community. For services to the community in Northern Ireland
- Errol Mckellar – Volunteer and Campaigner. For services to Prostate Cancer Awareness
- Mark Thomas Mckenna – Co- Founder and Director, Down to Earth Project and Down to Earth Construction. For services to Young People and the Environment
- Vincent Edward Mcnally – For services to the community in Hereford
- Sharon Elaine Medhurst – For services to the community in Edenbridge, Kent
- Simon Melluish – Chair of the Committee, Art for Youth London. For services to Young People and charity
- Susan Meredith – Team Leader, Ministry of Defence. For services to Defence
- Sajjad Miah – For services to the community in the London Borough of Tower Hamlets
- Dr Carolyn Margaret Middleton – Associate Director of Nursing, Aneurin Bevan University Health Board. For services to Nursing
- Isobel Mieras – For services to Music in Scotland and to the Revival of the Clarsach
- Colin Millar – Lately Principal, Killard House Special School, Donaghadee. For services to Education
- Lee Philip Miller – Deputy Chief Executive Officer, Thinking Schools Academy Trust. For services to Education
- Elizabeth Anne Mills DL – For services to the community in Rutland
- Dylan Kwabena Mills, Rapper. For services to Music
- Alison Anne Milne – For services to Rural Scotland and Agriculture
- Asgher Mohammed – Managing Director, Abbey Chemist, Paisley and Founder, Scottish Sadaqah Trust, Glasgow. For services to Pharmacy and charity
- John Trevor Monteith – For services to Adults with Learning Disabilities in Carrickfergus, County Antrim
- Jayne Beverley Moore – Lately Deputy Headteacher, Ridgeway School, Farnham. For services to Education and Young People with Special Educational Needs
- Debra Moore – Independent Consultant Nurse. For services to Learning Disability Nursing
- Chris Moore – Fashion Photographer. For services to Fashion and Business
- Erdem Moralioglu – Fashion Designer. For services to Fashion
- Mary Moreland – Chair, War Widows Association. For services to War Widows
- Fiona Edwina Morgan – Disability Employment Adviser, Department for Work and Pensions. For services to Mental Health
- Simon Benedict Morris – Lately Chief Executive, Jewish Care. For services to the Jewish Community in London and South East England
- Dr Cecily Peregrine Borgatti Morrison – Principal Researcher, Microsoft Research. For services to Inclusive Design
- Eve Muirhead – For services to Curling
- Morag Munro – Lately Co-ordinator, Crossroads Care. For services to the community on the Isle of Harris, Western Isles
- Georgina Ruth Nayler – Deputy Chair, Pitzhanger Manor and Gallery Trust. For services to Heritage and Culture
- James Bernard Neilly – For services to Sports Broadcasting and charity in Northern Ireland
- Jeremy Nelson – For services to Radio
- Doris Bell Neville-Davies – Trustee, Parentkind. For services to Education
- Professor Mark Timothy O'Shea – Professor of Herpetology, University of Wolverhampton. For services to Higher Education, Zoology, Reptile Conservation and Snakebite Research
- Judith Rosina Oliver JP – Member, Youth Referral Panel, Coventry Youth Offending Team. For services to Justice in Coventry
- Alison Mary Oliver – Chief Executive, Youth Sport Trust. For services to Sport
- Mark Paul Ormrod – Marketing and Communications Officer, Royal Marines Association and Charity. For services to the Royal Marines and Veterans
- Reverend Prebendary Jonathan Lloyd Osborne – Senior Chaplain, Metropolitan Police Service. For services to Police Officers and Staff
- Carol Jane Oundjian – For services to Bereaved People
- Dr Joseph Palmer – General Practitioner, South Eastern Health and Social Care Trust. For services to Prison Healthcare in Northern Ireland
- Kenneth (Keith) Lloyd Palmer – Founding Director, The Comedy School and The Comedy School Charitable Trust. For services to Entertainment and charity
- George Gottleib Parker – For services to the Business and community in Llanelli
- Vasant Patel – Senior Policy Officer, Department for Education. For services to Adopted Children and their Families
- Hemantkumar Kiritbhai Patel – Lately Trustee and Interim Chair, Royal Armouries. For services to Museums and Heritage
- Samantha Joanne Payne – Chief Operating Officer and Co-Founder, Open Bionics. For services to International Trade and Engineering Technology
- Brian Wyn Paynter – Project Director, Network Rail. For services to Railway Safety and to charity
- Eric Harries Peake – For services to Art and Ornithological Conservation
- Sonia Pearcey – Freedom to Speak Up Guardian, Gloucestershire Health and Care NHS Foundation Trust. For services to the NHS
- Sally Selorm Juliet Penni – Barrister at Law, Kenworthy Chambers. For services to Diversity in the Workplace, Social Mobility and Law
- Paul Andrew Philbert – For services to Music
- Carrie Anne Philbin – Director of Educator Support, Raspberry Pi Foundation. For services to Education
- Martin Edward Phillips – For services to the community in West Sussex
- Julie Phillips – Lately Head Coach, St Tydfils Gymnastics Club, Merthyr Tydfil. For services to Gymnastics in Wales
- Jennifer Elizabeth Pike – For services to Classical Music
- Jennifer Claire Pitt – Admin Clerk, SF Support Group. For public service
- Patricia Mary Plumbridge – For services to the community in Newlyn, Cornwall
- Dr Colin John Podmore – For services to the Church of England
- Helen Jean Pollard – Consultant, Institute of Physics. For services to Physics Education
- Irene Pollard – For services to People with Disabilities and their Families in Inverclyde
- James Oliver Portus – For services to the Fishing Industry
- Gloria Joycelin Pottinger – Foster Carer. For services to Children and Young People in the London Borough of Southwark
- Aline Teresa Poulter – Operations Manager, Surrey Heath Borough Council. For services to Vulnerable and Older People
- Stuart Powell – Team Leader, Ministry of Defence. For services to Defence
- Derek Pratt – Crawley Neighbourhood Watch. For services to Crime Prevention and Public Safety
- Councillor Susan Myfanwy Prochak – Member, Rother District Council. For services to the community in Robertsbridge Parish, East Sussex
- Graham Race – For services to Overcoming Disability Barriers in Aviation
- Tamara Rajah – For services to Technology and Entrepreneurship
- George Michael Rawlinson – Chair, National Water Safety Forum and lately Operations and Safety Director, Royal National Lifeboat Institution. For services to Maritime Safety
- Rosalind Read-Leah – Founder, Domestic Abuse Charter, Department for Transport. For services to Civil Servants experiencing Domestic Abuse
- Bethan Sian Reece – Mental Health Ally. For services to the Administration of Justice
- David Kenton Reed – Lately Chief Superintendent, Metropolitan Police Service. For services to Policing
- Madelaine Reid – For services to Girlguiding and the community in the London Borough of Sutton
- Edmund Reid – For services to Music
- Philip Christopher Richards – Lead People Partner, Tesco Stores Ltd. For services to the Economy and charity
- Margaret Elizabeth Robertson – Musical Director, Hjaltibonhoga, the Shetland Fiddlers of the Royal Edinburgh Military Tattoo. For services to Traditional Scottish Music
- Professor Helen Dawn Rodd – Professor and Consultant, Paediatric Dentistry, University of Sheffield, School of Clinical Dentistry. For services to Young People and NHS Leadership
- Therese Rogan – For services to Disadvantaged Young People in Northern Ireland
- Ann Rowlands – For services to the community in Derbyshire
- Josie Rudman – Chief Nurse, Royal Papworth Hospital NHS Foundation Trust. For services to Nursing, Patient Experience and Patient Safety
- Professor Emeritus Ian Gordon Russell – President, The North Atlantic Fiddle Convention and Director, Village Carols. For services to Music and Cultural Tradition
- Jon-Marcus Emil Ryder – For services to Diversity in the Media
- Dr Helen Louise Sanderson – Founder and Chief Executive, Wellbeing Teams. For services to Adult Social Care
- Baljeet Kaur Sandhu – Founder, Centre for Knowledge Equity. For services to Equality and Civil Society
- Diane Marie Sarkar – Chief Nursing Officer, Mid and South Essex NHS Foundation Trust. For services to Nursing in the NHS
- Leslie Saunders – EU Scrutiny Manager, Cabinet Office. For public service
- Jean Saunders – Senior Nurse, Asylum Seekers and Refugees, Swansea Bay University Health Board. For services to Nursing
- Janet Elizabeth Sawyer BEM – Founder, LittlePod. For services to International Trade, Sustainability and Exports
- James Scanlon – Chair, Leith Links Community Council. For services to the community in Leith, Edinburgh
- Alan Cedric Scott – Chair, Lincolnshire Scouts. For services to Scouting and the community in Stamford, Lincolnshire
- Kenneth Scott – Head of Inspectorate, Sports Grounds Safety Authority. For services to Safety at Sporting Events
- Pamela Scourfield – Chair of Governors, Bedwas High School, Caerphilly. For services to Education
- Elva Dean Sealy – For services to the community in the London Borough of Brent
- Jayantilal Shah – Founder, Positive Message Ltd. For services to promoting Anti-Racism in Southampton and Hampshire
- Qaisra Shahraz – Founder, Curator and Executive Director, Muslim Arts and Culture Festival. For services to Gender Equality and Cultural Learning
- Lynne Elizabeth Sheehy – Corporate Social Responsibility Manager, Legal and General. For services to the community in Cardiff
- Kate Elizabeth Sherman – Complex Trauma Physiotherapist, Defence Medical Rehabilitation Centre, Stanford Hall. For services to Military Casualties
- David Gray Sibbald – Founder, Sibbald Training Ltd. For services to Business and charity in West Lothian
- Mawlana Mohammed Tayyab Sidat – Founder, IMO Charity. For charitable services
- Julie Siddiqi – Founder, Sadaqa Day. For services to Promoting Inter Faith Understanding
- Sylvia Elizabeth Silver – For services to Older People through the National Activity Providers Association and to the Royal Air Force Air Cadets
- Katharine Francis Simpson – Vice Chair, Employer Engagement, North of England Reserve Forces and Cadets Association. For voluntary service to the Armed Forces
- John Stuart Simpson – Founder and President, On Course Foundation. For services to Armed Forces Veterans, providing Rehabilitation and Employment through Golf
- Gurpreet Singh – Non-Executive Director and lately Consultant Urologist, Southport and Ormskirk Hospital NHS Trust. For services to Healthcare, Equality and Fairness
- Angela Mary Singleton – Project Co-ordinator, Crewkerne Active Lifestyle Centre. For services to Community Health and Wellbeing
- William Slavin – Chair, The Whitehaven Foyer. For services to Homeless People, Education and the community in West Cumbria
- Valerie Elizabeth Smith – Head, Tariff Management and Duty Liability, HM Revenue and Customs. For services to Customs Policy and Operational Delivery
- Dr Craig Norman Smith – Technical Expert, Complex Weapons, MBDA UK Ltd. For services to Military Capability
- Charles William Smith – For services to Farming and Agriculture
- Margaret Anne Smith – For services to Lawn Bowlers with Disabilities
- William Smith – President, East Anglian Sailing Trust. For services to Sailors with Disabilities
- Sandra Cameron Smith – Foster Carer, Dundee City Council. For services to Children and to the community in Broughty Ferry, Dundee
- Carolyn Joy Smith – Road Safety and Business Performance Manager, Neath Port Talbot County Borough Council. For services to Road Safety
- Alan Gordon Snoddy – World Cup Finals Referee and Technical Instructor, FIFA and UEFA. For services to Association Football
- Margaret Ann Southall – Lately Headteacher, Corbett Primary School, Bobbington, Staffordshire. For services to Education
- Belinda Mary Southwell JP – Volunteer, HMP Erlestoke. For services to Offender Rehabilitation and the community in Wiltshire
- Karen Anna Spencer – For services to Further Education and Aviation
- Kiruba Sri Shanmuganathan – Executive Support, Department for Exiting the European Union. For public service
- Brian Stanislas – Product Manager, Civil Service Human Resources, Cabinet Office. For services to Flexible Working and Equality in the Workplace
- Polly Stenham – Playwright. For services to Theatre and Literature
- Helen Elizabeth Stephens – Chair, North West Area, Sea Cadets. For voluntary service to Young People
- Lili Stern-Pohlmann – For services to Holocaust Education, Awareness and Human Relations
- William Richardson Stewart – Senior Health Adviser, Department for International Development. For services to LGBT Rights and International Development
- Rae Diane Stollard – Member, Bournemouth, Christchurch and Poole Council. For services to the community in Bournemouth
- Rabbi Avrohom Sugarman – Director, Haskel School, Gateshead. For services to Education and Children with Special Educational Needs
- Karen Rochelle Sugarman – Executive Vice President, Shooting Star Children's Hospices. For services to Life-Limited Young People and their Families
- Sara Jane Sutcliffe – Chief Executive, Table Tennis England. For services to Table Tennis
- Johnathan Owen Aicard Thompson – For services to the community in Bognor Regis, West Sussex
- Reverend Dr John Isaac Thompson TD DL – For services to Her Majesty's Forces and the community in Cookstown, County Tyrone
- Jamie Thums – Chief Operating Officer, Lintott Control Systems. For services to Manufacturing in East Anglia
- Jacob Thundil – Founder, Cocofina. For services to International Trade and Exports
- Richard John Thurston – Researcher, Social Science. For public service
- Peter Townley – Trustee, Better Pathways. For services to People with Disabilities in the West Midlands
- Dr Karen Treisman – Clinical Psychologist and Director, Safe Hands Thinking Minds. For services to Children
- Sampson Alfred Kirkpatrick Trotter BEM – For services to Police Welfare
- Sheila Try – For services to the community in the West Midlands
- Bruce Kenneth Turner – Managing Director, PureMalt. For services to Business and the Economy in East Lothian
- Caroline Susan Jane Twemlow – For services to Riding for the Disabled Association in Northern Ireland
- Syed Afsar Uddin – Teacher of Bengali, Oaklands Secondary School. For services to Education and the community in the London Borough of Tower Hamlets
- Vivienne Upfold – Foster Carer, Barnardo's. For services to Children and Families in South East England
- Ruth Ann Van Dyke – For services to Childcare and Early Learning for Disadvantaged Children
- Ayse Funda Veli – Diary Manager, Leader of HM Opposition. For political service
- Michael William Hugh Vernon – Founder, Blue Horizon Record Label. For services to Music
- Professor Jane Elizabeth Viner – Lately Chief Nurse and Deputy Chief Executive, Torbay and South Devon NHS Foundation Trust. For services to Nursing
- Valerie May Walker – Lately Director of Nursing and Operations, Care for Veterans. For services to Healthcare for Veterans
- Michelle Antoinette Wallen – Singer. For services to Music, Entertainment and charity
- Patricia Mary Walsh – For services to the community in Skye and Lochalsh
- Julian Derek Webb – For public service
- Professor Janette Webb – Professor of Sociology of Organisations, University of Edinburgh. For services to Energy Transition in the UK
- Seonaid Clare Webb – Deputy Director, Secondary Legislation, Department for Environment, Food and Rural Affairs. For public service and for services to Cancer Sufferers
- Rebecca Showtica West – Team Member, WorldSkills UK. For services to the WorldSkills Competition
- Ian George Westgate – For services to People with Disabilities in Eastbourne, East Sussex
- Mark Culley Whelan – Lately Detective Sergeant, Lancashire Constabulary. For services to Policing in East Lancashire
- Truda White – Founder, Music in Secondary Schools Trust. For services to Education
- Densign White – Chair, Sporting Equals. For services to Diversity in Sport
- Colin Richard Wilkes – For services to Business in North East England
- Andrew Willard – Senior Officer HM Prison Channings Wood. For services to HM Prison and Probation Service
- Roy Williams – Jazz Trombonist. For services to Jazz
- Avis Alexandra Williams-Mckoy – Health Partner, Executive Board, Lambeth Safeguarding Children Board. For services to the Protection of Young People
- James Wilson – For services to Veterinary Practice and Animal Welfare on the Isle of Mull
- Catherine Elizabeth Winfield – Executive Chief Nurse, University Hospitals of Derby and Burton NHS Foundation Trust. For services to Nursing
- Daniel Kamin Winterfeldt QC (Hon) – For services to Capital Markets, Equality and Diversity in the Legal Profession
- Stephen Malcolm Spencer Winyard – Chair, Stobo Health Spa. For services to Business and the community in Peeblesshire
- Alfred Chi Bong Wong – Deputy Principal Accountant, Department of Finance, Northern Ireland Executive. For services to Racial Equality and to the Government in Northern Ireland
- Professor Simon Paul Wright – Principal Partner, Glencairn Dental Practice. For services to Patient Safety in Dentistry
- Denise Anne Yates – Charity Trustee and lately Chief Executive Officer, Potential Plus UK. For services to Children and Young People
- Martin William Yates – Training Manager, WorldSkills UK. For services to the WorldSkills Competition
- Dr Giles Yeo – Principal Research Associate, University of Cambridge. For services to Research and Communication and Engagement
- Elizabeth Anne Youens – For voluntary service to Swimming in Wendover, Buckinghamshire

Honorary

- Angela Marie Tanzillo-Swarts – Forensic DNA Specialist, Health Services Authority, Cayman Islands. For services to the COVID 19 Response in the Cayman Islands

=== British Empire Medal (BEM) ===
British Empire Medal ribbon

- Ibrar Akram – Service Delivery Manager, Transport for London. For service to Transport and the community in London during Covid-19
- Terence Allen – Porter, Interserve, University College London. For services to the NHS during Covid-19
- Reverend David Lee Anderson – Chaplain, East Lancashire NHS Hospital Trust. For Services to the NHS during Covid-19
- John Anderson QFSM – For services to the community in Fraserburgh during the Covid-19 response
- Hannah Mary Angland – Lead Nurse, Integrated Community Ageing Team, Islington. For services to Nursing during Covid-19
- Christopher William Armstrong – Driver, United Parcel Service. For services to the NHS and community during Covid-19
- Stephen George Edwin Baillie – For services to Education and the community in County Antrim during Covid-19
- Philip Raymond Baker – County Councillor, Saundersfoot. For Public Service during Covid-19.
- Julie Dawn Barry – For services to the community in Edenbridge, Kent during Covid-19
- Steven Barton – For services to the community in Tameside, Greater Manchester during Covid-19
- Dr Mahaboob Basha– External Relations and Engagement Manager, Energy Safety Research Institute, Swansea University. For services to the community in Sketty, Swansea during Covid-19
- Fiona Maria Belcham – For services to the community in Clitheroe during Covid-19
- Christopher Bell – Senior Member Services Officer, Capital Credit Union. For services to the Financial Sector during Covid-19
- Helen Bewley – Anatomical Pathology Technician and Mortuary Manager, Buckinghamshire Healthcare NHS Trust. For services to Pathology during Covid-19
- Paul Billam – Driver, Yorkshire Stagecoach. For services to Transport and the community during Covid-19
- Penelope Bond – Volunteer Reserve, London North East Railway. For services to the Covid-19 response
- Alex Osei Bonsu – Supermarket Assistant, Waitrose & Partners. For services to the community in Buckinghamshire during Covid-19
- Alice Bretland – Physiotherapist and Team Lead, Home Ventilation Team. For services to the NHS particularly during Covid-19
- William Phillips Cochran Brown – For services to the community in Largs during Covid-19
- Paul Christopher Alan Buckingham – For services to the NHS in Wales during Covid-19
- Kevin Burke – Project Manager, Govan Youth Information Project. For services to Children and Families during Covid-19
- Catherine Joy Burn – Director, Bassetlaw Community and Voluntary Service. For services to the community during Covid-19
- Georgina Margaret Calwell – Manager, Adult SLT Team, South Eastern Trust. For services to Speech and Language Therapy particularly during Covid-19
- Sonya Cary – Postmistress, Pontrilas Post Office. For services to the Post Office and the community during Covid-19
- Aileen Elizabeth Caughey – Prison Officer, Her Majesty's Prison, Magilligan. For services to Her Majesty's Prison and Probation Service during Covid-19.
- John Challenger – For services to Young People in the North West during Covid-19.
- Susan Chapman – Deputy Divisional Director of Estates and Facilities, East Lancashire Hospitals NHS Trust. For services to the NHS during the Covid-19 response
- Simon Charleton – Chief Executive Officer, St John's College. For services to Young People with Special Educational Needs during Covid-19.
- Michael Ignotius Chin-Chan – For services to Charity during Covid-19.
- Rita Chohan – For services to the NHS during Covid-19
- Bridget Joan Clark – For services to the community in Doncaster, South Yorkshire during Covid-19
- Karen Ann Clarke – E-Commerce Customer Trading Manager, Asda Ltd. For services to the Covid-19 response.
- Adam Clode – Caretake, Gladstone Primary School. For services to the community in Barry during Covid-19
- Anthony Lee Cocker – Plumber, Salford Royal NHS Foundation Trust. For services to the NHS during Covid-19
- Jade Michelle Cole – For services to the NHS and Critical Care Research during Covid-19
- Oliver Miles Coles – Founder, Hospitality for Heroes. For services to Hospitality and the NHS during Covid-19
- Julie Cook – Community Colleague, Asda Ltd. For services to the community during Covid-19
- Agnes Cook – For services to the community in Kinross during Covid-19
- Councillor Mark Lawrance Cooper – For services to the community in Newtonabbey during Covid-19
- Lloyd James Creaney – For services to Key Workers during Covid-19
- Ruth Helen Creaney – For services to Key Workers during Covid-19
- Lorna Creswell – For services to the community in Moray during Covid-19
- Deborah Crow – For services to the community in South Glamorgan during Covid-19
- Samantha Anna Marie Juanita D'Souza – Community Champion, Asda Ltd. For services to the community during Covid-19
- Arie Darbandi – Resident Experience Manager, Arbrook House, Bupa Care Services. For services to Social Care during Covid-19
- Neil Gordon Davies – Strategic Manager, Homeless service, Sefton Council. For services to the Homeless during Covid-19.
- Dr Hareen De Silva – For services to General Practice during Covid-19
- George William Adams Devine – For services to the community of Fen Ditton, Cambridgeshire during Covid-19
- Jayne Margaret Dingemans – Director of Patient Services, Garden House Hospice Care. For services to Palliative Care particularly during Covid-19
- Ahmud Raza Domah – General Manager, Hill House Care Home. For services to Social Care during Covid-19
- Aileen Donaldson – Local manager, TSB. For services to the Financial Services sector during Covid-19
- Gregory Steven Hayes Doughty – Transport Worker, Highways England. For services to Transport and to the Homeless during Covid-19.
- Hilary Margaret Dover – Service Director, Primary and Community Services, Swansea Bay Region. For services to the NHS during Covid-19
- Councillor Paul Samuel Dunlop – For services to the community in County Antrim during Covid-19
- Andrew James Dunsmore – Food Services Assistant, J Sainsbury's plc. For services to the community during Covid-19
- Damian Antony Edwards – For services to the community of Alkrington, Greater Manchester during Covid-19
- Karen Edwards – Local Authority Key Worker, Rushmoor Borough Council. For services to the community during Covid-19
- Ben England – Founder, Homechoir. For services to the community during Covid-19.
- Eno-Obong Esin – Ward Clerk, Adult Critical Care Services, Manchester University NHS Foundation Trust. For services to the NHS during Covid-19
- Haley Etheridge – Project Coordinator, Diverse FM. For services to Radio Broadcasting and Young People during Covid-19
- Ghulam Farid – For services to the community in Grangemouth during Covid-19
- Samantha Jane Gallagher – Nursing Home Manager and Registered Nurse, Brandon Park Nursing Home. For services to Social Care during Covid-19
- Paula Jane Gallent – Ward Sister, Cardiff and Vale University Health board. For services to the NHS during Covid-19
- Marlyn Gardner – For services to the community in Stirlingshire during Covid-19
- Dennis Brian Gargett – Operations Director, Marske Fabrication & Engineering Ltd. For services to the community during Covid-19
- Emma-Karin Gerdin-Miosga – Arts Facilitator, Wingham Court, BUPA. For services to Care Home residents during Covid-19
- Jack William Gibbins – Tactical Lead, St John Ambulance (Cymru). For services to the community during Covid-19.
- Bryson Phillip Gifford – Director of Continuous Improvement, Wellcross Grange Nursing Home. For services to Care Home residents during Covid-19
- Andrea Margaret Greenall – Health Care Assistant, Royal Bolton Hospital, Bolton NHS Foundation Trust. For services to the NHS during Covid-19
- Lynne Grieves – Nurse, Northlea Court Care Home. For services to Nursing during Covid-19
- Lisa Griffiths – Branch Manager, Barclays. For services to the Financial Services sector during Covid-19
- Margaret Patricia Gurney – Services Assistant, J Sainsbury's plc. For services to the community during Covid-19
- Sheena Hales – Programme Manager, NatWest Group. For services to the Financial Services sector and to the community during Covid-19
- Sophie Jane Hamilton – For services to the community in Peebles during Covid-19
- Ann Patricia Hannah – Rapid Response Laboratory and Cellular Pathology Operations Manager, Health Services Laboratory. For services to Healthcare during Covid-19
- Ann Harding – For services to the community in Settle, North Yorkshire during Covid-19
- Hazel Harper – Journey Developer, NatWest Group. For services to the Financial Services sector and the community during Covid-19
- Michael Steven Hart – For services to the community in Doncaster, South Yorkshire during Covid-19
- Andrew Wayne Hattersley – For services to the community in Harrogate, North Yorkshire during Covid-19
- Apple-Jane Isabella Hayward – For services to the community in Brentwood, Essex during Covid-19
- Molly Henriques-Dillon – Quality Nurse Team Leader, Black Country and West Birmingham Clinical Commissioning Groups. For services to Nursing during Covid-19
- Liam Robert Andrew Hewitt – Tenancy Support Worker, Pembrokeshire Care Society. For services to the community during Covid-19
- Mathew David Hill – For services to the St John Ambulance (Cymru) during the Covid-19 response
- Hugh Hill – For services to the Homeless in Scotland during Covid-19
- Robert William Hodgson – Senior Project Leader, Labman Automation Ltd. For services to the NHS during Covid-19
- Richard David Holmes – Volunteer Guide, The Mid Yorkshire Hospitals NHS Trust. For services to the NHS during Covid-19.
- Wayne Horlock – Station Officer, London Fire Brigade. For services to the Covid-19 response
- Jessica Lauren Horne – Clinical Lead, Respiratory Physiotherapy, Whittington Health NHS Trust. For services to the NHS during Covid-19
- Robert Johannes George Hunningher – For services to the community in Hoxton, Greater London during Covid-19
- Peta Jane Hustwayte – Teacher, Greater Horseshoe School. For services to Young People during Covid-19
- Emma Louise Jackson – For services to the community in Blackpool during Covid-19
- Henry Oscar James – For services to the NHS and the community during Covid-19
- Theivandiram Jeevathasan – For services to the community in Graffham, West Sussex during Covid-19
- Richard Jefferies – For services to the community in Mere, Wiltshire during Covid-19
- Christopher Vivian Jenkin – Chair, It Takes a City. For services to the Homeless in Cambridge during Covid-19.
- Clare Marie Johnstone – Head of Infection Prevention and Control, Central London Community Healthcare NHS Trust. For services to Nursing during Covid-19
- Marcus Charles Edwards Jones – Service Delivery Director, Docklands Light Railway. For services to Transport during Covid-19
- Rani Kaur – Food Services Assistant, J Sainsbury's plc. For services to the community in Bedfordshire during Covid-19
- Terence Denis Keen – For services to Health and Fitness during Covid-19
- Jennifer Keenan – For services to Women and Minority Ethnic Communities during Covid-19
- Gerald Keogh – For services to the community in Govan during Covid-19
- Hasnain Qamar Rashid Bhatti Khan – Medical Student Volunteer Co-ordinator. For services to Healthcare in South Yorkshire during Covid-19.
- Malcolm Kilpatrick – Electrician, Royal Oldham General Hospital. For services to the NHS during Covid-19
- Carole Kind – For services to the community in Staffordshire during Covid-19
- Minerva Pascual Collantes Klepacz – Matron of Ophthalmology and BAME Network Lead, Royal Bournemouth and Christchurch Hospitals NHS Foundation Trust. For services to Nursing during Covid-19
- Richard Andrew Knight – For services to the NHS during Covid-19
- Mustafa Kemal Koksal – Supervisor, First Buses. For services to the community during Covid-19
- Simon Richard Lea – General Store Manager, Asda Ltd. For services to the Covid-19 response
- Duncan Denis Leece – For services to the community in Banffshire during Covid-19
- Denny Levine – Social Care Assessor, North Yorkshire Council. For services to the community during the Covid-19 response
- Rhian Livingstone – For services to the community in Driffield, East Yorkshire during Covid-19
- John Loughton – Founder, The Scran Academy. For services to the community during Covid-19
- Eugenia Lyle – Customer Experience Colleague, J Sainsbury's plc. For services to Business and the community during Covid-19
- Paul David Mackean – Head of Laboratories, Babcock Rosyth. For services to the NHS during the Covid-19 response.
- Angus Maclean – For services to the community on the Isle of Harris during Covid-19
- Vajid Mahmood – PPM Strategy and Implementation Lead, NHS England and NHS Improvement. For services to the NHS during Covid-19
- Tracey Mairs – Registered Manager, Marple Lodge Care Home. For services to the Covid-19 response
- Manju Malhi – For services to the community in London during the Covid-19 response
- Lucy Mansell-Render – Nights Department Manager, Asda. For services to the Covid-19 response
- Belinda Alison Marks – Palliative Care Clinical Lead, Bradford District Care Foundation Trust. For services to the Covid-19 response
- Mairi McCallum – For services to the community in Moray during Covid-19
- Kathryn Fiona Mccloghrie – Head of Corporate Strategy, Sellafield Ltd. For services to Business and the community in Cumbria during the Covid-19 response
- Marie Therese McDermott – For services to Nursing in Northern Ireland during the Covid-19 response
- Gemma Patricia McDonald – Nurse and Volunteer, Newport Sea Cadets. For services to the NHS and to the community in Newport during Covid-19
- William McGhee – Oxygen Therapy Project Manager, National Services Scotland. For services to the Covid-19 response
- Sharon McKendrick – Store Manager, Morrisons. For services to the community during Covid-19
- Gary McKeown – For services to Education during the Covid-19 response
- Elizabeth Margaret McLean – Frontline Food Retail Worker, The Co-operative Group. For services to the Covid-19 response
- Helen McMahon – Home Manager, Four Seasons Healthcare. For services to Care Homes during Covid-19
- Lyndsay Jayne McNicholl – For services to Health and Social Care during Covid-19
- Karen Miles – Driver, Red Arrow. For services to Transport during Covid-19
- Jolene Miller – Train Driver, Northern Trains Ltd and Volunteer Paramedic. For services to the NHS during Covid-19
- Sharon Louise Miller – For services to the Care Sector during the Covid-19 response
- Herbert Brian Wesley Montgomery – Metro Systems & Performance Manager. For services to Public Transport in Northern Ireland during Covid-19
- Beverley Morris – CHC Lead Nurse, Black Country and West Birmingham Clinical Commissioning Groups. For services to Nursing during Covid-19
- Geoffrey Moyle – Catering Manager. For services to Catering in the NHS during Covid-19
- Lorraine Monica Mullen – For Services to the Community of Lochgelly during Covid-19
- Geoffrey Norris – Customer Delivery Driver, Asda. For services to the Covid-19 response
- Melesha Katrina O'Garro – For services to Music and Charity
- Margaret Payne – For services to the community in Lochinver during the Covid-19 response
- Tracey Ann Pearson – Senior Care Worker, Grove Lodge Care Home. For services to Care Home residents during Covid-19
- Louise Peart – Social Worker, Adult Services Intake and Assessment Team, Vale of Glamorgan Council. For services to Vulnerable People during Covid-19
- Stephen Philpott – Rough Sleeping Manager, Birmingham City Council. For services to supporting Rough Sleepers during Covid-19
- Reverend Matthew James Price – For services to the community in Gorleston, Norfolk during Covid-19
- Nilima Rahman – Bank employee, Virgin Money. For services to the Financial Services sector and the community of South Shields during Covid-19.
- Charlie Joseph Reader – Musician and Fundraiser. For charitable fundraising for the NHS and Charity during Covid-19.
- Julie Annice Redfern – For services to the community in Saffron Walden, Essex during Covid-19
- Timothy John Renshaw – For services to Vulnerable People and Tackling Homelessness during Covid-19
- Patricia Ring – For services to the community in Harpenden, Hertfordshire during Covid-19
- Emma Robb – Social Enterprise Manager, Resurgam Community Development Trust. For services to the community in Lisburn during Covid-19
- Mark Kenneth Roberts – Leader, Community Support Cell. For services to the community in Cumbria during Covid-19
- Karen Joan Rogers – For services to the community in Pumpherston, West Lothian during Covid-19.
- Catherine Ruddick – Activities Coordinator, Derwent Care Home. For services to the Care Sector during Covid-19.
- Sean Patrick Ruth QFSM – For services to the community in London during Covid-19
- Peter Ryan – Volunteer, Northampton General Hospital. For services to the NHS during Covid-19.
- Ajitha Sajeev – Street Population Manager, Newham Council. For services to the Vulnerable and Homeless in Newham during Covid-19.
- Toni Ann Salmon – Food Delivery Driver and Commanding Officer, Forest of Dean Sea Cadets. For services to the community in the Forest of Dean during Covid-19.
- Rebecca Saunders – For services to the community in Kelvedon, Essex during Covid-19
- Raymond Schofield – For services to Health and Fitness during Covid-19
- Shagufta Shamim – For services to the community in Grangemouth during Covid-19.
- David John Sharp – For services to the community in Menstrie, Clackmannanshire during Covid-19
- Melissa Mary Shearer – Personal Banker, Danske Bank. For services to the Financial Services sector and to the community in Northern Ireland during Covid-19.
- Julie Simonson – Community Branch Director, Santander UK. For services to the Financial Services sector and the community of Neath during Covid-19
- Margaret Jennifer Simpson – For services to the community in Rutland during Covid-19.
- Neeraj Kumari Singadia – Branch Manager, Lloyds Banking Group. For services to the Financial Sector and the community in Birmingham during Covid-19.
- Cleo Smith – Chief Officer, Age UK Hythe & Lyminge. For services to the community during Covid-19
- Nigel William Smith – For services to Care Home Residents during the Covid-19 response
- Adam Duncan Smith – Food Delivery Driver, Iceland Foods. For services to the community during Covid-19.
- Aaron James Sparks – Scheduler, First Buses. For services to Transport during Covid-19
- Elaine Spencer – For services to the community in Rossington, South Yorkshire during Covid-19
- Christopher Spicer – Project Leader, Zephyr Plus Ventilator Design and Build, Babcock International. For services to the Covid-19 response.
- Janet Adrienne Stewart – For services to the community in Lisburn during Covid-19
- Joanne Swaine – Area Branch Manager, Leeds Credit Union. For services to the Financial Sector and the community during Covid-19.
- Joanne Swan – Housing and Care Manager, Fountain Court, Gateshead. For services to the community during the Covid-19.
- Adam Tallis – Registered General Manager, The Kensington Care Home, Bupa. For services to Care Home residents during Covid-19.
- Kate Elizabeth Mary Tantam – Specialist Senior Sister in Intensive Care, University Hospitals Plymouth NHS Trust. For services to improving Patient Experience during Covid-19.
- Simon Taylor – Driver, First Bus. For services to the community during Covid-19.
- Kirsty Taylor – Co-ordinator, Bideford Community Centre, Greater Manchester. For services to Vulnerable Families in Wythenshawe during Covid-19.
- Winsome May Thomas – Matron for Quality and BAME Nurses and Midwives Network Chair, Imperial College Healthcare NHS Trust. For services to Nursing during Covid-19.
- Wayne Saville Tranmer – For services to the community in Castle Donington, Leicestershire during Covid-19
- Sarah Troop – Director, Maldon & District Community Voluntary Service. For services to the community in the Maldon District, Essex during Covid-19.
- Joshua Trueman – Owner, JT Workshop. For services to Key Workers during Covid-19.
- Faisal Tuddy – Superintendent Pharmacist, Asda Ltd. For services to the Pharmaceutical Sector during Covid-19.
- Matthew Turner – Operational Control Manager, Santander UK. For services to the Financial Sector and the community in Bradford during Covid-19.
- Kirsten Urquhart – For services to Young People in Scotland during Covid-19
- Claire Uwins – For services to the community in Much Hadham, Hertfordshire during Covid-19
- Councillor Nicola Angela Verner – Joint Chief Executive Officer, Greater Shankill Partnership. For services to the community in Belfast during Covid-19.
- Maciel Pestana Vinagre – Assistant Manager Hotel Services, Ashford and St Peter's Hospitals NHS Foundation Trust. For services to the NHS during Covid-19.
- Marian Catherine Wandrag – Founder, Marian Newman Nails. For services to the Beauty Industry during Covid-19
- Alan Warke – For services to the community in Londonderry during Covid-19
- Pamela Webb JP – For services to the community in Swindon during Covid-19
- Nigel Wheeler – Prosperity, Development and Frontline Services Lead, Rhondda Cynon Taf Borough Council. For services to Waste Collection and Recycling during Covid-19
- Elizabeth Grace White – For services to the community in Longstanton, Cambridgeshire during Covid-19.
- Elizabeth Williams – Coordinator, Canolfan Pentre. For services to the community of Pentre during the Covid-19 response.
- Nigel Williams – For services to Local Government in Swansea during Covid-19
- Alison Williams – For services to the NHS and Charity during Covid-19.
- Sarah Wilson – Nursery teacher, Fishergate Primary School. For services to Education during Covid-19.
- Kyle Robert Samuel Wilson – For services to the community in Blairgowrie during Covid-19
- Emma Wimpress – Head of Volunteer Services, Northampton General Hospital. For services to the NHS during Covid-19
- Jacqueline Woollett – Home Manager, Oakshade Abbeyfield Chichester Society. For services to Care Home residents during Covid-19.
- Theodore Dimigen Wride – For services to the community in Sunderland during the Covid-19 response.
- Samuel David Young – For services to the community in Castlederg, County Tyrone during Covid-19
- Margaret Carole Zambonini – For services to those with Dementia and their Carers during Covid-19.

Civil (non-COVID related)

- Edith Ann Adams – For services to the community in Fleet, Hampshire
- Michelle Alford – For services to Public Libraries
- Robert Allen – Lately Firefighter, Avon Fire and Rescue Service. For services to the Fire and Rescue Service in Bristol
- Kathleen Christina Anderson – For services to the community in Strathdon and Upper Donside, Aberdeenshire
- Myra Anne Andrews – For services to Performing Arts and Young People
- Christine Margaret Annis – Centre Manager, Downside Fisher Youth Club. For services to Young People in Bermondsey, London
- James Irwin Armstrong – Manager, Laburnum Boat Club. For voluntary service to Young People in Hackney, London
- Alexander Stewart Auld – For services to the Royal National Lifeboat Institution and the community in North Berwick
- Mohammed Aziz – Chief Inspector, Bedfordshire Police. For services to Policing and Diversity
- Dorothy Bailey – For services to the Scouting Movement and to the community in Staffordshire
- Herbert John Hastings Bailie – For services to People with Disabilities and Older People in Northern Ireland
- Margaret Ann Baker – Clinical Nurse, Specialist Secondary Breast Oncology, Swansea Bay University Health Board. For services to Patients with Secondary Breast Cancer in South Wales
- William Michael Roger Bankes-Jones – For services to Opera and Diversity
- Adrian Barker – Senior Policy Adviser, Home and Local Energy, Department for Business, Energy and Industrial Strategy. For services to Race Advocacy
- Audrey Barr – Project Manager, Women in Sport and Physical Activity. For services to the community in West Belfast
- Muriel Evelyn Barr – For services to the Northern Ireland Hospice
- Michael Wesley Barrett – For services to the community in Cheltenham, Gloucestershire
- Kenneth John Barsby – For services to the community in Elmesthorpe, Leicestershire
- Dorothy Baverstock – Member, Test Valley Borough Council. For services to the community in Romsey, Hampshire
- Marion Kathleen Beagley – For services to the community in Cheltenham, Gloucestershire
- Eileen Elizabeth Bellett – For services to the community in Osmotherley, North Yorkshire
- Tanya Faith Bennett – Commissioner, Goyt Division, Girlguides and Senior Coach, Spartac Gymnastics Club, Ormskirk. For voluntary service to Young People in North West England
- Andrew Bentley – For services to Libraries and the Arts
- Adrian Bingley – For services to the community in Sutton-in-Ashfield, Nottinghamshire
- Paul John Birch JP – For services to the UK Music Industry
- Raymond Michael Blowers – For services to the community in Spelthorne, Surrey
- Dr Sharyn Bord – Coach and Club President, Cambridge Diving Development Centre. For voluntary service to Diving in Cambridgeshire
- Kimberley Bottomley – For services to the community in Clerkenwell, London
- Hazel Jean Bound – Volunteer, Cornwall and Devon, Long Distance Walking Association. For voluntary service to Walking in South West England
- Christine Ann Bown – For services to the community in Keighley, West Yorkshire
- Rosemarie Brady – Co-Founder, Coventry Resource Centre for the Blind. For services to Visually Impaired People
- Paul Thomas Braham – Volunteer, Newry Lions Club. For services to charity
- Pamela Susan Brannigan – For services to the community in North Hertfordshire
- Fiona Maureen Brannon – For services to the community in Barnes, London
- Christopher Robert Britton – For voluntary service to Young People and the community in Guildford, Surrey
- David Brown – General Duties Co-ordinator, RAF High Wycombe. For services to the Royal Aviation Air Force and to Aviation Heritage
- Ian Michael Brown – For voluntary service to the Church Lads' and Church Girls' Brigade in Standish, Metropolitan Borough of Wigan
- Pauline Buller – For services to the community in Aghalee, County Antrim
- Brian Robert Burgess – Trustee, Brentford Football Club Community Sports Trust. For voluntary service to Football
- Harold John Burkhill BEM – For services to Macmillan Cancer Support
- Edna Mabel Cahill – For services to the community in Exeter, Devon
- Kevin Calpin – For services to the Traditional Craft of Architectural Stonemasonry
- Barbara Mary Cameron – Manager, Ireland International Ladies' Outdoor Bowls Team. For services to Lawn Bowls in Northern Ireland
- Paul Carey – Member, Glasgow City Council. For public service and for services to the community in Drumchapel, Glasgow
- Christine Carrothers – Senior Clerical Officer, McClay Library, Queen's University, Belfast. For services to Higher Education
- David Hugh Chambers – For services to the community in Churchill, Oxfordshire
- Paul Jonathan Chaplow – For services to Clay Pigeon Shooting
- Tina Jane Chapman – For services to the community in Templecombe, Somerset
- Cedric Raymond John Charlton – President, Richmond Squadron, RAF Air Cadets. For voluntary service to Young People
- Robert Cheesman – For voluntary service to the community in East Sussex
- Valerie Clark – For services to Blind People in Greater London
- Barry Clark – Head, Breaks Manor Youth Centre and lately Special Inspector, Hertfordshire Special Constabulary. For services to Young People and the community in Hatfield, Hertfordshire
- Gavin Denness Clark – For voluntary service to Scouting in Basingstoke, Hampshire
- Grenville Langham Clarke – For services to the Environment and the community in Suffolk
- Stephen Clarke – Lately Director, Tennis Wales and Member of the Council, Lawn Tennis Association. For services to Tennis in Wales
- Alan David Clarke – Founder, The Alchemy Charitable Trust. For services to charity in Sussex and West Kent
- David Anthony Clarke – Sergeant, Durham Constabulary. For services to Policing
- Vera Margaret Collings – For services to the community in Winchester, Hampshire
- David Alfred Collins – Vice-Chairman, Haywards Heath Branch, Royal British Legion. For services to the Ex-Service community in West Sussex
- Courtney-Lee Collins – For services to the community in Thurrock, Essex
- Stella Connell – Chief Executive, Birchwood Centre. For services to Homeless and Vulnerable People in Skelmersdale, Lancashire
- Susan Margaret Connelly – For services to the community in Romford, London Borough of Havering
- Catherine Louise Cooper – District Scout Commissioner. For services to Children and Young People in Rossendale, Lancashire
- Margaret Elizabeth Copland – For services to the community in Monifeith, Angus
- Philip James Courage – For services to the community in Bradford-on-Avon, Wiltshire
- Margaret Joan Magdalene Coutts – For services to the Falkirk and Central Scotland Samaritans and the community in Falkirk
- Marjorie Elizabeth Thelma Covey – For services to the community in Wellington, Somerset
- Geoffrey Cowan – Community Safety Officer, Cullercoats Lifeboat Station. For voluntary service to the Royal National Lifeboat Institution
- Peter John Cowley – For voluntary service to the Boys' Brigade in Tottenham and Ponders End, London
- Peter Crawford – For voluntary service to Gymnastics in the North of England
- Norman Crooks – Race Secretary, Cookstown and District Motorcycle Club. For voluntary service to Motorcycle Racing in Northern Ireland
- David Cummings – For services to the community in Chester
- John Joseph Curneen – For services to Sport and the community in Omagh, County Tyrone
- Keith Daniel – Volunteer, Army Cadet Force. For services to Young People
- Dr John Danks – Assistant Group Scout Leader, 1st Petteril Vale Scouts. For voluntary service to Young People and to the community in Eden, Cumbria
- Joanne Dare – Chief Executive, Age UK, Isle of Wight. For services to Older People
- Ian Darler – For services to Cambridge United Football Club and charity
- Tracey Davies – Volunteer Fundraiser, Velindre Cancer Centre's Charity. For charitable services to Cancer Patients
- Stephen Robert Davies – For services to People with Disabilities
- Ceri Denise Davies – Founder and Managing Director, More Mascots Please CIC. For services to People with Disabilities, Disadvantaged and Life Limited Children and their Families
- Lilian Day – For services to the community in Royton, Greater Manchester
- Amolak Singh Dhariwal – CFO Global Supply Management and Service Operations, Sodexo. For services to Business
- Jean Marie Dixon – Fundraiser and Ambassador, Yorkshire Air Ambulance. For services to charity and Patients in Yorkshire
- Valerie Judith Dixon Henry – Member, Waverley Borough Council. For services to the community in Ewhurst, Surrey
- Louise Doble – Chair, ACE Youth Trust. For voluntary service to Disadvantaged Young People in Ashbourne, Derbyshire
- Charles Donaghy – Lately Games Secretary, Durham Club and Institute Union. For services to Grassroots Sport in North East England
- Raymond Alexander Dowey – Lately Permanent Way Worker, Northern Ireland Railways. For services to Public Transport
- Helen Margaret Duncan – For services to the Children's Hearings System and the community in Glenrothes, Fife
- Jennifer Ann Dunn – For services to the community in Cannock, Staffordshire
- Rhona Dunn – For services to the community in Morpeth, Northumberland
- Valerie Dyke – For services to the community in New Ash Green, Kent
- Brian Edwards – For voluntary service to the Scouts in Thurrock, Essex
- Jean Ellershaw – For services to the community in Elworth, Sandbach, Cheshire
- Agnes Rae Elliott – For services to the community in Cowie, Stirlingshire
- Gwyneth Margaret Evans – For services to the community in Fishguard, Pembrokeshire
- Elizabeth Ann Evans – For voluntary and charitable services in Oxfordshire
- Anne Pauline Ewin – Mentor, Mulberry School for Girls. For services to Secondary Education in the London Borough of Tower Hamlets
- Jill Christine Eyre – For services to the community in Edenbridge, Kent
- Ryan Alan Robert Farquhar – For services to Motorcycle Racing
- Patrick Lee Wayne Farr – For services to Children's Hospices in South West England
- Robert Leslie Feltwell – For services to the community in Bentley, Suffolk
- Roger Stuart Fenton – Specialist Team Manager, Cheshire West and Chester Council. For services to People with Learning Disabilities in Cheshire
- Dr Elizabeth Olive Victoria Ferris – Founder and Chair, Dundee Dragons Wheelchair Sports Club. For services to Disability Sport in Scotland
- John Fisher – Founder, We Sing U Sing. For services to Education
- Theresa Ann Fisher – Community Champion, Tesco Stores Ltd. For services to the Economy and the community in Gloucester
- William Arthur Fleming – For services to Music through Ballyclare Victoria Flute Band
- Pauline Fletcher – Visitor Centre Co-ordinator, HM Prison Whatton. For services to Prisoners and their Families
- Charles Peter Flint – Co-Founder, Evergreens Table Tennis Club. For services to Sport for Older People in North East Scotland
- Robert Alan Forrester – Lately Lifeboat Operations Manager, Flint Lifeboat Station. For voluntary and charitable services to the Royal National Lifeboat Institution in North East Wales
- Kathleen Anne Forsyth – For services to the Northamptonshire Festival of Dance
- Antonia Forte – For services to Education, Housing and the community in Barry, Vale of Glamorgan
- Norman Mcleod Buchan Fraser – President, Ellon Branch, Royal British Legion Scotland. For services to the community in Ellon, Aberdeenshire
- Enid Elizabeth Freeman – Chair, Duston Old People's Welfare Association. For services to Older People
- Jacqueline Gavin – Trans Activist. For services to Gender Equality
- Peter William Gaw – Chief Executive Officer, Inspire: Culture, Learning and Libraries. For services to Libraries and Culture
- Colin William Gibbs – President, Tewit Youth Band. For voluntary service to Young People in Harrogate, North Yorkshire
- Leslie Gibson – Secretary and Head Coach, Aycliffe Amateur Boxing Club. For voluntary service to Young People in Newton Aycliffe, County Durham
- John Alfred Glenn – For services to the community in Londonderry
- Eve Glicksman – For services to Holocaust Education and Awareness
- Sheila Goater – For services to the community in Oakhanger, Hampshire
- Aileen Isabella Graham – Deputy Chair, City Growth and Regeneration Committee. For public service
- Susan Nat Graham – Founder and Chief Executive, Jaspal's Voice. For services to People with Motor Neurone Disease in the Asian community
- Desmond Davison Graham – For services to the community in Carrickfergus, County Antrim
- Florence Yvonne Grainger – For services to the community in Masham, North Yorkshire
- James William Graves – Chair, Merseyside Adventure Sailing Trust. For voluntary service to Young People in Merseyside
- Antony Victor Greenham – For services to the community in Beaminster, Dorset
- Patricia Lucy Griffiths – Co-Founder, Coventry Resource Centre for the Blind. For services to Visually Impaired People
- Joy Nancy Guy – For services to Education
- Alun Guy – For services to Music, Language and Culture in Wales
- Stanley Hacking – For services to Charitable Fundraising
- Nigel Stephen Hailey – County Commissioner, Scout Association. For voluntary service to Young People in Warwickshire
- Rosemary Caroline Haines – Leader, First Hawne Brownie Pack. For voluntary service to Children and Young People in Halesowen, West Midlands
- Margaret Maureen Hamer – For services to the community in Church Stretton, Shropshire
- Margaret Campbell Hamilton – For services to the community in Cookstown, County Tyrone
- Susan Hoyt Handley – For services to the community in Ewhurst, Surrey
- Samuel Edwin Harper – Lately Junior Convenor, Holywood Golf Club, County Down. For services to Junior Golf in Northern Ireland
- Clive John Harry – For services to the community in Knowle, Bristol
- Amelia Robertson Hay – For services to charity in West, Central and East Scotland
- Susan Esther Hayes – For services to the community in Winsford, Somerset
- Jill Hedgecock – For services to Girlguiding and the community in Clapham Park, London
- Margaret Jacinta Hegarty – Lately Vice Principal, Steelstown Primary School, Londonderry. For services to Education
- Mark John Henderson – Community Safety Team Leader, County Durham and Darlington Fire and Rescue Service. For services to People with Dementia
- Susan Elizabeth Hey – For services to Cancer Research and charity in Nairn
- Samuel Mathew James Hey – For services to Cancer Research and charity in Nairn
- Margaret Elizabeth Highton – Director, Evermoor Hub. For services to the community in West Lancashire
- Paula Jayne Hills – For services to Tax Credit Customers and the community in North East England
- Andrew William Hirst – For voluntary service to Leukaemia Research and to Lagan Search and Rescue, Belfast
- Peter John Hoare – For services to Cinema
- Lowry Noel Hodgett – For services to Business in County Down
- Alwyn Edward Hodgett – For services to Community Newspaper Publishing in County Down
- Janet Holden – For services to Public Libraries
- Pauline Holt – For services to the community in Thorncombe, Dorset
- Ruth Honegan – Constable, Bedfordshire Police. For services to Policing and Diversity
- Susan Jean Hopcroft – Guide Co-ordinator, West Lancashire. For voluntary service to Children and Young People
- William Robert Howard – For voluntary service to Hockey and Golf in Northern Ireland
- Susan Jane Howden – For voluntary service to Girlguiding in Sefton, Merseyside
- Hera Hussain – Founder and Chief Executive Officer, Chayn. For services to charity
- Norman Neil Mccoll Hutchison – Childline Volunteer. For services to Young People in Scotland
- Freda Elizabeth Ingall – Founder and lately Chair, Nottingham Cancer Patients and Carers Support Group. For services to people with Cancer and their Carers
- Sonia Katherine Mary Inkster – For services to the community in Scalloway, Shetland Isles
- Renate Fanny Inow – For services to Holocaust Education and Awareness
- Luci Claire Isaacson (Scholes) – For services to Flood Risk Management in Cornwall
- Lord Celal Izcibayar – President, UK Turkish Scouting. For voluntary service to Scouting in the Turkish-Cypriot community in the UK
- Peter Jackson – For services to the community in Tamworth, Staffordshire
- Parbir Kaur Jagpal – Lead for Equality, Diversity and Inclusion, University of Birmingham. For services to Diversity and Inclusion in Health
- Jayne James – Lately Journalist, British Broadcasting Corporation. For services to charity and the community in Wales
- Paul David Jameson – Fundraiser, Motor Neurone Disease Association. For charitable services to People with Motor Neurone Disease
- Cyril Jancey – For voluntary service to the Scouts in Brighton, East Sussex
- Henry Robert Jenner – For services to the community in Halifax, West Yorkshire
- Casyo Johnson – Musician. For services to Music and the community in Croydon
- Ursula Mary Johnston – For services to the community in Aldershot, Hampshire and Elstead, Surrey
- Albert Paul Jolly – For services to Lions International and the community in Solihull, West Midlands
- Jennifer Jones – For services to the community in Little Leigh, Cheshire
- Brian Keech – For services to the community in Cranford, Northamptonshire
- Thomas Meria Kenny – Estates Supervisor, Police Scotland College, Tulliallan. For services to Policing and the community in Tulliallan
- Hannah Patricia Kentish – Lately UK Youth Commissioner, Scout Association. For voluntary service to Scouting and Young People
- Elizabeth Anne Keys – For services to Road Safety in Northern Ireland
- Hana Kleiner – For services to Holocaust Education and Awareness
- Thomas Komoly – For services to Holocaust Education and Awareness
- Dr Marcel Ladenheim – For services to Holocaust Education and Awareness
- Professor Peter Laszlo Lantos – For services to Holocaust Education and Awareness
- John Leonard Lawson – For services to the community in Portaferry, County Down
- Ronald Leslie – For services to the community in Angus
- Elizabeth Frances Lewis – For services to the community in Church Stretton, Shropshire
- Lieutenant Colonel (Rtd) Michael Hugh Ledston Lewis – Chair and Fundraiser, SSAFA Powys. For charitable services
- David Thomas Lillicrap – For voluntary service to the Army Cadet Force in Devon
- Brian Irving Logan – For services to Drama and the Performing Arts in Northern Ireland
- Donna Loveland – Fundraiser, Scarborough Lifeboat Station. For charitable services to the Royal National Lifeboat Institution
- Jeffrey Lunn – For services to Nature Conservation in Yorkshire
- Sheila Lymer – For services to the community in Boston, Lincolnshire
- Dr Wendy June Madgwick – For charitable services in Deal, Kent
- Gordon Thomas Main – Coach, Nairn Road Runners. For services to Athletics in Nairn, Scotland
- Terence Hamilton Malcolm – For services to Road Safety in Northern Ireland
- Colin Hayden Malkin – Group Scout Leader, Scouts. For services to Young People in Melling, Merseyside
- Irene Maloney – For services to People with Disabilities and Guide Dogs UK
- Leslie Greer Marshall – For services to the Royal Ulster Constabulary George Cross Parents' Association
- Sandra Mason – For services to the community in South Hetton, County Durham
- David James Mason – Community Safety Patrol Officer, Basingstoke and Deane Borough Council. For services to Homeless People in Basingstoke, Hampshire
- Alan McBride – For services to Music in Northern Ireland
- Thomas Robert McCormick QPM – For services to the Boys' Brigade and to Young People in Northern Ireland
- John Rodney McCullough – For services to Maritime and Industrial Heritage in the Titanic Quarter, Belfast
- Anna McGee – Volunteer. For services to Homeless People in Coventry, West Midlands
- Alexander Michael McGowan – For services to Amateur Boxing and the community in Ellesmere Port, Cheshire
- Yasmin McGrath – For services to the community in Ellesmere Port and West Cheshire
- Martin McHale – Conductor, City of Cardiff Symphony Orchestra. For services to Music
- Helen Mary McHugh – Honorary Events and Welfare Adviser, Royal National Lifeboat Institution. For services to Retired Staff
- James McIlorum – For services to Young People in Newtownards, County Down
- Mairi Ann McIntyre – For services to the community in Wigtownshire
- Irene Edith McKee – Founder and Secretary, Friends of Armagh County Museum. For services to History and Heritage in County Armagh
- Conor McKevitt – Team Member, WorldSkills UK. For services to the WorldSkills Competition
- Phoebe Leigh McLavy – Team Member, WorldSkills UK. For services to the WorldSkills Competition
- John Wallace Alexander McLellan – Lately Veterans Helpline Operator, Veterans Enquiry Centre. For services to Defence and to the community in Lancashire
- Elizabeth Ann Meade – Team Leader, Passenger Services and Corporate Finance Advisory, Department for Transport. For public service
- Mayameen Meftahi – For services to Victims of Child Sexual Abuse in Wales
- Jake Julian Barrington Meyer – For services to Mountaineering, Young People and charity
- Sufu Miah – For services to the community in Oswestry, Shropshire
- Laura Jane Millward – Run Director, Penrose Parkrun, Helston. For voluntary and charitable services to the community in Cornwall
- Kurshida Mirza – Volunteer Organiser, Great Get Together Iftar and Truby's Garden Tea Room (Inter Faith Cafe). For services to Inter Faith and Community Cohesion in Milton Keynes, Buckinghamshire
- Andrew Henry Mitchell – For services to the community in Blackpool, Lancashire
- Ruby Mitchell – For services to the community in Carluke, Lanarkshire
- Shaun Michael Moody – Group Manager, South Wales Fire and Rescue Service. For services to Search and Rescue
- Gloria Alexandra Moore – For services to People with Parkinson's Disease in Northern Ireland
- David Moreton – General Manager, Oak Tree Farm Rural Project. For services to People with Learning Disabilities in Staffordshire
- Michael George Philip Naylor – Chair, Cardio Gym Club, University Hospitals Birmingham NHS Foundation Trust. For services to Cardiac Rehabilitation
- Mervyn Needham – Voluntary Manager, Worcestershire Wildlife Trust. For services to Conservation and the community in Chaddesley Corbett, Worcestershire
- Hazel Lillian Nelson – Practice Nurse, Cobridge Surgery and Queen's Nurse. For services to Nursing and the community in Staffordshire
- Samuel George Nicholl – For services to the Northern Ireland Ambulance Service and the community in Northern Ireland
- Eleanor Denise Nicol – For services to the community in Rye, East Sussex
- Julia Northen – For services to the community in Grimsby
- Christine Joan O'Reilly – For services to the community in Cambridge
- Teleola Atoke Martha Ilori Oganla – Founder, Teleola Martha Christian Organisation. For services to the community in South East London
- Folashade Oginni – Chair, Carer's Network, Department for Transport. For services to Carers in the Department for Transport
- Tinuola Oni – Project Management Support Officer, Department for Environment, Food and Rural Affairs. For public and charitable services
- Donna Orphan – For services to the community in St Germans, Cornwall
- Dr Richard Edward Painter – For services to the community in Swindon, Staffordshire
- Barrie Stuart Palmer – Founder and Trustee, Somerset Unit for Radiotherapy Equipment. For services to Cancer Treatment
- Alan Frank Pannell – For services to the community in the London Borough of Hillingdon
- David Malcolm Parlons – For services to the Jewish Community in London
- Joy Lorainne Pendleton – Nursery Assistant, Castlereagh Nursery School. For services to Early Years Education
- Patricia Percival – For services to the community in Stanhope, County Durham
- Valerie Anne Peterkin – Assistant Leader, Girlguide Group, Bermondsey. For voluntary service to Young People in Rotherhithe and Bermondsey, London
- Roy Frederick Pickles – For services to the community in Buxton, Derbyshire
- Emma Picton-Jones – Founder, the DPJ Foundation. For services to charity
- Richard Gerard Pollins – For services to the Motor Neurone Disease Association
- Celia Dorothy Powis – Popmobility Fitness Instructor. For services to the community in Worthing, West Sussex
- Jane Rosemary Pratt – For services to the community in Menston, West Yorkshire
- Parminder Singh Purewal – Director, The Normandy Hotel. For services to Hospitality in Renfrew
- Shirley Margaret Quemby – Lately Trustee, downsyndrome OK. For services to People with Disabilities
- Jonathan Rea – For services to Music in Northern Ireland
- Gail Margaret Elizabeth Redmond – For services to the community in Dromore, County Down
- Sandra Anne Rees – Manager, Community Impact Team, Scarborough Borough Council. For services to the community in Scarborough, North Yorkshire
- Teresa Carol Ricketts – For voluntary service to Girlguiding in Plymouth, Devon
- Peter Ridler – For services to the community in Yeovil, Somerset
- Robert Graham Ritchie – Chieftain, Newtonmore Camanachd Club. For services to Shinty and the community in Newtonmore, Inverness-shire
- David George Robins – Honorary Secretary, North Staffordshire Grenadier Guards Association. For services to Veterans in North Staffordshire
- Patricia Ruddle – For services to the community in Rutland
- Elizabeth Joyce Rutherford – For services to Children with Disabilities and their Families in Edinburgh
- Farzaneh Saadat – Manager, Cecil Court Residential Home. For services to Older People with Dementia
- Parveen Sajid – For services to Vulnerable People in Lebanon and to the community in Glasgow
- David Edward Sales – For services to Commercial Fishing and the Marine Environment in Lyme Bay, South West England
- David Michael Saunders – For services to charity in Beaconsfield, Buckinghamshire
- Julie Anne Scurfield – Founder and Chair, Chester-le-Street Amazons Girls' Football Club. For voluntary service to Girls' Football in Chester-le-Street, County Durham
- Robert Mcdonald Johnston Shanks – For services to the Seaforth Highlanders Regimental Association and the community in Culloden, Inverness and Dingwall
- Elizabeth Ann Shannon – Senior Clerical Assistant, Ochiltree Primary School. For services to Education and Sport in East Ayrshire
- Susan Josephine Sheppard – Lately Biodiversity Officer, Staffordshire County Council. For services to the Environment
- Matthew Martin Shields – For services to Running in Northern Ireland
- Elizabeth Margaret Sillery – For services to the community in Belfast
- Dr Satyavir Singhal – For services to the community in Belfast
- Christopher David Singletary – For services to Veterans, their Families and the Armed Forces
- Jill Rosemary Slatter – For voluntary service to Athletics and the community in Oxfordshire
- Linda Smallthwaite – For voluntary service to Girlguiding on the Wirral
- Andrew Leonard Smith – Catering Senior Officer, HMP Maghaberry. For services to HMP Maghaberry in Northern Ireland
- Sarah Smith – For services to Public Libraries
- Jean Carol Sowten – Manager, Sevenoaks Day Nursery. For services to Education
- Muriel Anne Stapleton – Captain, 2nd Plymouth Girls' Brigade. For voluntary service to Young People in Plymouth, Devon
- Elfriede Starer – For services to Holocaust Education and Awareness
- Kevin Charles Staveley – For services to Chess in Wales
- Lee Anne Steel – For services to Rugby and the community in Livingston
- Sarah Elizabeth Stewart – For services to the community in Markethill and Mountnorris, County Armagh
- Wilfrid Blake Stimpson – Member, Brackley Town Council. For services to the community in Brackley, Northamptonshire
- Pauline Stirling – For voluntary service to Disability Sport in Aberdeenshire
- Katharine Diana St John-Brooks – President, Link Age Southwark. For services to Older People and the community in Southwark, London
- John Stobbart – Coxwain, Royal National Lifeboat Institution, Workington, Cumbria. For voluntary service to Maritime Safety
- Julian Stone – For services to charity
- Gary Stringer – For services to Vulnerable People and the community in Derbyshire
- Rina Surjan – For services to the BAME community in Greater Manchester
- Julian Francis Tagg – Chair, Exeter City Community Trust. For services to Sport and the community in Exeter, Devon
- Nicholas John Tanner – Lately Lead Nurse for Homelessness, Medway Community Healthcare. For services to Homeless People in London and Medway
- Martin John Griffin Tapp – For services to Flood Risk Management in Kent
- Thomas Taylor – Assistant Director, Security and Operations, University of Worcester. For services to Student Wellbeing and Fundraising
- Susan Therese Taylor – Manager, Benefits Service, Cheshire West and Chester Council. For services to Local Government
- Malcolm Temple – Member, Eden District Council. For services to Local Government in Cumbria
- Bharat Thakrar – For voluntary and charitable services in the UK and Abroad
- Anne Thomas – Staff Nurse, Betsi Cadwaladr University Health Board. For services to Nursing
- Geraint Andrew Thomas – For services to the Samaritans, Mountain Rescue and Disadvantaged People in South West Wales
- Ian Cooper Thomson – Secretary, Lumphanan Branch, Royal British Legion Scotland. For voluntary service to the Ex-Service community in Aberdeenshire
- Margaret Elizabeth Tracey – Director, Mudchute Farm. For services to the community in the Isle of Dogs, London
- Joseph Luke Trusselle – Sergeant, West Midlands Police. For services to Neighbourhood Policing
- Bronwen Mary Tyler – For services to the community in Thompson, Norfolk
- Roger Henry Tym – For services to the community in Stockbridge, Hampshire
- Lesley Anne Elizabeth Utting – Instructor and Detachment Commander, Suffolk Army Cadet Force. For voluntary service to Young People
- Mark Wakefield – Vice-Chair, UK Youth. For services to Young People
- Nigel John Walker – Prison Officer, HM Prisons, Northern Ireland. For services to the Northern Ireland Prison Service
- Phillip Owen Wallace – Chairman, Stevenage Football Club. For services to Association Football and the community in Hertfordshire
- David Glyn Walters – For services to Tennis and Young People in Garw Valley, Mid Glamorgan
- Stephen James Walters – Principal Library Manager, Gateshead Library Service. For services to Public Libraries.
- Margaret Gail Walthall – For voluntary service to Scouting in Heywood, Metropolitan Borough of Rochdale
- Stephen Walthall – For voluntary service to Scouting in Heywood, Metropolitan Borough of Rochdale
- Peter John Christopher Ward – Driver, Volunteering in Health. For voluntary service to the community in South Devon
- Anne Elizabeth Ward – For services to the community in Burton-on-Trent, Staffordshire
- Kenneth Warren – For services to the community in St Austell, Cornwall
- Nicholas Ian Watson – For voluntary service to Scouting in Rastrick, West Yorkshire
- Kevin Webber – Volunteer, Prostate Cancer UK. For services to People with Cancer
- Martin Charles Webster – Group Scout Leader, 11th Bristol Air Scouts. For voluntary service to Scouting and the community in Bishopsworth, Bristol
- Jason Wenlock – Chief Inspector, Kent Police. For services to Policing and Young People
- Mary Elizabeth Whibley – For services to the community in Bude, Cornwall
- Denise Williams – For voluntary service to Girlguiding in Hartlepool, Cleveland
- Desmond Rex Williams – For services to Snooker and Billiards
- John Williams – Constable, Greater Manchester Police. For services to Policing and charity
- Ronald David Williamson – For services to the community in Bishops Waltham, Hampshire
- Valerie Clara Williamson – For services to the community in North Buckinghamshire
- Laurie Walter Wills – Founder, The Residents Enjoyment and Entertainment Society. For services to Disabled People in Epsom, Surrey
- Judith Winifred Anne Wilson – For services to the community in Sandbach, Cheshire
- Graham Wilson – Special Constable, Police Scotland. For services to Law and Order in the Scottish Borders
- Karl Wilson – Musician. For services to Music and the community in Croydon
- Graham Witter – Organiser and Founder, Weston Christmas Light Display. For services to Charitable Fundraising and to the community in Crewe
- Audrey Wood – For services to the Royal National Lifeboat Institution in North East Scotland
- Mandy Wood (Thomas) – Campaigner, Women's Aid Federation of England. For services to Charitable Fundraising
- Joseph William Woods – For services to the community in Lytham St Annes, Fylde and Wyre, Lancashire
- Gary Leslie Woods – For services to the community in Preston, Lancashire
- Karen Wray – Executive Assistant, Northern Ireland Judiciary. For services to the Judiciary and charity
- Thomas Geoffrey Yeadon – President, Cave Diving Group of Great Britain and Northern Ireland. For services to Cave Diving
- Joanna Julia Yelland – Strategic Director, Exeter City Council. For services to Reducing Health Inequalities
- Marie Zsigmond – Midwife for Safeguarding, Manchester University NHS Foundation Trust. For services to Maternity Safeguarding in the NHS

Honorary

- Pa Assan Badjan – Emergency Services Porter, Royal London Hospital Emergency Department For services to the NHS
- Ashraf Hamido Desouki – Chair, A Better Tomorrow community group For service to supporting refugees and asylum seekers in Halton Borough during the COVID-19 Pandemic
- Onyinye Aureola Enwezor – Shared Governance Clinical Educator, Nottingham University Hospitals NHS Trust For services to the NHS
- Bukola Muhydeen Olamijuwon – Welfare Secretary, Nasrul-Lahi-L-Faith Society (Nasfat) Millwall Branch For services to Nasfat UK and Ireland during COVID-19

=== Royal Red Cross ===
Royal Red Cross ribbon

==== Associates of the Royal Red Cross (ARRC) ====
- Major Johan Dews
- Flight Lieutenant Jacqueline Mckinnon
- Staff Sergeant Helen Marshall
- Sergeant Siobhan Davis
- Warrant Officer Class 1 Richard Lazarus

=== Queen's Police Medal (QPM) ===
Queen's Police Medal ribbon

England and Wales

- Sergeant Deborah Jane Ashthorpe, Hampshire Constabulary
- Chief Inspector Manjit Kaur Atwal, Leicestershire Police
- Antony Nathaniel Blaker, Deputy Chief Constable, Kent Police
- Sarah Boycott, Lately Assistant Chief Constable, West Midlands Police
- Superintendent Trevor John Clark, Ministry of Defence Police
- Charles David Crichlow, Lately Constable, Greater Manchester Police
- Constable Thomas Graham Albert Farrell, Suffolk Constabulary
- Joanne Tracy Folan, Lately Detective Constable, City of London Police
- Detective Chief Inspector Catherine Anne Forsyth, British Transport Police
- Carl Jason Foulkes, Chief Constable, North Wales Police
- Constable Rani Kaur Gundhu, West Midlands Police
- Rodney Maibom Hansen, Chief Constable, Gloucestershire Constabulary
- Simon Mason, Lately Detective Chief Superintendent, North Yorkshire Police / National Crime Agency
- Sergeant Mohammed Najib, West Midlands Police
- Natalie Louise Shaw, Lately Chief Superintendent, South Yorkshire Police
- Colin Stott, Lately Detective Chief Superintendent, Leicestershire Police
- Detective Chief Inspector John Alan Swinfield, Metropolitan Police Service
- Paul Jeffrey Withers, Lately Detective Superintendent, Lancashire Constabulary

Northern Ireland

- Constable Anthony Kerr, Police Service of Northern Ireland
- Constable David John Smyth, Police Service of Northern Ireland
- Chief Superintendent Simon Walls, Police Service of Northern Ireland

=== Queen's Fire Service Medal (QFSM) ===
Queen's Fire Service Medal ribbon

England and Wales

- Mark Andrew Cashin, Chief Fire Officer & Chief Executive, Cheshire Fire and Rescue Service
- Julie King, Group Manager, East Sussex Fire and Rescue Service
- Sean Julian Bone-Knell, Lately Assistant Chief Fire Officer & Director Operations, Kent Fire and Rescue Service
- Christopher Lowther, Chief Fire Officer, Tyne and Wear Fire and Rescue Service

=== Queen's Ambulance Medal (QAM) ===
Queen's Ambulance Medal ribbon

England and Wales

- Paul John Henry, Operational Leadership, East of England Ambulance Service NHS Trust
- Richard James Marlow, Paramedic and Lead Manager for Helicopter Emergency Medical Services, South Western Ambulance Service NHS Foundation Trust
- Ian Michael Price, Emergency Medical Technician, Welsh Ambulance Services NHS Trust

Northern Ireland

- Elizabeth Lawrence Coulter, Ambulance Service Area Manager, Northern Ireland

=== Queen's Volunteer Reserves Medal (QVRM) ===
Queen's Volunteer Reserves Medal ribbon

- Colour Sergeant David Hill, Royal Marines
- Captain Hisham Bahjat Halawi
- Colonel Robert Stuart Thomas Murphy
- Colonel Mark Andrew Simpson
- Major David Arthur Titheridge
- Lieutenant Colonel Llewelyn Tremayne Williams

== Crown Dependencies ==
Guernsey

- Paul Whitfield OBE
- Nicola Brink MBE
- Matthew Dorrian MBE
- Mary Putra MBE
- Rachel Copeland BEM

Jersey

- Ivan Muscat MBE
- Patrick Armstrong MBE
- Megan Mathias MBE
- Nick Winsor MBE

Isle of Man

- David Ashford MBE
- Mark Kenyon MBE
- Thelma Lomax MBE
- Peter Duffy MBE
- Gareth Hinge MBE
- Christine Carter BEM
- Harry Owens BEM

== Australia ==
The 2020 Queen's Birthday Honours for Australia were announced on 8 June 2020 by the Governor-General, David Hurley.

== New Zealand ==
The 2020 Queen's Birthday Honours for New Zealand were announced on 1 June 2020.

== See also ==
- Australian honours system
- New Zealand royal honours system
- Orders, decorations, and medals of the United Kingdom
- 2020 Canadian Honours List
