= Pushkala Gopal =

- Born: Chelmsford
- Occupation: Dance teacher, dancer
- Awards: Member of the Order of the British Empire

Pushkala Gopal MBE is a practitioner of the Bharatanatyam form of Indian classical dance, hailing from London.

== Recognition and awards ==
- Appointed a Member of the Order of the British Empire (MBE) in the 2020 Birthday Honours "For services to South Asian Dance"

== Personal life ==
Gopal was born in Chelmsford, England, the daughter of an army officer, and has lived in Delhi with her husband, an Indian Administrative Service officer.
