= United Kingdom and the International Monetary Fund =

The United Kingdom on a map

The United Kingdom joined the IMF on 27 December 1945, becoming one of the first 40 nations to join the global organisation. The intention of the IMF was to help rebuild the economies' of Europe following World War II and promote the missions of global cooperation and economic growth established at the Bretton Woods Conference. The UK currently holds 4.03 percent of the total votes for the IMF and a 20,155.1 (in million of SDRs) quota.

== Background ==
In a House of Lords debate on 23 May 1944, Lord Addison said:

"All I would say is that it is our duty to do everything we can to support those who are trying to bring about an international organization that will deal with these matters because it is essential to the future. We must have, too, if we can create it, an international monetary organization which will not only discourage national isolationism but will, on the contrary, encourage development throughout the world, devote itself to lifting up the standard of people everywhere, thereby providing the surest basis of all for regular employment, and at the same time helping to abate those discontents which in the long run, in times past, have done so much to undermine the foundations of peace."

Lord Keynes responded in the same debate:

"With our own resources so greatly impaired and encumbered, it is only if sterling is firmly placed in an international setting that the necessary confidence in it can be sustained. Indeed, even during the transitional period, it will be our policy, I hope, steadily to develop the field within which sterling is freely available as rapidly as we can manage.'

As part of the background in establishing the post-war order, the Britain signed the Anglo-American agreement. The New York Times covered it in December 1945:

"It seems clear that the alternative to granting this assistance to Great Britain is a return to the very economic warfare of the Thirties which thrived on bilateralism, on Government trade controls, on barter, multiple currencies, and discriminations of every kind. At these things the Nazis were masters, and to their kind of a world we would return. The reason that the alternative is so clear is because the British would have no real choice but to fight for restoration and survival by building their own closed-in trade which would be bitterly competitive with our own orbit and possibly with a third dominated by Soviet Russia. Such a trade world, in the opinion of our top economic authorities, could only lead to war."

The context behind the agreement was seen to be geopolitical in addition to financial as the history of government notes:

"In these first postwar months, hopes of continuing east-west cooperation were not dead but were fading, with each side blaming the other. If there were trouble ahead, Britain was on the side of the US, as their increasingly close intelligence relationship showed. The Financial Agreement tightened the bond."

== History ==
=== The 1976 Debt Crisis ===
Anthony Barber, a member of the Conservative Party in Britain, created a budget in 1972 in an attempt to have his party hold onto power in the 1974 election. This budget lead to a period of growth followed by a time that would result in high levels of inflation, almost 25%, for the pound sterling. In 1976 investors later became wary of the value of sterling causing the value of the pound to become very low against the United States dollar. This balance of payment issue coupled with citizens losing confidence in spending, would result in the UK borrowing 3.9 billion from the IMF. This was the largest loan from the IMF at the time, but only half of the loan would be taken out. The UK rebuilt their reserves and repaid the loan by 1979.

=== Present Day 2020 - 2023 ===
In 2023 the IMF had stated that it saw the UK's GDP contracting by 0.3% this coming year meaning that it would be the worst performing rich economy. In February 2023 the UK had an inflation rate of 10.4% which outweighed that of the European Union and United States. However, the IMF has declared that the UK is doing better and may no longer need IMF assistance. Their labour wages are lagging behind the inflation rate and could get worse in the future, but as for now they are on a trajectory towards growth.
