= Bank Job =

Bank Job may refer to:

- Bank robbery
- The Bank Job, a 2008 film
- The Bank Job (game show), a 2012 British television programme
- "The Bank Job" (Brooklyn Nine-Nine), a television episode
- Bank Job, a 2009 novel by James Heneghan
- Bank Job (book), a 2026 political memoir by former British prime minister Liz Truss
- "Bank Job", a song by Barenaked Ladies from Barenaked Ladies Are Me
