= Ten Years to Save the West =

2024 memoir by Liz Truss

- E-book cover
- Author: Liz Truss
- Language: English
- Genre: Memoir
- Publisher: Biteback Publishing (United Kingdom); Regnery Publishing (United States)
- Publication date: 16 April 2024
- Publication place: United Kingdom

Ten Years to Save the West is a memoir of the former British prime minister Liz Truss, published on 16 April 2024, by Biteback Publishing in the United Kingdom and Regnery Publishing in the United States. The UK edition is subtitled "Lessons from the Only Conservative in the Room". The US edition is subtitled "Leading the Revolution Against Globalism, Socialism, and the Liberal Establishment".

The book contains Truss's account of her meetings with various heads of state and government, including her meeting with Elizabeth II two days before the monarch's death, with Truss claiming to want to see a global "conservative movement revival". Truss wrote the book herself without the use of a ghostwriter. The book was announced by Truss on the social media platform X. She promoted it by speaking at the Heritage Foundation in Washington, D.C. and by giving television interviews.

== Summary ==
The book charts Truss's career through a succession of ministerial posts, including junior minister at the Department for Education; Secretary of State for Environment, Food and Rural Affairs; Lord Chancellor, Chief Secretary to the Treasury; Secretary of State for International Trade; Foreign Secretary; and finally her tenure as Prime Minister. Throughout the book, she identifies institutions and people that she blames for opposing the changes she wanted to make. These include what she calls the "anti-growth coalition" as well as the judiciary, the civil service, the "global left", and environmental and animal rights organisations. Truss complains of a "distinct shortage of expert voices" in support of her economic reforms.

Truss's Conservative party colleagues David Cameron, Michael Gove, and Rishi Sunak come in for criticism, as do "CINOs" (Conservatives In Name Only) who, in her view, supported her insufficiently. She also criticises foreign leaders including U.S. president Joe Biden, Canadian prime minister Justin Trudeau, and French president Emmanuel Macron. For the financial crisis that followed from her and Chancellor Kwasi Kwarteng's mini-budget, she blames the Office for Budget Responsibility, the Bank of England, and the Treasury.

In the section about her time as prime minister, Truss talks about the difficulties she had living at 10 Downing Street, saying that the role involves presidential responsibility but without the necessary support. She describes her reaction to the death of Queen Elizabeth II, which she summarises as "Why me? Why now?" The closing chapter of the book consists of "important lessons we can learn so we can win". She calls for "the leftist state" to be dismantled and for conservatism to triumph "across the free world". She proposes dismantling the United Nations, the World Trade Organisation and the World Health Organisation.

== Reception ==
The book received predominantly negative reviews. Critics, including those politically sympathetic to Truss (The Times and The Telegraph), described the book as detached from reality, self-serving, and revealing a lack of comprehension regarding the gravity of the situation during Truss's premiership.

Patrick Maguire in The Times criticised the book as tedious and muddled, raising interesting questions but offering confusing or contradictory answers to them. For British conservatives, Maguire said, the book is "worth enduring". The Independent awarded one out of five stars, calling the book "one giant whinge" that inverted the facts about Truss's career in order to portray her as having done nothing wrong. The Telegraph gave the book four out of five stars, contrasting it against the "snoozefest" memoirs of other politicians. The review agreed with Truss's assessment that left-wing values had been absorbed into the British establishment, but described the author herself as lacking in self-awareness.

David Gauke, a former Member of Parliament in the Conservative party, argued that the lessons to be learned from the book are not the ones that Truss herself draws. He interpreted the book as a story, not of powerful vested interests, but of a politician with "a simplistic mindset and a reckless temperament" who achieved little in her political offices. A similar assessment was given by Tom Peck in The Times, who said Truss "appears psychiatrically incapable" of learning from her own experiences.

Andrew Rawnsley, writing for The Guardian, described it as an "unintentionally hilarious" book characterised by intense self-pity combined with a lack of self-reflection. He said it only has appeal as a cautionary tale of zealotry. Stuart Jeffries, also from The Guardian, called the book "unstoppably self-serving" and "cliche-ridden", saying that its purpose, like that of many other political memoirs, is to rewrite history for the benefit of an author unable to accept responsibility. John Crace, in his satire "49 Days to Make a Mess", provided a digested version.

=== Controversies ===
According to the Cabinet Office, the book violated the Radcliffe rules, which limit what former ministers can publish in their memoirs. Truss shared a draft of the book with the Cabinet Office to be vetted, but the office did not give full approval for the final wording. In particular, the book disclosed conversations with the reigning monarch, which the rules prohibit. According to a spokesperson, Truss believed her breach of confidentiality was in the public interest.

The book included a fabricated quote attributed to Mayer Amschel Rothschild, the founder of the Rothschild banking family: "Permit me to issue and control the money of a nation, and I care not who makes its laws." No historical evidence supports this attribution, as the phrase originated in conspiracy literature long after his death. Truss discovered the quote online, which has long circulated as part of anti-semitic conspiracy theories. After a complaint from the Board of Deputies of British Jews, the publisher Biteback agreed to exclude it from future editions. Truss described herself as "horrified" to learn the quote's origin.
