= September 2022 United Kingdom mini-budget =

UK government budget

2022 United Kingdom mini-budget
- Presented: 23 September 2022
- Country: United Kingdom
- Parliament: 58th
- Party: Conservative Party
- Chancellor: Kwasi Kwarteng

On 23 September 2022, the Chancellor of the Exchequer, Kwasi Kwarteng, delivered a Ministerial Statement entitled "The Growth Plan" to the House of Commons. Widely referred to in the media as a mini-budget (it not being an official budget statement), it contained a set of economic policies and tax cuts such as bringing forward the planned 1% cut in the basic rate of income tax to 19%; abolishing the highest (45%) rate of income tax in England, Wales and Northern Ireland; reversing a plan announced in March 2021 to increase corporation tax from 19% to 25% from April 2023; reversing the April 2022 increase in National Insurance; and cancelling the proposed Health and Social Care Levy. Following widespread negative response to the mini-budget, the planned abolition of the 45% tax rate was reversed 10 days later, while plans to cancel the increase in corporation tax were reversed 21 days later.

The mini-budget was among the first measures of the Truss ministry, which had begun on 6 September. The statement was delivered against the backdrop of a cost-of-living crisis and was immediately followed by a sharp fall in the value of the pound sterling against the US dollar as world markets reacted negatively to the increased borrowing required. They also appeared to be concerned that no independent forecast by the Office for Budget Responsibility (OBR) had been published. By the next day of trading, the pound had hit an all-time low against the US dollar. The mini-budget drew widespread criticism from economists, some of whom feared that its reliance on increased government borrowing to pay for the largest tax cuts in 50 years could lead to a situation similar to the 1976 sterling crisis when the UK was forced to ask the International Monetary Fund (IMF) for a financial bailout. The IMF took the unusual step of issuing an openly critical response to the budget, saying it would "likely increase inequality". It urged the UK government to "re-evaluate" the proposed tax cuts. HM Treasury announced plans to outline in November how the proposals would be costed, this being later brought forward to 31 October, alongside an independent forecast from the OBR.

Despite continued market turbulence, and calls from Members of Parliament including members of the Conservative Party for a policy reversal, Prime Minister Liz Truss and Kwarteng maintained that the proposals outlined in the mini-budget would go ahead. Speculation began to mount about Truss's future as prime minister, and on 14 October she summoned Kwarteng back to the UK from a meeting of finance ministers in Washington, D.C., and asked for his resignation. Truss then appointed Jeremy Hunt to replace him. Hunt subsequently reversed the majority of the tax cuts that had been outlined in the mini-budget, a decision that led to a positive market reaction. Following Truss's resignation on 25 October, her successor Rishi Sunak retained Hunt as Chancellor. The 31 October statement was moved to 17 November in order to base it on the "most accurate possible" economic forecasts, and was also upgraded to a full autumn statement.

Initial reaction to the mini-budget was mixed, though the traditionally conservative newspapers generally viewed it positively. The Daily Mail called it a "true Tory budget", while Allister Heath in The Daily Telegraph described it as "the best Budget I have ever heard a British Chancellor deliver, by a massive margin". Conversely, Frances O'Grady, the General Secretary of the Trades Union Congress, branded it "Robin Hood in reverse". Faisal Islam, the BBC's economics editor, described the mini-budget's reversal as "the biggest U-turn in British economic history". William Keegan, the former economics editor of The Observer, wrote that the plans outlined in the statement had shown a misunderstanding of Thatcherism and its attitude towards taxation, in that Thatcher's initial cuts to direct taxes were balanced by increases in indirect taxes, such as VAT.

== Background ==
The mini-budget took place against the backdrop of a cost of living crisis with inflation at high levels, and energy costs in particular rising sharply. During the Conservative Party leadership election held between July and September 2022, Liz Truss advocated for an emergency budget implementing significant reductions in taxation and adoption of radical free market policies, as previously outlined in Britannia Unchained, a political thesis released in 2012, which was advocated by right-leaning think tanks, particularly those based at 55 Tufton Street. Despite criticism about the viability of such policies from her rival Rishi Sunak and political commentators, Truss won the leadership election and became Prime Minister in September 2022. Truss subsequently appointed Britannia Unchained co-author Kwasi Kwarteng as Chancellor of the Exchequer. On 15 September 2022, it was reported that Kwarteng was planning to announce an emergency budget on 23 September. At the time, Parliament was in recess following the death of Elizabeth II and government business was suspended until after the funeral. Her chief economic adviser was Matthew Sinclair.

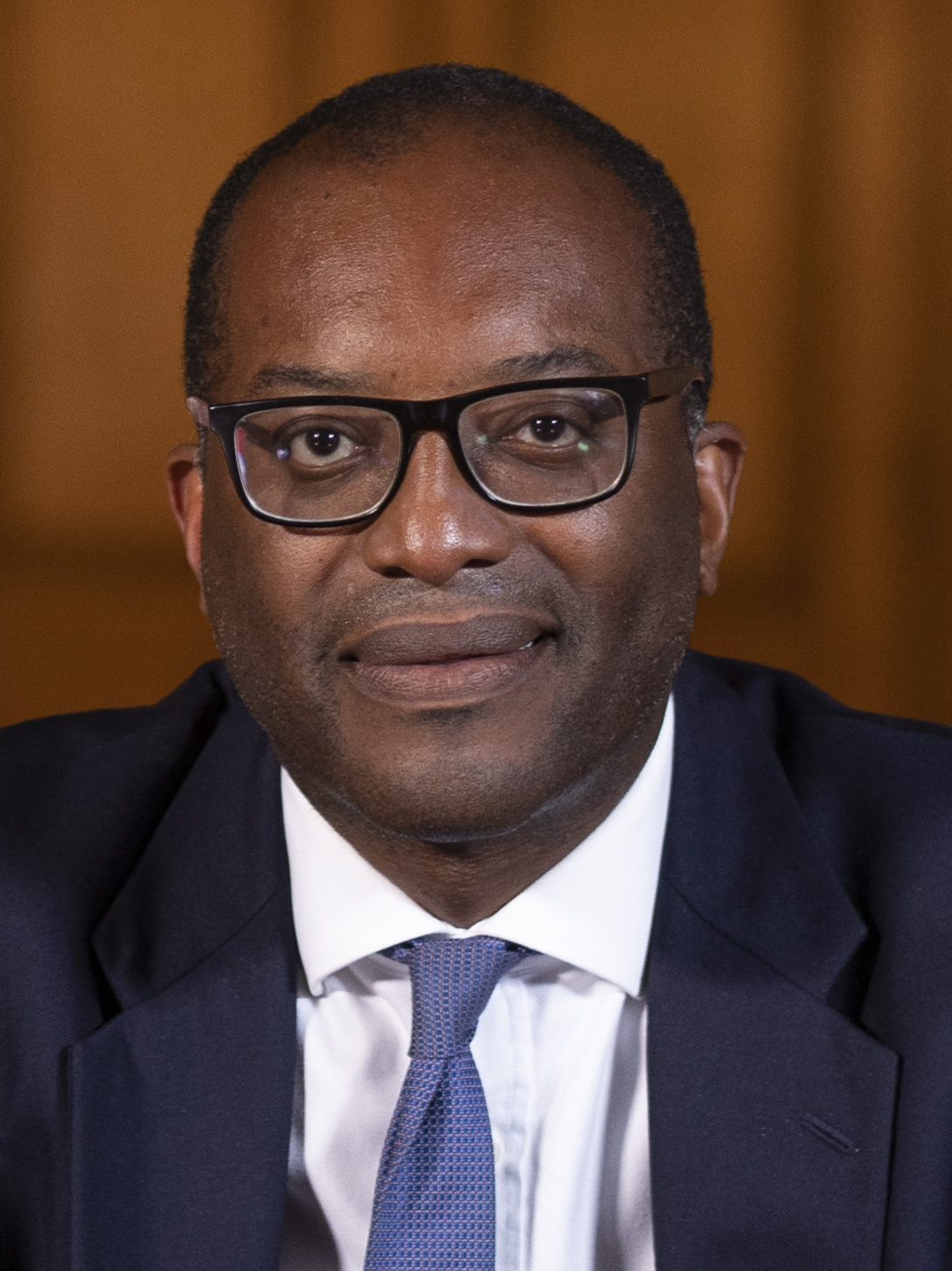
The mini budget was delivered in the House of Commons by Kwasi Kwarteng, the Chancellor of the Exchequer.

On 21 September, ahead of the budget, and having previously announced plans to cap the price of household energy bills for two years, the UK government announced a scheme that would freeze wholesale gas and electricity prices for businesses for six months from 1 October. This was followed the next day with the announcement that a 1.25% rise in National Insurance contributions that took effect from April 2022 would be reversed from 6 November. On the same day it was announced that plans to introduce the Health and Social Care Levy in April 2023 would be scrapped. The Bank of England also increased the UK interest rate by 1.75 to 2.25%, the biggest increase in 27 years, in an attempt to curb inflation. Ongoing concerns about a possible recession were impacted when the Bank of England also suggested the UK may already have entered recession.

Prior to the statement, the Office for Budget Responsibility, a body that provides independent analysis of public finance, offered to produce a forecast to accompany the mini-budget, but this was turned down by the government. Truss has claimed that the government did not have time to wait for the OBR's report, but the OBR has said it would have been ready to produce one in time for 23 September. It was subsequently reported that shortly after Truss took office, senior civil servants at the Treasury and the Cabinet Office advised her against introducing large tax cuts funded by borrowing without an independent growth forecast from the Office for Budget Responsibility, fearing it would be a high risk strategy and too much of a shock to the economy. Notably, the Permanent Secretary to the Treasury, Tom Scholar, was sacked by Truss upon her entering office, after six years in the role.

On the eve of the mini-budget and writing for The Guardian, the newspaper's economics editor, Larry Elliott noted its significance, observing that "most full-blown budgets matter little and are quickly forgotten" but that "this one is a very big deal indeed" as it would mark a change in the approach to the management of the UK economy, when previously the focus had been on balancing the government's books, something former Prime Minister Margaret Thatcher had likened to a housewife managing her household budget. The economic philosophy adopted by Truss and Kwarteng, that lower taxes would pay for themselves by encouraging economic growth, a theory known as supply-side economics and called by critics trickle-down economics, earned the name Trussonomics, and sought to "challenge Treasury orthodoxy" by running the economy differently. Following Truss' resignation and Rishi Sunak's appointment as Prime Minister, Kwarteng said in a November 2022 interview that he warned Truss that she was "going too fast" with her ill-fated economic plans.

On 12 December 2022, treasury officials told MPs Kwarteng neglected warnings the mini-budget could cause a backlash in financial markets. James Bowler, the Permanent Secretary to the Treasury, said he was "absolutely confident Treasury officials set out the right advice" to Kwarteng but could not persuade him to change things, saying "officials advise but ministers decide". Treasury civil servant Beth Russell told the Commons Treasury Select Committee she and another civil servant "are confident that we gave all the advice to ministers" over the economic and fiscal background, the consequences, the market situation specially over the financing needs, "which was a big issue because of the cost of the measures". Russell maintained officials gave the best advice but ministers take decisions.

== The budget ==
Major measures by cost over 5 years
	£ millions
National Insurance increase reversal	76,965
Corporation Tax cancel increase †	63,175
Energy bills support 2022–23	60,000^{[a]}
Cost of living support announced May 2022	15,350
Stamp Duty reduction	7,030
Income Tax remove 45% rate band †	6,790
IR35 easing ‡	6,190
Income Tax from 20% to 19% ‡	5,480
Annual Investment Allowance increase	5,315
VAT free shopping ‡	5,280
No clawback on previous energy support	4,780
Alcohol Duty freeze/reform ‡	2,520
Dividend Tax increase reversal ‡	2,420
Venture/Employee share schemes reform	280
† Measures rescinded by 14 October in light blue ‡ Measures rescinded by next chancellor in violet^{a} Domestic energy support ran to Sep 2024, but only first 6 months was costed

The mini-budget, also known as "The Growth Plan", was designed to boost economic growth through tax cuts, which would be paid for by increasing the United Kingdom national debt. The package, worth £161 billion over five years plus £60 billion for the 2022–2023 energy bills support package, would have represented the biggest tax cut in the UK since the 1972 "dash for growth" budget of Anthony Barber. The budget also set an annual growth target of 2.5%. The Guardian observed that in spite of the number of measures announced in the statement (which involved much greater amounts than in some budgets), HM Treasury had described the statement as a "fiscal event" because the Office for Budget Responsibility had not been asked to provide analysis of the measures announced.

The Resolution Foundation calculates that the mini-budget cost the UK Treasury £30bn, the Truss government caused roughly that amount of the fiscal hole which the Treasury claims is £60bn. The Resolution Foundation estimates that Truss and Kwasi Kwarteng lost £20bn through unfunded cuts to National Insurance and stamp duty, and another £10bn were lost through raised interest rates and government borrowing costs as the markets reacted to the budget.

=== Key points ===
The key points announced in the mini-budget are as follows:

- Cut in the basic rate of income tax to 19% from April 2023, instead of April 2024 as previously announced (withdrawn on 17 October)
- The 45% additional rate of income tax to be abolished for the highest earners in England, Wales and Northern Ireland from April 2023 (withdrawn on 3 October)
- From 6 November, reversal of the 1.25% rise in National Insurance introduced in April 2022
- Plans to introduce the Health and Social Care Levy from April 2023 scrapped
- Plan to scrap an increase of corporation tax from 19% to 25% in April 2023 (withdrawn on 14 October)
- Around 120,000 more people on Universal Credit to be asked to look for more work or face benefit sanctions
- People over 50 will be given more time with job coaches to help them find work
- Repeal of 2017 and 2021 reforms to IR35 anti-avoidance tax legislation governing off-payroll work (withdrawn on 17 October)
- Annual tax-free corporate investment allowance to remain at £1m indefinitely
- Regulations change to allow pension funds to increase UK investments
- Tax relief for investors, allowing new and start-up companies to raise up to £250,000 of investment
- Maximum share options for employees doubled from £30,000 to £60,000
- Stamp duty threshold lifted to £250,000 with immediate effect (£425,000 for first time buyers)
- A two-year freeze on energy bills that will cost an estimated £60bn over six months, and is forecast to reduce inflation by 5% (reduced to six months on 17 October)
- The limit on bankers' bonuses is scrapped
- Re-introduce VAT-free shopping for overseas visitors, extended to visitors from EU (withdrawn on 17 October)
- Scrapping of planned increases in the duties on beer, cider, wine and spirits
- Plans for investment zones in England, with 38 initially proposed
- Liberalising of planning laws and scrapping of EU planning regulations

The Chancellor also announced the closure of the Office of Tax Simplification, effective when the next Finance Bill received royal assent.

== Reaction ==
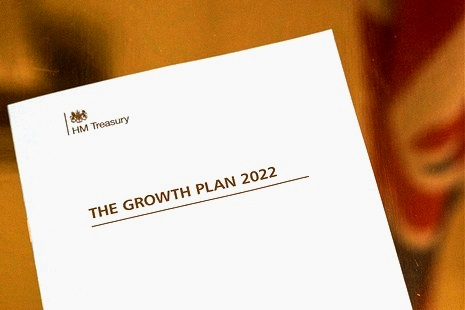
Cover of the "Growth Plan 2022", the main part of the mini-budget

=== Currency, interest rate, and debt ===
On 23 September, and following the mini-budget, the pound sterling fell sharply in response to the government's planned spending increases and tax cuts, losing 3% against the US dollar and dropping below $1.09. It also fell 0.75% against the euro. On 26 September, sterling reached an all-time low against the dollar, dropping to $1.0327, its lowest since Decimal Day in 1971. As a result, the probability of pound–dollar parity by the end of 2022, a situation when £1.00 is worth $1.00, increased to 60%. Following a slight recovery, it fell again on 28 September to $1.05. On 30 September, and after another slight recovery, the pound fell again, to $1.1082, following an emergency meeting between Truss, Kwarteng and the Office for Budget Responsibility, and when the Treasury resisted calls for the early publication of an OBR forecast. On 3 October, and following Kwarteng's announcement of a reversal of the plans to scrap the higher rate of income tax, the pound rose to pre-mini-budget levels, reaching $1.13, before dropping slightly to $1.12. The following day it rose to $1.14 after Kwarteng's announcement that an Office for Budget Responsibility report would be published "shortly". On 11 October the pound again fell, reaching a two-week low, after Andrew Bailey, the Governor of the Bank of England, confirmed the end of a scheme to buy government bonds, before settling at $1.10. On 13 October, the pound recovered after Sky News reported government discussions were taking place about possible changes to the fiscal plan, reaching a one week high of $1.12540. Stocks and bonds also recovered following the reports. By the next day it had reached $1.13 amid speculation of a possible reversal of the policy, but dropped to $1.12 again after a hastily arranged press conference at which Truss announced the reversal of plans to scrap the raise in corporation tax. The pound strengthened after Hunt reversed the majority of the planned tax cuts on 17 October, rising to $1.13, and ended the day at $1.14. Following Rishi Sunak's appointment as prime minister on 25 October, Sterling rose to $1.149, its highest level since mid-September.

On 26 September, and in a bid to calm the markets, the Treasury announced that Kwarteng would publish a medium term fiscal plan on 23 November and that the UK's fiscal watchdog, the Office for Budget Responsibility, would produce a forecast, both giving more details of how the measures would be costed. On the same day the Bank of England said it would "not hesitate" to raise interest rates and was "monitoring developments closely" but would not meet again to decide on interest rate levels until November. The following day the Bank's chief economist, Huw Pill, said it would have to deliver a "significant monetary policy response".

On 27 September, banks and building societies withdrew some mortgage products amid concerns about an increase in the interest rate. Virgin Money and the Skipton Building Society stopped mortgage offers for new customers, and the Bank of Ireland halted all new mortgage offers. Nationwide Building Society announced increases in its fixed rate mortgages by between 0.90% and 1.20% from the next day.

By 29 September, 40% of mortgage products had been withdrawn from the UK market. By 5 October, the interest rate on a typical two-year fixed-rate mortgage had risen above 6% for the first time since 2008. On 1 November, the Nationwide Building Society reported the turbulence caused by the mini-budget had led to a 0.9% fall in house prices during October, the first fall in UK house prices for 15 months, and the largest since June 2020 during the COVID-19 pandemic.

On 2 October, The Sunday Times reported that Kwarteng had attended a party on the evening of 23 September at which he had discussed aspects of economic policy with hedge fund managers, who might gain from a crash in the pound, and who had allegedly "egged him on". Conservative Party Chairman Jake Berry, who attended the same party, rejected claims such a conversation took place.

Speaking to the Treasury Committee on 18 October, Jon Cunliffe, a deputy governor of the Bank of England, told MPs that the Bank had not been warned about the contents of the mini-budget: "We did not have a full briefing of the package the night before. Had they asked us what the market reaction would be, we would have interacted with them." Appearing before the House of Lords Economic Affairs Committee on 29 November, Andrew Bailey, the Governor of the Bank of England, also described how the Bank had been unaware of the contents of the mini-budget, even though a member of the Treasury was present at a meeting of the Monetary Policy Committee the day before, telling Peers, "I don't think Treasury officials were clear what was going to be in [the mini-budget]".

=== Bond markets ===
Ian King of Sky News observed that the prospect of a large surge in government borrowing caused a sharp rise in the bond market, where yields on gilt-edged securities immediately rose significantly. Borrowing costs on five-year government bonds experienced their largest increase in a single day on record as traders sold off UK assets. The Treasury announced it would ask the Debt Management Office to raise an additional £72bn in gilt sales in 2022. King described Kwarteng's strategy as "high-risk, high-reward" and "unashamedly seeking to pursue growth" but said that the bond market was concerned about "this amount of fiscal loosening at a time when there is monetary tightening being carried out by the Bank of England".

In response to this bond market volatility, the Bank of England (BoE) announced on 28 September that it would begin to buy UK government bonds on a temporary basis for the following two weeks to calm the market, doing so because certain types of pension funds were at risk of collapse, with Sir Jon Cunliffe, the Bank's Deputy Governor, later describing some as being a matter of hours from being wound up. The Financial Times reported that many pension funds were using liability-driven investment derivatives to manage the risk of future interest rate changes, and this forced the funds to provide cash as additional collateral when gilt prices fell sharply. In turn, this led to forced selling, depressing bond prices further before the BoE intervened.

The bank planned to buy £5bn of gilts per day with a maturity of at least 20 years, and by 10 October had offered to buy £40bn worth of bonds, though it had actually bought £5bn worth. Kwarteng's 10 October announcement that he intended to bring forward the date on which he would set out his spending plan from 23 November to 31 October caused further volatility in bond markets. Also on 10 October, the Bank of England announced new measures aimed at ensuring an "orderly end" to its scheme of emergency bond purchases, due to end on 14 October. The measures included doubling the amount of bonds it could buy from £5bn a day to £10bn a day in the scheme's final week, and putting in place extra support to ease future pressure on pensions. According to the Pensions and Lifetime Savings Association, many of its member funds called for the bond-buying program to be extended until Kwarteng's new spending plan was released on 31 October. But as the bank stepped in to buy more bonds on 11 October, Governor Andrew Bailey reiterated that the scheme would end as planned. The bank also warned of a "material risk" to financial stability as markets continued to experience turmoil.

The cost of government borrowing across several bonds rose on 14 October after Kwarteng was sacked as Chancellor and Truss announced a reversal of plans to cut corporation tax. Interest on government bonds fell on 17 October as Chancellor Jeremy Hunt announced a reversal of the majority of the tax cuts outlined in the mini-budget, but it remained higher than when Truss took office. Following Sunak's appointment as prime minister on 25 October, gilt yields returned to pre-mini-budget levels, with 30-year gilt yields falling to 3.68%.

The government bonds, bought for £19.3 billion, were sold over the following sixteen months for £23.1 billion, yielding a net profit of £3.8bn, which was transferred to HM Treasury.

=== International response ===
On 27 September, the International Monetary Fund (IMF) took the unusual step of issuing a statement in which it openly criticised the plans, saying "the nature of the UK measures will likely increase inequality". The IMF, which acts to stabilise the global economy and sound economic warnings, suggested the government's fiscal plan, due at the time to be published on 23 November, gave it an opportunity to "re-evaluate" tax measures, "especially those that benefit high income earners".

On 28 September the global credit ratings agency Moody's described the plans as being "credit negative" and warned they "could more permanently weaken the UK's debt affordability". Moody's subsequently lowered the UK's economic outlook to "negative", doing so on 21 October, and amid what it described as "risks to the UK's debt affordability". as well as "heightened unpredictability in policymaking amid weaker growth prospects and high inflation" and "risks to the UK's debt affordability from likely higher borrowing and risk of a sustained weakening in policy credibility".

On 16 October, U.S. president Joe Biden said: "I wasn't the only one that thought it was a mistake. I think that the idea of cutting taxes on the super-wealthy when ... I disagree with the policy, but it's up to Britain to make that judgment, not me." Other world leaders and world media also criticised the mini-budget and Truss's economic policy. In late September, the French Minister of Economy Bruno Le Maire noted that the quick rise in interest rates on UK bonds was all the more important that the country's exit from the European Union had made it lose financial credibility on the markets.

=== Business and economic ===
The statement was broadly welcomed by business groups, including right-wing think tanks such as the Adam Smith Institute, the Centre for Policy Studies, and the Institute of Economic Affairs, but economists questioned whether the plans were affordable. Mark Littlewood, director-general of the Institute of Economic Affairs, hailed it as a "boost-up budget" and said it was "refreshing to hear a chancellor talk passionately about the importance of economic growth". Tony Danker, Director of the Confederation of British Industry welcomed the reforms to planning and infrastructure: "Today is day one of a new UK growth approach. We must now use this opportunity to make it count and bring growth to every corner of the UK." Kitty Ussher, chief economist of the Institute of Directors, also welcomed the budget, describing it as "a good news day for British business". Lisa Hooker, consumer markets lead at PricewaterhouseCoopers, felt the tax reductions "should help the consumer longer term" while "short-term energy cost support is important". There were some concerns among the business community. Steven Alton, CEO of the British Institute of Innkeeping, said the statement did not address "the vulnerability of our small pub businesses in every community", while Stephen Phipson, CEO of Make UK, welcomed the statement for including a number of "positive measures" but warned it was the sixth growth strategy in a decade, saying this had resulted in "zero certainty" for businesses.

Paul Johnson, director of the Institute for Fiscal Studies, described the plans announced in the statement as a "big gamble", with money being injected into the economy while inflation remains high. A commentary piece in The Guardian described the statement as "a naked exercise in redistributing wealth upwards" and commented that "it is more or less impossible to find an economist who supports the government's approach, or an economic model able to justify it". David Page, head of macro research at Axa Investment Management, described the statement as "clearly something that suggests a significant amount of extra gilt borrowing, but at the same time, it's fiscal stimulus during a period when the Bank of England is already worried about aggregate demand being too high, and it's highly likely to force the Bank of England to raise rates even more than we thought they were going to otherwise". George Saravelos, global head of foreign exchange research at Deutsche Bank AG warned the UK's currency was "in danger" and suggested markets were treating it like a developing economy. Former United States Secretary of the Treasury, Lawrence Summers, described the UK as behaving like an "emerging market turning into a submerging market", a view echoed by Nouriel Roubini, who was one of the economists who predicted a financial crisis, who warned that UK investments were trading "like an emerging market" and drew comparisons with the events that led to the 1976 sterling crisis when the UK was forced to ask the International Monetary Fund for a financial bailout. Samuel Tombs of research firm Pantheon Economics suggested the fall in the value of the pound could increase the cost of living by 0.5% in 2023. Two economists who did voice their support for the measures were Patrick Minford, a former economic adviser to Margaret Thatcher who Truss had cited as her inspiration, and Gerard Lyons, Truss's external economics adviser. Minford argued it had already resulted in stable inflation, moderate interest rates and higher growth, and suggested Truss and Kwarteng "could have banged the drum harder" in its defence, while in an article for the Sunday Express published on 25 September, Lyons said "While all governments want higher growth, few take the actions needed to achieve this. Truss is different." However, Minford later said that he believed the Office for Budget Responsibility should have been involved in the mini-budget in order to reassure the markets, while Lyons subsequently said he had been "very clear" about warning both Truss and Kwarteng of the potential impact of their plans.

The Institute for Fiscal Studies said the Chancellor was "betting the house" by putting government debt on an "unsustainable rising path". Kwarteng rejected suggestions he was gambling with the economy, and suggested the economic policy pursued by the Second Johnson ministry was more of a gamble, saying: "What was a gamble, in my view, was sticking to the course we are on. So what we had to do was have a reboot, a rethink." Danny Blanchflower, who sat on the Bank of England's Monetary Policy Committee for three years, questioned the credibility of both Truss and Kwarteng, describing their actions as "raging incompetence". Charlie Bean, a former member of the Office for Budget Responsibility and Bank of England deputy governor, suggested the government's three-year plan to reduce debt as a percentage of GDP would lead to a shortfall of £60bn to £70bn. The £60bn figure was also cited by the IFS, which suggested government borrowing would reach £100bn by 2026, when it had previously been forecast to be around £30bn, and that a solution to this high figure would be to implement cuts in government spending. But Truss maintained the policies can be introduced without spending cuts. The IMF said the plans outlined in the mini-budget would increase growth in the short term, but "complicate the fight" against rising prices.

Writing after Truss had announced her resignation as Prime Minister, William Keegan, a former Economics Editor of The Observer, suggested that Truss's plans were based in part on "a misunderstanding of Thatcherism and its attitude to taxation". He highlighted the 1979 budget, delivered at the start of Thatcher's premiership by Chancellor Geoffrey Howe, which had introduced substantial tax cuts, reducing the top rate of tax from 83% to 60% and the basic rate from 33% to 30%, but offset them with an increase in VAT from 8% to 15%. "The shock and horror that greeted Truss and co was not just that they planned unfunded tax cuts but that they were borrowing to finance them, and the proceeds were going to those who least needed them. After a decade of austerity, this was the last straw, offending even the prospective beneficiaries."

=== Media ===
The mini-budget initially won broad favour in the right-leaning media, while other outlets were less approving. On 24 September, the Daily Mail's front page ran with the headline "At last! A true Tory budget", and went on to quote the Confederation of British Industry which claimed there was "no choice but to go for growth". The Daily Express declared it to be an "extraordinary package of measures" and said that Kwarteng would never apologise for "having the courage to bet big" on Britain. The budget, it said, would put Britain "back on top". In contrast, the i newspaper said that the fall in sterling was a "punishing early verdict" from the markets, and warned of a Conservative backlash, while The Independent quoted Frances O'Grady, the General Secretary of the Trades Union Congress, who branded it "Robin Hood in reverse". The Guardian described it as a "budget for the rich".

Allister Heath, editor of The Sunday Telegraph wrote that it was "the best budget I have ever heard a British chancellor deliver". Of its content he said, "The tax cuts were so huge and bold, the language so extraordinary, that at times I had to pinch myself to make sure I wasn't dreaming, that I hadn't been transported to a distant land that actually believed in the economics of Milton Friedman and FA Hayek". He went on to predict "a new big bang in the City" and "dozens of new Canary Wharfs on steroids". He subsequently described the negative market reaction as "dispiriting", and argued that the problem was "one of presentation and context". Alex Brummer, City editor at the Daily Mail, called it "seismic" and said "By taking a hatchet to taxes and placing growth front and centre of economic policy, the chancellor has produced a genuine Tory package elbowing to one side the Treasury's fiscal conservatism". But Martin Wolf of the Financial Times thought it would "do nigh on nothing to raise medium-term growth, but risks serious macroeconomic instability". He was also critical of the government's decision to not ask the Office for Budget Responsibility to assess its impact, describing it as "simply scandalous", and suggesting "This government may be indifferent to painful reality. But reality usually wins in the end."

=== Political ===
Members of the Labour Party described the statement as "casino economics" and suggested it was a budget that would be of greater benefit to the wealthy than those on moderate incomes. Labour and some Conservative Party members of Parliament (MPs) also suggested it was wrong to cut taxes. Labour's deputy leader, Angela Rayner, suggested the budget would benefit the top 1% of earners. At the 2022 Labour Party Conference, leader Keir Starmer said Labour would reverse the cut to the top rate of income tax if the party were to win the 2024 general election. The crisis unfolded during the party conference season when Parliament is traditionally in recess, and there were calls from both Labour and the Liberal Democrats for Parliament to be recalled. At his party's annual conference, Ian Blackford, the Scottish National Party's leader at Westminster, described Truss and Kwarteng as having made "the worst first impression in the history of British politics" with a budget that "will go down as one of the worst financial interventions in modern history". Scotland's first minister, Nicola Sturgeon, hinted that she was unlikely to match income tax cuts for the highest earners in Scotland, describing the mini-budget as "reckless". Wales's finance minister, Rebecca Evans, said the Welsh Government would keep the 45p top tax rate for those earning over £150,000 if it were possible for them to do so.

Speaking two days after making his statement to the House of Commons, Kwarteng dismissed claims the budget would be more beneficial to the wealthy and said he planned to make further tax cuts: "We've actually put more money into people's pockets. We're bringing forward the cut in the basic rate [of income tax] and there's more to come. I want to see over the next year, people retain more of their income, because I believe it's the British people that are going to drive this economy." Kenneth Clarke, himself a former Conservative Chancellor, said the strategy risked increasing inflation without helping economic growth, rejecting the idea "that you make tax cuts for the wealthiest 5%, and it makes them work so much harder, and rush to invest, and it pays for itself or even attracts investment into the country". Kit Malthouse, appointed Education Secretary in Truss's government, said he was surprised by the market reaction to the mini-budget, as Truss had "advertised" a change in policy in advance. At the annual Conservative Party Conference in Birmingham, party member Michael Gove described the plans as deeply concerning and "not conservative".

On 26 September, BBC News reported that a number of Conservative MPs were concerned the reaction to the budget statement could damage the party's economic reputation. Sky News quoted an unnamed Conservative MP and former minister who suggested letters of no confidence in Truss were being sent to the chair of the Conservative Party's 1922 Committee in an attempt to trigger another leadership election. The Independent quoted an unnamed Conservative MP who suggested she could be replaced by Christmas if she did not reverse the plans. The journalist and broadcaster Andrew Marr thought another leadership election so soon would be unlikely. Writing for The Sunday Times after Kwarteng's dismissal, senior Conservative MP and chair of the House of Commons Education Select Committee Robert Halfon described the party as behaving like "libertarian jihadists" and urged them to reconnect with the blue collar conservatives who voted for them. He also demanded a "dramatic reset" on policy.

Politicians who spoke in favour of the mini-budget included Nigel Farage, the former leader of the UK Independence Party, who was one of the first to signal their approval, describing the statement as "the best Conservative budget since 1986", when the Thatcher Government had cut income tax from 30% to 29%. It was also welcomed by Sammy Wilson, an MP for the Democratic Unionist Party, who said in a statement, "The commitment to allow people retain more of their money is welcome and will help the economy grow", and claimed it would "increase living standards, boost employment and raise revenue for public services".

Some reports suggested that "multiple" Conservative MPs were prepared to vote against elements of the mini-budget. Michael Gove, a senior MP, described the removal of the top 45% rate as "a display of the wrong values". In response, party chairman Jake Berry suggested that MPs who voted against the mini-budget would lose the party whip. Following the government's reversal of plans to abolish the top tax rate, former cabinet member Grant Shapps said that the policy "didn't make sense", while Home Secretary Suella Braverman accused Conservative MPs of staging a "coup" against the government.

According to a retrospective article by Edward Malnick of The Telegraph, the mini-budget's failure came down to the lack of experience among the people Truss had appointed to her team, and poor communication of its objectives, notably the language she and Kwarteng used to promote it. Malnick quotes an unnamed senior minister who said that phrases such as "supply-side reforms" and "growth" did not make an impact with the public as many people would not understand the terms, and no attempt was made to explain it in a way that could be understood: "Instead of references to 'growth', the Government should have been telling voters that they wanted to make their children richer than them".

=== Opinion polling ===
View source data.
Results of opinion polling carried out in Great Britain of voting intention for the governing Conservatives and official opposition Labour, over the period between 1 September 2022 and 16 October 2022. Each dot represents the party's vote share in a single opinion poll.

A YouGov opinion poll put the Conservative Party 17% behind the Labour Party, the biggest Labour lead since 2001, which The Times attributed to "voters turning against Kwasi Kwarteng's tax-cutting budget" with just 19% of those polled considering the mini-budget to be "fair". A further YouGov opinion poll carried out on 28–29 September showed an increased Labour lead of 33% over the Conservative Party, the largest party lead since the late 1990s. The poll gave Labour 54 points to the Conservatives' 21. At the 2022 Conservative Party Conference political pollster John Curtice told delegates Labour were "very clearly the favourites" to win the next election, even if their lead in the polls were to be reduced, with Truss as unpopular with voters as her predecessor, Boris Johnson, had been prior to his resignation. Following Truss's first Conservative Party Conference as leader, an opinion poll for The Observer, published on 8 October, gave her an approval rating of −47, their worst ever rating for a sitting prime minister. An opinion poll published by PeoplePolling on 14 October gave the Conservatives 19 points against 53 for Labour, with those having a favourable view of Truss at 9%. A poll published by Opinium Research on 16 October calculated the number of House of Commons seats each party would win at a general election, giving Labour 411 seats and the Conservatives 137, a loss for the Conservatives of 219 seats, and creating a landslide win for Labour similar to that of the 1997 general election.

== Government response ==
=== Initial responses ===
On 28 September, the Treasury rejected calls to abandon the plans outlined in the mini-budget. BBC News reported that Chris Philp, Chief Secretary to the Treasury, would write to government departments asking them to find spending efficiencies.

On 29 September, and making her first public appearance since the mini-budget, Truss gave a series of interviews to BBC Local Radio stations in which she sought to defend the policy by saying her government had "done the right thing by taking action urgently" and that the Treasury was "working closely" with the Bank of England. She attributed the "biggest part" of the government's intervention to the energy bills cap, and stated that the problem was not solely a UK one and there were "difficult markets around the world" due to the 2022 Russian invasion of Ukraine. She also spoke of being prepared to make "controversial and difficult" decisions. Later the same day, Kwarteng told MPs that the mini-budget was needed to prevent a collapse in consumer spending, and that the government had protected the economy.

On 30 September, Truss and Kwarteng held a 48-minute emergency meeting with the Office for Budget Responsibility at 11 Downing Street, after which the OBR said it would deliver an initial forecast on 7 October. The government later announced the OBR forecast would be published on 23 November, along with the rest of its economic plans. Some Conservative MPs, including Mel Stride, the chair of the Treasury Select Committee, had called for the report to be published earlier, but Truss said she was "committed" to a publication date of 23 November.

Writing in the 1 October edition of The Sun, Truss conceded the mini-budget had caused "disruption", but said the government had "acted decisively" to help people with the cost of living. Appearing on the 2 October edition of BBC One's Sunday with Laura Kuenssberg, Truss conceded that her government should have done more to "lay the ground" for their economic plans, but said they would continue with the plans. The following day, Kwarteng announced a reversal of the plans to abolish the 45% tax rate, saying that the issue had become "a massive distraction on what was a strong package". He also announced that the government would publish a new fiscal statement as well as the independent OBR's forecast earlier than the originally planned 23 November date; this was later confirmed to be 31 October. Truss used her Twitter account to reiterate the reversal, saying "We get it and we have listened". On 4 October, while speaking to Chris Mason, the BBC's political editor, Truss said she was still in favour of lowering taxes for the most wealthy, but that it was something she was not currently contemplating, and that her priority was to "get through the winter". At her first party conference speech as leader, delivered on 5 October, Truss said she would break Britain out of a "high-tax, low-growth cycle" and attacked what she described as an "anti-growth coalition" she believed was holding the UK back from realising its full potential.

On 4 October, Kwarteng suggested to GB News that the mini-budget had been delivered in the "high pressure" aftermath of the Queen's death, while also stating on two separate occasions that the abolition of the highest tax rate had only been "postponed". While apologising for the chaos caused by the mini-budget, former Chancellor Nadhim Zahawi attracted derision after telling an edition of BBC One's Question Time that Russian President Vladimir Putin was to blame for the market turmoil.

Kwarteng received the Office for Budget Responsibility's forecast on 7 October. On 10 October he brought forward the date of his "medium-term fiscal plan" from 23 November to 31 October. It was confirmed the OBR report would also be published on the same day.

At the 12 October session of Prime Minister's Questions, Truss was asked about her leadership election pledge not to make cuts in public spending, and told the House of Commons, "What we will make sure is that over the medium term the debt is falling, but we will do that not by cutting public spending but by making sure we spend public money well". At a meeting of the Conservative Party's 1922 Committee in Westminster that evening she is reported to have been repeatedly warned by several of her MPs that her policies were causing both economic and political damage.

=== Dismissal of Chancellor ===
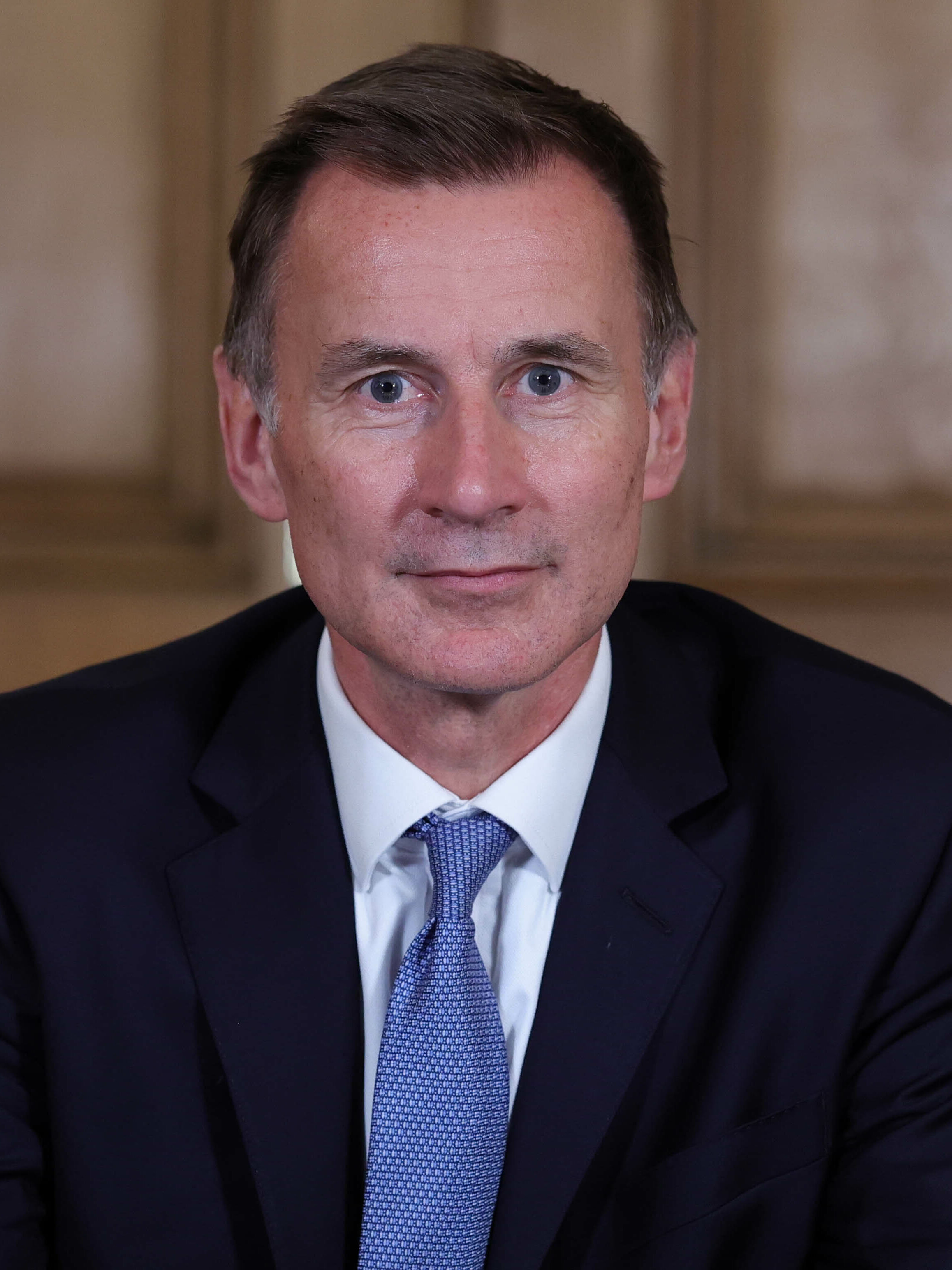
Jeremy Hunt replaced Kwarteng as chancellor on 14 October, and reversed the majority of the tax cuts that had been outlined in the mini-budget

Speculation about the future of both Truss and Kwarteng continued, with Channel 4 News's Gary Gibbon noting that an increasing number of Truss's colleagues "now see her as doomed". On 13 October, Sky News reported that discussions were underway in Downing Street about reversing some of the measures announced in the mini-budget. On 14 October, Truss dismissed Kwarteng as Chancellor of the Exchequer after a tenure of 38 days, having summoned him back to the UK from a meeting of finance ministers in Washington in order to fire him. She then replaced him with Jeremy Hunt. Chris Philp was also replaced by Edward Argar as Chief Secretary to the Treasury. At a press conference held in Downing Street later the same day, Truss announced plans to keep the previous government's increase in corporation tax, having conceded "it is clear that parts of our mini-budget went further and faster than markets were expecting". She also stated that government spending would "grow less rapidly than previously planned". But her actions failed to quell questions about her credibility. Andrew Bridgen, the Conservative MP for North West Leicestershire, suggested she could face a leadership challenge within weeks and that removing Kwarteng "when he implemented the policies she asked him to do won't engender loyalty to her", while BBC News quoted an unnamed MP who described her press conference as a "mega-disaster" and said she was "worse than Corbyn". Sean O'Grady of The Independent, suggested Hunt's appointment had effectively made him a de facto prime minister, a view echoed by the newspaper's chief political editor, John Rentoul. But Hunt insisted that Truss was still in charge of her government. The BBC economics editor, Faisal Islam, wrote that with Hunt's appointment, the economic philosophy of Trussonomics was dead. Edward Malnick of The Telegraph also seemed doubt over its future prospects: "Supporters of her free market vision fear it has now been killed off for a generation".

The day after Truss's announcement, US President Joe Biden took the unusual step of criticising the UK's domestic policy by describing her tax cut plans as a "mistake", and expressed concern the fiscal policies of other countries could affect the US economy amid "worldwide inflation".

Speaking on BBC Radio 4's Today programme the day after his appointment as Chancellor, Hunt conceded that mistakes had been made with the mini-budget, chiefly that Kwarteng had been wrong to cut the top tax rate, and that it had been an error to "fly blind" by not seeking the Office for Budget Responsibility's input. He also said that difficult times lay ahead and that some taxes would have to be increased. Following that appearance, the BBC's Laura Kuenssberg wrote that Hunt had "in a little over 24 hours junked [Truss's] economic strategy of tax cuts and a promise not to cut public spending". The following day Hunt held a three-hour meeting with Truss at Chequers, after which the two were described as being in "violent agreement" about reversing the majority of the tax cuts that had been outlined in the Growth Plan.

=== Reversal of tax cuts ===
On 17 October, Hunt brought forward the planned emergency statement, announcing the reversal of the majority of Kwarteng's tax cuts in a televised statement, arguing that "at a time when markets are rightly demanding commitment to sustainable public finances, it is not right to borrow to fund this tax cut". The measures announced by Hunt would lead to an annual saving of £32bn. The only tax cuts from the mini-budget to remain were the cuts to national insurance contributions and the raising of the stamp duty threshold. Plans to scrap the Health and Social Care Levy would also go ahead because the legislation relating to that was already going through Parliament. Hunt also confirmed the two-year energy price cap would be reduced to six months, and that the government would launch a Treasury-led review into finding an alternative way to help with energy costs that would be less of a financial strain on government. Finally he warned there would be cuts to public spending in the Medium-Term Fiscal Plan on 31 October. Hunt subsequently outlined the changes in a statement to the House of Commons, telling MPs the government would take "eye-watering" decisions to restore trust and confidence in the UK's finances. Responding to the announcement, Shadow Chancellor Rachel Reeves said "An arsonist is still an arsonist, even if he runs back into a burning building with a bucket of water". Faisal Islam described the announcement as "the biggest U-turn in British economic history".

== Resignation of Truss as Prime Minister ==
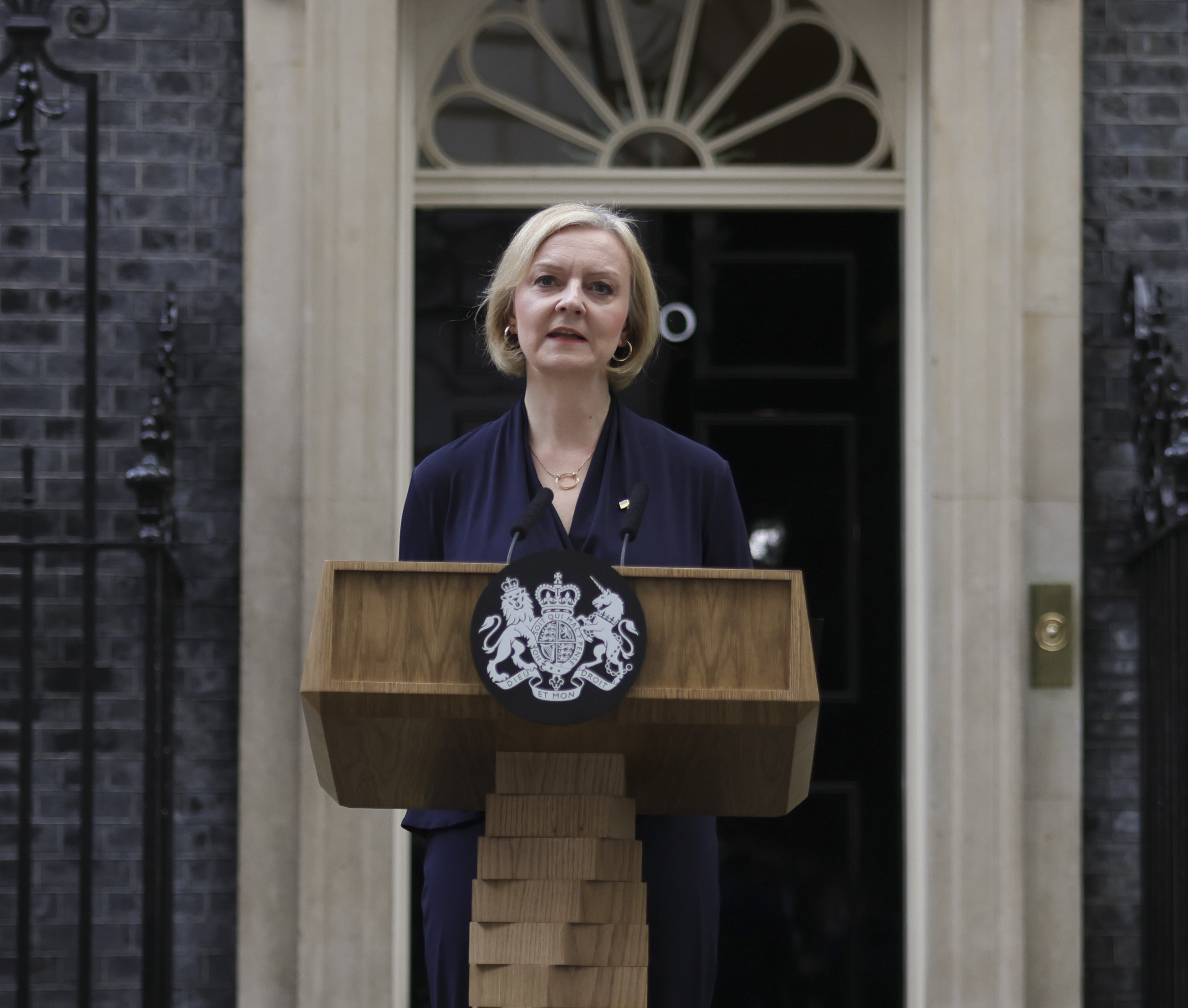
Liz Truss announcing her resignation on 20 October 2022

A number of Conservative MPs publicly called for Truss's resignation, citing the loss in public confidence in the government's policies. According to the Daily Telegraph, by 17 October these MPs included Crispin Blunt, Andrew Bridgen, Angela Richardson, Charles Walker and Jamie Wallis. Around that time, bookmakers were taking odds for the date of her resignation.

Conservative Party rules prohibit a challenge to the current incumbent for 12 months after a leadership contest. In the absence of a voluntary resignation by Truss, the other routes to forcing her exit from power included changing the party's rules or forcing a general election. In response to this, the Labour Party started an advertising campaign advocating a general election, with a focus on criticism of Truss's record in government. An opinion poll published by Redfield and Wilton Strategies on 17 October showed a 36-point lead for Labour, which if reflected in general election results could give the Conservatives as few as 22 seats in Parliament, resulting in them losing their power as a political force. The Electoral Calculus website suggested their number of seats could be as small as one. A YouGov poll published the next day gave Truss a personal rating of –70.

House of Commons Speaker Lindsay Hoyle granted opposition Labour leader Keir Starmer an urgent question for Truss on the afternoon of 17 October, but Downing Street confirmed that Leader of the House Penny Mordaunt would answer for her instead. Her absence drew criticism from a number of MPs, including Starmer, although she later made a brief appearance in the House, and it was subsequently reported she had been attending a pre-arranged meeting with Graham Brady, the chair of the 1922 Committee. In an interview with the BBC's political editor Chris Mason that evening, Truss said she was "sorry for the mistakes that have been made" but remained "committed to the vision". She also said she would lead the Conservatives into the next general election.

A YouGov survey of Conservative Party members published on 18 October had reported that a majority of them wanted Truss to resign, with their favoured front runners for her replacement being Boris Johnson as most popular, followed in order by Ben Wallace, Rishi Sunak, Penny Mordaunt, Kemi Badenoch, Jeremy Hunt and Suella Braverman. Bookmakers placed Sunak first in their list of likely Conservative prime ministerial successors, followed in order by Hunt, Mordaunt, Wallace and Johnson. Starmer, Nicola Sturgeon and numerous voters called for a general election. Calls were intensified following Truss' resignation.

On 19 October, during Prime Minister's Questions, Truss addressed Parliament for the first time since the tax cut reversal; when Starmer asked why Truss should continue to lead the country, Truss responded: "I am a fighter and not a quitter. I have acted in the national interest to make sure that we have economic stability." On the same day, Braverman resigned as Home Secretary after a breach of security when she sent an official document using a personal email account, and used her resignation letter to criticise the Truss government's change of policy: "I have concerns about the direction of this government. Not only have we broken key pledges that were promised to our voters, but I have had serious concerns about this Government's commitment to honouring manifesto commitments, such as reducing overall migration numbers and stopping illegal migration, particularly the dangerous small boats crossings." Grant Shapps was appointed to replace her. This was followed by reports that Conservative MPs had been "manhandled" into voting with the government during a parliamentary vote on banning fracking in the UK, uncertainty about whether or not the vote was a vote of confidence, and reports that Chief Whip, Wendy Morton, and her deputy, Craig Whittaker, had resigned, a claim rejected by Downing Street.

Brady held talks with Truss on 20 October, and she announced her resignation shortly afterwards, saying: "We set out a vision for a low-tax, high-growth economy that would take advantage of the freedoms of Brexit. I recognize though, given the situation, I cannot deliver the mandate on which I was elected by the Conservative Party. I have therefore spoken to His Majesty the King to announce that I am resigning as leader of the Conservative Party." She went on to confirm an election to choose her successor would be held within the following week. Rishi Sunak won the October 2022 Conservative Party leadership election unopposed, and he became prime minister on 25 October. In his first speech as prime minister, Sunak warned that "difficult decisions" lay ahead as he sought to deal with what he described as a "profound economic crisis" but said he would fix the mistakes made by his predecessor. Truss's resignation, announced 45 days into her term in office, and her departure 49 days after her appointment made her the shortest serving UK prime minister.

== Subsequent events ==
=== Following Truss's resignation ===
Hunt was retained as Chancellor in Sunak's cabinet. On 26 October, he deferred the date of the medium term fiscal statement from 31 October to 17 November, doing so to ensure it was based on the "most accurate possible" economic forecasts. He also confirmed it would be "upgraded" to a full autumn statement. Michael Gove later wrote that the Conservative Party had "made the wrong choice" by voting for Truss and that plans to cut taxes for the wealthy had been "a holiday from reality". In his first media interview since losing his job as Chancellor, Kwarteng told TalkTV he had warned Truss her economic reforms were moving too fast but she had not heeded that advice: "She said, 'Well, I've only got two years' and I said, 'You will have two months if you carry on like this'. And that is, I'm afraid, what happened."

=== Later events ===
Speaking to BBC News in March 2023, Truss said that she could have communicated her plan more effectively, but had been trying to deal with serious issues: "I didn't do everything perfectly and I fully acknowledge that, but I think I tried to deal with the real issues we were facing." But in a February 2024 address to the Conservative Political Action Conference in the United States, she blamed what she described as "antagonism" from the establishment for her downfall.

On 24 March 2023, the eight BBC Local Radio journalists who interviewed Truss during her premiership were awarded the prestigious BPG Jury Prize at the 2023 Broadcasting Press Guild Awards. BPG chair Grant Tucker described the interviews as "game-changing for Liz Truss and her doomed government".

On 24 October 2023, the Financial Conduct Authority confirmed that the cap on bankers' bonuses, introduced in 2014, would be lifted from 31 October as part of post-Brexit financial reforms, making it one of the few announcements from the mini-budget to survive. On 31 January 2024, Shadow Chancellor Rachel Reeves confirmed that Labour would not reintroduce the cap if they formed a government after the next general election. At the election, held on 4 July 2024, the Conservatives were heavily defeated by Labour, losing over 250 seats, including several held by prominent Conservatives and cabinet ministers, such as Mordaunt, Shapps and Jacob Rees-Mogg. Truss also lost her South West Norfolk seat to Labour. The Conservatives were left with 121 seats, giving the party their worst result in their parliamentary history.

As the party of opposition, the Conservatives sought to distance themselves from the mini-budget. In a speech given in June 2025, Shadow Chancellor Mel Stride said the Conservatives would "never again" put the UK's economic stability at risk by making "promises we cannot afford".

On 13 August 2025, data published by Moneyfacts showed the average two-year mortgage rate at 4.99%, the first time it had fallen below 5% since the mini-budget.

In September 2026, in an interview with LBC Truss said the Bank of England "deliberately" made government borrowing more expensive during her time in power, claiming it was "ideologically against" what she was trying to do.

== See also ==
- Annual Meetings of the International Monetary Fund and the World Bank Group
- Bond vigilante
- Budget of the United Kingdom
- Free Enterprise Group
- Kansas experiment
- Laissez-faire
- March 2021 United Kingdom budget
- Singapore-on-Thames
