= Bank Job (book) =

2026 memoir by Liz Truss

- Author: Liz Truss
- Language: English
- Genre: Memoir
- Published: 26 October 2026
- Publisher: Free Speech Press
- Publication place: United Kingdom
- Pages: 99
- ISBN: 978-1918396423

Bank Job: A Short Book on how the Bank of England Broke the Bond Market and Brought Down the Government is a short memoir by former British Prime Minister Liz Truss, published by Free Speech Press on 26 October 2026. It details Truss's perspective on the causes of the October 2022 crisis that ended her brief premiership, following her proposed mini-budget.

== Background ==
Liz Truss was elected as conservative leader—and therefore became Prime Minister—in early September 2022. At the end of that month her Chancellor Kwasi Kwarteng introduced a mini-budget. The apparently unfunded tax-cuts that the budget contained caused a fall in the pound, a negative reaction from the bond markets and interventions from the Bank of England. The ensuing crisis led to first Kwarteng's and then Truss's resignations.

In the years following her premiership Truss would—through speeches, interviews, essays and a book—set out her belief that several institutions (part of the so called 'Blob'), particularly the Bank of England, conspired to undermine her and her programme.

== Content ==
In Bank Job Truss elaborates on her previous arguments that her mini-budget would have worked had it not been sabotaged by the Treasury, Bank of England, Office for Budget Responsibility, Resolution Foundation, Institute for Fiscal Studies and the Conservative Party. She additionally contends that most British journalists had little understanding of economics or monetary policy and so credulously believed what they were told by these institutions.

In the final chapter of the book she imagines what may have been had her policies been fully implemented, speculating that by 2040 "Several missions to Mars [would] have now been launched from Britain's space port" and that the country would have become a leader in AI and cryptocurrency development.

== Reception ==
=== Critical reception ===
The book was generally received negatively by critics.

Multiple reviewers criticised the conspiracy theorising that Truss engaged in throughout the book, and her lack of ability to take responsibility for the fallout of her mini-budget. Sean O'Grady of The Independent called the theories "outlandish". In a zero-star review in The Daily Telegraph, Simon Heffer concluded that out of every book he'd ever reviewed "that purported to offer a serious thesis", Bank Job was "without question the most deranged".

Robert Crampton, in The Times, found Truss "no better a writer than she was a prime minister" and was confused about the target demographic of the work that he saw as failing to appeal either to the general public at home—"too larded with jargon and nerdy nitpicking"—or an audience in the United States Right—too much of a "parochial, pedantic screed".

On the other hand, Toby Nangle, in the Financial Times section Alphaville, thought that there was some good points made, such as the highlighting of the vulnerabilities of Pension funds and the resulting financial instability in the gilt markets. However, as with others, he found that all of Truss's possibly useful contributions were "lost in the sea of denial and desperation to have not one iota of blame attached to her or her government." Likewise, Chief Political Commentator for The Times Patrick Maguire, found points concerning the unaccountability of the unellected members of the Bank of England and the Office for Budget Responsibility should be taken seriously, but that it was "implausible that she had absolutely nothing to do with the disaster."

=== Commercial reception ===
In its first week the book had sales 2645—making it number 2 on the Sunday Times non-fiction paper back chart—but the following week saw only 668 sales—leaving it outside of The Bookseller top 20.
