= Bournemouth International Centre =

English events venue

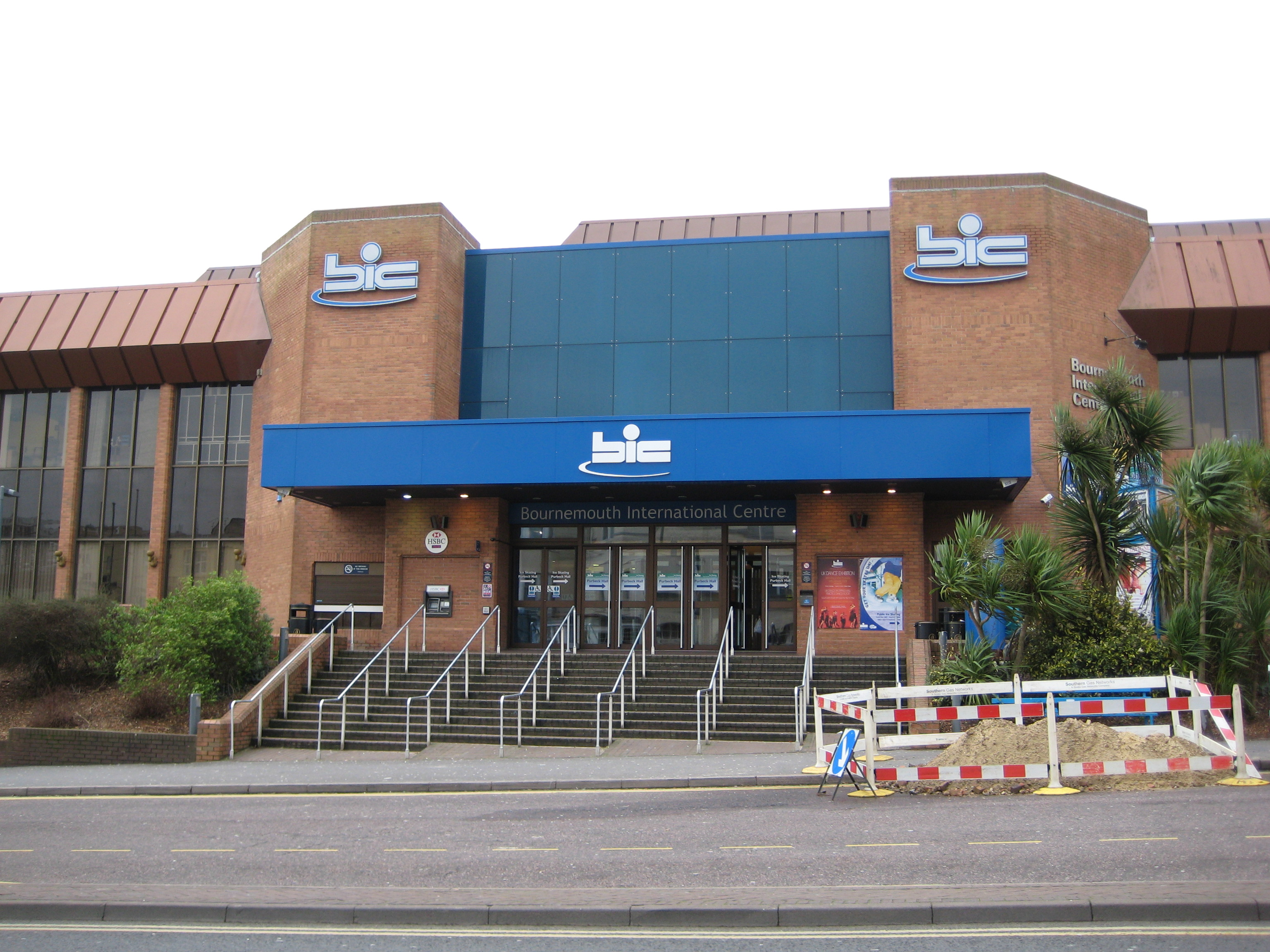
- Exterior of venue (c. 2018)
- Address: Exeter Rd; Bournemouth BH2 5BH England
- Coordinates: 50°43′00″N 1°52′41″W
- Owner: Bournemouth, Christchurch and Poole Council
- Operator: BH Live

Construction
- Built: 1982–84
- Opened: 6 September 1984
- Renovated: 2004
- Expanded: 1990
- Cost: £19.5 million (£69.5 million in 2025 pounds)

Website
- Venue Website

The Bournemouth International Centre (commonly known as the BIC /ˈbɪk/) in Bournemouth, Dorset, was opened in September 1984. It is one of the largest venues for conferences, exhibitions, entertainment and events in southern England. Additionally, it is well known for hosting national conferences of major British political parties and trade unions.

In June 2022, it was announced that the building would undergo a £1.8 million refurbishment.

== Conferences ==
The BIC has hosted national conferences of political parties and trade unions. Neil Kinnock notably attacked the militant tendency at the Labour Party Conference there in 1985, and Margaret Thatcher made her last Conservative Party Conference speech at the venue in 1990.

In 2007, it hosted the 6th UK International Salsa Congress from October 12th to 14th.

In recent years, both Labour and the Conservatives have held their conferences at larger venues in urban centres, such as Birmingham, Manchester and Liverpool, but the BIC has continued to host the Liberal Democrat Conference. In 2025, the BIC hosted the Green Party of England and Wales autumn conference.

== Venues ==
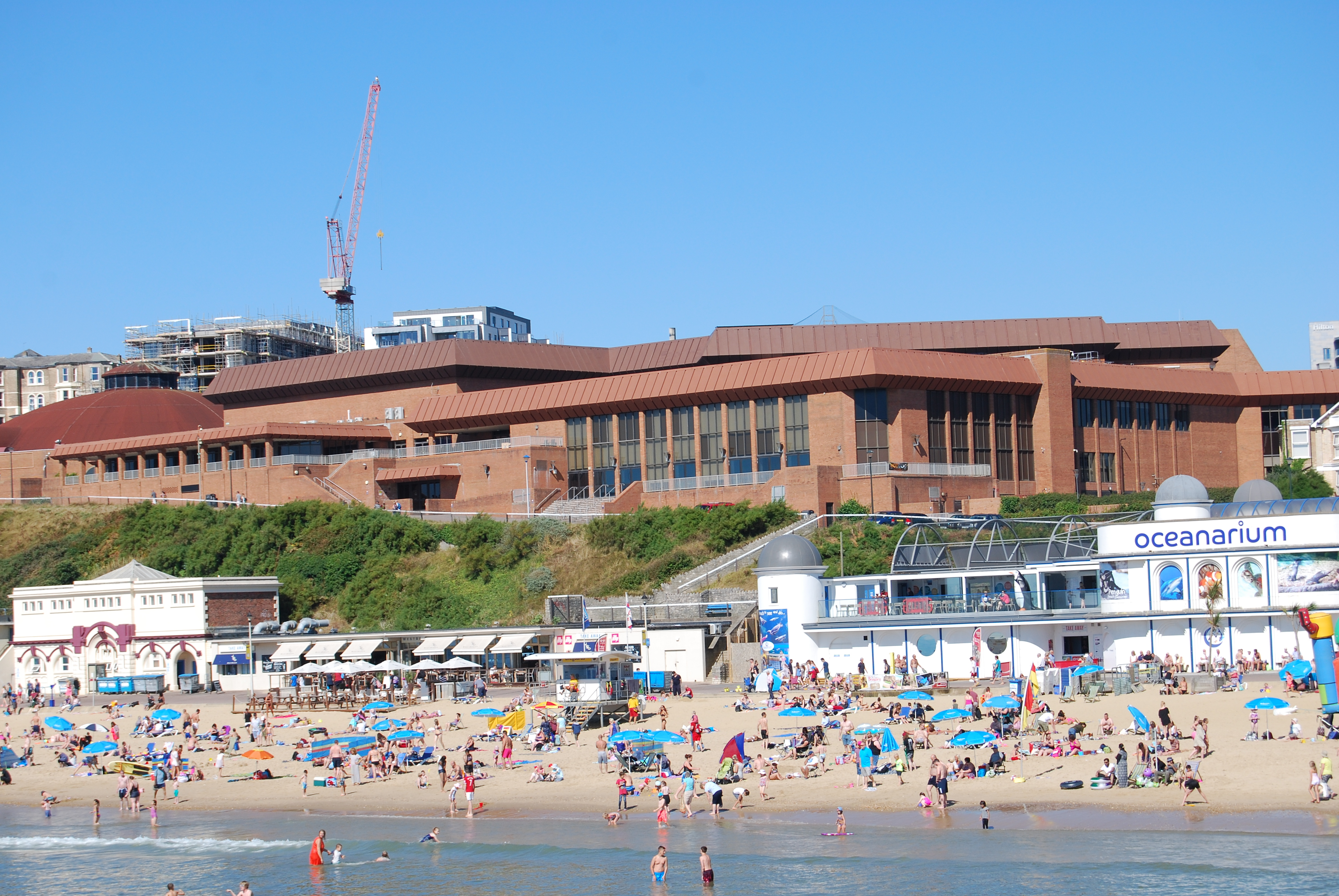
The BIC's location on the seafront

Upon its opening, the venue comprised two halls, the Windsor Hall and the Tregonwell Hall, as well as a leisure swimming pool, which has since been closed to provide further conference and exhibition space.

The venue's Windsor Hall has a concert capacity of 6,500 (standing) or 4,000 (seated), and is one of the bigger indoor music venues in England, often included on the arena tours of major artists. This hall has the largest tensile grid in Europe, a tensioned mesh comprising 30 miles of steel wire hung above the stage, which can suspend approximately 90 tonnes of weight.

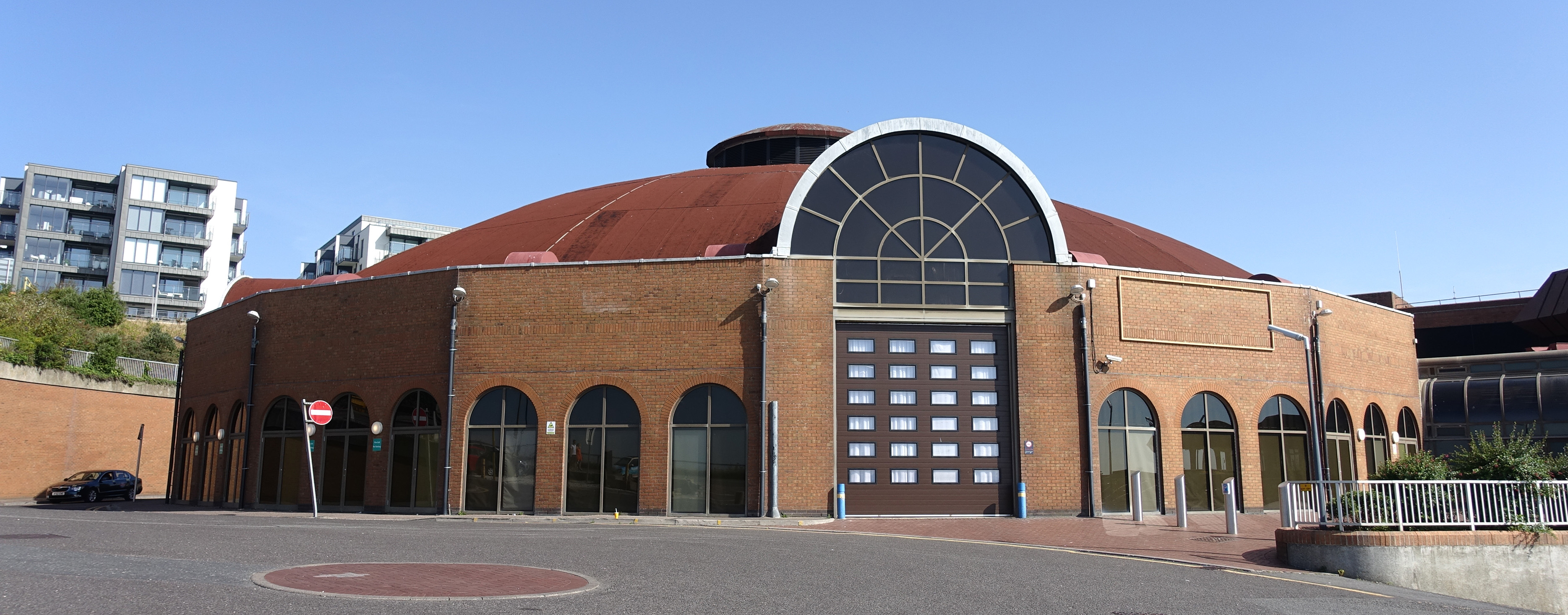
Purbeck Hall in August 2018

In 1990, the circular Purbeck Hall was added, at a cost of £6 million.

The Solent Hall can house exhibitions or hold up to 2,000 people for standing music concerts. As part of a refurbishment costing £22 million, this hall controversially replaced the popular swimming pool and wave machine in 2004, after an unsuccessful campaign to save the facility.

Managed by social enterprise BH Live in partnership with Bournemouth, Christchurch and Poole Council, the BIC is operated alongside its sister venue, the Pavilion Theatre and Ballroom.

== See also ==
- Pavilion Theatre and Ballroom
- List of venues in the United Kingdom
