= UK International Salsa Congress =

UK International Salsa Congress is a Salsa Congress, organized since 2002 by Salsa UK. The first 5 events were held at Butlins holiday camp in Bognor Regis on the South Coast of England.

The event takes place over a weekend with a showcase of international salsa talent each evening, followed by a salsa party and after-party through the night. During the daytime on Saturdays and Sundays, international and domestic salsa instructors conduct workshops for salsa dancers of all skill levels.

== Venue Change ==
2007 saw a change of venue to the Bournemouth International Centre (BIC) where the 6th UK International Salsa Congress was held between 12 & 14 October. There are many UK Salsa Congresses. Each has its flavor, among which is Teesside Festival UK.
