= 1976 sterling crisis =

Situation of prolonged doubt in the strength of Britain's currency

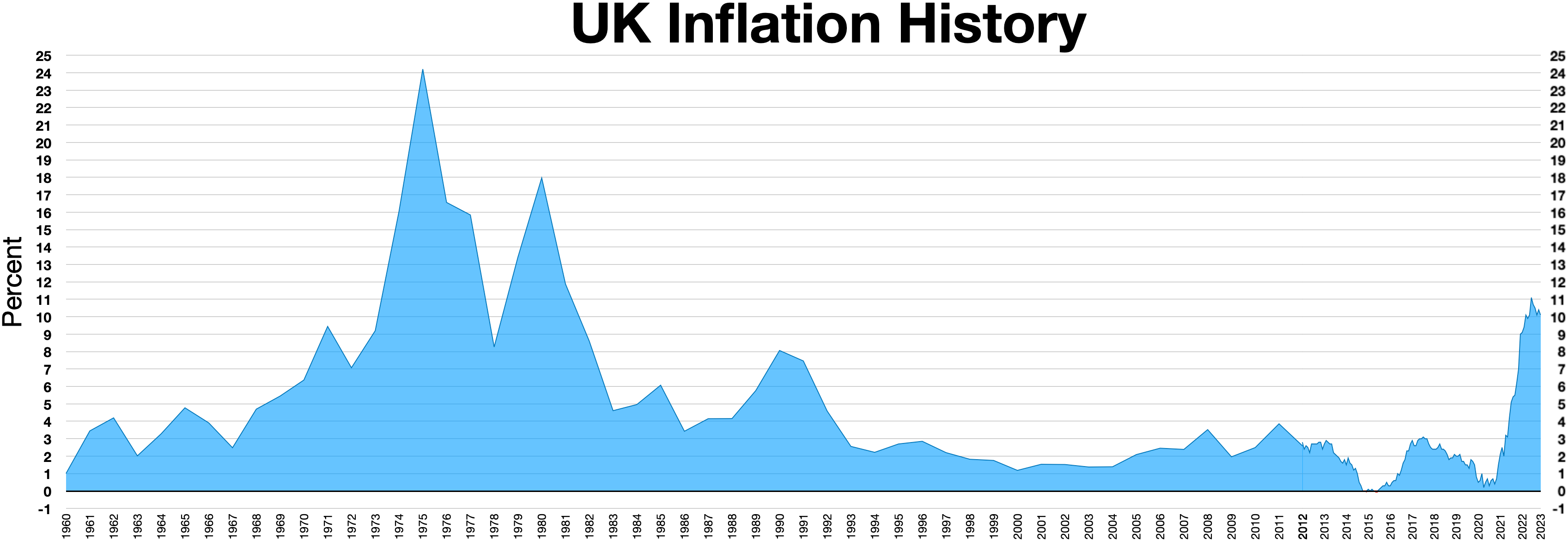
UK inflation history

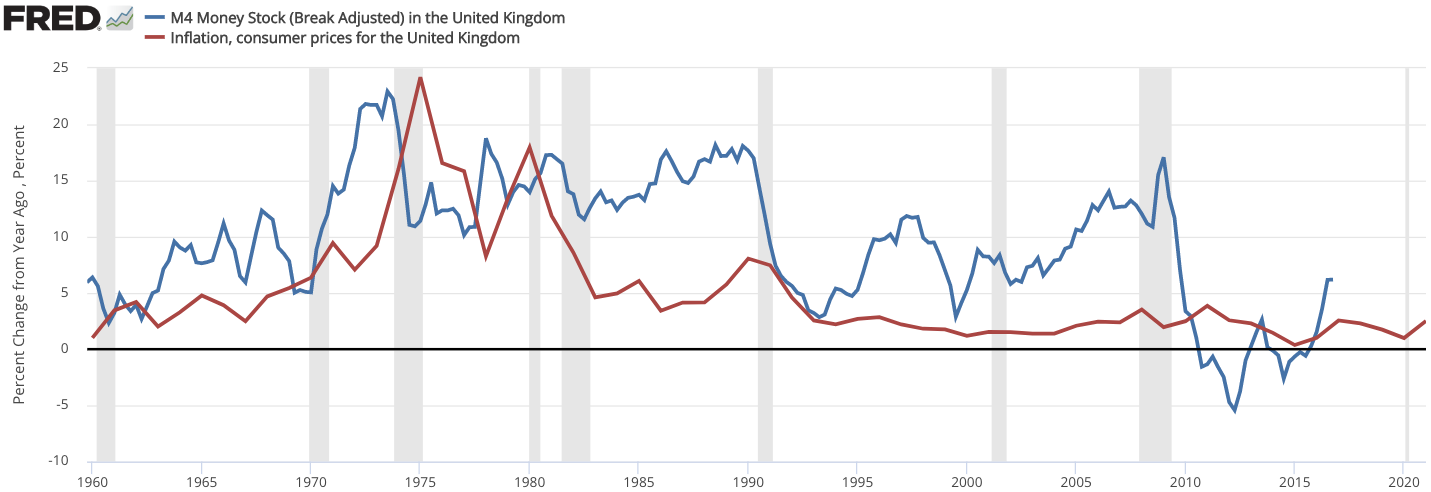
UK M4 Money Supply Increases UK Inflation

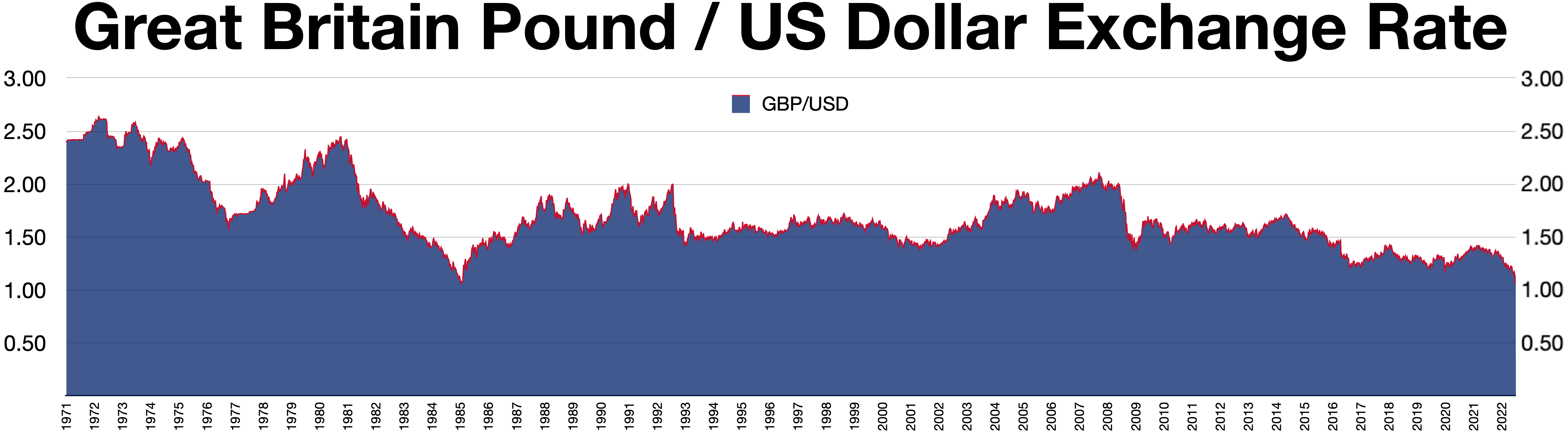
GBP/USD exchange rate

The 1976 sterling crisis was a currency crisis in the United Kingdom. Inflation (at close to 25% in 1975, causing high bond yields and borrowing costs), a balance-of-payments deficit, a public-spending deficit, and the 1973 oil crisis were contributors.

The origins of the crisis have been attributed to the 1972 Conservative "dash for growth" budget initiating the inflation cycle.

James Callaghan's Labour government had to borrow $3.9 billion (equivalent to $22.1 billion in 2025 dollars) from the International Monetary Fund (IMF), while implementing significant spending cuts, with the intention of maintaining the exchange rate of sterling. At the time this was the largest loan ever to have been requested from the IMF.

== History ==
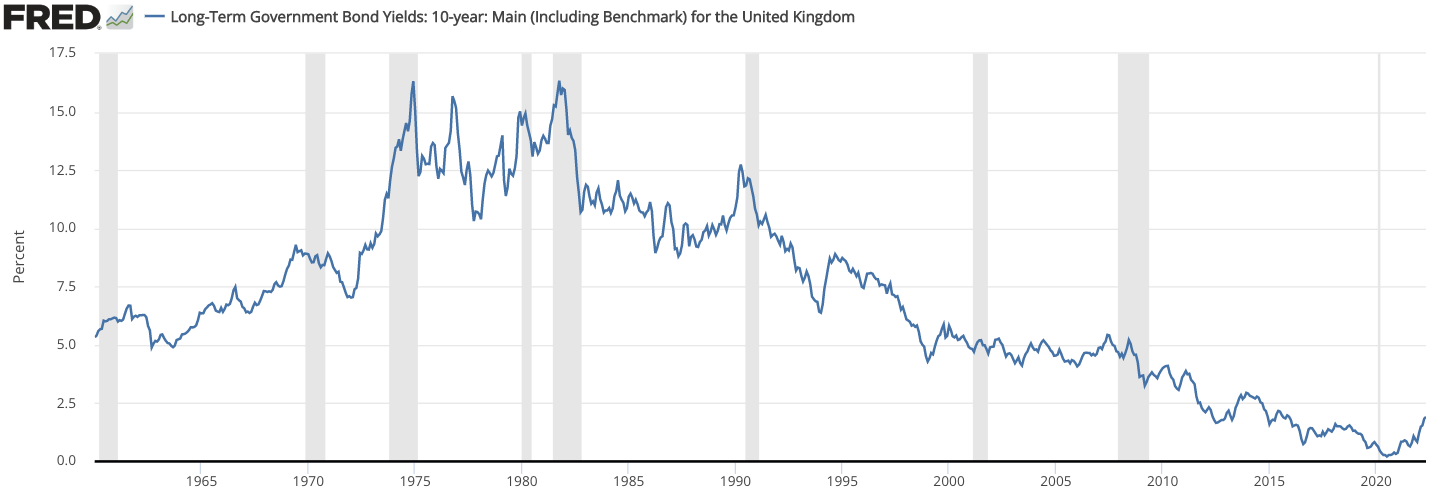
UK bonds 1960–2022 Government borrowing for debt (10-year bond) increased to over 15% in the 1970s and early 1980s.

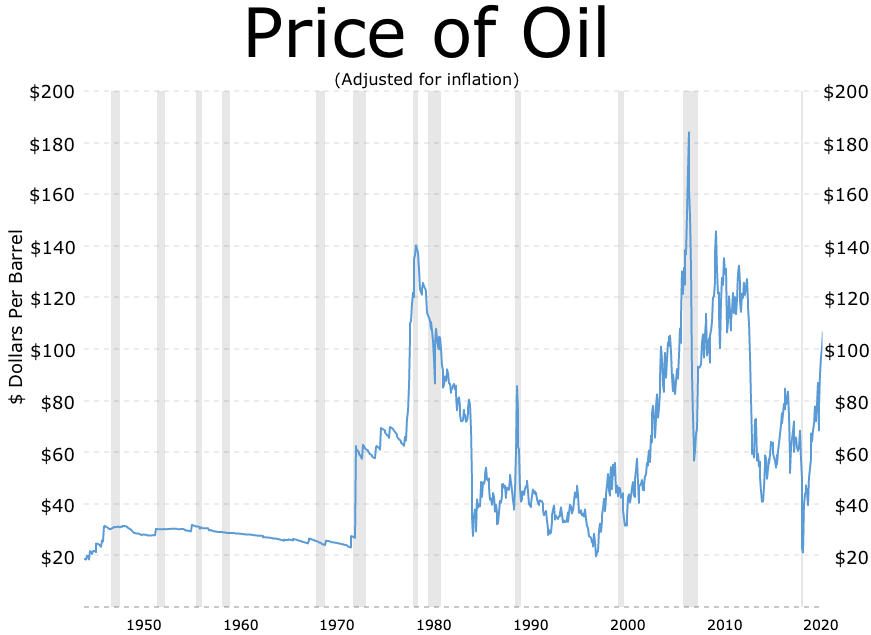
The 1973 oil crisis caused an increase in the price of Brent Crude.

Initiation of the inflationary cycle is traced to Anthony Barber's 1972 budget which was designed to return the Conservatives to power in an election expected in 1974 or 1975. This budget led to a brief period of growth known as "The Barber Boom," followed by a wage-price spiral, high inflation and currency depreciation, culminating in the 1976 sterling crisis. Barber was forced to introduce anti-inflation measures, along with a Price Commission and a Pay Board. The Conservatives lost the February 1974 general election (and the subsequent election held the same October) to Harold Wilson's Labour Party.

After the defeat of the 1976 public expenditure white paper in the House of Commons in March 1976 and the Bank of England withdrew temporarily from the foreign exchange market, Harold Wilson resigned as prime minister and was replaced by James Callaghan in April. Sterling continued to be under pressure on the foreign exchange markets such that, by June 1976, the pound had reached a record low against the dollar.

=== Oil shocks ===
In 1967, the Suez Canal closed down for eight years following the Six-Day War of that year, when Israel took and occupied the Sinai Peninsula for 15 years. That triggered the 1967 Oil Embargo, which only lasted a few months. In 1966, the year before it closed, 20% of all world oil cargo tonnage passed through the canal, with most of it heading north for Europe.

In 1973, the Yom Kippur War was fought, with Egypt crossing the Suez Canal aiming to take back the Sinai Peninsula from Israel. This triggered the 1973 oil crisis and embargo. Britain was an ally to Israel during the Arab–Israeli conflict. The oil crisis presented a severe economic shock to Britain, which it was ill-placed to withstand.

== Outcome ==
Only half of the loan was actually drawn by the British government and it was repaid by 4 May 1979, the day after the general election. Denis Healey, the Chancellor of the Exchequer at the time, went on to state that the main reason the loan had to be requested was that public sector borrowing requirement figures provided by the Treasury were grossly overstated.

The IMF loan meant that the United Kingdom's economy could be stabilised whilst drastic budget cuts were implemented. Despite the security provided by the loan, the Labour Party had already begun separating into social democratic and more socialist camps, causing bitter rows inside the party and with the trades unions. The sterling crisis and IMF bailout contributed to Margaret Thatcher's 1979 Conservative victory.

== See also ==
- Economic history of the United Kingdom
- Galloping inflation – Inflation that develops at a rapid pace
- Stagflation – High inflation, low economic growth, and high unemployment
- Sterling – Currency of the United Kingdom
- Sterling crisis, other currency crises in British history
- Winter of Discontent – Winter of 1978–79 in the United Kingdom
- Closure of the Suez Canal (1967–1975) shortly after the start of the "Six-Day War" or Third Arab–Israeli War
- 1970s commodities boom – Rise of many commodity prices in the 70s
- Alternative Economic Strategy – Economic policy proposed by Tony Benn
