= Galloping inflation =

Inflation that develops at a rapid pace

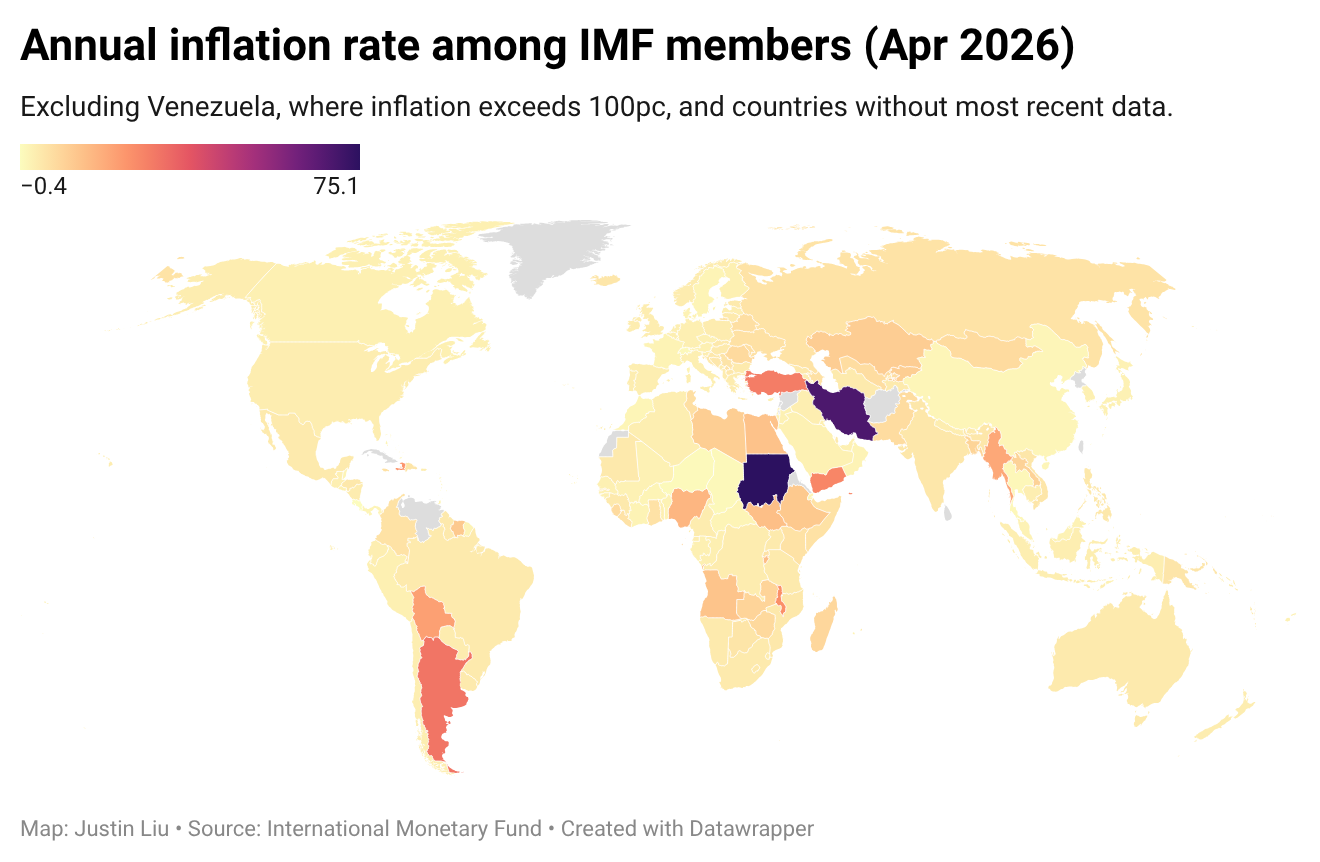
Inflation rates among members of the International Monetary Fund in April 2026.

Galloping inflation (also jumping inflation) is one that develops at a rapid pace (dual or triple-digit annual rates), perhaps only for a brief period. Such form of inflation is dangerous for the economy as it mostly affects the middle and low-income classes of population. Importantly, galloping inflation can precipitate an economic depression. Nevertheless, galloping inflation can still be accompanied by real economic growth.

== Overview ==
Galloping inflation is characterized by the rates of price growth that are higher than those of the moderate (creeping) inflation, but lower than those of the hyperinflation. There are no strictly defined parameters of galloping inflation due to the fact that inflationary processes manifest themselves differently in different types of economic systems. As a rule, galloping inflation is recognized as a price increase of 10–100% per year; sometimes there are other limits (10–50% or 20–100%). Paul A. Samuelson limited galloping inflation to 200% per year.

In contrast to the moderate one, galloping inflation is increasingly difficult to manage for monetary authorities as this type of inflation constantly requires an adequate indexation of wages (and other benefits) and measures to contain prices. A characteristic feature of galloping inflation is high risks associated with fixing contracts at nominal prices. Contracts should either stipulate price increases or be nominated in a stable foreign currency. For example, in Russia, during the period of galloping inflation of 1990s, prices for goods and services were often nominated in US dollars.

=== Causes ===
From the macroeconomics point of view, the causes can be divided into: monetary (the result of an inefficient monetary policy), structural (changes in the economic system), and external (the influence of foreign states).

- The sharp increase in the unsecured money supply without proportional increase in the supply of goods and services;
- Militarization of the economy. The increase in spending on the armed forces is associated with the conduct of military operations or the general instability of the political situation.
- The growth of foreign exchange rates. The stable development of the foreign economies leads to the strengthening of their currencies, thus reducing in the strength of the national currency. For example, after the introduction of the euro in 2002, the less developed EU member states that retained their national currencies began to enter into contracts nominated in euros.
- Lower prices for the main export products or commodities. For example, the fall of the price for oil in 2000 provoked galloping inflation in a number of petroleum-based economies.
- Stagnation of the national economy. The stagnating economies may experience a budget deficit and, therefore, a sharp increase in the external debt—that becomes very hard to service and devalues the local currency.

=== Consequences of galloping inflation ===
Galloping inflation causes:

- Concerns for households and companies as they are not able to save money for the future;
- Desire to get rid of cash by buying goods, precious metals, and real estate in order to save the real value of money;
- Refusal by banks to provide loans with fixed interest rates;
- Fall in the volume of bank deposits;
- Problems for companies to prepare long-term business plans as managers are not able to adequately calculate long-term capital expenditures.

Each of the above may further lead to hyperinflation, sovereign default on state debt, or currency denomination—the issuance of new national monetary units.

== Examples ==
Galloping inflation is a more frequent economic phenomenon than hyperinflation and is periodically observed even in the most economically developed countries. In most of the latter, galloping inflation was observed in the post-war years (1945–1952) and in the 1970s due to the increase in prices for oil set by OPEC. Also, galloping inflation is typical for the countries with transition economies.

In the 2000s, the number of countries experiencing galloping inflation declined sharply.

== See also ==
- Barter
- Complementary currency
- Currency debasement
- Financial repression
