= Anti-growth coalition =

Pejorative term by Liz Truss

The "anti-growth coalition" is a British pejorative term and political slogan used by former British Prime Minister Liz Truss during and after her premiership in 2022 against those critical of her policy agenda, particularly of the September mini-budget under Kwasi Kwarteng. It was used in an attempt to portray its targets, including the main opposition parties and environmental activists, as a coalition of interests opposed to the United Kingdom's economic growth, and to portray herself and her allies as pro-growth.

== Background ==
In September 2022, Chancellor of the Exchequer Kwasi Kwarteng had delivered a Ministerial Statement known as a mini-budget to the House of Commons. The budget launched large-scale tax cuts, many of which were unfunded and unaudited. The statement received significant criticism from the press, as well as from think tanks, opposition parties, and other commentators.

== Use ==
Truss coined the term during her speech at the Conservative Party Conference on 5 October 2022, assigning to the term various organisations and individuals including opposition parties, "Labour", "the Lib Dems", "the SNP", "militant unions", "vested interests dressed up as think tanks", "talking heads", "Brexit deniers", "Extinction Rebellion", podcasters, and people who "take taxis from north London townhouses to the BBC studios." She stated that she "will not allow the anti-growth coalition of Labour, the Lib Dems and the SNP to hold us back." Following a protest by Greenpeace earlier during her speech, she also stated that they were part of the "coalition," and stated that she was "not interested in how many two-for-one offers you buy at the supermarket." She also stated "I have three priorities for our economy: growth, growth and growth."

On 18 October 2022 in parliament, Home Secretary Suella Braverman also used the term, stating in reference to recent Just Stop Oil protests that "It's the Labour party, it's the Lib Dems, it's the coalition of chaos, it's the Guardian-reading, tofu-eating wokerati, dare I say, the anti-growth coalition that we have to thank for the disruption that we are seeing on our roads today."

In an address to the Institute for Government think tank in September 2023, Truss stated that "The anti-growth coalition is now a powerful force, comprising the economic and political elite, corporatist part of the media, and even a section of the Conservative parliamentary party."

== Criticism ==
The Financial Times wrote that "the absurdity of the term is matched by its hypocrisy," noting that "expanding economic output is a laudable goal, but the government's plan to hit 2.5 per cent annual growth, which it relies on to bring debt under control, is dubious," and arguing that there were many "nimbies" who "block[ed] housing, renewable energy, and infrastructure projects," who were also Conservative members of parliament. Richard Partington for The Guardian argued that Truss' own plans for the economy were "more likely to be anti-growth than those of her critics." Adrian Woolridge of Bloomberg News wrote that "the Tory Party also increasingly rests on an anti-growth coalition," and that Conservative voters "routinely oppose the building of new houses that might spoil their views and new shops and stores that might clog their roads." Graham Lawson, writing for the New Scientist, stated that "there is an anti-growth coalition in the UK. It is led by the dinosaurs who think that conserving the environment and economic progress are mutually incompatible."

Several public figures sought to dissociate themselves with the term. Mick Lynch, head of the National Union of Rail, Maritime and Transport Workers, stated that "the idea that I'm sitting around with other people saying, 'let's form a coalition so we can stop economic growth in Britain', it's just a nonsense. Everyone believes in economic growth, otherwise the economy doesn't move forward. But what they mean by economic growth is the rich keep getting richer and working people continue to have their conditions diluted in the name of profit." Jamie Oliver, who has advocated against "buy one get one free" offers, rejected the term after the Government did not rule out that Truss' remarks about "two-for-one offers" also included him as part of the "coalition".

Commentators and comedians noted the large breadth of targets of the term. Mitch Benn in The New European noted that "as far as I can tell, the 'Anti-Growth Coalition' consists of pretty much everyone except Ms Truss herself, some – but by no means all – of her parliamentary party, and the somewhere between 20 and 25% of the electorate." Joe Lycett joked on Twitter that Kwarteng was "also part of the anti-growth coalition" following his dismissal as chancellor in October 2022. Graham Lawson noted that he identified with a large number of aspects included under the term by both Truss and Braverman, and called the term a "total dud" in terms of its efficacy as a three-word slogan.

The degrowth movement, which explicitly argues against economic growth and includes academics, environmental activists and some Labour Party members, was noted by the Financial Times as one of the "ironies" concerning the term. George Monbiot wrote in The Guardian that he himself was part of the "anti-growth coalition", that "for Truss and those around her, growth is an end in itself," and that this was "entirely divorced from utility." Rahlia Gupta of Byline Times also used the term to make the case for degrowth.

== See also ==
- Liberal elite
- Loony left
