= 1972 United Kingdom budget =

- Presented: 21 March 1972
- Country: United Kingdom
- Parliament: 45th
- Party: Conservative Party
- Chancellor: Anthony Barber

The 1972 United Kingdom budget (also known as the dash for growth budget) was a budget delivered by Anthony Barber, the Chancellor of the Exchequer, on 21 March 1972. The budget is remembered for its large tax cuts, and led to high inflation and demands for higher wages, as well as the 1976 sterling crisis when the UK government was forced to ask the International Monetary Fund for financial help. It also led the Conservative Party to abandon "Post-war consensus" policies.

== History ==
The Conservative government of Edward Heath came to power at the 1970 general election held in June of that year, with a plan for free-market–oriented policies as solutions to the country's unemployment and inflation problems, but subsequent events would force the government to largely abandon this strategy.

Unemployment had increased considerably by 1972, and in January of that year, the number of unemployed had reached a million, the highest level for more than two decades. Opposed to unemployment on moral grounds, Heath encouraged a famous "U-Turn" in economic policy that precipitated what became known as the "Barber boom".

This was a two-step process involving the budgets of 1972 and 1973, the former of which pumped £2.5 billion (Note: about £24 billion at 2021 prices) into the economy in increased pensions and benefits and tax reductions, all of it largely paid for through government borrowing. Among the tax cuts was a £1bn cut in income tax and incentives to business to retain jobs.

In terms of government borrowing, £3.4bn (Note: about £33 billion at 2021 prices) would be required to pay for the 1972 budget. With inflation standing at 7.3%, Prime Minister Heath and Chancellor Barber had introduced an official growth target of 5%, with Barber forecasting UK growth would be at 10% within two years. Public expenditure controls were also lifted, with Barber describing his objective as being "To achieve a rate of growth twice as fast as in the past decade".

Within 15 months, with sterling's peg with the dollar having become indefensible, Barber was forced to float the pound, resulting in its rapid depreciation and a consequent increase in inflation. His next budget would see the introduction of wage freezes in an attempt to control inflation, something that led to confrontation with the miners. The UK found itself plunged into the first recession since World War II.

By early 1974, and as a result of the government's Keynesian economic strategy, unemployment had fallen to under 550,000. The economic boom did not last, and the Heath government implemented various cuts that led to the abandonment of policy goals such as a planned expansion of nursery education. The situation was worsened by industrial unrest, as well as the 1973 oil crisis. Inflation eventually reached double digits, and by 1979, interest rates had increased to 11.3%; they would average 12.7% between 1980 and 1989.

Against this background, Heath called a general election in February 1974, which saw the Conservatives replaced by a Labour government. The UK economy continued to perform poorly and in 1976 the government of James Callaghan was required to go to the International Monetary Fund for a loan to help keep the economy afloat. The 1972 budget also led to Heath's defeat at the 1975 Conservative leadership election, which saw Margaret Thatcher elected to lead the party. She would go on to win the 1979 general election. The fallout from the budget throughout the 1970s also convinced many Conservatives that " Keynesian measures which used government spending to boost the economy and cut unemployment, no longer worked".

The mini-budget held on 23 September 2022 has been compared to the 1972 budget because of the large tax cuts announced by the Chancellor, Kwasi Kwarteng, and the negative impact it had on international markets.

== See also ==
- Lawson Boom
