= Party conference season =

Annual period in UK politics

In the United Kingdom the party conference season is a period of three weeks during September and October of each year, whilst the House of Commons is in recess, in which the annual political party conferences are held.

The Conservative Party Conference, Labour Party Conference and the twice-per-year Liberal Democrat Conference, representing the three largest UK-wide political parties, in terms of seats held, hold their main annual conferences in the autumn. These occur in reverse order to this list, and remains the order regardless as to which party is in government.

In contrast to its main opponents' conferences, the Liberal Democrats grant all party members attending its conference, either in-person or online, the right to vote on party policy, under a one-member, one vote system. Among the three largest UK-wide parties, the Liberal Democrat conference is also unique in providing a ring-fenced access fund, which defrays travel and accommodation costs for both disabled and low-income attendees.

UK-wide political party conferences have traditionally taken place in seaside resorts, at places such as the Empress Ballroom at Winter Gardens in Blackpool, the Brighton Centre in Brighton and the Bournemouth International Centre in Bournemouth, largely due to there being plenty of cheap accommodation available in such towns at the end of the summer holiday season. However, for the two largest parties, they are increasingly taking place in major cities with modern, purpose-built conference centres, such as the International Convention Centre (ICC) in Birmingham, the Central Convention Complex in Manchester and the Arena and Convention Centre (ACC) in Liverpool.

Conferences for the devolved Scottish and Welsh parties of the UK-wide Labour, Liberal Democrat and Conservative parties are held in March, while the Scottish Green Party holds two conferences each year – a one-day policy event alongside the devolved conferences in March and a two or three day main conference during the main conference season.

There is an unofficial agreement between the parties that they will stagger the timing of their conferences such that media attention be undivided, though smaller parties do not always abide by this rule firmly. In 2012, for example, there was an overlap between the Liberal Democrat and United Kingdom Independence Party annual conferences, with the latter concluding on the opening day of the former, and in 2013 the Liberal Democrat and Green Party of England and Wales conferences overlapped by three days.

== Television coverage ==
Until the second half of the 1980s, with the exception of a mid-morning break for Play School, BBC television had broadcast live, uninterrupted coverage of all of the party conferences, as well as the Trades Union Congress and the Confederation of British Industry (CBI) conference. However, the commencement of daytime television in October 1986, and with it an extended children's programming block, meant that the mid-morning interruption extended to 40 minutes from 1987 onwards, with further coverage breaks at 10am and 12noon for news summaries, with the notable exception of the Trades Union Congress which was shown uninterrupted on BBC2 due to it taking place before the commencement of the new term's schools broadcasts. Subsequent years saw coverage on BBC TV continue to be gradually reduced.

1992 saw the launch of The Parliamentary Channel and live, uninterrupted coverage of the three main party conferences was broadcast, without commentary or interviews. This continued after BBC Parliament took over the service in 1998. However, cutbacks at BBC Parliament in 2021 saw it drop all of its political programming with the channel reduced to nothing other than live and recorded coverage from Westminster and the devolved chambers and 2019 was the final time that BBC Parliament aired coverage of the coverage of the party conferences. This now means that linear television no longer provides significant coverage, with live coverage on BBC Two restricted to the party leaders’ speeches of the three main political parties.

Until the early 1980s, ITV, and then, for a short while, Channel 4, also showed coverage. ITV and Channel 4's coverage is now restricted to its scheduled news bulletins.

On radio, coverage was restricted to clips in scheduled news bulletins. However, the launch of BBC Radio 5 Live in 1994 saw the first live radio coverage, which includes the live broadcast of the leaders' speeches.

== 2026 conference season ==
The confirmed dates for the 2026 conferences are as follows:

Party	Venue	City/Town	Country	Date
Alliance Party of Northern Ireland	Crowne Plaza Hotel	Belfast	Northern Ireland	14 March
People Before Profit	Wynn's Hotel	Dublin	Republic of Ireland	21 March
Traditional Unionist Voice	Royal Hotel	Cookstown	Northern Ireland	21 March
Sinn Féin	ICC Belfast	Belfast	Northern Ireland	24–25 April
Green Party Northern Ireland	Clayton Hotel	Belfast	Northern Ireland	16 May
Reform UK	National Exhibition Centre, Birmingham	Birmingham	England	3–5 September
Social Democratic and Labour Party	Crowne Plaza Hotel	Belfast	Northern Ireland	11–12 September
Democratic Unionist Party	La Mon Hotel & Country Club	Belfast	Northern Ireland	18–19 September
Liberal Democrat	Brighton Centre	Brighton	England	19–22 September
Ulster Unionist Party	Crowne Plaza Hotel	Belfast	Northern Ireland	26 September
Labour Party (UK)	ACC Liverpool	Liverpool	England	27–30 September
Green Party of England and Wales	Brighton Centre	Brighton	England	2–4 October
Plaid Cymru	Venue Cymru	Llandudno	Wales	2–3 October
Conservative Party (UK)	International Convention Centre, Birmingham	Birmingham	England	4–7 October
Scottish National Party	The Event Complex Aberdeen	Aberdeen	Scotland	16–17 October
Scottish Greens	Eden Court Theatre	Inverness	Scotland	24–25 October
Co-Operative Party	Co-operative Party Website	Online	Online	28–29 November

Restore Britain did not organise a party conference in 2026.

== 2025 conference season ==
The dates for the 2025 conferences were as follows:

Party	Venue	City/Town	Country	Date
Reform UK	NEC Birmingham	Birmingham	England	5–6 September
Trades Union Congress	Brighton Centre	Brighton	England	7–10 September
Liberal Democrats (UK)	Bournemouth International Centre	Bournemouth	England	20–23 September
Labour Party (UK)	ACC Liverpool	Liverpool	England	28 September – 1 October
Green Party of England and Wales	Bournemouth International Centre	Bournemouth	England	3–5 October
Conservative Party (UK)	Manchester Central Convention Complex	Manchester	England	5–8 October
Plaid Cymru	Brangwyn Hall	Swansea	Wales	10–11 October
Welsh Liberal Democrats	Ramada Plaza	Wrexham	Wales	10–12 October
Scottish National Party	The Event Complex Aberdeen	Aberdeen	Scotland	11–13 October
Scottish Green Party	John McIntyre Conference Centre	Edinburgh	Scotland	17–19 October
Scottish Liberal Democrats	Radisson Blu Hotel	Glasgow	Scotland	18 October
Wales Green Party	Clayton Hotel	Cardiff	Wales	8–9 November
Co-operative Party	TBC	London	England	15-16 November
Your Party (UK)	ACC Liverpool	Liverpool	England	29-30 November

== 2024 conference season ==
The dates for the 2024 conferences were as follows:

Party	Venue	City/Town	Country	Date
Scottish National Party	Edinburgh International Conference Centre	Edinburgh	Scotland	30 August – 1 September
Green Party of England and Wales	Manchester Central Convention Complex	Manchester	England	6–8 September
Trades Union Congress	Brighton Centre	Brighton	England	8–11 September
Liberal Democrats (UK)	Brighton Centre	Brighton	England	14–17 September
Reform Party (UK)	NEC Birmingham	Marston Green	England	20–21 September
Labour Party (UK)	ACC Liverpool	Liverpool	England	22–25 September
Conservative Party (UK)	International Convention Centre, Birmingham	Birmingham	England	29 September – 2 October
Plaid Cymru	Principality Stadium	Cardiff	Wales	11–12 October
Scottish Green Party	Beacon Arts Centre	Greenock	Scotland	26–27 October

== 2023 conference season ==
After 2022's cancellation of the Liberal Democrats Party Conference in Brighton due to the death of Queen Elizabeth II, the 2023 edition of the Liberal Democrats Party Conference returned to Bournemouth for the first time, with the dates for the 2023 conferences were as follows:

Party	Venue	City/Town	Country	Date	Ref
Trades Union Congress	ACC Liverpool	Liverpool	England	10–13 September	
Liberal Democrats	Bournemouth International Centre	Bournemouth	England	23–26 September	
Conservatives	Manchester Central Convention Complex	Manchester	England	1–4 October	
Plaid Cymru	Aberystwyth Arts Centre	Aberystwyth	Wales	6–7 October	
Green Party of England and Wales	Brighton Centre	Brighton	England	6–8 October	
Reform UK	Hilton London Metropole	London	England	7 October	
Labour	ACC Liverpool	Liverpool	England	8–11 October	
Scottish National Party	P&J Live	Aberdeen	Scotland	15–17 October	
Scottish Green Party	Carnegie Conference Centre	Dunfermline	Scotland	28–29 October	

== 2022 conference season ==
Following the Death of Elizabeth II, the Liberal Democrats cancelled their planned conference whilst Trades Union Congress rescheduled theirs, both as a mark of respect to the Queen. The dates and locations for the 2022 conferences were as follows:

- Liberal Democrats - Brighton Centre - Planned Saturday 17 September to Tuesday 20 September (cancelled)
- Labour - ACC Liverpool - Sunday 25 September to Wednesday 28 September
- Green Party of England and Wales - Harrogate Convention Centre - Friday 30 September to Sunday 2 October
- Reform UK - Birmingham - Sunday 2 October
- Conservatives - International Convention Centre, Birmingham - Sunday 2 October to Wednesday 5 October
- Trades Union Congress - Brighton Centre - Tuesday 18 October to Thursday 20 October (originally Sunday 11 September)

== 2021 conference season ==
The Party conferences largely reverted to physical attendance following their cancellation the previous year due to the COVID-19 pandemic, but some parties opted to keep their conferences online and some opted for a mix of both, with the dates and locations as follows:

- Trades Union Congress - Online Only - Sunday 12 September to Tuesday 14 September
- Liberal Democrats - Online Only - Friday 17 September to Monday 20 September
- Labour - Brighton Centre - Saturday 25 September to Wednesday 29 September
- Conservatives - Manchester Central Convention Complex - Sunday 3 October to Wednesday 6 October.
- Plaid Cymru - Aberystwyth Arts Centre - Friday 15 October to Saturday 16 October
- Green Party of England and Wales - The Eastside Rooms, Birmingham - Friday 22 October to Sunday 24 October
- Reform UK - Manchester - 1 October to 2 October
- Scottish National Party - Online Only - Friday 26 November to Monday 29 November
- UK Independence Party (UKIP) - The Dome, Worthing, East Sussex - Sunday 17 October - Monday 18 October

== 2020 conference season ==
The dates and locations of the 2020 conferences were planned to be as follows:

- Labour – Saturday 19 September to Wednesday 23 September at the ACC Liverpool
- Liberal Democrats – Saturday 26 September to Tuesday 29 September at the Brighton Centre
- Green Party of England and Wales – Friday 2 to Sunday 11 October online at https://www.greenparty.org.uk/conference/
- Conservatives – Sunday 4 October to Wednesday 7 October at the International Convention Centre, Birmingham

However, as a result of the COVID-19 pandemic all the physical party conferences were moved online. The Labour conference was replaced by an online event called "Labour Connected" from 19 to 22 September, the Liberal Democrat conference was rescheduled for 25 to 28 September and the Conservative conference for 3 to 6 October. The Scottish National Party conference was the last major party conference of the season, held online from 28 to 30 November.

== 2019 conference season ==
The dates and locations of the Autumn 2019 conferences were as follows:

Party	Start date	End date	Venue	Notes
*Trades Union Congress -	Sunday 8 September 2019	Wednesday 11 September 2019	The Brighton Centre	
Liberal Democrats	Saturday 14 September 2019	Tuesday 17 September 2019	Bournemouth International Centre	
Labour	Saturday 21 September 2019	Wednesday 25 September 2019	The Brighton Centre	
Conservatives	Sunday 29 September 2019	Wednesday 2 October 2019	Manchester Central Convention Complex	
Green Party of England and Wales	Friday 4 October 2019	Sunday 6 October 2019	International Convention Centre Wales	
Plaid Cymru	Friday 4 October 2019	Sunday 6 October 2019	Swansea Grand Theatre	
Scottish National Party	Sunday 13 October 2019	Tuesday 15 October 2019	The Event Complex Aberdeen	
Scottish Green Party	Saturday 12 October 2019	Sunday 13 October 2019	Eden Court Inverness	

As a result of the defeat for the Government in Miller/Cherry, the September prorogation of Parliament was declared void, and Parliament sat from 25 September. This meant that the Labour conference was cut short and – after failing to win a vote for a recess – that the Conservative conference clashed with the sitting of Parliament for the first time.

The dates and locations of other 2019 conferences were as follows:

Party	Start date	End date	Venue	Notes
Scottish Liberal Democrats	Friday 22 February	Saturday 23 February	The Hamilton Townhouse	
Scottish Labour	Friday 8 March	Sunday 10 March	Caird Hall, Dundee	
Liberal Democrats	Friday 15 March	Sunday 17 March	Barbican Centre, York	
Plaid Cymru	Friday 22 March	Saturday 23 March	Pontio Centre, Bangor	
Welsh Liberal Democrats	Saturday 6 April	Sunday 7 April	Marriott Hotel, Cardiff	
Scottish National Party	Saturday 27 April	Sunday 28 April	Edinburgh International Conference Centre	
Scottish Conservatives	Friday 3 May	Saturday 4 May	Aberdeen Exhibition and Conference Centre	
Green Party of England and Wales	Friday 7 June	Monday 10 June	The Spa, Scarborough	

== 2018 conference season ==
The dates and locations of the 2018 conferences were as follows:

Party	Start date	End date	Venue	Notes
Trades Union Congress	Sunday 9 September	Wednesday 12 September	Manchester Central	
Liberal Democrats	Saturday 15 September	Tuesday 18 September	Brighton Centre	
Labour	Sunday 23 September	Wednesday 26 September	ACC Liverpool	
Conservatives	Sunday 30 September	Wednesday 3 October	ICC, Birmingham	
Scottish Conservatives	Friday 2 March	Saturday 3 March	Aberdeen Exhibition and Conference Centre (cancelled)	
Scottish National Party	Friday 8 June	Saturday 9 June	Aberdeen Exhibition and Conference Centre	
UKIP	Friday 21 September	Saturday 22 September	ICC, Birmingham	
Plaid Cymru	5 October	6 October	Theatr Mwldan, Cardigan	
Green Party of England and Wale	Friday 5 October	Sunday 7 October	City Hall, Bristol	
Libertarian Party UK	Saturday 6 October	Saturday 6 October	MK Conferencing, Milton Keynes	
Scottish National Party	Sunday 7 October	Tuesday 9 October	The SEC Centre, Glasgow	
Cooperative Party	Friday 12 October	Sunday 14 October	Mercure Grand Hotel, Bristol	
Scottish Green Party	20 October	21 October	University of Strathclyde Technology and Innovation Centre, Glasgow	
Women's Equality Party	Friday 7 September	Sunday 9 September	Kettering Conference Centre	

== 2017 conference season ==
The dates and locations of the 2017 conferences were as follows:

Party	Start date	End date	Venue	Notes
Liberal Democrats	Saturday 16 September	Tuesday 19 September	Bournemouth International Centre	
Labour	Sunday 24 September	Wednesday 27 September	Brighton Centre	
UKIP	Friday 29 September	Saturday 30 September	Riviera International Conference Centre in Torquay	
Conservatives	Sunday 1 October	Wednesday 4 October	Manchester Central Convention Complex	
Green Party of England and Wales	Saturday 7 October	Tuesday 10 October	Harrogate International Centre	
Scottish National Party	Sunday 8 October	Tuesday 10 October	The SEC Centre, Glasgow	
Plaid Cymru	Friday 20 October	Saturday 21 October	Galeri, Caernarfon	
Scottish Green Party	Saturday 21 October	Sunday 22 October	Edinburgh Napier University Sighthill Campus, Edinburgh	

== 2016 conference season ==
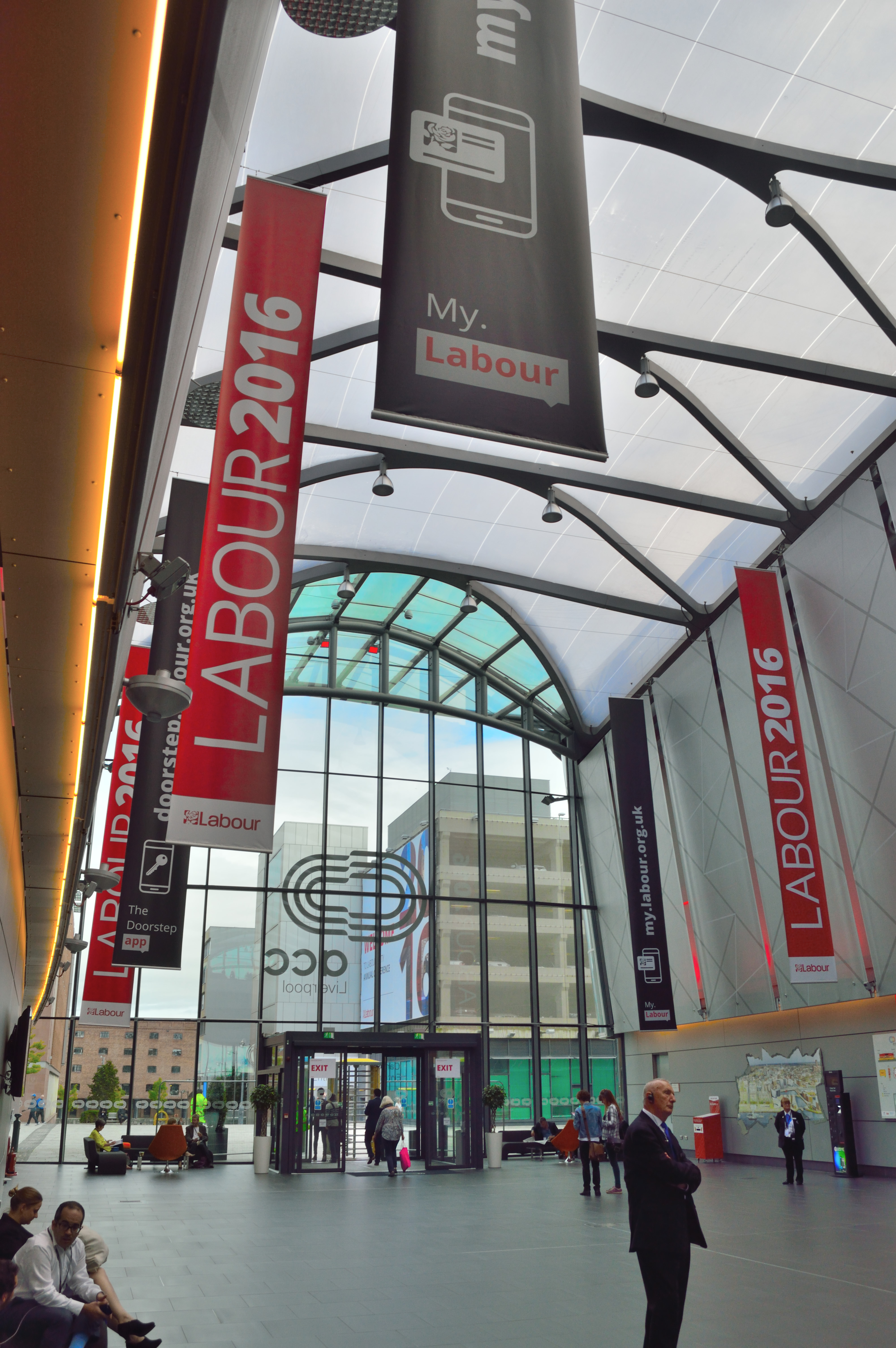
Labour Conference at ACC Liverpool

The dates and locations of the 2016 conferences were as follows:

- Green Party of England and Wales – Friday 2 September to Sunday 4 September 2016 at the University of Birmingham
- UKIP – Thursday 15 to Saturday 17 September at the Bournemouth International Centre, Bournemouth
- Liberal Democrats – Saturday 17 September to Tuesday 20 September at the Brighton Centre, Brighton
- Labour – Sunday 25 September to Wednesday 28 September 2016 at the ACC Liverpool, Liverpool
- Conservatives – Sunday 2 to Wednesday 5 October at International Convention Centre, Birmingham
- Scottish National Party – Thursday 13 to Saturday 15 October at the Scottish Exhibition and Conference Centre, Glasgow
- Plaid Cymru – Friday 21 to Saturday 22 October at the Pavilion, Llangollen
- Scottish Green Party – Friday 21 to Sunday 23 October at Perth Concert Hall and the Royal George Hotel, Perth

== 2015 conference season ==
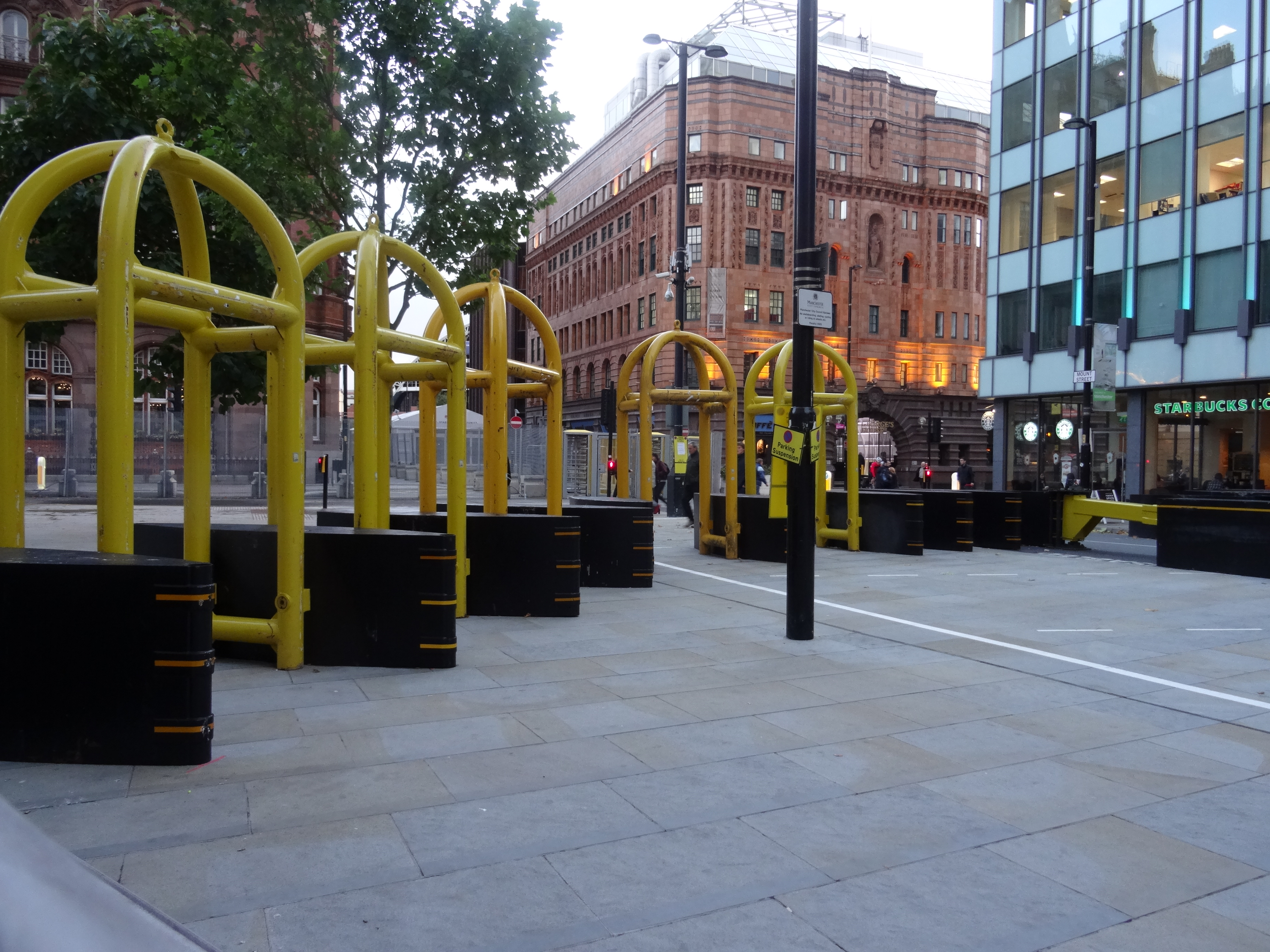
Temporary fences in Manchester during the Conservatives conference

The dates and locations of the 2015 conferences were as follows:

Party	Venue	City/Town	Country	Date
Liberal Democrats (UK)	Bournemouth International Centre	Bournemouth	England	19–23 September
UK Independence Party	Doncaster Racecourse	Doncaster	England	24–26 September
Green Party of England and Wales	Bournemouth International Centre	Bournemouth	England	25–28 September
Labour Party (UK)	Brighton Centre	Brighton	England	27–30 September
Conservative Party (UK)	Manchester Central	Manchester	England	4 October – 7 October
Scottish Green Party	Clyde Auditorium	Glasgow	Scotland	10 October – 11 October
Scottish National Party	Aberdeen Exhibition and Conference Centre	Aberdeen	Scotland	15 October – 17 October
Plaid Cymru	Aberystwyth Arts Centre	Aberystwyth	Wales	23 October – 24 October

== 2014 conference season ==
The dates of the 2014 conferences were as follows:

- Green Party of England and Wales – 5 to 8 September, at Aston University, Birmingham
- Trades Union Congress – 7 to 10 September, in Liverpool
- Labour – 21 to 24 September, in Manchester
- UKIP – 26 to 27 September, in Doncaster
- Official Monster Raving Loony Party – 26th, 27th & 28th Sept, in Llandrindod Wells, Powys
- Conservatives – 28 September to 1 October, in Birmingham
- Liberal Democrats – 4 to 8 October, in Glasgow
- Scottish Green Party – 11 to 12 October, in Edinburgh
- Plaid Cymru – 24 to 25 October, in Aberystwyth
- Scottish National Party – 13 to 15 November, in Perth

At their annual conference, the Scottish National Party held a leadership election following Alex Salmond's announcement of resignation. Nicola Sturgeon, formerly Salmond's deputy, was elected as their new leader.

== 2013 conference season ==
The dates of the 2013 conferences were as follows:

- Trades Union Congress – 8 to 11 September, in Bournemouth
- Green Party of England and Wales – 13 to 16 September, in Brighton
- Liberal Democrats – 14 to 18 September, in Glasgow
- UKIP – 20 to 21 September, in London
- Labour- 22 to 25 September, in Brighton
- Conservatives – 29 September to 2 October, in Manchester
- Plaid Cymru – 11 to 12 October, in Aberystwyth
- Scottish National Party – 17 to 20 October, in Perth

== 2012 conference season ==
The dates of the 2012 conferences were as follows:

- Green Party of England and Wales – 7 to 10 September, in Bristol
- Trades Union Congress – 9 to 12 September, in Brighton
- Plaid Cymru – 13 to 15 September, in Brecon
- UKIP – 21 to 22 September, in Birmingham
- Liberal Democrats – 22 to 26 September, in Brighton
- Labour- 30 September to 4 October, in Manchester
- Conservatives – 8 to 11 October, in Birmingham
- Scottish National Party – 18 to 21 October, in Perth

== See also ==
- Conservative Party Conference
- Labour Party Conference
- Liberal Democrat Federal Conference
