= Conservative Party Conference =

Annual national conference of the British Conservative Party

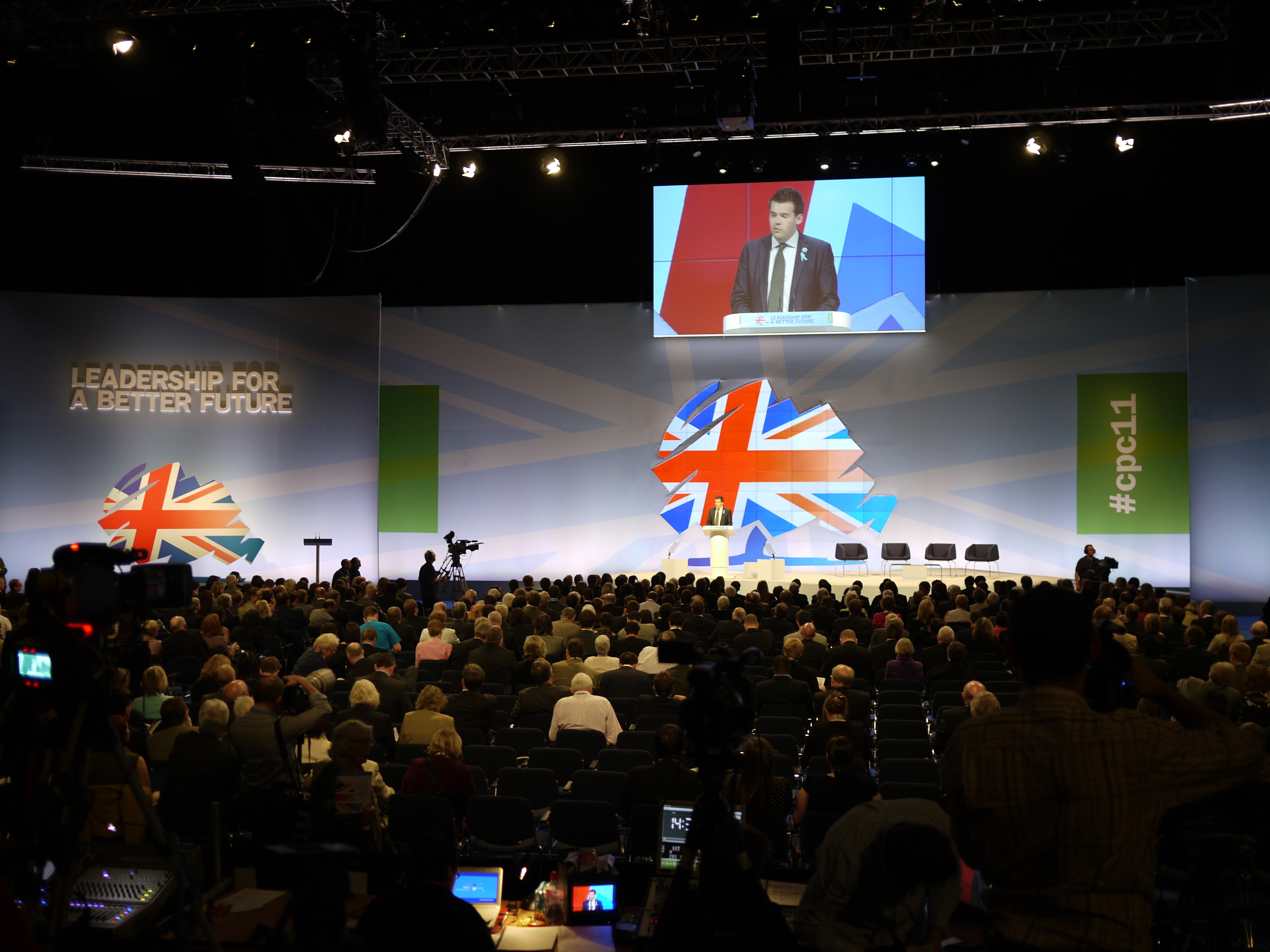
Conservative Party Conference held in Manchester at the Central Convention Complex in 2011

The Conservative Party Conference (CPC) is a four-day national conference event held by the Conservative Party in the United Kingdom. It takes place every year in October during the British party conference season, when the House of Commons is usually in recess. The event's location has alternated between Birmingham's International Convention Centre (ICC) and Manchester's Central Convention Complex since 2008. Previously, it had alternated between Blackpool, Bournemouth and Brighton. In contrast to the Liberal Democrat Conference, where every party member attending its Conference, either in-person or online, has the right to vote on party policy, under a one-member, one vote system, or the Labour Party Conference, where 50% of votes are allocated to affiliated organisations (such as trade unions), and in which all voting is restricted to nominated representatives (known as delegates), the Conservative Party Conference does not hold votes on party policy.

The conference, which consists of fringe events, receptions, and speeches, gives Conservative Party members, the press, and the public a chance to learn about the party's ideas and policies for the year ahead. The focal event is the leader's speech, which is given by the incumbent Leader of the Conservative Party at the end of conference. In some special circumstances, the leader will make a speech at the opening of conference. An exhibition area is also featured every year allowing businesses and Conservative Party-affiliated organisations to promote their brands and messages from exhibition stands throughout the conference period.

The chairman of the Conservative Party Conference is always the current president of the National Conservative Convention, the parliament of the Voluntary Party. The National Convention meets twice a year—its Annual General Meeting is usually held at Spring Forum, with another meeting usually held at the Party Conference. Since 2017, the Democratic Unionist Party has hosted an annual reception at the conference, owing to the alliance between the two parties in the 2017–2019 parliament.

== Conferences ==
=== Winston Churchill leadership ===
==== Margate, 1953 ====
The 1953 conference took place in Margate. Winston Churchill's speech took place on 10 October. He had recovered from an acute stroke in June of the same year; Anthony Eden wrote in his diary that Churchill intended to use his speech at the conference to "try himself out," before he returned to work in Parliament. He had initially written an hour long speech of 4000 words, but reduced this to 50 minutes following advice from his doctor Charles Wilson, 1st Baron Moran, who also prescribed him either Edrisal or Drinamyl tablets. He was also given throat spray before the speech.

=== Edward Heath leadership ===
==== Blackpool, 1977 ====
At the 1977 conference, 16-year-old William Hague made a speech, stating that young people like himself wanted to see taxes cut, union power curbed and the frontiers of the state rolled back.

=== Margaret Thatcher leadership ===
==== Brighton, 1980 ====
The 1980 conference was headed by Margaret Thatcher in Brighton. Her speech on 10 October included the line “you turn if you want to. The lady's not for turning!”

==== Brighton, 1984 ====
During the 1984 conference, held in Brighton, the Provisional Irish Republican Army targeted the government in a hotel bombing on 12 October. While it did not kill any Cabinet members, it killed five people and injured thirty four. Despite this, Thatcher insisted the conference begin at 9:30 a.m., and in her speech she stated "this attack has failed. All attempts to destroy democracy by terrorism will fail."

=== John Major leadership ===
==== Brighton, 1992 ====
The 1992 conference followed a surprise victory in the 1992 general election. In his speech which promised that the government’s welfare reforms would stop benefit fraud, social security secretary Peter Lilley adapted the “little list” song from Gilbert and Sullivan’s “The Mikado.”

==== 1993 ====
John Major spoke about returning "back to basics", and called for a return to "decency" and "courtesy" in his speech at the 1993 conference.

==== Blackpool, 1995 ====
The Conservatives were projected to lose the next election in 1995. In his speech at the 1995 conference, defense secretary and leadership hopeful Michael Portillo said in his speech that "The SAS has a famous motto: Who dares wins. We will dare, we will win.” This was disliked by the wider public, and Portillo later said the reference "was ill-judged". The Conservatives later lost the 1997 election and Portillo lost his seat.

=== Iain Duncan Smith leadership ===
==== Blackpool, 2003 ====
At the 2003 conference in Blackpool, party leader Iain Duncan Smith stated in his speech; "to the prime minister, I say this: the quiet man is here to stay, and he's turning up the volume!" This line was not successful.

=== David Cameron leadership ===
==== Manchester, 2015 ====
Prime Minister David Cameron headed the 2015 conference in Manchester. On its opening day, a protest of up to 60 thousand anti-austerity protestors marched in Manchester, with a small group of protesters egging a young Conservative member attending the event. Party chairman Andrew Feldman had emailed members to remove their Conservative Party branded identification badges when outside the venue.

Theresa May made her speech on 6 October, and Cameron made his speech on 7 October. During his speech, he attacked Labour for not helping working people, labelled Jeremy Corbyn as soft on ISIS and Osama bin Laden, addressed a "refugee crisis," and made a defence of EU membership.

=== Theresa May leadership ===
==== Birmingham, 2016 ====
At the 2016 conference in Birmingham, Prime Minister Theresa May addressed the conference on its opening day in her speech "Global Britain: Making a success of Brexit."

==== Manchester, 2017 ====
At the 2017 conference in Manchester, May suffered from a combination of a prankster handing her a P45, Philip Hammond giving her a lozenge for a hacking cough, and a letter on the set falling off behind her during her speech.

==== Birmingham, 2018 ====
At the 2018 conference, May danced onto the stage for her speech on 3 October to ABBA's "Dancing Queen" in reference to her previous dancing during a visit to South Africa, and also made reference to the letter that had fallen from the backdrop at the 2017 event. During the speech, she made several policy pledges including the end of austerity, lifting caps on local authorities borrowing to build new council houses, setting new targets for early cancer detection and continuing the freeze on fuel duty.

Kong Linlin, a Chinese state journalist with CCTV+, was charged with common assault after an incident at the conference during an event on the “erosion of freedom” of Hong Kong; the case was discontinued on the advice of the Crown Prosecution Service and the Embassy of China in London commented on the incident. An app developed for the conference, announced by party chairman Brandon Lewis as "the first 'interactive' conference app", led to leaks of members' phone numbers including that of Boris Johnson.

=== Boris Johnson leadership ===
==== Manchester, 2019 ====
The 2019 conference was held in Manchester. Parliament voted to reject the government's request for the traditional three-day parliamentary "conference recess" by a margin of 17 votes due to opposition parties refusing to back any suspension of parliament until the potential no-deal Brexit on 31 October was averted, meaning that the conference clashed with the sitting of Parliament for the first time.

At the conference, on 1 October, Conservative MP Geoffrey Clifton-Brown was removed from the event after attempting to bring a person without a relevant pass into the lounge and arguing with a member of staff.

Boris Johnson's speech at the conference had Brexit as a central focus. During the speech, he stated that "we will under no circumstances have checks at or near the border in Northern Ireland. We will respect the peace process and the Good Friday Agreement." He suggested that his proposal for a Brexit deal represented a compromise from the government to the EU, and that the alternative would be a no deal Brexit, stating that Parliament "refuses to deliver Brexit, refuses to do anything constructive and refuses to have an election." He called Labour a party of "fratricidal antisemitic Marxists".

==== Birmingham, 2020 ====
The 2020 conference was initially intended to be held in Birmingham. In July 2020, the party announced that it would be held in an online format due to the COVID-19 pandemic, with key events livestreamed.

Johnson's speech was held on 6 October. During the speech, he refuted rumours concerning his health, stated he would "fix the injustice of care home funding," and "fix our broken housing market."

==== Manchester, 2021 ====
The 2021 conference, held in Manchester, was also headed by Johnson. David Frost told the conference that Britain would trigger Article 16 safeguard measures in the Northern Ireland Protocol if the European Union failed to agree to changes to smooth trade with Northern Ireland. Iain Duncan Smith was allegedly assaulted on the way to the conference by a group of five protesters using a traffic cone. Two Windrush campaigners were refused access to the conference on 4 October due to concerns that they may protest in the venue.

In his speech on 6 October, Johnson announced fewer policies than usual, instead signalling a new philosophy in response to supply chain problems and labour shortages.

=== Liz Truss leadership ===
==== Birmingham, 2022 ====
Liz Truss' speech at the 2022 conference at the ICC Birmingham lasted 35 minutes, shorter than usual for speeches by party leaders at the conference. During the speech, she stated that she would bring the country through "stormy days" and oppose the "anti-growth coalition," which she said included opposition parties, unions and environmental campaigners. The speech was interrupted by Greenpeace protesters.

Mel B appeared at the conference to appeal for support for domestic abuse victims.

=== Rishi Sunak leadership ===
==== Manchester, 2023 ====
The 2023 conference was held in Manchester from 1 to 4 October, and was the first to be held with Rishi Sunak as leader of the party. Prior to the event in July 2023, conference organisers dropped plans to charge journalists £137 each to attend, following a letter to the party signed by news organisations protesting the change. In September, the Associated Society of Locomotive Engineers and Firemen announced train driver strikes targeting the conference on September 30 and October 4, as well as a ban on drivers' overtime work on September 29, and between October 2 and October 6.

Discussion of the Manchester leg of the High Speed 2 (HS2) railway was prevalent in the conference due to leaks that its cancellation was under review. A speech by former party leader Liz Truss on 2 October, described by The New York Times as "well-attended", argued that corporation tax should be cut. During a speech by Suella Braverman, elected Conservative London Assembly member and LGBT+ Conservatives patron Andrew Boff was removed from the conference by security staff and had his pass withdrawn after interrupting the speech by stating that "there's no such thing as gender ideology", after Braverman had described "gender ideology" as "poison". Boff said that "trash about gender ideology is making our Conservative Party look transphobic and homophobic." Nigel Farage attended the conference for the first time since 1988, prompting consideration on whether he would re-join the party.

Sunak's speech took place on 4 October, and was an hour long. He announced the cancellation of the West Midlands to Manchester leg of HS2, stating that "the facts have changed." He also announced that £4 billion in funding would be reallocated from the railway to other transport schemes in six northern city regions, and confirmed that the planned HS2 line would run into Euston railway station. Sunak also announced plans to scrap A-levels and replace them with an "Advanced British Standard" qualification. He also positioned himself against gender self-identification, stating "a man is a man, and a woman is a woman".

==== Birmingham, 2024 ====
The 2024 conference was held in Birmingham from 29 September to 2 October, and followed the defeat of the Conservative Party at the general election of July 2024, and the resignation of Rishi Sunak as the party leader. The conference was used by leadership hopefuls in the 2024 Conservative Party leadership election as a 'beauty parade' for the candidates.

=== Kemi Badenoch leadership ===
==== Manchester, 2025 ====
The 2025 conference was held in Manchester from 5 to 8 October, and was the first to be held with Kemi Badenoch as leader of the party.

== See also ==
- Labour Party Conference
- Liberal Democrat Conference
- Party conference season
