= 2022 in England =

- Centuries: 19th; 20th; 21st
- Decades: 2000s; 2010s; 2020s
- See also: 2021–22 in English football 2022–23 in English football 2022 in the United Kingdom; Other events of 2022

Events of 2022 in England. The Queen's platinum jubilee took place in February; she died in September. England's hottest temperatures on record occurred in July.

== Incumbent ==
- Monarch - Elizabeth II (until 8 September), Charles III (from 8 September)
- Prime Minister
  - Boris Johnson (until 6 September),
  - Liz Truss (from 6 September to 25 October),
  - Rishi Sunak (from 25 October)

== Events ==
=== January ===
- 1 January – The warmest New Year's Day on record is reported, with temperatures of 16.2 °C (61.2 °F) in St James's Park, central London.
- 16 January – Two teenagers are arrested in Manchester as part of the investigation into a hostage-taking incident at a synagogue in Colleyville, Texas, United States.
- 24 January – Yasmin Chkaifi is stabbed to death in the street by her former partner, Leon McCaskre, in Maida Vale, London. He is killed by another man at the scene.

=== February ===
- 9 February – Ian Stewart, already convicted of the murder of children's author Helen Bailey, is sentenced to a whole-life order for the killing of his previous wife, Diane Stewart, six years earlier.
- 12 February – 13 people are injured, three seriously, when a mezzanine floor collapses at an East London pub.
- 27 February –
  - The FA announces that the England national football team will not play against Russia (at any level, age or gender) for the foreseeable future.
  - Liverpool wins the 2022 EFL Cup Final, defeating Chelsea 11–10 on penalties following a 0–0 draw after extra time. This is Liverpool's 9th League Cup trophy.

=== April ===
- 8 April – Koci Selamaj is jailed for life, with a minimum term of 36 years, for the murder of primary school teacher Sabina Nessa in south-east London in September 2021.
- 15 April – Several road bridges in central London, including Waterloo, Blackfriars and Westminster, are blocked by Extinction Rebellion activists.
- 23 April – Ospreys nesting in Poole Harbour, Dorset, produce an egg, the first in Southern England in modern times.
- 25 April – Three women and a man are found stabbed to death in a house in Bermondsey, south-east London. A man is arrested at the scene on suspicion of murder.

=== May ===
- 21 May – Five people are injured after parts of spectator stands collapse during a rehearsal for the Trooping the Colour ceremony at Horse Guards Parade in central London.
- 24 May – The Elizabeth line opens in London.
- 28 May – Police declare a major incident after a superyacht catches fire and later sinks at Princess Pier in Torquay, Devon.
- 30 May – A 3.8 magnitude earthquake is recorded in Shropshire, with its epicentre at Wem in the north of the county.
- 31 May – Bradford is named the 2025 UK City of Culture.

=== June ===
- 16 June – England's hospital waiting list reaches a new record high of 6.5 million people.
- 18 June – Thousands of protesters march through London to demand action from the government on the cost of living crisis.
- 22 June – The UK Health Security Agency declares a national incident after poliovirus is found in sewage samples collected from the Beckton Sewage Treatment Works, East London.
- 26 June
  - A suspected gas explosion destroys a house in Kingstanding, Birmingham.
  - Murder of Zara Aleena

=== July ===
- 12 July – A report from a three-year inquiry into the child sexual exploitation in Telford, Shropshire, is released. It reveals more than 1,000 girls had been abused over a 40 year period, and that agencies blamed victims for the abuse they suffered, not the perpetrators, and exploitation was not investigated because of "nervousness about race" in the belief that investigation against Asian men would inflame "racial tensions". The report makes 47 recommendations for improvement by agencies involved. West Mercia Police apologise "unequivocally" for past events, as well as Telford and Wrekin Council. Victims were often blamed for "child prostitution" and offenders were emboldened by the lack of police action.
- 17 July – The UK government confirms that every state school in England will have a defibrillator by summer 2023.
- 18 July – Wild bison are reintroduced in the UK for the first time in thousands of years. Three of the animals are allowed to roam in the Kent countryside, where it is hoped they could improve the local ecology.
- 19 July – 2022 United Kingdom heat waves: A major incident is declared in London, with more than 250 firefighters battling grassfires in the east and south of the capital. As a result, London Fire Brigade has its busiest day since World War Two.
- 24 July – A major incident is declared in Surrey as a wildfire breaks out on Hankley Common, burning at least 8 hectares (20 acres) of land.
- 31 July – England win UEFA Women's Euro 2022, beating Germany 2–1; the winning goals are scored by Ella Toone and Chloe Kelly. It is England's first major football victory since the 1966 men's FIFA world cup.

=== August ===
- 3 August –
  - As a prolonged dry spell continues in Southern England, a hosepipe ban is announced for Kent and Sussex from 12 August.
  - BBC Birmingham announces it will move into new premises built at the former Typhoo tea factory in the city's Digbeth area, with a date of 2026 set for the move.
- 5 August – A large fire breaks out at an industrial site in Ranskill, in which over a thousand tyres created a large black smoke cloud.
- 8 August –
  - A child is killed and three people are hospitalised with life-threatening injuries after a gas explosion destroys a house in Thornton Heath, South London. Around 40 properties in the immediate vicinity are evacuated, as police begin an investigation.
  - England finish the 2022 Commonwealth Games in second place behind Australia with 176 medals, 97 of them gold, surpassing their 2014 total of 174.
- 9 August – Thames Water announces plans to introduce a hosepipe ban for its 15 million customers, with a start date to be confirmed.
- 10 August – A meeting of the Joint Committee on Vaccination and Immunisation recommends an urgent polio vaccine booster campaign for children aged one to nine in London, following detection of the virus in 116 samples of wastewater.
- 12 August – A drought is declared in large parts of Central, Southern and Eastern England.
- 14 August –
  - The Crown Prosecution Service confirms that six people who were charged with breaching lockdown rules after attending demonstrations in the wake of the March 2021 murder of Sarah Everard will not be prosecuted.
  - The Sunday Times reports that regulated rail fares in England will rise below the rate of inflation in 2023 to help commuters struggling with the cost of living crisis. The rise will also be delayed until March rather than the usual January increase.
- 16 August – NHS England confirms it is extending its bowel cancer screening programme to all adults over the age of 58.
- 22 August - Killing of Olivia Pratt-Korbel
- 23 August – A drought is declared in the West Midlands.
- 30 August – A drought is declared in South West England, covering Bristol, Somerset, South Gloucestershire, Dorset and parts of Wiltshire.

=== September ===
- 8 September – Elizabeth II dies after a 70 year reign, the longest of any British monarch.

=== October ===
- 24 October – Bond Street station opens to the Elizabeth line in a ceremony by Mayor of London Sadiq Khan.
- 30 October – Dover firebomb attack

=== November ===
- 25 November - Danville Neil is sentenced to life for the 1993 murders of Anne Castle and William Bryan.

=== December ===
- 1 December – 2022 City of Chester by-election
- 14 December
  - 2022 Stretford and Urmston by-election
  - Jordan McSweeney is convicted of the murder of Zara Aleena
- 24 December – Wallasey pub shooting

== See also ==
- 2022 in Northern Ireland
- 2022 in Scotland
- 2022 in Wales
- 2022 United Kingdom electoral calendar
