= 2022 in the United Kingdom =

Events from the year 2022 in the United Kingdom.

This year saw Boris Johnson resign as prime minister and leader of the Conservative Party, with Liz Truss being elected as his successor in September, before resigning in October and being succeeded by Rishi Sunak. After 70 years on the throne, marked by her Platinum Jubilee celebrations in June, Queen Elizabeth II died on 8 September at the age of 96. The Queen was succeeded by her son, Prince Charles. Other significant events of the year included the UK's response to the Russian invasion of Ukraine, a record-breaking 40°C heatwave during the summer and nearly 25,000 wildfires, and a cost of living crisis marked by high inflation and rising energy bills.

== Incumbents ==
- Monarch
  - Elizabeth II (until 8 September)
  - Charles III (starting 8 September)
- Prime Minister
  - Boris Johnson (Conservative) (until 6 September)
  - Liz Truss (Conservative) (6 September – 25 October)
  - Rishi Sunak (Conservative) (starting 25 October)

== Events ==
=== January ===
- 1 January – The warmest New Year's Day on record is reported, with temperatures of 16.2 °C (61.2 °F) in St James's Park, Central London.
- 3 January – COVID-19 in the UK: A critical incident is declared at several hospitals in Lincolnshire after the increased spread of COVID-19 causes "extreme and unprecedented" staff shortages.
- 4 January – COVID-19 in the UK: The daily infection number exceeds 200,000 for the first time, with a total of 218,724 cases, partly caused by a backlog in reporting over the New Year.
- 5 January – Four defendants (known as 'the Colston 4') accused of pulling down the Statue of Edward Colston in Bristol in June 2020 as part of the Black Lives Matter protests are found not guilty of criminal damage in a jury trial.
- 6 January – COVID-19 in the UK: A survey by the Office for National Statistics (ONS) reveals that 1.3 million people in the UK are living with long COVID, about 506,000 (40%) of whom caught the virus over a year ago, and still have symptoms such as fatigue, loss of smell, shortness of breath, and difficulty concentrating.
- 8 January – COVID-19 in the UK: The number of deaths within 28 days of a positive Covid test exceeds 150,000.
- 10 January – The Met Police contacts the government over "widespread reporting relating to alleged breaches" of Covid rules, following an email obtained by ITV News dated 20 May 2020, in which 100 people were invited to a "bring-your-own-booze" event in the Downing Street garden during the first lockdown. Boris Johnson declines to say whether he was among those there.
- 12 January
  - The High Court rules that the government's use of a "VIP lane" to award contracts for personal protective equipment (PPE) to two companies was unlawful.
  - At Prime Minister's Questions, Johnson confirms he did attend a party in the No 10 garden during the first lockdown in May 2020 and offers his "heartfelt apology". Opposition MPs and the leader of the Scottish Conservatives Douglas Ross call for his resignation.
  - Prince Andrew fails in his bid to dismiss a US civil sex assault case brought against him by Virginia Giuffre.
- 13 January
  - MI5 warns that a Chinese spy, who they identify as Christine Ching Kui Lee, has been active in the British Parliament.
  - Prince Andrew's military affiliations and royal patronages, which includes the use of "His Royal Highness", are returned to the Queen. It is announced that he will defend the Giuffre lawsuit as a "private citizen".
- 14 January
  - The Daily Telegraph reports that two parties were held at Downing Street the night before Prince Philip's funeral, at a time when Covid restrictions banned indoor mixing. Downing Street issues an apology to the Queen.
  - The Daily Telegraph also reports that Kate Josephs, who was the head of the Covid taskforce, was given a leaving do on 17 December 2020. Josephs apologises for the event, saying she is 'truly sorry.'
  - Tortoise Media reports Boris Johnson commuted between Downing Street and his second home, Chequers, between 16 and 27 March 2020, when non-essential travel was banned. This is confirmed by Downing Street.
  - The Daily Mirror reports that Number 10 staff had 'wine-time Fridays' throughout the pandemic, with pictures of a wine fridge bought especially for it being released alongside the story.
- 17 January
  - GB News announces it will play God Save the Queen at the start of live programming every day.
  - A 50-year-old woman from Brighton is reported among the fatalities in the Hunga Tonga eruption and tsunami.
- 19 January
  - Inflation reaches 5.4%, the highest level since March 1992.
  - Conservative MP Christian Wakeford defects to Labour, after submitting a letter of no confidence in Boris Johnson in light of the "partygate" scandal.
- 20 January
  - Conservative MP William Wragg accuses whips of blackmail against Conservative MPs who are believed to support the ousting of Johnson. The Speaker, Sir Lindsay Hoyle, tells the Commons that potentially criminal offences would be a matter for the police. A Downing Street spokesperson says: "We are not aware of any evidence to support what are clearly serious allegations."
  - 30 elite British troops are sent to Ukraine amid fears of an imminent Russian invasion. The troops deliver 2,000 NLAW anti-tank missile launchers to Ukrainian forces to bolster their defences.
- 21 January – COVID-19 in the UK: The UK Health Security Agency formally designates BA.2 as a "variant under investigation".
- 24 January
  - Johnson orders an inquiry into allegations by Conservative MP Nus Ghani that she was dismissed as a minister after being told her "Muslim-ness" was "making colleagues uncomfortable".
  - Conservative peer Lord Agnew publicly resigns in the House of Lords after criticising the government's handling of fraudulent Covid business loans.
  - ITV News reports that Johnson attended a party to celebrate his 56th birthday on 20 June 2020, despite Covid rules forbidding social gatherings indoors at the time.
  - Yasmin Chkaifi, 43, is stabbed to death in Maida Vale, West London.
- 25 January – At a London Assembly committee meeting, Cressida Dick confirms that the Metropolitan Police are now investigating "potential breaches of Covid-19 regulations" in Downing Street and Whitehall since 2020, as a "result of the information provided by the Cabinet Office inquiry team", led by Sue Gray.
- 27 January – COVID-19 in the UK: The government's "Plan B" restrictions in England come to an end, meaning that face masks and COVID passes are no longer legally required.
- 29 January – Storm Malik hits the UK, killing a 9-year-old boy and a 60-year-old woman and leaving tens of thousands of homes in Scotland and England without power.
- 30 January – Manchester United footballer Mason Greenwood is arrested on suspicion of raping and assaulting his girlfriend. The club suspends him "until further notice".
- 31 January – The initial findings of a report by Sue Gray into Downing Street parties are published. She notes that, "At least some of the gatherings in question represent a serious failure to observe not just the high standards expected of those working at the heart of Government but also of the standards expected of the entire British population at the time," and concludes that "a number of these gatherings should not have been allowed to take place or to develop in the way that they did. There is significant learning to be drawn from these events which must be addressed immediately across Government."

=== February ===
- 1 February – Johnson travels to Kyiv for talks with President Zelensky, amid rising concerns over the Russo-Ukrainian crisis.
- 2 February
  - The government publishes a white paper on its "levelling up" strategy, which aims to reduce the gap between rich and poor parts of the country by 2030. This includes a 40% increase in research and development spending for the North, Midlands, South West, Scotland, Wales, and Northern Ireland.
  - COVID-19 in the UK: 534 coronavirus-related deaths are reported, the highest daily figure since February 2021.
- 3 February
  - Ofgem announces a lifting of the energy price cap from £1,277 to £1,971, an increase of 54%. The regulator estimates that nearly 18 million households in England, Wales and Scotland will pay an average of £693 extra a year for gas and electricity.
  - The Bank of England raises the interest rate from 0.25 to 0.5%, in a bid to restrain inflation.
  - Munira Mirza resigns as Director of the Number 10 Policy Unit, saying it was in protest at Johnson's comments about Keir Starmer being responsible for the failure to prosecute serial sex offender Jimmy Savile. Three other senior aides resign hours later – Director of Communications Jack Doyle, Chief of Staff Dan Rosenfield, and principal private secretary to the prime minister Martin Reynolds.
  - Paul Givan resigns as First Minister of Northern Ireland in protest over Brexit checks in the Irish Sea, which are part of the Northern Ireland protocol.
  - The 2022 Southend West by-election, following the murder of Sir David Amess, is won by the Conservative candidate, Anna Firth. The by-election is not contested by the major opposition parties out of respect for Amess.
- 4 February
  - Policy adviser Elena Narozanski becomes the fifth of Johnson's aides to resign within 24 hours.
  - Peer Nazir Ahmed is jailed for sexual offences against children.
- 6 February – The Platinum Jubilee of Queen Elizabeth II marks the 70th anniversary of her accession to the throne as Queen of the United Kingdom.
- 7 February
  - The football associations of the four nations of the United Kingdom and Ireland announce they have agreed not to bid for the 2030 World Cup, and will instead attempt a joint bid to host Euro 2028.
  - Footage emerges of West Ham United player Kurt Zouma kicking and punching his pet cat. Essex Police announce they are liaising with the RSPCA and "urgent enquiries are ongoing".
  - Police arrest two people after protesters shouting "traitor" surround Keir Starmer in Westminster.
- 8 February
  - In the Commons, Speaker Lindsay Hoyle condemns the abuse of Starmer, while Shadow Foreign Secretary David Lammy links the incident to Johnson's recent comments. Hoyle tells MPs: "Those sorts of comments only inflame opinions and generate disregard for the house and it is not acceptable. Our words have consequences. And we should always be mindful of that fact."
  - Johnson implements a cabinet reshuffle, which includes Jacob Rees-Mogg becoming Minister of State for Brexit Opportunities and Government Efficiency, with Mark Spencer replacing him as Leader of the House.
  - Health Secretary Sajid Javid sets out the government's plans to reduce the NHS backlog resulting from the pandemic, including new facilities paid for by an extra £8bn of investment over the next three years.
- 9 February
  - Ian Stewart, already convicted for the murder of children's author Helen Bailey, is sentenced to a whole-life order for the killing of his previous wife, Diane Stewart, six years earlier.
  - The UK's terror threat level is lowered from severe to substantial, meaning a terror attack on British soil is considered "likely".
  - Partygate: Another new photo of Johnson is leaked, this time appearing to show him next to a bottle of champagne, with a tinsel-wearing official and other staff members, apparently taken on 15 December 2020.
  - The biggest breakthrough in fusion energy since 1997 is reported by Oxford's JET lab, with 59 megajoules produced over five seconds (11 megawatts of power), more than double the previous record.
- 10 February
  - Foreign Secretary Liz Truss meets her Russian counterpart in Moscow, Sergey Lavrov. Her visit, the first by a UK foreign secretary in four years, sees her urge Russia to "respect the sovereignty and territorial integrity of Ukraine".
  - At a visit to NATO in Brussels, Boris Johnson says that Europe faces "the most dangerous moment" in its "biggest security crisis" for decades. He tells reporters that he hopes "strong deterrence" and "patient diplomacy" can solve the crisis, but the stakes are "very high".
  - Cressida Dick stands down as Met police commissioner after losing the confidence of Sadiq Khan, the mayor of London, hours after stating she had no intention of resigning.
- 11 February
  - The UK records its fastest economic growth since 1941, with new figures showing a 7.5% rise in GDP during 2021. However, this follows the collapse of 9.4% during 2020.
  - The Foreign Office advises UK nationals to leave Ukraine.
- 13 February – Defence Secretary Ben Wallace tells the Sunday Times that Russia is now "highly likely" to invade Ukraine and says there is a "whiff of Munich in the air", a reference to the appeasement of Germany during the late 1930s.
- 14 February – An inquiry begins into the Post Office scandal, the most widespread miscarriage of justice in British legal history.
- 15 February – Prince Andrew and Virginia Giuffre reach an out-of-court settlement over her civil sex assault claim.
- 16 February
  - Inflation increases to 5.5% according to Office for National Statistics (ONS) figures.
  - Storm Dudley hits Scotland, England, and Northern Ireland, bringing widespread disruption.
- 17 February – The Met Office issues a rare red weather alert for parts of South West England and Wales ahead of the onset of Storm Eunice the following day.
- 18 February – Storm Eunice becomes one of the most powerful storms to hit the UK in decades, which includes the fastest wind gusts ever recorded in England, blowing at 122 miles per hour (196 km/h) on the Isle of Wight. Millions of people are urged to avoid travel and to stay indoors, with red weather alerts extended to southern and eastern England, and for the first time London. Three people are killed, and widespread damage is reported, which includes the iconic O2 Arena rooftop being partially blown away.
- 20 February – COVID-19 in the UK: The Queen tests positive for COVID-19. Buckingham Palace says she has "mild cold-like symptoms" but expects to continue "light duties" at Windsor over the coming week.
- 21 February
  - Storm Franklin becomes the third major storm to hit the UK in less than a week, bringing strong winds and widespread flooding.
  - COVID-19 in the UK: The Joint Committee on Vaccination and Immunisation (JCVI) recommends an additional booster dose be offered to all adults over-75 and the most vulnerable over-12s in the spring.
- 22 February – In response to Russia's incursion into Ukraine, the UK announces sanctions on five Russian banks and three individuals.
- 24 February
  - As Russia escalates to a full-scale invasion of Ukraine, Johnson condemns Putin and promises "a massive package of sanctions" that will "hobble the Russian economy".
  - The FTSE 100 and other markets around the world fall sharply, amid concerns over Russia and Ukraine. Oil prices exceed $100 a barrel for the first time since 2014.
- 25 February – All British airlines are banned by Russia from landing at its airports and from crossing its airspace, in response to the previous day's banning of Aeroflot from landing in the United Kingdom.
- 26 February
  - Chelsea F.C.'s Russian owner Roman Abramovich says he is "giving trustees of Chelsea's charitable foundation the stewardship and care" of the club.
  - The UK and its allies commit to removing Russian banks from the SWIFT payment system, as well as imposing measures on the Russian Central Bank and further restrictions on Russian elites.
- 27 February
  - Thousands of people gather in cities across the UK to show their support for Ukraine.
  - BP announces it will offload its 19.75% stake in Russian state-owned oil firm Rosneft after Russia's "act of aggression in Ukraine".
  - The FA announces that the England national football team will not play against Russia (at any level, age, men or women) for the foreseeable future.
  - Liverpool wins the 2022 EFL Cup Final, defeating Chelsea 11–10 on penalties following a 0–0 draw after extra time. This is Liverpool's 9th League Cup trophy.
- 28 February – The media regulator Ofcom launches 15 separate investigations into the Russian state-owned television news channel RT UK for its coverage of Russia's invasion of Ukraine.

=== March ===
- 1 March
  - Southend-on-Sea becomes a city.
  - 2021–22 Russo-Ukrainian crisis: Following criticism of the response to Ukrainian refugees, Johnson extends the government's visa scheme to allow potentially 200,000 people to stay in the UK.
- 3 March
  - 2021–22 Russo-Ukrainian crisis: Russia Today is removed from all broadcast platforms in the UK as part of a Europe-wide crackdown on Russian propaganda.
  - 2021–22 Russo-Ukrainian crisis: The UK announces sanctions against two more Russian oligarchs, Alisher Usmanov and Igor Shuvalov, following Russia's invasion of Ukraine.
  - 2022 Birmingham Erdington by-election: Paulette Hamilton wins the seat for Labour with 55.5% of the votes in a turnout of 27% of the electorate.
- 4 March – 2021–22 Russo-Ukrainian crisis: Two large tankers containing Russian gas, the Boris Vilkitsky and Fedor Litke, are prevented from unloading their cargos at the Grain LNG Terminal in Kent and are forced to go elsewhere. Similar action is undertaken by dockworkers at a Merseyside refinery who refuse to unload Russian oil.
- 10 March – 2021–22 Russo-Ukrainian crisis: Billionaire Roman Abramovich and six other Russian oligarchs are sanctioned by the government over their links to the Kremlin. Chelsea F.C. is left unable to sell tickets for football games, unable to buy or sell players on the transfer market, and unable to operate its merchandise shop.
- 12 March – COVID-19 in the UK: The death rate from COVID-19 in the UK is shown to be below the average for western Europe in an international comparison by The Lancet. The report also shows that the differences in excess deaths per 100,000 population between the UK, France, and Germany is not statistically significant.
- 13 March – Murder of Thomas Roberts in Bournemouth.
- 14 March
  - 2021–22 Russo-Ukrainian crisis: Squatters occupy the £50m Belgravia mansion of Russian oligarch Oleg Deripaska.
  - 2022 British barristers' industrial action: the Criminal Bar Association (CBA) in England and Wales vote to undertake industrial action protesting against stagnant fees, with 94 per cent of criminal barristers in favour.
- 15 March
  - 2021–22 Russo-Ukrainian crisis: Additional sanctions are announced, with an export ban on luxury goods to Russia, alongside a 35% import duty hike on £900m worth of products such as Russian vodka, metals, fertilisers and other commodities. All export finance support to both Russia and Belarus is also withdrawn, meaning the UK will no longer issue any new guarantees, loans, and insurance for exports to the countries.
  - A new T-shaped design of electricity pylon begins to be installed on the National Grid in England and Wales, the first new design since 1927.
- 16 March – Nazanin Zaghari-Ratcliffe, detained by Iran in 2016, is freed and allowed to return to the UK.
- 17 March
  - The Bank of England raises the interest rate from 0.5 to 0.75%, in a further bid to restrain inflation.
  - P&O Ferries abruptly suspends its services and makes 800 employees redundant in a video call, saying they are to be replaced by cheaper agency staff. The move prompts outrage from trade unions, as well as MPs on both sides of the House, as the government announces it will review its contracts with the company.
- 21 March
  - COVID-19 vaccination in the UK: A spring booster program begins in England, offering a fourth vaccine dose for over 75s and the most vulnerable.
  - At the Old Bailey, the trial begins of Ali Harbi Ali, 26, accused of murdering Conservative MP Sir David Amess in October 2021.
  - Nazanin Zaghari-Ratcliffe holds her first press conference, with husband Richard Ratcliffe and their MP, Tulip Siddiq, at Westminster. Siddiq calls for an inquiry by the foreign affairs committee into why her release took so long.
- 23 March
  - Inflation rises again, up from 5.5% the previous month to 6.2%.
  - The Chancellor, Rishi Sunak, delivers his Spring statement to the House, which includes a raising of the National Insurance threshold and a cut in fuel duty.
- 24 March – The Fixed-term Parliaments Act 2011 is repealed after the Dissolution and Calling of Parliament Act receives royal assent, meaning that the prime minister will again be able to request the monarch to dissolve Parliament and call an early election, with 25 working days' notice.
- 29 March – Partygate: The Met Police announces that 20 fixed penalty notices will be issued as part of the inquiry into Downing Street parties that allegedly breached Covid rules, but declines to say who the notices are being sent to or which events they relate.
- 30 March
  - A report by maternity expert Donna Ockenden into practices at Shrewsbury and Telford Hospital NHS Trust finds catastrophic failings that led to hundreds of baby and mother deaths over two decades. Health Secretary Sajid Javid tells the Commons that an active police investigation, Operation Lincoln, is looking at 600 cases.
  - Jamie Wallis comes out as the UK's first openly transgender MP.
- 31 March
  - Nationwide reports a 14.7% rise in house prices, the highest annual increase since 2004, with a typical UK home now costing £265,312.
  - COVID-19 in the UK: The provision of free lateral flow tests comes to an end in England.

=== April ===
- 1 April
  - The energy price cap for domestic gas and electricity in Great Britain rises by 54%, from £1,278 to £1,971. Bank of England governor Andrew Bailey warns that the country is facing the biggest single shock from energy prices since the 1970s. It is the largest increase, by far, in the price cap since it was introduced.
  - COVID-19 in the UK: The ONS Infection Survey reports that 4.9 million people in the UK currently have the virus, the highest figure since the pandemic began, driven by the Omicron BA.2 sub-variant and people mixing more.
- 2 April – COVID-19 vaccination in the UK: Low-dose vaccines for COVID-19 become available for children aged 5 to 11 in England, with five million eligible. A second dose is recommended after 12 weeks.
- 3 April – Conservative MP David Warburton is admitted to a psychiatric hospital, following his suspension from the parliamentary party amid allegations of sexual harassment and drug taking.
- 6 April
  - The rise in National Insurance comes into effect, adding an extra 1.25% in contributions paid by employees, businesses and the self-employed.
  - The biggest reform of divorce laws for 50 years comes into effect, ending the need for couples to first separate for two or more years and introducing a "no-fault" rule, bringing England and Wales into line with Scotland's laws. Lawyers predict a surge in divorce applications as a result of the change.
  - New rules requiring calorie information to be displayed on menus and food labels come into force.
  - COVID-19 in the UK: The final REACT study is published by Imperial College London, as the government withdraws funding as part of its "Living with Covid" strategy.
- 7 April
  - The government's plan to introduce a photo ID requirement for elections is defeated in the House of Lords by 199 votes to 170.
  - The government's new energy strategy is published, which includes a plan for eight new nuclear reactors and 95% of the UK's electricity coming from low-carbon sources by 2030.
- 8 April
  - Koci Selamaj is jailed for life, with a minimum term of 36 years, for the murder of primary school teacher Sabina Nessa in south-east London in September 2021.
  - The home secretary, Priti Patel, apologises for delays in accepting Ukrainian refugees, with only a quarter of the 41,000 granted visas having entered the UK so far.
  - Rishi Sunak's wife Akshata Murty announces she will pay UK taxes on her overseas income, following controversy over her non-dom status.
- 11 April
  - Ali Harbi Ali, a 26-year-old Islamic extremist, is found guilty of murdering Conservative MP Sir David Amess on 15 October 2021.
  - Conservative MP for Wakefield, Imran Ahmad Khan, is found guilty of sexually assaulting a 15-year-old boy in 2008 and is expelled from the party.
  - The 2022 British barristers' industrial action begins with nearly 2,500 participants.
- 12 April – Partygate: Boris Johnson, his wife Carrie Johnson, and Rishi Sunak are among those issued with fixed penalty notices for breaches of lockdown rules at gatherings in Whitehall and Downing Street. This makes Johnson the first sitting prime minister to be sanctioned for breaking the law. 30 more penalties are announced, in addition to the 20 given by police on 29 March. Johnson and Sunak apologise, but resist calls from opposition parties including Labour, the Liberal Democrats and the SNP to resign.
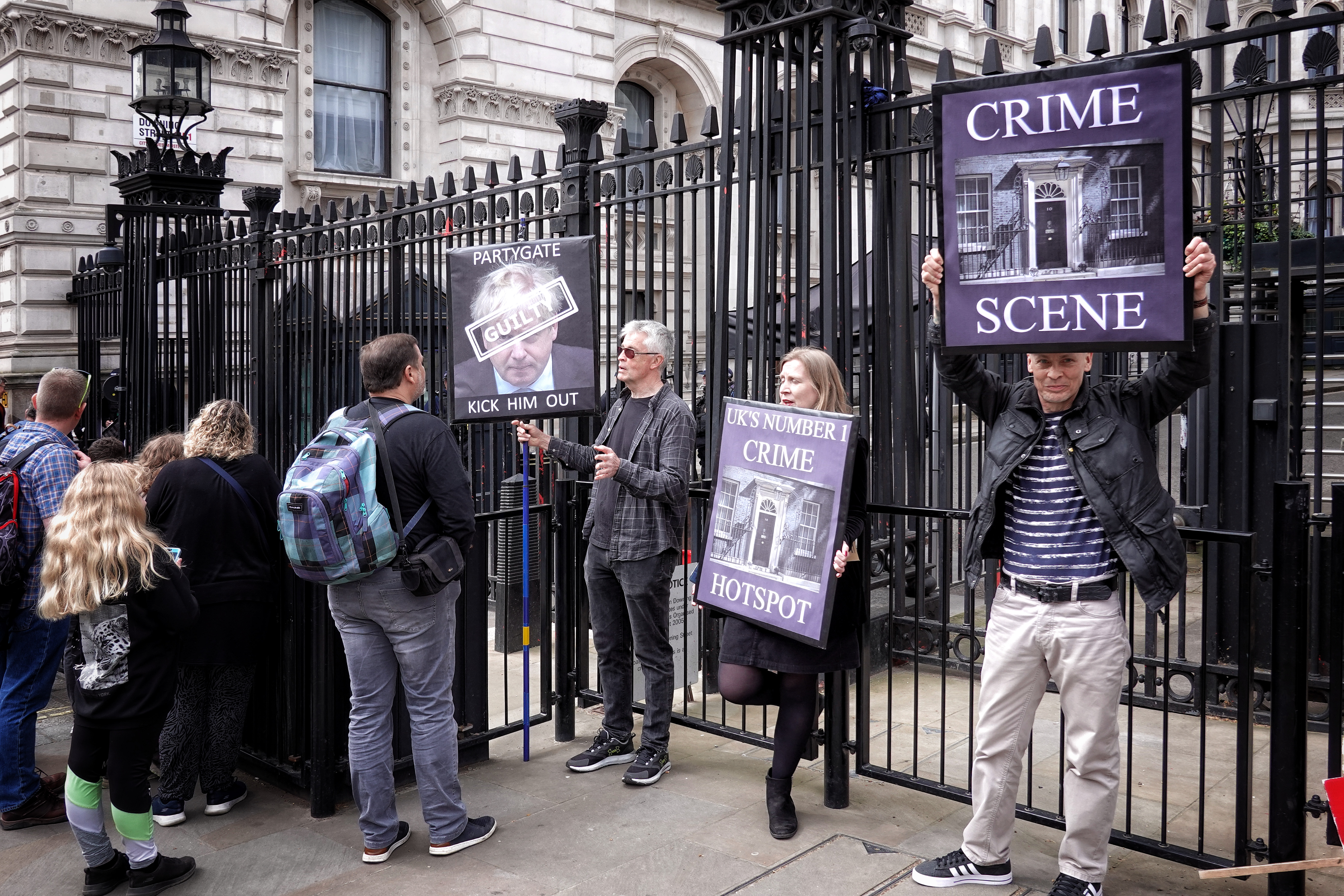
- Protesters outside Downing Street on 13 April 2022
  13 April
  - Ali Harbi Ali is given a rare whole life order, following his guilty verdict two days earlier. At the Old Bailey, Justice Sweeney describes it as "an exceptional case" that "struck at the heart of our democracy."
  - Inflation hits 7%, up from 6.2% the previous month and the highest level since 1992.
- 14 April
  - COVID-19 vaccination in the UK: Valneva is approved as the UK's sixth vaccine.
  - COVID-19 vaccination in the UK: The Moderna vaccine is approved for use in 6 to 11-year-olds.
  - The UK signs the Rwanda asylum plan, to fly thousands of migrants who cross the English Channel in lorries or on boats more than 4,000 miles on chartered planes to the African country. The plan is criticised by many charities, as well as opposition figures.
- 15 April – The UN refugee agency condemns the plan to send migrants to Rwanda, deeming it illegal and discriminatory under international law.
- 19 April – In a statement to the House of Commons, Prime Minister Johnson apologises following his receipt of a fixed penalty notice for breaching lockdown rules, and says that he did not realise he had breached rules at the time.
- 20 April – 2022 Russian invasion of Ukraine: Russian and Belarusian players are banned from the Wimbledon tennis tournament.
- 21 April
  - Johnson begins a two-day visit to India to discuss trade and security with the country's premier, Narendra Modi.
  - MPs debate a motion calling for an inquiry into claims that Johnson misled Parliament over Partygate.
- 23 April – Ospreys nesting in Poole Harbour produce an egg, the first in southern England in modern times.
- 24 April
  - The Elections Act 2022 receives royal assent, The Act introduces voter photo identification for in-person voting to the UK for the first time. The requirement would apply to UK general elections, English local elections, and police and crime commissioner elections in England and Wales.
  - Labour's deputy leader Angela Rayner is accused by anonymous Tory MPs of "distracting" the prime minister in the Commons by crossing and uncrossing her legs. Rayner describes the claim as a "perverted smear" that shows women in politics continue to face misogyny. Her comments are echoed by Johnson, who says he "deplores" the comments directed at her.
- 25 April – Four people are stabbed to death in Bermondsey, London.
- 26 April – DJ Tim Westwood is accused of predatory and unwanted sexual behaviour by seven women, as part of a joint BBC and Guardian investigation. He steps down from his Capital Xtra radio show the following day.
- 27 April
  - In a statement, Conservative Chief Whip Chris Heaton-Harris says he is investigating reports that a Conservative MP watched pornography on his phone in the House of Commons chamber, after complaints from female Tory MPs. The MP is later revealed to be Neil Parish, Conservative MP for Tiverton and Honiton.
  - COVID-19 in the UK: The High Court of England and Wales rules that the UK government's policies on discharging untested patients from hospital to care homes in England at the start of the pandemic was unlawful because they failed to take into account the potential risk of COVID-19 to elderly and vulnerable people.
- 28 April
  - 2022 Russian invasion of Ukraine: Scott Sibley, aged 36, becomes the first British national confirmed to have died in the conflict. A second Briton is reported missing.
  - Marriage and Civil Partnership (Minimum Age) Act raises the minimum age for marriage to 18 in England and Wales.
  - Police, Crime, Sentencing and Courts Act 2022 gives the police greater powers to control public demonstrations; replaces the common law offence of public nuisance with a statutory offence; imposes greater penalties for offences against children; and makes statutory a code of practice for police recording of non-crime hate incidents.
- 29 April
  - Conservative MP Neil Parish is suspended from the Conservative Whip over allegations that he watched pornography on his phone in the House of Commons.
  - Boris Becker, former tennis champion, is jailed for 2 1/2 years following his trial at Southwark Crown Court for breaking UK insolvency laws after his 2017 bankruptcy.
- 30 April – Neil Parish admits to watching pornography twice in the House of Commons and says that he will resign as an MP.

=== May ===
- 2 May – The 2022 World Snooker Championship concludes with Ronnie O'Sullivan defeating Judd Trump 18–13 in the final. This is O'Sullivan's 7th world title, equalling the record held by Stephen Hendry.
- 4 May – 2022 Russian invasion of Ukraine: A new set of sanctions is announced by the government, with Russia banned from using British management consulting, accounting and PR services.
- 5 May – The Bank of England raises the interest rate from 0.75 to 1.0%, its highest level since February 2009 and the fourth successive increase. The Bank also warns that inflation could reach 10% later in 2022.
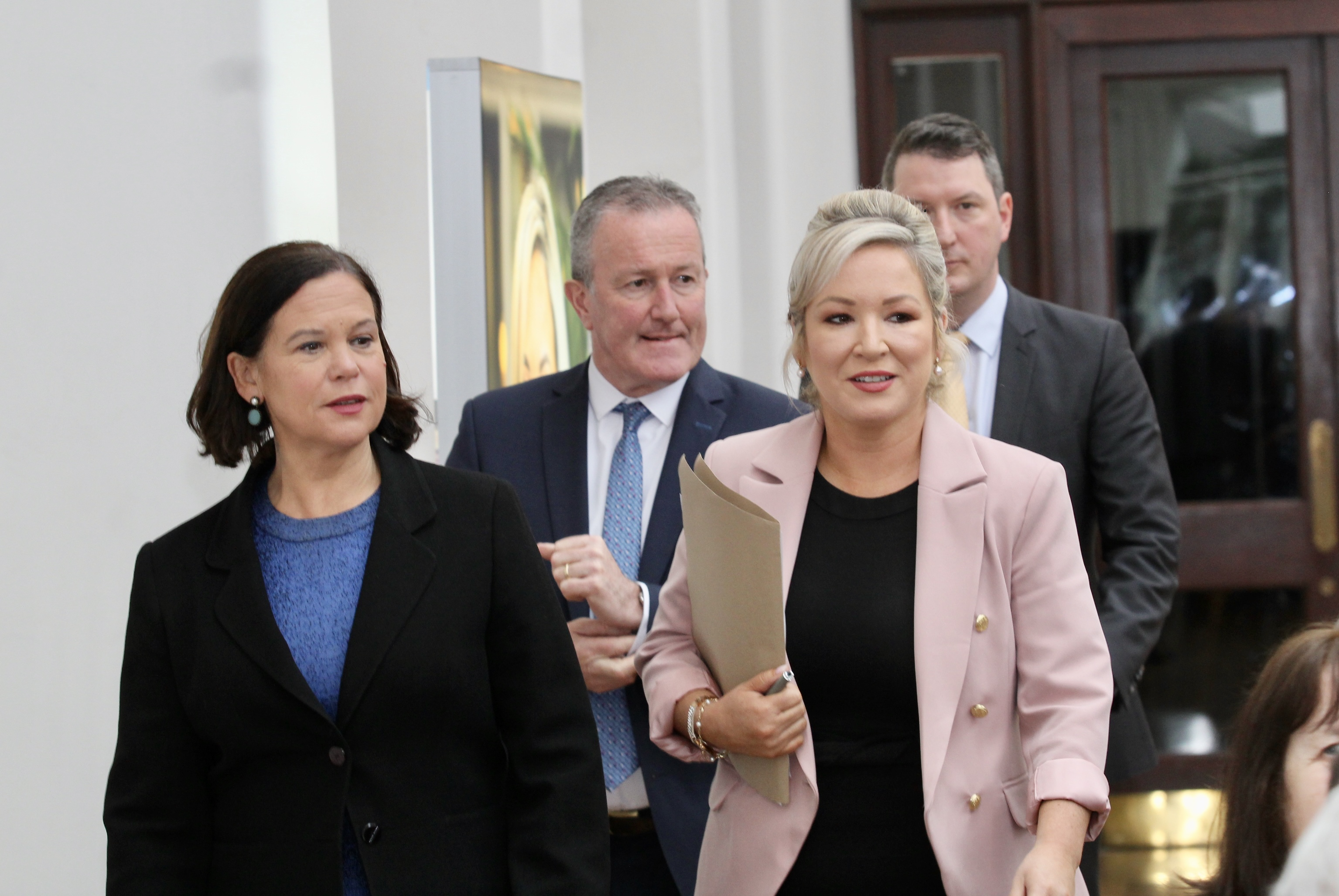
  Sinn Féin leader Michelle O'Neill and other party officials at a campaign event in the run up to the 2022 Northern Ireland Assembly election which saw the party gain the most votes at a Northern Ireland election for the first time
- 6 May
  - 2022 United Kingdom local elections: The Conservatives suffer a net loss of 485 seats, which includes the London boroughs of Barnet, Wandsworth, and Westminster, formerly considered Tory strongholds. Labour gain 108 seats, while the Liberal Democrats gain 240. The Green Party has one of its best ever results, with a net gain of 87 seats. In Scotland, the SNP gains 22 seats, while in Northern Ireland, Sinn Féin receives the largest vote share.
  - Convenience store chain McColl's is placed into administration, putting more than 16,000 jobs at risk.
  - Durham Police launch an investigation into whether Keir Starmer broke lockdown rules after he drank beer at an MP's constituency office during a visit to the area (dubbed 'Beergate').
- 7 May – 2022 monkeypox outbreak: Public Health England informs the World Health Organization that a case of monkeypox has been detected in an individual who travelled to Nigeria and returned to the UK, where they were hospitalised and isolated. In the following days and weeks, additional cases begin to be reported, both in the UK and other countries.
- 8 May
  - 2022 Russian invasion of Ukraine: A new set of sanctions is announced by the government, targeting £1.7bn of trade with both Russia and Belarus. This includes import tariffs on platinum and palladium, alongside export bans on chemicals, plastics, rubber and machinery.
  - The Met Office warns that the probability of global average temperatures reaching 1.5 °C above pre-industrial levels over the next five years is now almost 50:50 (48%). It also predicts a more than 90% chance that a new record high will occur in at least one year from 2022 to 2026.
- 9 May – Meghan Gallacher is appointed Deputy Leader of the Scottish Conservatives.
- 10 May – 2022 State Opening of Parliament: Charles, Prince of Wales and Prince William, Duke of Cambridge open the third session of the 2019 Parliament on behalf of Queen Elizabeth II with the traditional Queen's Speech, the first time an heir-apparent to the throne has opened Parliament since George IV did so on behalf of his father, George III.
- 12 May – Partygate: Police issue another 50 fixed penalty notices for breaches of COVID-19 rules in Downing Street and other government buildings.
- 14 May – Eurovision Song Contest 2022: The UK entry performed by Sam Ryder finishes in second place with 466 points, and wins the jury vote.
- 16 May
  - Blackpool player Jake Daniels becomes the first male football player to come out as gay since Justin Fashanu in 1990.
  - Foreign Secretary Liz Truss states that the UK welcomes the declarations of intent by Sweden and Finland to apply for NATO membership.
- 17 May
  - Unemployment falls to its lowest level since 1974, with more job vacancies (1.3 million) than unemployed people in the UK for the first time since records began.
  - Brexit: Foreign Secretary Liz Truss announces a plan to unilaterally abandon parts of the Northern Ireland protocol.
  - An unnamed Conservative MP is arrested for rape and sexual assault charges spanning seven years between 2002 and 2009.
  - The Queen visits Paddington Station to attend the official event to mark the completion of London Underground's Elizabeth line.
- 18 May – Inflation hits 9%, up from 7% the previous month and the highest level since 1982. The figure is the highest of any G7 nation.
- 19 May
  - COVID-19 pandemic in the UK: The Joint Committee on Vaccination and Immunisation recommends adults over the age of 65, frontline health workers and people aged 16–64 who are classed as vulnerable should receive a COVID booster vaccine in the autumn.
  - Partygate: Downing Street confirms Prime Minister Johnson will not receive any further fines after police conclude their investigation into the Partygate affair.
- 20 May
  - 2022 monkeypox outbreak: Following the initial case on 7 May, the number of confirmed infections in the UK reaches 20. Health Secretary Sajid Javid updates G7 health ministers on its spread, and says that the government has procured vaccines that are effective against the virus.
  - The Platinum Jubilee Civic Honours are announced, with eight towns being given city status.
- 21 May – Five people are injured after parts of spectator stands collapse during a rehearsal for the Trooping the Colour ceremony at Horse Guards Parade in central London.
- 23 May
  - Former Wakefield Conservative MP Imran Ahmad Khan is sentenced to 18 months in jail for sexually assaulting a 15-year-old boy.
  - 2022 monkeypox outbreak: The UK Health Security Agency (UKHSA) reports another 37 infections, including the first known case in Scotland, bringing the total to 57.
  - Partygate: Photos published by ITV News show Boris Johnson holding up a glass at a leaving do on 13 November 2020, when COVID-19 regulations meant such gatherings were only allowed if reasonably necessary for work purposes. The Met Police's decision-making process during the inquiry into events at No 10 and Whitehall is questioned by lawyers, while MPs suggest the photos prove Johnson lied at the dispatch box.
- 24 May
  - The Elizabeth line opens in London.
  - Partygate: Staff who attended events at Downing Street during lockdown tell the BBC's Panorama programme that people crowded together, sat on each other's laps and mocked those anxious about COVID-19. The programme also alleges that Johnson asked Sue Gray to scrap her report, although this is denied by Downing Street.
  - 2021–2022 global energy crisis: Ofgem chief executive Jonathan Brearley warns the average household energy bill is set to rise by about £800 a year in October.
  - Members of the National Union of Rail, Maritime and Transport Workers vote overwhelmingly in favour of strike action, paving the way for the first national rail strike since 1994.
- 25 May
  - Partygate: The full version of the Gray Report is published. In the 37-page document, Sue Gray concludes that senior Downing Street officials, both political and non-political, "bear responsibility" for the culture of partying during COVID lockdowns.
  - Plymouth College of Art is granted university status as Arts University Plymouth.
- 26 May
  - 2022 monkeypox outbreak: The first cases in Wales and Northern Ireland are reported.
  - Four Conservative MPs – John Baron, David Simmonds, Julian Sturdy and Stephen Hammond – join a growing list of MPs urging Johnson to resign.
  - Chancellor Rishi Sunak announces a £15 billion package of measures to address soaring energy costs, partly offset by a 25% windfall tax on oil and gas firms' profits. He tells the Commons that every UK household will get an energy bill discount of £400 in October, while the poorest households will also get a payment of £650 to ease living costs.
- 27 May
  - COVID-19 in the UK: The Office for National Statistics (ONS) reports that coronavirus infections have declined to around a million, from a peak of 4.9 million in early April, and are continuing to fall.
  - A new version of the Ministerial Code is published, removing the need for a minister to resign over breaches of its rules.
- 28 May – Partygate: A further two Conservative MPs – former health minister Steve Brine and Newton Abbot MP Anne Marie Morris – confirm they have submitted letters of no confidence in Johnson.
- 30 May
  - Partygate: Former attorney general Jeremy Wright becomes the latest Conservative MP to call for the resignation of Boris Johnson as prime minister, while backbench MPs Elliot Colburn and Andrew Bridgen are the latest Conservatives to submit a letter of no confidence in Johnson.
  - 2022 monkeypox outbreak: A further 71 cases of monkeypox are reported in England, bringing the UK total to 179.
  - COVID-19 in the UK: Archbishop of Canterbury Justin Welby confirms he will not be attending the Platinum Jubilee National Service of Thanksgiving on 3 June due to a positive COVID-19 test. His place will be taken by Archbishop of York Stephen Cottrell.
  - A 3.8 magnitude earthquake is recorded in Shropshire, with its epicentre at Wem in the north of the county.
- 31 May
  - Partygate: John Stevenson becomes the latest Conservative MP to write a letter of no confidence in Boris Johnson. The prime minister is also criticised by Dame Andrea Leadsom, although she stops short of calling for his resignation.
  - Partygate: Lord Geidt, the Independent Adviser on Ministers' Interests, says there is a "legitimate question" over whether Johnson broke the ministerial code after being fined over the Partygate affair.
  - Beergate: It is confirmed that Labour Party leader Keir Starmer and his deputy, Angela Rayner, have received questionnaires from Durham Constabulary as part of their investigation into the gathering both politicians attended on 30 April 2021.
  - Rwanda asylum plan: The Home Office confirms 14 June as the date on which the first flight carrying migrants who have crossed the English Channel will leave for Rwanda.
  - Bradford is named the 2025 UK City of Culture.

=== June ===
- 1 June
  - Recent disruption at airports continues to affect holidaymakers, with many flights being cancelled. The cause is attributed to staff shortages, as the industry struggles to recruit replacements for the workers laid off during the COVID-19 pandemic.
  - COVID-19 in the UK: The Office for National Statistics (ONS) reports that the number of people suffering from Long COVID now exceeds 2 million, or about 3% of the UK population.
  - West Ham United defender Kurt Zouma is sentenced to 180 hours of community service after pleading guilty to kicking and slapping his cat. He is also banned from keeping cats for five years.
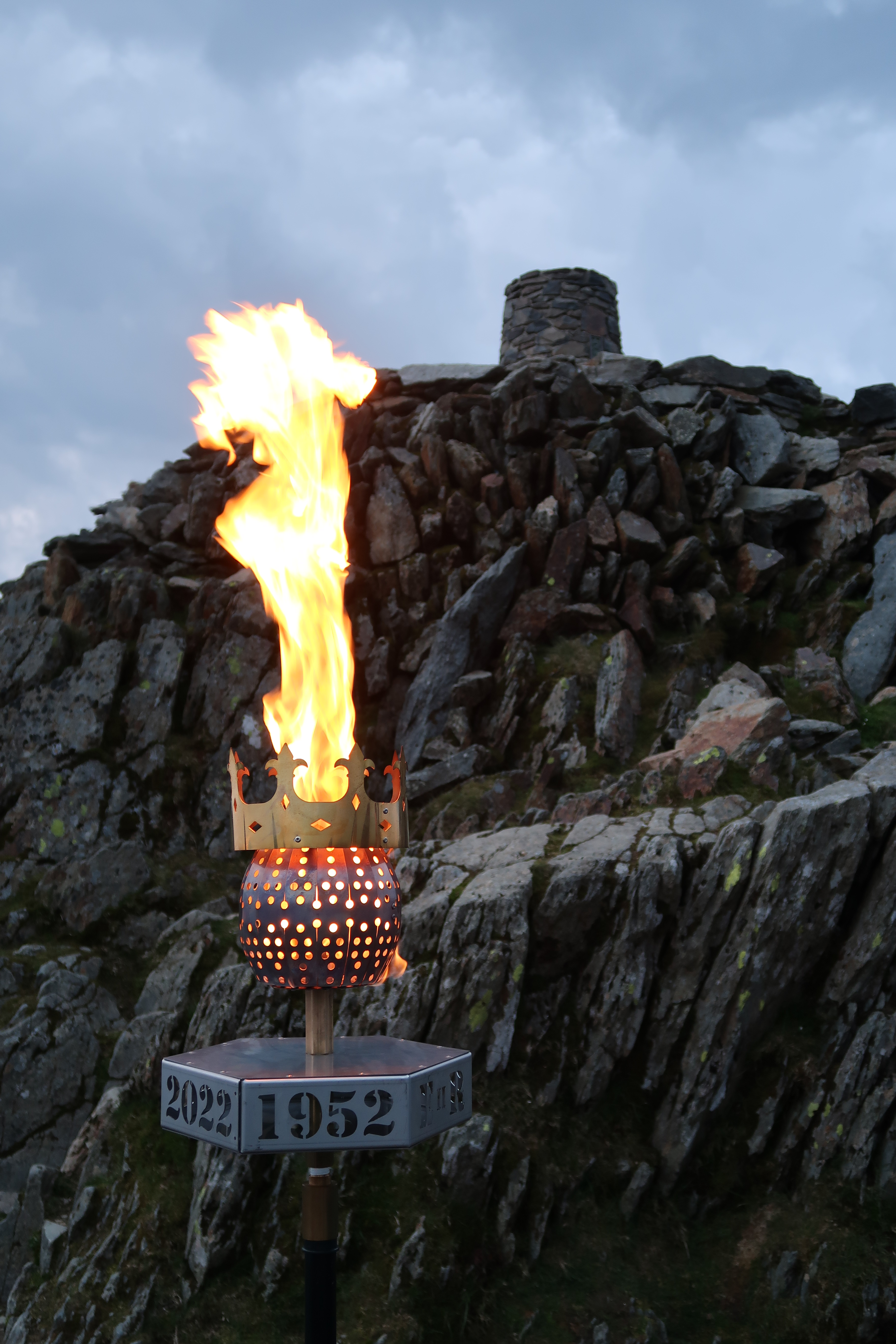
    Mount Snowdon beacon lit on 2 June to celebrate the Queen's Platinum Jubillee
- 2 June – Platinum Jubilee of Elizabeth II: The Queen attends the Trooping the Colour parade at Horse Guards Parade, a flypast by the Red Arrows and lights the first Platinum Jubilee Beacon at Windsor Castle, but it is announced she will not attend the Service of Thanksgiving at St Paul's Cathedral the following day after experiencing some discomfort during the flypast. The Duke of York will also be absent from the service after testing positive for COVID-19.
- 3 June
  - The Platinum Jubilee National Service of Thanksgiving is held at St Paul's Cathedral, where the Queen is praised for "staying the course" by Archbishop of York Stephen Cottrell.
  - Buckingham Palace confirms the Queen will not attend the following day's Epsom Derby but will watch the event on television.
  - The government's plan to reintroduce imperial measurements is criticised by Asda chairman and Conservative peer Lord Rose, who says it will drive up costs for businesses and will only please a "small minority who hark for the past".
- 4 June – The Platinum Party at the Palace takes place. A pre-recorded sketch is shown of Elizabeth II and a CGI Paddington Bear acting together, and both of them tapping teaspoons on their cups to "We Will Rock You" by Queen.
- 5 June
  - The Platinum Jubilee Pageant takes place in London, concluding the Jubilee weekend. Afterwards, the Queen releases a message of thanks in which she says she is "humbled and deeply touched" by the celebrations across the UK.
  - The British journalist Dom Phillips is reported missing in a remote part of Amazonas state in Brazil.
- 6 June
  - Sir Graham Brady, Chairman of the 1922 committee of the Conservative Party, announces a vote of confidence in Boris Johnson's leadership of the party. A secret ballot is held from 6-8pm. The party's MPs decide that they have confidence in Johnson's leadership. However, more than 40% vote against him, with a result of 211 to 148.
  - 2022 monkeypox outbreak: The UK Health Security Agency confirms more cases of monkeypox have been identified in the UK, bringing the total detected to 302.
- 7 June – Cinema chain Cineworld cancels all showings of the historical drama The Lady of Heaven, following days of protests by Muslims who say that the movie is blasphemous and sectarian. Cineworld says that the decision to cancel showings was to "ensure the safety of our staff and customers".
- 8 June – The average price of petrol rises by two pence, to 180.73p per litre, the biggest daily jump in 17 years.
- 9 June – The Ministry of Defence acquires the government's first quantum computer.
- 10 June
  - The discovery is announced of Gloucester, wrecked in Royal Navy service off the coast of Norfolk in 1682. The shipwreck was found in 2007, but the discovery only revealed today for security reasons.
  - Foreign Secretary Liz Truss speaks by phone to Dmytro Kuleba, her counterpart in Ukraine, following the capture and sentencing to death of two Britons fighting Russian forces in Donetsk. She calls it a "sham judgment" with "absolutely no legitimacy".
  - COVID-19 in the UK: The ONS reports that the number of infections has begun to increase again, for the first time in two months, likely caused by the original Omicron variant and newer variants BA.4 and BA.5.
- 12 June – The Queen becomes the second longest reigning monarch in history, behind only Louis XIV of France who became king at the age of four.
- 13 June
  - Rwanda asylum plan: The Court of Appeal gives the go-ahead for the first flight to Rwanda carrying asylum seekers to leave the UK the next day.
  - Brexit: The UK government publishes the Northern Ireland Protocol Bill, which will change aspects of the Northern Ireland Protocol to enable the easier flow of goods from Great Britain to Northern Ireland.
  - Figures released by the ONS show the economy contracted by 0.3% in April, prompting concerns that the UK is going into recession. The ONS says that the fall was driven by all main parts of the economy but accentuated by the effect that the winding down of COVID-19 testing had on the health sector.
  - At the High Court, Brexit campaigner Arron Banks loses a libel case against investigative journalist Carole Cadwalladr.
- 14 June
  - Rwanda asylum plan: It is confirmed the first flight scheduled to depart for Rwanda and carrying seven asylum seekers will not depart following legal challenges in the European Court of Human Rights.
  - Russia publishes a list of UK journalists and public figures who it has banned from entering Russia in response to sanctions against that country. The list includes journalists working for the BBC, Sky, Channel Four and Channel 5.
  - Scotland's First Minister, Nicola Sturgeon, launches the first of a series of papers setting out the case for a second Scottish independence referendum.
- 15 June – Lord Geidt resigns as the UK government's Independent Adviser on Ministers' Interests, after being asked to advise on an issue he believed would be a deliberate breach of the Ministerial Code. A Downing Street spokesperson says he had been asked "to provide advice on a commercially sensitive matter in the national interest, which has previously had cross-party support. No decision had been taken pending that advice".
- 16 June
  - The Bank of England raises the interest rate from 1.0% to 1.25%, the fifth successive increase, in a bid to restrain inflation.
  - England's hospital waiting list reaches a new record high of 6.5 million people.
  - Researchers led by the UK's Institute of Cancer Research describe a new light-activated 'photoimmunotherapy' for brain cancer. They believe it could join surgery, chemotherapy, radiotherapy and immunotherapy as a fifth major form of cancer treatment.
- 17 June
  - Home Secretary Priti Patel approves the extradition of WikiLeaks founder Julian Assange to the United States, where he faces up to 175 years in jail for violating the Espionage Act. He is given 14 days to appeal.
  - The hottest day of the year in the UK is recorded for a third consecutive day. Santon Downham, in Suffolk, is measured at 32.7 °C (90 °F), surpassing the previous day's high of 29.5 °C (85.1 °F) at Northolt, west London.
  - COVID-19 in the UK: The latest Office for National Statistics figures indicate another rise in COVID-19 cases, with the Platinum Jubilee celebrations thought to have contributed to the increase. Figures show 1.4 million people with the virus, or one in 45, a rise from one in 65 the previous week.
  - A body found in the Vale do Javari in Amazonas, Brazil on 13 June is proved to be that of missing British journalist Dom Phillips.
- 18 June
  - The National Union of Rail, Maritime and Transport Workers confirms the rail and tube strikes planned for 21, 23 and 25 June will go ahead, after talks to resolve the situation ended without agreement.
  - Thousands of protesters march through London to demand action from the government on the cost of living crisis.
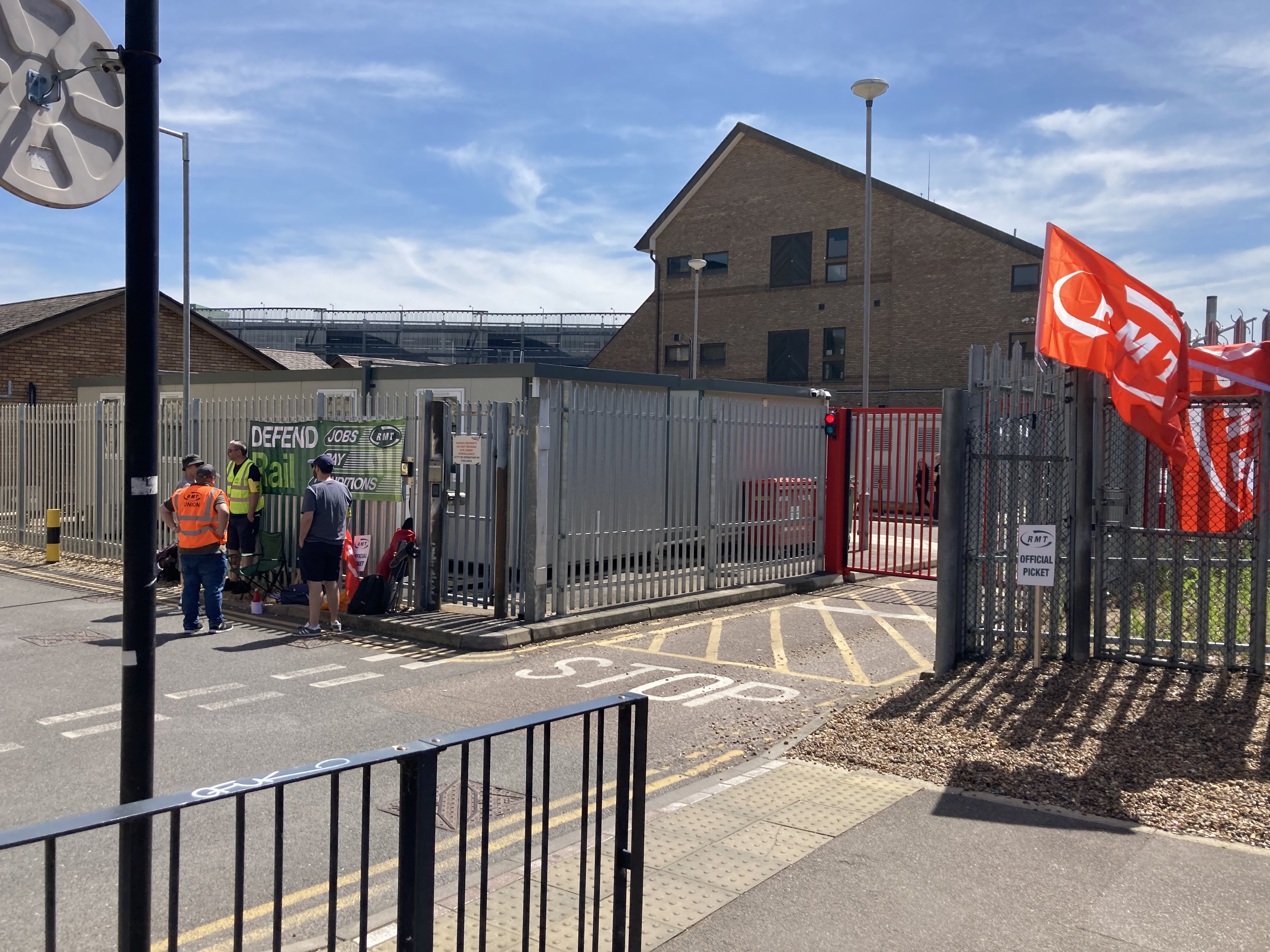
    RMT union members striking outside Network Rail property in Cambridge on 21 June 2022
- 21 June – The biggest rail strike since 1989 takes place, affecting 80% of services across England, Scotland and Wales, including the London Underground. Unions claim that Network Rail is threatening to cut safety-critical jobs (a characterisation that Network Rail rejects) as part of its modernisation programme, which would also include an increase in working hours. Rail workers also demand pay rises to keep up with soaring inflation. However, critics of the strike point to changing commuter habits, such as ticket offices being nearly obsolete, as well as more working from home, and the need for efficiency improvements.
- 22 June
  - Inflation increases to 9.1%, from 9% last month.
  - The UK Health Security Agency declares a national incident after poliovirus is found in sewage samples collected from the Beckton Sewage Treatment Works, East London.
- 23 June
  - The UK is hit by a second day of rail strikes. RMT boss Mick Lynch warns that further strikes are "extremely likely" if talks to resolve the dispute continue to fail.
  - 2022 Wakefield by-election: Labour regain the seat from the Conservatives with a 47.9% vote share.
  - 2022 Tiverton and Honiton by-election: The Liberal Democrats gain the seat, overturning a substantial Conservative majority of 24,239.
- 24 June
  - COVID-19 in the UK: The latest Office for National Statistics data suggests another rise in the number of people infected with COVID, with 1.7 million people with the virus in the week up to 18 June, roughly one in 38.
  - International chemicals firm Tata Chemicals Europe opens the UK's first industrial-scale carbon capture and utilisation plant in Northwich, Cheshire.
- 25 June – A third day of rail strikes are held across the country.
- 26 June
  - SNP MP Patrick Grady resigns party membership and will sit as an independent in the House of Commons.
  - Murder of Zara Aleena by a prisoner on licence in London.
- 27 June – Barristers walk out of courts across England and Wales in a dispute over legal aid funding.
- 28 June
  - Scotland's First Minister Nicola Sturgeon proposes 19 October 2023 as the date for a second referendum on independence.
  - Initial results from the 2021 census are published, showing a 6.3% rise in the population of England and Wales since the previous census in 2011, one of the biggest increases on record. The population of England and Wales is 59,597,300, while the UK is estimated at 66,966,400. The figures show more people aged over 65 than ever before.
  - 2022 monkeypox outbreak: The number of cases recorded in the UK exceeds 1,000.
  - COVID-19 in the UK: A public inquiry begins into the UK's handling of the pandemic.
- 29 June – The Climate Change Committee publishes its largest UK climate progress report to date, warning that the UK will fail to achieve net zero by 2050 under current policies.
- 30 June
  - An additional £1 billion in funding for military aid to Ukraine is announced.
  - Former SNP MP Natalie McGarry is jailed for two years for embezzling £25,000.
  - Tamworth MP Chris Pincher resigns as Conservative Party deputy chief whip, saying he "embarrassed myself and other people" and "drank far too much" following an incident at a party the previous evening.
  - 2022 monkeypox outbreak: Professor Kevin Fenton of Public Health England urges anyone with monkeypox symptoms – blisters, fevers, and swollen glands – not to attend Pride events over the weekend.
  - Leasehold Reform (Ground Rent) Act 2022 comes into force, effectively abolishing ground rent for newly built residential properties in England and Wales.

=== July ===
- 1 July
  - Chris Pincher has the Conservative Party Whip withdrawn and will sit in the House of Commons as an independent MP. A formal complaint about his conduct is also lodged with the Independent Complaints and Grievance Scheme (ICGS).
  - COVID-19 in the UK: Office for National Statistics data suggests COVID-19 cases in the UK are rising again, with 2.3 million people infected with the virus, around one in 30, in the week ending 24 June. The statistics show a 32% rise on the previous week, with the Omicron BA.4 and BA.5 variants thought to be responsible for the rise.
- 2 July – Members of the ASLEF union stage their second strike in two weeks, in a dispute over pay, affecting 90% of train services operated by Greater Anglia.
- 3 July
  - A further six allegations against Chris Pincher emerge, involving behaviour over a decade. One complainant is reported to have given 10 Downing Street details in February 2022 and expressed concerns over Pincher becoming a whip in charge of other MPs' welfare. Work and Pensions Secretary Therese Coffey tells the BBC that prime minister Boris Johnson was not aware of "specific allegations" against Pincher at the time of his appointment as Deputy Chief Whip in February 2022.
  - Carlos Sainz wins the 2022 British Grand Prix, taking his maiden race win in the Formula One World Championship.
- 4 July – The number of pubs in England and Wales falls below 40,000 to its lowest level on record, driven by a combination of rising costs and changing social behaviours.
- 5 July
  - July 2022 United Kingdom government crisis:
    - In an interview with the BBC's Chris Mason, Johnson says he had been told about a misconduct complaint against Pincher before appointing him to the role of Deputy Chief Whip in February 2022. Johnson describes his decision as a "bad mistake".
    - Sajid Javid resigns as health secretary, saying he "can no longer, in good conscience, continue serving in this government."
    - Rishi Sunak, the chancellor, also resigns, saying the public expect government to be conducted "properly, competently and seriously."
    - Andrew Murrison resigns as Prime Ministerial Trade Envoy to Morocco.
    - Bim Afolami, Vice Chair of the Conservative party, resigns on air during an interview with TalkTV.
    - Jonathan Gullis resigns as Parliamentary Private Secretary to the Secretary of State for Northern Ireland, saying "we have been focused on dealing with our reputational damage rather than delivering for the people."
    - Saqib Bhatti, Parliamentary Private Secretary to now former health secretary Sajid Javid, also resigns.
    - Nicola Richards, Parliamentary Private Secretary to the Department for Transport, quits her role, describing the Conservative Party as "currently unrecognisable."
    - Virginia Crosbie, Parliamentary Private Secretary to the Wales Office, also resigns.
    - Alex Chalk resigns as Solicitor General, citing the Owen Paterson scandal, Partygate and the Chris Pincher scandal.
    - Saqib Bhatti resigns as parliamentary private secretary to the secretary of state.
    - Laura Trott resigns as Parliamentary Private Secretary to the Department for Transport, citing "trust in politics is – and must always be – of the utmost importance, but sadly in recent months this has been lost".
  - In the latest of a series of climate protests at art museums around the world, Just Stop Oil protestors glue themselves to paintings within the Royal Academy of Arts, including its depiction of The Last Supper.
- 6 July
  - July 2022 United Kingdom government crisis:
    - Will Quince an education minister, resigns after "accepting and repeating assurances to the media [from No 10] which have now been found to be inaccurate".
    - Robin Walker resigns as Minister of State for School Standards, saying he cannot "in good conscience" serve in Johnson's government.
    - John Glen resigns as Economic Secretary to the Treasury, citing "poor judgment" shown by Johnson.
    - Victoria Atkins resigns as Minister of State for Prisons and Probation, citing concerns with party leadership.
    - Jo Churchill resigns as Parliamentary Under-Secretary of State for Agri-Innovation and Climate Adaptation, citing concerns over "integrity, competence, and judgement" by the prime minister.
    - Stuart Andrew resigns as Minister of State for Housing, saying "our great country deserve better."
    - Felicity Buchan resigns as Parliamentary Private Secretary in the Department for Business, Energy and Industrial Strategy.
    - Selaine Saxby resigns as Parliamentary Private Secretary to the Treasury, citing concerns over "trust, truth and integrity" in government.
    - Claire Coutinho resigns as Parliamentary Private Secretary to the Treasury, saying "events of recent weeks" are a distraction.
    - David Johnston resigns as Parliamentary Private Secretary in the Department for Education, citing concerns over Johnson's leadership.
    - Five ministers – Kemi Badenoch, Neil O'Brien, Alex Burghart, Lee Rowley and Julia Lopez – issue a joint resignation letter, saying "it has become increasingly clear that the government cannot function given the issues that have come to light" and calling on Johnson to resign. Dozens of further resignations are announced during the next 24 hours, bringing the total to 63, out of 179 Government officials.
    - Boris Johnson dismisses Secretary of State for Levelling Up Michael Gove, due to Gove's calls for him to resign.
    - In an interview with ITV's Robert Peston, Attorney General Suella Braverman announces that she will stand in a Conservative Party leadership election if one is called.
  - The pound slides to a two-year low against the dollar.
  - The income threshold for paying National Insurance is raised from £9,880 to £12,570, meaning that two million workers will no longer pay it.
  - UEFA Women's Euro 2022 commences. The competition is hosted in England, and England win their first match against Austria 1–0.
- 7 July
  - Boris Johnson announces his pending resignation as prime minister and Conservative Party leader as a result of the resignations from his ministry, prompting a leadership election which will finish in September.
  - July 2022 United Kingdom government crisis: Education Secretary Michelle Donelan resigns after 36 hours in the post.
  - Tom Tugendhat, Chair of the Foreign Affairs Select Committee, announces he will put his name forward for the September 2022 Conservative Party leadership election.
- 8 July
  - Former Chancellor Rishi Sunak launches his campaign for the September 2022 Conservative Party leadership election.
  - Labour leader Keir Starmer and deputy Angela Rayner are cleared of breaking lockdown rules over a Durham "beergate" meeting.
  - Sir Mark Rowley is appointed as Commissioner of the Metropolitan Police, succeeding Dame Cressida Dick.
  - COVID-19 in the United Kingdom: The latest Office for National Statistics data for the week ending 1 July suggests 2.7 million people, or one in 25, were infected with COVID-19 as the number of cases continue to rise.
  - Stephen Greenhalgh resigns as Building Safety and Fire Minister, citing the events leading up to Johnson's resignation.
  - A heat health alert is issued for parts of the UK with temperatures expected to exceed 30 °C in the coming days.
- 9 July
  - September 2022 Conservative Party leadership election:
    - Sajid Javid, former health secretary, launches his campaign to be the next leader of the Conservative Party.
    - Jeremy Hunt, also a former health secretary, launches his bid to be the next Conservative leader.
    - Grant Shapps, Transport Secretary launches his leadership campaign.
    - Nadhim Zahawi, Chancellor, announces his intention to run.
    - Kemi Badenoch, former Equalities Minister, announces her candidacy.
- 10 July
  - September 2022 Conservative Party leadership election:
    - Penny Mordaunt, Secretary of State for Trade Policy, launches her leadership campaign.
    - Liz Truss, Foreign Secretary, launches her leadership campaign.
    - Rehman Chishti launches his leadership campaign.
  - Novak Djokovic beats Nick Kyrgios to win the 2022 Wimbledon Championships.
- 11 July
  - September 2022 Conservative Party leadership election: 1922 Committee chair Sir Graham Brady unveils the timetable for the leadership election, with the election due to complete on 5 September.
  - As temperatures reach 32 °C in some places, the Met Office issues an extreme weather warning for Sunday 17 July, when temperatures are expected to climb even higher.
  - Members of the Associated Society of Locomotive Engineers and Firemen (ASLEF) at eight train operators vote overwhelmingly to take strike action in a dispute over pay, while members of the Transport Salaried Staffs Association (TSSA) at South Western Railway also vote to take industrial action.
- 12 July
  - A report from a three-year inquiry into the child sexual exploitation in Telford is released. It reveals more than 1,000 girls had been abused over a 40-year period, and that agencies blamed victims for the abuse they suffered, not the perpetrators, and exploitation was not investigated because of "nervousness about race" in the belief that investigation against Asian men would inflame "racial tensions". The report makes 47 recommendations for improvement by agencies involved. West Mercia Police apologise "unequivocally" for past events, as well as Telford and Wrekin Council. Victims were often blamed for "child prostitution" and offenders were emboldened by the lack of police action.
  - September 2022 Conservative Party leadership election: Nominations for the election are confirmed, with eight candidates – Kemi Badenoch, Suella Braverman, Jeremy Hunt, Penny Mordaunt, Rishi Sunak, Tom Tugendhat, Liz Truss and Nadhim Zahawi – going into the leadership race. Three candidates – Rehman Chishti, Sajid Javid and Grant Shapps – withdraw before they can be nominated.
  - 2022 United Kingdom railway strike: Network Rail makes a fresh pay offer worth more than 5%, but linked to workers accepting "modernising reforms".
- 13 July
  - September 2022 Conservative Party leadership election: Jeremy Hunt and Nadhim Zahawi are eliminated in the first round of MPs' voting, while Rishi Sunak and Penny Mordaunt emerge as the frontrunners.
  - COVID-19 in the UK: The number of confirmed deaths from the virus is reported to have exceeded 200,000. Omicron BA.4 and BA.5 are now the dominant subvariants.
  - 2022 United Kingdom railway strike: The National Union of Rail, Maritime and Transport Workers (RMT) announces another 24-hour strike for Wednesday 27 July.
  - The Met Office extends its severe weather warning to Tuesday 19 July, when temperatures are expected to peak at 36 °C.
- 14 July
  - September 2022 Conservative Party leadership election: Suella Braverman is knocked out of the contest in the second round of the MPs' ballot, with Sunak and Mordaunt remaining the front runners.
  - 2022 United Kingdom railway strike: ASLEF announces that train drivers at eight train companies – Arriva Rail London, Chiltern Railways, Great Western Railway, LNER, Greater Anglia, Southeastern, Hull Trains and West Midlands Trains – will strike on 30 July. The RMT also announces strikes at Network Rail and 14 train operators for 18 and 20 August.
- 15 July
  - A national emergency is declared after a red extreme heat warning is issued by the Met Office for London, the south east and parts of central England as temperatures are expected to reach 40 °C on 18 and 19 July, while the UK Health Security Agency increases its own warning to level four, indicating a risk to life among the fit and healthy.
  - COVID-19 in the UK:
    - The latest Office for National Statistics data for the week ending 8 July indicates 3.5 million people, roughly one in 18, were infected with COVID-19 in that week, up from one in 25, or 2.7 million, the previous week.
    - The vaccine booster programme scheduled for the coming autumn is extended to cover all adults over 50, along with younger people considered to be vulnerable and health and social care workers.
- 17 July – The UK government confirms that every state school in England will have a defibrillator by summer 2023.
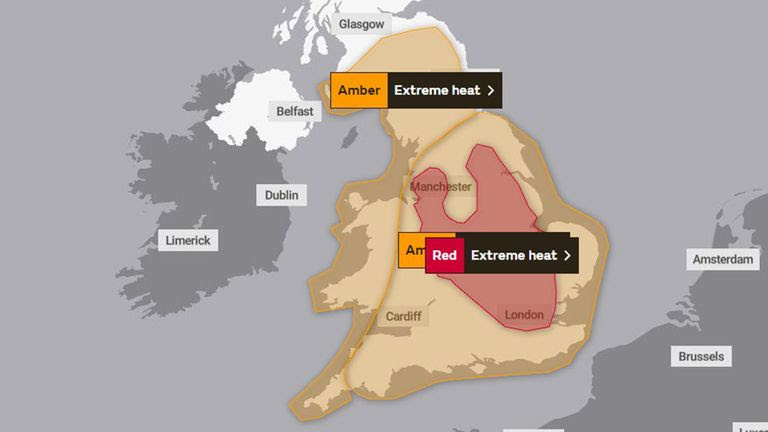
  Weather warnings in the UK on 18 July 2022
- 18 July
  - 2022 United Kingdom heatwaves: The hottest day of the year is recorded by the Met Office, with a temperature of 38.1 °C (100.6 °F) in Santon Downham.
  - September 2022 Conservative Party leadership election: Tom Tugendhat is eliminated in the third round of the MPs' ballot, with Rishi Sunak leading the votes.
  - The Johnson Government wins a House of Commons vote of confidence by 349 votes to 238 – a majority of 111.
  - Wild bison are reintroduced in the UK for the first time in thousands of years. Three of the animals are allowed to roam in the Kent countryside, where it is hoped they could improve the local ecology.
  - The world's largest automated drone superhighway is announced by Business Secretary Kwasi Kwarteng, connecting several towns across the Midlands, southern, and eastern England.
- 19 July
  - 2022 United Kingdom heatwaves:
    - A temperature above 40 °C is recorded for the first time in the UK, with a provisional Met Office reading of 40.3 °C at Coningsby, Lincolnshire beating the previous record high of 38.7 °C set in Cambridge in July 2019. A record night-time temperature is also recorded for 18–19 July, with 25.9 °C at Emley Moor, West Yorkshire. This is an increase of 2 °C from the previous record, set in Brighton in August 1990. Temperatures in many other parts of the country did not fall below 25 °C, giving the UK its warmest tropical night on record.
    - A major incident is declared in London, with more than 250 firefighters battling grassfires in the east and south of the capital. As a result, London Fire Brigade has its busiest day since World War Two.
  - September 2022 Conservative Party leadership election: Kemi Badenoch is eliminated in the fourth round of the MPs' ballot, with Rishi Sunak again topping the poll, and Liz Truss gaining ground on Penny Mordaunt.
- 20 July
  - Boris Johnson takes his final Prime Minister's Questions.
  - September 2022 Conservative Party leadership election: Penny Mordaunt is knocked out in the fifth and final round of the MPs' ballot, after Liz Truss overtakes her, leaving Rishi Sunak and Liz Truss to go head-to-head in a ballot of party members.
  - The Sizewell C nuclear power station receives government approval, with an estimated cost of £20 billion.
  - Inflation reaches 9.4%, up from 9.1% the previous month.
- 21 July
  - The UK's COVID-19 public inquiry launches with chair Baroness Hallett promising a robust look into the UK's handling of the pandemic and whether more could have been done.
  - A potential cure for haemophilia B is announced by British doctors, which corrects the genetic defect associated with the condition.
- 22 July – COVID-19 in the UK: The latest Office for National Statistics data for the week ending 15 July shows 3.8 million COVID-19 infections in the UK, a rise of 7% on the previous week. The ONS figures show a slow in the growth of cases while data from other sources, such as the government's COVID-19 Dashboard, suggest the latest wave has already reached its peak.
- 25 July – It is confirmed that the 2023 Eurovision Song Contest will be held in the UK as Ukraine is unable to host it because of the ongoing conflict with Russia.
- 26 July
  - A Conservative leadership debate on TalkTV between Rishi Sunak and Liz Truss is halted after presenter Kate McCann faints on air.
  - The Met Office reports that the period between January and June was the driest since 1976, as the government meets with water companies to discuss the protection of supplies.
  - UEFA Women's Euro 2022: England win their semi-final match against Sweden 4–0.
- 27 July
  - Progress towards a pan coronavirus vaccine is announced by the Francis Crick Institute in London, following tests on mice. Antibodies targeting the S2 subunit of SARS-CoV-2's spike protein are found to neutralise multiple coronavirus variants.
  - National Rail staff hold strikes in a dispute over pay, affecting many services across the UK, with further industrial action the following day and on 30 July.
- 28 July
  - TV cameras are allowed into crown courts such as the Old Bailey for the first time in England and Wales, though only to film judges handing down sentences to convicted criminals.
  - The 2022 Commonwealth Games begin in Birmingham.
- 29 July
  - Rebekah Vardy loses her libel case against Coleen Rooney, bringing the "Wagatha Christie" trial to an end.
  - COVID-19 in the UK: Office for National Statistics data for the week up to 20 July indicates 3.2 million people in the UK were infected with COVID-19, a fall from 3.8 million the previous week and suggesting cases in the latest wave have peaked.
- 30 July – Rail passengers face more disruption as train drivers at seven companies walk out in a dispute over pay. Almost a quarter of Great Britain's rail network is affected.
- 31 July – England win UEFA Women's Euro 2022, beating Germany 2–1; the winning goals are scored by Ella Toone and Chloe Kelly. It is England's first major football victory since the 1966 men's FIFA World Cup.

=== August ===
- 1 August – The Hinkley Point B nuclear power station in Somerset reaches the end of its working life.
- 2 August – A man allegedly found with a crossbow in the grounds of Windsor Castle on Christmas Day 2021 is charged under the 1842 Treason Act with threatening to alarm or injure the Queen.
- 3 August
  - As a prolonged dry spell continues in Southern England, a hosepipe ban is announced for Kent and Sussex from 12 August.
  - Marks and Spencer announces that it will stop selling disposable barbecues "to help protect open spaces and reduce the risk of fires".
  - Sir Patrick Vallance, the UK Government's Chief Scientific Adviser who helped steer the UK through the COVID-19 pandemic, announces he will step down from the role in April 2023.
- 4 August – The Bank of England raises its base interest rate from 1.25% to 1.75%, the biggest increase in 27 years. The Bank also warns that inflation could reach 13% later in the year and that the British economy may enter a recession.
- 5 August
  - Network Rail management staff belonging to the Transport Salaried Staffs' Association vote to accept a 4% pay rise.
  - The Unite union announces that 1,900 workers at Felixstowe Docks, one of the UK's largest ports, will stage an eight-day strike from 21 August after rejecting a 7% pay rise from the Felixstowe Dock and Railway Company.
  - COVID-19 in the UK: The latest Office for National Statistics (ONS) data shows another drop in the number of people in the UK with COVID-19, with 2.6 million cases in the week up to 26 July, a fall of over half a million from 3.2 million the previous week.
  - It is confirmed that a software outage affecting some NHS services, such as NHS 111, the previous day was the result of software hackers.
- 6 August
  - 12-year-old Archie Battersbee dies after his life support machine is switched off, following a series of legal challenges by his parents attempting to keep him alive.
  - Former prime minister Gordon Brown, writing in The Observer, urges the government to introduce an emergency budget before the next round of energy price rises, in order to avoid "a financial timebomb [that] will explode for families in October".
- 8 August
  - England finish the 2022 Commonwealth Games in second place behind Australia with 176 medals, 97 of them gold, surpassing their 2014 total of 174.
  - As the UK prepares for another heatwave, the UK Health Security Agency issues a level 3 heat health alert for central and southern England effective from 9 to 13 August.
- 9 August – Thames Water announces plans to introduce a hosepipe ban for its 15 million customers, with a start date to be confirmed.
- 10 August
  - Consumer expert Martin Lewis warns that soaring energy bills are "a national crisis" on the scale of the COVID-19 pandemic and urges the government to do more to help people.
  - A meeting of the Joint Committee on Vaccination and Immunisation recommends an urgent polio vaccine booster campaign for children aged one to nine in London, following detection of the virus in 116 samples of wastewater.
  - One person is killed and three are injured during the Skye and Wester Ross attacks by a single individual.
- 11 August
  - The prime minister, chancellor, and business secretary meet representatives of energy companies to discuss the ongoing price rises, but the meeting concludes without any firm resolution.
  - The Met Office issues a fire severity alert over the coming weekend, warning there is an "exceptional" risk of fire spreading in some areas.
- 12 August
  - A drought is declared in large parts of Central, Southern and Eastern England.
  - The ONS reports that the UK economy shrank by 0.1% between April and June.
  - Tesco announces an increase in automated self-checkout services within its larger stores, following successful trials.
- 13 August – 2022 United Kingdom railway strikes: Members of the train drivers' union ASLEF stage a 24-hour strike, disrupting train services across much of the UK mainland, with some areas such as London and Birmingham running no trains at all.
- 14 August
  - 2022 United Kingdom heatwaves: The prolonged period of extreme heat across the UK draws to an end, with lower temperatures and thunderstorms in Scotland and Northern Ireland, which are forecast to spread into England and Wales the following day. Flash flooding is expected in some areas, due to the parched ground.
  - The Crown Prosecution Service confirms that six people who were charged with breaching lockdown rules after attending demonstrations in the wake of the March 2021 murder of Sarah Everard will not be prosecuted.
- 15 August
  - COVID-19 vaccination in the UK: The UK becomes the first country to approve an updated Moderna vaccine that offers protection against the original COVID-19 virus, as well as the Omicron variant.
  - The Cabinet Office announces the launch of an emergency warning system to send alerts about severe weather and other life-threatening events to mobile phones. The system will launch in October and cover England, Scotland and Wales.
  - Scotland becomes the first country in the world to make free sanitary products available to women after legislation passed by the Scottish Parliament comes into force.
- 16 August
  - Conservative MP William Wragg announces on Twitter that he is taking a break from his duties, due to severe depression and anxiety.
  - NHS England confirms it is extending its bowel cancer screening programme to all adults over the age of 58.
- 17 August
  - UK cost of living crisis: Inflation rises again, from 9.4% to 10.1%, driven by the ongoing surge in food and energy prices. It now stands at the highest level since February 1982.
  - Heavy rain brings flash flooding to southern England.
- 18 August
  - The first post-COVID A Level results are published in England, Wales and Northern Ireland, with the number of students receiving A* grades lower than in 2021, but higher than in 2019 when the last public examinations were sat; 36.4% of A Levels were marked at A* and A in 2022, compared with 44.8% in 2021.
  - The latest in a series of strikes is held by rail workers, with only 20% of train services running. RMT boss Mick Lynch warns that the dispute could go on "indefinitely" unless a pay settlement is reached.
  - Former SNP (now Independent) MP Margaret Ferrier pleads guilty to breaching COVID-19 rules after being told to self isolate in September 2020.
- 19 August
  - Tesco cancels all home deliveries scheduled for after 1pm, due to a technical fault, leading to thousands of complaints.
  - COVID-19 in the UK: The latest Office for National Statistics data, covering the first week of August, indicates that 1.7 million people had COVID-19, or one in 40.
  - A drought is declared in south west Wales, specifically in north Ceredigion, Teifi, Pembrokeshire, Carmarthen, Swansea, Llanelli, Neath Port Talbot and Bridgend.
- 20 August – A sixth one-day strike is held by railway workers belonging to the RMT union.
- 21 August – Dock workers at Felixstowe, which handles half of the UK's container cargo, walk out for eight days in a dispute over pay, their first strike in 30 years.
- 22 August
  - Olivia Pratt-Korbel, 9, is mistakenly shot by a masked gunman in Liverpool, and is pronounced dead later the same day. The intended target of the attack was a 35-year-old man who has criminal convictions for drug dealing and burglary.
  - Barristers in England and Wales vote overwhelmingly for an indefinite, uninterrupted strike to begin on 5 September, delaying thousands of cases.
  - The Liberal Democrats accuse water companies of failing to properly monitor sewage discharges at beaches, following pollution warnings at more than 40 locations the previous week.
  - Almost 1,300 migrants cross the English Channel in 27 boats, setting a new record for crossings in a single day.
  - A £5 billion class action claim against Sony is made at the Competition Appeal Tribunal, alleging that the PlayStation Store engages in monopolisation and price gouging.
- 23 August – A drought is declared in the West Midlands.
- 25 August
  - The Royal Entomological Society reports a huge recovery in the number of large blue butterflies in south-west England, following a successful conservation project. Estimated at 20,000 insects, this colony is now the largest in Europe.
  - Train drivers at Chiltern Railways, Northern Trains and TransPennine Express belonging to the ASLEF union vote to take strike action in a dispute over pay and conditions.
  - The first post-pandemic GCSE results are published, and highlight a difference in performance between the regions, with a third of exam results in London being top grades, while the number is a fifth in the north of England.
- 26 August
  - Ofgem announces an 80% rise in the price cap on household energy bills, from £1,971 to £3,549. Martin Lewis describes the increase as "catastrophic" and warns that people will die without more government help. The Chancellor, Nadhim Zahawi, acknowledges the seriousness of the situation and insists that "help is coming".
  - 115,000 postal workers at the Royal Mail stage a walk out in a dispute over pay, with additional strikes planned for 31 August 8 and 9 September.
  - 43 protestors are arrested during a Just Stop Oil protest and blockade in London.
- 29 August
  - The Notting Hill Carnival returns for the first time since 2019. The event is marred by a number of violent incidents, including the fatal stabbing of a 21-year-old man.
  - September 2022 Conservative Party leadership election: Liz Truss pulls out of a scheduled BBC One interview with Nick Robinson, saying she can no longer spare the time.
- 30 August
  - A drought is declared in South West England, covering Bristol, Somerset, South Gloucestershire, Dorset and parts of Wiltshire.
  - Eurostar announces it is to suspend train services between London and Disneyland Paris from 5 June 2023 to concentrate on its core routes.
- 31 August
  - Buckingham Palace confirms that the Queen will appoint the next Prime Minister at Balmoral, breaking with tradition by not returning to London to make the appointment.
  - Hornsea Project 2 becomes operational in the North Sea, with 165 turbines providing 1.4 GW, making it the world's biggest wind farm.
  - By the end of August, pound sterling has experienced its biggest monthly fall since 2016, sliding 5% against the US dollar to reach $1.16 on the currency markets.

=== September ===
- 1 September – In one of his last actions as prime minister, Johnson confirms that the government will provide £700 million in funding for the Sizewell C nuclear power station.
- 2 September
  - Sky News reports that a Cabinet minister and a senior Downing Street aide in the Johnson Government are facing allegations of sexual misconduct following claims made by two women at Westminster.
  - Following an 11-hour meeting between unions and council leaders hosted by First Minister Nicola Sturgeon in Edinburgh, unions call off school and bin strikes in Scotland.
  - Buckingham Palace confirms the Queen will miss the 2022 Braemar Games, which she was scheduled to attend the following day. Prince Charles will attend instead.
  - Extinction Rebellion stage a protest in the House of Commons, with three people gluing themselves together next to the Speaker's chair and demanding a "citizens' assembly" to discuss the climate crisis.
- 4 September – A 21-year-old man is arrested on suspicion of trespass after climbing The Shard in central London. Two other men are detained on suspicion of causing a public nuisance.
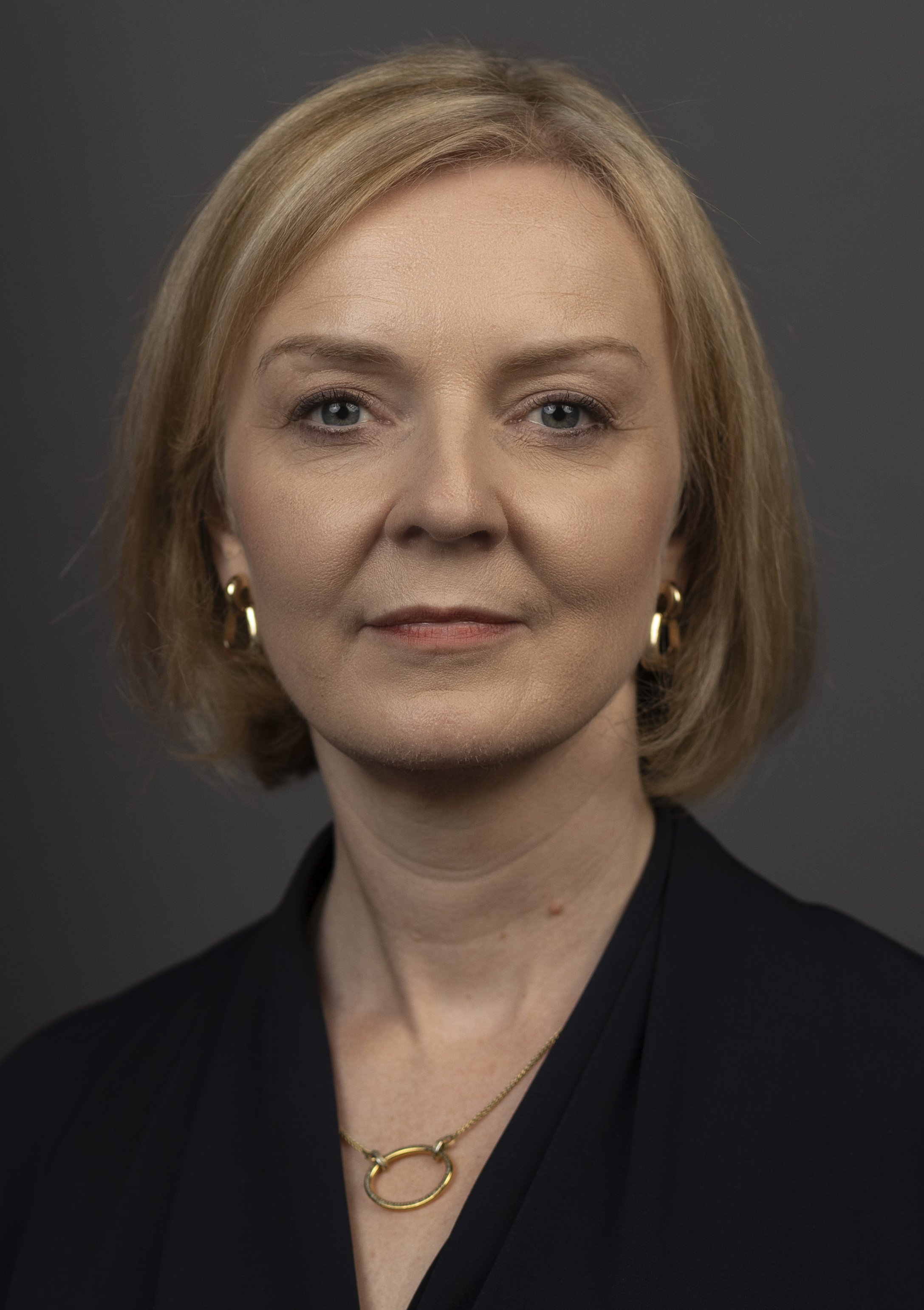
  New Leader of the Conservative Party and Prime Minister Liz Truss
- 5 September
  - September 2022 Conservative Party leadership election: Liz Truss is elected as the leader of the Conservative Party, beating Rishi Sunak, winning 57.4% of the members' vote to Sunak's 42.6%.
  - COVID-19 vaccination in the UK: An Autumn booster jab is offered to adults aged 50 and over, along with vulnerable groups, and key workers such as health staff. This is targeted to work against the Omicron variant.
- 6 September
  - Liz Truss becomes Prime Minister of the United Kingdom, and forms the Truss ministry.
  - For the first time in British political history, no white men hold positions in the Great Offices of State.
- 7 September
  - Truss faces her first Prime Minister's Questions in the House of Commons and is quizzed on her plans to tackle the energy crisis.
  - Buckingham Palace announces that the Queen has postponed an online meeting of the Privy Council after being advised to rest by doctors.

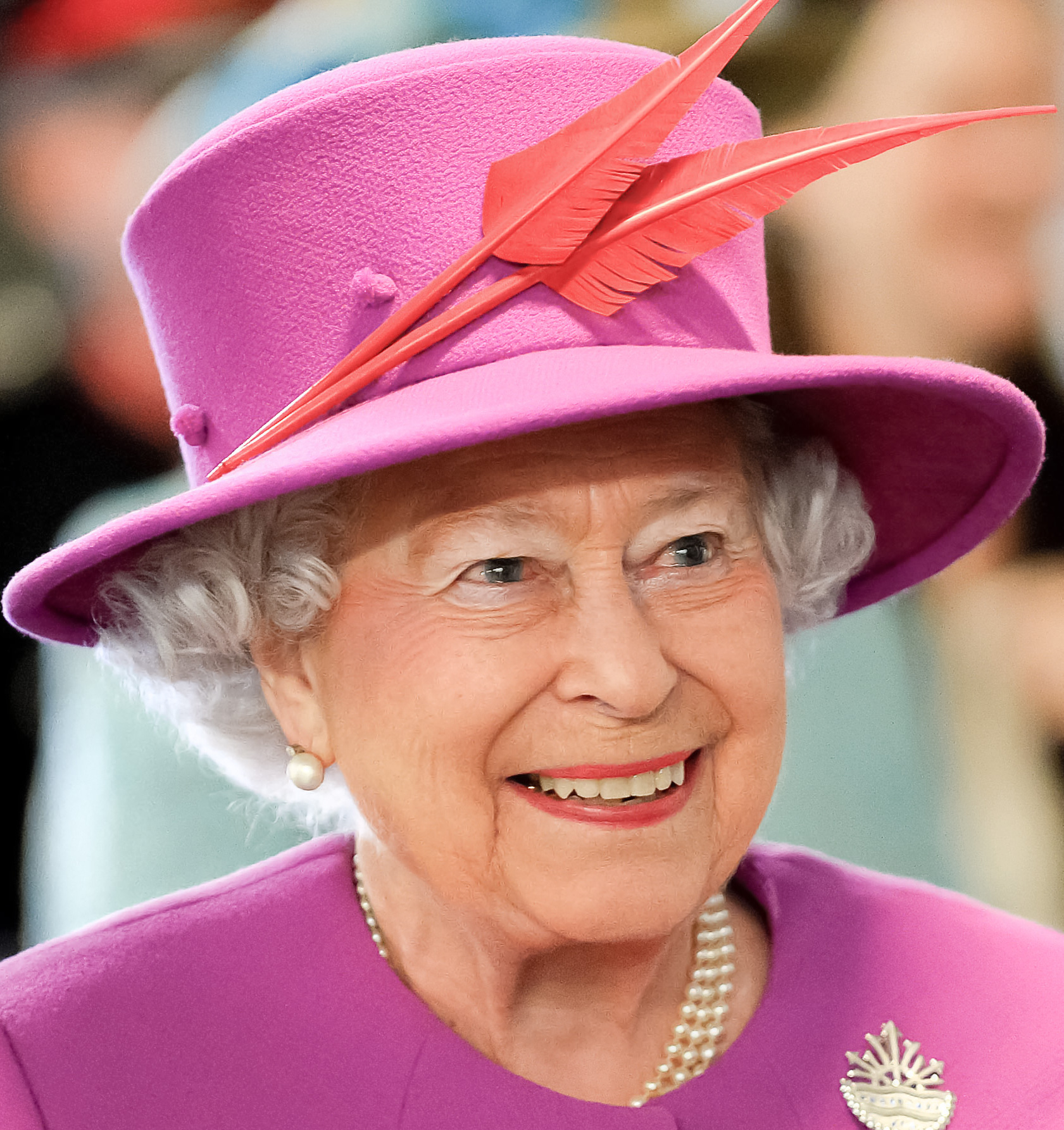
The Queen dies peacefully at the age of 96, after 70 years on the throne

- 8 September
  - Liz Truss announces plans to limit energy bills, with a bill for a typical household capped at £2,500 a year for the next two years. A new six month scheme to limit bills for businesses is also announced.
  - In the early afternoon, Buckingham Palace announces that the Queen is under medical supervision at Balmoral after doctors became concerned for her health. Senior members of the royal family travel to Balmoral to be with her.
  - Death of Elizabeth II: At 6:30 pm, Buckingham Palace announces that Queen Elizabeth II has died (at 3:10 pm) peacefully, aged 96.
  - Charles becomes King of the United Kingdom and head of the Commonwealth of Nations upon the death of his mother.
  - Following the announcement of the Queen's death, the RMT and ASLEF rail unions suspend strikes planned for 15 and 17 September. A Royal Mail strike planned for the following day is also suspended.
- 9 September
  - The House of Commons begins two days of tributes to the Queen, after which Parliament will be suspended until after 21 September. Liz Truss opens the proceedings by describing the late monarch as "one of the greatest leaders the world has known".
  - Across the country, members of the public leave flowers and tributes outside palaces and churches to mark the Queen's passing. Gun salutes are fired in many locations, including British overseas territories such as Gibraltar. King Charles III and Queen Camilla, meet crowds outside Buckingham Palace. In a televised address from inside the palace, Charles renews his mother's "lifelong promise of service", calling her his "darling mama". A service of prayer and reflection is later held at St Paul's Cathedral. The service closes with the first official singing of God Save the King in over 70 years.
  - A man is arrested at Birmingham Airport in connection with the 1996 Manchester IRA bombing.
- 10 September
  - Historic ceremonies take place at St James's Palace and the Royal Exchange, with Prince William, Queen Camilla, serving politicians and former prime ministers in attendance, as Charles III is formally proclaimed king.
  - Senior MPs, including Prime Minister Liz Truss, swear an Oath of Allegiance to Charles III in a special session of Parliament.
  - The UK Government announces that Monday 19 September, the date of the state funeral of Elizabeth II, will be a national bank holiday.
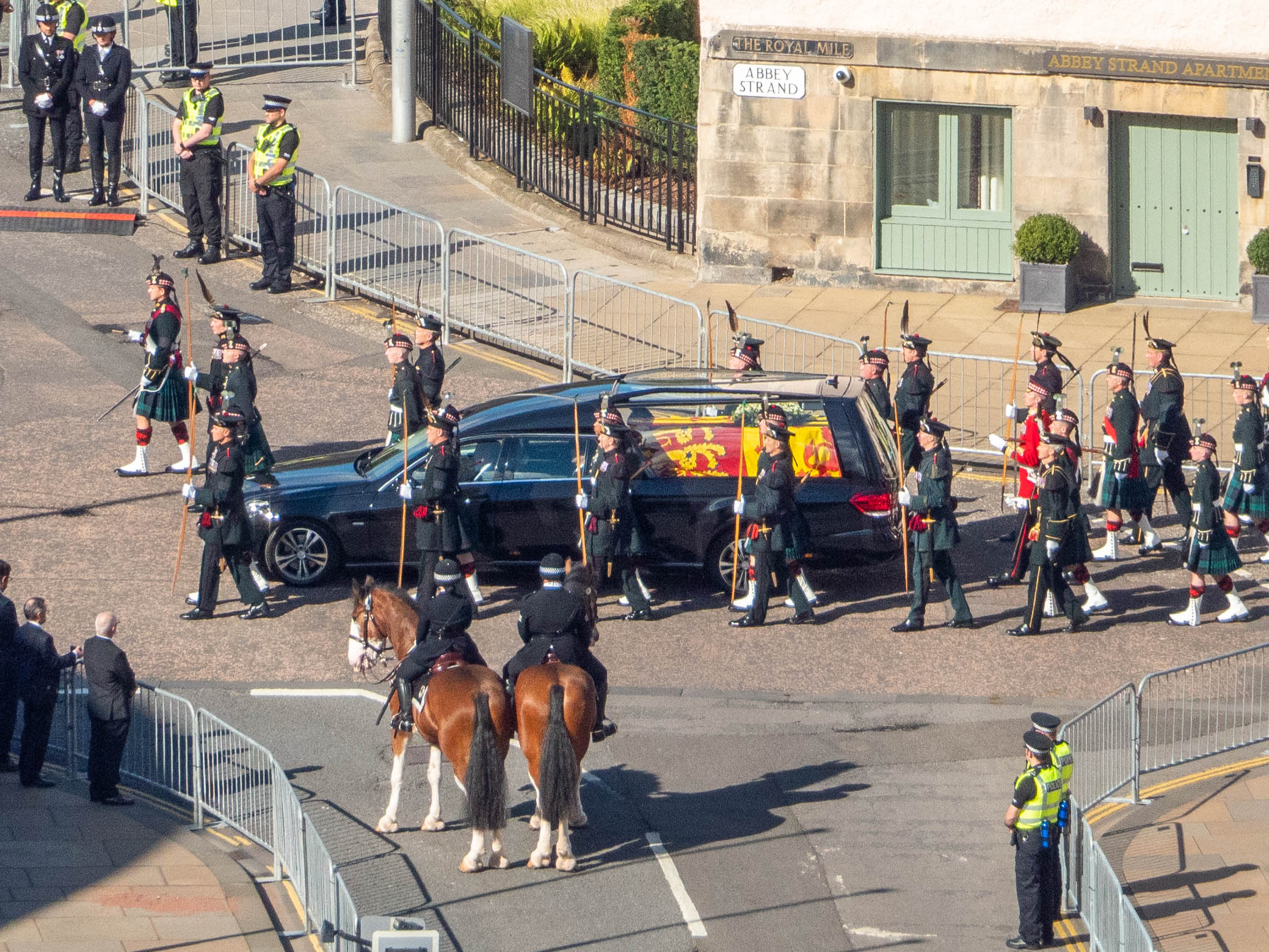
    During its time in Edinburgh, the Queen's Coffin is taken from Holyrood palace to St Giles' Cathedral
- 11 September – The Queen's coffin is delivered by hearse from Balmoral to Edinburgh. Silent onlookers throw floral tributes along the route, as the cortege makes a six-hour journey to the Palace of Holyroodhouse.
- 12 September
  - Charles III addresses Parliament as monarch for the first time, then travels to Edinburgh to lead a procession behind the Queen's coffin.
  - Addressing the Scottish Parliament, the King speaks of his 'great admiration' for Scotland.
  - COVID-19 in the UK: Data released by the Office for National Statistics indicates that cases of COVID-19 are at their lowest since October 2021, with fewer than a million people (roughly one in 70) with the virus in the last week of August.
- 13 September
  - About 33,000 people file through St Giles' Cathedral in Edinburgh, where the Queen lies at rest for 24 hours.
  - Later in the day, the Queen's coffin is flown to RAF Northolt before being transported to Buckingham Palace by hearse.
  - The King travels to Northern Ireland for a private meeting with senior politicians.
  - A 22-year-old man is charged in connection with a breach of the peace after the Duke of York was heckled as he walked behind the Queen's coffin in Edinburgh the previous day.
  - Margaret Ferrier, the MP who travelled by train from London to Scotland after receiving a positive COVID test in September 2020, is given 270 hours of community service after previously pleading guilty at Glasgow Sheriff Court to culpably and recklessly exposing the public to the virus.
- 14 September
  - The Queen's coffin is taken from Buckingham Palace's Bow Room, placed on a gun carriage of The King's Troop Royal Horse Artillery and moved in a procession to Westminster Hall for her lying in state. The first public mourners are then allowed to pay their respects. An estimated 400,000 people are expected to file past the coffin over the next four days, with queues of up to 30 hours stretching for miles along the River Thames.
  - Inflation falls slightly, from 10.1% the previous month to 9.9%. Food price inflation continues to be rapid, reaching a 14-year high of 13.1%, but is outweighed in the annual index by a drop in the cost of motor fuels.
- 16 September
  - King Charles and Queen Camilla visit Cardiff for a service at Llandaff Cathedral. The King addresses the Senedd in Welsh and English before attending a Welsh Government reception at Cardiff Castle.
  - The queue to see the Queen lying in state at Westminster Hall is paused for several hours, after Southwark Park – the end of the five-mile queue – reaches capacity.
  - A man is arrested under the Public Order Act after running up the steps to the catafalque and touching the Queen's coffin.
  - The pound falls more than 1% against the U.S. dollar and reaches a new 37-year low of $1.13, amid concerns over poor retail figures.
  - Two police officers are stabbed in central London, leaving one with a potentially life-changing injury and the other with neck and chest wounds. A man is arrested on suspicion of grievous bodily harm and assaulting an emergency worker. The attack is not terror-related or connected to the Queen's death.
- 17 September – The King and Prince William greet some of those queuing outside Westminster Hall. Later, a vigil is held around the coffin by the Queen's grandchildren.
- 18 September
  - In a pre-recorded television address, Queen Camilla pays tribute to Queen Elizabeth II who she describes as being in the "difficult position" of being a "solitary woman" in a male-dominated world.
  - At 8.00pm the UK holds a minute's silence in honour of the Queen.
  - Large-scale disorder breaks out in Leicester, amid tensions involving mainly young men from sections of the Muslim and Hindu communities.
- 19 September – State funeral of Elizabeth II: At 6.30am, public viewing of the Queen's lying-in-state comes to an end. At 8am, the funeral congregation which includes around 100 presidents and heads of government from around the world begins to gather nearby at Westminster Abbey. At 10:30, the Queen's coffin is delivered by gun carriage from Westminster Hall to the abbey, followed inside by the King and other members of the royal family. A service is then held from 11:00 to 12:15, watched by a global audience estimated in the billions. The coffin is then drawn in a 1.5-mile walking procession to Wellington Arch, with crowds of mourners packing the streets of central London, arriving at 13:00. It is then transferred to a hearse, for delivery to Windsor Castle and a committal service at St George's chapel. This is followed by a private ceremony attended by her family in the King George VI Memorial chapel. The Queen is buried alongside her husband, the Duke of Edinburgh.
- 21 September – The government announces a scheme that will freeze wholesale gas and electricity prices for businesses for six months from 1 October.
- 22 September
  - The government reverses the ban on fracking in England.
  - UK interest rates rise from 1.75 to 2.25%, the biggest increase in 27 years, as the Bank of England attempts to curb inflation.
  - The UK government announces a 1.25% rise in National Insurance contributions will be reversed from 6 November. The planned Health and Social Care Levy will also be scrapped.
- 23 September
  - Chancellor Kwasi Kwarteng delivers an emergency mini-budget in which he announces the biggest tax cuts in the UK since 1972. The 45% top rate of income tax, paid by only the highest earners in England Wales and Northern Ireland, will be scrapped, while the basic rate in England, Wales and Northern Ireland will be reduced from 20% to 19%. The cap on bankers' bonuses is lifted, and a planned rise in corporation tax is also scrapped. An increase in National Insurance is reversed, while the threshold before stamp duty is paid in England and Northern Ireland is raised to £425,000 for first time buyers and £250,000 for everyone else.
  - Scotland's First Minister, Nicola Sturgeon, hints that she is unlikely to match income tax cuts for the highest earners elsewhere in the UK, describing the mini-budget as "reckless".
  - Pound sterling falls sharply in response to the government's planned tax cuts, losing 3% against the dollar and dropping below $1.09.
  - COVID-19 in the UK: Office for National Statistics data for the week up to 14 September indicates the first rise in COVID-19 infections since mid-July, with one in 70 people having the virus and the largest increase among secondary school students.
- 26 September
  - Pound sterling falls again, briefly hitting an all-time low against the dollar of $1.03, before recovering slightly to $1.07.
  - EasyJet announces a plan to reach net zero by 2050.
- 27 September
  - The royal coat of arms is amended. The Tudor Crown will now be used in place of the St Edward's Crown in England, Wales and Northern Ireland. While Scotland continues to use the Crown of Scotland on the head of the unicorn, while replacing the St. Edward's Crown with the Tudor Crown on the Lion's head, in all depictions of the royal arms.
  - The royal cypher of King Charles III, featuring the Tudor Crown, is unveiled. A separate version for Scotland features the Crown of Scotland.
  - Sir Keir Starmer delivers his speech at the Labour Party Conference in Liverpool, presenting his vision for a "fairer, greener Britain". Alongside a boost in NHS funding, this plan would include a new publicly owned company, Great British Energy, and a target for 100% of the country's electricity being from zero carbon sources by 2030.
- 28 September
  - The International Monetary Fund makes an unprecedented criticism of UK fiscal policy, urging the government to re-evaluate the mini-budget.
  - In a bid to prevent the collapse of the country's pension funds, whose investments are in government bonds that have become volatile since the announcement of the mini-budget, the Bank of England announces that it will purchase £65 billion of government bonds in order to restore their stability.
  - More than 1,000 mortgage products are withdrawn from the market, the highest figure ever recorded by Moneyfacts Group, with many borrowers unable to secure loans or having provisional offers declined.
- 30 September
  - Human remains are discovered on Saddleworth Moor, which Greater Manchester Police believe could be the body of Moors murderers victim Keith Bennett, killed by Ian Brady and Myra Hindley in 1964.
  - The Royal Mint unveils the new coin design effigy of King Charles III. A new 50p and a commemorative £5 Crown are the first coins to feature the new portrait by Martin Jennings.

=== October ===
- 1 October
  - More than 50,000 rail workers go on a 24-hour strike, the biggest of the year to date, with only 11% of train services running in the UK.
  - Thousands of people around the UK attend a series of simultaneous protests against the cost of living crisis, timed to coincide with the jump in gas and electricity unit prices.
- 3 October – Following a backlash, the government announces the cancellation of their plan to abolish the highest income tax band.
- 4 October – The first preliminary hearing of the COVID-19 inquiry is held. Chair Baroness Hallett says those who have suffered will be at the inquiry's heart.
- 5 October
  - Train drivers hold another day of strikes, with 9,000 members of ASLEF staging a 24-hour walkout.
  - Liz Truss makes her first Conservative Party Conference speech as prime minister, saying she is focused on "growth, growth, growth" and decrying what she calls an "anti-growth coalition". The event is interrupted by protesters from Greenpeace.
- 6 October – Four people are injured, with three taken to hospital, following a street robbery and stabbing near Liverpool Street station in the heart of London's financial district. Police establish a cordon at the junction of Bishopsgate and Camomile Street but say the attack is not terror-related.
- 7 October
  - COVID-19 in the UK: Office for National Statistics data from tests conducted two weeks ago suggests around 1.3 million people (or one in 50) were infected with COVID-19, with a high prevalence in those aged over 70. The news prompts health experts to urge people to avoid contact with vulnerable friends, relatives and colleagues as a precaution.
  - Trade minister Conor Burns is dismissed from the government, following allegations of inappropriate behaviour at the Conservative Party Conference.
- 8 October – Another strike is held by rail workers, with only 20% of services running.
- 10 October – The UK imposes sanctions on Iran's morality police, along with five leading political and security officials, following the death of Mahsa Amini.
- 11 October – The Bank of England warns of a "material risk" to financial stability, as the government's borrowing costs rise sharply again.
- 12 October – The Crown Dependency of Guernsey will issue Guernsey Post stamps featuring the Royal cypher of King Charles III from November.
- 14 October
  - Kwasi Kwarteng is dismissed as Chancellor of the Exchequer. He becomes the second shortest-serving Chancellor in UK political history, after Iain Macleod who died of a heart attack in 1970. Jeremy Hunt succeeds him.
  - In a Downing Street press conference, Truss confirms a reversal of her plan to scrap an increase in corporation tax and admits "it is clear that parts of our mini-budget went further and faster than markets were expecting."
  - Just Stop Oil protesters throw tomato soup over Vincent van Gogh's 1888 masterpiece, Sunflowers, in the National Gallery. The rotating sign outside Scotland Yard is also spray painted orange. More than 20 arrests are made.
  - Royal Mail announces plans to axe 10,000 jobs, blaming ongoing strike action and rising financial losses.
  - Battersea Power Station opens to the public for the first time in 40 years.
  - COVID-19 in the UK: The latest COVID-19 data from the Office for National Statistics suggests 1.7 million people (roughly 2.7% of the population or one in 37) is infected with COVID-19, a rise from the previous week when the figure was one in 50.
- 15 October – The delayed 2021 Rugby League World Cup begins.
- 17 October – The new Chancellor, Jeremy Hunt, delivers an emergency statement to the Commons, in which he announces that the government "will reverse almost all the tax measures" from the mini-budget. The reconfigured budget will raise £32bn, out of the £70bn needed to close the funding gap.
- 19 October
  - Truss takes her first Prime Minister's Questions after cancelling most of the mini-budget. She tells the Commons she is "completely committed" to raising pensions in line with inflation, per the "triple lock" guarantee.
  - Suella Braverman resigns as Home Secretary after sending an official document from her personal email to a fellow MP, a serious breach of ministerial rules. She is succeeded by Grant Shapps.
  - The government wins a vote on its fracking plans by 326 to 230, a majority of 96. The vote is characterised as 'chaotic', with Conservative MPs unsure whether the vote would be treated as a vote of confidence in the government, and MPs alleging that bullying and manhandling took place in the voting lobby. However, ministers deny these claims, with Business Secretary Jacob Rees-Mogg saying to "characterise it as bullying was mistaken".
  - Inflation in September rises slightly, back to its July level of 10.1%, up from 9.9% in August.
- 20 October – Liz Truss announces her pending resignation as Prime Minister after just 45 days. Her tenure will be the shortest of any Prime Minister in UK history. Her successor will be elected in a Conservative leadership contest, to be completed in the next week.
- 21 October
  - The parliamentary watchdog finds that Labour MP Christian Matheson should be suspended from the Commons for four weeks for "serious sexual misconduct". He subsequently resigns from his Chester seat.
  - October 2022 Conservative Party leadership election: Penny Mordaunt becomes the first MP to announce their candidacy.
- 23 October
  - October 2022 Conservative Party leadership election:
    - Rishi Sunak announces his candidacy for the leadership election and is reported to have secured the required number of more than 100 nominations from MPs.
    - Boris Johnson announces that he will not stand for re-election as PM and Conservative leader, despite being widely expected to do so, saying it would "not be the right thing to do. You can't govern effectively unless you have a united party in parliament."
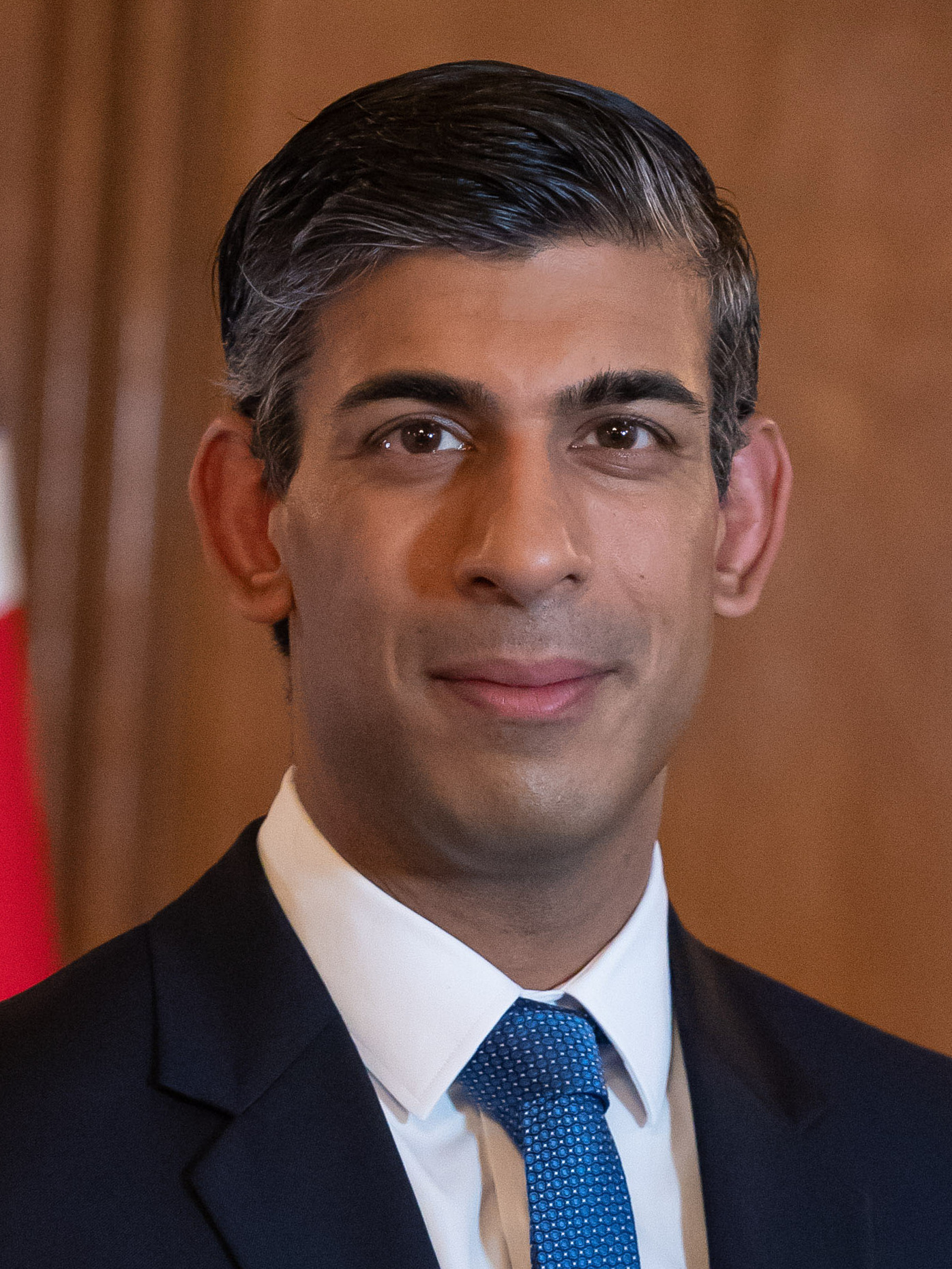
      New Leader of the Conservative Party and prime minister Rishi Sunak
- 24 October
  - October 2022 Conservative Party leadership election: Rishi Sunak becomes the new Leader of the Conservative Party, and the Prime minister–designate, after Penny Mordaunt, the only other contender, drops out of the leadership contest. Upon taking over from Liz Truss, he will be the UK's first British Asian Prime Minister, and at 42 the country's youngest leader in over 200 years.
  - The NHS launches 'Our Future Health', one of the world's largest health and genetic data gathering projects, aimed at creating a long-term repository of information for researchers. Five million UK adults are invited to participate.
- 25 October
  - Liz Truss makes her final speech outside 10 Downing Street, in which she defends her economic policies and insists that "brighter days lie ahead" for the UK.
  - Rishi Sunak officially becomes Prime Minister as the King asks him to form a new government. In his first speech, Sunak pays tribute to his predecessors, but acknowledges that "some mistakes were made". He promises to "place economic stability and confidence at the heart of this government's agenda".
- 26 October
  - Sunak takes his first Prime Minister's Questions. Opposition MPs question his appointment of Suella Braverman as Home Secretary, given her resignation over a data breach the previous week. Sunak defends his choice, explaining that "the Home Secretary made an error of judgment but she recognised that she raised the matter and she accepted her mistake."
  - Sunak reimposes a ban on fracking in the UK, undoing the plan by Liz Truss, and in line with the Conservative Party's original election manifesto of 2019.
  - More than a dozen protesters from Just Stop Oil are arrested after blocking Piccadilly in central London and spray painting luxury car showrooms in nearby Mayfair.
- 28 October
  - The first televised sentencing at a murder trial in England and Wales takes place at the Old Bailey. This follows the first televised manslaughter sentencing on 28 July. Jemma Mitchell, 38, is given a minimum term of 34 years for killing and decapitating 67-year-old Mee Kuen Chong at her London home in June 2021.
  - COVID-19 in the UK: Office for National Statistics data for the week ending 17 October indicates around two million COVID-19 infections in the UK, roughly one in 30 people with the virus. These figures are relatively similar to those for the previous week.
  - The Royal Mint begins manufacturing coins featuring the new effigy of King Charles III.
- 29 October – The Mail on Sunday alleges that Russian spies gained access to Liz Truss's phone during her time as foreign secretary, and that the details were suppressed by then-prime minister Boris Johnson and cabinet secretary Simon Case.
- 30 October – A man kills himself after throwing incendiary devices at a Border Force processing centre in Dover, Kent, where asylum seekers are taken after being rescued in the English Channel.
- 31 October
  - Just Stop Oil activists target buildings used by the Home Office, MI5, the Bank of England and News Corp, spraying orange paint on each and demanding an end to new oil and gas licences.
  - 2022 Kirkton riot: A riot breaks out in Kirkton, Dundee which leads to several injuries and 33 charged.

=== November ===
- 1 November
  - Primark reopens its shop at the historic Bank Buildings in Belfast after undergoing a four-year restoration following a major fire in August 2018.
  - Former Health Secretary Matt Hancock is suspended from the Conservative Party after joining the cast of I'm a Celebrity...Get Me Out of Here!. He will now sit as an independent MP.
- 3 November
  - The Bank of England raises interest rates by 0.75 percentage points to 3%, the biggest hike since 1989, and forecasts a recession until 2024.
  - After a year's delay, the Wheelchair Rugby League World Cup begins in England.
- 4 November
  - Northern Ireland Secretary Chris Heaton-Harris indefinitely postpones plans for a snap Northern Ireland Assembly election.
  - COVID-19 in the UK: The latest Office for National Statistics data indicates there were 1.9 million COVID-19 cases in the week up to 24 October, with around one in 35 people having the virus. Cases in England and Wales fell from the previous week, while there was a slight rise in Northern Ireland, with figures uncertain for Scotland.
- 7 November
  - Multiple junctions of the M25 are closed as Just Stop Oil stage their latest protests.
  - The world's first clinical trial of laboratory grown red blood cells transfused into people begins at the University of Bristol.
- 8 November – Sir Gavin Williamson resigns as Minister of State without Portfolio after allegations of bullying were made against him.
- 11 November
  - ONS figures show that the UK economy shrank by 0.2% in the three months to September.
  - COVID-19 in the UK: The latest Office for National Statistics data indicates a general fall in the number of cases of COVID-19 in the UK, with 1.5 million people testing positive for the virus in the week up to 1 November. This represents an 18% fall on the previous week, and appears to indicate the latest wave of cases is receding.
- 14 November – The UK agrees a revised deal with France to try to reduce the number of migrants and asylum seekers crossing the English Channel in small boats. UK police officers will work with French authorities in control rooms and on beaches, with officer numbers patrolling the French coast increasing from 200 to 300; the UK will pay France £63m this year, up from £55m last year.
- 16 November
  - Inflation reaches 11.1% for October, up from 10.1% the previous month. Food price inflation is even higher, rising from 14.6% to 16.4%, its highest level since 1977.
  - The Civil Aviation Authority grants an operating licence to Spaceport Cornwall, enabling the first satellite launches from the UK.
- 17 November – The Chancellor, Jeremy Hunt, delivers his autumn statement to the House of Commons.
- 18 November – COVID-19 in the UK: Data released by the Office for National Statistics for the week up to 8 November indicate 1.1 million people tested positive for COVID-19, a 27% fall from 1.5 million the previous week. In England the number of cases is shown as being under a million for the first time since September.
- 19 November – Gareth Swarbrick, CEO of Rochdale Boroughwide Housing, is sacked with immediate effect, following the death of two-year-old Awaab Ishak in a mould-ridden flat.
- 21 November – England and Wales play their first matches at the 2022 FIFA World Cup in Qatar, the latter having qualified for the first time in 64 years.
- 23 November
  - The Supreme Court rules that the Scottish Government cannot hold a second Scottish independence referendum without the UK government's consent.
  - More than 100 people are arrested in the UK's biggest ever fraud operation, centred around the 'iSpoof' website, which targeted over 200,000 potential victims and pretended to be a bank.
- 24 November
  - Net migration into the UK hits an all-time high of 504,000 in the year to June, partly driven by the Russian invasion of Ukraine, those fleeing persecution in Hong Kong, and the resettlement of Afghan refugees.
  - A ten-fold increase in hospitalisation from influenza is reported, compared to the same period a year previously. NHS bosses urge the public to get the latest vaccines for both flu and COVID-19.
- 25 November
  - The Royal College of Nursing announces that nurses across England, Wales and Northern Ireland will stage their biggest strike in NHS history, in a dispute over pay, on 15 and 20 December.
  - Sadiq Khan announces a plan to expand the Ultra Low Emission Zone to cover the whole of Greater London from August 2023.
  - Serial burglar Danville Neil is sentenced to life imprisonment for the 1993 murders of Anne Castle and William Bryan.
- 26 November
  - The latest in a long-running series of train strikes is held across the UK, with train drivers at 11 companies walking out in a dispute over pay.
  - An independent review into the London Fire Brigade finds an "institutionally misogynist and racist" culture within the organisation.
- 29 November
  - The proportion of people in England and Wales describing themselves as Christian falls below half for the first time, according to data released from the ONS.
  - 600,000 of the approximately 1.3 million free range turkeys in the UK are reported to have died or been culled, due to bird flu.

=== December ===
- 1 December
  - Ian Blackford announces he is stepping down as head of the SNP in Westminster. He will be succeeded by Stephen Flynn.
  - 2022 City of Chester by-election: Labour hold the City of Chester with a 61% vote share in the first by-election of Rishi Sunak's premiership. Samantha Dixon is elected with a 10,974 majority, Labour's best ever result in the seat.
- 2 December
  - COVID-19 in the UK: Office for National Statistics (ONS) data for the week up to 21 November indicates COVID-19 infections in the UK have risen above one million again following a 6% increase from 972,400 the previous week. Infections have also risen in England for the first time since mid-October.
  - The UK Health Security Agency reports a string of recent deaths among children who caught Group A streptococcal infection, with five children confirmed to have died in England and one in Wales. Three further deaths are reported on 5–6 December.
  - Prince William announces the five winners of his Earthshot Prize environmental initiative.
- 7 December – The government approves Woodhouse Colliery, the UK's first new coal mine in decades, despite concerns about the climate impact.
- 8 December – The country enters a cold spell bringing some of the lowest temperatures recorded since the winter of 2010-11.
- 9 December
  - Royal Mail workers begin a wave of strikes in the run-up to Christmas, with more than 115,000 staff walking out in a dispute over pay and conditions.
  - Santander are fined £107.8m by the Financial Conduct Authority over "serious and persistent gaps" in its anti-money laundering controls which enabled "financial crime".
  - Jeremy Hunt announces the Edinburgh Reforms, the biggest overhaul of financial regulation since the Big Bang of the 1980s, a package of more than 30 actions designed to "cut red tape" and "turbocharge growth". Critics warn that the measures risk a repeat of the 2008 financial crisis.
  - The government announces a collaboration between the UK, Italy and Japan to develop the Tempest, a new fighter jet using artificial intelligence. It will replace the Typhoon and enter service in 2035.
  - COVID-19 in the UK: The latest Office for National Statistics data indicates 1.1 million tested positive for COVID-19 in the week up to 26 November, roughly 1.7% of the population. The data also shows the number of cases has increased slightly in England and Northern Ireland, but not in Scotland and Wales.
- 10 December – Ten people are killed by a gas explosion in St Helier, Jersey.
- 11 December
  - Four boys aged 6, 8, 10 and 11, are taken to hospital in critical condition after being rescued when they fell through ice at Babbs Mill Lake in Birmingham, but are unable to be revived.
  - The UK experiences its coldest night of the year so far, with heavy snowfall in many places, and temperatures as low as −15.6 °C in Scotland.
  - Irish becomes an official language and Ulster Scots becomes a recognised language of the United Kingdom.
- 12 December – The UK's coldest day since December 2010 is provisionally recorded by the Met Office, with Braemar in Aberdeenshire remaining consistently below −9.3 °C (15 °F).
- 13 December
  - An even colder temperature low of −17.3 °C is recorded overnight, once again in Braemar, Aberdeenshire. About 3,800 homes are left without power in Shetland, following heavy snow.
  - The latest in a series of train strikes is held, after members of the RMT union reject a new pay offer. Additional strikes are planned for 14, 16, and 17 December.
  - The Newborn Genomes Programme is announced by the government. It will conduct whole genome sequencing of 100,000 newborns, the largest study of its kind in the world, to aid research into the diagnosis and treatment of rare genetic conditions.
- 14 December
  - Four people die and more than 40 are rescued after a small boat carrying migrants begins sinking in ice-cold waters off the coast of Dungeness in the middle of the night.
  - Following previous allegations of bullying by Deputy Prime Minister Dominic Raab, five further complaints are investigated, taking the total number to eight.
  - At the Old Bailey, Jordan McSweeney is jailed for a minimum of 38 years for the murder and sexual assault of Zara Aleena in Ilford, East London.
- 15 December
  - Nurses in England, Wales and Northern Ireland hold the biggest strike in NHS history, as they demand a 19% pay increase. A second strike is planned for 20 December.
  - 2022 Stretford and Urmston by-election: Labour hold the constituency with a 69.6% vote share, their best ever result in the seat, but turnout is just 25.8%. Andrew Western is the newly elected MP.
  - The Bank of England raises its baseline interest rate from 3% to 3.5%, the highest level in 14 years.
- 16 December – A rapid surge in flu is reported, with hospital admissions from the virus overtaking those of COVID-19.
- 17 December – A woman dies and two others remain critically injured following a crowd crush at London's Brixton Academy two days previously.
- 19 December
  - Rwanda asylum plan: The High Court rules that the British government's plan to send asylum seekers to Rwanda while their application is ongoing is lawful.
  - The Independent Press Standards Organisation receives more than 20,000 complaints following an article by Jeremy Clarkson in The Sun.
  - A second person, a security worker, dies following the crowd crush at London's Brixton Academy on 15 December.
- 20 December – The Bank of England unveils a new look to the Series G banknotes featuring King Charles III. No additional changes will be made to the existing designs of £5, £10, £20 and £50 notes, which will enter circulation from mid-2024.
- 21 December – Ambulance workers go on strike across much of England and Wales.
- 23 December
  - Border Force staff, who are members of the Public and Commercial Services Union (PCS), go on strike for eight days until 31 December, except on 27 December.
  - The first male European bison joins an all-female herd as part of the Wilder Blean project in Kent, an effort to reintroduce the animals in the United Kingdom after 12,000 years.
- 24 December – Wallasey pub shooting: Five people are shot at a pub in Merseyside, resulting in the death of a 26-year-old woman and four men injured, one critically. A man and a woman are arrested three days later in connection with the shooting.
- 25 December – King Charles praises "wonderfully kind people" helping those in need and sympathises with struggling families in his first Christmas broadcast.
- 29 December – COVID-19 in the UK: Following China's recent decision to end its zero-COVID policy, Defence Secretary Ben Wallace says the possibility of imposing restrictions on visitors from the country is 'under review'. The following day, it is confirmed that passengers arriving in England from China will have to provide a negative test before they board a flight.

== See also ==
- Politics in the United Kingdom
- 2020s in United Kingdom political history
- 2022 in United Kingdom politics and government
- Timeline of the COVID-19 pandemic in the United Kingdom (January–June 2022)
- Timeline of the COVID-19 pandemic in the United Kingdom (July–December 2022)
- 2022 in British music
- 2022 in British television
- List of British films of 2022

=== External links ===
- The UK year in pictures (BBC News)
- 2022 in review: Three prime ministers, the death of a monarch and war in Europe (Sky News) - Most of the content is UK based or related but some international news stories are mentioned.
