= December 2022 United Kingdom and Ireland cold wave =

British weather in 2022

A spell of unseasonably cold weather affected the United Kingdom and Ireland between 8 December and 18 December 2022. It was considered to be one of the most significant spells of low temperatures since the winter of 2010–11, with overnight temperatures widely falling below −10 °C (14 °F) on several occasions. Heavy snowfall also affected large parts of the country, resulting in travel disruption, power outages, and school closures.

== Overview ==
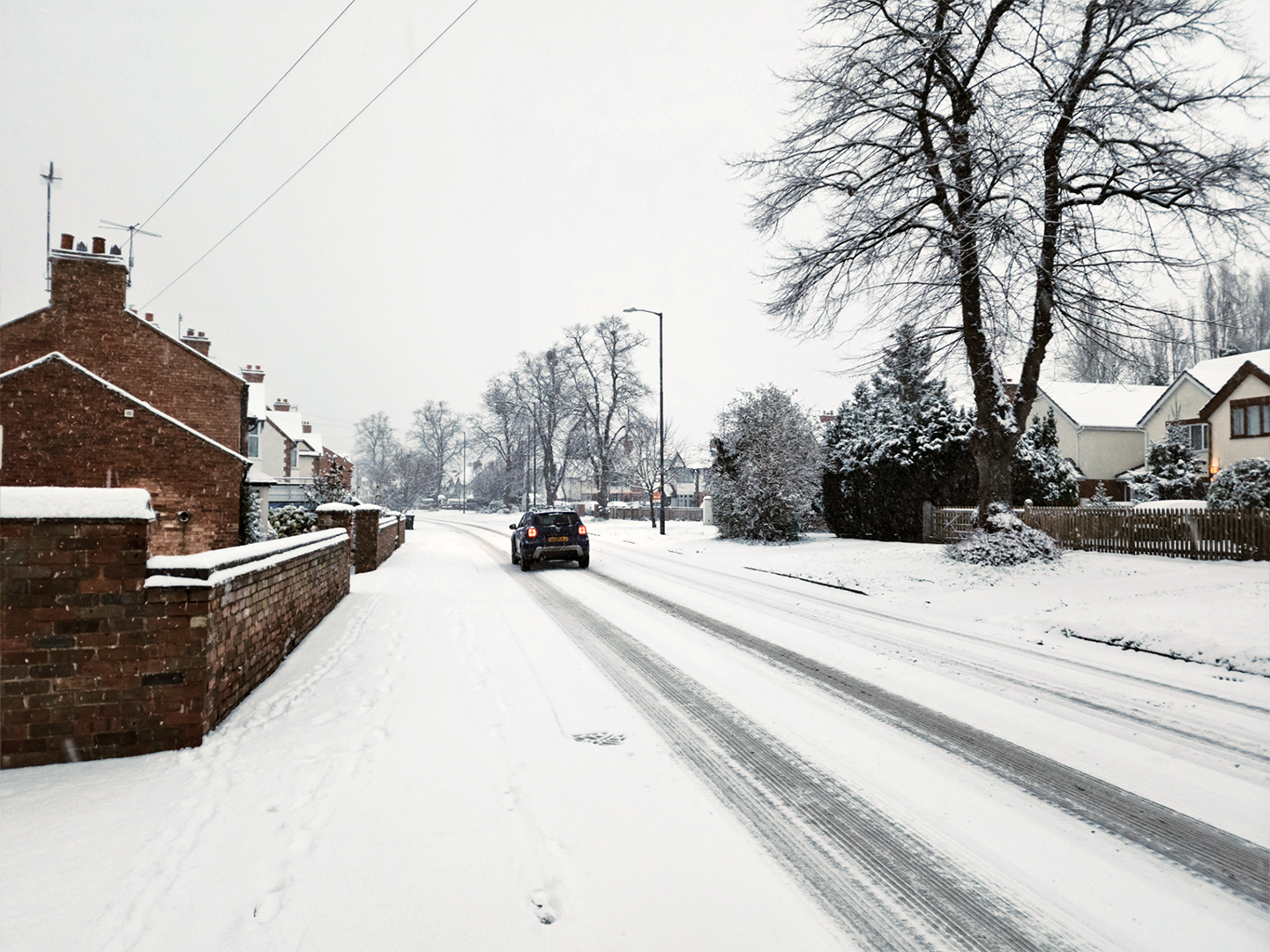
Snow in Warwickshire on 11 December 2022

On 5 December 2022, the UKHSA issued a level 3 cold weather alert for every region in England, suggesting a high probability of severe cold weather and icy conditions. By 8 December, temperatures plummeted across the country with the arrival of an arctic maritime air mass, and several ice warnings were issued by the Met Office. Snow fell across parts of Scotland, which led to travel disruption on the roads, particularly in Aberdeenshire. In the following days, snow also began to fall across other parts of the country, and temperatures plummeted even further. On 11 December, a snowfall event affected southern England and the Midlands, with accumulations exceeding 20 cm (8 in) in some areas. In London, there was widespread distruption caused by the snow, and several airports around the city were affected by flight delays and cancellations, including Heathrow and Gatwick. On 12 December, the country experienced its coldest day since December 2010, with Braemar in Aberdeenshire recording a minimum temperature of −9.3 °C (15.3 °F). The cold spell eventually came to an abrupt end by 18 December, which led to some water pipes bursting as a result of a 'freeze-thaw' event.

=== Ireland ===
Ireland was also affected by the cold wave, with the cold weather starting on December 8, 2022 and lasting until December 18, 2022. Unlike in the United Kingdom, no snow was recorded but temperatures averaged at 0-1°C, making it one of the coldest Decembers in the country since 2011. No incidents were recorded however.

== Incidents ==
On 11 December, four boys fell through ice which accumulated on the surface of Babbs Mill Lake in Solihull, resulting in their deaths. An inquest heard that they fell into the frozen lake after feeding ducks and skimming stones, and it was concluded that their deaths were accidental.
