= 2022 Bermondsey stabbing =

2022 mass stabbing in England

- Location of the stabbing within Greater London
- Location: 51.4873°N 0.0568°W; Bermondsey, London, Greater London, England
- Date: 25 April 2022
- Attack type: Mass stabbing
- Deaths: 4
- Injuries: 0
- Perpetrator: Joshua Jacques

On 25 April 2022, four people were stabbed to death in Bermondsey, London, United Kingdom.

In the early hours of 25 April at 01:42am, a neighbour called emergency services after hearing signs of a struggle from a three-bedroomed terraced house in Delaford Road, Bermondsey, in south London, England. Police arrived at 1:49 am, forced entry to the property and discovered the bodies of three women and a man inside the house. They were 64-year-old Jamaican woman Dolet Hill, her 58-year-old partner Denton Burke, as well as her 45-year-old daughter Tanysha Ofori-Akuffo, and 27-year-old granddaughter Samantha Drummonds.

Armed police officers tasered and arrested 28 year old Joshua Jacques (born 19 April 1994) who was found inside the home's bathroom. Jacques was the partner of Samantha Drummonds and had spent the evening with the family. On 28 April, Joshua Jacques was charged with four counts of murder. At trial, he admitted to the killings and pleaded guilty to manslaughter on the grounds of diminished responsibility due to drug-induced psychosis; however, on 22 December 2023, a jury at the Central Criminal Court (Old Bailey) rejected the defense and found him guilty on four counts of murder.

On 1 March 2024, Jacques was sentenced to life in prison, with a minimum term of 46 years. Mr Justice Bryan described the attack as a "horrific catalogue of murders", and noted that Jacques voluntary intoxication using skunk cannabis played a part leading up to the murders. The Judge also noted that Jacques was aware that the drug usage was impacting his mental health and chose to ignore numerous warnings dating back as far as 2016.

On 7 March 2024, HM Inspectorate of Probation released a report detailing a series of failings in the handling of Jacques by the Probation Service, given that he was on probation following a 51-month drugs-related custodial sentence at the time of the murders.
