= Murder of Zara Aleena =

2022 crime in East London, United Kingdom

On 26 June 2022, Zara Aleena was sexually assaulted and murdered as she was walking home in Ilford, East London, by Jordan McSweeney. The murder attracted attention after it was discovered McSweeney had committed numerous other offences and should have been recalled to prison.

== Murder ==
Aleena had begun working at the Royal Courts of Justice five weeks before her death.

Around 02:00 on 26 June 2022, Aleena left a bar on High Road close to Ilford railway station and began walking up Cranbrook Road towards Valentines Park. At the same time, McSweeney had been thrown out of a bar for harassing staff and had subsequently approached several other women. At 02:17, Aleena was violently attacked by McSweeney, after he had followed two other women, on Cranbrook Road. She was discovered collapsed on a driveway, struggling to breathe, given CPR, and was taken to the Royal London Hospital where she died of her injuries.

== Aftermath ==
The murder occurred nine days after McSweeney was released from prison on licence, having been jailed for robbery. A subsequent report in The Guardian said an attempt was made to recall him to prison two days before the murder, and suggested he should not have been released in the first place. The Metropolitan Police conducted an internal review after reports were published that McSweeney had been convicted 28 times for 69 earlier offences, including nine separate spells in prison, and ought to have been recalled. McSweeney had also had a history of violence and abuse, and a restraining order was taken out against him in 2021. Concern had been raised on 22 June, four days before the murder, after McSweeney failed to show for two appointments. Two days later, the Metropolitan Police attempted to arrest him, but he was not at the address on their records.

The Chief Inspector of Probation said the failure to assess McSweeney was caused by a lack of probation officers. London was highlighted as particularly problematic, with around half of posts remaining to be filled in some London boroughs.

On 18 November 2022, in court at the Old Bailey, McSweeney admitted the murder and sexual assault of Zara Aleena via videolink and pleaded guilty to the charges made against him. On 14 December 2022, the judge Mrs Justice Cheema-Grubb sentenced McSweeney to life imprisonment with a minimum prison term of 38 years. McSweeney was also given a four-year term for sexual assault, a sentence that will run concurrently with that served for murder. At sentencing, the judge said she did not believe McSweeney's actions on the night of the killing were an "aberration"; and described McSweeney as "a pugnacious and deeply violent man with a propensity to violence". During the hearing and at sentencing, McSweeney refused to leave prison to appear before the court; with his defending barrister, George Carter-Stephenson KC, saying his client "did not want to relive the incident" knowing that CCTV footage would be played at the hearing. In response to McSweeney's refusal to attend, the judge described McSweeney as having "no spine whatsoever".

In January 2023, the then Prime Minister, Rishi Sunak said the murder was a "terrible crime", and announced the government would take urgent action to review how McSweeney was incorrectly assessed for medium risk.

== Appeal ==
In October 2023, McSweeney appealed for a reduction in his prison term. The original sentence meant he would not become eligible to be considered for parole until 7 August 2059. At the appeal, McSweeney's barrister Carter-Stephenson KC, said the sentencing judge had misevaluated the "aggravating features" in the case, arguing that although there was an accepted sexual motive to the crime, the murder itself was not premeditated, telling the court "the attack was an opportunistic act rather than anything that was planned in advance." His barrister also argued that McSweeney's ADHD should have been taken into account when he was sentenced in December 2022. On 3 November 2023, three court judges at the court of appeal in London ruled that the sentencing judge had imposed too high an “uplift” to the minimum term, reducing the sentence by five years to a minimum term of 33 years. The revised sentence set a new parole eligibility date of 25 October 2053.
