= Murder of Yasmin Chkaifi =

2022 stabbing in London

- Location: Paddington, London, England
- Date: 24 January 2022; 4 years ago 9:00 am
- Victims: Yasmin Chkaifi, aged 43
- Perpetrator: Leon McCaskie

On 24 January 2022, Yasmin Chkaifi was stabbed to death in London, United Kingdom. Her killer, Leon McCaskie, was killed by a passer-by minutes later.

== Background ==
Yasmin Wafah Chkaifi (Arabic: ياسمين الشقايفي, romanized: Yāsmīn ash-Shkayfī; 1978 – 24 January 2022) was a 43-year-old British Moroccan woman who had two teenage sons, aged 16 and 18, and lived in Maida Vale, West London, England. She was working as a childminder whilst studying a masters degree as a mature student.

== Chkaifi's death ==
At about 9 AM on 24 January 2022, Chkaifi was stabbed to death on Chippenham Road, Maida Vale, nearby to her home and in front of onlookers and nearby to a school. Within minutes, her killer, Leon McCaskie, was himself killed when a 26-year-old stranger who had witnessed the attack as he waited in traffic on his way to work drove his Renault Clio into the assailant. Both Chkaifi and McCaskie were declared deceased at the scene, with Chkaifi's death due to "multiple stab wounds."

McCaskie, who was 41, was Chkaifi's former long-term partner. Her son told the media that McCaskie had been stalking his mother, there had been allegations of her suffering from domestic abuse, and she had told a friend "I think he will kill me." A warrant for McCaskie's arrest had been issued on 4 January after he failed to appear for his first hearing at Westminster Magistrates' Court after breaching a stalking prevention order that been put in place against him. The warrant was not executed by the officer in the case.

== Aftermath ==
The police arrested the driver on suspicion of murder and bailed him until late February. However, by 1 February the Metropolitan Police decided that the unnamed 26-year-old would face no further action, following a review of the evidence, including CCTV footage of the incident.

Sections of the media referred to the driver as a "hero" for driving his car into the knifeman upon seeing the attack. Over 53,000 people signed a petition on Change.org, supporting him for his actions. He was supported by Chkaifi's sister, who told journalists that "the man who killed my sister is a demon. The man who killed him is a hero. He deserves a medal from the Queen. There is no way he should go through the justice system for what he did."

At time of her death, Chkaifi was married to Joseph Salmon. He said that "not enough was done to protect her" by the Police, that he was "at a loss" and was "heartbroken".

An independent investigation was later conducted by the Independent Office for Police Conduct, after Scotland Yard referred itself to the Office. In 2023, the investigation found that the there had been failings, but that these were "not sufficiently serious to justify misconduct proceedings." Chkaifi's cousin challenged this decision, following which an order by the High Court, dated 10 November 2023: "ordered that a new decision should be made by a fresh decision maker with no involvement in the previous decision."

In 2024, a major review found that "victims of stalking are not being protected enough by police forces in England and Wales." Chkaifi's cousins said after the report that "police forces needed to realise just how dangerous stalking can be."
