= Dover firebomb attack =

2022 terrorist attack on Border Force centre in Dover, England

- Location: 51.11540°N 1.31198°E; Dover, Kent, England
- Date: 30 October 2022; 11:20 (GMT)
- Attack type: Arson, bombing, terrorist attack
- Weapon: Petrol bomb
- Deaths: 1 (the perpetrator)
- Injuries: 2
- Motive: Far-right extremism

On 30 October 2022, a petrol bomb attack was perpetrated against a Border Force centre for processing migrants in Dover, England. Two people suffered minor injuries.

The suspect – a 66-year-old man from High Wycombe in Buckinghamshire – killed himself after the attack.

== Attack ==
Around 11:20 GMT on 30 October 2022, a man drove a white Seat Tarraco to the Border Force centre in Dover, England, and threw two or three petrol bombs at the complex. One of the bombs failed to ignite. A witness stated that the attacker then drove to a petrol station and tied a noose around his neck and attached it to a metal pole before driving off, killing himself.

== Investigation ==
Kent Police said that two or three devices had been thrown into a Home Office establishment and that investigations were ongoing. They were unable to confirm that the attacker had killed himself.

An army bomb disposal unit was sent to the site of the attack and to the petrol station on Limekiln Street to examine a suspect vehicle, where another device was found and later made safe by the Explosive Ordnance Disposal Unit.

Police said it was likely a hate attack, driven by a right-wing ideology, and was being investigated by counter-terrorism police.

=== Suspect ===
The suspect was Andrew Leak, a 66-year-old man from High Wycombe in Buckinghamshire. A property in High Wycombe was searched by Thames Valley Police the day after the attack.

Leak had posted rants on Facebook against Muslims, asylum seekers, China, and COVID-19. Counter-terrorism teams were brought in to investigate him.

On 5 November 2022 Counter Terrorism Police South East announced that it had evidence the attack was "motivated by a terrorist ideology" and that the perpetrator had "extreme right-wing motivation".

=== Motive ===
Counter Terrorism Policing senior national coordinator Tim Jaques said that while there were "strong indications that mental health was likely a factor" he concluded that the "suspect’s actions were primarily driven by an extremist ideology" and these met the "threshold for a terrorist incident".

The suspect was unknown to counter terrorist police and there were no indications he had worked with anyone else.
