= Premiership of Liz Truss =

Period of the Government of the United Kingdom in 2022

- Official portrait, 2022
- Premiership of Liz Truss; 6 September 2022 – 25 October 2022
- Monarchs: Elizabeth II; Charles III
- Cabinet: Truss ministry
- Party: Conservative
- Seat: 10 Downing Street
- Coat of arms of HM Government

Liz Truss's tenure as Prime Minister of the United Kingdom began on 6 September 2022 when she accepted an invitation from Queen Elizabeth II to form a government, succeeding Boris Johnson, and ended 49 days later on 25 October upon her resignation. As prime minister, she served simultaneously as First Lord of the Treasury, Minister for the Civil Service, Minister for the Union, and Leader of the Conservative Party.

Truss defeated Rishi Sunak in the July–September 2022 Conservative Party leadership election on 5 September and was appointed prime minister the following day. Elizabeth II's death on 8 September caused government business to be suspended during a national mourning period of 10 days. In response to the cost-of-living crisis and energy supply crisis, the Truss ministry announced the Energy Price Guarantee, which reduced energy prices for households, businesses, and public sector organisations. Kwasi Kwarteng, then Chancellor of the Exchequer, announced large-scale borrowing and tax cuts in a mini-budget on 23 September. The mini-budget was widely criticised and largely reversed, having led to financial instability.

Truss dismissed Kwarteng without explanation on 14 October and appointed Jeremy Hunt to succeed him. Suella Braverman resigned as Home Secretary on 19 October after admitting to having used her personal email address to send a Cabinet document. Her resignation letter was critical of Truss's government. On the evening of 19 October, MPs voted to reject a motion which would guarantee parliamentary time for a bill to ban fracking in the UK. The vote was controversial as it was unclear whether a three-line-whip had been issued to Conservative MPs, ordering them to vote against it. Allegations of "manhandling" and intimidation were made by a number of MPs against some government ministers. Following these events, together with mounting criticism and loss of confidence in her leadership, Truss announced on 20 October her intention to resign as party leader and as prime minister. Sunak was elected unopposed as her successor and succeeded her as leader on 24 October and as prime minister on 25 October.

== Conservative leadership bid ==
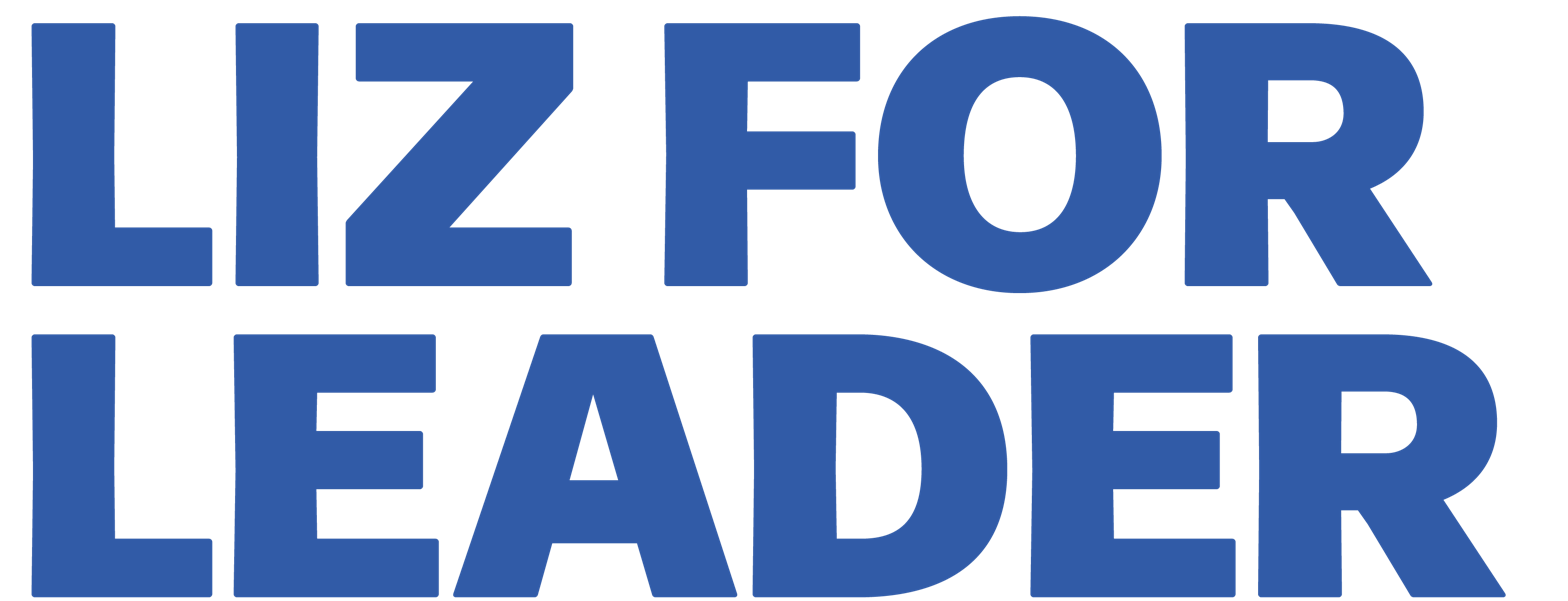
Campaign logo

Liz Truss launched her bid to succeed Boris Johnson on 10 July 2022. During the July–September 2022 Conservative Party leadership election, she pledged to cut taxes by scrapping the National Insurance rise that had previously been announced in April 2022, scrapping the recent corporation tax rise and also promised to remove green energy levies. During the campaign, when asked whether French president Emmanuel Macron was a friend or foe, Truss replied that the "jury was out" and that she would judge Macron based on his "deeds not words". During a hustings event, Truss suggested that it would be best to ignore the "attention seeker" Scottish First Minister Nicola Sturgeon before rejecting the possibility of a second independence referendum for Scotland.

Truss finished second in the fifth round of voting amongst the Conservative Parliamentary Party on 20 July 2022 with 113 votes behind Rishi Sunak with 137 votes, qualifying her for the final vote amongst the membership. She defeated Rishi Sunak in the members' vote with 57.4 per cent of the vote against Sunak's 42.6 per cent. She became the fourth consecutive Conservative Party prime minister since 2010, and the third female prime minister, following Margaret Thatcher and Theresa May. Following the announcement there were protests in London.

== Premiership ==
=== First speech and initial appointments ===
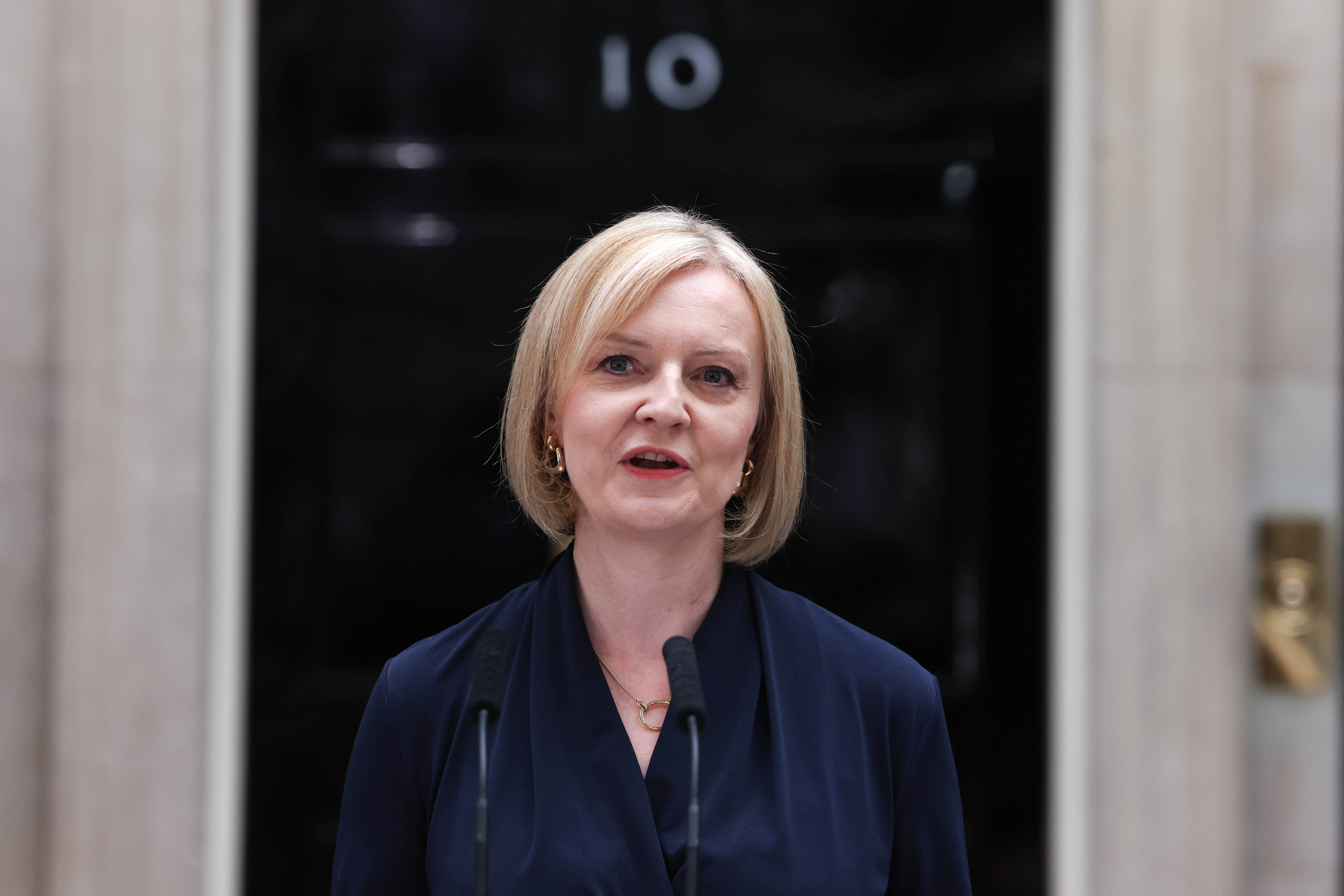
Truss giving her first speech as prime minister, 6 September 2022

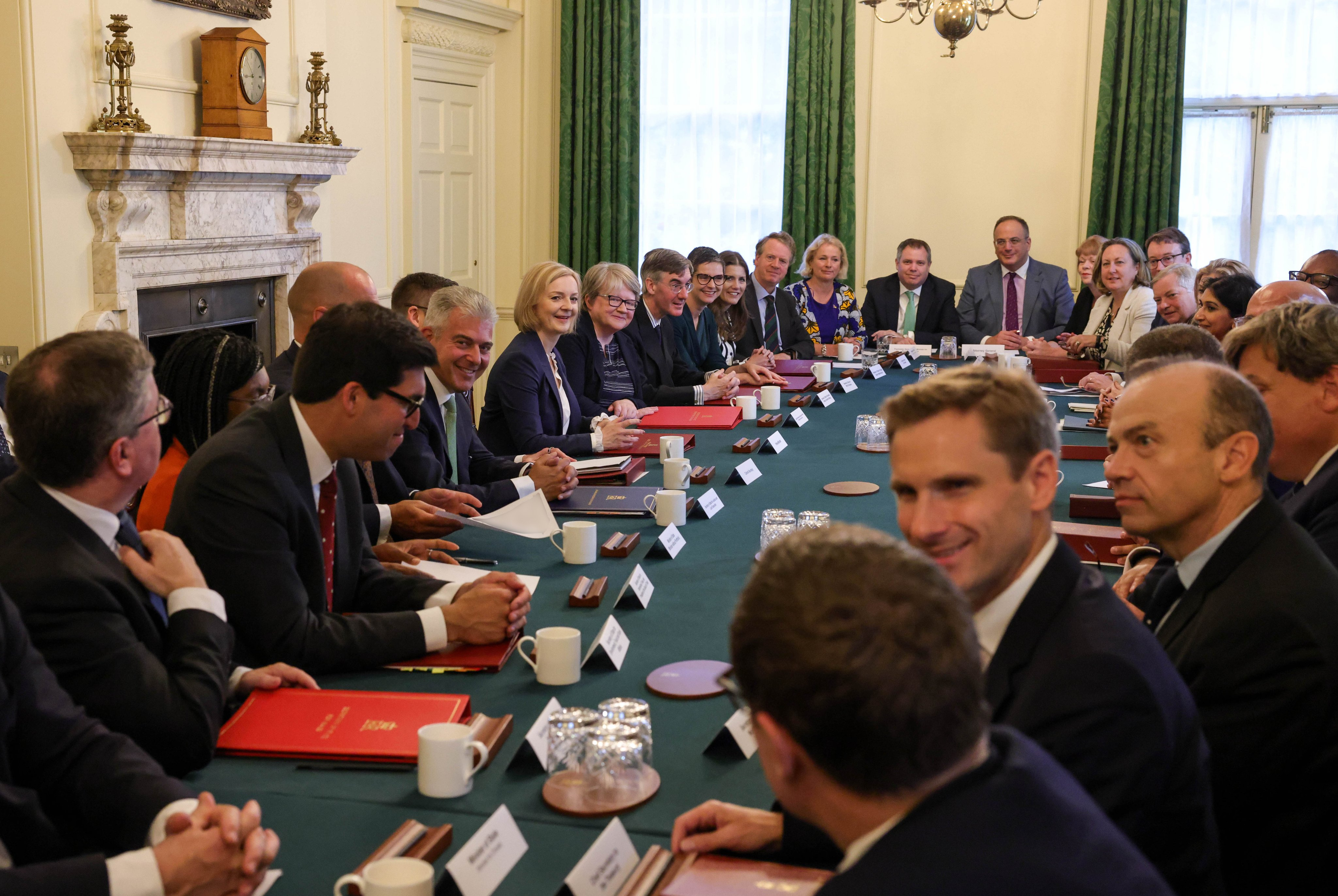
Truss chairing the first meeting of her cabinet

Truss made her first speech as prime minister in Downing Street on 6 September. In the speech she thanked and praised Johnson, and focused on economic growth, similar to during her campaign. Truss also stated the need for an energy plan as well other foreign policy statements. Loud music was played outside Downing Street by protesters as Truss spoke.

With the appointment of Kwasi Kwarteng as Chancellor of the Exchequer, James Cleverly as Foreign Secretary, and Suella Braverman as Home Secretary, for the first time in British political history, no white men held positions in the Great Offices of State.

Other key appointments included that of Thérèse Coffey as Deputy Prime Minister and Health Secretary, Brandon Lewis as Justice Secretary, Nadhim Zahawi as Chancellor of the Duchy of Lancaster, Chris Heaton-Harris as Northern Ireland Secretary, Jake Berry as Minister without Portfolio and Party chairman, Jacob Rees-Mogg as Business Secretary, Simon Clarke as Housing Secretary, Kemi Badenoch as Secretary of State for International Trade, Chloe Smith as Work and Pensions Secretary, Kit Malthouse as Education Secretary, Ranil Jayawardena as Environment Secretary, Anne-Marie Trevelyan as Transport Secretary, and Michael Ellis as Attorney General for England and Wales. Truss retained Ben Wallace as Defence Secretary, Alok Sharma as President for COP26, Alister Jack as Scotland Secretary, Robert Buckland as Wales Secretary, and James Heappey as Minister of State for the Armed Forces and Veterans (Note: Heappey, who previously served as Minister of State for the Armed Forces, was given the additional portfolio of Veterans' Minister and was given the right to attend Cabinet.)

In September 2022, Truss's chief of staff Mark Fullbrook was revealed to have been questioned by the FBI regarding an election bribe in Puerto Rico. Dominic Johnson was given a life peerage to enable him to be appointed as an investment minister. Johnson was a Conservative Party donor and gave the Conservatives over £300,000, and former business partner of Jacob Rees-Mogg.

=== Death of Queen Elizabeth II ===
Truss was the fifteenth and final prime minister to serve under Queen Elizabeth II, who died two days after appointing her. Her death at the age of 96 was announced by Buckingham Palace on 8 September at 6.30 pm. Truss delivered a statement outside 10 Downing Street paying tribute to the Queen, stating that "Queen Elizabeth II was the rock on which modern Britain was built." A video from 1994 emerged around this time of Truss branding the monarchy "disgraceful" and advocating for a republic. Truss was then the president of the Oxford University Liberal Democrats.

The House of Commons began two days of special tributes to the Queen on 9 September and started the suspension of Parliament until 21 September during the national mourning period. Truss attended the Accession Ceremony of Charles III the following day and took an oath of allegiance to the king alongside other senior MPs. On 12 September, King Charles III addressed Parliament for the first time as monarch. She also attended the state funeral of Elizabeth II at Westminster Abbey on 19 September, where she read a lesson during the service.

=== Cost-of-living crisis and energy policies ===
In response to the cost-of-living crisis, Truss set out plans to launch the Energy Price Guarantee, a scheme to freeze energy bills at an average of £2,500 a year for two years to support homes and businesses through the crisis. Truss stated that the government would fund the scheme by reducing the unit cost of energy through increased borrowing. The initiative was forecast to cost approximately £150 billion in taxpayer funds to energy suppliers to make up the difference between what they pay for power in the wholesale markets, and the capped consumer prices. Additionally, it was announced that green levies worth on average £150 per year would be removed temporarily. To fund the scheme, the Labour Party had proposed a windfall tax on excess profits of energy companies; however, Truss rejected these proposals claiming that it would deter investment. Truss claimed that her proposals would save each household £1,000 a year on average.

As part of Truss's cost-of-living proposals, energy resilience was also highlighted as a priority including plans to lift the moratorium on fracking for shale gas in the near future and launching a new round of approximately 100 new oil and gas licences. Equally, Truss planned to accelerate new sources of energy supply including nuclear, wind and solar energy. Many northern Conservative MPs opposed ending the moratorium on fracking. Mark Menzies led this group and Menzies insisted that fracking had no local support.

=== Industrial relations ===
Throughout the summer and autumn of 2022, several railway strikes took place, after a ballot of National Union of Rail, Maritime and Transport Workers (RMT) members over whether they should take industrial action. The dispute between the government and rail companies were concerning pay, redundancies and changes to terms and conditions. The RMT suggested that salaries should increase due to the ongoing cost-of-living crisis. Furthermore, the RMT highlighted the issue of redundancies with Network Rail planning on cutting 2,500 jobs within the next two years. In the same period, criminal barristers had begun striking during her predecessor's premiership. On 10 October 2022, barristers voted to end the strike after reaching a deal with Truss's Secretary of State for Justice, Brandon Lewis.

=== Trussonomics and the September 2022 mini-budget ===
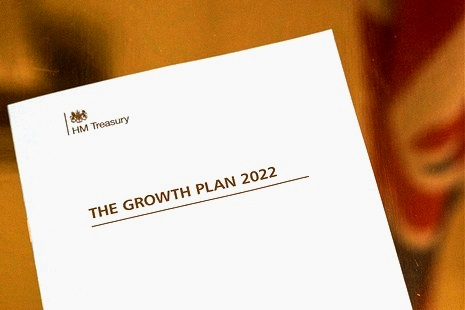
The September 2022 United Kingdom mini-budget

==== Advocation for Trussonomics by the Free Enterprise Group ====
Truss's economic policies, called "Trussonomics", were advocated by the Free Enterprise Group, a group of Thatcherite-leaning Conservative Party MPs founded by Truss in mid-2011. The policies are based upon the principle of reducing the overall tax burden, as part of a model intended to create a high-growth, free-market economy.

==== Proposals of the mini-budget and snubbing the Office for Budget Responsibility (OBR) ====
The policies of Trussonomics involve extensive tax cuts in addition to reducing government regulation and repealing employment laws to attract businesses, encourage entrepreneurship, and grow the economy. Proponents of Trussonomics argue that lower taxes would pay for themselves by encouraging economic growth, a theory known as supply-side economics. The tax cuts proposed in the Truss–Kwarteng mini-budget were therefore to be funded by borrowing. The proponents' expectations were that, kick-started by a temporary scheme of lending, tax revenue would eventually increase due to growth in the economy, relieving the need for amassing debt from the tax-cutting measures. Trussonomics was influenced by the economic policies of Ronald Reagan, known as Reaganomics, and of Nigel Lawson, the second Chancellor of the Exchequer under Margaret Thatcher. Matthew Sinclair was her chief economist.

In response to a stagnant economy, a mini-budget was announced in September 2022 with "growth" as its key ambition. It led to a run on sterling, a fall in gilt markets, lost confidence among global investors and criticism from the International Monetary Fund (IMF). It included measures in several sectors such as taxation, benefits, work and investment, stamp duty, energy, bankers' bonuses, shopping, infrastructure and investment zones. The package which was announced by Chancellor of the Exchequer Kwasi Kwarteng relied heavily on government borrowing. Goldman Sachs, Bank of America and the IMF among others were sceptical that £45 billion unfunded tax cuts could lead to economic growth and pay for itself as the government hoped. Within the budget, Kwarteng removed the 45 per cent rate of income tax paid by those earning more than £150,000 a year, reversed the rise in national insurance contributions and brought forward by a year the reduction in the basic rate of income tax from 20 per cent to 19 per cent planned for 2024 whilst also scrapping the cap on bankers' bonuses.

Major mini-budget measures by cost over 5 years
	£ billions
National Insurance increase reversal	77
Corporation Tax cancel increase	63
Energy bills support 2022–23	60^{[a]}
Cost-of-living support	15
Stamp Duty reduction	7
Income Tax remove 45% rate band	7
IR35 easing	6
^{a} Domestic energy support runs to Sep 2024, but only first 6 months is costed

As part of the mini-budget, Kwarteng announced a cut on stamp duty. Buyers in England and Northern Ireland would pay no stamp duty on the first £250,000 of a property's value, with the previous threshold being £125,000. For first-time buyers, no tax would be paid on the first £425,000. However, experts said that the cut in stamp duty was unlikely to help first-time homebuyers to get on the property ladder and risked pushing up house prices further. Kwarteng refused to allow the Office for Budget Responsibility (OBR) to assess the economic impact of the mini budget prior to its announcement. Conservative MP Mel Stride, a member of the Treasury Select Committee, wanted independent forecasts published to "provide reassurance and confidence to international markets and investors".

==== Response of financial markets and organisations ====
Following the mini-budget announcement, the markets reacted badly with the sterling and government bonds dropping significantly in response to a large increase in government borrowing. By 23 September, the pound had hit a 37-year low against the US dollar at below $1.10 whilst the FTSE 100 Index fell by 2.3 per cent. Andrew Wishart, at Capital Economics, said the market reaction to Kwarteng's budget suggested mortgage rates of more than 6 per cent were now a "distinct possibility".

==== Criticism from political opponents and International Monetary fund (IMF) warnings as public approval ratings plummet ====
The Labour Party accused the Conservatives of gambling on the economy. On 27 September, the IMF also warned the UK government that it should re-evaluate the planned tax cuts announced in the mini-budget as they would heighten inequality and inflation in the country. Additionally, there was a strong public reaction with one YouGov poll on 29 September recording a 33-point lead for the Labour Party ahead of the Conservatives. Truss's personal approval rating were reported as minus 37, falling from minus 7 in one week, with 12 per cent of people describing the mini-budget as a good policy.

==== Government response to market volatility and sacking of Kwasi Kwarteng ====
In response, Truss and Kwarteng reversed the decision on the removal of the 45 pence of income tax for higher earners on 3 October following a significant backlash. Kwarteng was dismissed by Truss on 14 October 2022, who appointed Jeremy Hunt to succeed him. Later that day, Truss held a press conference which lasted for eight minutes with Truss announcing that the previously planned corporation tax rise that she had campaigned to abandon during the leadership campaign would now go ahead. Truss said she decided on these changes because the mini-budget "went further and faster than markets were expecting".

==== Further criticism from opposition MPs, devolved governments, International Monetary Fund (IMF), US President and press ====
The implementation of Trussonomics was heavily criticised by members of opposing political parties, with members of the Labour Party describing the policies as "casino economics" and suggesting it would be of greater benefit to the wealthy than those on moderate incomes. The Scottish first minister Nicola Sturgeon and the Welsh finance minister Rebecca Evans both made statements in opposition to the tax cuts proposed under the September 2022 mini-budget, with some Conservative Party MPs also stating it was wrong to cut taxes. The editorial board of The Guardian criticised Trussonomics for going against the desires of the British voters by lowering taxes, reducing public spending, and increasing interest rates at a time when many in the United Kingdom desired more government investment, the nationalisation of certain industries, and lower levels of inequality.

Internationally, Trussonomics was criticised for its handling of the British economy. The International Monetary Fund (IMF), which acts to stabilise the global economy and sound economic warnings, took the unusual step of issuing a statement in which it openly criticised Truss's economic policies, stating that "the nature of the UK measures will likely increase inequality", and urging Truss's government to "re-evaluate" its tax measures, "especially those that benefit high income earners". U.S. president Joe Biden stated that he believed implementing Trussonomics was a "mistake", saying he disagreed with "the idea of cutting taxes on the super-wealthy". Other world leaders and world media also criticised the mini-budget and Truss's economic policy.

In his first speech as prime minister, Rishi Sunak said of Truss: "She was not wrong to want to improve growth in this country; it is a noble aim. And I admired her restlessness to create change. But some mistakes were made. Not borne of ill will or bad intentions; quite the opposite, in fact. But mistakes nonetheless." Sunak had previously criticised Truss's economic policy plans during the July–September 2022 Conservative Party leadership election.

=== Calls for Truss's resignation ===
According to The Telegraph, as of 17 October, there were at least five Conservative MPs calling for Truss's resignation: Crispin Blunt, Andrew Bridgen, Angela Richardson, Charles Walker and Katie Wallis. In an interview with the BBC's Chris Mason that evening Truss said she was "sorry for the mistakes that have been made" but remained "committed to the vision". She also said she would lead the Conservatives into the next general election. Lord Frost, on 18 October, had also called for the prime minister to resign.

Truss had meetings with Sir Graham Brady, the chair of the 1922 Committee on 17 and 20 October. The former meeting was stated to have caused Truss to miss an urgent question on the afternoon of 17 October requested by opposition leader Keir Starmer and granted by House of Commons Speaker Sir Lindsay Hoyle—with Leader of the House Penny Mordaunt answering on Truss's behalf. Truss's absence drew criticism from a number of MPs, including Starmer, although Truss later made a brief appearance in the House.

British tabloid newspaper Daily Star released a livestream of an iceberg lettuce on 14 October after The Economist compared Truss's term to "the shelf-life of a lettuce".

=== Resignations and vote on fracking ===
I think it's a shambles and a disgrace ... I hope all those people that put Liz Truss into Number 10, I hope it was worth it ... because the damage they have done to our party is extraordinary.

— Charles Walker's remarks on the market fallout, subsequent government crisis and Conservative unpopularity.

Home Secretary Suella Braverman resigned on 19 October and was replaced by Grant Shapps. The resignation was triggered by Braverman admitting to having shared an official document through her private email account with a parliamentary colleague. In her resignation letter, Braverman expressed "concerns about the direction of the government" and added that she "had serious concerns about this government's commitment to honouring manifesto commitments".

The same day, Ed Miliband, a Labour Party MP, tabled an opposition day motion on the subject of fracking. Truss pledged as part of her leadership campaign to lift the moratorium on fracking, yet some Conservative MPs had expressed concern about the change as it went against their 2019 manifesto. The motion was a Programme Order, which, if carried, would have bound the House to consider and hold a vote on a Bill banning fracking, under the rules and timetable set in the Order itself. As the motion would have granted the opposition partial control of the business of the House of Commons on certain days, the party whips strictly informed Conservative MPs to vote against it (a three-line whip). They were also informed that the vote would be treated as a matter of confidence.

As the day progressed, 10 Downing Street became increasingly concerned about the potential size of the rebellion among Conservative MPs and informed the climate minister, Graham Stuart, that the vote would no longer be treated as a matter of confidence. Although he subsequently relayed this to the House of Commons, the whips' office was not made aware of the change, resulting in confusion and disarray among Conservative MPs.

Soon after, William Wragg became the sixth MP to publicly call on the prime minister to go. Several Conservative MPs did not vote against the fracking motion. Confusion followed after the Minister Graham Stuart told Parliament "obviously this is not a confidence vote". Amid reports of Conservative MPs physically jostling their colleagues to vote against the Labour motion, the Chief Whip Wendy Morton and deputy chief whip Craig Whittaker were both thought to have resigned. Later it was clarified that they had not, and remained in their posts. An MP described the vote as "chaos" with claims, denied by cabinet ministers, that Conservative whips had manhandled and bullied backbenchers into voting against. Labour MP Chris Bryant made claims on Sky News saying that he saw MPs "physically manhandled through the voting lobby" naming Deputy Prime Minister Thérèse Coffey along with Jacob Rees-Mogg as those he saw in the "group". Later that evening, the Speaker of the House Lindsay Hoyle announced that he had asked the Serjeant at Arms and other parliamentary officials to investigate the allegations made about the incident. The fracking motion was ultimately defeated by a vote of 326–230, with 324 Conservative MPs opposing it.

During Prime Minister's Questions on 19 October, opposition Labour Party leader Keir Starmer questioned why Truss had not resigned, to which she responded: "I am a fighter and not a quitter", a phrase first made famous by Peter Mandelson, a former Labour Party First Secretary of State.

=== Resignation and aftermath ===
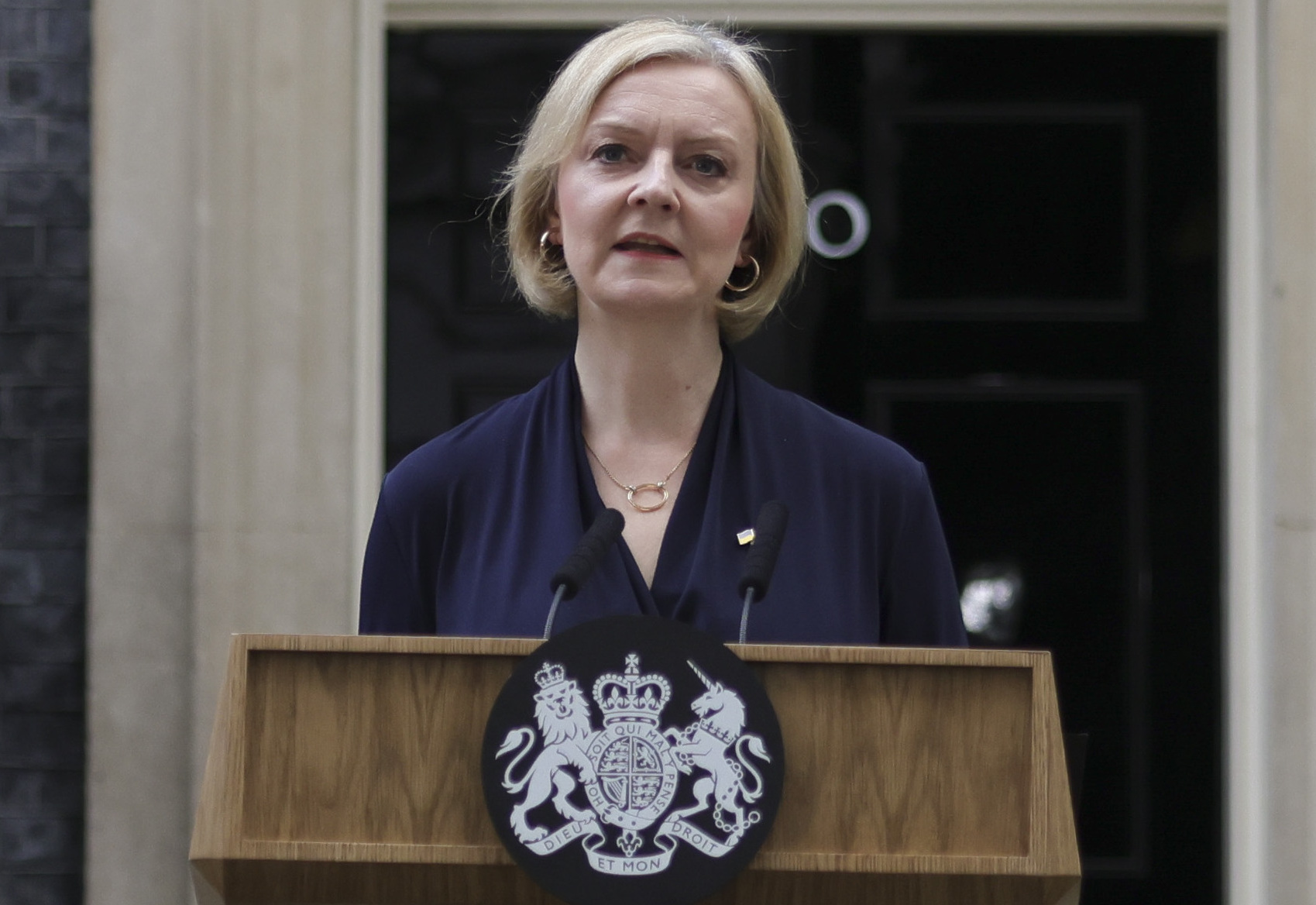
Truss announces her resignation outside 10 Downing Street on 20 October 2022; she left office on 25 October.

Truss announced her resignation as leader of the Conservative Party at 1:30 pm on 20 October 2022. In her speech, she stated that she could not "deliver the mandate on which I was elected by the Conservative Party". Truss confirmed that the subsequent leadership election would be held within the next week and that she would step down as prime minister when it concluded. Truss resigned as prime minister on 25 October on her 50th day in office thus making her the UK's shortest-serving prime minister.

In response to the resignation, Starmer and Sturgeon called for an immediate general election. Calls for an early election were also echoed by the Liberal Democrats and the Green Party. French president Emmanuel Macron said "it is important that Great Britain regains political stability very quickly, and that is all I wish." US president Joe Biden thanked Truss "for her partnership on a range of issues including holding Russia accountable for its war against Ukraine".

Sunak returned for the impending Conservative leadership campaign and was elected unopposed as Conservative Party leader and prime minister. Truss congratulated him and said that he had her "full support."

In February 2023, Truss wrote that she was not given a "realistic chance" to enact her policies, citing a "powerful economic establishment" and a lack of support from her own party.

Following her resignation, the future of Trussonomics is uncertain. Economic analysts have argued that despite the reversal of Truss's economic policies, Trussonomics will continue to have a lasting impact on the British economy, specifically with regard to market stability and credibility issues. Analysts have stated that a harder economic downturn marked by a 2 per cent contraction in GDP can be expected, with Truss's successor potentially having to implement austerity measures and spending cuts in an attempt to restore market credibility. In November 2022, just days before Jeremy Hunt's autumn statement, an independent think tank, Resolution Foundation, estimated that the Truss government was responsible for £30bn of the £60bn fiscal hole that needs to be tackled.

== Popularity ==
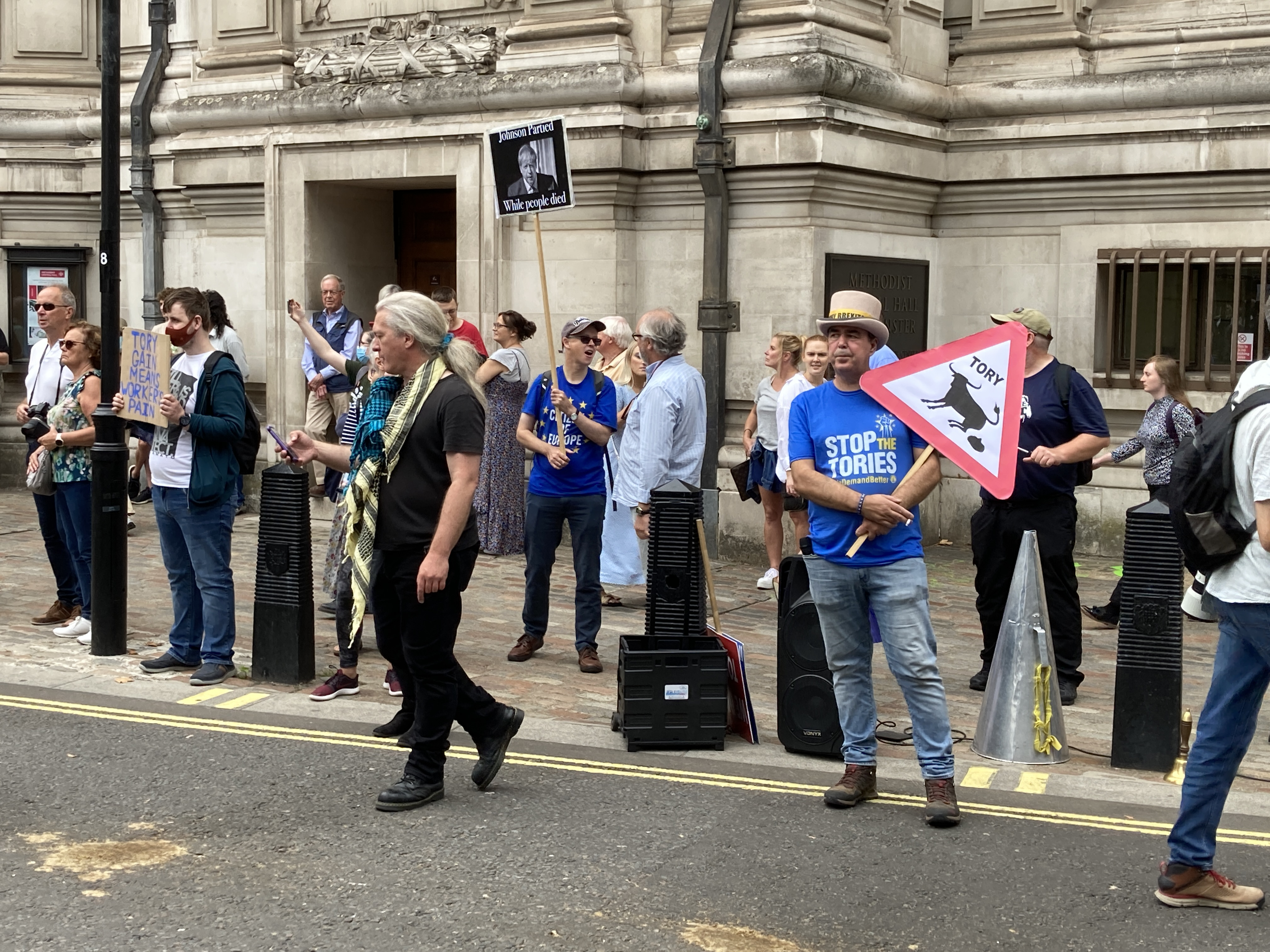
Protest against Truss and the Conservative Party on 5 September

Following the Conservative Party conference in October 2022, Truss had an approval rating of −47 per cent according to an opinion poll by The Observer. This was worse than Boris Johnson's rating during the Partygate scandal and Theresa May's rating before her resignation. 53 per cent of voters thought Truss should resign and 25 per cent wanted her to stay as Conservative leader.

An Opinium poll held between 26 and 30 September 2022 projected a Labour lead of 15 points, predicting the Conservatives to lose 219 seats in a general election including ten cabinet ministers.

As of mid-October 2022, bookmakers were taking odds for the date of Truss's resignation. Bookmakers placed Sunak first in their list of likely Conservative prime ministerial successors, followed in order by Hunt, Mordaunt, Wallace and Johnson.

A YouGov poll in October 2022 found that 77 per cent of Britons disapproved of the Conservative government, the highest recorded by YouGov in eleven years. Furthermore, they stated that 87 per cent of people believed that the government was handling the economy poorly. Their survey of Conservative Party members reported that a majority of them wanted Truss to resign, with their favoured front runners for her replacement being Boris Johnson as most popular, followed in order by Ben Wallace, Rishi Sunak, Penny Mordaunt, Kemi Badenoch, Jeremy Hunt, and Suella Braverman. Equally, a Redfield & Wilton poll registered a 36 per cent lead for the Labour Party (the largest lead by any party since October 1997) and recorded Truss's personal approval rating at 9 per cent.

== International prime ministerial trips ==
Truss made two international trips during her premiership:

	Country	Location(s)	Dates	Details	Image
1	United States	New York City	19–22 September	Truss attended the 77th United Nations General Assembly.	
2	Czech Republic	Prague	6 October	Truss attended the inaugural meeting of the European Political Community.	

== See also ==
- Foreign relations of the United Kingdom
- List of international trips made by James Cleverly as Foreign Secretary

== Explanatory notes ==
British premierships
Preceded by Johnson	Truss premiership September–October 2022	Succeeded by Sunak
