= October 2022 Conservative Party leadership election =

British leadership election to replace Liz Truss

- 24 October 2022
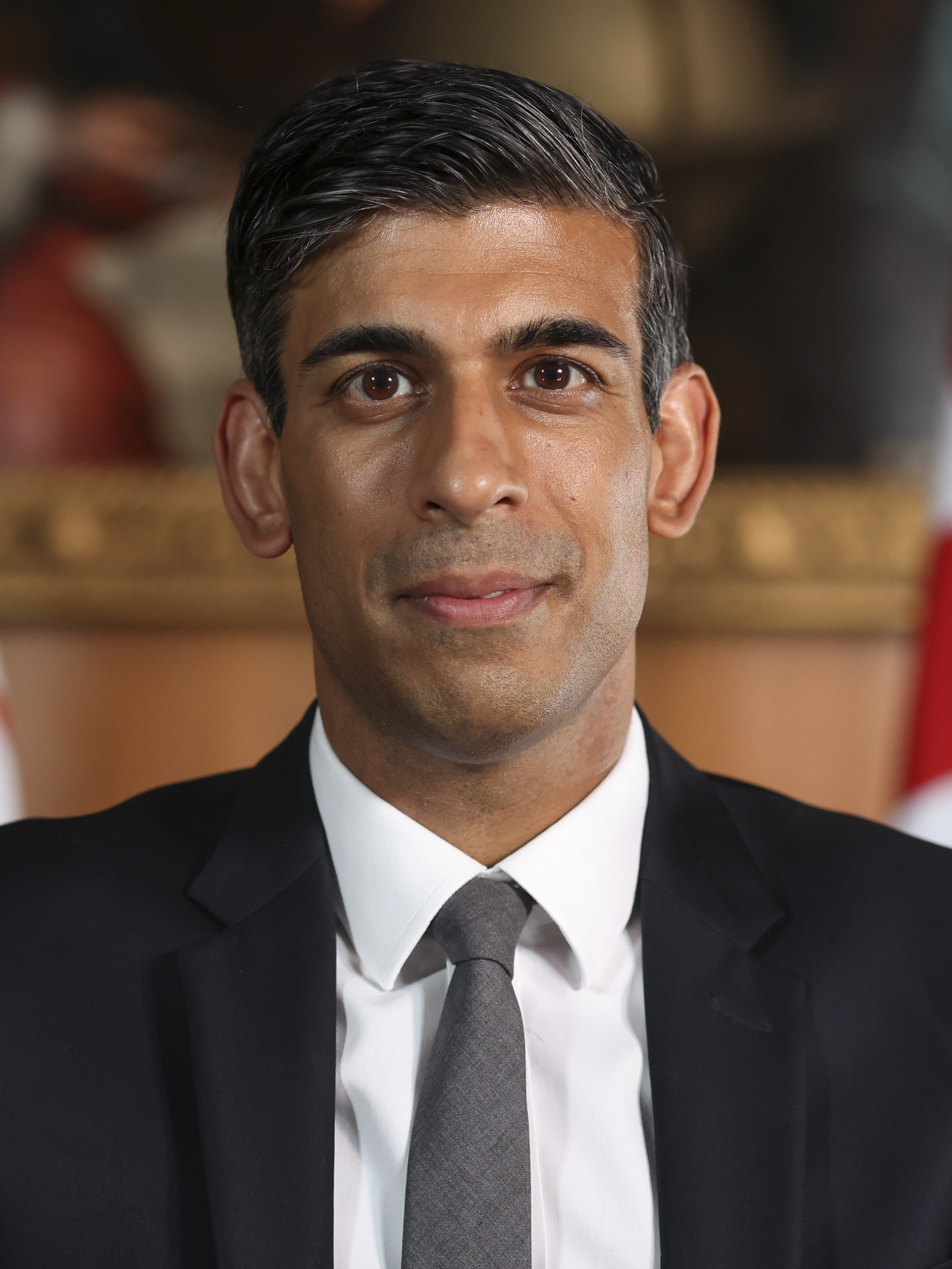
| Candidate | Rishi Sunak |
| Popular vote | Unopposed |
Leader before election
Liz Truss
Elected Leader
Rishi Sunak

The October 2022 Conservative Party leadership election was triggered by Liz Truss's announcement that she would resign as Leader of the Conservative Party and Prime Minister of the United Kingdom, amid an economic and political crisis.

In the July–September 2022 Conservative Party leadership election, Truss was elected to succeed Boris Johnson, who resigned after a string of controversies that severely damaged his personal reputation. Truss and her chancellor, Kwasi Kwarteng, announced large-scale tax cuts and borrowing in a mini-budget, which was widely criticised and largely reversed, having led to financial instability. Truss dismissed Kwarteng without explanation on 14 October and appointed Jeremy Hunt to succeed him. On the evening of 19 October, MPs voted to reject a motion which would guarantee parliamentary time for a bill to ban fracking in the UK. The vote was controversial as it was unclear whether a three-line-whip had been issued to Conservative MPs, ordering them to vote against it. Following these events, together with mounting criticism and loss of confidence in her leadership, Truss announced on 20 October her intention to resign as party leader and as prime minister, which made her the shortest-serving prime minister in British history.

Following a change of rules by the 1922 Committee, each potential leader needed the support of at least 100 MPs to be a candidate in the vote, with a deadline of 2 pm on 24 October to secure enough nominations. Two candidates put their names forward: Penny Mordaunt, Leader of the House of Commons and Lord President of the Council, and Rishi Sunak, former Chancellor of the Exchequer. Johnson was expected to enter the contest; it was stated he had exceeded the required number of MP backers but nevertheless decided not to stand. On 24 October, Mordaunt withdrew from the contest less than two minutes before the deadline for nominations, leaving Sunak the only candidate in the contest and enabling him to become party leader without a ballot of MPs or party members. He assumed the premiership on 25 October. In his victory speech, Sunak paid tribute to Truss and said that she "was not wrong" to want to implement growth and "admired her restlessness to create change", but admitted that "some mistakes were made" and promised to place economic stability and confidence at the heart of his government's agenda.

== Background ==
=== Boris Johnson premiership and scandals ===
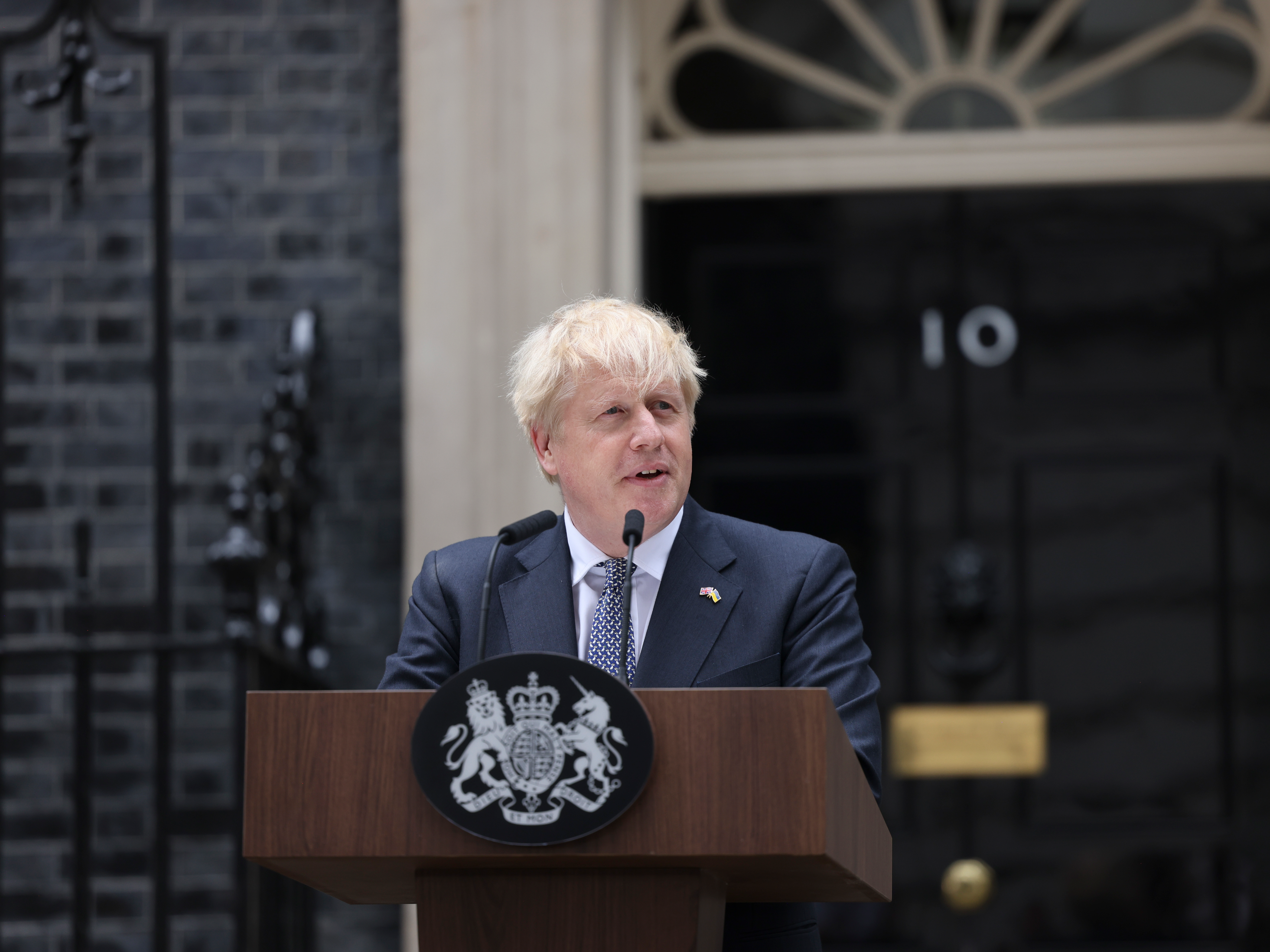
Boris Johnson announces his pending resignation outside 10 Downing Street on 7 July 2022; he left office on 6 September.

In the 2019 Conservative Party leadership election, Boris Johnson was elected to succeed Theresa May after she had been unable to secure a majority for her Brexit withdrawal agreement. After having lost his working majority to defections and his own suspensions of rebel Members of Parliament, Johnson called a general election on a platform of completing the UK's withdrawal from the European Union. In that general election, the Conservative Party won their biggest majority in Parliament since 1987, and Johnson was able to pass a revised version of May's withdrawal agreement.

Less than two months after the 2019 general election, cases of COVID-19 had reached the UK, and Johnson himself was hospitalised with the disease in March 2020. The government responded to the pandemic in March 2020 by enacting emergency powers and widespread societal measures including several lockdowns, and approved a vaccination programme which began in December 2020. Reception for Johnson's leadership during the COVID-19 pandemic was mixed. The media later reported that there had been social gatherings by the Conservative Party and government staff which contravened COVID-19 restrictions. Johnson was personally implicated, and he, his wife Carrie Johnson, and the Chancellor of the Exchequer Rishi Sunak, were given fixed penalty notices by the police in April 2022, becoming the first prime minister to be sanctioned for a criminal action while in office. Public dissatisfaction over the events led to a decline in public support for Johnson, the government led by him, and the Conservative Party as a whole.

The publishing of the Sue Gray report in May 2022 and a widespread sense of dissatisfaction led in June 2022 to a vote of confidence in his leadership among Conservative MPs, which he won. In late June 2022, the Conservative MP Chris Pincher resigned as deputy chief government whip after an allegation was made that he had sexually assaulted two men. Johnson initially refused to suspend the whip from him, and his spokesperson said Johnson had not been aware of "specific allegations" against Pincher. On 4 July, Johnson's spokesperson said that Johnson was aware of allegations that were "either resolved or did not proceed to a formal complaint" at the time he appointed him. Several ministers resigned on 5 July, including Sunak and health secretary Sajid Javid. Following dozens of government resignations, Johnson announced on 7 July his intention to resign.

=== Leadership election to succeed Johnson ===
Voting in the July–September 2022 Conservative Party leadership election took place between 13 July and 2 September. After a series of MP ballots, the list of candidates was narrowed down to Liz Truss, who served as Foreign Secretary and Minister for Women and Equalities under Johnson's leadership, and Rishi Sunak, who served as Chancellor of the Exchequer until 5 July. Truss launched her bid to succeed Boris Johnson on 10 July 2022. During the leadership election, Truss pledged to cut taxes by scrapping the National Insurance rise that had previously been announced in April 2022, scrapping the recent corporation tax rise and she also promised to remove green energy levies. During the campaign, when asked whether French President Emmanuel Macron was a friend or foe, Truss replied that the "jury was out" and that she would judge Macron based on his "deeds not words". During a hustings event, Truss suggested that it would be best to ignore the "attention seeker" Scottish First Minister Nicola Sturgeon before rejecting the possibility of a second independence referendum for Scotland.

Truss finished second in the fifth round of voting amongst the Conservative Parliamentary Party on 20 July 2022 with 113 votes behind Sunak with 137 votes, qualifying her for the final vote amongst the membership. She defeated Sunak in the members' vote with 57.4 per cent of the vote against Sunak's 42.6 per cent. She was elected on 5 September 2022, assuming office on 6 September 2022. She became the fourth consecutive Conservative Party prime minister since 2010, and the third female prime minister, following Margaret Thatcher and Theresa May. Following the announcement there were protests in London.

=== Liz Truss premiership and scandals ===
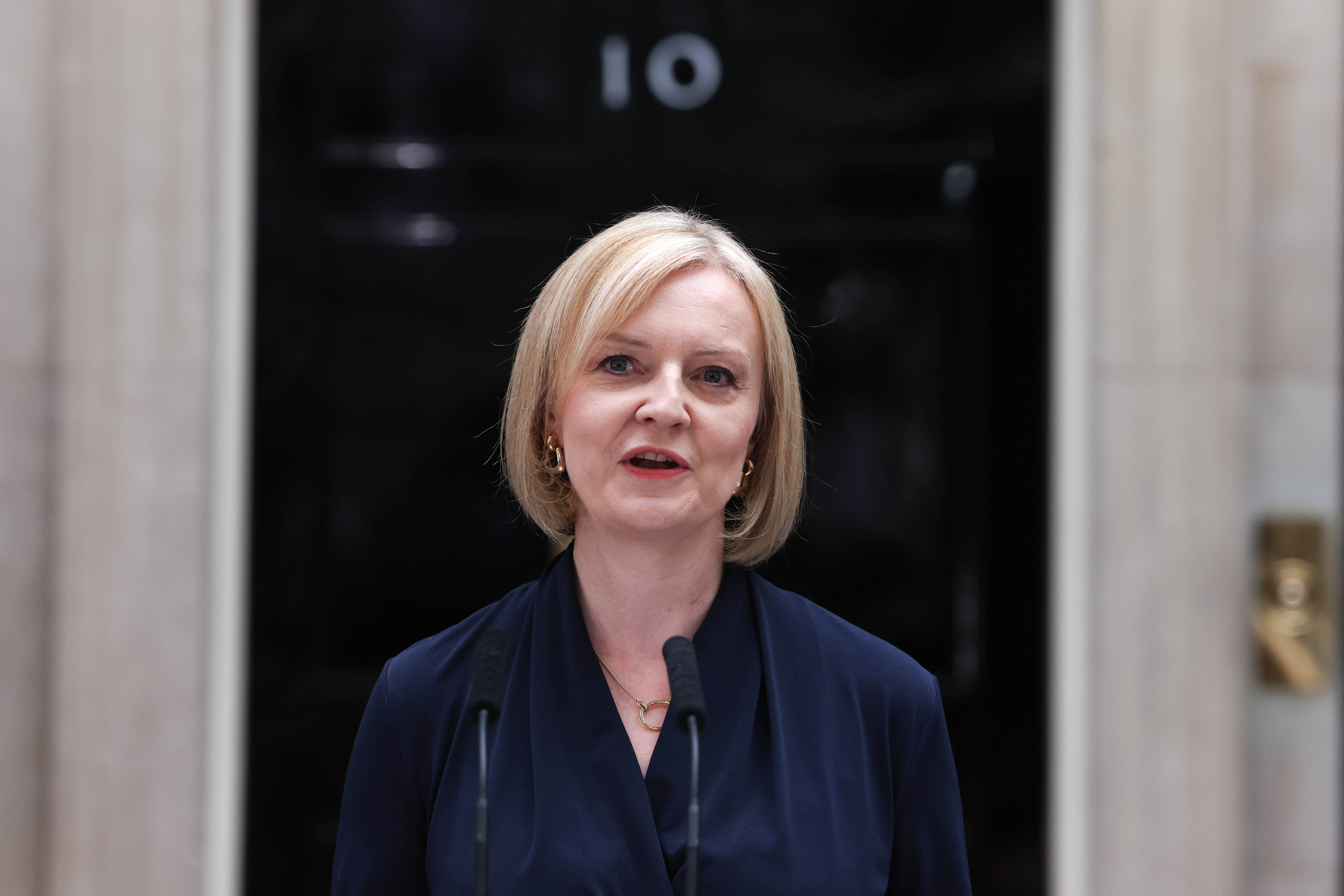
Truss giving her first speech as prime minister on 6 September.

On 5 September, Truss was elected to lead the party, and assumed the premiership on 6 September. Truss made her first speech as prime minister in Downing Street on 6 September. In the speech she thanked and praised Johnson, and focused on economic growth, similar to during her campaign. Truss also stated the need for an energy plan as well other foreign policy statements. Loud music was played outside Downing Street by protesters as Truss spoke.

Truss was the fifteenth and final prime minister to serve under Elizabeth II, who died two days after appointing Truss. Elizabeth II's death on 8 September caused government business to be suspended during a national mourning period of 10 days. In response to the cost-of-living crisis and energy supply crisis, the Truss ministry announced the Energy Price Guarantee, which reduced energy prices for households, businesses, and public sector organisations.

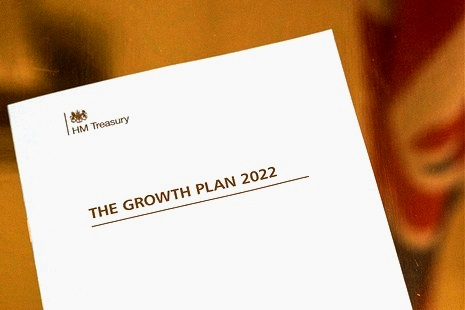
The September 2022 United Kingdom mini-budget

Truss's economic policies, called "Trussonomics", were advocated by the Free Enterprise Group, a group of Thatcherite-leaning Conservative Party MPs founded by Truss in mid-2011. The policies are based upon the principle of reducing the overall tax burden, as part of a model intended to create a high-growth, free-market economy.

The policies of Trussonomics involve extensive tax cuts in addition to reducing government regulation and repealing employment laws to attract businesses, encourage entrepreneurship, and grow the economy. Proponents of Trussonomics argue that lower taxes would pay for themselves by encouraging economic growth, a theory known as supply-side economics. The tax cuts proposed in the Truss–Kwarteng mini-budget were therefore to be funded by borrowing. The proponents' expectations were that, kick-started by a temporary scheme of lending, tax revenue would eventually increase due to growth in the economy, relieving the need for amassing debt from the tax-cutting measures. Trussonomics was influenced by the economic policies of Ronald Reagan, known as Reaganomics, and of Nigel Lawson, the second Chancellor of the Exchequer under Margaret Thatcher.

In response to a stagnant economy, a mini-budget was announced in September 2022 with "growth" as its key ambition. It led to a run on sterling, a fall in gilt markets, lost confidence among global investors and criticism from International Monetary Fund (IMF). It included measures in several sectors such as taxation, benefits, work and investment, stamp duty, energy, bankers' bonuses, shopping, infrastructure and investment zones. The package which was announced by Chancellor of the Exchequer Kwasi Kwarteng relied heavily on government borrowing. Goldman Sachs, Bank of America and the IMF among others were sceptical that £45 billion unfunded tax cuts could lead to economic growth and pay for itself as the government hoped. Within the budget, Kwarteng removed the 45 per cent rate of income tax paid by those earning more than £150,000 a year, reversed the rise in national insurance contributions and brought forward by a year the reduction in the basic rate of income tax from 20 per cent to 19 per cent planned for 2024 whilst also scrapping the cap on bankers' bonuses.

Major mini-budget measures by cost over 5 years
| | £ billions |
| National Insurance increase reversal | 77 |
| Corporation Tax cancel increase | 63 |
| Energy bills support 2022–23 | 60^{[a]} |
| Cost of living support | 15 |
| Stamp Duty reduction | 7 |
| Income Tax remove 45% rate band | 7 |
| IR35 easing | 6 |
^{a} Domestic energy support runs to Sep 2024, but only first 6 months is costed

As part of the mini-budget, Kwarteng announced a cut on stamp duty. Buyers in England and Northern Ireland would pay no stamp duty on the first £250,000 of a property's value, with the previous threshold being £125,000. For first-time buyers, no tax would be paid on the first £425,000. However, experts said that the cut in stamp duty was unlikely to help first-time homebuyers to get on the property ladder and risked pushing up house prices further. Kwarteng refused to allow the Office for Budget Responsibility (OBR) to assess the economic impact of the mini budget prior to its announcement. Conservative MP Mel Stride, a member of the Treasury Select Committee, wanted independent forecasts published to "provide reassurance and confidence to international markets and investors".

Following the mini-budget announcement, the markets reacted badly with the sterling and government bonds dropping significantly in response to a large increase in government borrowing. By 23 September, the pound had hit a 37-year low against the US dollar at below $1.10 whilst the FTSE 100 Index fell by 2.3 per cent. Andrew Wishart, at Capital Economics, said the market reaction to Kwarteng's budget suggested mortgage rates of more than 6 per cent were now a "distinct possibility". The Labour Party accused the Conservatives of gambling on the economy. On 27 September, the IMF also warned the UK government that it should re-evaluate the planned tax cuts announced in the mini-budget as they would heighten inequality and inflation in the country. Additionally, there was a strong public reaction with one YouGov poll on 29 September recording a 33-point lead for the Labour Party ahead of the Conservatives. Truss's personal approval rating were reported as minus 37, falling from minus 7 in one week, with 12 per cent of people describing the mini-budget as a good policy.

In response, Truss and Kwarteng reversed the decision on the removal of the 45 pence of income tax for higher earners on 3 October following a significant backlash. Kwarteng was dismissed by Truss on 14 October 2022, who appointed Jeremy Hunt to succeed him. Later that day, Truss held a press conference which lasted for eight minutes with Truss announcing that the previously planned corporation tax rise that she had campaigned to abandon during the leadership campaign would now go ahead. Truss said she decided on these changes because the mini-budget "went further and faster than markets were expecting".

The implementation of Trussonomics was heavily criticised by members of opposing political parties, with members of the Labour Party describing the policies as "casino economics" and suggesting it would be of greater benefit to the wealthy than those on moderate incomes. Scottish first minister Nicola Sturgeon and Welsh finance minister Rebecca Evans both made statements in opposition to the tax cuts proposed under the September 2022 mini-budget, with some Conservative Party MPs also stating it was wrong to cut taxes. The editorial board of The Guardian criticised Trussonomics for going against the desires of the British voters by lowering taxes, reducing public spending, and increasing interest rates at a time when many in the United Kingdom desired more government investment, the Nationalization of certain industries, and lower levels of inequality.

Internationally, Trussonomics was criticised for its handling of the British economy. The International Monetary Fund (IMF), which acts to stabilise the global economy and sound economic warnings, took the unusual step of issuing a statement in which it openly criticised Truss's economic policies, stating that "the nature of the UK measures will likely increase inequality", and urging Truss's government to "re-evaluate" its tax measures, "especially those that benefit high income earners". U.S. President Joe Biden stated that he believed implementing Trussonomics was a "mistake", saying he disagreed with "the idea of cutting taxes on the super-wealthy". Other world leaders and world media also criticised the mini-budget and Truss's economic policy.

In his first speech as prime minister, Rishi Sunak said of Truss: "She was not wrong to want to improve growth in this country; it is a noble aim. And I admired her restlessness to create change. But some mistakes were made. Not borne of ill will or bad intentions; quite the opposite, in fact. But mistakes nonetheless." Sunak had previously criticised Truss's economic policy plans during the July–September 2022 Conservative Party leadership election.

=== Calls for Truss's resignation ===
According to The Telegraph, as of 17 October, there were at least five Conservative MPs calling for Truss's resignation: Crispin Blunt, Andrew Bridgen, Angela Richardson, Charles Walker and Jamie Wallis. In an interview with the BBC's Chris Mason that evening Truss said she was "sorry for the mistakes that have been made" but remained "committed to the vision". She also said she would lead the Conservatives into the next general election. Lord Frost, on 18 October, had also called for the Prime Minister to resign.

Truss had meetings with Sir Graham Brady, the chair of the 1922 Committee on 17 and 20 October. The former meeting was stated to have caused Truss to miss an urgent question on the afternoon of 17 October requested by opposition leader Keir Starmer and granted by House of Commons Speaker Sir Lindsay Hoyle—with Leader of the House Penny Mordaunt answering on Truss's behalf. Truss's absence drew criticism from a number of MPs, including Starmer, although Truss later made a brief appearance in the House.

British tabloid newspaper Daily Star released a livestream of an iceberg lettuce on 14 October after The Economist compared Truss's term to "the shelf-life of a lettuce".

=== Resignations and vote on fracking ===
Home Secretary Suella Braverman resigned on 19 October and was replaced by Grant Shapps. The resignation was triggered by Braverman admitting to having shared an official document through her private email account with a parliamentary colleague. In her resignation letter, Braverman expressed "concerns about the direction of the government" and added that she "had serious concerns about this government's commitment to honouring manifesto commitments".

The same day, Labour Shadow Secretary of State for Climate Change and Net Zero Ed Miliband tabled an opposition day motion on the subject of fracking. Truss pledged as part of her leadership campaign to lift the moratorium on fracking, yet some Conservative MPs had expressed concern about the change as it went against their 2019 manifesto. The motion was a Programme Order, which, if carried, would have bound the House to consider and hold a vote on a Bill banning fracking, under the rules and timetable set in the Order itself. As the motion would have granted the opposition partial control the business of the House of Commons on certain days, the party whips strictly informed Conservative MPs to vote against it (a three-line whip). They were also informed that the vote would be treated as a matter of confidence.

As the day progressed, 10 Downing Street became increasingly concerned about the potential size of the rebellion among Conservative MPs and informed the climate minister, Graham Stuart, that the vote would no longer be treated as a matter of confidence. Although he subsequently relayed this to the House of Commons, the whips' office were not made aware of the change, resulting in confusion and disarray among Conservative MPs.

Soon after, William Wragg became the sixth MP to publicly call on the Prime Minister to go. Several Conservative MPs did not vote against the fracking motion. Confusion followed after the Minister Graham Stuart told Parliament "obviously this is not a confidence vote". Amid reports of Conservative MPs physically jostling their colleagues to vote against the Labour motion, the Chief Whip Wendy Morton and deputy chief whip Craig Whittaker were both thought to have resigned. Later it was clarified that they had not, and remained in their posts. An MP described the vote as "chaos" with claims, denied by cabinet ministers, that Conservative whips had manhandled and bullied backbenchers into voting against. Labour MP Chris Bryant made claims on Sky News saying that he saw MPs "physically manhandled through the voting lobby" naming Deputy Prime Minister Thérèse Coffey along with Jacob Rees-Mogg as those he saw in the "group". Later that evening, the Speaker of the House Lindsay Hoyle announced that he had asked the Serjeant at Arms and other parliamentary officials to investigate the allegations made about the incident. The fracking motion was ultimately defeated by a vote of 326–230, with 324 Conservative MPs opposing it.

During Prime Minister's Questions on 19 October, Labour Party leader Keir Starmer questioned why Truss had not resigned, to which she responded: "I am a fighter and not a quitter", a phrase first made famous by Peter Mandelson, a former Labour Party First Secretary of State.

=== Liz Truss resigns ===
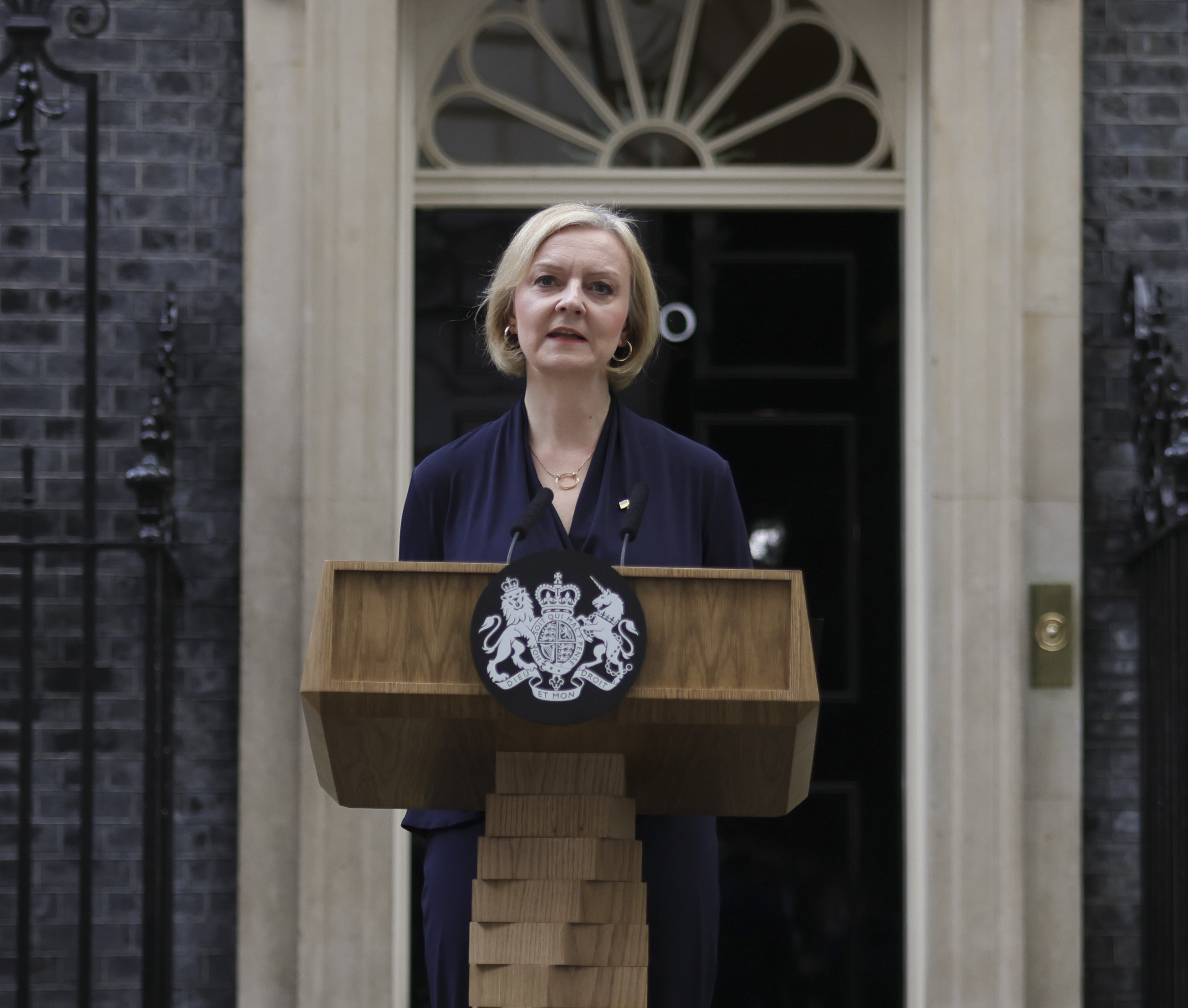
Truss announces her pending resignation outside 10 Downing Street on 20 October 2022; she left office on 25 October.

Truss announced her resignation as leader of the Conservative Party at 1:30 pm on 20 October 2022. In her speech, she stated that she could not "deliver the mandate on which I was elected by the Conservative Party". Truss confirmed that the subsequent leadership election would be held within the next week and that she would step down as prime minister when it concluded. Truss resigned as prime minister on 25 October on her 50th day in office thus making her the UK's shortest-serving prime minister.

In response to the resignation, Starmer and Sturgeon called for an immediate general election. Calls for an early election were also echoed by the Liberal Democrats and the Green Party. French President Emmanuel Macron said "it is important that Great Britain regains political stability very quickly, and that is all I wish." US President Joe Biden thanked Truss "for her partnership on a range of issues including holding Russia accountable for its war against Ukraine".

== Campaign ==
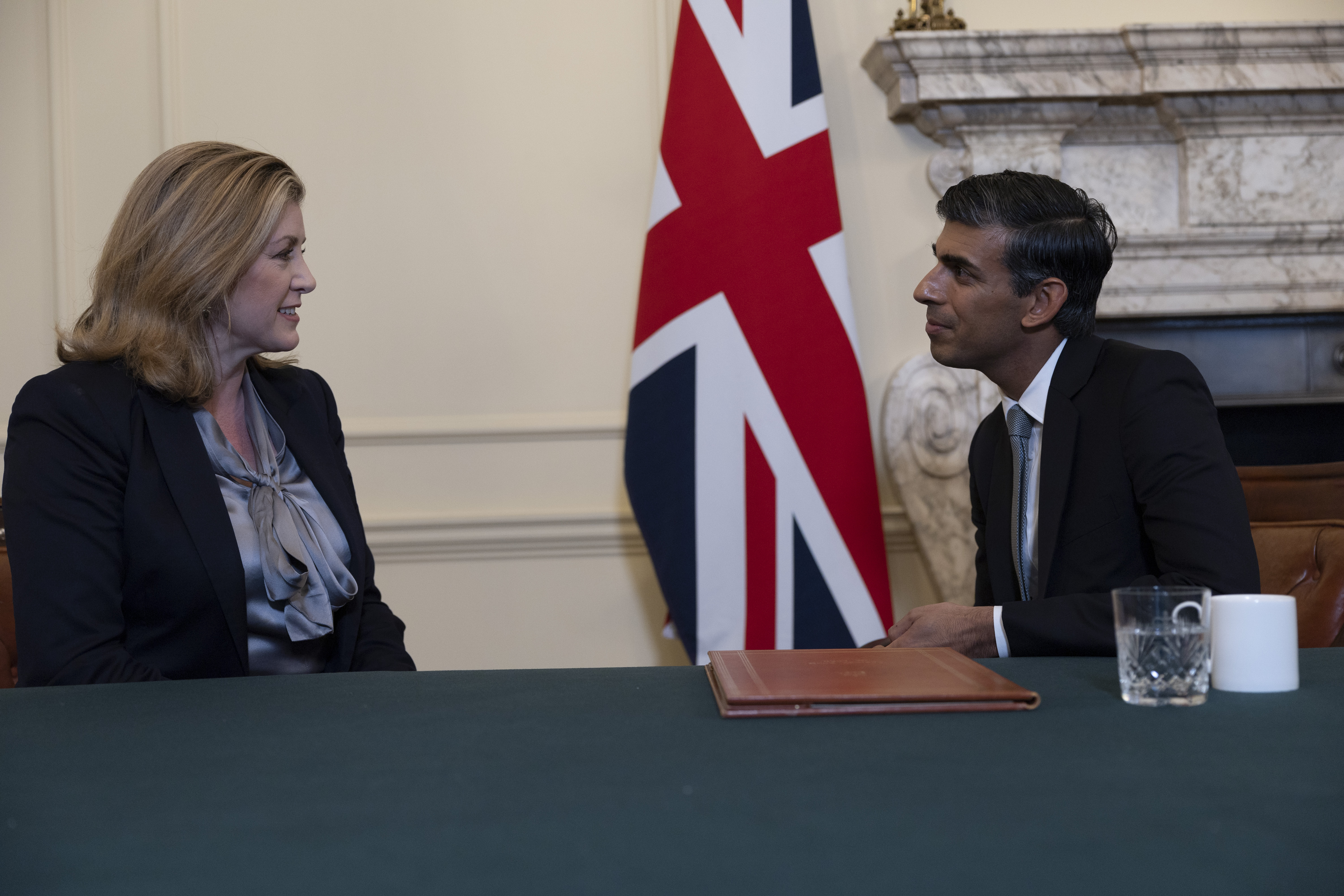
Penny Mordaunt and Rishi Sunak were the only two candidates to stand in the contest. As a result of Mordaunt's withdrawal, Sunak won the leadership contest unopposed.

On 20 October, Rishi Sunak, the former Chancellor of the Exchequer who came second in the September leadership election, Penny Mordaunt, the Leader of the House of Commons who came third, and Boris Johnson, who was the leader and prime minister before Truss, were seen as the most likely candidates.

On 20 October, the online bookmaker Betfair listed Sunak as the favourite to become the new Conservative Party leader with odds of 11/10, with Mordaunt second at 7/2, Wallace third at 8/1, Hunt fourth at 9/1 and Johnson fifth at 13/1.

While many MPs supported Johnson, others said they would not serve under him if he were elected. Mordaunt was reported to be taking soundings as to whether she should run on the evening of 20 October and morning of 21 October. On the afternoon of 21 October she became the first candidate to announce her intention to run. By the morning of 22 October, Sunak's supporters said he had passed the nomination threshold of 100 MPs, although he had yet to formally launch his campaign. Johnson flew back from a holiday in the Dominican Republic on the morning of Saturday 22 October, and by that afternoon, Johnson supporters said that he had sufficient nominations too. Reports of Johnson reaching the nomination threshold, which were later confirmed as being true by Sir Graham Brady, were met with scepticism by some Sunak supporters, who challenged the Johnson camp to release the names of his supporters. On the evening of 22 October, Sunak and Johnson met, although what they discussed was not disclosed.

On the afternoon of 23 October, Sunak declared he would stand in the contest. Sunak was backed by several cabinet members and prominent party members, such as Lord Frost, Kemi Badenoch, Nadhim Zahawi, Matt Hancock, Sajid Javid, Jeremy Hunt, Tom Tugendhat, James Cleverly, Ben Wallace, Priti Patel, Iain Duncan Smith, Michael Gove, and Dominic Raab. On the afternoon of the same day, Johnson spoke to Penny Mordaunt, with press speculation being that she had rejected an offer asking her to drop out of the leadership contest and back him. Later that day, Johnson said he would not be standing.

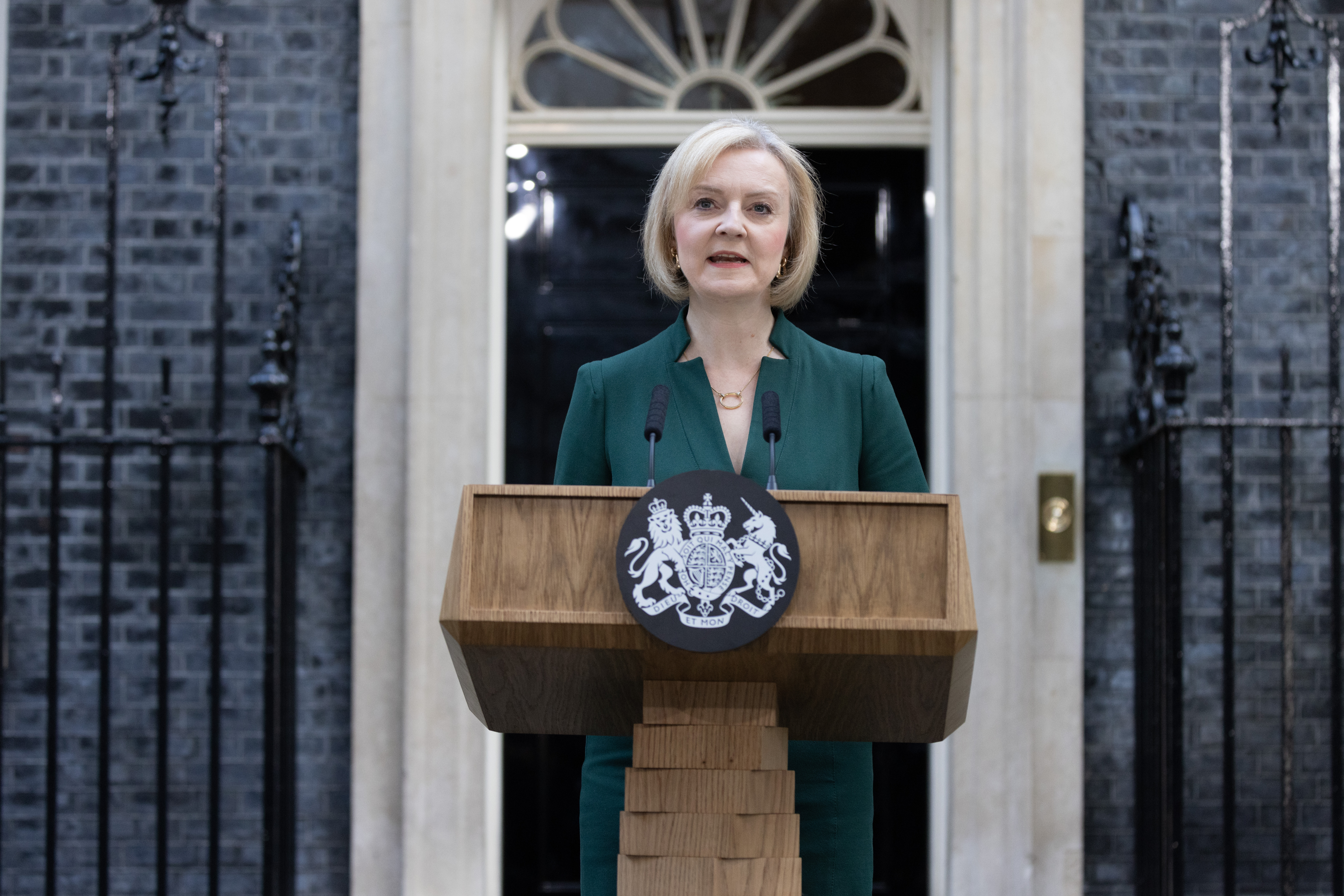
Truss giving her final speech as prime minister on 25 October.

On the afternoon on 24 October, Mordaunt pulled out of the race after being unable to get the nominations of 100 MPs by the deadline. As a result of Mordaunt's withdrawal, Sunak won the leadership contest unopposed, and became the leader of the Conservative Party. It was the first time a candidate won a leadership election for one of the two main parties unopposed since Gordon Brown won the Labour Party leadership election to succeed Tony Blair in 2007. In his victory speech, Sunak paid tribute to Truss and said that she "was not wrong" to want to implement growth and "admired her restlessness to create change", but admitted that "some mistakes were made" and promised to place economic stability and confidence at the heart of his government's agenda.

== Election process ==
In her resignation statement on 20 October, Truss stated that the election would be completed "within the next week". Graham Brady set out an expedited process. Candidates were required to obtain nominations from at least 100 MPs before the nomination deadline at 2 pm on 24 October. With 357 Conservative MPs at the time of election, this meant there could have only been, at most, three candidates.

Had three candidates reached the nomination threshold, a ballot of Conservative MPs would have been held to eliminate one that afternoon. An indicative vote by Conservative MPs between the final two would have then been held. Subsequently, there would have been an online ballot of Conservative Party members to choose between the two remaining candidates. This would have opened on Tuesday 25 October and closed at 11 am on Friday 28 October. If two candidates had reached the nomination threshold, there would have been an indicative vote by MPs, then an online members' vote, with the same schedule.

As only Rishi Sunak received the nominations required by Monday 24 October, he automatically became party leader.

The timetable was much shorter than the previous leadership election, with a higher bar for nominations. These changes, and the addition of an indicative vote by MPs between two final candidates, were introduced to narrow the field more quickly and reduce the probability that a ballot of party members would be required.

== Candidates ==
=== Declared ===
| Candidate | Political office and constituency | Date declared | Ref. |
|---|---|---|---|
| Rishi Sunak | Chancellor of the Exchequer (2020–2022); MP for Richmond (Yorks) (2015–present) | 23 October 2022 | |

=== Withdrawn ===
Penny Mordaunt declared her intention to stand for leadership but subsequently withdrew from the race.

| Candidate | Political office and constituency | Date declared | Date withdrew | Ref. |
|---|---|---|---|---|
| Penny Mordaunt | Leader of the House of Commons (2022–2024); MP for Portsmouth North (2010–2024) | 21 October 2022 | 24 October 2022 | |

=== Explored ===
Boris Johnson initially explored a possible candidacy for the leadership but subsequently declined to stand.

| Candidate | Political office and constituency | Date declined | Ref. |
|---|---|---|---|
| Boris Johnson | Prime Minister of the United Kingdom (2019–2022); MP for Uxbridge and South Ruislip (2015–2023) | 23 October 2022 | |

=== Declined ===
The following Conservative Party politicians were suggested by commentators as potential candidates for the leadership but declined to stand:

- Kemi Badenoch, Secretary of State for International Trade (September 2022 – February 2023) and MP for Saffron Walden (2017–2024) (endorsed Sunak)
- Suella Braverman, Home Secretary (6 September 2022 – 19 October 2022), (25 October 2022 – 13 November 2023) and MP for Fareham (2015–2024) (endorsed Sunak)
- James Cleverly, Foreign Secretary (September 2022 – November 2023), Home Secretary (November 2023 – July 2024) and MP for Braintree (2015–present) (endorsed Johnson then Sunak)
- Michael Gove, Secretary of State for Levelling Up, Housing and Communities (September 2021 – July 2022), (October 2022 – July 2024) and MP for Surrey Heath (2005–2024) (endorsed Sunak)
- Jeremy Hunt, Chancellor of the Exchequer (October 2022 – July 2024) and MP for South West Surrey (2005–2024) (endorsed Sunak)
- Sajid Javid, former Chancellor of the Exchequer (July 2019 – February 2020) and MP for Bromsgrove (2010–2024) (endorsed Sunak)
- Brandon Lewis, Secretary of State for Justice (September 2022 – October 2022) and MP for Great Yarmouth (2010–2024) (endorsed Sunak)
- Theresa May, former Prime Minister (July 2016 – July 2019) and MP for Maidenhead (1997–2024)
- Grant Shapps, Home Secretary (19 October 2022 – 25 October 2022) and MP for Welwyn Hatfield (2005–2024) (endorsed Sunak)
- Tom Tugendhat, Minister of State for Security (September 2022 – July 2024) and MP for Tonbridge and Malling (2015–2024) (endorsed Sunak)
- Ben Wallace, Secretary of State for Defence (July 2019 – August 2023) and MP for Wyre and Preston North (2005–2024) (endorsed Johnson)

== Endorsements ==
MP public endorsements
| Candidate | Endorsements | % |
|---|---|---|
| Rishi Sunak | 197 | 55.1 |
| Boris Johnson | 62 | 17.3 |
| Penny Mordaunt | 27 | 7.5 |
| No endorsement | 71 | 19.8 |

Note: Some endorsements are repeated due to MPs changing support after withdrawal.

== Responses ==
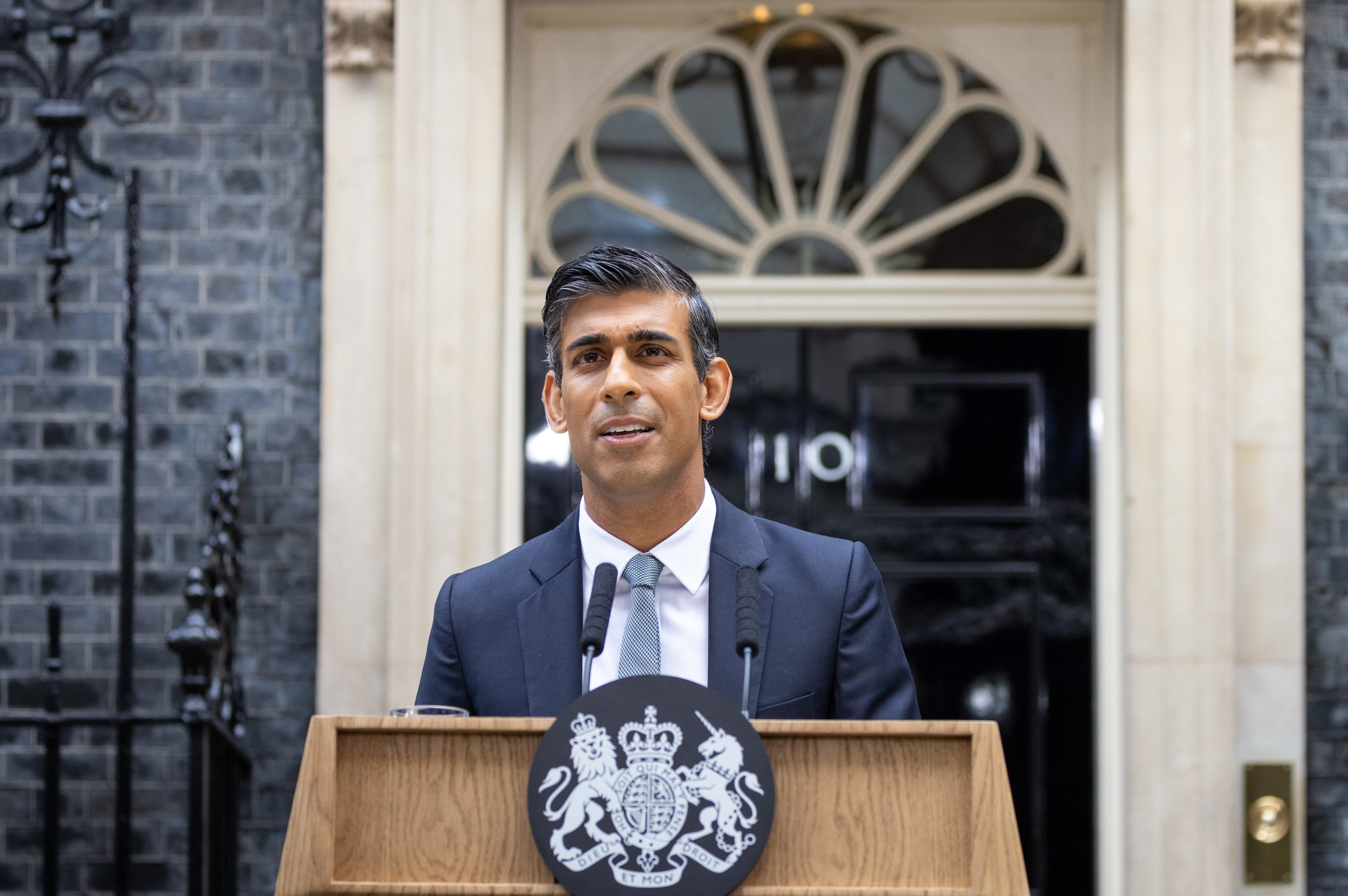
Sunak giving his first speech as prime minister on 25 October

While Sunak polled better than Truss, opinion polling continued to show the Conservatives losing to Labour shortly after Sunak became leader.

Following Sunak's cabinet reshuffle, a Downing Street source said "it reflects a unified party and a cabinet with significant experience". Many Conservative members were critical of the election, due to the lack of a members' vote and the unopposed candidate, characterising it as anti-democratic. Certain Tory MPs were unconvinced by the election, and stated that factionalism within the party was unlikely to disappear. Particularly, many Boris Johnson supporters felt cheated as they had voiced their vocal opposition to Sunak.

The election was characterised as undemocratic in an opinion piece by a Liverpool Echo journalist, by those on the left according to Time, and by opposition parties (including the Scottish National Party) who called for a general election. The Labour Party (and specifically Keir Starmer) also called for an early general election. Immediately following the election a poll conducted by Ipsos found that 62% of respondents wanted a general election.

== Polling ==
=== Conservative members ===
Multi-candidate polling

| Dates conducted | Pollster | Client | Sample size | Kemi Badenoch | Suella Braverman | Michael Gove | Jeremy Hunt | Boris Johnson | Penny Mordaunt | Grant Shapps | Rishi Sunak | Tom Tugendhat | Ben Wallace | Nadhim Zahawi | Others | Don't know |
|---|---|---|---|---|---|---|---|---|---|---|---|---|---|---|---|---|
| 20 Oct | Liz Truss announces her resignation as leader of the Conservative Party and as Prime Minister | | | | | | | | | | | | | | | |
| 17–18 Oct 2022 | YouGov | N/A | 530 Conservative members | 8% | 3% | 1% | 7% | 32% | 9% | 0% | 23% | 1% | 10% | 1% | 2% | 2% |

Liz Truss resignation polling

| Date(s) conducted | Pollster/client | Sample size | Should resign | Should not resign | Neither | Don't know | Margin |
|---|---|---|---|---|---|---|---|
| 17–18 Oct 2022 | YouGov | 530 Conservative members | 55% | 38% | —N/a | 7% | −17% |
| 17–18 Oct 2022 | YouGov | 218 Truss supporters | 39% | 57% | —N/a | 4% | +18% |
| 17–18 Oct 2022 | YouGov | 173 Sunak supporters | 72% | 17% | —N/a | 11% | −55% |

=== 2019 Conservative voters ===
Multi-candidate polling

| Dates conducted | Pollster | Client | Sample size | Kemi Badenoch | Suella Braverman | Jeremy Hunt | Boris Johnson | Penny Mordaunt | Rishi Sunak | Ben Wallace | Others | Don't know |
|---|---|---|---|---|---|---|---|---|---|---|---|---|
| 19–21 Oct 2022 | Opinium | N/A | 1,549 | —N/a | —N/a | 10% | —N/a | 19% | 45% | 11% | —N/a | 14% |
| 20 October 2022 | PeoplePolling | GB News | 367 | 3% | 2% | 2% | 38% | 4% | 20% | 2% | 7% Others Michael Gove 3% Sajid Javid 1% Grant Shapps 0% Nadhim Zahawi 0% | 21% |
| 20 October 2022 | Savanta ComRes | N/A | 1,094 | —N/a | 2% | —N/a | 41% | 8% | 25% | 4% | 4% Others Michael Gove 3% | 15% |

=== General population ===
Head-to-head polling

| Dates conducted | Pollster | Client | Sample size | Boris Johnson | Penny Mordaunt | Rishi Sunak | Others | Don't know |
|---|---|---|---|---|---|---|---|---|
| 23 October 2022 | Boris Johnson publicly declines to stand in the election | | | | | | | |
| 23 October 2022 | Opinium | N/A | 1,005 British voters | 27% | —N/a | 45% | —N/a | 27% |
| 20–21 Oct 2022 | Redfield & Wilton | N/A | 2,000 British voters | 36% | —N/a | 37% | —N/a | 27% |
| 20–21 Oct 2022 | Opinium | N/A | 1,350 British voters | 33% | 36% | —N/a | —N/a | 31% |
| 20–21 Oct 2022 | Opinium | N/A | 1,350 British voters | 31% | —N/a | 44% | —N/a | 25% |
| 20–21 Oct 2022 | Opinium | N/A | 1,350 British voters | —N/a | 23% | 45% | —N/a | 32% |

Multi-candidate polling

| Dates conducted | Pollster | Client | Sample size | Kemi Badenoch | Suella Braverman | Jeremy Hunt | Boris Johnson | Penny Mordaunt | Rishi Sunak | Ben Wallace | Others | Don't know |
|---|---|---|---|---|---|---|---|---|---|---|---|---|
| 19–21 Oct 2022 | Opinium | N/A | 1,350 British voters | —N/a | —N/a | 12% | —N/a | 14% | 38% | 10% | —N/a | 25% |
| 20 October 2022 | Savanta ComRes | N/A | 1,094 British voters | —N/a | 2% | —N/a | 21% | 8% | 26% | 6% | 8% Others Michael Gove 3% | 30% |
| 20 October 2022 | PeoplePolling | GB News | 1,237 British voters | 2% | 1% | 2% | 16% | 5% | 19% | 2% | 11% Others Michael Gove 3% Sajid Javid 2% Grant Shapps 0% Nadhim Zahawi 0% | 41% |
| 20 Oct | Liz Truss announces her resignation as leader of the Conservative Party and as Prime Minister | | | | | | | | | | | |
| 18–19 Oct 2022 | Opinium | ITV's Peston | TBA | —N/a | 2% | 7% | 17% | 8% | 25% | 7% | —N/a | 31% |
| 14–16 Oct 2022 | Portland Communications | N/A | 1,511 British voters | —N/a | —N/a | 5% | 16% | 5% | 21% | 3% | —N/a | 50% |
