= Truss ministry =

Government of the United Kingdom in 2022

- Cabinet of the United Kingdom
- September–October 2022
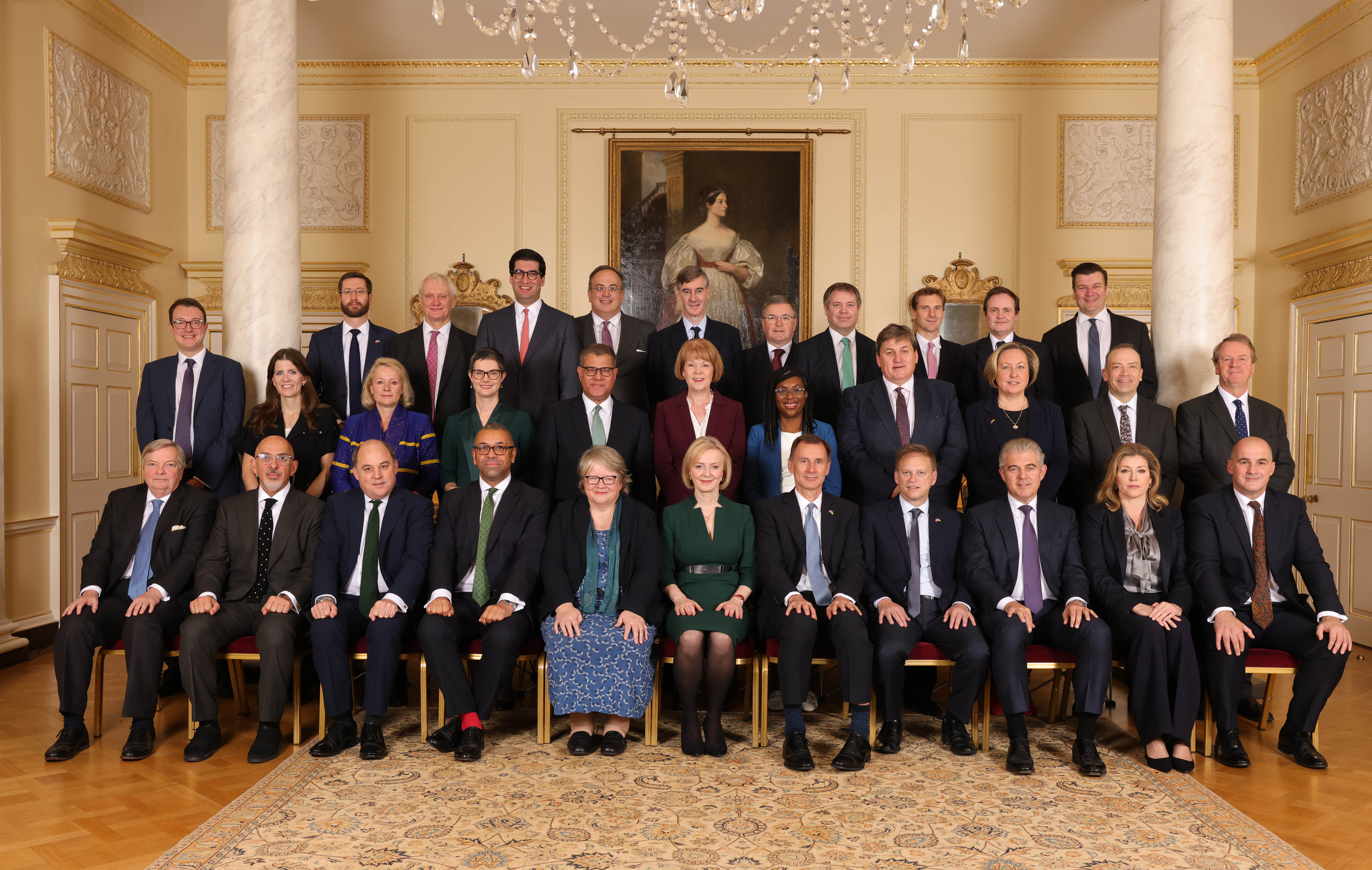
- Truss's cabinet in October 2022, on her last day in office
- Date formed: 6 September 2022
- Date dissolved: 25 October 2022

People and organisations
- Monarch: Elizabeth II (Sep 2022); Charles III (Sep–Oct 2022)
- Prime Minister: Liz Truss
- Deputy Prime Minister: Thérèse Coffey
- Ministers removed: 3 resigned
- Member party: Conservative Party
- Status in legislature: Majority government
- Opposition cabinet: Starmer shadow cabinet
- Opposition party: Labour Party
- Opposition leader: Keir Starmer

History
- Incoming formation: Jul–Sep 2022 leadership election
- Outgoing formation: October 2022 leadership election
- Legislature term: 2019–2024
- Budget: September 2022 mini-budget
- Predecessor: Second Johnson ministry
- Successor: Sunak ministry

The Truss ministry began on 6 September 2022 when Liz Truss was invited by Queen Elizabeth II—two days before the monarch's death—to succeed Boris Johnson as prime minister of the United Kingdom. Johnson had resigned as leader of the Conservative Party the previous day after Truss was elected as his successor. The Truss ministry was formed from the 2019 Parliament of the United Kingdom, as a Conservative majority government.

On 20 October 2022, amid growing disapproval of her leadership from within the Conservative Party, Truss announced her resignation, making her tenure the shortest in the history of the United Kingdom. She resigned as Conservative Party leader on 24 October and as prime minister on 25 October. The cabinet was dissolved following the appointment of Rishi Sunak as prime minister on 25 October.

With the appointment of Kwasi Kwarteng as Chancellor of the Exchequer, James Cleverly as Foreign Secretary, and Suella Braverman as Home Secretary, for the first time in British political history, no white men held positions in the Great Offices of State.

== Cabinet ==
=== September 2022 – October 2022 ===
Truss Cabinet
Portfolio	Portrait	Minister	Term
Cabinet ministers
Prime Minister; First Lord of the Treasury; Minister for the Civil Service; Minister for the Union		Liz Truss	September 2022 – October 2022
Deputy Prime Minister; Secretary of State for Health and Social Care		Thérèse Coffey	September 2022 – October 2022
Chancellor of the Exchequer; Second Lord of the Treasury		Kwasi Kwarteng	September 2022 – October 2022
Chancellor of the Exchequer; Second Lord of the Treasury		Jeremy Hunt	October 2022 – July 2024
Foreign Secretary		James Cleverly	September 2022 – November 2023
Home Secretary		Suella Braverman	September 2022 – October 2022
Home Secretary		Grant Shapps	October 2022
Secretary of State for Defence		Ben Wallace	July 2019 – August 2023
Secretary of State for Justice; Lord High Chancellor of Great Britain		Brandon Lewis	September 2022 – October 2022
Chancellor of the Duchy of Lancaster; Minister for Intergovernmental Relations; Minister for Equalities		Nadhim Zahawi	September 2022 – October 2022
Leader of the House of Commons; Lord President of the Council		Penny Mordaunt	September 2022 – July 2024
Leader of the House of Lords; Lord Keeper of the Privy Seal		Nicholas True; Baron True	September 2022 – July 2024
Minister without Portfolio; Party Chairman (Note: Non-governmental position) (unpaid)		Sir; Jake Berry	September 2022 – October 2022
President for COP26 (Note: Formally, Minister of State in the Cabinet Office)		Alok Sharma	January 2021 – November 2022
Secretary of State for Business, Energy and Industrial Strategy		Jacob Rees-Mogg	September 2022 – October 2022
Secretary of State for Levelling Up, Housing and Communities		Simon Clarke	September 2022 – October 2022
Secretary of State for International Trade		Kemi Badenoch	September 2022 – February 2023
President of the Board of Trade		Kemi Badenoch	September 2022 – July 2024
Secretary of State for Work and Pensions		Chloe Smith	September 2022 – October 2022
Secretary of State for Education		Kit Malthouse	September 2022 – October 2022
Secretary of State for Environment, Food and Rural Affairs		Ranil Jayawardena	September 2022 – October 2022
Secretary of State for Transport		Anne-Marie Trevelyan	September 2022 – October 2022
Secretary of State for Digital, Culture, Media and Sport		Michelle Donelan	September 2022 – February 2023
Secretary of State for Northern Ireland		Chris Heaton-Harris	September 2022 – July 2024
Secretary of State for Scotland		Alister Jack	July 2019 – July 2024
Secretary of State for Wales		Sir; Robert Buckland	July 2022 – October 2022
Also attending cabinet meetings
Parliamentary Secretary to the Treasury; Chief Whip of the House of Commons		Wendy Morton	September 2022 – October 2022
Chief Secretary to the Treasury		Chris Philp	September 2022 – October 2022
Chief Secretary to the Treasury		Edward Argar	October 2022
Attorney General for England and Wales; Advocate General for Northern Ireland		Michael Ellis	September 2022 – October 2022
Minister for the Cabinet Office; Paymaster General		Edward Argar	September 2022 – October 2022
Minister for the Cabinet Office; Paymaster General		Chris Philp	October 2022
Minister of State for Development (Foreign, Commonwealth and Development Office)		Vicky Ford	September 2022 – October 2022
Minister of State for Security (Home Office)		Tom Tugendhat	September 2022 – July 2024
Minister of State for the Armed Forces and Veterans (Ministry of Defence)		James Heappey	February 2020 – March 2024
Minister of State for Climate (Department for Business, Energy and Industrial Strategy)		Graham Stuart	September 2022 – July 2024

==== Changes ====
- Kwasi Kwarteng was dismissed on 14 October 2022 after market turmoil following the September mini-budget. He was replaced by former Foreign Secretary Jeremy Hunt. Chris Philp swapped jobs with Edward Argar on the same day.
- Suella Braverman resigned as Home Secretary on 19 October 2022. She was replaced by former Transport Secretary Grant Shapps.

== List of ministers ==
Minister in the House of Commons	Minister in the House of Lords
Cabinet ministers and ministers that attend cabinet are listed **in bold**

=== Prime Minister and Cabinet Office ===
Cabinet Office
Post	Minister	Term
Prime Minister of the United Kingdom; First Lord of the Treasury; Minister for the Civil Service; Minister for the Union	**Liz Truss**	September 2022 – October 2022
Chancellor of the Duchy of Lancaster; Minister for Intergovernmental Relations	**Nadhim Zahawi**	September 2022 – October 2022
Minister for the Cabinet Office; Paymaster General	**Edward Argar**	September – October 2022
Minister for the Cabinet Office; Paymaster General	**Chris Philp**	October 2022
Minister without Portfolio; Party Chairman	**Sir Jake Berry** (unpaid)	September 2022 – October 2022
President for COP26	**Alok Sharma**	February 2020 – November 2022
Minister of State	Lucy Neville-Rolfe, Baroness Neville-Rolfe	September 2022 – July 2024
Minister of State	Dominic Johnson, Baron Johnson of Lainston (unpaid, also Minister of State at International Trade)	October 2022
Parliamentary Secretary	Brendan Clarke-Smith	September 2022 – October 2022
Minister for Women	Katherine Fletcher (also Parliamentary Under Secretary of State at Transport)	September 2022 – October 2022
Parliamentary Secretary (Minister for Equalities)	Deborah Stedman-Scott, Baroness Stedman-Scott (also Parliamentary Under Secretary of State at Work and Pensions	September 2022 – October 2022

=== Departments of state ===
Business, Energy and Industrial Strategy
Secretary of State for Business, Energy and Industrial Strategy	**Jacob Rees-Mogg**	September 2022 – October 2022
Minister of State for Climate	**Graham Stuart**	September 2022 – July 2024
Minister of State for Industry	Jackie Doyle-Price	September 2022 – October 2022
Minister of State for Science and Investment Security	Nus Ghani	September 2022 – July 2024
Parliamentary Under-Secretary of State for Enterprise and Markets	Dean Russell	September 2022 – October 2022
Parliamentary Under-Secretary of State for Business, Energy and Corporate Responsibility	Martin Callanan, Baron Callanan	February 2020 – July 2024

Defence
Secretary of State for Defence	**Ben Wallace**	July 2019 – August 2023
Minister of State for the Armed Forces and Veterans	**James Heappey**	February 2020 – July 2024
Minister of State for Defence	Annabel Goldie, Baroness Goldie (unpaid)	July 2019 – July 2024
Minister of State for Defence Procurement	Alec Shelbrooke	September 2022 – October 2022
Parliamentary Under Secretary of State for Defence People, Veterans and Service Families	Sarah Atherton	September 2022 – October 2022

Digital, Culture, Media and Sport
Secretary of State for Digital, Culture, Media and Sport	**Michelle Donelan**	September 2022 – February 2023
Minister of State for Media, Data, and Digital Infrastructure	Julia Lopez	September 2022 – July 2024
Parliamentary Under-Secretary of State for Tech and the Digital Economy	Damian Collins	July 2022 – October 2022
Parliamentary Under-Secretary of State for Sport, Arts and Ceremonials	Stuart Andrew	September 2022 – July 2024
Parliamentary Under-Secretary of State for Civil Society, Heritage, Tourism and Growth	Syed Kamall, Baron Kamall	September 2022 – October 2022

Education
Secretary of State for Education	**Kit Malthouse**	September 2022 – October 2022
Minister of State for Schools and Childhood	Kelly Tolhurst	September 2022 – October 2022
Parliamentary Under-Secretary of State for School Standards	Jonathan Gullis	September 2022 – October 2022
Parliamentary Under Secretary of State for Skills	Andrea Jenkyns	July 2022 – October 2022
Parliamentary Under-Secretary of State for the School and College System	Diana Barran, Baroness Barran (unpaid)	September 2021 – July 2024

Environment, Food and Rural Affairs
Secretary of State for Environment, Food and Rural Affairs	Ranil Jayawardena	September 2022 – October 2022
Minister of State for Food	Mark Spencer	September 2022 – July 2024
Parliamentary Under Secretary of State for Environment	Trudy Harrison	September 2022 – July 2024
Parliamentary Under-Secretary of State for Growth and Rural Affairs	Scott Mann	September 2022 – October 2022
Parliamentary Under-Secretary of State for International Environment	Richard Benyon, Baron Benyon (unpaid)	May 2021 – October 2022

Equalities Office
Minister for Equalities	**Nadhim Zahawi**	September 2022 – October 2022
Minister for Women	Katherine Fletcher (also at Transport and Cabinet Office)	September 2022 – October 2022
Parliamentary Secretary (Minister for Equalities)	Deborah Stedman-Scott, Baroness Stedman-Scott (also at Work and Pensions and Cabinet Office)	September 2022 – October 2022

Foreign, Commonwealth and Development Office
Secretary of State for Foreign, Commonwealth and Development Affairs	**James Cleverly**	September 2022 – July 2024
Minister of State for Development	**Vicky Ford**	September 2022 – October 2022
Minister of State for Europe	Leo Docherty	September 2022 – July 2024
Minister of State for the Americas and the Overseas Territories	Jesse Norman	September 2022 – October 2022
Minister of State for the Middle East, South Asia and the United Nations	Tariq Ahmad, Baron Ahmad of Wimbledon	June 2017 – July 2024
Minister of State for Asia, Energy, Climate and Environment	Zac Goldsmith, Baron Goldsmith of Richmond Park (unpaid)	September 2022 – July 2024
Parliamentary Under Secretary of State for Africa	Gillian Keegan	September 2022 – October 2022

Health and Social Care
Deputy Prime Minister; Secretary of State for Health and Social Care	**Thérèse Coffey**	September 2022 – October 2022
Minister of State	Robert Jenrick	September 2022 – October 2022
Minister of State	Will Quince	September 2022 – July 2024
Parliamentary Under Secretary of State	Neil O'Brien	September 2022 – July 2024
Parliamentary Under Secretary of State	Caroline Johnson	September 2022 – October 2022
Parliamentary Under Secretary of State	Nick Markham, Baron Markham (unpaid)	September 2022 – July 2024

Home Office
Secretary of State for the Home Department	**Suella Braverman**	September 2022 – October 2022
Secretary of State for the Home Department	**Grant Shapps**	October 2022
Minister of State for Security	**Tom Tugendhat**	September 2022 – July 2024
Minister of State for Immigration	Tom Pursglove	September 2022 – October 2022
Minister of State for Crime, Policing and Fire	Jeremy Quin	September 2022 – October 2022
Minister of State	Simon Murray, Baron Murray of Blidworth	October 2022
Parliamentary Under Secretary of State	Andrew Sharpe, Baron Sharpe of Epsom	September 2022 – July 2024
Parliamentary Under-Secretary of State for Safeguarding	Mims Davies	September 2022 – October 2022

International Trade
Secretary of State for International Trade	**Kemi Badenoch**	September 2022 – February 2023
President of the Board of Trade	**Kemi Badenoch**	September 2022 – July 2024
Minister of State for Trade Policy	Conor Burns	September 2022 – October 2022
Minister of State for Trade Policy	Greg Hands	October 2022 – February 2023
Minister of State for International Trade	Sir James Duddridge	September 2022 – October 2022
Parliamentary Under-Secretary of State for Exports	Marcus Fysh	September 2022 – October 2022
Minister of State for Investment	Dominic Johnson, Baron Johnson of Lainston (unpaid, also Minister of State at the Cabinet Office)	October 2022

Justice
Secretary of State for Justice; Lord High Chancellor of Great Britain	**Brandon Lewis**	September 2022 – October 2022
Minister of State	Rachel Maclean	September 2022 – October 2022
Parliamentary Under-Secretary of State	Christopher Bellamy, Baron Bellamy (unpaid)	June 2022 – July 2024
Parliamentary Under Secretary of State	Gareth Johnson	September 2022 – October 2022
Parliamentary Under Secretary of State	Mike Freer	September 2022 – July 2024
Parliamentary Under Secretary of State	Rob Butler	September 2022 – October 2022

Levelling Up, Housing and Communities
Secretary of State for Levelling Up, Housing and Communities	**Simon Clarke**	September 2022 – October 2022
Minister for Local Government and Building Safety, Minister for London	Paul Scully	February 2020 – October 2022
Parliamentary Under Secretary of State for Housing and Communities	Andrew Stephenson	September 2022 – October 2022
Parliamentary Under Secretary of State for Levelling Up	Dehenna Davison	September 2022 – July 2024
Parliamentary Under Secretary of State for Housing	Lee Rowley	September 2022 – October 2022
Parliamentary Under Secretary of State for Communities	Jane Scott, Baroness Scott of Bybrook	September 2022 – July 2024

Northern Ireland Office
Secretary of State for Northern Ireland	**Chris Heaton-Harris**	September 2022 – July 2024
Minister of State for Northern Ireland	Steve Baker	September 2022 – July 2024
Parliamentary Under-Secretary of State for Northern Ireland	Jonathan Caine, Baron Caine (unpaid)	November 2021 – July 2024

Scotland Office
Secretary of State for Scotland	**Alister Jack**	July 2019 – July 2024
Parliamentary Under-Secretary of State for Scotland	David Duguid	September 2022 – October 2022
Parliamentary Under-Secretary of State for Scotland	Malcolm Offord, Baron Offord of Garvel (unpaid)	October 2021 – July 2024

Transport
Secretary of State for Transport	**Anne-Marie Trevelyan**	September 2022 – October 2022
Minister of State	Kevin Foster	September 2022 – October 2022
Minister of State	Lucy Frazer	September 2022 – October 2022
Parliamentary Under-Secretary of State	Charlotte Vere, Baroness Vere of Norbiton	April 2019 – July 2024
Parliamentary Under Secretary of State (also Minister for Women at the Cabinet Office)	Katherine Fletcher	September 2022 – October 2022

Treasury
Chancellor of the Exchequer; Second Lord of the Treasury	**Kwasi Kwarteng**	September 2022 – October 2022
Chancellor of the Exchequer; Second Lord of the Treasury	**Jeremy Hunt**	October 2022 – July 2024
Chief Secretary to the Treasury	**Chris Philp**	September 2022 – October 2022
Chief Secretary to the Treasury	**Edward Argar**	October 2022
Financial Secretary to the Treasury and City Minister	Andrew Griffith (unpaid)	September 2022 – October 2022
Economic Secretary to the Treasury	Richard Fuller (unpaid)	July 2022 – October 2022
Exchequer Secretary to the Treasury	Felicity Buchan	September 2022 – October 2022

Wales Office
Secretary of State for Wales	**Sir Robert Buckland**	July 2022 – October 2022
Parliamentary Under-Secretary of State	David TC Davies	December 2019 – October 2022

Work and Pensions
Secretary of State for Work and Pensions	**Chloe Smith**	September 2022 – October 2022
Minister of State for Work and Welfare	Victoria Prentis	September 2022 – October 2022
Parliamentary Under-Secretary of State for Pensions and Growth	Alex Burghart	September 2022 – October 2022
Parliamentary Under-Secretary of State for Disabled People, Health and Work	Claire Coutinho	September 2022 – October 2022
Parliamentary Under Secretary of State	Deborah Stedman-Scott, Baroness Stedman-Scott (also Parliamentary Secretary at the Cabinet Office)	September 2022 – January 2023

=== Law officers ===
Attorney General's Office
Attorney General for England and Wales	**Michael Ellis**	September 2022 – October 2022
Solicitor General for England and Wales	Michael Tomlinson	September 2022 – December 2023

Office of the Advocate General
Advocate General for Scotland	Keith Stewart, Baron Stewart of Dirleton	October 2020 – July 2024

=== Parliament ===
House Leaders
Leader of the House of Lords; Lord Keeper of the Privy Seal	**Nicholas True, Baron True**	September 2022 – July 2024
Leader of the House of Commons; Lord President of the Council	**Penny Mordaunt**	September 2022 – July 2024
Deputy Leader of the House of Lords	Frederick Curzon, 7th Earl Howe (unpaid)	May 2015 – July 2024

House of Commons Whips
Chief Whip of the House of Commons; Parliamentary Secretary to the Treasury	**Wendy Morton**	September 2022 – October 2022
Deputy Chief Whip; Treasurer of HM Household	Craig Whittaker	September 2022 – October 2022
Whip; Comptroller of HM Household	Rebecca Harris	July 2022 – July 2024
Whip; Vice-Chamberlain of the Household	Jo Churchill	September 2022 – July 2024
Whips; Lords Commissioners of the Treasury	Sir David Evennett	September 2022 – October 2022
Whips; Lords Commissioners of the Treasury	Amanda Solloway	September 2022 – July 2024
Whips; Lords Commissioners of the Treasury	Adam Holloway	September 2022 – October 2022
Whips; Lords Commissioners of the Treasury	Sarah Dines	September 2022 – October 2022
Whips; Lords Commissioners of the Treasury	Nigel Huddleston	September 2022 – July 2024
Assistant Whips	Joy Morrissey	July 2022 – July 2024
Assistant Whips	Stuart Anderson	July 2022 – July 2024
Assistant Whips	Lia Nici	September 2022 – October 2022
Assistant Whips	Darren Henry	September 2022 – October 2022
Assistant Whips	Damien Moore	September 2022 – October 2022
Assistant Whips	Jacob Young	September 2022 – July 2024
Assistant Whips	Mark Jenkinson	September 2022 – October 2022

House of Lords Whips
Captain of the Honourable Corps of Gentlemen-at-Arms; Chief Whip of the House of Lords	Susan Williams, Baroness Williams of Trafford	September 2022 – July 2024
Deputy Chief Whip; Captain of the Yeomen of the Guard	Patrick Stopford, 9th Earl of Courtown	July 2016 – July 2024
Whips; Baronesses and Lords in waiting	Olivia Bloomfield, Baroness Bloomfield of Hinton Waldrist	July 2019 – July 2024
Whips; Baronesses and Lords in waiting	James Younger, 5th Viscount Younger of Leckie	February 2020 – January 2023
Whips; Baronesses and Lords in waiting	Jasset Ormsby-Gore, 7th Baron Harlech	September 2022 – July 2024
Whips; Baronesses and Lords in waiting	Byron Davies, Baron Davies of Gower	September 2022 – July 2024

== Departures from the Truss ministry ==
There were resignations from the Truss ministry after forming a government on 6 September 2022. Truss faced the departure of two cabinet ministers and one junior minister. In addition, she dismissed ministers that served under the previous government. (Note: Note: This list does not include those ministers that resigned prior to Liz Truss taking office as Prime Minister.)

Minister (Cabinet members shown in bold)	Office	Date of resignation	Reason
Conor Burns	Minister of State for Trade Policy	7 October 2022	Dismissed from the government and whip suspended 'following a complaint of serious misconduct' while Burns attended 2022 Conservative Party Conference.
**Kwasi Kwarteng**	Chancellor of the Exchequer	14 October 2022	Dismissed from the government over the financial situation and the aftermath of the mini-budget.
**Suella Braverman**	Home Secretary	19 October 2022	Sent highly sensitive information to a fellow Conservative MP who was not authorised to see it, from her personal email address.

== Non-ministerial appointments ==
=== Parliamentary Private Secretaries ===
Office or ministerial team	Incumbent	Parliamentary Private Secretary	Tenure
No.10 Downing Street
Parliamentary Private Secretary to the Prime Minister	Liz Truss	Suzanne Webb	September 2022 – October 2022
Parliamentary Private Secretary to the Deputy Prime Minister	Thérèse Coffey	Fay Jones	September 2022 – October 2022
Cabinet Office
Parliamentary Private Secretary to the Chancellor of the Duchy of Lancaster, Minister for Intergovernmental Relations and Minister for Equalities	Nadhim Zahawi	Laura Trott	September 2022 – October 2022
Parliamentary Private Secretary to the Minister for the Cabinet Office and Paymaster General	Chris Philp	Laura Trott	September 2022 – October 2022
Parliamentary Private Secretary to the Minister without Portfolio and Chairman of the Conservative Party	Sir Jake Berry	Ben Spencer	September 2022 – July 2024
Parliamentary Private Secretary to the President for COP26	Alok Sharma	Anthony Mangnall	September 2022 – October 2022
Parliamentary Private Secretary to the Cabinet Office		Peter Gibson	September 2022 – October 2022
Department for Health and Social Care
Parliamentary Private Secretary to the Secretary of State for Health and Social Care	Thérèse Coffey	James Sunderland	September 2022 – October 2022
Parliamentary Private Secretary to the Department for Health and Social Care		Duncan Baker	September 2022 – July 2024
HM Treasury
Parliamentary Private Secretary to the Chancellor of the Exchequer	Jeremy Hunt	Mark Fletcher	September 2022 – October 2022
Parliamentary Private Secretary to the Chief Secretary to the Treasury	Edward Argar	James Davies	September 2022 – October 2022
Parliamentary Private Secretary to HM Tresaury		Paul Howell	September 2022 – July 2024
Foreign, Commonwealth and Development Office
Parliamentary Private Secretary to the Secretary of State for Foreign, Commonwealth and Development Affairs	James Cleverly	Gagan Mohindra	September 2022 – July 2024
Parliamentary Private Secretary to the Foreign, Commonwealth and Development Office		Cherilyn Mackrory	September 2022 – July 2024
Home Office
Parliamentary Private Secretary to the Secretary of State for the Home Department	Grant Shapps	Gareth Davies	September 2022 – October 2022
Parliamentary Private Secretary to the Home Office		Shaun Bailey	September 2022 – July 2024
Ministry of Justice
Parliamentary Private Secretary to the Lord Chancellor and Secretary of State for Justice	Brandon Lewis	Aaron Bell	September 2022 – October 2022
Parliamentary Private Secretary to the Ministry of Justice		Gareth Bacon	September 2022 – October 2022
Ministry of Defence
Parliamentary Private Secretary to the Secretary of State for Defence	Ben Wallace	Ian Levy	September 2022 – July 2024
Parliamentary Private Secretary to the Ministry of Defence		Mark Eastwood	September 2022 – July 2024
Department for Levelling Up, Housing and Communities
Parliamentary Private Secretary to the Secretary of State for Levelling Up, Housing and Communities	Simon Clarke	Jason McCartney	September 2022 – October 2022
Parliamentary Private Secretary to the Department for Levelling Up, Housing and Communities		Simon Jupp	September 2022 – October 2022
Department for Business, Energy and Industrial Strategy
Parliamentary Private Secretary to the Secretary of State for Business, Energy and Industrial Strategy	Jacob Rees-Mogg	Luke Evans	September 2022 – July 2024
Parliamentary Private Secretary to the Department for Business, Energy and Industrial Strategy		Jane Stevenson	September 2022 – July 2024
Department for International Trade
Parliamentary Private Secretary to the Secretary of State for International Trade and President of the Board of Trade	Kemi Badenoch	Richard Holden	September 2022 – October 2022
Parliamentary Private Secretary to the Department for International Trade		Anna Firth	September 2022 – October 2022
Department for Work and Pensions
Parliamentary Private Secretary to the Secretary of State for Work and Pensions	Chloe Smith	Jerome Mayhew	September 2022 – October 2022
Parliamentary Private Secretary to the Department for Work and Pensions		David Johnston	September 2022 – October 2022
Department for Education
Parliamentary Private Secretary to the Secretary of State for Education	Kit Malthouse	Scott Benton	September 2022 – October 2022
Parliamentary Private Secretary to the Department for Education		Robbie Moore	September 2022 – July 2024
Department for Environment, Food and Rural Affairs
Parliamentary Private Secretary to the Secretary of State for Environment, Food and Rural Affairs	Ranil Jayawardena	Laura Farris	September 2022 – October 2022
Parliamentary Private Secretary to the Department for Environment, Food and Rural Affairs		Antony Higginbotham	September 2022 – October 2022
Department for Transport
Parliamentary Private Secretary to the Secretary of State for Transport	Anne-Marie Trevelyan	Marco Longhi	September 2022 – October 2022
Parliamentary Private Secretary to the Department for Transport		Anthony Browne	September 2022 – October 2022
Northern Ireland Office
Parliamentary Private Secretary to the Secretary of State for Northern Ireland	Chris Heaton-Harris	Tom Hunt	September 2022 – July 2024
Parliamentary Private Secretary to the Northern Ireland Office		Tom Hunt	September 2022 – July 2024
Office of the Secretary of State for Scotland
Parliamentary Private Secretary to the Secretary of State for Scotland	Alister Jack	Anthony Mangnall	September 2022 – October 2022
Office of the Secretary of State for Wales
Parliamentary Private Secretary to the Secretary of State for Wales	Robert Buckland	Robin Millar	September 2022 – July 2024
Department for Digital, Culture, Media and Sport
Parliamentary Private Secretary to the Secretary of State for Digital, Culture, Media and Sport	Michelle Donelan	Paul Bristow	September 2022 – July 2024
Parliamentary Private Secretary to the Department for Digital, Culture, Media and Sport		Simon Baynes	September 2022 – July 2024
Parliamentary House Leaders
Parliamentary Private Secretary to the Leader of the House of Commons and Lord President of the Council	Penny Mordaunt	Nicola Richards	September 2022 – July 2024
Parliamentary Private Secretary to the Leader of the House of Lords and Lord Privy Seal	Nicholas True, Baron True	Chris Clarkson	September 2022 – July 2024
Attorney General's Office
Parliamentary Private Secretary to the Attorney General for England and Wales and Advocate General for Northern Ireland	Michael Ellis	James Wild	September 2022 – October 2022

=== Prime Minister's Office ===
Prime Minister's Office
Principal Private Secretary to the Prime Minister	Nick Catsaras	September 2022 – October 2022
Downing Street Chief of Staff	Mark Fullbrook	September 2022 – October 2022
Prime Minister's Official Spokesperson	Max Blain	April 2021 – July 2024
Political Secretary to the Prime Minister	Sophie Jarvis	September 2022 – October 2022
Downing Street Director of Communications (political)	Adam Jones	September 2022 – October 2022
Downing Street Director of Communications (government)	Simon McGee	September 2022 – October 2022
Director of the Number 10 Policy Unit	Jamie Hope	September 2022 – October 2022
Director of the Number 10 Economic Policy Unit	Matthew Sinclair	September 2022 – October 2022

=== Second Church Estates Commissioner ===
Commissioner
Second Church Estates Commissioner	Andrew Selous	January 2020 – July 2024

== Notes ==
Preceded by Second Johnson ministry	Government of the United Kingdom; 2022	Succeeded by Sunak ministry
