= Liz Truss lettuce =

Vegetable used as political commentary

The Daily Star livestream on 20 October 2022, featuring the lettuce several hours after Liz Truss announced her resignation

On 14 October 2022, British tabloid newspaper the Daily Star began a livestream of an iceberg lettuce next to a framed photograph of Liz Truss, who had been appointed prime minister of the United Kingdom the previous month. This act followed an opinion piece in The Economist that compared the expected brevity of Truss' premiership to the shelf life of a head of lettuce, with the October 2022 United Kingdom government crisis occurring weeks into her tenure and leading many political commentators to opine that Truss' resignation was imminent.

Truss announced her resignation as prime minister on 20 October 2022 having served just 49 days in office, the shortest tenure in British history, before the lettuce had wilted. Politicians, commentators, media outlets, and advertising campaigns, especially in the United Kingdom, would proceed to use similar comparisons of lettuces for vulnerable politicians and movements.

== Background ==
Liz Truss became Prime Minister of the United Kingdom on 6 September 2022, following the July–September 2022 Conservative Party leadership election, replacing Boris Johnson. The September 2022 United Kingdom mini-budget was published on 23 September by Kwasi Kwarteng, then-Chancellor of the Exchequer, which included tax cuts without matching spending cuts. The mini-budget triggered a heavily negative market reaction, with the exchange rate of the pound sterling collapsing and pension funds coming close to bankruptcy.

After just over a month in office, Kwarteng was removed as Chancellor of the Exchequer on 14 October, and Truss reversed most of the economic policies within the mini-budget. British media outlets lambasted Truss' performance and the ensuing political chaos, with many observers believing that her resignation would be imminent. An 11 October column in The Economist titled "Liz Truss has made Britain a riskier bet for bond investors" stated that, after deducting the ten-day mourning period following the death of Queen Elizabeth II, Truss had caused economic and political turmoil after just seven days in power, comparing that duration to the "shelf-life of a lettuce". The publication further dubbed her the "Iceberg Lady", in contrast with the "Iron Lady", a nickname for the former British prime minister Margaret Thatcher, a political idol of Truss. The lettuce comparison was made by The Economist executive editor Andrew Palmer.

== The lettuce ==
Denis Mann, a deputy editor of the British entertainment-focused tabloid newspaper the Daily Star, read the column in The Economist and on 14 October mentioned it to Jon Clark, the newspaper's chief editor, who saw potential in the idea. On the same day, the Daily Star's video team began broadcasting a livestream of an iceberg lettuce next to a framed photograph of Truss, asking the audience whether Truss would be able to outlast the lettuce.

The Daily Star hosted the livestream with the title "LIVE: Can Liz Truss outlast a lettuce?" on YouTube. The outlet had been known to make light of contemporary political events, such as Brexit, while generally not adopting a particular political stance. The lettuce had been purchased from a Tesco store for £0.60 (equivalent to £0.68 in 2025) with an expected shelf-life of approximately ten days, and was physically hosted in the home of Edward Keeble, one of the newspaper's video editors. Within the first five hours of the stream, it had received more than 50,000 likes, and attracted more than 350,000 viewers by the following day.

On 18 October 2022, the Daily Star further ran a headline titled "Lettuce Liz on Leaf Support" (a pun on "life support"). As the livestream continued, a pair of googly eyes and a blonde wig were put on the lettuce, followed by fake feet and hands and glasses. Occasionally, other items were placed near the lettuce such as stuffed toys, food items, and a mug labelled "Keep Calm and Carry On". Before the lettuce had wilted, on 20 October Truss announced her resignation as prime minister becoming, after only 45 days, the shortest-serving prime minister in British history. At that moment, there were 12,000 viewers on the livestream, which soon shot up to 21,000. The British national anthem "God Save the King" began to play, the portrait of Truss on the table was flipped face down, and a plastic golden crown was placed on top of the lettuce, with the Daily Star declaring the lettuce's "victory" over Truss. The music was later changed to "Celebration" by American band Kool & the Gang, with a Greggs sausage roll and a glass of prosecco also featured. While the lettuce had not rotted entirely, it did show signs of discolouration, with a column in The Atlantic commenting that it was still usable in a salad. By the evening of Truss' resignation, the livestream had received more than 1.7 million viewers. The Daily Star projected an image of the lettuce onto the Palace of Westminster the same evening, followed by a tweet stating that the lettuce "has made it to parliament".

In October 2024, the branch of Tesco at which the lettuce was bought, on Forest Road, Walthamstow, was memorialised with a temporary mock blue plaque stating "A LETTUCE purchased here in September 2022 lasted longer than Prime Minister Liz Truss (49 days)".

The lettuce video was archived at the British Film Institute in October 2025 for digital preservation.

== Reactions ==
=== Prior to Truss' resignation ===
"For now, Truss romaines in place."

— Mothership.SG

The comparison of Truss to the lettuce was received with humour by global media, with The Washington Post writing that Truss had become "the butt of quintessentially British jokes". The lettuce also became subject to betting, with bookmakers who had been previously contacted by Daily Star staff placing Truss' chances of survival past the lettuce as low; on 17 October, a £9 bet at Ladbrokes of the lettuce lasting longer would yield a £13 payout.

=== Post-resignation ===
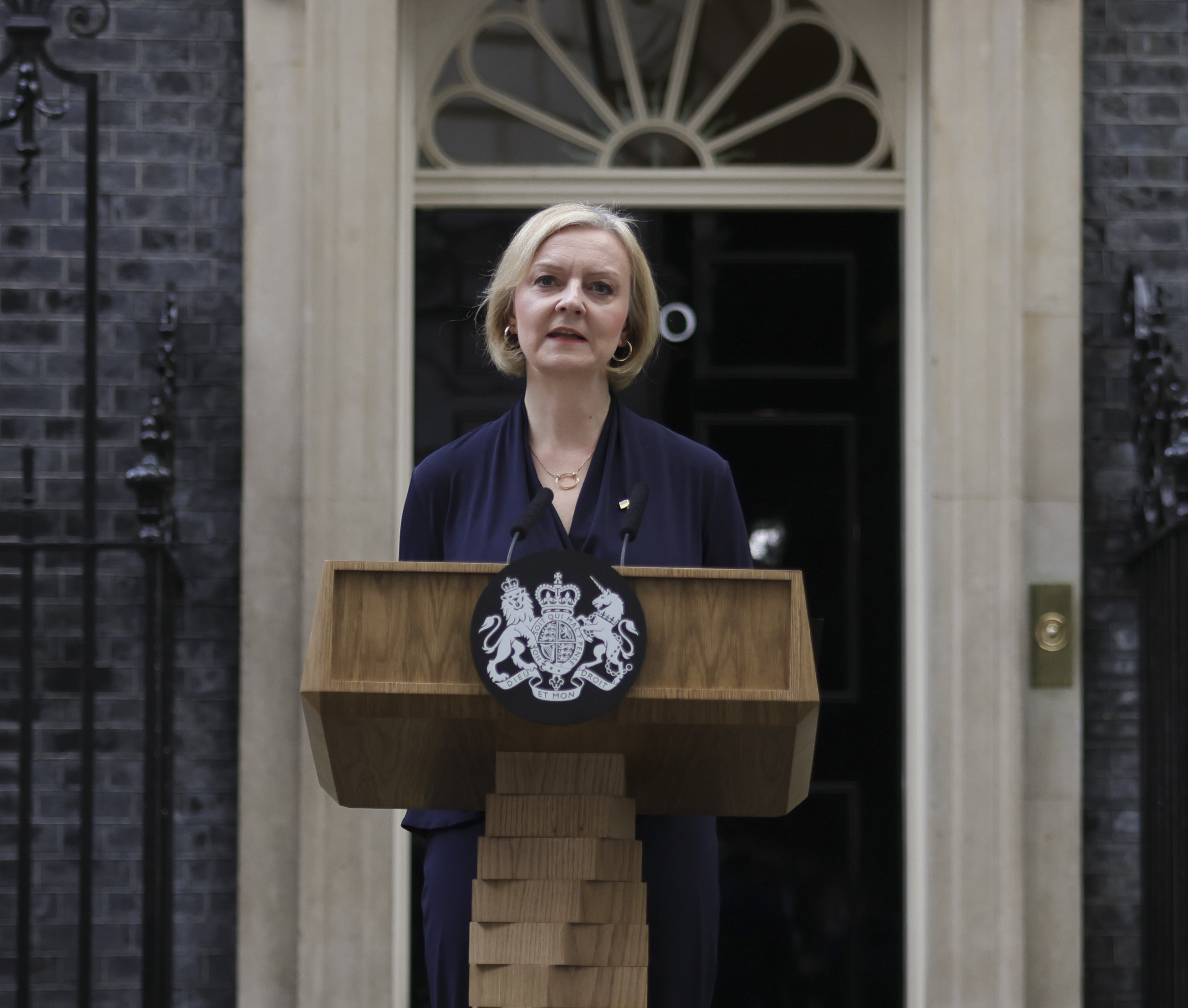
Truss announcing her resignation on 20 October 2022

Following Truss' resignation on 20 October 2022, the Daily Star released a headline titled "Lettuce wins as Liz Leafs", and on 21 October published a "historic souvenir edition" headlined "Lettuce rejoice" (a pun on "let us rejoice"). Bookmaker Paddy Power offered odds of 500-to-1 that the lettuce would become the next prime minister. The Daily Star featured the lettuce on Cameo, allowing users to receive a personalised message "by the lettuce" for £13, with part of the proceeds going to charity.

Labour Party MP Chris Bryant remarked during an appearance at Sky News that "the lettuce might as well be running the country", a statement echoed by The Atlantic journalist Helen Lewis. Former Russian President Dmitry Medvedev posted a tongue-in-cheek tweet congratulating the lettuce after Truss resigned. Several corporations such as Lidl and Deliveroo posted lettuce-related jokes capitalising on the livestream. In Truss' successor Rishi Sunak's first Prime Minister's Questions (PMQ), then Leader of the Opposition Sir Keir Starmer stated that Sunak lost the first leadership contest to Truss, who herself was "beaten by a lettuce".

Clark, the paper's editor, remarked in an interview that the staff at the Daily Star "have no plans to eat Lizzy Lettuce".

The Edenbridge Bonfire Society burnt an effigy of Truss and a laughing lettuce on a bonfire on Guy Fawkes Night, 2022. The 11-metre (36 ft) high effigy held a box with a copy of the Guinness Book of Records, referencing her record as the shortest-serving prime minister. The box also contained a copy of her mini-budget, a T-shirt with the slogan "I am a fighter, not a quitter" (referencing Peter Mandelson's quote that was referenced by Truss at her last PMQs), and a £115,000 cheque representing the maximum annual amount that all former prime ministers are entitled to claim under the Public Duty Costs Allowance scheme for expenses incurred performing the public duties associated with being a former prime minister and a leaving card. The box itself had a large letter "U" together with the words "This Way Up" written on it, both upside-down, along with "Oh Dear Oh Dear Oh Dear Packaging Ltd", referencing the greeting of Truss by Charles III at one of her royal audiences.

On 9 November 2022, during PMQs, a Labour backbench MP shouted "bring the lettuce back!" On 15 March 2023, Starmer said "The lettuces may be out, but the turnips are in" in response to the 2023 budget, referring to the environment secretary Thérèse Coffey's claims the previous month that a "lot of people would be eating turnips right now".

On 10 October 2023, during the Labour Party Conference, Starmer referenced the lettuce again saying "I never thought I'd say this but I'm beginning to see why Liz Truss won. Although I still think we'd be better off with that lettuce."

=== Truss' response ===
On 19 June 2023, Truss broke her silence and spoke about the lettuce for the first time during a visit to Northern Ireland. In an interview with RTÉ journalist David McCullagh, she said: "I don't think it's funny, I just think it's puerile". Truss doubled down on these comments in an April 2024 interview with BBC journalist Chris Mason, calling it "pathetic point-scoring" and remarking that the lettuce phenomenon "is the kind of thing that obsesses what I describe as the London elite".

On 13 August 2024, Truss left the stage while promoting her memoirs in Beccles, Suffolk, after the campaign group Led By Donkeys unfurled a remote control banner as she was taking questions from the audience. The banner pictured a lettuce along with the words "I crashed the economy". Truss walked off the stage and would later describe the stunt as "not funny".

== Similar actions ==
On 14 October, the Channel 5 presenter Jeremy Vine began a similar livestream of a lettuce being compared to Truss' tenure.

Brands including easyJet and Sekonda ran advertising campaigns making fun of Truss' tenure.

On 14 November, following the audience of the ITV celebrity reality show I'm a Celebrity...Get Me Out of Here! choosing the contestant and MP Matt Hancock to be the camp leader, the series' presenters Ant & Dec introduced a lettuce called Spud, again asking which would last longer.

During the January 2023 Speaker of the United States House of Representatives election, the Lincoln Project made a tweet referencing the Liz Truss lettuce to mock Kevin McCarthy, who had failed to secure enough votes to win the Speakership; he later won, but was removed in October of that year.

During the 2024 Scottish government crisis, on 26 April, GB News presenters Tom Harwood and Emily Carver unveiled 'Humza Yousleaf' live on their show Good Afternoon Britain; the lettuce was decorated with a paper beard and googly eyes to resemble the then-Scottish First Minister Humza Yousaf. At the news of Yousaf's resignation days later, Harwood remarked that the lettuce was "still going strong. Lettuce 1, Yousaf 0."

The lettuce inspired a student at the University of York in their protest against the foundation of a Reform Society. They chose to use a raw gammon steak, in reference to the perceived racially stereotypical Reform Party voter. They hoped that the Students' Union would deratify the society due to concerns of the nature of the Reform Party's policies, which the society aligned with. Ultimately the society outlived the steak, which became so rotten that the student's housemates reported the smell to college authorities.

== See also ==
- Out of the Blue, a biography of Truss that had to be rewritten because she resigned before its publication.
- Plant epithet, a name used to label a person or group by association with some perceived quality of a plant.
- Glass cliff, a phenomenon where women are promoted to positions of responsibility when organisations are in difficulty.
