= Matthew Sinclair (political adviser) =

British economist

- Occupation: Political consultant
- Known for: Chief economic adviser to Liz Truss

Matthew Sinclair is a British political consultant. He was the chief economist to Liz Truss when she was Prime Minister.

== Career ==
Sinclair is a former employee of the Institute of Economic Affairs. Sinclair was a director of Deloitte and a former chief executive of the TaxPayers’ Alliance think tank. He was chief economic adviser to the Truss ministry. He ran the No 10 economic unit. Sinclair was an important figure in her economic agenda of cutting taxes. He reportedly supported scrapping HS2 and the Equality and Human Rights Commission. He also supported a reduction in the number of government departments and the abolishment of the Green Investment Bank. With the resignation of Liz Truss, Sinclair left government. In 2023, he was appointed director of the UK branch of the Computer & Communications Industry Association.

Sinclair has been described as a "philosophically-committed right-winger".
