= Opposition day =

Westminster system debate convention

An opposition day is a day in a legislature using the Westminster system in which an opposition party sets the agenda. Most days the parliamentary agenda is set by the government; opposition days allow the smaller parties to choose the subject for debate. The number of days varies between parliaments.

Originally, opposition days were associated with debates over supply and held prior to the estimates and the budget and were created so that opposition parties could advance ideas for what should and should not be funded. In modern politics, opposition days are most often used to bring up issues that the government would rather ignore. Typically, governments seek to amend opposition day motions to support their own policy.

Although not using the Westminster system, France has a similar opposition day system, allowing opposition groups to introduce and force votes on bills they present, rather than just motions.

== Westminster system ==
=== In the United Kingdom ===
In the United Kingdom there are twenty opposition days per parliamentary session. The Official Opposition (since 2024 the Conservative Party) is allocated 17 opposition days, and the other opposition parties given 3 days. The outcomes of votes on opposition day motions are not considered legally binding, although they do represent the will of Parliament.

On 29 April 2009, Gordon Brown's government was defeated in an opposition day vote on the subject of settlement rights for veterans of the Gurkhas. This was the first time since January 1978 that a British government had lost an opposition day vote.

Theresa May's government, being a fragile minority government, refused to amend the motions or divide the house, meaning that all opposition day motions during this period were passed with no vote. This led the Scottish National Party (SNP) MP Pete Wishart to accuse the Government of "degrading [them] to little more than adjournment debates".

Following the 2019 general election, in which Boris Johnson's government won a landslide majority of 80 seats, the practice of the government attending and voting on opposition day motions temporarily resumed. However, following a campaign by footballer Marcus Rashford, the government whipped its MPs to vote against a Labour motion calling on the government to continue funding free school meals for children over the school holidays until Easter 2021, which the Opposition claimed would prevent over 1 million children going hungry during the COVID-19 pandemic, after which there was a strong public backlash, with many new-intake Conservative MPs receiving online abuse and threats. Following this the government resumed Theresa May's practice of ignoring opposition day motions, although Labour have forced the motions to go to a division by having a small number of MPs verbally vote against their own motion (only to vote for the motion in the division) – the government abstains in these divisions.

To counter this, starting from 2022, the Opposition has sometimes proposed, instead of symbolic motions, programme orders, which, if carried, bind the House to consider and hold a vote on a specific bill, under the rules and timetable set in the order itself. The Government cannot ignore a vote on such motions, because doing so would allow a bill it opposes to be brought to the floor (taking time away from proposals the Government supports) and perhaps even pass.

A vote during an opposition day for the second largest opposition party (the SNP) on 21 February 2024 provoked controversy when the Speaker deviated from precedent in the choice of amendments to be taken, leading to a political row.

=== In other countries ===
In Canada there are twenty-two opposition days per parliamentary session. The days are divided among opposition parties with the Official Opposition allotted the most. Canadian opposition parties are allocated days, which are also called "allotted" or "supply" days, in proportion to their membership in the House.

There are no opposition days in Australian jurisdictions. In India, the Parliament does not have an opposition day, but one day every week (Friday) during a session is devoted to private members' bills and resolutions.

== In France ==
In France, one day per month is used in both houses of the French Parliament by a parliamentary group to present bills. This day is known as a niche parlementaire in French; the days are used on a rotating basis between groups. This has existed since the 2008 constitutional reform.
