= Political positions of Liz Truss =

Political positions of British politician

Liz Truss is a British politician who served as Prime Minister of the United Kingdom and Leader of the Conservative Party from September to October 2022. The shortest-serving prime minister in the history of the United Kingdom, she has received attention for her political positions, most notably on economics.

Truss is known for her economically liberal views and her support for free trade. She supports the neoliberal philosophy of supply-side economics, often referred to derogatorily as "trickle-down economics". She founded the Free Enterprise Group of Conservative MPs, a pro-free market collection of parliamentarians arguing for a more entrepreneurial economy and fewer employment laws.

== Economics ==
Trussonomics (a portmanteau of "Truss" and "economics") are the neoliberal economic policies advocated by Liz Truss and the Free Enterprise Group, a group of Thatcherite-leaning Conservative Party MPs founded by Truss in mid-2011. The policies are based upon the principle of reducing the overall tax burden, as part of a model intended to create a high-growth, free-market economy.

The policies of Trussonomics involve extensive tax cuts in addition to reducing government regulation and repealing employment laws in order to attract businesses, encourage entrepreneurship, and grow the economy. Proponents of Trussonomics argue that lower taxes would pay for themselves by encouraging economic growth, a theory known as supply-side economics or trickle-down economics. The tax cuts proposed in the Truss–Kwarteng mini-budget were therefore to be funded by borrowing. The proponents' expectations were that, kick-started by a temporary scheme of lending, tax revenue would eventually increase due to growth in the economy, relieving the need for amassing debt from the tax-cutting measures. Trussonomics was influenced by the economic policies of Ronald Reagan, known as Reaganomics, and of Nigel Lawson, the second Chancellor of the Exchequer under Margaret Thatcher.

These policies were implemented during the premiership of Liz Truss through the September 2022 United Kingdom mini-budget introduced by the Chancellor of the Exchequer Kwasi Kwarteng, which aimed to counter a downturn in the economy of the United Kingdom and the cost of living crisis caused by factors including the COVID-19 pandemic and the Russian invasion of Ukraine earlier that year. The markets reacted badly to the plan, with sterling and government bonds dropping significantly in response to a large increase in government borrowing. The Labour Party, led by Keir Starmer, the International Monetary Fund and US president Joe Biden were among those who criticised the plan, Biden saying "I wasn't the only one who thought it was a mistake". Although Truss tried to push through her agenda in full, she and Kwarteng ended up repealing many policies. On Friday, 14 October 2022, Truss dismissed Kwarteng after 38 days in office, replacing him with Jeremy Hunt. This led Faisal Islam of the BBC to write that Trussonomics was "effectively dead".

Truss's policies were hailed by proponents of supply-side economics, who blamed the financial markets for its failure in practice. Other voices have criticised the ideas from the outset, as well as subsequently.

== Foreign policy ==
Truss was described as a hawkish foreign secretary. She has called for Britain to reduce economic dependency on China and Russia and has supported certain diplomatic and economic sanctions imposed by the British government against China, including barring the Chinese ambassador to the UK Zheng Zeguang from entering Parliament, in response to China's retaliatory sanctions due to Xinjiang. She accused Rishi Sunak of "seeking closer economic relations" with China. Truss has been a strong supporter of Taiwan in the context of deteriorating cross strait relations, but, citing precedent, has said she would not visit the island nation if she was elected prime minister. She described the Chinese government's treatment of the Uyghur people as "genocide".

She stated that the UK and Turkey are "key European NATO allies" and called for UK–Turkey cooperation on "energy, defence and security" to be deepened. Truss said she would continue to support Cyprus in its "efforts for reunification under international law and in helping find a peaceful and lasting solution" to the Cyprus conflict between Greek Cypriots and Turkish-backed Turkish Cypriot separatists.

In 2022 she called Saudi Arabia an "ally", but said she was not "condoning" the country's policies. Truss promised to "review" moving the British embassy in Israel from Tel Aviv to Jerusalem.

== Brexit ==
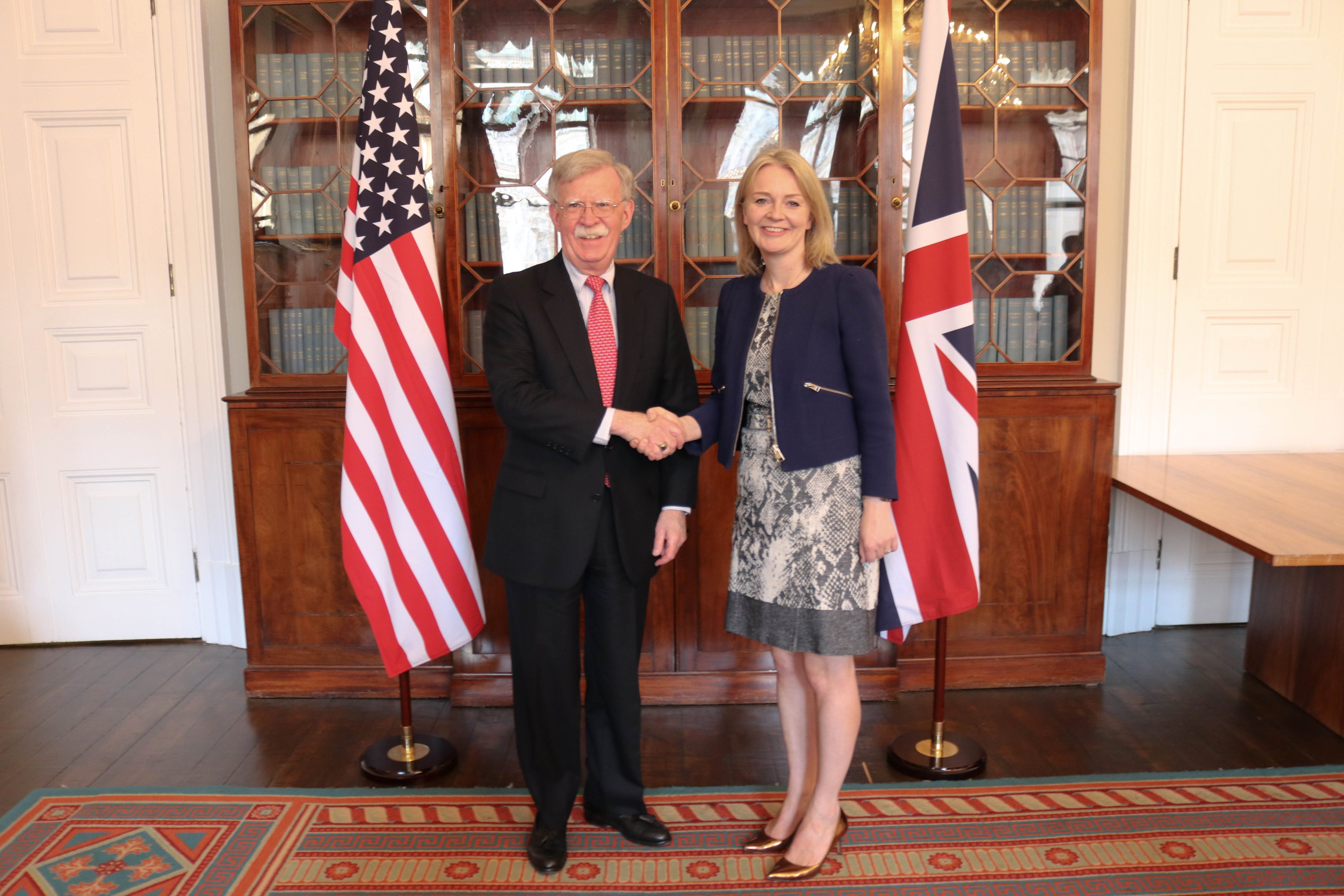
Truss and US National Security Advisor John Bolton in 2019

Truss supported the United Kingdom's remaining in the European Union during the 2016 referendum.

Since the referendum, Truss has supported Brexit; in 2017, she said that if another referendum were held, she would vote for Brexit, saying: "I believed there would be massive economic problems but those haven't come to pass and I've also seen the opportunities." In the July 2022 Conservative Party leadership election, Truss said of her support for Remain that "I was wrong and I am prepared to admit I was wrong". She added that "some of the portents of doom didn't happen and instead we have actually unleashed new opportunities" after Brexit. Her support of Brexit during these debates made her popular with the Conservative party members who selected her as prime minister during this leadership election.

== Social and cultural issues ==
On culture, Truss has said that the Conservative Party should "reject the zero-sum game of identity politics, we reject the illiberalism of cancel culture, and we reject the soft bigotry of low expectations that holds so many people back". She has also suggested that Britain should not ignore the history of the British Empire, but should embrace the country's history "warts and all" if it is to compete with hostile states. In 2021, Truss voted to decriminalise abortion in Northern Ireland and abstained from voting on the introduction of "buffer zones" outside of abortion clinics.

On LGBTQ+ rights, Truss, according to Reuters, voted for gay marriage and has never voted against LGBTQ+ rights, but has also moved to limit transgender rights. She spoke against gender self-identification, stating that "medical checks are important". She said that she agreed that "only women have a cervix". She also stated that the government departments should withdraw from Stonewall's diversity champions scheme. Despite initially supporting single-sex services being restricted on the basis of biological sex, she later said in February 2022 that the Government was not interested in enacting such a measure.

The Truss government planned to increase immigration.

Truss formed the most diverse Cabinet in history with no white males in positions in the Great Offices of State.

== Energy and environment ==
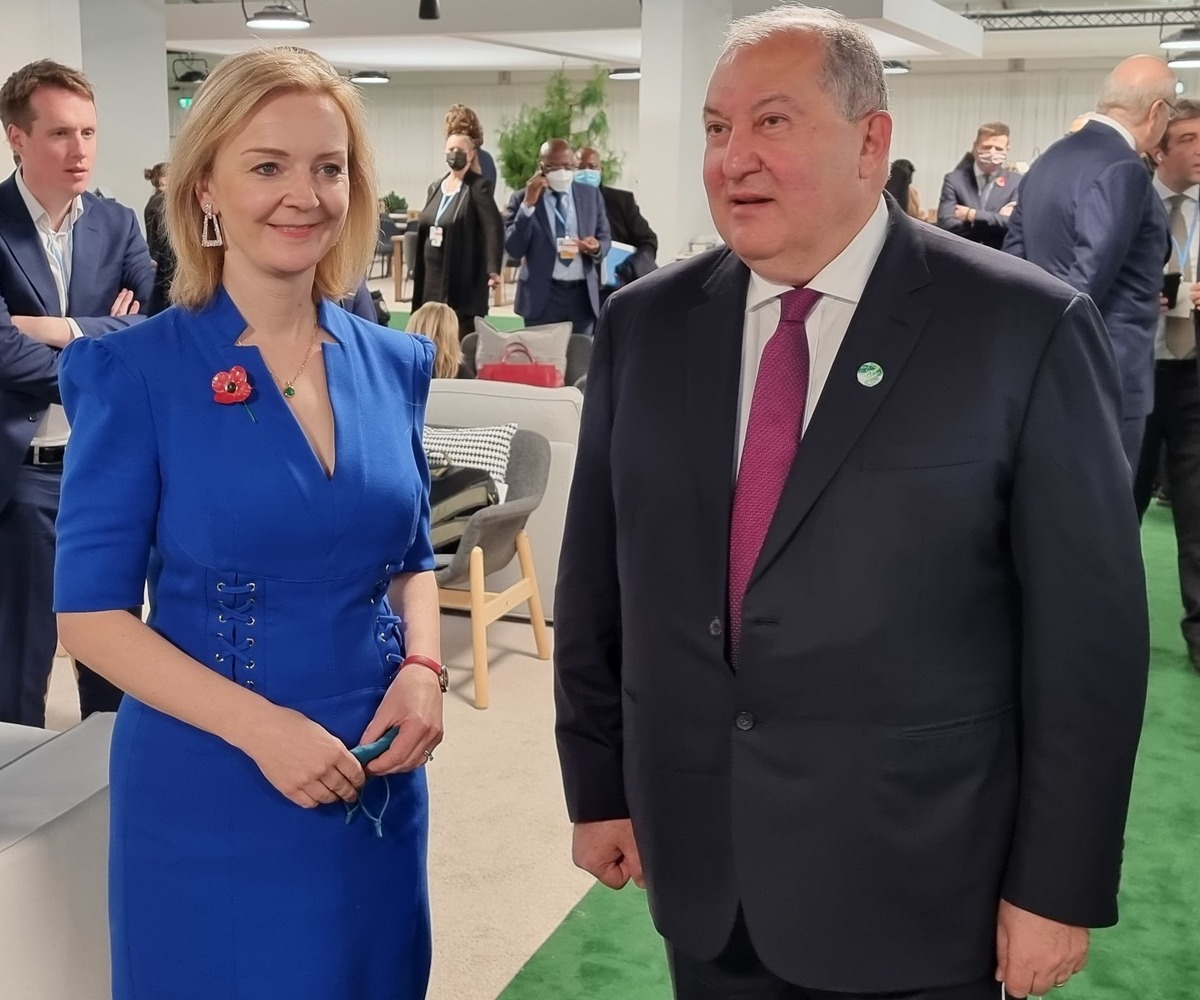
Truss and Armenian President Armen Sarkissian at the 2021 United Nations Climate Change Conference in Glasgow, 2021

As environment secretary, Truss supported a new strategy on bees and other pollinators, and advocated for gardeners to reduce lawnmower use to reduce impacts on them (see Environment Secretary section for more details).

Truss signed the Conservative Environment Pledge on the website of the Conservative Environment Network (CEN), which has the support of 127 Conservative MPs. By signing the CEN pledge, Truss committed to achieving the UK's net-zero target on reducing greenhouse gas emissions by 2050 and in 2022, said that she wanted to do this "in a way that doesn't harm businesses or consumers". As part of the energy crisis measures, a temporary suspension of green levies on domestic bills starting on 1 October was announced by the Government, with schemes previously funded by the levies now being funded by government.

As reported in The Daily Telegraph, Truss planned to scrap an environmental rule called the "nutrient neutrality" requirement. This rule requires details from the developers about how their proposals might pollute rivers and wetlands and is implemented by the non-departmental public body Natural England. UK Government support for nutrient neutrality is outlined in a policy paper from March 2022 "Nutrient pollution: reducing the impact on protected sites".

As part of a two-year plan to ensure British energy security, Truss's government issued the 33rd round of offshore licences on 7 October 2022 (the first since 2019–2020) with as many as 100 set to be awarded. Nearly 900 locations are being offered for exploration, with a fast-track for parts of the North Sea near existing infrastructure. Opposition has come from Greenpeace, among others, who say that this energy policy benefits fossil-fuel companies and will have little impact on prices.

The ban on fracking for shale gas was lifted in September 2022 as the moratorium in place since 2019 was scrapped. The lifting of the ban has given companies the go-ahead to apply for planning permission to extract shale gas in the U.K. Fracking was banned by the government in November 2019 after a report by the Oil and Gas Authority found that it was not possible at that time to predict the probability or strength of earthquakes caused by fracking.

While PM, Truss was wanting to ban solar farms from about 58% of agricultural land. In October 2022, her spokesperson confirmed that plans to ban solar farming from agricultural land were going ahead. While not against the use of solar panels, in August 2022 Truss said that she thought that it was "one of the most depressing sights" to see fields full of solar panels, instead of being full of crops or livestock. She has proposed that solar panel use should be restricted to commercial roofs.

Truss has supported the construction of small modular reactors and large nuclear power facilities in different parts of the United Kingdom. While foreign secretary, she cautioned against Chinese involvement in British infrastructure, including nuclear power stations.

As outlined in the Government's Hydrogen Strategy and included as part of Truss's energy crisis solutions, building hydrogen production facilities was to be a key part of the UK energy supply. A company has been given the green light to build a 6 Megawatt electrolyser at the Sizewell nuclear power stations site and will involve the Freeport East Hydrogen Hub in Felixstowe/Harwich. Hydrogen production can involve water generation, called "green", or fossil fuel generation, called "grey" and "blue".

A press release from Truss and the FCDO, after the COP26 summit in Glasgow, ended by saying that the UK was committed to supporting green enterprises and would help countries globally to deliver green, sustainable growth and economic development, while a statement by Truss at the end of a G7 foreign and development ministers' meeting in December 2021 outlined a commitment from them to work together to keep to the COP27 target for limiting global warming to 1.5 degrees.

As part of the Growth Plan set out by Government in September 2022, proposals were made to limit the ability of councils in England to block the construction of onshore windfarms, a reversal of policy implemented in 2016 as part of the National Planning Policy Framework. The Government said that it would bring UK planning policy for onshore wind farming in line with existing rules, which could allow infrastructure to be more easily deployed.
