= After the Coalition =

2011 political publication

After the Coalition: A Conservative Agenda for Britain
- Author: Kwasi Kwarteng; Priti Patel; Dominic Raab; Chris Skidmore; Liz Truss
- Language: English
- Publisher: Biteback Publishing
- Publication date: 8 September 2011
- Publication place: United Kingdom
- Media type: Print
- Pages: 256
- ISBN: 978-1849541589

After the Coalition: A Conservative Agenda for Britain is a 2011 book written by five British Conservative MPs at the time: Kwasi Kwarteng, Priti Patel, Dominic Raab, Chris Skidmore, and Liz Truss, all of whom had entered Parliament in the previous year's general election. The book summarises the aforementioned five's thoughts on the Cameron–Clegg coalition of 2010, a plan to reelect the sitting prime minister David Cameron, and a further plan to implement the five's views on modern British conservatism before the end of the coalition in 2015.

== Writing ==
In the days after the book's initial release, four of the five co-authors released opinion statements in The Daily Telegraph on why the British government should implement their policies.

On 12 September 2011, Liz Truss released her statement. According to Truss, her values for modern British conservatism included an emphasis on "restoration of personal responsibility and initiative". She wrote that the amassing of heavy amounts of debt following Gordon Brown's granting of rescue packages to banks in 2008 and 2009, during the 2008 financial crisis, had – together with other policies – put the United Kingdom in need of a modern British conservatism. She stated that there was an opportunity to challenge the British public's complacency about their country's economic decline and that the Conservative Party should focus on holding senior civil servants and business leaders to account; she also suggested other economic policies to lift the United Kingdom out of economic decline.

On 13 September, Kwasi Kwarteng released his statement. He noted that during the European debt crisis the United Kingdom had the worst deficit of all the G20 nations, standing at 11% at the onset of the 2008 financial crisis, and that government spending had increased by 11.3% from 2000 to 2010, from 36.8% to 47.1%. Kwarteng praised the Cameron–Clegg coalition for its economic policies, and called for a major decrease in government spending. He also called for inspiration to be taken from Switzerland's economic amendments for a balanced budget from 2001, saying that the amendments had helped that country after it had suffered a decade of increasing debt and deficits.

On 14 September, Chris Skidmore released his statement. In it he praised the reforms made by members of the Cameron–Clegg coalition. These reforms in Skidmore's opinion had the intended aim of "[taking power] away from the state [and] placing power and responsibility back in the hands of those who know how to use it". Skidmore also wrote that responsibility is a major and key factor for the vision of British conservatism. He wanted the general public to be rewarded for doing the "right thing" and for it to "fight for a better life"; he stated that the future of services such as the National Health Service and Right to Buy were dependent on keeping the British public responsible for their actions.

On 15 September, Dominic Raab released his statement. In it he advocated for a foreign policy that would shed the United Kingdom's "utopian idealism in favour of a more rugged internationalism". He argued for a deal that would target reducing carbon dioxide emissions within the top 20 carbon-emitting countries, for Britain to refocus its priorities in foreign conflicts to reflect its "interests and capabilities", for the strengthening of relations with the Commonwealth, for the United Kingdom to pursue a more relaxed relationship with the United States, and for it to seek a two-speed European Union.

== Reception ==
John Redwood, a Conservative MP for Wokingham in Berkshire, praised the book and the ideals expressed therein in his personal blog John Redwood's Diary; he wrote that the authors had truly been advocates for modern British conservatism, "no Lib Dems in drag or Coalition mongers who fancy another five years of political marriage to another party. They want to help mould the agenda, and want to be part of a majority Conservative government one day". However, he disagreed with the implementation of a carbon tax on the United Kingdom, saying that there were more pressing issues.
