= Liz Truss =

Prime Minister of the United Kingdom in 2022

The Right Honourable Liz Truss
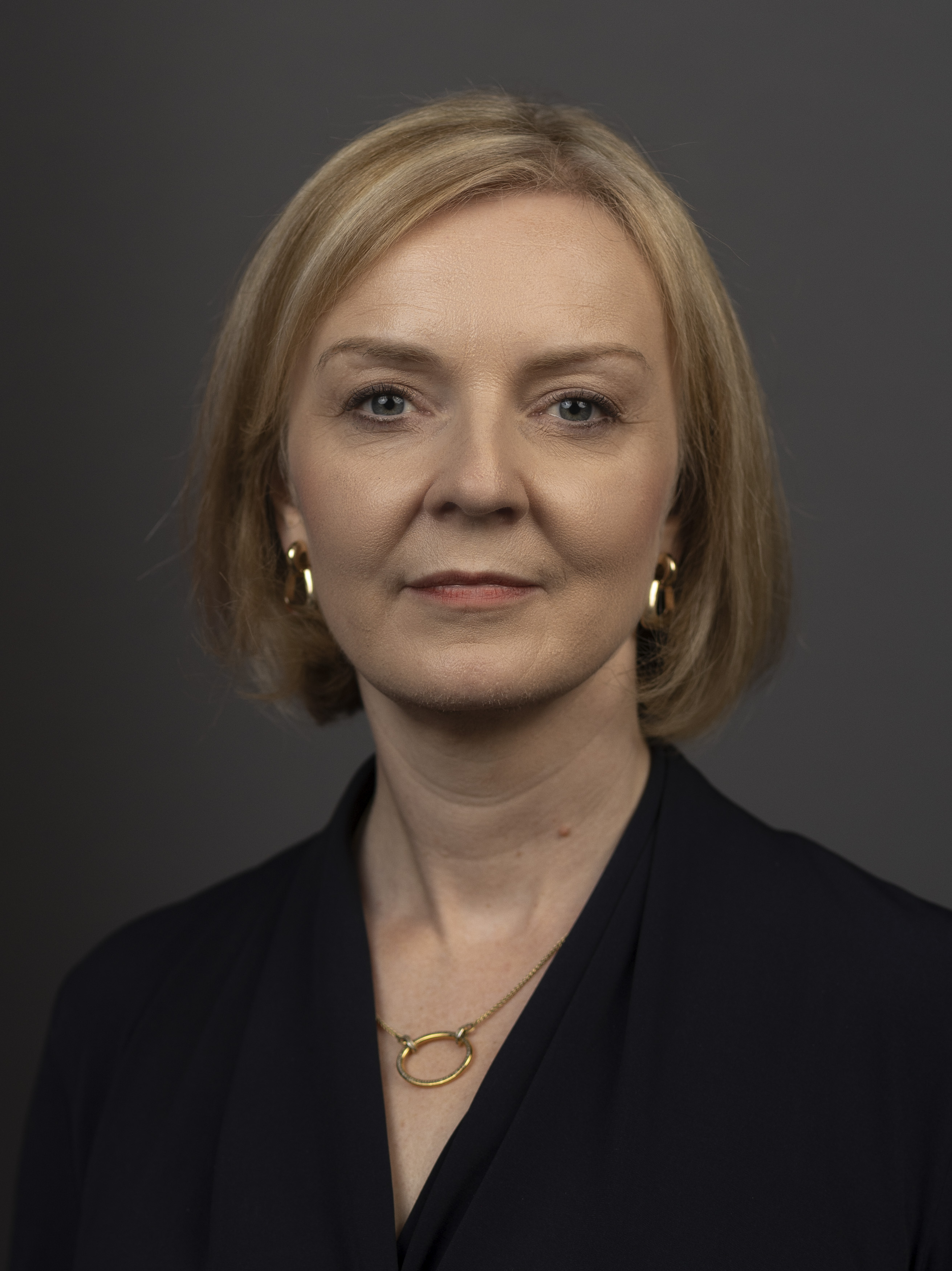
- Official portrait, 2022

Prime Minister of the United Kingdom
- In office 6 September 2022 – 25 October 2022
- Monarchs: Elizabeth II; Charles III
- Preceded by: Boris Johnson
- Succeeded by: Rishi Sunak

Leader of the Conservative Party
- In office 5 September 2022 – 24 October 2022
- Preceded by: Boris Johnson
- Succeeded by: Rishi Sunak
Ministerial offices 2012‍–‍2022
Foreign Secretary
In office 15 September 2021 – 6 September 2022
Prime Minister	Boris Johnson
Preceded by	Dominic Raab
Succeeded by	James Cleverly
Minister for Women and Equalities
In office 10 September 2019 – 6 September 2022
Prime Minister	Boris Johnson
Preceded by	Amber Rudd
Succeeded by	Nadhim Zahawi (Note: As Minister for Equalities.)
Secretary of State for International Trade; President of the Board of Trade
In office 24 July 2019 – 15 September 2021
Prime Minister	Boris Johnson
Preceded by	Liam Fox
Succeeded by	Anne-Marie Trevelyan
Chief Secretary to the Treasury
In office 11 June 2017 – 24 July 2019
Prime Minister	Theresa May
Chancellor	Philip Hammond
Preceded by	David Gauke
Succeeded by	Rishi Sunak
Secretary of State for Justice; Lord Chancellor
In office 14 July 2016 – 11 June 2017
Prime Minister	Theresa May
Preceded by	Michael Gove
Succeeded by	David Lidington
Secretary of State for Environment, Food and Rural Affairs
In office 15 July 2014 – 14 July 2016
Prime Minister	David Cameron
Preceded by	Owen Paterson
Succeeded by	Andrea Leadsom
Parliamentary Under-Secretary of State for Childcare and Education
In office 4 September 2012 – 15 July 2014
Prime Minister	David Cameron
Preceded by	Sarah Teather
Succeeded by	Sam Gyimah

Member of Parliament for South West Norfolk
- In office 6 May 2010 – 30 May 2024
- Preceded by: Christopher Fraser
- Succeeded by: Terry Jermy

Personal details
- Born: Mary Elizabeth Truss; 26 July 1975 (age 51) Oxford, England
- Party: Conservative (since 1996)
- Other political affiliations: Liberal Democrats (until 1996)
- Spouse: Hugh O'Leary (m. 2000)
- Children: 2
- Parent: John Truss (father)
- Education: Merton College, Oxford (BA)
- Website: elizabethtruss.com
- Liz Truss's voice Truss's first speech as prime minister Recorded 6 September 2022

Mary Elizabeth Truss (born 26 July 1975) is a British politician who was Prime Minister of the United Kingdom and Leader of the Conservative Party from September to October 2022. On her fiftieth day in office, she stepped down amid a government crisis, making her the shortest-serving prime minister in British history. The member of Parliament (MP) for South West Norfolk from 2010 to 2024, Truss held various Cabinet positions under three prime ministers – David Cameron, Theresa May and Boris Johnson – lastly as foreign secretary from 2021 to 2022.

Truss studied philosophy, politics and economics at Merton College, Oxford, and was the president of the Oxford University Liberal Democrats. In 1996 she joined the Conservative Party. She worked at Royal Dutch Shell and Cable & Wireless and was the deputy director of the think tank Reform. After two unsuccessful attempts to be elected to the House of Commons, she became the MP for South West Norfolk at the 2010 general election. As a backbencher, she called for reform in several policy areas including the economy, childcare and mathematics in education. Truss co-founded the Free Enterprise Group of Conservative MPs and wrote or co-wrote a number of papers and books, including After the Coalition and Britannia Unchained.

Truss was Parliamentary Under-Secretary of State for Childcare and Education from 2012 to 2014 before Cameron appointed her Secretary of State for Environment, Food and Rural Affairs in a cabinet reshuffle. Although she campaigned for Britain to remain in the European Union, Truss supported Brexit following the outcome of the 2016 referendum. Following Cameron's resignation in 2016 his successor, Theresa May, appointed her Secretary of State for Justice and Lord Chancellor, making Truss the first woman to serve as Lord Chancellor in the office's thousand-year history; in the aftermath of the 2017 general election she was demoted to Chief Secretary to the Treasury. After May announced her resignation in May 2019, Truss supported Johnson's successful bid to become Conservative leader and prime minister. He appointed Truss Secretary of State for International Trade and President of the Board of Trade in July and subsequently to the additional role of Minister for Women and Equalities in September. Johnson promoted Truss to foreign secretary in the 2021 cabinet reshuffle; during her time in the position she led negotiations on the Northern Ireland Protocol and the British response to the Russian invasion of Ukraine.

In September 2022 Truss defeated Rishi Sunak in a leadership election to succeed Johnson, who had resigned because of an earlier government crisis, and was appointed prime minister by Queen Elizabeth II two days before the monarch's death; the government's business was subsequently suspended during a national mourning period of ten days. In response to the rising cost of living and increased energy prices, Truss's ministry announced the Energy Price Guarantee. The government then announced large-scale tax cuts and borrowing in a mini-budget, which led to financial instability and were largely reversed. Facing mounting criticism and loss of confidence in her leadership, Truss announced her resignation as leader of the Conservative Party on 20 October. Sunak was elected unopposed as her successor, and appointed prime minister on 25 October. After spending the duration of Sunak's premiership on the backbenches, Truss lost her seat at the 2024 general election.

== Early life and education (1975–1996) ==
Mary Elizabeth Truss was born on 26 July 1975 at John Radcliffe Hospital in Oxford, England. She was the second child of John and Priscilla Truss (née Grasby); the year before Truss's birth, their first son, Matthew, had died. (Note: John and Priscilla had three children after Truss: Chris (born 1978), Patrick (born 1980) and Francis (born 1983).) Truss was known by her middle name, Elizabeth, from early childhood, with her father – a professor of pure mathematics at the University of Leeds – using it regularly, which she preferred; after being given a badge with "Mary" on it on her first day of school, Truss asked her teacher that it be changed. She later described her parents' politics as being "to the left of Labour"; her mother, a teacher and nurse, was a member of the Campaign for Nuclear Disarmament. When Truss stood for election as a Conservative, her mother agreed to campaign with her but her father declined to do so. Her parents divorced in 2003.

[S]he stands out in my memory as a sort of strange, unfocused force, hugely in favour of action and change ... it was always hard to see the aim of it all, or where it might lead, except that she would be at the centre of it.

— Julian Glover on Truss, his former schoolmate.

In 1977 Truss and her parents moved to Warsaw in Poland, but returned to Britain after John and Priscilla found it "quite grim". After living briefly in Kidderminster, Worcestershire, the family moved to Paisley in Scotland when Truss was four years old, where she attended West Primary School. In 1985 they moved south to Leeds, where Truss attended Roundhay School; she later said in 2022 that at the school she "saw kids ... being let down", a claim which was criticised as inaccurate by several former Roundhay pupils. When Truss was 12 she and her family spent a year in Burnaby, British Columbia, Canada, where she attended Parkcrest Elementary School whilst her father taught at Simon Fraser University. Truss praised the Canadian curriculum and the attitude that it was "really good to be top of the class", which she contrasted with her education at Roundhay.

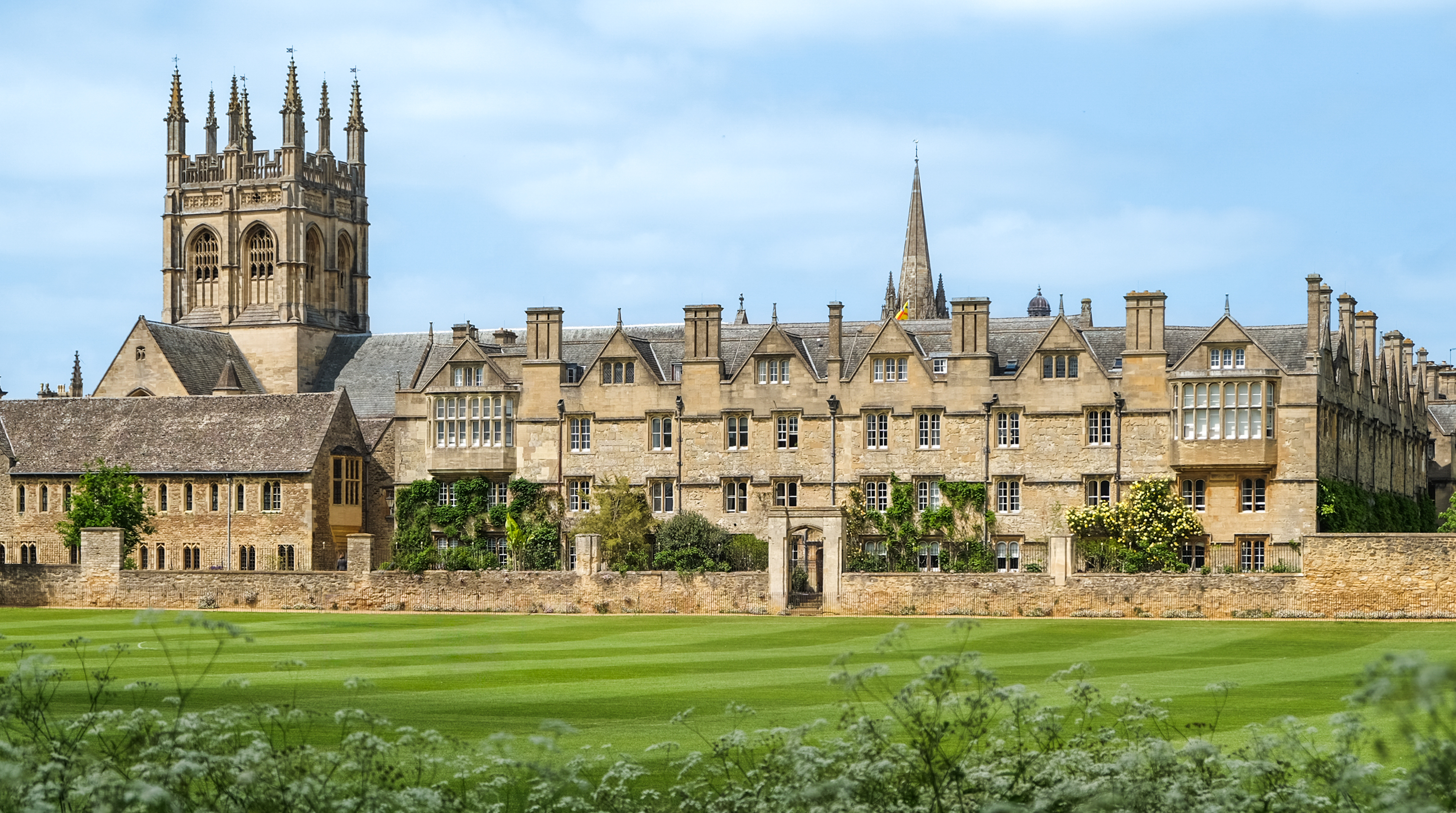
Merton College, Oxford, where Truss studied (pictured in 2023)

Truss's parents had initially wanted her to study at the University of Cambridge, but Truss instead elected to go to Oxford in what her biographers, Cole and Heale, call a "bout of teenage rebellion". She applied to Merton College but was instead pooled to the all-women's St Hilda's College; she then complained to both colleges, after which she was accepted by Merton and began her studies there in September 1993. Truss read philosophy, politics and economics and graduated in 1996. During her time at university, Truss was active in the Liberal Democrats and was a member of the Oxford Reform Club. She became the president of the Oxford University Liberal Democrats in her first year and a member of the national executive committee of Liberal Democrat Youth and Students (LDYS) in 1995. During Truss's previous, unsuccessful, bid for the LDYS executive, the party's leader, Paddy Ashdown, said she was "a good debater and is utterly fearless". As a Liberal Democrat, Truss supported the abolition of the monarchy and the legalisation of cannabis, and campaigned against the Criminal Justice and Public Order Act 1994. However, by November 1995 Truss had become critical of the Liberal Democrats, as she "realised the Tory Party was saying quite sane things"; in her last year at the university, she resigned from the LDYS. By 1996 Truss had joined the Conservative Party.

== Career ==
=== Employment and candidatures (1996–2010) ===
From 1996 to 2000, Truss worked for Royal Dutch Shell, living in Lewisham and Greenwich and qualifying as a chartered management accountant. In 2000 she was employed by Cable & Wireless and rose to the position of economic director before leaving in 2005; one of her colleagues there, the Labour peer George Robertson, said that Truss "had a passion for politics ... she [was] fresh minded, enthusiastic and the Tory Party needed people like that". In January 2008, after losing her first two elections, Truss became the deputy director of Reform, a centre-right think tank, where she advocated for more focus on countering serious and organised crime, higher standards in schools and action to tackle Britain's "falling competitiveness". She co-authored The Value of Mathematics, Fit for Purpose, A New Level, Back To Black and other reports.

Whilst working at Shell, Truss served as the chair of the Lewisham Deptford Conservative Association from 1998 to 2000, having been introduced to the branch by her friend and later Conservative MP Jackie Doyle-Price. Truss unsuccessfully stood for election twice in Greenwich London Borough Council: for Vanbrugh ward in 1998 and Blackheath Westcombe in 2002. The deputy leader of Greenwich Conservatives, Graeme Coombes, recalled in 2022 that Truss "said [in 1998] she was hoping to stand for Parliament ... she was destined for bigger and better things". However, Alex Grant, the candidate who had defeated Truss in 2002, called her "largely invisible during the campaign". In the 2006 council election, Truss was elected for Eltham South, but did not seek re-election to the council in 2010, standing down the day she became an MP.

At the 2001 general election Truss was selected for the safe Labour seat of Hemsworth, West Yorkshire, coming a distant second but achieving a 3.2 per cent swing to the Conservatives, thought impressive by her party colleagues. The election saw the Conservatives make a net gain of one seat, which was considered a disappointment; the party leader, William Hague, subsequently resigned, with Truss supporting the former defence secretary Michael Portillo's unsuccessful leadership campaign.

In January 2005 Sue Catling, the parliamentary candidate for the Calder Valley constituency, was forced to resign by the local Conservative Association because of an affair with the association's chairman. Catling claimed that the members of the party that had opposed her were sexist and said that she was "accused of everything except murder and paedophilia". Truss, who was selected as the candidate for the seat, narrowly lost to the Labour incumbent after an active Conservative campaign which The Yorkshire Post described as "Blitzkrieg". Beginning in 2004, Truss embarked on an 18-month extramarital affair with the Conservative MP Mark Field, which ended shortly after the following year's election.

Following the 2005 general election David Cameron replaced Michael Howard as leader, and Truss was added to the party's A-List, a list of potential Conservative candidates; in October 2009 she was selected for the constituency of South West Norfolk by members of the local Conservative Association, winning over 50 per cent of the vote in the first round of the final against five other candidates, including the future deputy prime minister Thérèse Coffey. Shortly after her selection, some members of the constituency association objected to Truss's selection because of her failure to declare her affair with Field. The Mail on Sunday was the first to report on the affair, and party members claimed to have been misled over Truss's "skeleton in the cupboard". A motion was proposed to terminate Truss's candidature; the proponents of Truss's deselection were branded the "Turnip Taliban" by Conservative Party officials and the press, including by the Mail, a reference to stereotypes about Norfolk being a county of farmers. There was also controversy over the fact that Truss was not from Norfolk, with some in the association asking for a local candidate and saying that she had been "parachuted in". On 16 November, the motion was put to the association: following both sides making their arguments, including what Cole and Heale call an "impassioned" speech from Truss, it was defeated by 132 votes to 37. She bought a 'modest family home' in the constituency at Thetford the year she was elected.

=== Backbencher (2010–2012) ===
Truss was elected as an MP in the 2010 general election, which saw 148 other Conservatives become MPs for the first time; many of what The Independent described as the "golden generation" would later reach high ranks in government. The Conservatives did not reach an overall majority in the House of Commons and entered into a coalition government with the Liberal Democrats, with Cameron becoming prime minister. Following her election to Parliament, Truss campaigned for issues relating to her constituency, including the retention of the Tornado GR4 airbase at RAF Marham in her constituency; the replacement of the old aircraft with around 150 new F-35 strike fighters; the conversion of the A11 west of Thetford into a dual carriageway, which was completed in 2014; and preventing a waste incinerator being built in King's Lynn. Truss co-founded the Free Enterprise Group (FEG) – a grouping of over 30 Thatcherite Conservative MPs – in October 2011; the month prior, she had co-authored After the Coalition with some of the people who would later join the FEG: Priti Patel, Kwasi Kwarteng, Dominic Raab and Chris Skidmore. The book advocated for a number of policies, including a reduction in the top rate of tax to 40 pence per pound and the introduction of a carbon tax to reduce pollution. On the publication, Truss wrote:

Our message must be that the state cannot do everything: while the government can help, it can never fully solve any individual's problems. The NHS (Note: National Health Service) can't keep you healthy if you don't eat or exercise properly. A teacher can't get you the grades if you aren't prepared to work. The job centre can't find you work if you aren't prepared to write a CV.

Another book by the same authors, Britannia Unchained, was published in September 2012. The book attracted controversy for claiming that "the British are among the worst idlers in the world. We work among the lowest hours, we retire early and our productivity is poor". In 2022 Truss stated that the authors had each written a different chapter of the book; Raab had written the chapter which contained that claim. Truss soon became well known amongst members of Parliament in Norfolk for her frequent photo ops but was well respected amongst Conservative MPs, who recognised her as dedicated and hard-working, and by staff as attentive to local issues. Some of Truss's earliest contributions to parliamentary discourse were on the subject of education: she advocated for more rigorous teaching in school subjects, especially mathematics, calling for mathematics lessons to be compulsory for all students until the age of 18 and expressing concern about a perceived overreliance on calculators from primary school pupils. Truss criticised "[giving] media studies the same value as further maths" and suggested in 2011 that students should have to sit GCSEs for "5 traditional academic subjects".

=== Education under-secretary (2012–2014) ===
[Y]ou're a great minister, I loved what you did, but we really couldn't go ahead with this one. You're one of the first ministers I've appointed to do something and you've just done it.

— David Cameron speaking to Truss about her childcare proposal.

In September 2012 Truss was appointed as parliamentary under-secretary of state for education and stepped back from the leadership of the FEG, with Kwarteng taking her place. Truss was pleased with her appointment, and praised Michael Gove, the secretary of state for the department; she also formed a friendly rivalry with the future health secretary Matt Hancock. In January 2013, Truss wrote a white paper – More Great Childcare – in which she proposed increasing the maximum number of children childminders could look after at a time from three to four, as a means of reducing childcare costs. The press, including Conservative-leaning papers like The Daily Telegraph and The Times, were largely hostile to the plan. The former claimed that prices would not fall; the latter claimed that "her appointment signal[led] a rapid deregulation of the sector"; and the Guardian columnist Polly Toynbee challenged Truss to demonstrate how to care for so many children on her own. Following a negative response from trade unions and childminders, Truss met with the deputy prime minister, Nick Clegg, who told her that "some of this is fine" but the maximum childminder increase went "much too far", and advised her to revise the proposal; Truss ignored Clegg and pushed ahead with the plan, angering Clegg, who then blocked the proposals. Truss also announced proposals to reform A-levels by concentrating exams at the end of two-year courses and said that Britain should attempt to "out-educate" countries in Asia.

=== Environment secretary (2014–2016) ===
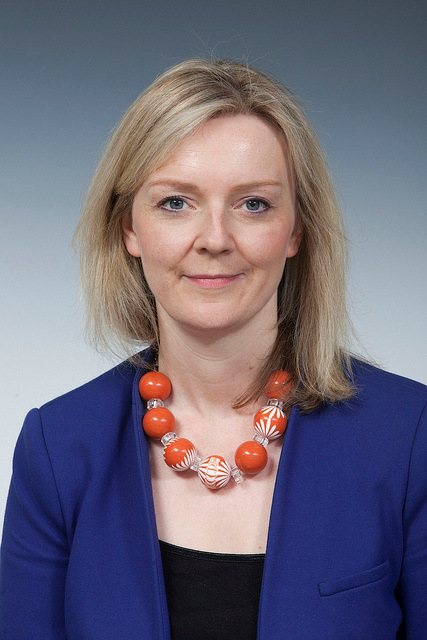
Official portrait, 2014

In July 2014 during a cabinet reshuffle, Truss was appointed secretary of state at the Department of Environment, Food and Rural Affairs (Defra); the changes to the Cabinet made it one third women. She was originally to be made a minister of state, but Cameron changed his mind on the morning of the reshuffle. Her predecessor Owen Paterson "stormed out" of Cameron's Commons study when told he was to be dismissed; nevertheless, he gave Truss his phone number and offered his support. Paterson was dismissed partly because of his culling plans for badgers with tuberculosis, which Truss later supported. Early actions at the department included setting up a "food crime unit" to prevent incidents similar to the 2013 horse meat scandal, approving planning for the Thames Tideway Tunnel and development of Flood Re, a scheme designed to insure homes at a high risk of flooding.

According to the academic Dieter Helm, Truss, having "no obvious interest" in environmental matters, saw Defra instead as "but a first step on a political ladder she wanted to climb up asap". She was, along with the Treasury, keen to cut the budgets of bodies such as Natural England and the Environment Agency, placing them under stricter direct departmental control: Rory Stewart, one of Truss's junior ministers during her second term as environment secretary, claimed that she saw the department "very much in terms of budgets [and] cuts". Under Truss, Defra launched a ten-year strategy to counter falling bee populations, approved the limited temporary lifting of a European Union ban on the use of two neonicotinoid pesticides and cut subsidies for solar panels on agricultural land. Following the 2015 general election Truss was reappointed as environment secretary, although Helm writes that her second period at Defra "saw little change ... do as little as possible was the political objective".

At the Conservative Party conference in September 2014 Truss made a speech in which she said "we import two thirds of our cheese. That is a disgrace" and "in December, I'll be in Beijing, opening up new pork markets". Four days after Truss delivered the speech, parts of the video were featured on the satirical panel show Have I Got News For You; the awkward, stilted delivery led her to be mocked and clips of the speech went viral online. In March the following year Truss was one of two cabinet ministers to vote against the government's proposal to mandate plain packaging for cigarettes. When she had been asked previously about the issue during a constituency meeting, Truss said "when it comes to things like this, I take a more libertarian approach ... I don't know if it's the government's role to regulate this". During the 2016 referendum on leaving the European Union, Truss endorsed Remain, saying that the Conservatives had "a golden chance to reform Britain over the next few years" and to avoid "[spending] that time negotiating Britain's exit from the European Union". The referendum resulted in the defeat of Remain and Cameron's resignation; the home secretary Theresa May won the ensuing leadership election and subsequently became leader of the Conservative Party and prime minister.

=== Justice secretary and lord chancellor (2016–2017) ===
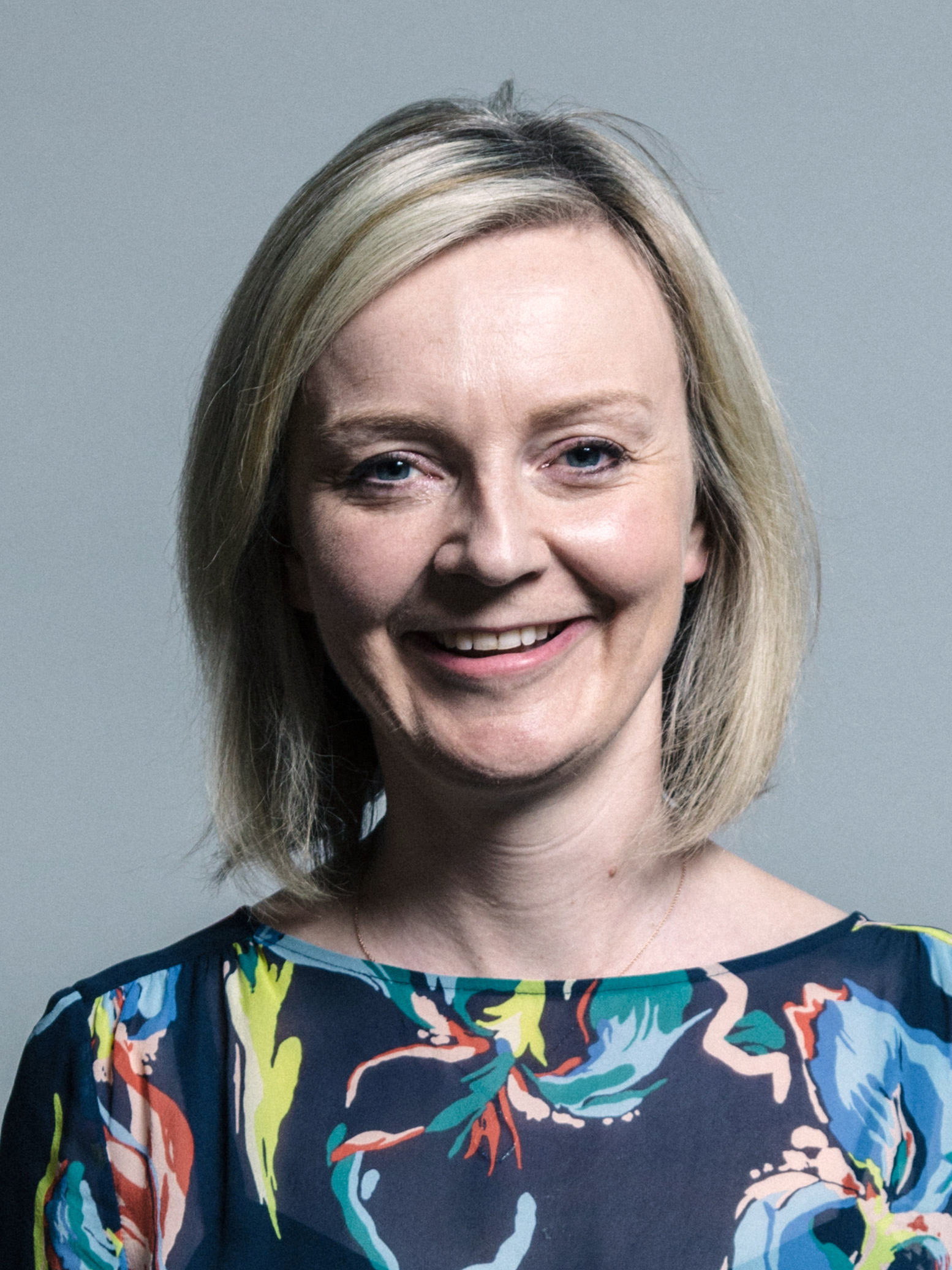
Official portrait, 2017

In July 2016, Truss was appointed as secretary of state for justice and lord chancellor in the first May ministry, becoming the first female lord chancellor in the office's thousand-year history. (Note: Excluding Eleanor of Provence, who exercised the powers of the lord chancellor in 1253 but was not formally appointed to the office.) May's decision to appoint her was criticised by the minister of state for justice, Edward Faulks, who resigned from the government, questioning whether Truss would "have the clout to be able to stand up to the Prime Minister when necessary, on behalf of the judges". Other Conservative members of Parliament criticised Truss's appointment owing to her lack of legal experience; in response, Truss's supporters accused one of the MPs, Bob Neill, of "thinly veiled misogyny".

Before Truss's arrival, the budget of the Ministry of Justice – which is responsible for the administration of British prisons – had been subjected to successive cuts under the coalition government. The cuts were blamed for the prisons' rising rates of violence owing to the consequential drop in prison officer numbers. Truss lobbied the chancellor of the Exchequer, Philip Hammond, for £104 million to hire an additional 2,500 officers, which Hammond reluctantly delivered. In November 2016, Truss was accused of failing to support the judiciary after three judges of the High Court were criticised by politicians and by the Daily Mail – which ran with the headline "Enemies of the People" – for ruling against the government on whether Article 50 – which would begin the process of leaving the EU – could be triggered without Parliament's approval. A former lord chancellor, Charlie Falconer, suggested that, like her immediate predecessors, Truss lacked legal expertise and called for her to be dismissed as justice secretary as her perceived inadequate response "[signalled] to the judges that they have lost their constitutional protector". She denied that she had failed to defend them, writing:

An independent judiciary is the cornerstone of the rule of law, vital to our constitution and freedoms. It is my duty as lord chancellor to defend that independence. I swore to do so under my oath of office. I take that very seriously, and I will always do so.

=== Chief secretary to the Treasury (2017–2019) ===
In June, following the 2017 general election, May demoted Truss from justice secretary to chief secretary to the Treasury, meaning she could attend cabinet meetings but was not a full member; Truss was enraged and called the demotion "incredibly unfair" and was, according to one of her friends, "seething for a good couple of days". Despite what Cole and Heale describe as her "knocked" confidence from the demotion, Truss soon began to contribute to the department, using it, according to a Treasury worker, "like her own personal think tank" by asking for research and advice on monetary policy. In her first few months there, she was largely left out of decision-making processes by Hammond, who was described by Kwarteng as "quite a closed, centrally controlling chancellor"; nevertheless, Truss and the Chancellor were reported to have a good relationship. Beginning in December 2017 she developed an enthusiasm for cultivating her presence on Twitter and Instagram; Truss began to plan ministerial visits around photo ops for her social media. Some of her civil servants were reported as finding her tenure as chief secretary "exhausting", owing to her work schedule and asking them multiplication questions, a tactic she had first employed as an MP. Despite her governmental role, Truss remained relatively unknown by the public, with only seven per cent recognising her in March 2019.

In June 2018, Truss gave a speech criticising rules and regulations which she said "just g[ot] in the way of consumers' choices and lifestyles", including the government's efforts to reduce alcohol consumption and unhealthy eating habits, and warned that raising taxes could see the Conservatives being "crushed" at the polls. She also attacked colleagues who she said should realise "it's not macho just to demand more money", a jibe at the defence secretary Gavin Williamson, who had mounted a largely unsuccessful campaign for an extra £20 billion for his department, including threatening to write "Liz Truss blocked your pay" to everybody in the British Armed Forces. (Note: Williamson had also requested a five per cent rise in troops' pay.) Truss's speech, which also mocked Michael Gove, was criticised by Hammond; Ed Vaizey, an ally of Gove's; and Gove himself; a speech she gave in November similarly joked about Matt Hancock, the newly appointed home secretary, Sajid Javid, and the health secretary, Jeremy Hunt. Before May's resignation announcement on 24 May 2019 Truss had sought the opinion of her colleagues on whether she could credibly stand and courted media attention. As it became apparent she could not win, she ruled herself out the day after May announced her resignation and subsequently endorsed the former foreign secretary Boris Johnson, the first minister to do so.

=== International trade secretary (2019–2021) ===
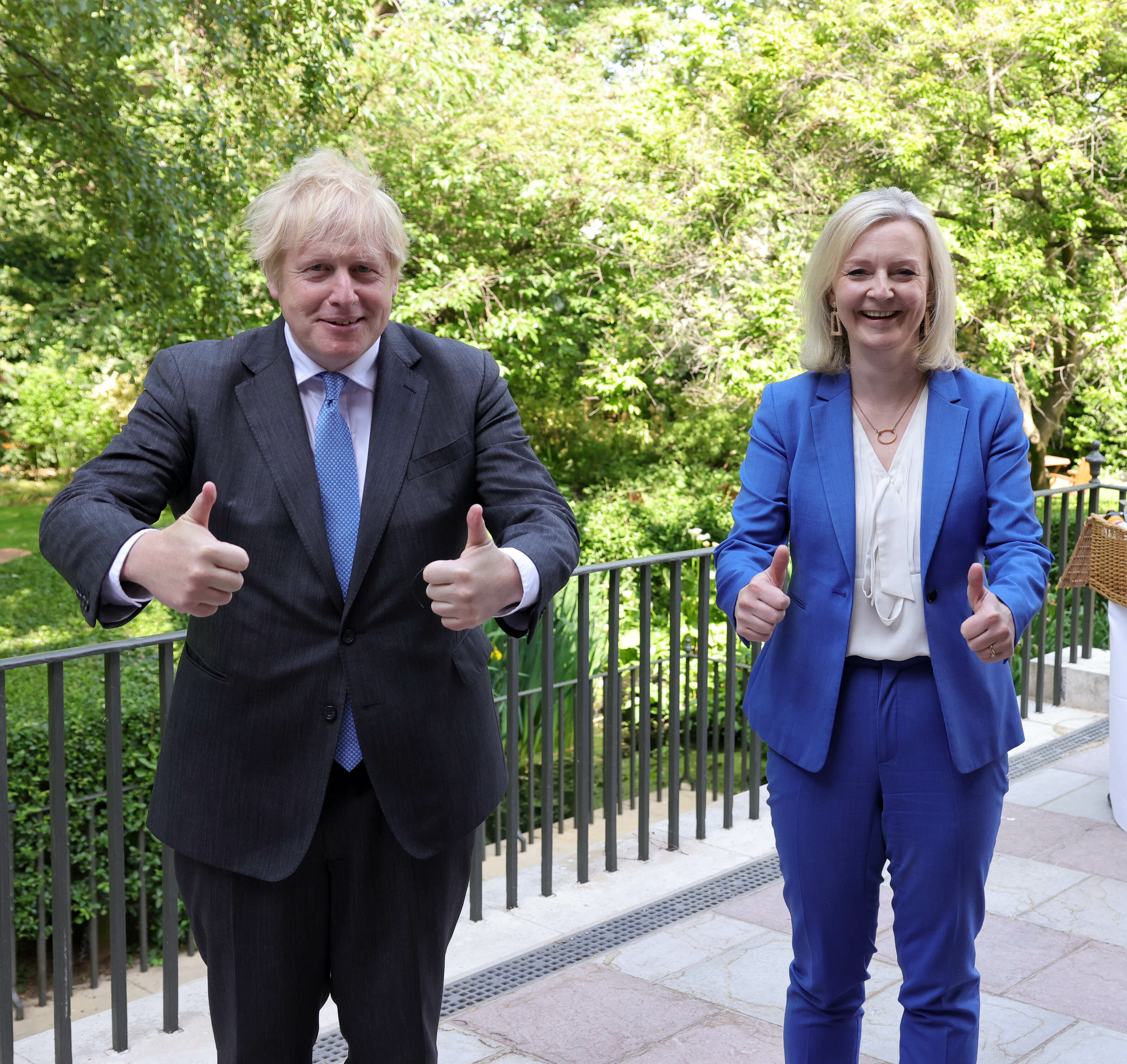
Truss's predecessor Boris Johnson served as leader of the Conservative Party and Prime Minister from 2019 to 2022

After Johnson became prime minister, Truss was widely expected to be promoted because of her endorsement of his leadership campaign; it was thought she might have been appointed chancellor or business secretary, but she was instead promoted to the position of secretary of state for international trade and president of the Board of Trade. Following the resignation of Amber Rudd, Truss was additionally appointed minister for women and equalities in September that year. Shortly after becoming international trade secretary, Truss embarked on international trips to the US, New Zealand, Australia and Japan. Truss met with her American counterpart Robert Lighthizer on her first trip to the US, where she gave what Cole and Heale describe as an "incendiary" speech on a potential US–UK trade deal. In Australia she made unscripted comments on their free-trade negotiations with Britain; both events were to the dismay of Downing Street officials. Sebastian Payne described Truss's tenure as international trade secretary as "enthusiastic yet disruptive". She continued to document her trips through social media.

In February 2020, a reshuffle took place following the general election which had been held in December. Truss feared that she would be dismissed after the comments she had made on her previous international trips, but Johnson decided to keep her in post following Javid's resignation as chancellor. During her time at the department, Truss became notorious for leaking information. Dominic Cummings, Johnson's chief adviser, later wrote that Truss was "the only minister I shouted at in Number 10" because of her "compulsive pathological leaking". Truss's pursuit of a trade deal with the US concerned some in the National Farmers' Union (NFU), which worried about an influx of lower-quality food products if passed; the NFU, along with The Mail on Sunday, campaigned against such a deal in May. The COVID-19 lockdowns eliminated international travel, and Truss instead attended virtual meetings.

By early 2021, Truss's attempted US trade deal was deemed futile. Instead, she focused on joining the Comprehensive and Progressive Agreement for Trans-Pacific Partnership, which necessitated free trade agreements with Australia, Japan and New Zealand. The Australia deal, finalised in December, was described by one of Truss's aides as "the hardest thing she's ever got through"; the New Zealand deal was agreed to shortly thereafter. By mid-2021 she had started to ingratiate herself with the parliamentary party in anticipation of a leadership election. In September plans for a National Insurance increase were opposed by Truss; Downing Street expected her resignation, but Truss later decided against it.

=== Foreign secretary (2021–2022) ===
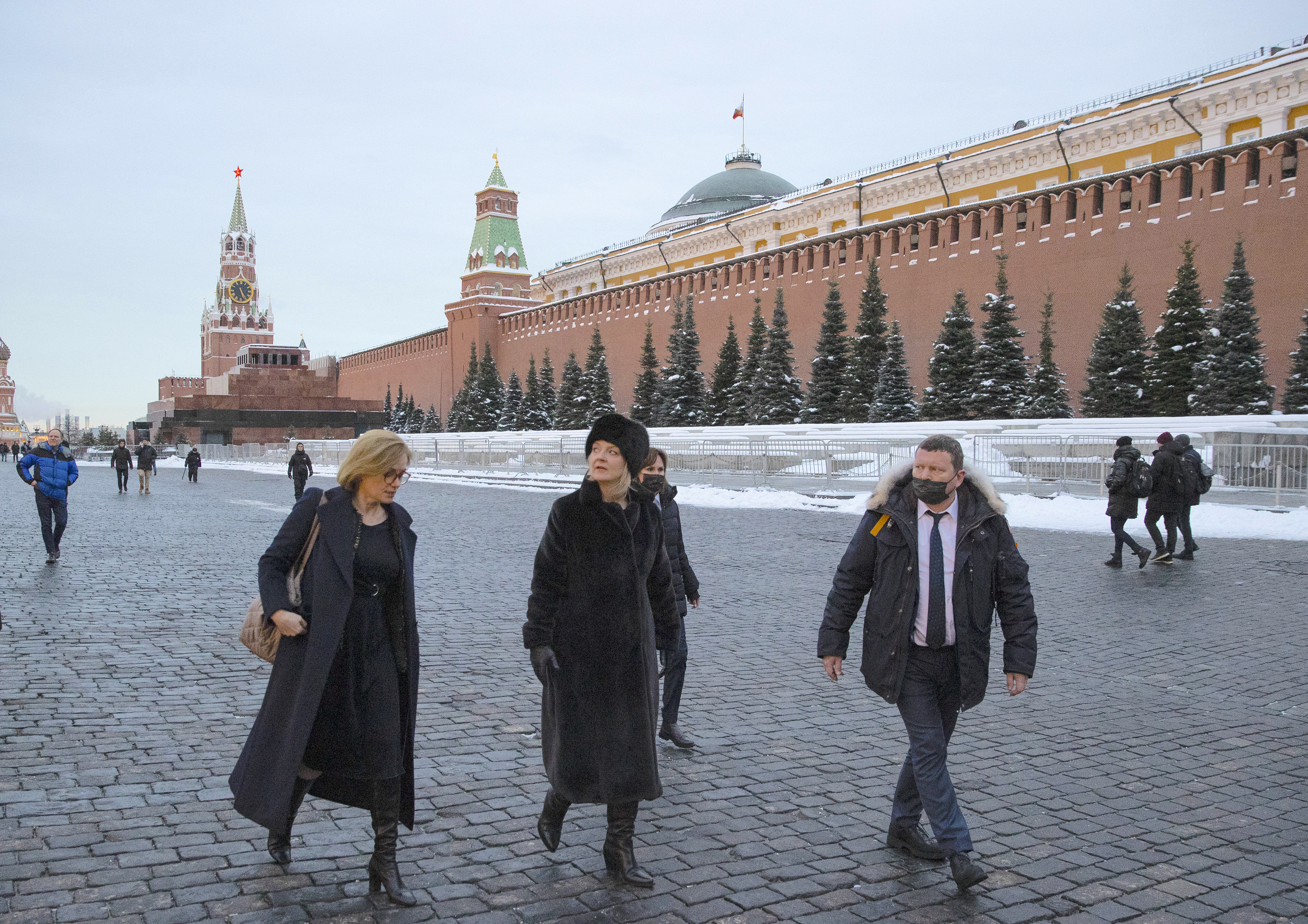
Truss visiting Red Square the day prior to her 2022 meeting with Lavrov

In September 2021, during a cabinet reshuffle, Johnson promoted Truss from international trade secretary to secretary of state for Foreign, Commonwealth and Development affairs, replacing Dominic Raab, who had been criticised for holidaying in Crete during the Fall of Kabul; the move was despite Johnson finding Truss "flaky", according to the historian Anthony Seldon. Truss became the second woman to occupy the office and kept the post of equalities minister. Her early actions as foreign secretary included negotiating at the United Nations General Assembly for the release of Nazanin Zaghari-Ratcliffe; (Note: Truss succeeded in March 2022 and called the release of Zaghari-Ratcliffe and Anoosheh Ashoori the "most privileged moment" of her time in government.) meeting with her Japanese, Canadian and German counterparts; mounting an unsuccessful attempt to join the United States–Mexico–Canada Agreement; and a visit to Estonia where – like Margaret Thatcher in West Germany – she was photographed in a tank, with the pictures generating both praise and mockery.

[W]ho was the person to get the job? Someone who'd been in international trade and travelled around the world for two-and-a-half years. That was a natural promotion.

— Kwasi Kwarteng on Truss's promotion to foreign secretary.

In early 2022, Truss's attention was directed towards a build-up of Russian troops near the Russia–Ukraine border. Truss supported a plan which declassified a large amount of intelligence on Russia, releasing it to the public for the first time to weaken the Russian government in the event of an invasion. On 10 February 2022, she met the Russian foreign minister Sergey Lavrov in Moscow, becoming the first British minister to go on a diplomatic trip there since the 2018 Salisbury poisonings. The meeting was, according to Payne, a "disaster": Lavrov described it as being "between the dumb and the deaf", and the two ministers spoke over each other and found it difficult to communicate. Five days later, Truss stated that the world was on the "brink of war in Europe", which transpired in the early hours of 24 February as Russia invaded Ukraine. Before the invasion and during its immediate aftermath, Truss advocated for sanctions on Russia and encouraged other G7 leaders to impose them; in March 2022, she stated that the sanctions would end only in the event of a "full ceasefire and withdrawal". Johnson praised Truss's actions, saying that "she was always terrific on Ukraine ... other governments faffed around ... she was very clear and focused".

Throughout the first half of 2022, Johnson's position as prime minister became increasingly unstable owing to successive scandals damaging his government and his personal reputation, including Partygate, which resulted in him and the chancellor Rishi Sunak receiving fixed penalty notices. During this time, Truss announced the Northern Ireland Protocol Bill, which was intended to overhaul the Northern Ireland Protocol, including measures to free goods produced in Great Britain from what she described as "unnecessary bureaucracy" entering Northern Ireland. The plan was criticised by the European Commission but was received well by the European Research Group – a Eurosceptic faction within the parliamentary Conservative party – and the right-wing Northern Irish Democratic Unionist Party. Amid mounting pressure on Johnson following the Chris Pincher scandal, on 5 July Sunak and Javid resigned within minutes of each other. Johnson again considered giving Truss the chancellorship, but decided against it owing to what Payne calls the "fragile geopolitical situation" and instead selected Nadhim Zahawi as Sunak's replacement. However, Johnson's premiership proved untenable and on 7 July he announced his resignation as leader of the Conservative Party, a move which Truss called "the right decision".

==== Leadership election (July–September 2022) ====
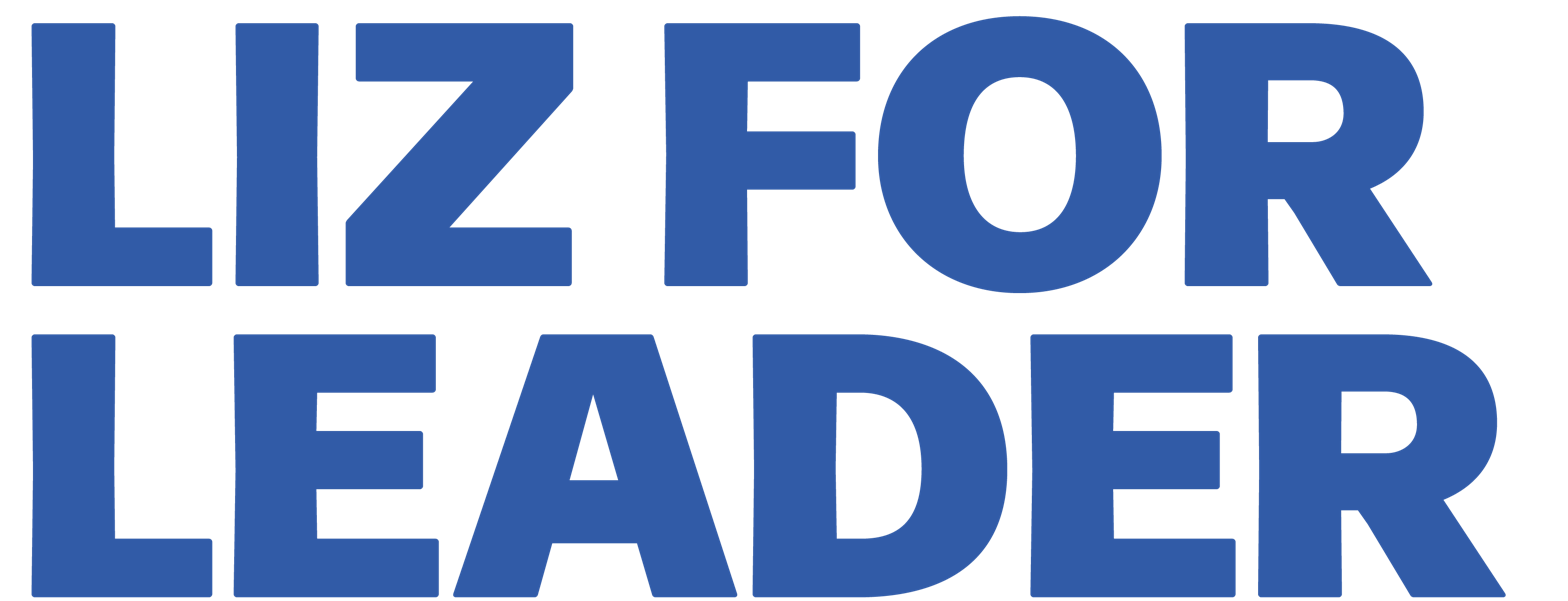
Logo for Truss's leadership bid

On 10 July, Truss announced her intention to run in the leadership election to replace Johnson. She pledged to cut taxes, said she would "fight the election as a Conservative and govern as a Conservative" and would take "immediate action to help people deal with the cost of living". She said she would cancel a planned rise in corporation tax and reverse the increase in National Insurance rates, funded by delaying the date by which the national debt was planned to fall, as part of a "long-term plan to bring down the size of the state and the tax burden". The political scientist Vernon Bogdanor said in a 2022 article that "[Truss] appreciated that winning over the membership required not detailed policy proposals but the creation of a mood".

Truss received 50 votes on the first of Conservative MPs' five ballots, with the number of votes cast for her increasing in each; on 20 July Truss and Sunak were chosen by the parliamentary party to be put forward to the membership for the final leadership vote, with Truss receiving 113 votes to Sunak's 137. In the membership vote, the leader of the 1922 Committee, (Note: The governing body of backbench Conservative members of Parliament.) Graham Brady, announced on 5 September that 43 per cent of ballots were for Sunak and 57 per cent for Truss, making her the new leader. In Truss's victory speech, she said that she would deliver on her campaign promises and pledged to win a "great victory" for the Conservatives at the next general election.

== Premiership (2022) ==
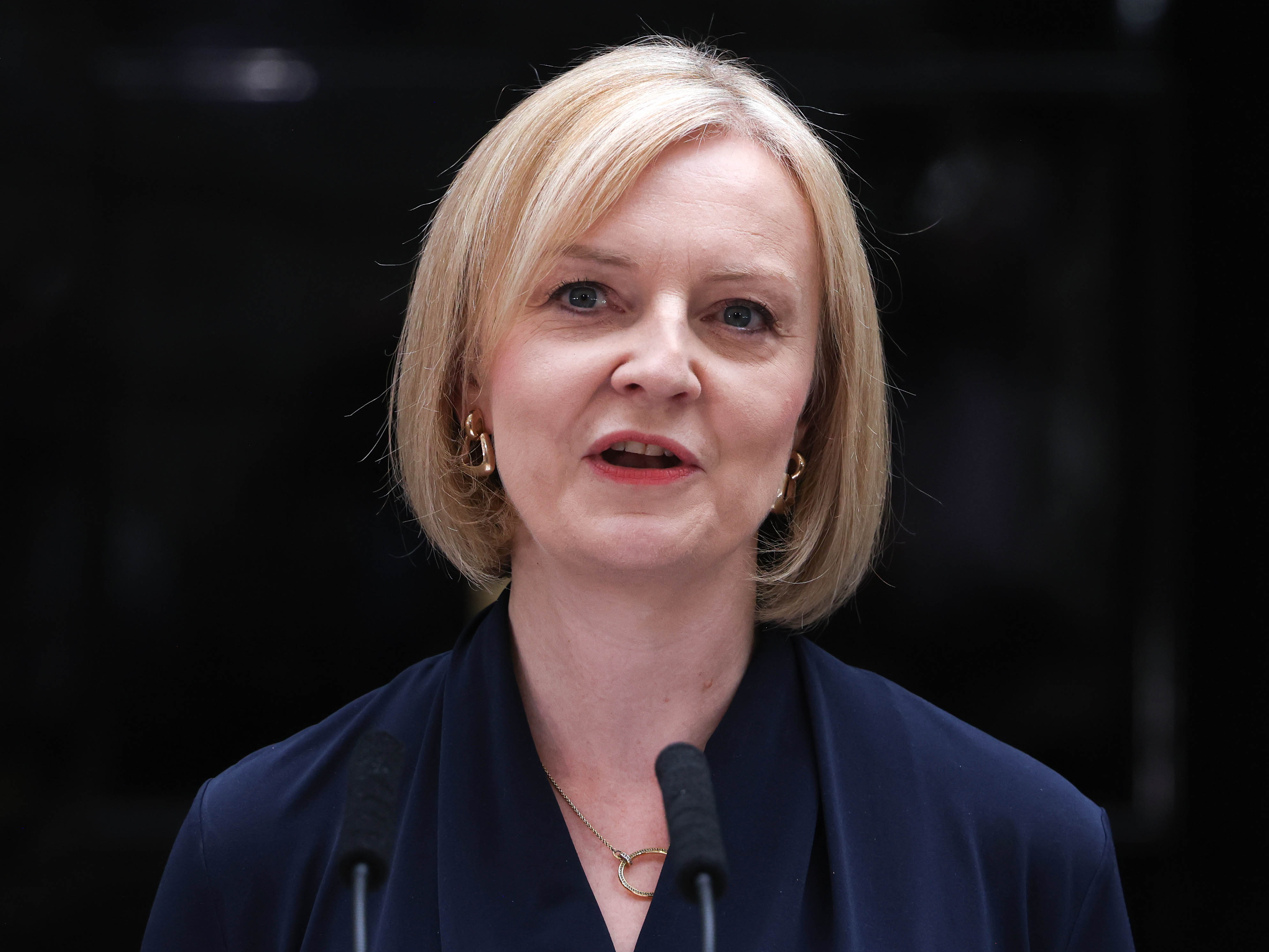
Truss giving her first speech as prime minister on 6 September 2022

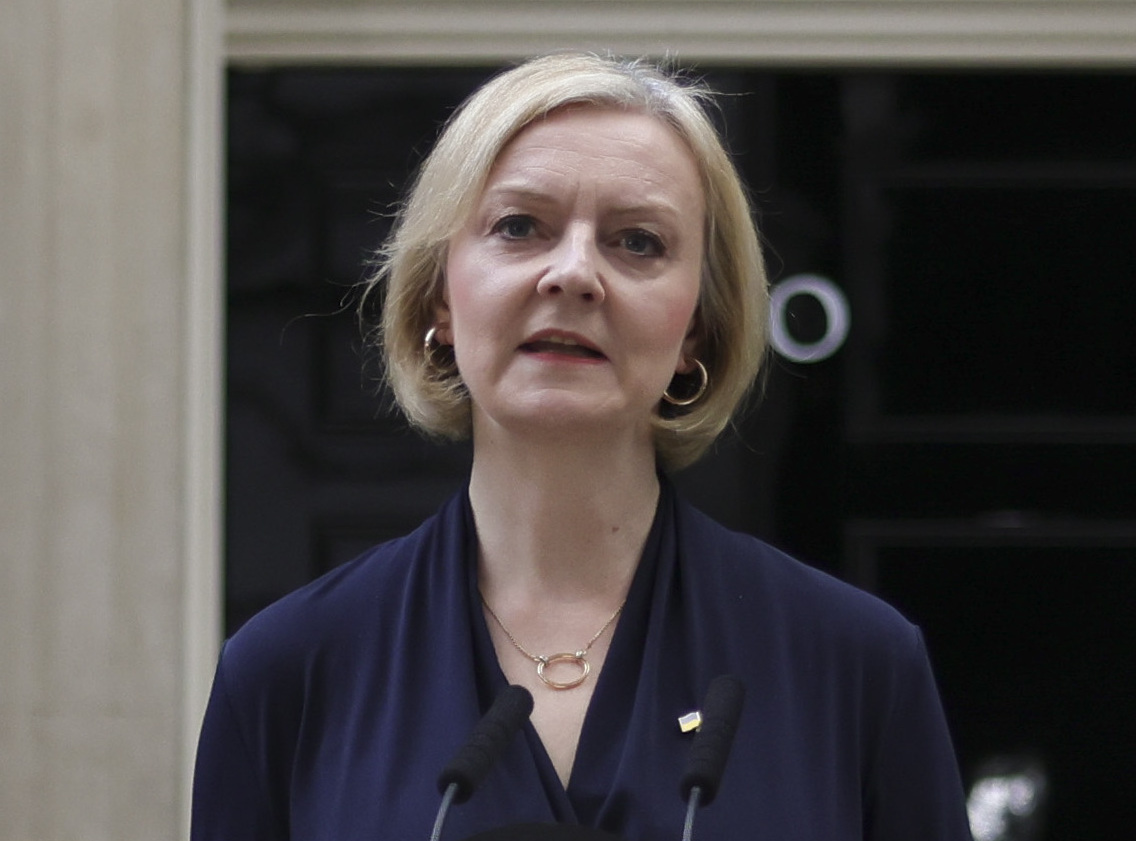
Truss announcing her resignation as prime minister on 20 October 2022

=== Cabinet and death of Elizabeth II ===
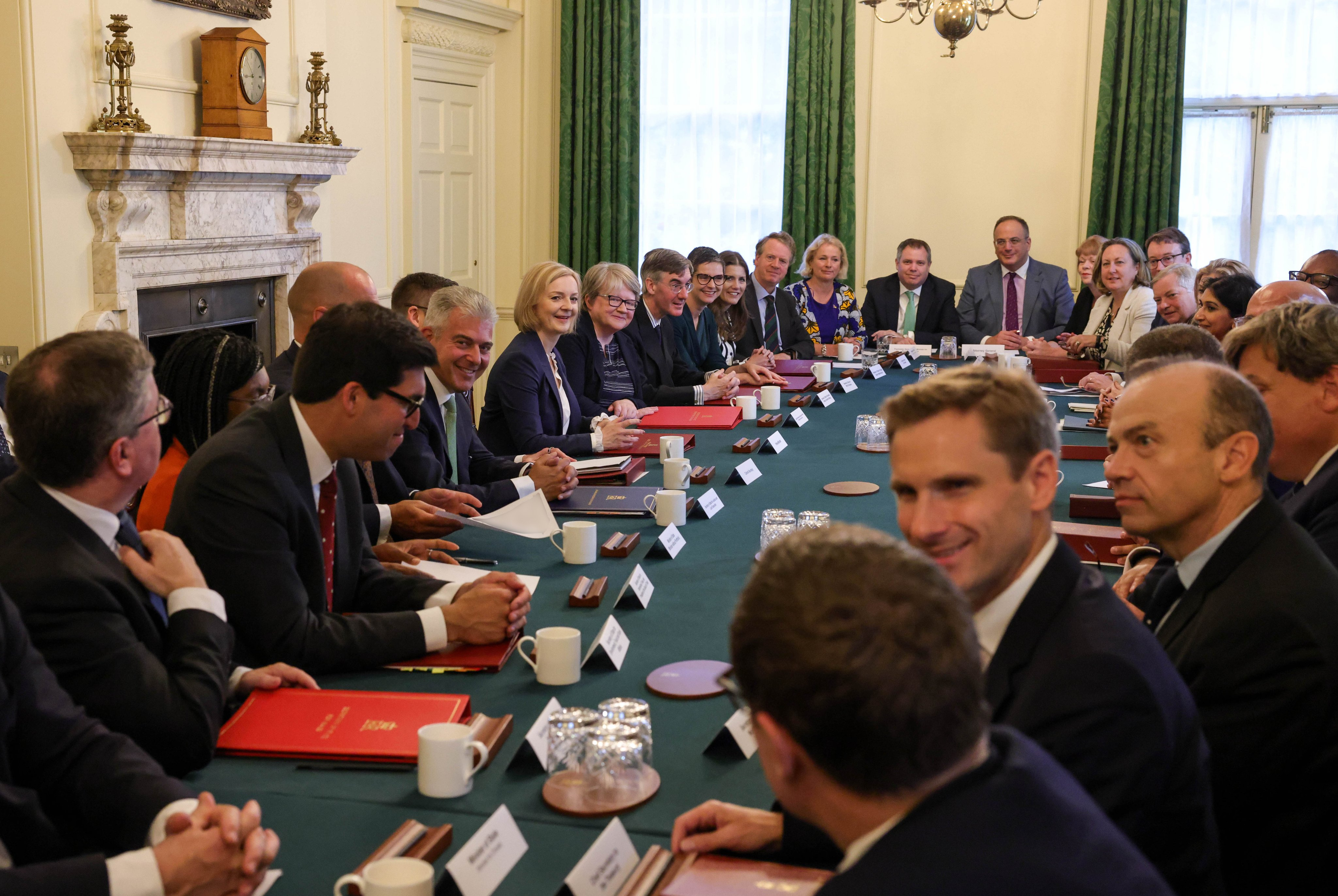
Truss chairing the first meeting of her cabinet

As the leader of the Conservative Party, the majority party in the House of Commons, Truss was appointed as prime minister by Elizabeth II at Balmoral Castle on 6 September 2022 and began to select her cabinet ministers.

With the appointment of Kwarteng as chancellor of the Exchequer, James Cleverly as foreign secretary and Suella Braverman as home secretary, for the first time in British history, no white men held any of the Great Offices of State. Other appointments included Thérèse Coffey as deputy prime minister and health secretary, Jacob Rees-Mogg as business secretary, Kemi Badenoch as international trade secretary, Kit Malthouse as education secretary, Penny Mordaunt as leader of the House of Commons and Michelle Donelan as culture secretary. Truss retained Ben Wallace as defence secretary, Alok Sharma as president for COP26, Alister Jack as Scotland secretary, Robert Buckland as Wales secretary and James Heappey as minister of state for the armed forces and veterans. Her cabinet was composed almost entirely of those who had supported her during the leadership contest.

Truss was the fifteenth and final British prime minister to serve under Elizabeth II, who died on 8 September, two days after appointing Truss. She was told in the early morning that the Queen was unwell and likely to survive a "matter of hours, not days"; Truss ordered black clothes from her Greenwich home in anticipation of the Queen's death, as she had not yet had time to move her belongings to Westminster. Upon Elizabeth's death, Truss delivered a statement outside 10 Downing Street paying tribute to her:

Queen Elizabeth II was the rock on which modern Britain was built. Our country has grown and flourished under her reign. Britain is the great country it is today because of her. ... Through thick and thin, Queen Elizabeth II provided us with the stability and the strength that we needed. She was the very spirit of Great Britain, and that spirit will endure.

On 10 September Truss attended Charles III's accession ceremony and took an oath of allegiance to the King with fellow senior MPs. On 19 September she attended the Queen's funeral service in Westminster Abbey, reading the second lesson.

=== Domestic policies and mini-budget ===
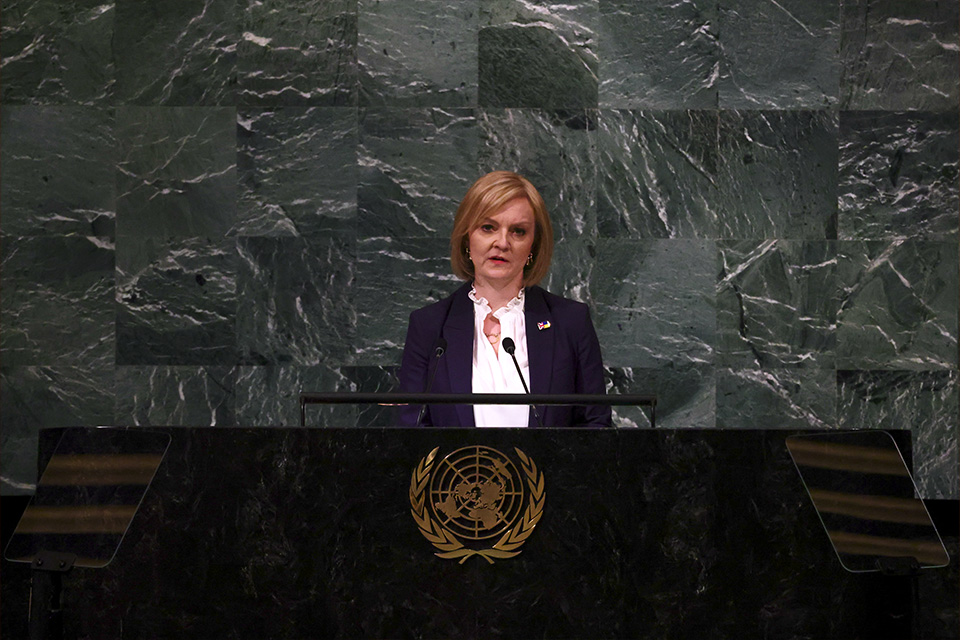
Truss spoke at the UN General Assembly in September 2022.

On 8 September, in response to the ongoing cost of living crisis, Truss announced the Energy Price Guarantee, which was planned to cap average household energy bills at £2,500 per year, costing between 31 and £140 billion for the two years it covered. Truss, who announced the measure in the House of Commons, made an effort to keep the energy cap and the tax plan announcements – which the Chancellor was planned to unveil – separate.

On 23 September, Kwarteng announced a controversial mini-budget which proposed cutting taxation significantly, including abolishing the 45 per cent rate of income tax and the proposed Health and Social Care Levy, cutting stamp duty and the basic rate of income tax and cancelling rises in National Insurance contributions and corporation tax; the package, which had been constructed by Truss and Kwarteng together, was to be funded by borrowing and was intended to stimulate economic growth. The mini-budget was received badly by financial markets because it included temporary spending measures whilst permanently cutting tax rates. It was blamed for the pound falling to its lowest ever rate against the US dollar (US$1.033) and prompted a response from the Bank of England which, amongst other measures, bought up government bonds; the public reaction was also broadly negative. The mini-budget was criticised by the International Monetary Fund, the American president, Joe Biden, the Labour Party and many within Truss's party, including the senior politicians Michael Gove and Grant Shapps. The government bonds, bought for £19.3 billion, were sold over the following sixteen months for £23.1 billion, yielding a net profit of £3.8bn for HM Treasury.

=== Government crisis and resignation ===
I think it's a shambles and a disgrace ... I hope all those people that put Liz Truss in Number 10, I hope it was worth it. I hope it was worth it for the ministerial red box, I hope it was worth it to sit round the Cabinet table because the damage they have done to our party is extraordinary.

— Charles Walker's remarks on the market fallout, subsequent government crisis and Conservative unpopularity.

After initially defending the mini-budget, on 3 October Truss instructed Kwarteng to reverse the abolition of the 45 per cent income tax additional rate. She later reversed the cut in corporation tax and dismissed Kwarteng, replacing him with Jeremy Hunt on 14 October. Hunt reversed many of the remaining policies announced in the mini-budget, leading to further instability; because of Truss's perceived weakness, he was described by some Conservative MPs and newspapers as the de facto prime minister. During this time, Truss became increasingly unpopular with the public, and contributed to a large fall in support for the Conservatives; in October, she became the most unpopular prime minister in British history, with her personal approval rating recorded in one survey as nine per cent. She was pilloried in national and international press as a u-turner, and a chaotic vote on fracking along with the resignation of Braverman as home secretary compounded a rapid deterioration of confidence in her leadership. On 19 October, in response to a question by the leader of the opposition, Keir Starmer, Truss said that she was a "fighter and not a quitter", quoting a 2001 phrase by Peter Mandelson.

Shortly before noon on 20 October, Truss's forty-fifth day in office, Brady held a meeting with Truss where she asked if she would be able to remain in office; his response was "I don't think so, Prime Minister". At 1:35 pm, Truss announced her resignation as the leader of the Conservative Party and as prime minister. She gave the following 89-second-long statement:

I came into office at a time of great economic and international instability. Families and businesses were worried about how to pay their bills. Putin's illegal war in Ukraine threatens the security of our whole continent. And our country has been held back by for too long by low economic growth. I was elected by the Conservative Party with a mandate to change this. We delivered on energy bills and on cutting National Insurance. And we set out a vision for a low-tax, high-growth economy that would take advantage of the freedoms of Brexit. I recognise though, given the situation, I cannot deliver the mandate on which I was elected by the Conservative Party. I have therefore spoken to His Majesty the King to notify him that I am resigning as leader of the Conservative Party. This morning I met the chairman of the 1922 Committee, Sir Graham Brady. We've agreed there will be a leadership election to be completed within the next week. This will ensure that we remain on a path to deliver our fiscal plans and maintain our country's economic stability and national security. I will remain as prime minister until a successor has been chosen. Thank you.

Heale describes a "funereal atmosphere" within the government in the days following her resignation statement. She was succeeded by Sunak as leader of the Conservative Party on 24 October and the next day advised the King to appoint him as the new prime minister; Sunak went on to further reverse many of the economic measures she had made as prime minister but retained Hunt as chancellor. Resigning on her fiftieth day, Truss became the shortest-serving prime minister in British history, surpassing George Canning, who was prime minister for 119 days in 1827. (Note: Canning's premiership ended with his death, rather than the loss of a general election or by resignation.) The short length of her premiership was the subject of much ridicule, including a livestream of a head of lettuce, started the previous week by the Daily Star tabloid newspaper, which invited viewers to speculate whether Truss would resign before the lettuce wilted.

== Post-premiership (since 2022) ==
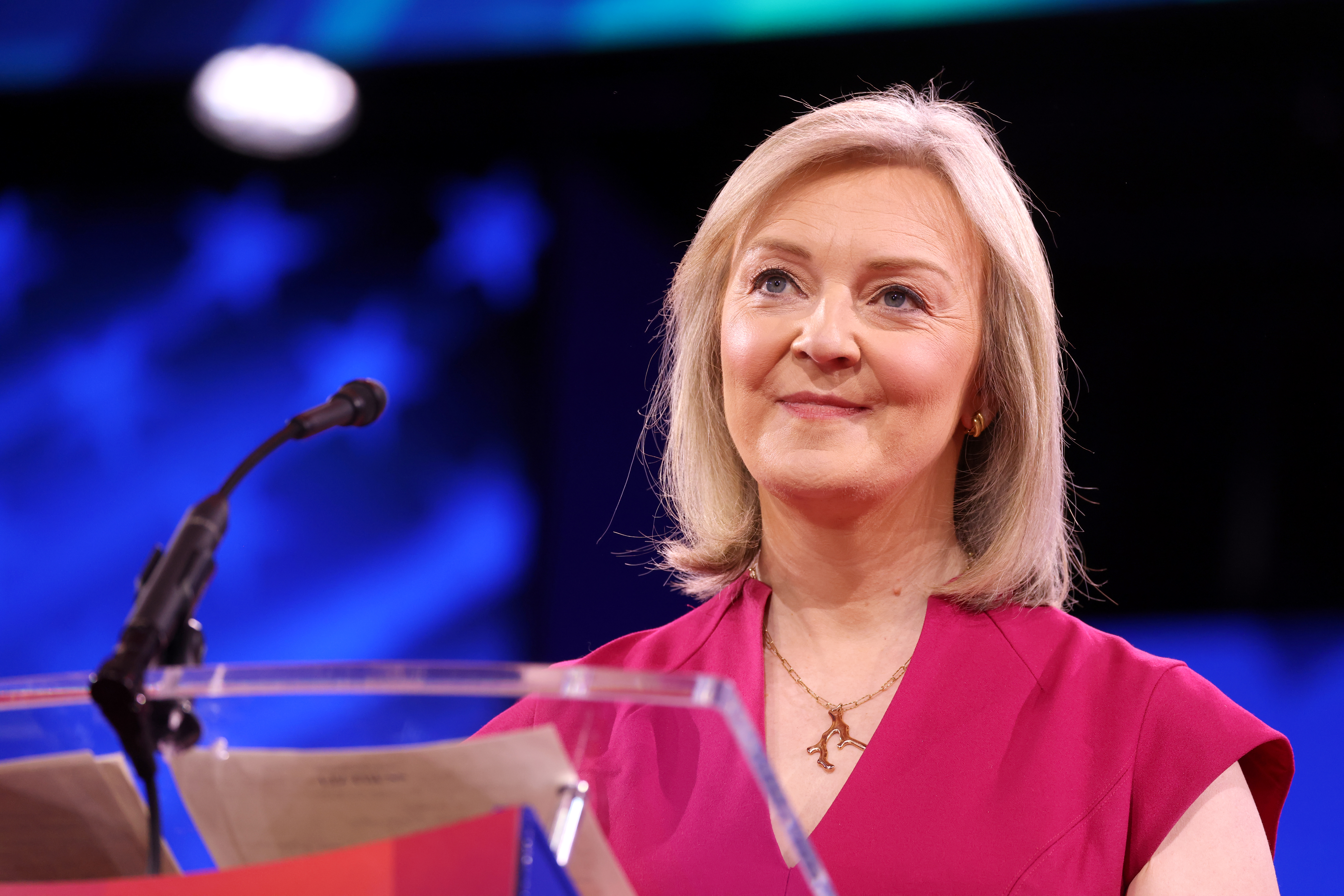
Truss speaking at the 2025 Conservative Political Action Conference

Truss was reselected as the Conservative candidate for South West Norfolk in February 2023 and in August that year, she submitted the list of her resignation honours, which were released in December to coincide with the 2024 New Year Honours. Her memoir which covered her premiership, Ten Years to Save the West, was published in April 2024. That same month, Truss gave a speech to the Institute for Government think tank in which she blamed "groupthink" amongst officials and the media for the collapse of her premiership. Similarly, in October at the Conservative Party Conference, she held an event dubbed the "Great British Growth Rally" which was attended by hundreds of Conservative Party members, in contrast to government ministers who gave speeches to a hall which was, according to the Telegraph, "at times almost empty". In February 2024 she co-launched the Popular Conservatism group with others including Jacob Rees-Mogg, Lee Anderson and Priti Patel and spoke at its inaugural event. The 2024 general election, held on 4 July, resulted in Truss losing her seat, in which she was defending a majority of over 26,000, to the Labour challenger, Terry Jermy; the result was described as a Portillo moment by The Spectator, a right-leaning magazine.

Truss sparked controversy in September 2025 when she argued that the far-right anti-Islam activist Tommy Robinson had been "unfairly demonised" during an interview with Newsweek. In response, Labour's Education Secretary Bridget Phillipson and Liberal Democrat deputy leader Daisy Cooper called for her to be expelled from the Conservative Party.

On 5 December 2025 Truss launched her The Liz Truss Show, available on YouTube and other video services. Also in late 2025, Truss was reported to be working with property developer Robert Tchenguiz on recruiting founder members to fund conversion of a building in London's Curzon Street to house a private members' club, the Leconfield, described as "strategic nexus for a global network of pro-growth leaders". The proposed development was approved by Westminster City Council in May 2026. In October of that year she published a second memoir, Bank Job, through Free Speech Press.

== Political positions ==
=== Domestic issues ===
Truss has economically liberal views and supports free trade and deregulation. She supports the neoliberal philosophy of supply-side economics, often referred to as "trickle-down economics". After Truss's dismissal of Kwarteng and Hunt's reversal of many of the mini-budget's economic measures, the BBC's economics editor Faisal Islam wrote that "Trussonomics is dead".

During her time as a Liberal Democrat, Truss supported the abolition of the monarchy. In 2022 a video of a 19-year-old Truss at the 1994 Liberal Democrat Conference criticising the notion of people being "born to rule" resurfaced; in an interview with LBC during her leadership campaign, Truss stated that "almost as soon as I made the speech, I regretted it". In 2021 Truss stated that the Conservatives should "reject the zero-sum game of identity politics, [reject] the illiberalism of cancel culture, and [reject] the soft bigotry of low expectations that holds so many people back". She voted to legalise same-sex marriage but has opposed the expansion of transgender rights. Truss spoke against gender self-identification, stating that "medical checks are important" and that "only women have a cervix". Despite initially supporting single-sex toilets being restricted on the basis of biological sex, she later said in February 2022 that the government was not interested in enacting such a measure.

=== Foreign policy ===
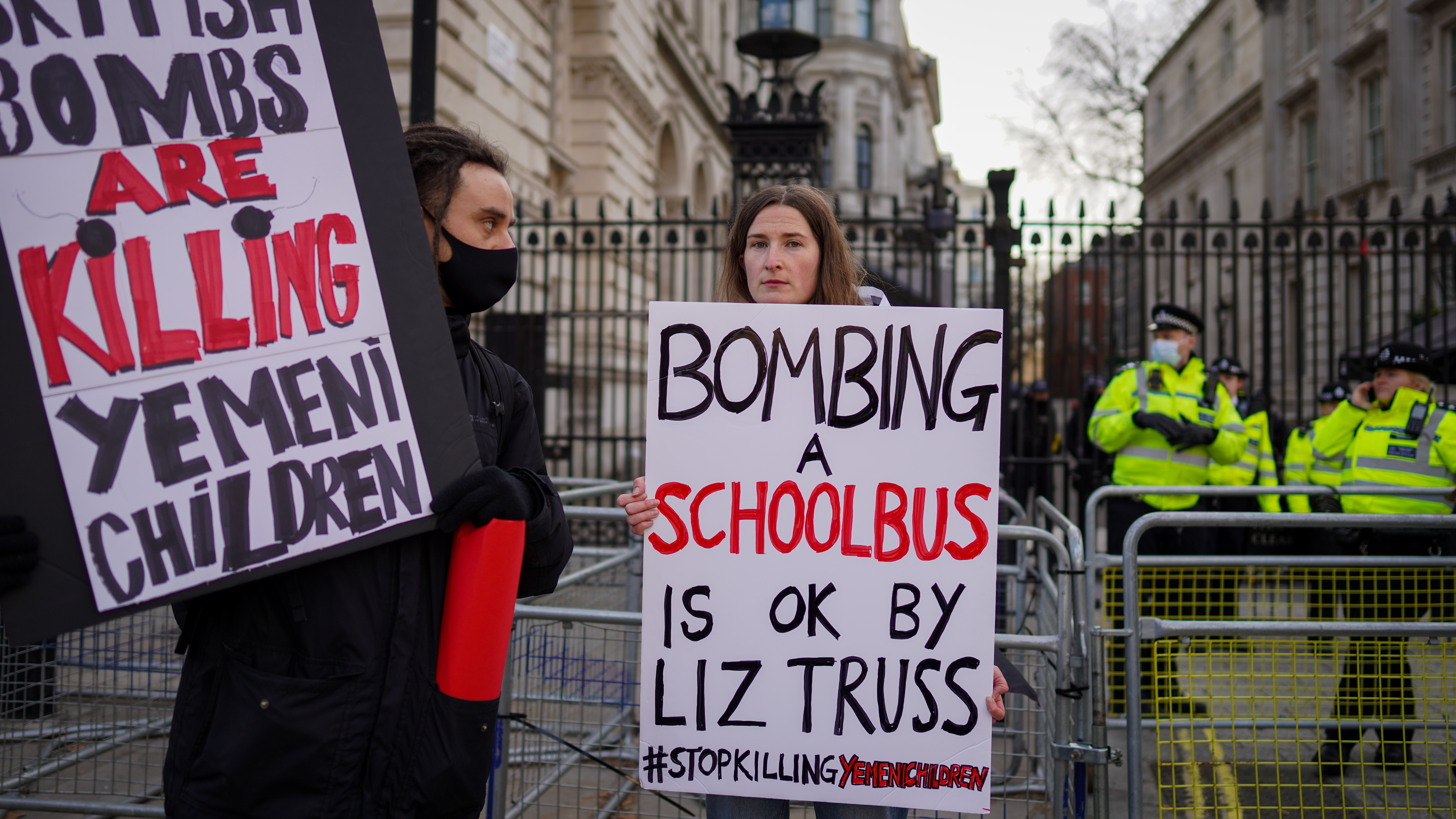
Protesters highlighting Britain's complicity in Saudi Arabia's bombing campaign against Yemen

Truss was described as a hawkish foreign secretary. She called for Britain to reduce its economic dependency on China and Russia and supported certain diplomatic and economic sanctions imposed by the British government against the former. Truss has supported Taiwan in the context of deteriorating cross-strait relations but, citing precedent, refused to visit the island as prime minister and condemned the Chinese government's treatment of the Uyghur people as "genocide". In 2022 she called Saudi Arabia a British ally but said she was not "condoning" the country's policies, including its handling of human rights and its treatment of women.

Truss supported the United Kingdom remaining in the European Union during the 2016 referendum. Since the referendum, Truss has supported Brexit, and publicly stated in 2017 that she had changed her mind. During the July 2022 leadership election Truss said that "I was wrong and I am prepared to admit I was wrong".

== Personal life ==
During her chairship of the Lewisham Deptford Conservatives, at a reception at the Greenwich Conservative Association, Truss met her future husband, Hugh O'Leary, whom she married in 2000 and with whom she has two daughters: Frances (born 2006) and Liberty (born 2008).

== Notes and references ==
Notes

== Sources ==
=== Books and journals ===
- Allen, Nicholas (6 January 2023). "Those who wear the crown wield the knife: the brutality of recent takeover reshuffles". The Political Quarterly. 94 (1): 36–44. doi:10.1111/1467-923X.13229.
- Aylott, Nicholas; Bolin, Niklas; Webb, Paul (2020). Managing Leader Selection in European Political Parties. Springer International Publishing. ISBN 978-3-03-055000-4.
- Bassett, Dale; Bosanquet, Nicholas; Haldenby, Andrew; Nolan, Patrick; Parsons, Lucy; Thraves, Laurie; Truss, Liz (2009). Back to Black: Budget 2009 Paper. Scribd Inc. ISBN 978-1-905730-18-6.
- Bennie, Lynn G.; Jones, Richard Wyn; Scully, Roger; Trystan, Dafydd (2002). The 2001 General Election. Frank Cass & Co. ISBN 978-0-71-468303-4.
- Bogdanor, Vernon (December 2022). "Choosing the Conservative leader: a view from history". The Political Quarterly. 93 (4): 564–575. doi:10.1111/1467-923X.13207.
- Cole, Harry; Heale, James (2022). Out of the Blue: The Inside Story of the Unexpected Rise and Rapid Fall of Liz Truss. HarperCollins. ISBN 978-0-00-860578-0.
- Diamond, Patrick; Richards, David; Sanders, Anna; Westwood, Andy (15 February 2023). "Levelling up the UK: If not the Conservatives, will Labour learn the lessons from past policy failings?". The Political Quarterly. 94 (3): 358–367. doi:10.1111/1467-923X.13234.
- Fall, Catherine (2020). The Gatekeeper: Life at the Heart of No. 10. HQ. ISBN 978-0-00-833612-7.
- Hickson, Kevin; Williams, Ben (3 February 2023). "Boris Johnson and beyond: The revival of one nation conservatism?". French Journal of British Studies. XXVIII (1). doi:10.4000/rfcb.10621.
- Jones, Bill; Norton, Philip; Kelly, Richard (2014). Politics UK (8 ed.). Taylor & Francis. ISBN 978-1-31-758103-1.
- Kutllovci, Liza (20 November 2022). "Hardwired ... to self-destruct: the (un)remarkable prime ministership of Liz Truss". European View. 21 (2): 223–224. doi:10.1177/17816858221139076.
- Li, Yuxuan Ye (26 February 2023). "Britain's economic crisis in mini-budget perspective". Academic Journal of Management and Social Sciences. 2 (1): 1–5. doi:10.54097/ajmss.v2i1.5400. Archived from the original on 30 August 2023 – via DrPress.
- Marsh, David (22 June 2023). "Britain's failed attempt at monetary and fiscal exceptionalism". The Economist's Voice. 20 (1): 119–130. doi:10.1515/ev-2023-0021.
- Middleton, Alia (28 May 2023). "United Kingdom: political developments and data in 2022". European Journal of Political Research. 62: 5–6. doi:10.1111/2047-8852.12401.
- Payne, Sebastian (2022). The Fall of Boris Johnson: The Full Story. Macmillan Publishers. ISBN 978-1-03-501655-6.
- Seldon, Anthony; Egerton, Tom, eds. (2024). The Conservative Effect 2010–2024: 14 Wasted Years?. Cambridge University Press. ISBN 978-1-00-947310-1.
- Seldon, Anthony; Newell, Raymond (2023). Johnson at 10: The Inside Story. Atlantic Books. ISBN 978-1-83-895802-2.
- Seldon, Anthony; Newell, Raymond (2020). May at 10: The Verdict. Biteback Publishing. ISBN 978-1-785-90618-3.
- Worthy, Ben (24 October 2022). "Will Truss's time end in failure? Assessing the prospects of the latest 'takeover' prime minister". The Political Quarterly. 93 (4): 717–722. doi:10.1111/1467-923X.13199. S2CID 253144412. Archived from the original on 26 August 2023 – via Wiley Online Library.

=== News ===
- Adler, Katya (5 September 2022). "Liz Truss: The urgency of relations with Europe". BBC News. Archived from the original on 6 September 2022.
- "A-level shake up will 'end the treadmill' of repeated exams". BBC News. 23 January 2013. Archived from the original on 7 June 2019.
- Allegretti, Aubrey (25 October 2022). "'Be bold': Liz Truss lays down gauntlet to Rishi Sunak in final speech as UK prime minister". The Guardian. Archived from the original on 25 October 2022.
- Anthony, Andrew (22 October 2022). "From fighter to quitter: the 'weird' rise and fall of Liz Truss". The Guardian. Archived from the original on 1 November 2022.
- Asthana, Anushka (9 June 2012). "The lady's for turning, right from CND to Conservative". The Times. Archived from the original on 14 March 2016.
- "At a glance: What's in the mini-budget?". BBC News. 23 September 2022. Archived from the original on 23 September 2022.
- "BBC Democracy Live: Elizabeth Truss MP". BBC News. 2014. Archived from the original on 17 July 2014.
- Belam, Martin (29 July 2022). "Loves cheese, hates her first name: 10 things you may not know about Liz Truss". The Guardian. Archived from the original on 10 August 2022.
- Blewett, Sam (21 September 2021). "UK considering trade pact with US, Mexico and Canada". The Independent. Archived from the original on 21 September 2021.
- Bond, Richard (12 December 2014). "Norfolk and Suffolk business welcomes completion of dual carriageway". BBC News. Archived from the original on 31 July 2022.
- Bowcott, Owen (21 July 2016). "Liz Truss sworn in as first ever female Lord Chancellor". The Guardian. Archived from the original on 13 October 2020.
- Bray, Chad (4 September 2022). "Will Truss live up to hawkish language on China as British prime minister?". South China Morning Post. Archived from the original on 6 September 2022.
- Brown, Faye (20 October 2022). "Chaos among Tory MPs as Labour motion to force vote on fracking bill is defeated". Sky News. Archived from the original on 20 October 2022.
- Burden, Lizzy (15 August 2020). "Cheese proves to be biggest stumbling block in UK-Japan trade negotiations". The Daily Telegraph. Archived from the original on 3 November 2021.
- Bush, Stephen (27 February 2020). "Boris Johnson may end up defined by his Henry VIII-style search for the perfect chancellor". New Statesman. Archived from the original on 27 July 2022.
- "Campaign aim to keep Tornado base at RAF Marham". BBC News. 13 November 2010. Archived from the original on 25 June 2022.
- Carrington, Damian (29 March 2012). "Pesticides linked to honeybee decline". The Guardian. Archived from the original on 31 January 2021.
- Carrington, Damian (23 July 2015). "UK suspends ban on pesticides linked to serious harm in bees". The Guardian. Archived from the original on 28 January 2021.
- Cheeseman, Abbie (19 September 2021). "Nazanin Zaghari-Ratcliffe's family call on foreign secretary to sanction 10 Iranians involved in 'hostage diplomacy'". The Daily Telegraph. Archived from the original on 21 September 2021.
- Chaplain, Chloe (21 February 2022). "Government 'has no interest' in banning trans people from single-sex toilets, Liz Truss tells equalities tsar". i. Archived from the original on 30 July 2022.
- Coates, Sam (20 March 2018). "Liz Truss, chief secretary to the twittersphere". The Times. Archived from the original on 5 November 2021.
- Cohen, Patricia (28 September 2022). "Pound's swoon echoes declines in British power, past and present". The New York Times. Archived from the original on 30 September 2022.
- Cole, Harry (5 November 2022). "That. Is. A. Dis. Grace! The inside story of Liz Truss's pork markets speech". The Times. Archived from the original on 5 November 2022.
- Coughlan, Sean (21 June 2012). "Maths should be compulsory until 18, says MP report". BBC News. Archived from the original on 24 June 2022.
- Courea, Eleni (10 August 2022). "Liz Truss summons Chinese ambassador over 'escalation' in Taiwan". Politico. Archived from the original on 10 August 2022.
- Craig, Jon (26 June 2018). "Liz Truss slams 'macho' male ministers in thinly-veiled attack on Cabinet colleagues". Sky News. Archived from the original on 9 January 2022.
- Crerar, Pippa (16 October 2022). "Joe Biden: Liz Truss tax cuts a 'mistake' and 'I wasn't the only one' who thought so". The Guardian. Archived from the original on 16 October 2022.
- Dathan, Matt (6 August 2023). "Liz Truss hands out one gong for every four days she was in No 10". The Times. Archived from the original on 6 August 2023.
- Dathan, Matt (1 November 2021). "Liz Truss pulls no punches about 'genocide' of Uighurs by China". The Times. Archived from the original on 1 November 2021.
- Davies, Gareth (17 October 2022). "Jeremy Hunt now 'de facto' prime minister, says senior Tory". The Daily Telegraph. Archived from the original on 17 October 2022.
- Diver, Tony (3 October 2021). "Transgender people should not have right to self-identify without medical checks, Liz Truss says". The Sunday Telegraph. Archived from the original on 30 July 2022.
- Dominiczak, Peter (6 June 2013). "Childcare reforms would have cost more for families, claims Nick Clegg". The Daily Telegraph. Archived from the original on 6 August 2022.
- Eardley, Nick (3 October 2022). "Kwasi Kwarteng U-turns on plans to scrap 45p tax rate". BBC News. Archived from the original on 3 October 2022.
- Elgot, Jessica; Crerar, Pippa (27 June 2018). "Liz Truss lambasts colleagues as cabinet divisions grow". The Guardian. Archived from the original on 3 November 2021.
- Elgot, Jessica; O'Carroll, Lisa (10 May 2022). "Liz Truss 'preparing to scrap parts of Northern Ireland protocol'". The Guardian. Archived from the original on 10 May 2022.
- Elgot, Jessica (10 November 2016). "Liz Truss rebuffs criticism over newspaper attacks on Brexit judges". The Guardian. Archived from the original on 8 November 2020.
- Ellery, Ben (22 July 2022). "How Liz Truss's Tory transformation left her liberal family behind". The Times. Archived from the original on 23 July 2022.
- Elliott, Larry (20 September 2022). "Liz Truss favours trickle down economics but results can be trickle up". The Guardian. Archived from the original on 20 September 2022.
- Falconer, Charles (25 July 2016). "This row over Liz Truss as Lord Chancellor isn't about gender. It's about the law". The Guardian. Archived from the original on 8 November 2020.
- Ferguson, Donna (9 September 2023). "Liz Truss to 'share lessons' of her time in government in new book". The Guardian. Archived from the original on 9 September 2023.
- "Former 'Turnip Taliban' dissenter now backing Truss to be PM". Eastern Daily Press. 29 July 2022. Archived from the original on 22 August 2023.
- Forrest, Adam (6 February 2024). "Liz Truss 'PopCons' comeback bid hit by chaos as key Tory allies drop out". The Independent. Archived from the original on 6 February 2024.
- Gibb, Frances (19 July 2016). "Justice minister quits with blast at 'novice' Lord Chancellor". The Times. Archived from the original on 17 May 2019.
- Gilchrist, Karen (22 September 2022). "Britain pursues 'trickle-down economics' despite scorn from Biden. And the stakes are sky-high". CNBC. Archived from the original on 23 September 2022.
- Glancy, Josh; Daniel, Hugo (3 September 2022). "Just where is Liz Truss from? Her incredible journey spans three countries and two continents". The Sunday Times. Archived from the original on 4 September 2022.
- Gosden, Emily (31 October 2009). "Affair of Elizabeth Truss exposes Tory tensions". The Times. Archived from the original on 4 November 2021.
- Grice, Andrew (5 September 2014). "The 'golden generation' of 2010 Tory MPs comes to an early end". The Independent. Archived from the original on 11 September 2014.
- Grierson, Jamie (19 August 2022a). "Liz Truss called for patients to be charged for GP visits, 2009 paper reveals". The Guardian. Archived from the original on 19 August 2022.
- Grierson, Jamie (15 February 2022b). "Russia-Ukraine crisis a 'dangerous moment for the world', warns Truss". The Guardian. Archived from the original on 15 February 2022.
- Grylls, George; Norfolk, Andrew; Wace, Charlotte (1 September 2022). "Liz Truss: from teenage Lib Dem to darling of the Tory right". The Times. Archived from the original on 5 September 2022.
- Grylls, George; Wright, Oliver (16 September 2021). "Liz Truss's promotion makes a rare piece of cabinet history". The Times. Archived from the original on 16 September 2021.
- Gutteridge, Nick (2 October 2023). "Hundreds queue to watch Liz Truss rally at Tory conference". The Daily Telegraph. Archived from the original on 2 October 2023.
- Hickey, Sally (27 September 2022). "IMF warns UK over mini-Budget tax cuts". Financial Times. Archived from the original on 28 September 2022.
- Hill, Chris (14 May 2020). "MPs 'missed opportunity' to secure vital safeguards for food standards, say farmers". Eastern Daily Press. Archived from the original on 25 September 2023.
- Holly, Patrick (4 August 2022). "Tory leadership: Liz Truss says she will not visit Taiwan if elected prime minister". The Independent. Archived from the original on 3 September 2022.
- Hope, Christopher (13 November 2009). "David Cameron phones local grandee". The Daily Telegraph. Archived from the original on 25 June 2022.
- Hughes, Laura (3 November 2016). "Cuts to prison officers to be reversed amid mounting concern over rising levels of re-offending". The Daily Telegraph. Archived from the original on 3 November 2016.
- "In full: Prime Minister Liz Truss pays tribute to Queen". BBC News. 8 September 2022. Archived from the original on 8 September 2022.
- Inman, Phillip (26 September 2022). "Why is sterling falling and what does it mean for the rest of the world?". The Guardian. Archived from the original on 26 September 2022.
- Islam, Faisal (16 October 2022). "Jeremy Hunt buries Truss's economic experiment". BBC News. Archived from the original on 16 October 2022.
- James, William; Macaskill, Andrew (7 September 2022). "New British PM Truss brings tougher UK stance on China". Reuters. Archived from the original on 7 September 2022.
- Jowit, Juliette (29 January 2013). "Childcare reform proposals face fierce criticism". The Guardian. Archived from the original on 12 November 2020.
- Landler, Mark (5 September 2022). "A hawkish diplomat takes control, facing hard times and Johnson's ghost". The New York Times. Archived from the original on 6 September 2022.
- Lawless, Jill; Hui, Sylvia (8 September 2022). "UK to cap energy prices, end fracking ban to ease crisis". The Daily Telegraph. Archived from the original on 30 September 2022.
- "Liz Truss reselected as South West Norfolk election candidate". BBC News. 22 February 2023. Archived from the original on 22 February 2023.
- Mason, Rowena (15 July 2014). "Liz Truss: strong media personality with big ideas on schooling". The Guardian. Archived from the original on 26 January 2021.
- Mason, Rowena; Elgot, Jessica; Allegretti, Aubrey (3 October 2021). "Conservatives take aim at cancel culture and 'woke aggression'". The Guardian. Archived from the original on 12 April 2022.
- Mathers, Matt (20 December 2021). "Liz Truss: UK's new Brexit negotiator said leaving EU would spell economic disaster". The Independent. Archived from the original on 4 January 2022.
- McAuley, Paul (7 September 2022). "Where new PM Liz Truss stands on LGBTQ+ issues". Liverpool Echo. Archived from the original on 21 August 2023.
- McGee, Luke (6 September 2022a). "Britain's new prime minister, Liz Truss, is a political shape-shifter. Now she's set for her toughest transformation yet". CNN. Archived from the original on 6 September 2022.
- McGee, Luke (14 October 2022b). "Liz Truss is in big trouble after her biggest U-turn yet". CNN. Archived from the original on 14 October 2022.
- McGuiness, Alan (31 July 2021). "UK 'closing in on' striking free trade agreement with New Zealand, Liz Truss says". Sky News. Archived from the original on 31 July 2021.
- McGurran, Deborah (1 December 2011). "Elizabeth Truss in a calculated move on maths". BBC News. Archived from the original on 21 June 2022.
- McGurran, Deborah (18 July 2014). "Elizabeth Truss joins the cabinet table in reshuffle". BBC News. Archived from the original on 20 June 2022.
- McGurran, Deborah (28 March 2012). "Norfolk MP calls for cash for maths". BBC News. Archived from the original on 26 June 2022.
- McSmith, Andy (26 July 2014a). "A political affair: We profile cabinet minister Liz Truss". Belfast Telegraph. Archived from the original on 2 February 2021.
- McSmith, Andy (18 July 2014b). "Liz Truss: Conqueror of the Turnip Taliban". The Independent. Archived from the original on 8 June 2022.
- Middleton, Joe; Mitchell, Archie (5 July 2024). "Liz Truss loses seat as ex-prime minister becomes biggest scalp in Tory bloodbath". The Independent. Archived from the original on 5 July 2024.
- Mitter, Rana (6 September 2022). "UK's Truss likely to pick a fight with China". Asia Times. Archived from the original on 6 September 2022.
- Morris, Sophie (25 October 2022a). "A goodbye speech and a meeting with the King: Here's what's happening today – and when". Sky News. Archived from the original on 25 October 2022.
- Morris, Sophie (12 May 2022b). "Liz Truss: UK will have 'no choice but to act' if EU does not show 'flexibility' over NI protocol". Sky News. Archived from the original on 12 May 2022.
- "MPs allege bullying during chaotic fracking vote". BBC News. 20 October 2022. Archived from the original on 20 October 2022.
- "New date for work on dualling A11 in Suffolk and Norfolk". BBC News. 22 March 2012. Archived from the original on 31 July 2022.
- "Newspaper headlines: Liz Truss 'faces new Tory rebellion' after tax cut U-turn". BBC News. 3 October 2022. Archived from the original on 4 October 2022.
- "Newspaper headlines: 'Time up' as 'Truss clings on by sacking Kwarteng'". BBC News. 15 October 2022. Archived from the original on 15 October 2022.
- Ni, Vincent (10 August 2022). "Liz Truss summons Chinese ambassador over aggression towards Taiwan". The Guardian. Archived from the original on 10 August 2022.
- O'Grady, Sean (14 October 2022). "Jeremy Hunt is now the de facto prime minister". The Independent. Archived from the original on 14 October 2022.
- Parker, George (28 October 2020). "Labour challenges Liz Truss over benefits to UK from Japan trade deal". Financial Times. Archived from the original on 1 November 2020.
- Parker, George; Hughes, Laura (10 February 2022). "How Liz Truss transformed herself from also-ran to potential PM". Financial Times. Archived from the original on 13 July 2022.
- Payne, Sebastian; Cameron-Chileshe, Jasmine; Pickard, Jim (6 September 2022). "Liz Truss installs close allies in top cabinet jobs". Financial Times. Archived from the original on 6 September 2022.
- Pengelly, Martin (18 July 2022). "I grew up where Liz Truss did, attended the same school. She's not telling you the truth". The Guardian. Archived from the original on 20 July 2022.
- Philp, Catherine; Parfitt, Tom; Waterfield, Bruno (10 February 2022). "Sergey Lavrov dismisses Liz Truss meeting as 'like talking to a deaf person'". The Times. Archived from the original on 19 February 2022.
- Pickard, Jim (21 July 2022). "Liz Truss attacks Rishi Sunak's economic record in bruising fight to be PM". Financial Times. Archived from the original on 26 July 2022.
- Pitel, Laura (12 March 2015). "Cigarettes to be sold in plain packets by 2016". The Times. Archived from the original on 14 April 2016.
- Plummer, Katie (16 March 2022). "Liz Truss calls Saudi Arabia an 'ally' but she cannot condone their policies – in less than a minute". The Independent. Archived from the original on 14 May 2022.
- "Pound hits record low after tax cut plans". BBC News. 26 September 2022. Archived from the original on 26 September 2022.
- Powell, Rob (30 December 2023). "Liz Truss resignation honours revealed as Kwasi Kwarteng and cabinet miss out". Sky News. Archived from the original on 11 January 2024.
- "Profile: Elizabeth Truss". The Sunday Times. 8 November 2009. Archived from the original on 18 July 2014.
- "Queen Elizabeth's funeral: Order of service at Westminster Abbey". BBC News. 19 September 2022. Archived from the original on 19 September 2022.
- Quinn, Ben (5 September 2022a). "How Liz Truss became leader of the Conservative party – a timeline". The Guardian. Archived from the original on 5 September 2022.
- Quinn, Ben (19 October 2022b). "'I'm a fighter not a quitter': Truss channels Peter Mandelson at PMQs". The Guardian. Archived from the original on 19 October 2022.
- Ratcliffe, Rebecca (10 September 2022). Taylor, Harry (ed.). "Charles III is proclaimed King". The Guardian. Archived from the original on 10 September 2022.
- Rayner, Gordon; Maidment, Jack (20 May 2019). "The Future of the Conservative Party: Dominic Raab proposes 'penny a year' income tax cut as Tory leadership race begins in earnest". The Daily Telegraph. Archived from the original on 4 February 2022.
- "Reshuffle at-a-glance: In, out and moved about". BBC News. 15 July 2014. Archived from the original on 6 March 2023.
- Riley-Smith, Ben (10 July 2022). "Liz Truss launches leadership bid with tax cut challenge to Rishi Sunak". The Daily Telegraph. Archived from the original on 12 July 2022.
- Rogers, Paul (19 May 2010). "Clegg hopes coalition will produce a great reforming government". The Times. Archived from the original on 23 August 2023.
- Rumbelow, Helen (6 September 2022). "What Liz Truss's children should expect at No 10". The Times. Archived from the original on 6 September 2022.
- Scott, Jennifer (5 September 2022). "Profile of a prime minister: Liz Truss's journey to Number 10". Sky News. Archived from the original on 28 May 2023.
- "Senior MPs take oath of allegiance to King Charles". BBC News. 10 September 2022. Archived from the original on 10 September 2022.
- Sillars, James (5 October 2022). "Energy price guarantee could cost taxpayer £140bn in 'extreme' scenario, market expert warns". Sky News. Archived from the original on 5 October 2022.
- "Solar farms are a blight on the landscape, says minister". BBC News. 18 July 2014. Archived from the original on 11 July 2022.
- Steerpike (29 July 2022). "Revealed: Liz Truss's youthful escapades". The Spectator. Archived from the original on 8 August 2022.
- Steerpike (5 July 2024). "Liz Truss loses her seat". The Spectator. Archived from the original on 5 July 2024.
- Stokes, Paul (12 January 2005). "Dumped candidate blames old Tory sexism". The Daily Telegraph. Archived from the original on 7 July 2022.
- Stone, Jo (21 October 2022). "Liz Truss's history of U-turns as PM steps down after just 45 days in power". The Independent. Archived from the original on 21 October 2022.
- Stratton, Allegra (8 May 2013). "Nick Clegg 'to block childcare ratio reforms'". BBC News. Archived from the original on 6 August 2022.
- Swinford, Steven (30 November 2021). "Liz Truss takes after Margaret Thatcher in a tank as she criticises Russia". The Times. Archived from the original on 1 December 2021.
- Syal, Rajeev; Sinmaz, Emine; Quinn, Ben; Walker, Peter (30 July 2022). "Ambition greater than ability: Liz Truss's rise from teen Lib Dem to would-be PM". The Guardian. Archived from the original on 31 July 2022.
- Syal, Rajeev (19 July 2016). "Liz Truss camp accuses Tory justice committee chair of misogyny". The Guardian. Archived from the original on 29 November 2022.
- Taylor, Will (28 July 2022). "Truss says no gender surgery for kids as Sunak accused of 'stabbing Boris in the back'". LBC. Archived from the original on 28 July 2022.
- Thomas, Daniel (8 September 2022a). "Energy bills to be capped at £2,500 for typical household". BBC News. Archived from the original on 8 September 2022.
- Thomas, Helen (17 October 2022b). "Liz Truss's energy U-turn leaves market in chaos". Financial Times. Archived from the original on 17 October 2022.
- Thykjaer, Christina; Landauro, Inti (30 June 2022). "Important we make sure Taiwan can defend itself, UK's Truss says". Reuters. Archived from the original on 30 June 2022.
- "Tory woman wins selection battle". BBC News. 17 November 2009. Archived from the original on 13 August 2017.
- Travis, Alan (3 November 2016a). "Prisons in England and Wales to get 2,500 extra staff to tackle violence". The Guardian. Archived from the original on 30 September 2019.
- Travis, Alan (27 October 2016b). "Prison violence epidemic partly due to staff cuts, MoJ admits". The Guardian. Archived from the original on 16 April 2019.
- Truss, Liz (12 September 2011). "After the Coalition: here is a Tory formula for a better future". The Daily Telegraph. Archived from the original on 12 September 2011.
- Truss, Liz (8 May 2018). "How I took back control on Instagram after becoming a cheesy meme". The Times. Archived from the original on 5 November 2021.
- Turner, Camilla (13 October 2022). "Just nine per cent have a favourable view of Liz Truss". The Daily Telegraph. Archived from the original on 13 October 2022.
- "Ukraine war: Liz Truss says Russia sanctions should end only after withdrawal". BBC News. 27 March 2022. Archived from the original on 27 March 2022.
- "UK signs first major post-Brexit trade deal with Japan". BBC News. 11 September 2020. Archived from the original on 15 April 2022.
- Vinter, Robyn (13 July 2022). "Liz Truss criticised for saying her Leeds school 'let down' children". The Guardian. Archived from the original on 14 July 2022.
- Wadsworth, John (7 October 2022). "Liz Truss should focus on nursery funding, not staffing ratios". The Guardian. Archived from the original on 7 October 2022.
- Walker, Peter (10 July 2022). "Foreign Secretary Liz Truss joins Tory leadership race". BBC News. Archived from the original on 12 July 2022.
- Walker, Peter; Grierson, Jamie (20 October 2022). "Three more Tory MPs call for Liz Truss to step down after day of chaos". The Guardian. Archived from the original on 20 October 2022.
- Walker, Peter (18 September 2023). "Liz Truss blames 'groupthink' for economic damage under her watch". The Guardian. Archived from the original on 18 September 2023.
- Walker, Peter; Elgot, Jessica; Allegretti, Aubrey (14 October 2022). "Liz Truss to raise corporation tax in another humiliating U-turn". The Guardian. Archived from the original on 14 October 2022.
- Watt, Nicholas (4 November 2014). "Liz Truss: leave lawnmower in the shed to protect UK's bees". The Guardian. Archived from the original on 9 January 2020.
- Weaver, Matthew (20 October 2022). "Iceberg lettuce in blond wig outlasts Liz Truss". The Guardian. ISSN 0261-3077. Archived from the original on 3 January 2025.
- Whannel, Kate; Mason, Chris (20 October 2022). "Suella Braverman quits and vote chaos add to turmoil for PM". BBC News. Archived from the original on 20 October 2022.
- Wheeler, Brian; Francis, Sam (6 September 2022). "Who is Liz Truss? From teenage Lib Dem to Tory PM". BBC News. Archived from the original on 6 September 2022.
- Wintour, Patrick (23 December 2020). "Liz Truss and Foreign Office split over policy on China and Uighurs". The Guardian. Archived from the original on 23 December 2020.
- Wintour, Patrick; Malik, Shiv (29 January 2013). "Childcare restrictions to be relaxed, minister announces". The Guardian. Archived from the original on 27 October 2020.
- Woodcock, Andrew (19 October 2022a). "Liz Truss government rocked by day of chaos". The Independent. Archived from the original on 19 October 2022.
- Woodcock, Andrew (11 September 2022b). "Liz Truss informed early on Thursday that Queen may die that day". The Independent. Archived from the original on 11 September 2022.
- Woods, Allan (5 September 2022). "Why Liz Truss – Britain's incoming, hardline PM – has a 'sweet spot' for Canada". Toronto Star. Archived from the original on 5 September 2022.
- Yorke, Harry (29 August 2020). "Liz Truss to set out ambition for a 'gold standard' trade deal with Australia". The Daily Telegraph. Archived from the original on 29 August 2020.
- Zeffman, Henry (5 September 2022a). "Great offices of state set to contain no white men". The Times. Archived from the original on 11 September 2022.
- Zeffman, Henry (7 September 2022b). "Liz Truss's cabinet of allies banishes Rishi Sunak supporters to the back benches". The Times. Archived from the original on 7 September 2022.

=== Websites and others ===
- Haldenby, Andrew; Parsons, Lucy; Rosen, Greg; Truss, Liz (March 2009). "Fit for Purpose". Academia.edu. Reform. Archived from the original on 7 September 2022.
- Minors, Michael; Grenham, Dennis (1998). London Borough Council elections 7 May 1998: Including the Greater London Authority referendum results (PDF). London Research Centre. ISBN 978-1-85-261276-4. Archived from the original (PDF) on 8 October 2016.
- Pullig, Heidi; León-Ledesma, Miguel (5 October 2022). "Blowing the budget: expert explains why the Conservative mini-budget is so toxic". University of Kent. Archived from the original on 17 October 2022.
- Smith, Matthew (27 September 2022). "Mini-budget gets worst reception of any financial statement since Tories took charge in 2010". YouGov. Archived from the original on 27 September 2022.
- "Laura Kuenssberg: State of Chaos. Series 1, Johnson/Truss". BBC Genome. 25 September 2023. Archived from the original on 11 December 2023.
- "The Growth Plan 2022". gov.uk. 23 September 2022. Archived from the original on 23 September 2022.
- "The Rt Hon Elizabeth Truss MP". gov.uk. 6 September 2022. Archived from the original on 6 September 2022.
- "The untold story of Liz Truss's chaotic 49 days in No 10". Times Radio. 6 September 2023. Archived from the original on 7 September 2023.

Parliament of the United Kingdom
Preceded by Christopher Fraser	Member of Parliament for South West Norfolk; 2010–2024	Succeeded by Terry Jermy
Political offices
Preceded by Sarah Teather	Parliamentary Under-Secretary of State for Childcare and Education; 2012–2014	Succeeded by Sam Gyimah
Preceded by Owen Paterson	Secretary of State for Environment, Food and Rural Affairs; 2014–2016	Succeeded by Andrea Leadsom
Preceded by Michael Gove	Secretary of State for Justice; 2016–2017	Succeeded by David Lidington
Preceded by Michael Gove	Lord High Chancellor of Great Britain; 2016–2017	Succeeded by David Lidington
Preceded by David Gauke	Chief Secretary to the Treasury; 2017–2019	Succeeded by Rishi Sunak
Preceded by Liam Fox	Secretary of State for International Trade; 2019–2021	Succeeded by Anne-Marie Trevelyan
Preceded by Liam Fox	President of the Board of Trade; 2019–2021	Succeeded by Anne-Marie Trevelyan
Preceded by Amber Rudd	Minister for Women and Equalities; 2019–2022	Succeeded by Nadhim Zahawi as Minister for Equalities
Preceded by Dominic Raab	Foreign Secretary; 2021–2022	Succeeded by James Cleverly
Preceded by Boris Johnson	Prime Minister of the United Kingdom; 2022	Succeeded by Rishi Sunak
Preceded by Boris Johnson	Minister for the Civil Service; 2022	Succeeded by Rishi Sunak
Preceded by Boris Johnson	First Lord of the Treasury; 2022	Succeeded by Rishi Sunak
Preceded by Boris Johnson	Minister for the Union; 2022	Succeeded by Rishi Sunak
Party political offices
Preceded by Boris Johnson	Leader of the Conservative Party; 2022	Succeeded by Rishi Sunak
Orders of precedence in the United Kingdom
Preceded by Esther McVey	Ladies; Privy Counsellor (sworn July 2014)	Followed by Nicola Sturgeon
