= Britannia Unchained =

2012 book by five British Conservative MPs

- Author: Kwasi Kwarteng; Priti Patel; Dominic Raab; Chris Skidmore; Liz Truss
- Language: English
- Genre: Treatise
- Published: 13 September 2012 Palgrave Macmillan
- Publication place: United Kingdom
- Media type: Print (paperback)
- Pages: 152
- ISBN: 1137032235

Britannia Unchained: Global Lessons for Growth and Prosperity is a political book written by several British Conservative Party MPs and released on 13 September 2012. Its authors present a treatise focusing on the economy of the United Kingdom, arguing that Britain should adopt a different and radical approach to business and economics or risk "an inevitable slide into mediocrity".

The book was written by Kwasi Kwarteng, Priti Patel, Dominic Raab, Chris Skidmore and Liz Truss, five Conservative MPs who were elected in May 2010 and belong to the party's Thatcherite-leaning Free Enterprise Group. The text sets out their vision for the United Kingdom's future as a leading player in the global economy, arguing that Britain needs to adopt a far-reaching form of free market economics, with fewer employment laws and suggesting the United Kingdom should learn lessons from the business and economic practices of other countries, including Canada, Australia and the tiger economies of East Asia like Taiwan, Hong Kong and Singapore.

Four of the five co-authors became part of the cabinet of Prime Minister Boris Johnson in 2019, with co-author Liz Truss becoming Prime Minister on 6 September 2022; she appointed Kwarteng as her Chancellor the same day. Thirty-eight days into his tenure, Kwarteng was removed from his post following the turbulent market reaction to his mini-budget, while Truss resigned as Prime Minister eleven days later. Patel resigned as Home Secretary on 6 September 2022 and Raab as Deputy Prime Minister, Secretary of State for Justice, and Lord Chancellor on 21 April 2023.

== Summary ==
An article written by four of the authors for the ConservativeHome website and published on the day of the book's publication said: "We are convinced that Britain's best days are not behind us. We cannot afford to listen to the siren voices of the statists who are happy for Britain to become a second rate power in Europe, and a third rate power in the world. Decline is not inevitable".

The book asserts that the UK has a "bloated state, high taxes and excessive regulation". It then says:

The British are among the worst idlers in the world. We work among the lowest hours, we retire early and our productivity is poor. Whereas Indian children aspire to be doctors or businessmen, the British are more interested in football and pop music.

It says the UK should "stop indulging in irrelevant debates about sharing the pie between manufacturing and services, the north and the south, women and men".

The content suggests that Britain has policy lessons to learn from a number of other countries which it claims are outperforming the United Kingdom and sets out the areas where the United Kingdom needs to rethink its strategy, citing examples of countries which the authors believe have been successful in these areas. On deficit reduction, the example of Canada during the 1990s is given, where overall spending was reduced by 20% between 1992 and 1997. On education, the authors lament the relatively low number of students who study mathematics at A-Level which they say is 15%, contrasting it with Japan where 85% study the subject at a similar level. In the realm of business and economics, Israel is cited as an example of a country that supports innovation while the United States is given as an example of a nation that supports risk-taking. The willingness of Britain's employees to work hard is compared to that of workers of other countries, with suggestions that a decreasing number of Britain's workers are contributing towards economic growth through which state spending is enabled to be maintained. It is asserted that this undermines the United Kingdom's competitiveness.

== Reception ==
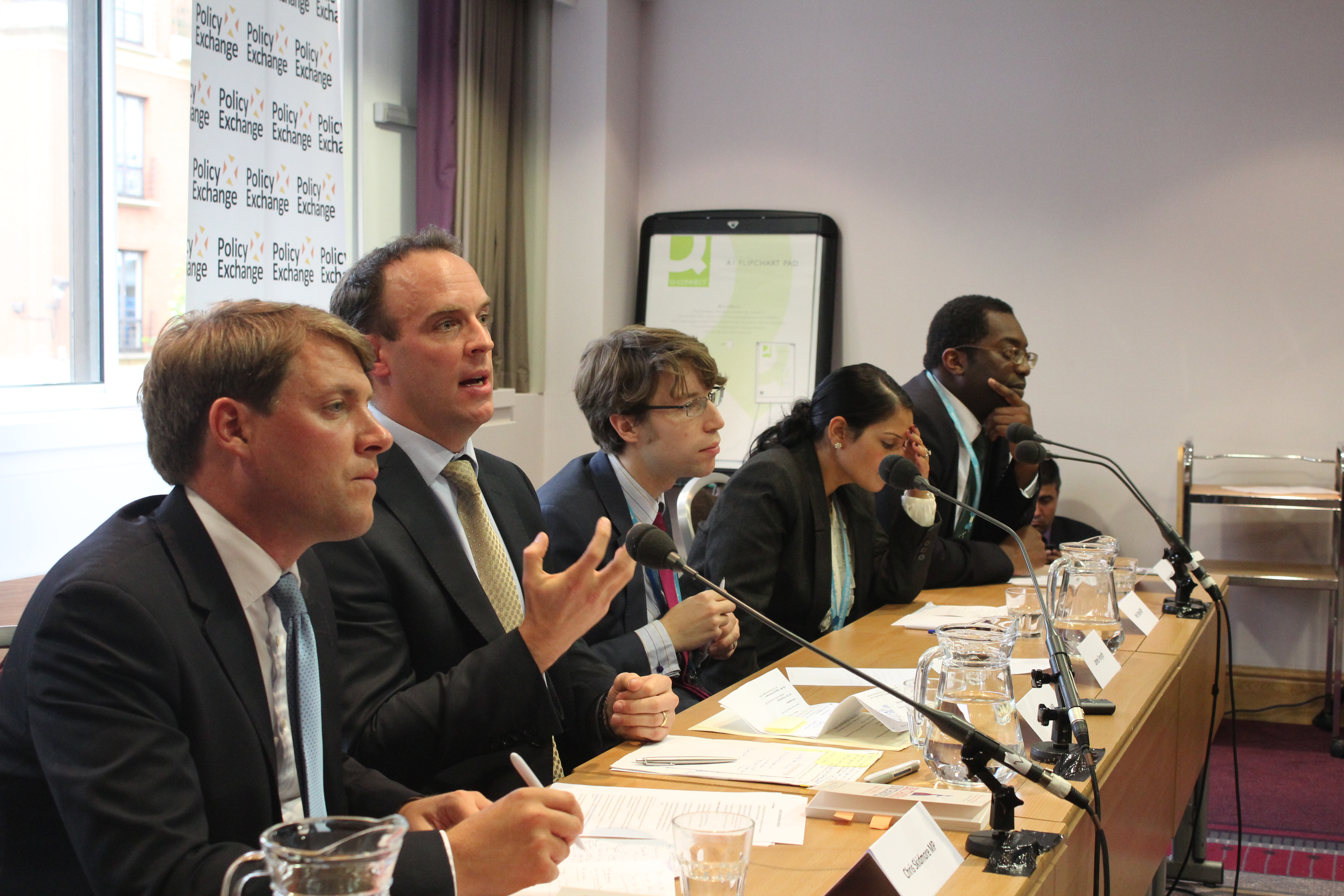
2012 panel discussion promoting the book's launch

The book caused controversy in August 2012 after a short quotation appeared in London's Evening Standard which accused British workers of laziness and lagging behind their Asian counterparts. The comments were criticised by union leaders, among them the General Secretary of the Trades Union Congress Brendan Barber: "The problem with the UK economy is not its workers, but a severe lack of jobs". The Labour Party urged British Prime Minister and Conservative leader David Cameron to distance himself from the views and the Shadow Secretary of State for Business Chuka Umunna commented: "First they blame British businesses for their economic failures and now they blame the people who work within them, showing how out of touch the Tory party has become".

Writing for the New Statesman, Jonathan Portes criticised the accuracy of the content, saying the book contained "factual errors" and evidence of "slipshod research" by the authors:

"The authors of Britannia Unchained – five Conservative MPs including Elizabeth Truss and Dominic Raab – argue that Britons are 'idlers . . . obsessed with the idea of the gentleman amateur'. Sadly, so far the reaction to the book has proved their point. They've had headlines in the Daily Mail and The Telegraph and The Guardian has marked them out as the young Tories to watch. Job done. Yet they've done it without doing any serious research, let alone thinking about what that research might mean. They have joined the political version of celebrity culture – the same culture that they argue, to some extent compellingly, makes Britons believe they can get on without doing any hard work".

The book received renewed attention under the Johnson government, which had all five co-authors as ministers and three of them occupying two of the Great Offices of State. Several writers argued that the book was indicative of Boris Johnson's objectives for Brexit and wider reforms.

The book received even greater attention following the appointment of Truss as Prime Minister and Kwarteng as Chancellor and the financial crisis triggered following the Truss government's September 2022 United Kingdom mini-budget. Kwarteng was dismissed as Chancellor by Truss on 14 October after only 38 days in the position. Truss resigned as prime minister only a few days later, making her resignation announcement on 20 October; her last day in office was 25 October.
