= Free Enterprise Group =

Grouping of Thatcherite British Conservative Members of Parliament

The Free Enterprise Group was a grouping of Thatcherite British Conservative Party Members of Parliament founded in mid-2011 by Liz Truss that existed until 2022. The book Britannia Unchained was written by members of the group. The group has been associated with the Institute of Economic Affairs. The group was effectively succeeded by the Free Market Forum, also affiliated with the IEA.

MPs listed as supporters of this group have included:

- Steve Baker
- Karen Bradley*
- Robert Buckland
- Aidan Burley
- Alun Cairns
- Thérèse Coffey
- Charlie Elphicke
- George Eustice
- Mark Garnier*
- John Glen*
- Ben Gummer
- Sam Gyimah
- Matthew Hancock
- Richard Harrington
- Chris Heaton-Harris
- Margot James
- Sajid Javid
- Chris Kelly
- Kwasi Kwarteng
- Andrea Leadsom
- Brandon Lewis
- Brooks Newmark
- Jesse Norman*
- Guy Opperman
- Priti Patel*
- Mark Pritchard*
- Dominic Raab
- David Rutley
- Laura Sandys
- Chris Skidmore
- Julian Smith*
- Rory Stewart
- Liz Truss
- Andrew Tyrie
- Mike Weatherley
- Nadhim Zahawi

*Still an MP following the general election held on 4th July 2024

== See also ==
- Popular Conservatism, another Truss-supporting vehicle
