= Second May ministry =

Government of the United Kingdom (2017–2019)

- Cabinet of the United Kingdom
- 2017–2019
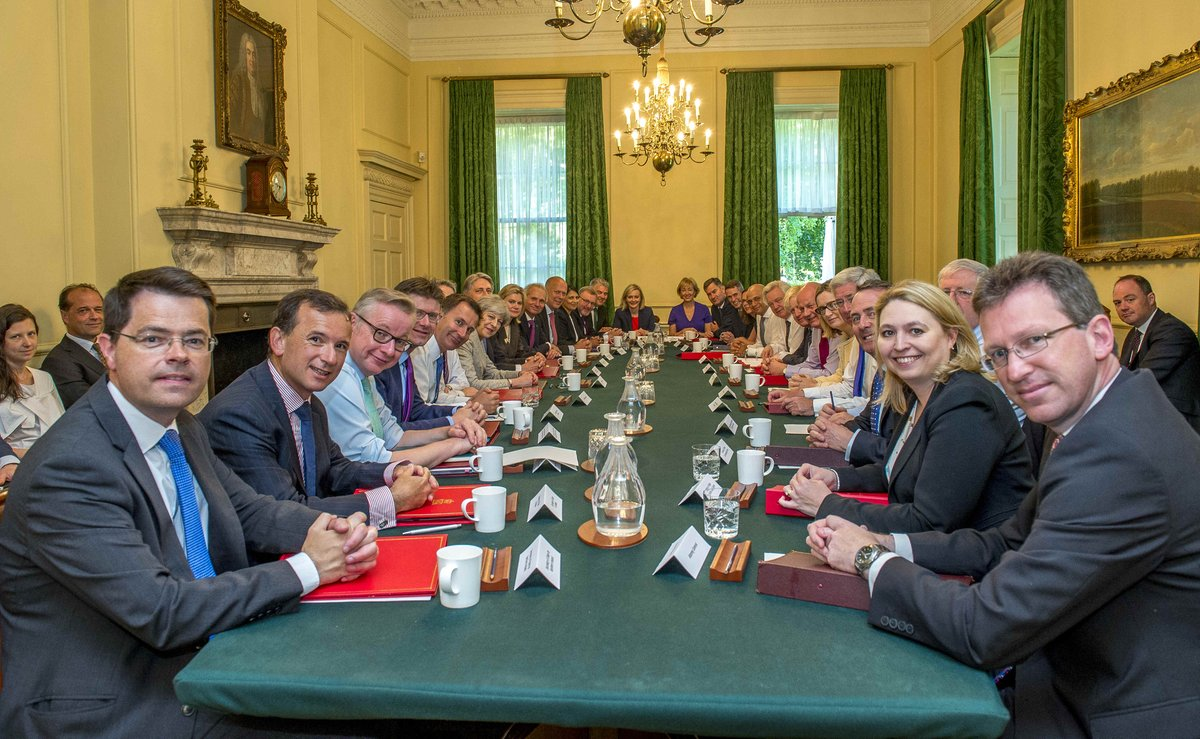
- The May Cabinet's first meeting after the 2017 general election
- Date formed: 11 June 2017
- Date dissolved: 24 July 2019

People and organisations
- Monarch: Elizabeth II
- Prime Minister: Theresa May
- Prime Minister's history: Premiership of Theresa May
- First Secretary: Damian Green (2017)
- Ministers removed: 60 resignations (in total); 16 cabinet members resigned
- Member party: Conservative Party
- Status in legislature: Minority with DUP confidence & supply
- Opposition cabinet: Corbyn shadow cabinet
- Opposition party: Labour Party
- Opposition leader: Jeremy Corbyn

History
- Incoming formation: 2017 United Kingdom government formation
- Outgoing formation: 2019 Conservative leadership election
- Election: 2017 general election
- Legislature terms: 2017–2019
- Budgets: November 2017 budget; 2018 budget
- Predecessor: First May ministry
- Successor: First Johnson ministry

The second May ministry was formed on 11 June 2017 after Theresa May returned to office following the June 2017 snap general election. The election resulted in a hung parliament with the Conservative Party losing its governing majority in the House of Commons. On 9 June 2017, May announced her intention to form a Conservative minority government, reliant on the confidence and supply of the Democratic Unionist Party; a finalised agreement between the two parties was signed and published on 26 June 2017.

May announced on 24 May 2019 that she would resign as Leader of the Conservative Party on 7 June. She remained in office as caretaker prime minister during the resulting Conservative Party leadership election, before officially resigning on 24 July, after which she was succeeded as prime minister by former Foreign Secretary Boris Johnson.

== History ==
The 2017 snap election resulted in a hung parliament, with the Conservative Party holding the most seats in the House of Commons, but without an overall majority. The Democratic Unionist Party (DUP) had suggested that it would be able to provide a coalition or confidence and supply arrangement depending on negotiations. Theresa May, the incumbent Conservative prime minister, announced her intention on 9 June 2017 to form a new minority government with support from the DUP. Both parties indicated that this support would be in the form of a confidence and supply agreement, rather than a formal coalition.

On 10 June, a survey of 1,500 Conservative Home readers found that almost two-thirds of Conservative Party members wanted Theresa May to resign. A YouGov poll of 1,720 adults for The Sunday Times had 48% saying Theresa May should resign, with 38% against. A Survation poll of 1,036 adults online for The Mail on Sunday had 49% of people wanting her resignation, with 38% against.

On 10 June 2017, 10 Downing Street issued a statement saying that a Conservative–DUP agreement had been reached in principle. A few hours later, the statement was retracted when it was said that it had been "issued in error" and that talks between the two parties were still ongoing. Former Prime Minister John Major was concerned that a deal between the Conservatives and DUP could endanger the Northern Ireland peace process.

On 11 June 2017, former Chancellor of the Exchequer George Osborne described May as a "dead woman walking". The Secretary of State for Justice, David Lidington, dismissed speculation about May's future as "gossipy stories". Senior Labour politicians stated that they planned to challenge the Conservative minority government early and to put forward alternative policies in their reply to the Queen's Speech. Jeremy Corbyn said he believed there was a majority in parliament for many issues on which Labour "is sympathetic", giving as examples the repeal of the Under-occupancy penalty ('bedroom tax'), and maintaining the triple lock on pensions and the winter fuel allowance. In an interview on 11 June, Corbyn stated that he expected another election to be held within a year.

Michael Gove said that the minority government would probably reduce austerity and increase spending on public services. Stephen Bush of the New Statesman also expected less austerity, saying that if voters saw continued austerity in England, Scotland and Wales while the government spent generously in Northern Ireland to maintain the pact with the DUP then the Conservatives would become more unpopular. A 1% pay cap on public sector workers was under review according to 10 Downing Street. and increasing numbers of high ranking Conservatives wanted to end it.

On the afternoon of 11 June, Theresa May finalised the composition of her cabinet. The senior positions of Chancellor, Foreign Secretary and Home Secretary, as well as the Secretary of State for Exiting the EU, had already been confirmed on 9 June with all four incumbents staying in office. The reshuffle saw prominent Brexiteer MPs, such as Boris Johnson and David Davis, retain their roles, but also resulted in the promotion of Damian Green and David Gauke, both of whom had supported the remain side during the EU referendum. Junior ministerial roles were allocated the following day, with a full list of new ministerial and government appointments confirmed on 12 June.

On 3 July 2017, polls suggested that May's popularity had dropped drastically since the election on 8 June. 60% of voters viewed May less favourably than they had during the election, and she had a net disapproval rating of 20%: 31% approved her leadership, while 51% disapproved. By 7 July, YouGov gave Labour an eight-point lead over the Conservatives (46% to 38%). A New Statesman article argued that a factor in this lead was Office for National Statistics figures showing household disposable incomes falling faster than at any time since 2011.

May reshuffled her cabinet on 8–9 January 2018. Amidst the rejection in three successive votes by parliament of the Brexit withdrawal agreement, she negotiated to leave the European Union. She announced on 24 May 2019 that she would resign as leader of the Conservative Party on 7 June, though she continued to serve as a caretaker until Boris Johnson was elected leader and asked to form a new government on 24 July 2019.

Lord Faulks maintains he tried to introduce a public register of overseas property owners to prevent money laundering in the UK. Faulks alleges May's government put pressure on him to withdraw the measures claiming it would be addressed in future legislation. Faulks maintains no such legislation happened. Faulks said, “I was obviously misled because nothing has subsequently happened. I can only think a deluded desire to protect the City of London has led to all these delays. (...) Quite frankly, I was leant on. I was leant on by No 10 Downing Street and summoned to a meeting of officials from all sorts of different departments, who told me it was very unfortunate that I was going to do this because the matter was in hand.”

== Cabinets ==
=== June 2017 – January 2018 ===
First Cabinet of Second May Ministry
Portfolio	Portrait	Minister	Term
Cabinet ministers
Prime Minister; First Lord of the Treasury; Minister for the Civil Service; Commonwealth Chair-in-Office (2018–2019)		Theresa May	2016–2019
First Secretary of State; Minister for the Cabinet Office		Damian Green	2017
Chancellor of the Exchequer; Second Lord of the Treasury		Philip Hammond	2016–2019
Secretary of State for the Home Department		Amber Rudd	2016–2018
Secretary of State for Foreign and Commonwealth Affairs		Boris Johnson	2016–2018
Secretary of State for Exiting the European Union		David Davis	2016–2018
Secretary of State for Defence		Sir; Michael Fallon	2014–2017
Secretary of State for Defence		Gavin Williamson	2017–2019
Secretary of State for Health		Jeremy Hunt	2012–2018
Lord High Chancellor of Great Britain; Secretary of State for Justice		David Lidington	2017–2018
Secretary of State for Education; Minister for Women and Equalities		Justine Greening	2016–2018
Secretary of State for International Trade; President of the Board of Trade		Liam Fox	2016–2019
Secretary of State for Business, Energy and Industrial Strategy		Greg Clark	2016–2019
Secretary of State for Environment, Food and Rural Affairs		Michael Gove	2017–2019
Secretary of State for Transport		Chris Grayling	2016–2019
Secretary of State for Communities and Local Government		Sajid Javid	2016–2018
Leader of the House of Lords; Lord Keeper of the Privy Seal		Natalie Evans; Baroness Evans of Bowes Park	2016–2022
Secretary of State for Scotland		David Mundell	2015–2019
Secretary of State for Wales		Alun Cairns	2016–2019
Secretary of State for Northern Ireland		James Brokenshire	2016–2018
Secretary of State for International Development		Priti Patel	2016–2017
Secretary of State for International Development		Penny Mordaunt	2017–2019
Secretary of State for Digital, Culture, Media and Sport		Karen Bradley	2016–2018
Secretary of State for Work and Pensions		David Gauke	2017–2018
Chancellor of the Duchy of Lancaster; Chairman of the Conservative Party (unpaid)		Sir; Patrick McLoughlin	2016–2018
Also attending cabinet meetings
Leader of the House of Commons; Lord President of the Council		Andrea Leadsom	2017–2019
Chief Secretary to the Treasury		Liz Truss	2017–2019
Chief Whip in the House of Commons; Parliamentary Secretary to the Treasury		Gavin Williamson	2016–2017
Chief Whip in the House of Commons; Parliamentary Secretary to the Treasury		Julian Smith	2017–2019
Attorney General		Jeremy Wright	2014–2018
Minister of State for Immigration		Brandon Lewis	2017–2018
Minister of State for Employment		Damian Hinds	2016–2018

==== Changes ====
- Following allegations of sexual misconduct, Michael Fallon resigned from his post of Defence Secretary on 1 November 2017. He was replaced by Gavin Williamson. Williamson was replaced as Chief Whip by Julian Smith.
- After it was revealed that Priti Patel held unsanctioned meetings with Israeli politicians and officials whilst on a family holiday, thereby violating the Ministerial Code, she was forced to resign from her post of International Development Secretary on 8 November 2017. She was replaced by Penny Mordaunt.
- Following an inquiry that found that he had violated the Ministerial Code, Damian Green resigned from his post on 20 December 2017.

=== January 2018 – July 2019 ===
Second Cabinet of Second May Ministry
Portfolio	Portrait	Minister	Term
Cabinet ministers
Prime Minister; First Lord of the Treasury; Minister for the Civil Service		Theresa May	2016–2019
Chancellor of the Duchy of Lancaster; Minister for the Cabinet Office		David Lidington	2018–2019
Chancellor of the Exchequer; Second Lord of the Treasury		Philip Hammond	2016–2019
Secretary of State for the Home Department		Amber Rudd	2016–2018
Secretary of State for the Home Department		Sajid Javid	2018–2019
Secretary of State for Foreign and Commonwealth Affairs		Boris Johnson	2016–2018
Secretary of State for Foreign and Commonwealth Affairs		Jeremy Hunt	2018–2019
Secretary of State for Exiting the European Union		David Davis	2016–2018
Secretary of State for Exiting the European Union		Dominic Raab	2018
Secretary of State for Exiting the European Union		Steve Barclay	2018–2020
Secretary of State for Defence		Gavin Williamson	2017–2019
Secretary of State for Defence		Penny Mordaunt	2019
Secretary of State for Justice; Lord High Chancellor of Great Britain		David Gauke	2018–2019
Secretary of State for Health and Social Care		Jeremy Hunt	2012–2018
Secretary of State for Health and Social Care		Matt Hancock	2018–2021
Secretary of State for Education		Damian Hinds	2018–2019
Secretary of State for International Trade; President of the Board of Trade		Liam Fox	2016–2019
Secretary of State for Business, Energy and Industrial Strategy		Greg Clark	2016–2019
Secretary of State for Environment, Food and Rural Affairs		Michael Gove	2017–2019
Secretary of State for Transport		Chris Grayling	2016–2019
Secretary of State for Housing, Communities and Local Government		Sajid Javid	2016–2018
Secretary of State for Housing, Communities and Local Government		James Brokenshire	2018–2019
Leader of the House of Lords; Lord Keeper of the Privy Seal		Natalie Evans; Baroness Evans of Bowes Park	2016–2019
Secretary of State for Scotland		David Mundell	2015–2019
Secretary of State for Wales		Alun Cairns	2016–2019
Secretary of State for Northern Ireland		Karen Bradley	2018–2019
Secretary of State for International Development		Penny Mordaunt	2017–2019
Secretary of State for International Development		Rory Stewart	2019
Secretary of State for Digital, Culture, Media and Sport		Matt Hancock	2018
Secretary of State for Digital, Culture, Media and Sport		Jeremy Wright	2018–2019
Secretary of State for Work and Pensions		Esther McVey	2018
Secretary of State for Work and Pensions		Amber Rudd	2018–2019
Chairman of the Conservative Party; Minister without portfolio (unpaid)		Brandon Lewis	2018–2019
Also attending cabinet meetings
Leader of the House of Commons; Lord President of the Council		Andrea Leadsom	2017–2019
Leader of the House of Commons; Lord President of the Council		Mel Stride	2019
Chief Secretary to the Treasury		Liz Truss	2017–2019
Chief Whip in the House of Commons; Parliamentary Secretary to the Treasury		Julian Smith	2017–2019
Attorney General		Jeremy Wright	2014–2018
Attorney General		Geoffrey Cox	2018–2019
Minister of State for Immigration		Caroline Nokes	2018–2019
Minister of State for Energy & Clean Growth		Claire Perry	2017–2019

==== Changes ====
- Following a scandal about immigrant removal targets, Amber Rudd resigned from her post of Home Secretary on 29 April 2018. She was replaced by Sajid Javid, whose former post of Housing Secretary was filled by James Brokenshire.
- Brexit Secretary David Davis resigned from his post on 8 July 2018. In his letter of resignation, he cited dissatisfaction with the 6 July "Chequers Agreement” plan for Britain's relationship with the European Union after exit. Minister of State for Housing and Planning Dominic Raab was appointed to fill the vacancy left by Davis the next day. Kit Malthouse replaced Raab as Housing Minister.
- Foreign Secretary Boris Johnson resigned from his post on 9 July 2018, reportedly also over dissatisfaction with the Chequers Agreement. Health Secretary Jeremy Hunt was appointed to replace Johnson, whilst Hunt's former post was filled by Culture Secretary Matthew Hancock. Attorney General Jeremy Wright replaced Hancock as Culture Secretary, and backbencher Geoffrey Cox replaced Wright as Attorney General.
- Brexit Secretary Dominic Raab and Work and Pensions Secretary Esther McVey resigned on 15 November 2018 following the publication of the draft EU withdrawal agreement the previous day. On 16 November, Amber Rudd was invited to return to cabinet to fill the post of Work and Pensions Secretary, whilst Steve Barclay was appointed as Brexit Secretary.
- Following an inquiry into a leak of information from a meeting of the National Security Council, Defence Secretary Gavin Williamson was removed from his post on 1 May 2019. He was replaced by Penny Mordaunt, with her former post of International Development Secretary filled by Rory Stewart, who was replaced as Prisons Minister by Robert Buckland, himself being replaced as Solicitor General by Lucy Frazer.
- Andrea Leadsom resigned from her post of Leader of the House of Commons on 22 May 2019. She was replaced by treasury minister Mel Stride, whose post was filled by Minister of State for Transport Jesse Norman. His post was filled by Arts minister Michael Ellis, and his post was filled by Rebecca Pow.

== List of ministers ==
Minister in the House of Commons	Minister in the House of Lords
Ministers that attend cabinet are listed **in bold**

=== Prime Minister, the Cabinet Office and non-Departmental ministers ===
Cabinet Office
Post	Minister	Term
Prime Minister of the United Kingdom; First Lord of the Treasury; Minister for the Civil Service	**Theresa May**	July 2016 – July 2019
Minister for the Cabinet Office	Damian Green	June–December 2017
Minister for the Cabinet Office	**David Lidington** (also Chancellor of the Duchy of Lancaster)	January 2018 – July 2019
Chancellor of the Duchy of Lancaster	Patrick McLoughlin (unpaid; also Chairman of the Conservative Party)	July 2016 – January 2018
Chancellor of the Duchy of Lancaster	**David Lidington** (also Minister for the Cabinet Office)	January 2018 – July 2019
Parliamentary Secretary; Minister for the Constitution	Chris Skidmore	July 2016 – January 2018
Parliamentary Secretary; Minister for the Constitution	Chloe Smith	January 2018 – July 2019
Parliamentary Secretary; Minister for the Constitution	Kevin Foster (interim) (unpaid; maternity cover for Chloe Smith; also Parliamentary Under-Secretary of State at the Wales Office, and an Assistant Whip)	April–July 2019
Parliamentary Secretary; Minister for Government Resilience and Efficiency	Caroline Nokes	June 2017 – January 2018
Parliamentary Secretary; Minister for Implementation	Oliver Dowden	January 2018 – July 2019

Non-Departmental ministers
Minister without Portfolio	**Brandon Lewis** (unpaid; also Chairman of the Conservative Party)	January 2018 - July 2019

=== Departments of state ===
Business, Energy and Industrial Strategy
Secretary of State for Business, Energy and Industrial Strategy	**Dr Greg Clark**	July 2016 – July 2019
Minister of State for Climate Change and Industry	Claire Perry	June 2017 – January 2018
Minister of State for Energy and Clean Growth	**Claire Perry**	January 2018 – July 2019
Minister of State for Energy and Clean Growth	Chris Skidmore MP (interim) (cover for Claire Perry while on Leave of Absence)	May–July 2019
Minister of State for Universities, Science, Research and Innovation (jointly with Education)	Jo Johnson	May 2015 – January 2018
Minister of State for Universities, Science, Research and Innovation (jointly with Education)	Sam Gyimah	January–November 2018
Minister of State for Universities, Science, Research and Innovation (jointly with Education)	Chris Skidmore	December 2018 – July 2019
Parliamentary Under-Secretary of State; Minister for Small Business, Consumers and Corporate Responsibility	Margot James	July 2016 – January 2018
Parliamentary Under-Secretary of State; Minister for Small Business, Consumers and Corporate Responsibility	Andrew Griffiths	January–July 2018
Parliamentary Under-Secretary of State; Minister for Small Business, Consumers and Corporate Responsibility	Kelly Tolhurst	July 2018 – July 2019
Parliamentary Under-Secretary of State; Minister for Industry and Energy	Richard Harrington	June 2017 – January 2018
Parliamentary Under-Secretary of State; Minister for Business and Industry	Richard Harrington	January 2018 – March 2019
Parliamentary Under-Secretary of State; Minister for Business and Industry	Andrew Stephenson	April–July 2019
Parliamentary Under-Secretary of State; Minister for the Northern Powerhouse and Local Growth (jointly with Housing, Communities & Local Government)	Jake Berry	June–July 2019
Parliamentary Under-Secretary of State	David Prior, Baron Prior of Brampton	December 2016 – October 2017
Parliamentary Under-Secretary of State	Oliver Eden, 8th Baron Henley	October 2017 – July 2019

Digital, Culture, Media and Sport
Secretary of State for Digital, Culture, Media and Sport	Karen Bradley	July 2016 – January 2018
Secretary of State for Digital, Culture, Media and Sport	Matt Hancock	January–July 2018
Secretary of State for Digital, Culture, Media and Sport	**Jeremy Wright**	July 2018 – July 2019
Minister of State for Digital and Creative Industries	Matthew Hancock	July 2016 – January 2018
Minister of State for Digital and Creative Industries	Margot James MP	January 2018 – 18 July 2019
Parliamentary Under-Secretary of State for Sport and Civil Society	Tracey Crouch	May 2015 – November 2018
Parliamentary Under-Secretary of State for Sport and Civil Society	Mims Davies	November 2018 – July 2019
Parliamentary Under-Secretary of State for Arts, Heritage and Tourism	John Glen	June 2017 – January 2018
Parliamentary Under-Secretary of State for Arts, Heritage and Tourism	Michael Ellis	January 2018 – May 2019
Parliamentary Under-Secretary of State for Arts, Heritage and Tourism	Rebecca Pow	May–July 2019
Parliamentary Under-Secretary of State	Henry Ashton, 4th Baron Ashton of Hyde	July 2016 – July 2019

Defence
Secretary of State for Defence	Sir Michael Fallon	July 2014 – November 2017
Secretary of State for Defence	Gavin Williamson	November 2017 – May 2019
Secretary of State for Defence	**Penny Mordaunt** (also Minister for Women and Equalities since Apr 2018)	May–July 2019
Minister of State for the Armed Forces	Col Mark Lancaster	June 2017 – July 2019
Minister of State for Defence	Frederick Curzon, 7th Earl Howe (unpaid; also Deputy Lords Leader)	May 2015 – July 2019
Parliamentary Under-Secretary of State; Minister for Defence Procurement	Harriett Baldwin	July 2016 – January 2018
Parliamentary Under-Secretary of State; Minister for Defence Procurement	Guto Bebb	January–July 2018
Parliamentary Under-Secretary of State; Minister for Defence Procurement	Stuart Andrew	July 2018 – July 2019
Parliamentary Under-Secretary of State; Minister for Defence Veterans, Reserves and Personnel	Capt Tobias Ellwood	June 2017 – July 2019

Education
Secretary of State for Education	Justine Greening (also Minister for Women & Equalities)	July 2016 – January 2018
Secretary of State for Education	**Damian Hinds**	January 2018 – July 2019
Minister of State for School Standards	Nick Gibb (also Minister for Equalities at the GEO until Jan 2018)	July 2014 – July 2019
Minister of State for Universities, Science, Research and Innovation (jointly with BEIS)	Jo Johnson	May 2015 – January 2018
Minister of State for Universities, Science, Research and Innovation (jointly with BEIS)	Sam Gyimah	January–November 2018
Minister of State for Universities, Science, Research and Innovation (jointly with BEIS)	Chris Skidmore	December 2018 – July 2019
Minister of State for Apprenticeships and Skills	Anne Milton (also Minister for Women at the GEO until Jan 2018)	June 2017 – 23 July 2019
Minister of State for Vulnerable Children and Families	Robert Goodwill	June 2017 – January 2018
Parliamentary Under-Secretary of State for Children and Families	Nadhim Zahawi	January 2018 – July 2019
Parliamentary Under-Secretary of State for the School System	John Nash, Baron Nash (unpaid)	October 2013 – September 2017
Parliamentary Under-Secretary of State for the School System	Theodore Agnew, Baron Agnew of Oulton (unpaid)	September 2017 – July 2019

Environment, Food and Rural Affairs
Secretary of State for Environment, Food and Rural Affairs	**Michael Gove**	June 2017 – July 2019
Minister of State for Agriculture, Fisheries and Food	George Eustice	October 2013 – February 2019
Minister of State for Agriculture, Fisheries and Food	Robert Goodwill	March–July 2019
Parliamentary Under-Secretary of State for the Environment and Rural Life Opportunities	Thérèse Coffey	July 2016 – July 2018
Parliamentary Under-Secretary of State for the Environment	Thérèse Coffey	July 2018 – July 2019
Parliamentary Under-Secretary of State for the Environment	David Rutley (interim) (unpaid; cover for Thérèse Coffey; also a Whip)	May–July 2018
Parliamentary Under-Secretary of State for Rural Affairs and Biosecurity	John Gardiner, Baron Gardiner of Kimble	July 2016 – July 2019
Parliamentary Under-Secretary of State for Food and Animal Welfare	David Rutley (also a Whip)	September 2018 – July 2019

Government Equalities Office
Minister for Women and Equalities	Justine Greening (also Education Secretary)	July 2016 – January 2018
Minister for Women and Equalities	Amber Rudd (also Home Secretary)	January–April 2018
Minister for Women and Equalities	**Penny Mordaunt** (also International Development Secretary to May 2019, Defence Secretary from May 2019)	April 2018 – July 2019
Parliamentary Under-Secretary of State; Minister for Women; (jointly with International Development since Jul 2018)	Anne Milton (also Minister of State for Apprenticeships and Skills at DfE)	June 2017 – January 2018
Parliamentary Under-Secretary of State; Minister for Women; (jointly with International Development since Jul 2018)	Victoria Atkins (also Parliamentary Under-Secretary of State for Crime, Safeguarding and Vulnerability at the Home Office)	January 2018 – July 2019
Parliamentary Under-Secretary of State; Minister for Equalities; (jointly with International Development since Jul 2018)	Nick Gibb (also Minister of State for School Standards at DfE)	June 2017 – January 2018
Parliamentary Under-Secretary of State; Minister for Equalities; (jointly with International Development since Jul 2018)	Susan Williams, Baroness Williams of Trafford (also Minister of State for Countering Extremism at the Home Office)	January 2018 – July 2019

Exiting the European Union
Secretary of State for Exiting the European Union	David Davis	July 2016 – July 2018
Secretary of State for Exiting the European Union	Dominic Raab	July–November 2018
Secretary of State for Exiting the European Union	**Steve Barclay**	November 2018 – July 2019
Minister of State	Joyce Anelay, Baroness Anelay of St John's	June–October 2017
Minister of State	Martin Callanan, Baron Callanan	October 2017 – July 2019
Parliamentary Under-Secretary of State	Robin Walker	July 2016 – July 2019
Parliamentary Under-Secretary of State	Steve Baker	June 2017 – July 2018
Parliamentary Under-Secretary of State	Christopher Heaton-Harris	July 2018 – April 2019
Parliamentary Under-Secretary of State	James Cleverly	April–July 2019
Parliamentary Under-Secretary of State	Suella Braverman	January–November 2018
Parliamentary Under-Secretary of State	Kwasi Kwarteng	November 2018 – July 2019

Foreign and Commonwealth Affairs
Secretary of State for Foreign and Commonwealth Affairs	Boris Johnson	July 2016 – July 2018
Secretary of State for Foreign and Commonwealth Affairs	**Jeremy Hunt**	July 2018 – July 2019
Minister of State for Europe and the Americas	Alan Duncan	July 2016 – 22 July 2019
Minister of State for the Middle East	Alistair Burt (also Minister of State for International Development at DFID)	June 2017 – March 2019
Minister of State for the Middle East	Mark Field (Interim)	March–May 2019
Minister of State for the Middle East	Andrew Murrison (also Minister of State for International Development at DFID)	May–July 2019
Minister of State for the Commonwealth & The UN	Tariq Ahmad, Baron Ahmad of Wimbledon	June 2017 – July 2019
Minister of State for Asia & The Pacific	Mark Field (unpaid since Jan 2018, Suspended from 21 June 2019)	June 2017 – July 2019
Minister of State for Africa	Rory Stewart (also Minister of State for International Development at DFID)	June 2017 – January 2018
Minister of State for Africa	Harriett Baldwin (also Minister of State at DFID)	January 2018 – July 2019

Health and Social Care Health (until January 2018)
Secretary of State for Health and Social Care	Jeremy Hunt	September 2012 – July 2018
Secretary of State for Health and Social Care	**Matthew Hancock**	July 2018 – June 2021
Minister of State for Health	Philip Dunne	July 2016 – January 2018
Minister of State for Health	Steve Barclay	January–November 2018
Minister of State for Health	Stephen Hammond	November 2018 – July 2019
Minister of State for Care	Caroline Dinenage	January 2018 – July 2019
Parliamentary Under-Secretary of State for Mental Health and Inequalities	Jackie Doyle-Price	June 2017 – July 2019
Parliamentary Under-Secretary of State for Public Health and Primary Care	Steve Brine	June 2017 – March 2019
Parliamentary Under-Secretary of State for Public Health and Primary Care	Seema Kennedy	April–July 2019
Parliamentary Under-Secretary of State	James O'Shaughnessy, Baron O'Shaughnessy	December 2016 – December 2018
Parliamentary Under-Secretary of State	Nicola Blackwood, Baroness Blackwood of North Oxford	January–July 2019

Home Office
Secretary of State for the Home Department	Amber Rudd (also Minister for Women and Equalities from Jan 2018)	July 2016 – April 2018
Secretary of State for the Home Department	**Sajid Javid**	April 2018 – July 2019
Minister of State for Immigration	Brandon Lewis	July 2016 – January 2018
Minister of State for Immigration	**Caroline Nokes**	January 2018 – July 2019
Minister of State for Security and Economic Crime	Ben Wallace	July 2016 – July 2019
Minister of State for Policing and the Fire Service; Minister for London (from November 2018)	Nick Hurd	June 2017 – July 2019
Minister of State for Countering Extremism	Susan Williams, Baroness Williams of Trafford (also Minister for Equalities at the GEO since Jan 2018)	July 2016 – July 2019
Parliamentary Under-Secretary of State for Crime, Safeguarding and Vulnerability	Sarah Newton	July 2016 – November 2017
Parliamentary Under-Secretary of State for Crime, Safeguarding and Vulnerability	Victoria Atkins (also Minister for Women at the GEO since Jan 2018)	November 2017 – July 2019

Housing, Communities & Local Government Communities and Local Government (until January 2018)
Secretary of State for Communities and Local Government; Ministerial Champion for the Midlands Engine	Sajid Javid	July 2016 – January 2018
Secretary of State for Housing, Communities and Local Government	Sajid Javid	January–April 2018
Secretary of State for Housing, Communities and Local Government	**James Brokenshire**	April 2018 – July 2019
Minister of State for Housing and Planning	Alok Sharma	June 2017 – January 2018
Minister of State for Housing and Planning	Dominic Raab	January–July 2018
Minister of State for Housing and Planning	Kit Malthouse	July 2018 – July 2019
Parliamentary Under-Secretary of State; Minister for Local Government	Marcus Jones	May 2015 – January 2018
Parliamentary Under-Secretary of State; Minister for Local Government	Rishi Sunak	January 2018 – July 2019
Parliamentary Under-Secretary of State; Minister for the Northern Powerhouse and Local Growth (jointly with Business, Energy and Industrial Strategy from June 2019)	Jake Berry	June 2017 – July 2019
Parliamentary Under-Secretary of State; Minister for Housing and Homelessness	Heather Wheeler	January 2018 – July 2019
Parliamentary Under-Secretary of State	Nigel Adams (unpaid; standing in for Heather Wheeler; also a Whip)	May–November 2018
Parliamentary Under-Secretary of State; Minister for Faith	Nick Bourne, Baron Bourne of Aberystwyth (unpaid; also Parliamentary Under-Secretary of State at the Northern Ireland Office until Oct 2017, and at the Wales Office since)	July 2016 – July 2019

International Development
Secretary of State for International Development	Priti Patel	July 2016 – November 2017
Secretary of State for International Development	Penny Mordaunt (also Minister for Women and Equalities since Apr 2018)	November 2017 – May 2019
Secretary of State for International Development	**Rory Stewart**	May 2019 – July 2019
Minister of State for International Development	Rory Stewart (also Minister of State for Africa at the FCO)	July 2016 – January 2018
Minister of State for International Development	Alistair Burt (also Minister of State for the Middle East at the FCO)	June 2017 – March 2019
Minister of State for International Development	Andrew Murrison (also Minister of State for the Middle East at the FCO)	May–July 2019
Minister of State	Harriett Baldwin (also Minister of State for Africa at the FCO)	January 2018 – July 2019
Minister of State for International Development	Michael Bates, Baron Bates (unpaid)	October 2016 – April 2019
Parliamentary Under-Secretary of State for International Development	Liz Sugg, Baroness Sugg (also a Lords Whip)	April–July 2019
Parliamentary Under-Secretary of State; Minister for Women; (jointly with the GEO, at International Development since Jul 2018)	Victoria Atkins (also Parliamentary Under-Secretary of State for Crime, Safeguarding and Vulnerability at the Home Office)	January 2018 – July 2019
Parliamentary Under-Secretary of State; Minister for Equalities; (jointly with the GEO, at International Development since Jul 2018)	Susan Williams, Baroness Williams of Trafford (also Minister of State for Countering Extremism at the Home Office)	January 2018 – July 2019

International Trade
Secretary of State for International Trade; President of the Board of Trade	**Liam Fox**	July 2016 – July 2019
Minister of State for Trade and Investment; Minister for London (from June 2017)	Greg Hands	July 2016 – September 2017
Minister of State for Trade Policy; Minister for London (until January 2018)	Greg Hands	September 2017 – June 2018
Minister of State for Trade Policy	George Hollingbery	June 2018 – July 2019
Minister of State for Trade Policy	Mark Price, Baron Price	April 2016 – September 2017
Parliamentary Under-Secretary of State	Mark Garnier	July 2016 – September 2017
Minister for Investment	Mark Garnier	September–October 2017
Parliamentary Under-Secretary of State for Investment	Mark Garnier	October 2017 – January 2018
Minister of State for Trade and Export Promotion	Rona Fairhead, Baroness Fairhead (unpaid since Jan 2018)	October 2017 – May 2019
Minister for Investment	Graham Stuart	January 2018 – July 2019

Justice
Lord High Chancellor of Great Britain; Secretary of State for Justice	David Lidington	June 2017 – January 2018
Lord High Chancellor of Great Britain; Secretary of State for Justice	**David Gauke**	January 2018 – July 2019
Minister of State for Courts and Justice	Dominic Raab	June 2017 – January 2018
Minister of State for Prisons	Rory Stewart	January 2018 – May 2019
Minister of State for Prisons	Robert Buckland	May–July 2019
Parliamentary Under-Secretary of State for Prisons and Probation	Sam Gyimah	July 2016 – January 2018
Parliamentary Under-Secretary of State for Victims, Youth and Family Justice	Phillip Lee	July 2016 – June 2018
Parliamentary Under-Secretary of State	Lucy Frazer	January 2018 – May 2019
Parliamentary Under-Secretary of State	Paul Maynard	May–July 2019
Parliamentary Under-Secretary of State	Edward Argar	June 2018 – July 2019
Advocate General for Scotland	Richard Keen, Baron Keen of Elie	July 2016 – July 2019

Northern Ireland
Secretary of State for Northern Ireland	James Brokenshire	July 2016 – January 2018
Secretary of State for Northern Ireland	**Karen Bradley**	January 2018 – July 2019
Parliamentary Under-Secretary of State	Chloe Smith (unpaid; also an Assistant Whip)	June 2017 – January 2018
Minister of State	Shailesh Vara	January–November 2018
Minister of State	John Penrose	November 2018 – July 2019
Parliamentary Under-Secretary of State	Nick Bourne, Baron Bourne of Aberystwyth (also Minister for Faith at Housing, Communities & Local Govt)	June–October 2017
Parliamentary Under-Secretary of State	Ian Duncan, Baron Duncan of Springbank	October 2017 – July 2019

Scotland
Secretary of State for Scotland	**David Mundell**	July 2016 – July 2019
Parliamentary Under-Secretary of State	Ian Duncan, Baron Duncan of Springbank	June 2017 – July 2019

Transport
Secretary of State for Transport	**Chris Grayling**	July 2016 – July 2019
Minister of State for Transport Legislation and Maritime	John Hayes	July 2016 – January 2018
Minister of State; Minister for London	Jo Johnson	January–November 2018
Minister of State	Jesse Norman	November 2018 – May 2019
Minister of State	Michael Ellis	May–July 2019
Parliamentary Under-Secretary of State for Rail, Accessibility and HS2	Paul Maynard	July 2016 – January 2018
Parliamentary Under-Secretary of State for Roads, Local Transport and Devolution	Jesse Norman	June 2017 – November 2018
Parliamentary Under-Secretary of State for Roads, Local Transport and Devolution	Andrew Jones	November 2018 – July 2019
Parliamentary Under-Secretary of State for Transport	Liz Sugg, Baroness Sugg (unpaid until Jan 2018; also Lords Whip since)	October 2017 – April 2019
Parliamentary Under-Secretary of State for Transport	Charlotte Vere, Baroness Vere of Norbiton (also a Lords Whip)	April–July 2019
Parliamentary Under-Secretary of State for Aviation, International and Security	Martin Callanan, Baron Callanan	June–October 2017
Parliamentary Under-Secretary of State	Nus Ghani (unpaid; also an Assistant Whip)	January 2018 – July 2019

Treasury
Chancellor of the Exchequer; Second Lord of the Treasury	**Philip Hammond**	July 2016 – July 2019
Chief Secretary to the Treasury	**Liz Truss**	June 2017 – July 2019
Financial Secretary to the Treasury; Paymaster General	Mel Stride	June 2017 – May 2019
Financial Secretary to the Treasury; Paymaster General	Jesse Norman	May–July 2019
Economic Secretary to the Treasury (City Minister)	Steve Barclay (paid as a Parliamentary Secretary)	June 2017 – January 2018
Economic Secretary to the Treasury (City Minister)	John Glen (paid as a Parliamentary Secretary)	January 2018 – July 2019
Exchequer Secretary to the Treasury	Andrew Jones (paid as a Parliamentary Secretary)	June 2017 – January 2018
Exchequer Secretary to the Treasury	Robert Jenrick (paid as a Parliamentary Secretary)	January 2018 – July 2019

Wales
Secretary of State for Wales	**Alun Cairns**	March 2016 – July 2019
Parliamentary Under-Secretary of State for Wales	Ian Duncan, Baron Duncan of Springbank	June–October 2017
Parliamentary Under-Secretary of State for Wales	Nick Bourne, Baron Bourne of Aberystwyth (also Minister for Faith at Housing, Communities & Local Govt)	October 2017 – July 2019
Parliamentary Under-Secretary of State for Wales	Guto Bebb (unpaid; also a Whip)	March 2016 – January 2018
Parliamentary Under-Secretary of State for Wales	Stuart Andrew (unpaid; also an Assistant Whip)	January–July 2018
Parliamentary Under-Secretary of State for Wales	Mims Davies (unpaid; also an Assistant Whip)	July–November 2018
Parliamentary Under-Secretary of State for Wales	Nigel Adams (unpaid; also an Assistant Whip)	November 2018 – April 2019
Parliamentary Under-Secretary of State for Wales	Kevin Foster (unpaid; also Interim Minister for the Constitution at the Cabinet Office, and an Assistant Whip)	April–July 2019

Work and Pensions
Secretary of State for Work and Pensions	David Gauke	June 2017 – January 2018
Secretary of State for Work and Pensions	Esther McVey	January–November 2018
Secretary of State for Work and Pensions	**Amber Rudd**	November 2018 – July 2019
Minister of State for Disabled People, Health and Work	Penny Mordaunt	July 2016 – November 2017
Minister of State for Disabled People, Health and Work	Sarah Newton	November 2017 – March 2019
Minister of State for Disabled People, Health and Work	Justin Tomlinson	April–July 2019
Minister of State for Employment	Damian Hinds	July 2016 – January 2018
Minister of State for Employment	Alok Sharma	January 2018 – July 2019
Parliamentary Under-Secretary for Family Support, Housing and Child Maintenance	Caroline Dinenage	June 2017 – January 2018
Parliamentary Under-Secretary for Family Support, Housing and Child Maintenance	Kit Malthouse	January–July 2018
Parliamentary Under-Secretary for Family Support, Housing and Child Maintenance	Justin Tomlinson	July 2018 – April 2019
Parliamentary Under-Secretary for Family Support, Housing and Child Maintenance	Will Quince	April–July 2019
Parliamentary Under-Secretary of State for Pensions and Financial Inclusion	Guy Opperman	June 2017 – July 2019
Parliamentary Under-Secretary of State	Peta Buscombe, Baroness Buscombe	June 2017 – July 2019

=== Law officers ===
Attorney General's Office
Attorney General for England and Wales	Jeremy Wright	January 2014 – July 2018
Attorney General for England and Wales	**Geoffrey Cox**	July 2018 – July 2019
Solicitor General for England and Wales	Robert Buckland	July 2014 – May 2019
Solicitor General for England and Wales	Lucy Frazer	May – July 2019

Office of the Advocate General for Scotland
Advocate General for Scotland	Richard Keen, Baron Keen of Elie	May 2015 – September 2020

=== Parliament ===
House Leaders
Leader of the House of Lords; Lord Keeper of the Privy Seal	**Natalie Evans, Baroness Evans of Bowes Park**	July 2016 – July 2019
Deputy Leader of the House of Lords	Frederick Curzon, 7th Earl Howe (unpaid; also Minister of State at Defence)	May 2015 – July 2019
Leader of the House of Commons; Lord President of the Council	Andrea Leadsom	June 2017 – May 2019
Leader of the House of Commons; Lord President of the Council	**Mel Stride**	May 2019 – July 2019
Parliamentary Secretary; Deputy Leader of the House of Commons	Michael Ellis (unpaid until Jul 2017; also a Whip beforehand)	July 2016 – January 2018
Parliamentary Secretary; Deputy Leader of the House of Commons	Chris Heaton-Harris (also Comptroller of the Household)	January – July 2018
Parliamentary Secretary; Deputy Leader of the House of Commons	Mark Spencer (also Comptroller of the Household)	July 2018 – July 2019

House of Commons Whips
Chief Whip of the House of Commons; Parliamentary Secretary to the Treasury	Gavin Williamson	July 2016 – November 2017
Chief Whip of the House of Commons; Parliamentary Secretary to the Treasury	**Julian Smith**	November 2017 – July 2019
Deputy Chief Whip of the House of Commons; Treasurer of the Household	Julian Smith	June–November 2017
Deputy Chief Whip of the House of Commons; Treasurer of the Household	Esther McVey	November 2017 – January 2018
Deputy Chief Whip of the House of Commons; Treasurer of the Household	Christopher Pincher	January 2018 – July 2019
Whip; Comptroller of the Household	Christopher Pincher	June–November 2017
Whip; Comptroller of the Household	Vacant	November 2017 – January 2018
Whip; Comptroller of the Household	Christopher Heaton-Harris (also Deputy Leader of the House of Commons)	January–July 2018
Whip; Comptroller of the Household	Mark Spencer (also Deputy Leader of the House of Commons)	July 2018 – July 2019
Whip; Vice-Chamberlain of the Household	Christopher Heaton-Harris	June 2017 – January 2018
Whip; Vice-Chamberlain of the Household	Mark Spencer	January–July 2018
Whip; Vice-Chamberlain of the Household	Andrew Stephenson	July 2018 – April 2019
Whip; Vice-Chamberlain of the Household	Craig Whittaker	April–July 2019
Whips; Junior Lords of the Treasury	David Evennett	September 2012 – January 2018
Whips; Junior Lords of the Treasury	Guto Bebb (also Parliamentary Under-Secretary of State for Wales)	March 2016 – January 2018
Whips; Junior Lords of the Treasury	Andrew Griffiths	July 2016 – January 2018
Whips; Junior Lords of the Treasury	Mark Spencer	June 2017 – January 2018
Whips; Junior Lords of the Treasury	Heather Wheeler	June 2017 – January 2018
Whips; Junior Lords of the Treasury	David Rutley (unpaid until Jan 2018; also Interim Parliamentary Under-Secretary of State for Food and Animal Welfare at DEFRA May–July 2018)	June 2017 – July 2019
Whips; Junior Lords of the Treasury	Andrew Stephenson	January–July 2018
Whips; Junior Lords of the Treasury	Paul Maynard	January 2018 – May 2019
Whips; Junior Lords of the Treasury	Craig Whittaker	January 2018 – April 2019
Whips; Junior Lords of the Treasury	Rebecca Harris	January 2018 – July 2019
Whips; Junior Lords of the Treasury	Nigel Adams (unpaid; also Parliamentary Under-Secretary of State at Housing, Communities & Local Government from May 2018)	January–November 2018
Whips; Junior Lords of the Treasury	Mike Freer	July 2018 – July 2019
Whips; Junior Lords of the Treasury	Jeremy Quin (unpaid)	November 2018 – July 2019
Whips; Junior Lords of the Treasury	Alister Jack	April–July 2019
Whips; Junior Lords of the Treasury	Nus Ghani (also Parliamentary Under-Secretary of State for Aviation, International and Security at Transport)	July 2019
Assistant Whips	Michael Ellis (unpaid; also Deputy Leader of the House of Commons)	July 2016 – July 2017
Assistant Whips	Graham Stuart	July 2016 – January 2018
Assistant Whips	Chloe Smith (also with Northern Ireland Office)	June 2017 – January 2018
Assistant Whips	Mike Freer	June 2017 – July 2018
Assistant Whips	Rebecca Harris	June 2017 – January 2018
Assistant Whips	Nigel Adams (also Parliamentary Under-Secretary of State for Wales from Nov 2018)	June 2017 – January 2018, November 2018 – April 2019
Assistant Whips	Andrew Stephenson	June 2017 – January 2018
Assistant Whips	Craig Whittaker	June 2017 – January 2018
Assistant Whips	Stuart Andrew (also Parliamentary Under-Secretary of State for Wales from Jan 2018)	June 2017 – July 2018
Assistant Whips	Nus Ghani (also Parliamentary Under-Secretary of State for Aviation, International and Security at Transport)	January 2018 – July 2019
Assistant Whips	Jo Churchill	January 2018 – July 2019
Assistant Whips	Amanda Milling	January 2018 – July 2019
Assistant Whips	Kelly Tolhurst	January–July 2018
Assistant Whips	Wendy Morton (unpaid until Jul 2018)	January 2018 – July 2019
Assistant Whips	Mims Davies (also Parliamentary Under-Secretary of State for Wales from Jul 2018)	January–November 2018
Assistant Whips	Iain Stewart	July 2018 – July 2019
Assistant Whips	Michelle Donelan	July 2018 – July 2019
Assistant Whips	Jeremy Quin (unpaid)	July–November 2018
Assistant Whips	Gareth Johnson (unpaid)	November 2018 – January 2019
Assistant Whips	Alister Jack (unpaid)	February–April 2019
Assistant Whips	Matt Warman (unpaid)	April–July 2019
Assistant Whips	Kevin Foster (also Interim Minister for the Constitution at the Cabinet Office, and Parliamentary Under-Secretary of State at the Wales Office)	April–July 2019

House of Lords Whips
Captain of the Honourable Corps of Gentlemen-at-Arms; Chief Whip of the House of Lords	John Taylor, Baron Taylor of Holbeach	August 2014 – July 2019
Captain of the Yeomen of the Guard; Deputy Chief Whip of the House of Lords	Patrick Stopford, 9th Earl of Courtown	July 2016 – July 2019
Whips; Baronesses and Lords in Waiting	Annabel Goldie, Baroness Goldie	July 2016 – July 2019
Whips; Baronesses and Lords in Waiting	Charlotte Vere, Baroness Vere of Norbiton	December 2016 – July 2019
Whips; Baronesses and Lords in Waiting	James Younger, 5th Viscount Younger of Leckie	May 2015 – July 2019
Whips; Baronesses and Lords in Waiting	George Young, Baron Young of Cookham	July 2016 – July 2019
Whips; Baronesses and Lords in Waiting	Liz Sugg, Baroness Sugg	June–October 2017, January 2018 – July 2019
Whips; Baronesses and Lords in Waiting	Carlyn Chisholm, Baroness Chisholm of Owlpen	June 2017 – March 2018
Whips; Baronesses and Lords in Waiting	Deborah Stedman-Scott, Baroness Stedman-Scott (unpaid)	October 2017 – July 2019
Whips; Baronesses and Lords in Waiting	Zahida Manzoor, Baroness Manzoor (unpaid)	March 2018 – May 2019
Whips; Baronesses and Lords in Waiting	Diana Barran, Baroness Barran (unpaid)	November 2018 – July 2019

== Notes ==
Preceded by First May ministry	Government of the United Kingdom; 2017–2019	Succeeded by First Johnson ministry
