= First Johnson ministry =

UK government in 2019

- Cabinet of the United Kingdom
- July – December 2019
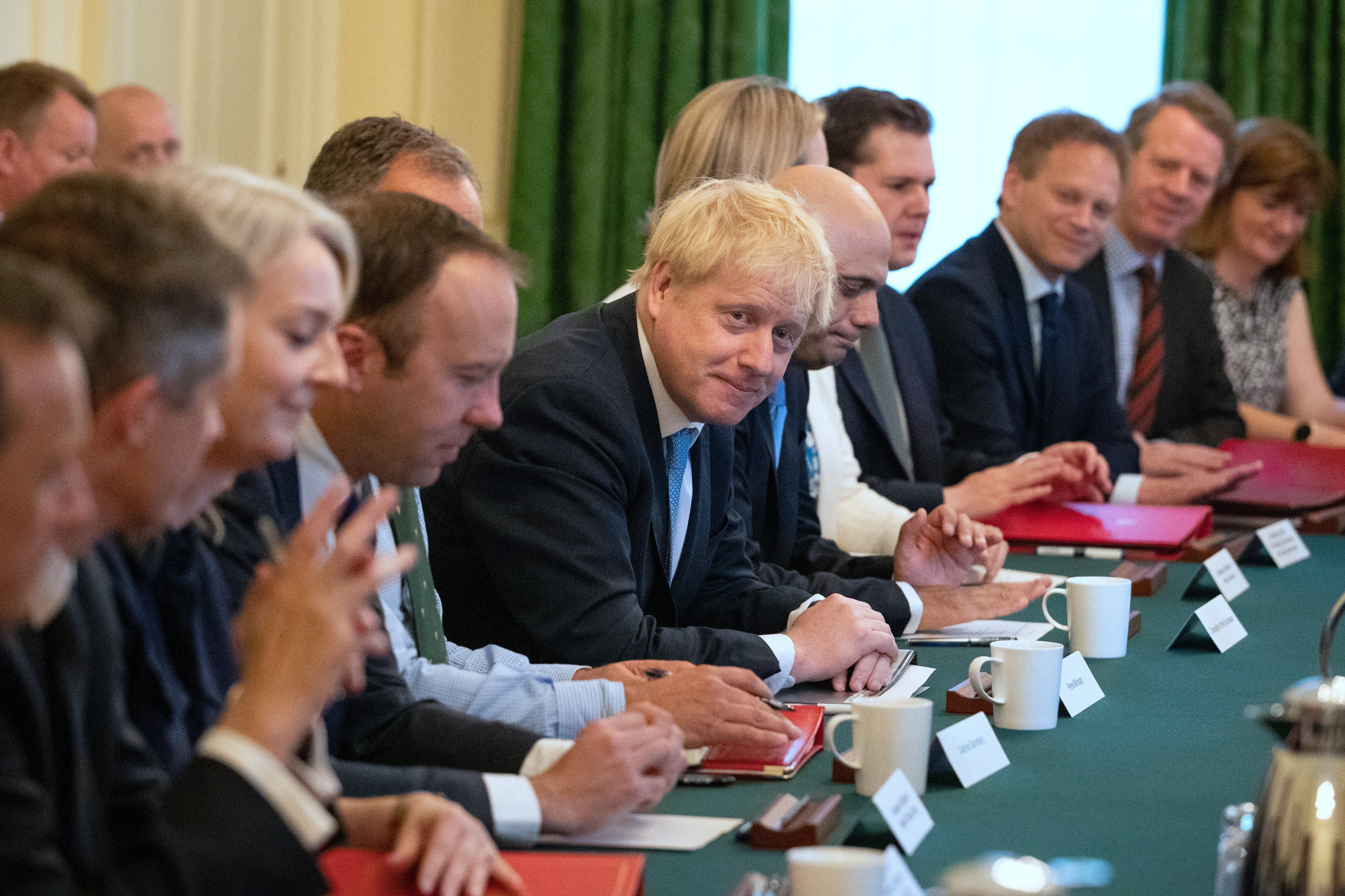
- Johnson holding his first cabinet meeting
- Date formed: 24 July 2019
- Date dissolved: 16 December 2019

People and organisations
- Monarch: Elizabeth II
- Prime Minister: Boris Johnson
- Prime Minister's history: Premiership of Boris Johnson
- First Secretary: Dominic Raab
- Ministers removed: 3 resigned
- Member party: Conservative Party
- Status in legislature: Minority with DUP confidence & supply
- Opposition cabinet: Corbyn shadow cabinet
- Opposition party: Labour Party
- Opposition leader: Jeremy Corbyn

History
- Incoming formation: 2019 Conservative leadership election
- Outgoing election: 2019 general election
- Legislature terms: 2017–2019 (Note: Although the 57th Parliament was due to last until 2022, Johnson successfully sought the backing of Parliament for a snap election on 29 October 2019.)
- Predecessor: Second May ministry
- Successor: Second Johnson ministry

The first Johnson ministry began on 24 July 2019 when Queen Elizabeth II invited Boris Johnson to form a new government, following the resignation of the predecessor Prime Minister Theresa May. May had resigned as Leader of the Conservative Party on 7 June 2019; Johnson was elected as her successor on 23 July 2019. The Johnson ministry was formed from the 57th Parliament of the United Kingdom, as a Conservative minority government. It lost its working majority on 3 September 2019 when Tory MP Phillip Lee crossed the floor to the Liberal Democrats. An election was called for 12 December 2019, which led to the formation of a Conservative majority government, the second Johnson ministry.

== History ==
Theresa May announced on 24 May 2019 that she would resign as Leader of the Conservative Party and therefore prime minister, after failing three times to secure passage through the House of Commons of her Withdrawal Agreement and Implementation Bill, which would have seen the United Kingdom leave the European Union. Her announcement also followed the Conservative Party's very poor showing in the 2019 European Parliament elections in the UK. Her resignation as Conservative leader took effect on 7 June 2019.

The former London Mayor and Foreign Secretary Boris Johnson was elected to succeed May on 23 July 2019. He was appointed prime minister on the following day by Queen Elizabeth II. Johnson inherited a minority government, supported by a confidence and supply agreement with the Democratic Unionist Party of Northern Ireland.

Johnson appointed his cabinet on 24 July 2019, describing it as a "Cabinet for modern Britain", with The Guardian branding it "an ethnically diverse but ideologically homogeneous statement of intent". While forming his government, Johnson dismissed 11 senior ministers and accepted the resignation of six others, a purge described by Johnson's ally Nigel Evans as "not so much a reshuffle as a summer's day massacre". The mass dismissal was the most extensive Cabinet reorganisation without a change in ruling party in postwar British political history, exceeding the seven Cabinet ministers dismissed in the "Night of the Long Knives" of 1962, and was dubbed the "Night of the Blond Knives" by The Sun.

Among other appointments, Johnson made Dominic Raab the First Secretary of State and Foreign Secretary, and appointed Sajid Javid and Priti Patel as Chancellor of the Exchequer and Home Secretary respectively. Johnson increased the number of ministers attending the Cabinet to 33, four more than had attended the May Cabinet. One quarter of those appointed were women, proportionally less than the May and Cameron ministries. The Cabinet set a new record for ethnic minority representation, with four secretaries of state and two additional ministers coming from minority backgrounds; 17% of the Cabinet were from BAME backgrounds, compared to 14% of the UK population. Nearly two-thirds of those appointed went to fee-paying schools, and almost half had attended Oxford or Cambridge universities. Johnson also created a new ministerial title to be held by himself, Minister for the Union, fulfilling a campaign pledge he had made in the leadership election.

Loss of majority and ministerial resignations

Johnson lost his working majority on 3 September 2019, when Phillip Lee crossed the floor to join the Liberal Democrats. This was reduced further later the same day when 21 Conservative MPs had the whip removed after voting against the Government in order to enable Parliament to take control of the order paper and to debate a back bench bill designed to prevent a no-deal Brexit.

On 5 September 2019, Johnson's brother and Orpington MP Jo Johnson announced his intention to resign both his ministerial position and parliamentary seat, stating "In recent weeks I've been torn between family loyalty and the national interest — it's an unresolvable tension & time for others to take on my roles as MP & Minister." On 7 September 2019, Amber Rudd announced she was resigning as Secretary of State for Work and Pensions and Minister for Women and Equalities, and leaving the Conservative Party.

Amid an impasse in parliament over Brexit, an election was called for 12 December 2019 by virtue of the passage of the Early Parliamentary General Election Act 2019 on 31 October 2019. The Conservatives won a majority, leading to the formation of the second Johnson ministry on 16 December 2019.

== Cabinet ==
=== July–December 2019 ===
First Johnson cabinet
Portfolio	Portrait	Minister	Term
Cabinet ministers			
Prime Minister; First Lord of the Treasury; Minister for the Civil Service; Minister for the Union; Commonwealth Chair-in-Office		Boris Johnson	2019–2022
Chancellor of the Exchequer; Second Lord of the Treasury		Sajid Javid	2019–2020
First Secretary of State; Secretary of State for Foreign and Commonwealth Affairs		Dominic Raab	2019–2021
Secretary of State for the Home Department		Priti Patel	2019–2022
Chancellor of the Duchy of Lancaster		Michael Gove	2019–2021
Secretary of State for Justice; Lord High Chancellor of Great Britain		Robert Buckland	2019–2021
Secretary of State for Exiting the European Union		Steve Barclay	2018–2020
Secretary of State for Defence		Ben Wallace	2019–2023
Secretary of State for Health and Social Care		Matt Hancock	2018–2021
Secretary of State for Business, Energy and Industrial Strategy		Andrea Leadsom	2019–2020
Secretary of State for International Trade; President of the Board of Trade		Liz Truss	2019–2021
Minister for Women and Equalities		Liz Truss	Sept 2019–2022
Minister for Women and Equalities		Amber Rudd	2018 – Sept 2019
Secretary of State for Work and Pensions		Amber Rudd	2018 – Sept 2019
Secretary of State for Work and Pensions		Thérèse Coffey	Sept 2019 – Sept 2022
Secretary of State for Education		Gavin Williamson	2019–2021
Secretary of State for Environment, Food and Rural Affairs		Theresa Villiers	2019–2020
Secretary of State for Housing, Communities and Local Government		Robert Jenrick	2019–2021
Secretary of State for Transport		Grant Shapps	2019–2022
Secretary of State for Northern Ireland		Julian Smith	2019–2020
Secretary of State for Scotland		Alister Jack	2019–2024
Secretary of State for Wales		Alun Cairns	2016 – November 2019
Leader of the House of Lords; Lord Keeper of the Privy Seal		Natalie Evans; Baroness Evans of Bowes Park	2016–2022
Secretary of State for Digital, Culture, Media and Sport		Nicky Morgan	2019–2020
Secretary of State for International Development		Alok Sharma	2019–2020
Minister without Portfolio; Party Chairman		James Cleverly	2019–2020
Also attending cabinet meetings			
Chief Secretary to the Treasury		Rishi Sunak	2019–2020
Leader of the House of Commons; Lord President of the Council		Jacob Rees-Mogg	2019–2022
Chief Whip of the House of Commons; Parliamentary Secretary to the Treasury		Mark Spencer	2019–2022
Attorney General		Geoffrey Cox	2018–2020
Minister of State for Energy		Kwasi Kwarteng	2019–2021
Minister for the Cabinet Office; Paymaster General		Oliver Dowden	2019–2020
Minister of State for the Northern Powerhouse		Jake Berry	2019–2020
Minister of State for Housing		Esther McVey	2019–2020
Minister of State for Business, Energy and Industrial Strategy and Universities		Jo Johnson	July–Sept 2019
Minister of State for Environment, Food and Rural Affairs and International Development		Zac Goldsmith	Sept–Dec 2019
Minister of State for Security; Deputy for EU Exit and No Deal Preparation		Brandon Lewis	2019–2020

==== Changes ====
- Jo Johnson quit the government on 5 September 2019 and said that he would resign as an MP. His spot in the cabinet was filled by Zac Goldsmith, who was made Minister of State at the Department for Environment, Food and Rural Affairs and at the Department for International Development on 10 September 2019.
- Amber Rudd resigned from the cabinet and from the Conservative Party on 7 September 2019. She was replaced as Secretary of State for Work and Pensions by Thérèse Coffey on 8 September 2019, and as Minister for Women and Equalities by Liz Truss on 10 September 2019.
- Alun Cairns resigned from his post of Welsh Secretary on 6 November 2019.

== List of ministers ==
Minister in the House of Commons	Minister in the House of Lords
Ministers who attend cabinet are listed **in bold**

=== Prime Minister and Cabinet Office ===
Cabinet Office
Post	Minister	Term
Prime Minister of the United Kingdom; First Lord of the Treasury; Minister for the Civil Service; Minister for the Union	**Boris Johnson**	July 2019 – September 2022
Chancellor of the Duchy of Lancaster	**Michael Gove**	July 2019 – September 2021
Leader of the House of Lords; Lord Keeper of the Privy Seal	**Natalie Evans**	July 2016 – September 2022
Minister without Portfolio	**James Cleverly** (unpaid; also Chairman of the Conservative Party)	July 2019 – February 2020
Leader of the House of Commons; Lord President of the Council	**Jacob Rees-Mogg**	July 2019 – February 2022
Minister for the Cabinet Office; Paymaster General	**Oliver Dowden**	July 2019 – February 2020
Parliamentary Secretary (Minister for Implementation)	Simon Hart	July 2019 – December 2019
Minister of State (Minister for the Northern Powerhouse and Local Growth)	**Jake Berry** (jointly with Housing, Communities and Local Government)	July 2019 – February 2020
Parliamentary Secretary (Minister for the Constitution)	Chloe Smith	January 2018 – February 2020
Interim Parliamentary Secretary (Minister for the Constitution)	Kevin Foster (jointly with Wales Office and Whips Office)	April 2019 – December 2019
Parliamentary Secretary (Minister for Defence People and Veterans)	Johnny Mercer (jointly with Defence)	July 2019 – April 2021

=== Departments of State ===
Business, Energy and Industrial Strategy
Secretary of State for Business, Energy and Industrial Strategy	**Andrea Leadsom**	July 2019 – February 2020
Minister of State for Business, Energy & Clean growth	**Kwasi Kwarteng**	July 2019 – January 2021
Minister of State for Universities, Science, Research & Innovation	Jo Johnson (jointly with Education)	July 2019 – September 2019
Minister of State for Universities, Science, Research & Innovation	Chris Skidmore (jointly with Education)	September 2019 – February 2020
Parliamentary Under-Secretary of State for Small Business, Consumers and Corporate Responsibility	Kelly Tolhurst	July 2018 – February 2020
Parliamentary Under-Secretary of State (Minister for Business & Industry	Nadhim Zahawi	July 2019 – September 2021
Parliamentary Under-Secretary of State (Minister for Climate Change)	Ian Duncan, Baron Duncan of Springbank (jointly with Northern Ireland Office)	July 2019 – February 2020

Defence
Secretary of State for Defence	**Ben Wallace**	July 2019 – August 2023
Minister of State for the Armed Forces	Mark Lancaster	July 2017 – December 2019
Minister of State for Defence	Annabel Goldie, Baroness Goldie (unpaid)	July 2019 – November 2023
Parliamentary Under-Secretary of State (Minister for Defence Procurement)	Anne-Marie Trevelyan	July 2019 – February 2020
Parliamentary Under-Secretary of State (Minister for Defence People and Veterans)	Johnny Mercer (jointly with Cabinet Office)	July 2019 – April 2021

Digital, Culture, Media and Sport
Secretary of State for Digital, Culture, Media and Sport	**Nicky Morgan**	July 2019 – February 2020
Minister of State for Sport, Media and Creative Industries	Nigel Adams	July 2019 – February 2020
Parliamentary Under-Secretary of State for Arts. Heritage and Tourism	Rebecca Pow	May 2019 – September 2019
Parliamentary Under-Secretary of State for Arts. Heritage and Tourism	Helen Whately	September 2019 – February 2020
Parliamentary Under-Secretary of State for Digital and Broadband	Matt Warman	July 2019 – September 2021
Parliamentary Under-Secretary of State (Minister for Civil Society & DCMS)	Diana Barran, Baroness Barran (Unpaid)	July 2019 – September 2021

Education
Secretary of State for Education	**Gavin Williamson**	July 2019 – September 2021
Minister of State for School Standards	Nick Gibb	May 2015 – September 2021
Minister of State for Universities, Science, Research & Innovation	Jo Johnson (jointly with BEIS)	July 2019 – September 2019
Minister of State for Universities, Science, Research & Innovation	Chris Skidmore (jointly with BEIS)	September 2019 – February 2020
Parliamentary Under-Secretary of State (Minister for Children and Families)	Kemi Badenoch	July 2019 – February 2020
Parliamentary Under-Secretary of State (Minister for Children and Families)	Michelle Donelan (Maternity Cover)	September 2019 – February 2020
Parliamentary Under-Secretary of State (Minister for the School System)	Theodore Agnew, Baron Agnew of Oulton (unpaid)	July 2019 – February 2020

Environment, Food and Rural Affairs
Secretary of State for Environment, Food and Rural Affairs	**Theresa Villiers**	July 2019 – February 2020
Minister of State for Environment and Rural Opportunity	Thérèse Coffey	July 2019 – September 2019
Minister of State for Environment and Rural Opportunity	Rebecca Pow	September 2019 – July 2022
Minister of State for Agriculture, Fisheries and Food	George Eustice	July 2019 – February 2020
Parliamentary Under-Secretary of State	Zac Goldsmith (jointly with International Development)	July 2019 – September 2019
Minister of State	Zac Goldsmith (jointly with International Development)	September 2019 – September 2022
Parliamentary Under-Secretary of State (Minister for Rural Affairs and Biosecurity)	John Gardiner, Baron Gardiner of Kimble	July 2019 – May 2021

Equalities Office
Minister for Women and Equalities	Amber Rudd (jointly with Work and Pensions)	July 2019 – September 2019
Minister for Women and Equalities	**Liz Truss** (jointly with International Trade)	September 2019 – September 2022
Minister of State (Minister for Equalities)	Susan Williams, Baroness Williams of Trafford (jointly with Work and Pensions to September 2019, International Trade from September 2019)	July 2016 – February 2020
Parliamentary Under-Secretary of State (Minister for Women)	Victoria Atkins (jointly with Work and Pensions to September 2019, International Trade from September 2019)	January 2018 – February 2020

Exiting the European Union
Secretary of State for Exiting the European Union	**Steve Barclay**	November 2018 – January 2020
Minister of State	Martin Callanan, Baron Callanan	October 2017 – January 2020
Parliamentary Under-Secretary of State	James Duddridge	July 2019 – January 2020

Foreign and Commonwealth Office
Secretary of State for Foreign and Commonwealth Affairs; First Secretary of State	**Dominic Raab**	July 2019 – September 2021
Minister of State for Europe and the Americas	Christopher Pincher	July 2019 – February 2020
Minister of State for the Middle East and North Africa	Andrew Murrison (jointly with International Development)	May 2019 – February 2020
Minister of State for Africa	Andrew Stephenson (jointly with International Development)	July 2019 – February 2020
Minister of State for the Commonwealth, the UN and South Asia	Tariq Ahmad, Baron Ahmad of Wimbledon	June 2017 – July 2024
Parliamentary Under-Secretary of State (Minister for Asia and the Pacific)	Heather Wheeler	July 2019 – February 2020

Health and Social Care
Secretary of State for Health and Social Care	**Matt Hancock**	July 2018 – June 2021
Minister of State for Health	Chris Skidmore	July 2019 – September 2019
Minister of State for Health	Edward Argar	September 2019 – July 2022
Minister of State for Care	Caroline Dinenage	January 2018 – February 2020
Parliamentary Under-Secretary of State for Prevention, Public Health & Primary Care	Jo Churchill	July 2019 – September 2021
Parliamentary Under-Secretary of State for Mental Health, Suicide Prevention & Patient Safety	Nadine Dorries	July 2019 – September 2021
Parliamentary Under-Secretary of State	Nicola Blackwood, Baroness Blackwood of North Oxford	January 2019 – February 2020

Home Office
Secretary of State for the Home Department	**Priti Patel**	July 2019 – September 2022
Deputy Home Secretary and Minister of State for Security	**Brandon Lewis**	July 2019 – February 2020
Minister of State for Crime, Policing & the Fire Service	Kit Malthouse	July 2019 – July 2022
Minister of State for Countering Extremism	Susan Williams, Baroness Williams of Trafford (jointly with Equalities Office)	July 2016 – September 2022
Parliamentary Under-Secretary of State (Minister for Crime, Safeguarding and Vulnerability)	Victoria Atkins (jointly with Equalities Office)	November 2017 – September 2021
Parliamentary Under-Secretary of State for Immigration	Seema Kennedy	July 2019 – December 2019

Housing, Communities & Local Government
Secretary of State for Housing, Communities and Local Government	**Robert Jenrick**	July 2019 – September 2021
Minister of State for Housing	**Esther McVey**	July 2019 – February 2020
Minister of State for the Northern Powerhouse and Local Growth	**Jake Berry** (jointly with Cabinet Office)	July 2019 – February 2020
Parliamentary Under-Secretary of State (Minister for Local Government and Homelessness)	Luke Hall	July 2019 – September 2020
Parliamentary Under-Secretary of State (Minister for Faith and Communities)	James Younger, 5th Viscount Younger of Leckie	July 2019 – February 2020

International Development
Secretary of State for International Development	**Alok Sharma**	July 2019 – February 2020
Minister of State for International Development	Andrew Murrison (jointly with the FCO)	May 2019 – February 2020
Minister of State	Andrew Stephenson (jointly with the FCO)	July 2019 – February 2020
Parliamentary Under-Secretary of State	Zac Goldsmith (jointly with DEFRA)	July 2019 – September 2019
Minister of State	Zac Goldsmith (jointly with DEFRA)	September 2019 – September 2020
Parliamentary Under-Secretary of State for International Development	Liz Sugg, Baroness Sugg	July 2019 – September 2020

International Trade
Secretary of State for International Trade; President of the Board of Trade	**Liz Truss** (also Minister for Women and Equalities from Sept 2019)	July 2019 – September 2021
Minister of State for International Trade	Conor Burns	July 2019 – May 2020
Parliamentary Under-Secretary of State (Minister for Investment)	Graham Stuart	January 2018 – September 2021
Parliamentary Under-Secretary of State (Minister for Women)	Victoria Atkins (also with Equalities)	September 2019 – February 2020
Minister for Equalites	Susan Williams, Baroness Williams of Trafford (also with Equalities)	September 2019 – February 2020

Justice
Secretary of State for Justice; Lord High Chancellor of Great Britain	**Robert Buckland**	July 2019 – September 2021
Advocate General for Scotland; Spokesperson for the Lords	Richard Keen, Baron Keen of Elie	May 2015 – September 2020
Minister of State for Prisons and Probation	Lucy Frazer	July 2019 – March 2021
Parliamentary Under-Secretary of State	Wendy Morton	July 2019 – February 2020
Parliamentary Under-Secretary of State	Edward Argar	June 2018 – September 2019
Parliamentary Under-Secretary of State	Chris Philp	September 2019 – February 2020

Northern Ireland Office
Secretary of State for Northern Ireland	**Julian Smith**	July 2019 – December 2019
Minister of State for Northern Ireland (Minister for London)	Nick Hurd	July 2019 – December 2019
Parliamentary Under-Secretary of State	Robin Walker (jointly with Scotland Office)	July 2019 – September 2021
Parliamentary Under-Secretary of State for Northern Ireland	Ian Duncan, Baron Duncan of Springbank (jointly with BEIS)	October 2017 – February 2020

Scotland Office
Secretary of State for Scotland	**Alister Jack**	July 2019 – July 2024
Parliamentary Under-Secretary of State for Scotland	Colin Clark (jointly with Whips Office)	July 2019 – December 2019
Parliamentary Under-Secretary of State	Robin Walker (jointly with Northern Ireland Office)	July 2019 – December 2019

Transport
Secretary of State for Transport	**Grant Shapps**	July 2019 – September 2022
Minister of State for Rail	Chris Heaton-Harris	July 2019 – December 2021
Minister of State for High Speed 2	George Freeman	July 2019 – February 2020
Parliamentary Under-Secretary of State for Aviation & Maritime	Nus Ghani (jointly with Whips Office)	January 2018 – February 2020
Parliamentary Under-Secretary of State for Future of Transport	Paul Maynard	July 2019 – February 2020
Parliamentary Under-Secretary of State for Roads & Light Rail	Baroness Vere of Norbiton	July 2019 – November 2023

Treasury
Chancellor of the Exchequer; Second Lord of the Treasury	**Sajid Javid**	July 2019 – February 2020
Chief Secretary to the Treasury	**Rishi Sunak**	July 2019 – February 2020
Financial Secretary to the Treasury	Jesse Norman	May 2019 – September 2021
Economic Secretary to the Treasury	John Glen (Paid as a Parliamentary Secretary)	January 2018 – July 2022
Exchequer Secretary to the Treasury	Simon Clarke (Paid as a Parliamentary Secretary)	July 2019 – February 2020

Wales Office
Secretary of State for Wales	Alun Cairns	March 2016 – November 2019
Parliamentary Under-Secretary of State	Kevin Foster (jointly with Cabinet Office until Oct 2019, and Whips Office) (unpaid)	April 2019 – December 2019

Work and Pensions
Secretary of State for Work and Pensions	Amber Rudd (jointly with Equalities Office)	July 2019 – September 2019
Secretary of State for Work and Pensions	**Therese Coffey**	September 2019 – September 2022
Minister of State for Disabled People, Health and Work	Justin Tomlinson	April 2019 – September 2021
Parliamentary Under-Secretary of State for Pensions and Financial Inclusion	Guy Opperman	June 2017 – September 2022
Parliamentary Under-Secretary of State for Welfare Delivery	Will Quince	April 2019 – September 2021
Parliamentary Under-Secretary of State (Minister for Employment)	Mims Davies	July 2019 – July 2022
Parliamentary Under-Secretary of State (Minister for Work and Pensions)	Deborah Stedman-Scott, Baroness Stedman-Scott	July 2019 – January 2023
Minister of State for Equalities	Susan Williams, Baroness Williams of Trafford (jointly with Equalities Office)	July 2019 – February 2020
Parliamentary Under-Secretary of State (Minister for Women)	Victoria Atkins (jointly with Equalities Office)	July 2019 – February 2020

=== Law officers ===
Attorney General's Office
Attorney General for England and Wales	**Geoffrey Cox**	July 2018 – February 2020
Solicitor General for England and Wales	**Michael Ellis**	July 2019 – March 2021

Office of the Advocate General
Advocate General for Scotland	Richard Keen, Baron Keen of Elie	May 2015 – September 2020

=== Parliament ===
House Leaders
Leader of the House of Lords; Lord Keeper of the Privy Seal	**Natalie Evans, Baroness Evans of Bowes Park**	July 2016 – September 2022
Leader of the House of Commons; Lord President of the Council	**Jacob Rees-Mogg**	July 2019 – February 2022
Deputy Leader of the House of Lords	Frederick Curzon, 7th Earl Howe (Unpaid)	May 2015 – July 2024

House of Commons Whips
Government Chief Whip in the House of Commons; Parliamentary Secretary to the Treasury	Mark Spencer	July 2019 – February 2022
Deputy Government Chief Whip; Treasurer of HM Household	Amanda Milling	July 2019 – February 2020
Whip; Comptroller of HM Household	Jeremy Quin	July 2019 – December 2019
Whip; Vice-Chamberlain of the Household	Stuart Andrew	July 2019 – February 2020
Whips; Lords Commissioners of the Treasury	Colin Clark (jointly with Scotland Office) (unpaid)	July 2019 – December 2019
Whips; Lords Commissioners of the Treasury	Michelle Donelan	July 2019 – February 2020
Whips; Lords Commissioners of the Treasury	Mike Freer	July 2019 – December 2019
Whips; Lords Commissioners of the Treasury	Rebecca Harris	July 2019 – July 2022
Whips; Lords Commissioners of the Treasury	David Rutley	July 2019 – September 2021
Whips; Lords Commissioners of the Treasury	Nus Ghani (jointly with Transport)	July 2019 – February 2020
Whips; Lords Commissioners of the Treasury	Maggie Throup (unpaid)	September 2019 – September 2021
Assistant Whips	Kevin Foster (jointly with Cabinet Office until Oct 2019, and Wales)	July 2019 – December 2019
Assistant Whips	Leo Docherty	July 2019 – April 2021
Assistant Whips	Nigel Huddleston	July 2019 – September 2021
Assistant Whips	Marcus Jones	July 2019 – February 2020
Assistant Whips	James Morris	July 2019 – September 2021
Assistant Whips	Tom Pursglove	July 2019 – December 2019
Assistant Whips	Iain Stewart	July 2019 – December 2019

House of Lords Whips
Captain of the Honourable Corps of Gentlemen-at-Arms; Government Chief Whip in the House of Lords	Henry Ashton, 4th Baron Ashton of Hyde	July 2019 – December 2019
Captain of the Yeomen of the Guard; Deputy Government Chief Whip	Patrick Stopford, 9th Earl of Courtown	July 2016 – December 2019
Whips; Baronesses and Lords in waiting	Elizabeth Berridge, Baroness Berridge (unpaid)	July 2019 – December 2019
Whips; Baronesses and Lords in waiting	Olivia Bloomfield, Baroness Bloomfield of Hinton Waldrist (unpaid)	July 2019 – December 2019
Whips; Baronesses and Lords in waiting	George Young, Baron Young of Cookham	July 2016 – August 2019
Whips; Baronesses and Lords in waiting	James Bethell, 5th Baron Bethell	July 2019 – December 2019
Whips; Baronesses and Lords in waiting	Carlyn Chisholm, Baroness Chisholm of Owlpen	August 2019 – December 2019

== Departures from the first Johnson ministry ==
This is a list of resignations from the first government formed by Prime Minister Boris Johnson. Since forming a government on 24 July 2019 after his appointment as prime minister, Johnson faced 4 resignations, including 2 cabinet ministers. This list omits sitting MPs who left the Conservative Party or had the whip withdrawn. It also discludes all ministers who resigned prior to Boris Johnson taking office as prime minister.

Minister (Cabinet members shown in bold)	Office	Date of resignation	Reason
George Young, Baron Young of Cookham (Note: Member of the House of Lords)	Lord-in-waiting Government whip	29 August 2019	Resigned in protest of Boris Johnson's plans to prorogue parliament.
Jo Johnson	Minister of State for Universities, Science, Research and Innovation	5 September 2019	Stated he was "torn between family and national interest".
**Amber Rudd**	Secretary of State for Work and Pensions	7 September 2019	Resigned over Boris Johnson's "purge" of the party and his "failure" to pursue a deal with the EU.
**Alun Cairns**	Secretary of State for Wales	6 November 2019	Resigned following claims he had known about a former aide's role in the "sabotage" of a rape trial.

== See also ==
- Johnson cabinets, of Boris Johnson as Mayor of London
- Second Johnson ministry

== Notes ==
Preceded by Second May ministry	Government of the United Kingdom; 2019	Succeeded by Second Johnson ministry
