= Jo Cox Commission on Loneliness =

British government commission

The Jo Cox Commission on Loneliness was an establishment set up by British Member of parliament Jo Cox, in order to investigate ways to reduce loneliness in the United Kingdom. It published its final report at the end of 2017. While only running for just over a year, the commission led to the UK government making a lasting commitment to loneliness relief.

== History ==
The commission was established by Jo Cox shortly before her assassination in the summer of 2016. It was always intended to be a cross-party endeavour, with the Tory MP Seema Kennedy a leading member from the start. In January 2017 the commission was re-launched by Kennedy and the Labour MP Rachel Reeves; the two went on to serve as co-chairs of the commission. Working together with 13 charities, including Age UK and Action for Children, the commission produced a report outlining ways to combat loneliness in the UK. With Jo having planned for the commission to only run for one year, the commission was wound up in early 2018, shortly after producing its final report.

== Final report ==
The final report was released in December 2017 and had recommendations in three areas:

- National leadership, including the nomination of a lead minister.
- Measurement, involving developing a national indicator and annual reporting.
- Funding, for unspecified initiatives.

The report made clear that government alone would not be able to solve the problem of loneliness, with the commission also calling for action from other public sector leaders, business leaders, community and volunteer groups and regular citizens.

== Aftermath ==
Cox's friend Rachel Reeves continued to lead an all party group working on loneliness even after the commission was wound up. As of 2020 The Jo Cox Foundation still works on the problem of loneliness in partnership with government and with other charities.

In January 2018, prime minister Theresa May accepted the final report's recommendations, creating a ministerial lead for loneliness, with the intention that the new role will ensure loneliness reduction remains an enduring parliamentary priority. The position is often referred to by the media as the 'Minister for Loneliness', though it is not a separate ministerial office. Initially the role was an expansion of the remit for the Minister for Sport and Civil Society. The post was first held by Tracey Crouch, followed by Mims Davies who served from November 2018 to July 2019. From July 2019 to September 2021, the role was held by Baroness Barran, and is now currently held by Stuart Andrew. In October 2018, again as a result of the final report, the UK government became the first in the world to publish a loneliness reduction strategy. The strategy included commitments for loneliness reduction activity by nine different government departments; for example to encourage "social prescribing" by front line doctors, so that they can refer patients suffering from loneliness to local group activity & befriending schemes. As of May 2020, the UK government has distributed over £20 million to various initiatives to reduce loneliness. This initiative includes funding to charities dedicated to combatting loneliness, and to loneliness reduction projects run by both tech firms and community groups.
