= Deborah Stedman-Scott, Baroness Stedman-Scott =

English politician (born 1955)

The Right Honourable The Baroness Stedman-Scott OBE DL FRSA
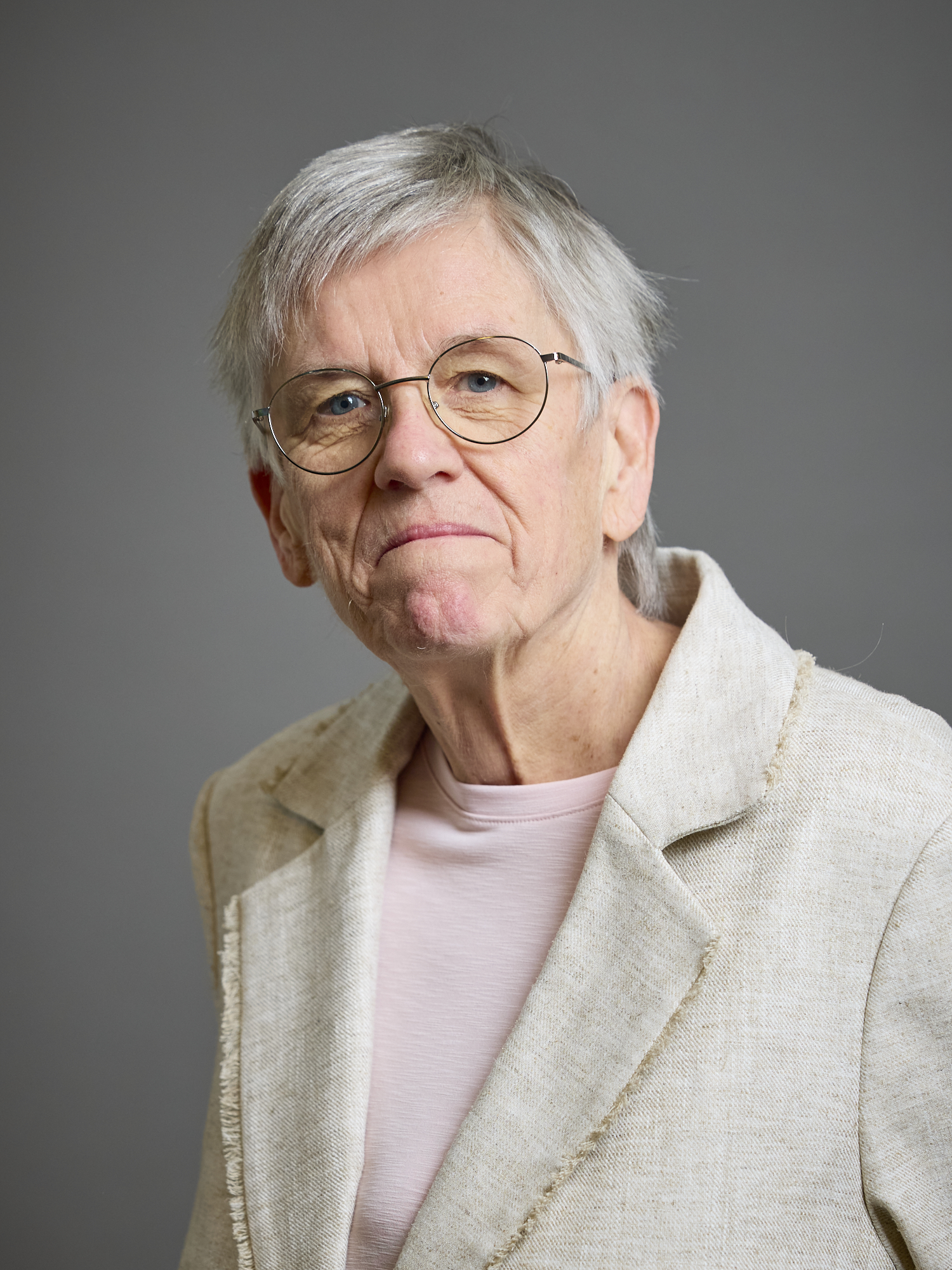
- Official portrait, 2025

Shadow Minister for Women and Equalities
- In office 11 November 2024 – 4 June 2026
- Leader: Kemi Badenoch
- Preceded by: The Baroness Barran
- Succeeded by: The Baroness Cash

Opposition Whip
- Incumbent
- Assumed office 11 November 2024
- Leader: Kemi Badenoch

Shadow Minister for Work and Pensions
- Incumbent
- Assumed office 1 September 2024
- Leader: Rishi Sunak; Kemi Badenoch
- Preceded by: The Viscount Younger of Leckie

Parliamentary Under-Secretary of State for Work and Pensions
- In office 30 July 2019 – 1 January 2023
- Prime Minister: Boris Johnson; Liz Truss; Rishi Sunak
- Preceded by: The Baroness Buscombe
- Succeeded by: The Viscount Younger of Leckie

Parliamentary Under-Secretary of State for Equalities
- In office 22 September 2022 – 27 October 2022
- Prime Minister: Liz Truss
- Preceded by: Amanda Solloway
- Succeeded by: Stuart Andrew

Parliamentary Under-Secretary of State for Women
- In office 17 September 2021 – 22 September 2022
- Prime Minister: Boris Johnson
- Preceded by: The Baroness Berridge
- Succeeded by: Katherine Fletcher

Baroness-in-Waiting Government Whip
- In office 27 October 2017 – 30 July 2019
- Prime Minister: Theresa May
- Preceded by: The Baroness Sugg
- Succeeded by: The Baroness Berridge

Member of the House of Lords
- Lord Temporal
- Life peerage 12 July 2010

Personal details
- Born: Deborah Scott; 23 November 1955 (age 70)
- Citizenship: United Kingdom
- Party: Conservative

Deborah Stedman-Scott, Baroness Stedman-Scott, OBE, DL, FRSA (born 23 November 1955) is a Conservative member of the House of Lords and the former Chief Executive Officer of Tomorrow's People Trust. She has been Shadow Minister for Work and Pensions and Shadow Minister for Women and Equalities since 2024. She previously served in the government as Parliamentary Under-Secretary of State for Work and Pensions from 2019 until 2023.

== Early life and education ==
Born in Paddington, London, she is the daughter of Jack and Doreen Margaret Scott and was educated at Ensham Secondary School for Girls, Southwark Technical College and the Salvation Army Training College.

== Career ==
Stedman-Scott has worked for National Westminster Bank 1972–1976, for the Salvation Army 1978–83 and for Tunbridge Wells Chamber of Commerce 1983–84. She joined Tomorrow's People Trust in 1984, a charity working with unemployed people. She held various roles there, rising through the ranks to become Chief Executive from 2005 to 2015.

She was appointed a Deputy Lieutenant for East Sussex in 2007.

On 12 July 2010, Stedman-Scott was created a life peer as Baroness Stedman-Scott, of Rolvenden in the County of Kent. She was appointed to be a government whip (Baroness-in-Waiting) on 27 October 2017.

On 30 July 2019, Stedman-Scott was appointed Parliamentary Under-Secretary of State for Work and Pensions in the first Johnson ministry. On 17 September 2021, she took on additional responsibility as Parliamentary Under-Secretary of State for Women at the Foreign, Commonwealth and Development Office, in the second cabinet reshuffle of the second Johnson ministry.

In September 2024, Stedman-Scott was appointed Shadow Minister for Work and Pensions under Rishi Sunak. She was appointed an Opposition Whip and Shadow Minister for Women and Equalities under Kemi Badenoch.

She is also a Trustee of New Devon Opera and New Philanthropy Capital.

== Awards and honors ==
- 2005: Charity Principal of the Year by The UK Charity Awards
- 2008: Officer of the Order of the British Empire (OBE) during the 2008 New Year Honours

== Personal life ==
She entered into a civil partnership with Gabrielle Joy Stedman-Scott in 2006.
