= Peta Buscombe, Baroness Buscombe =

British politician

The Right Honourable The Baroness Buscombe
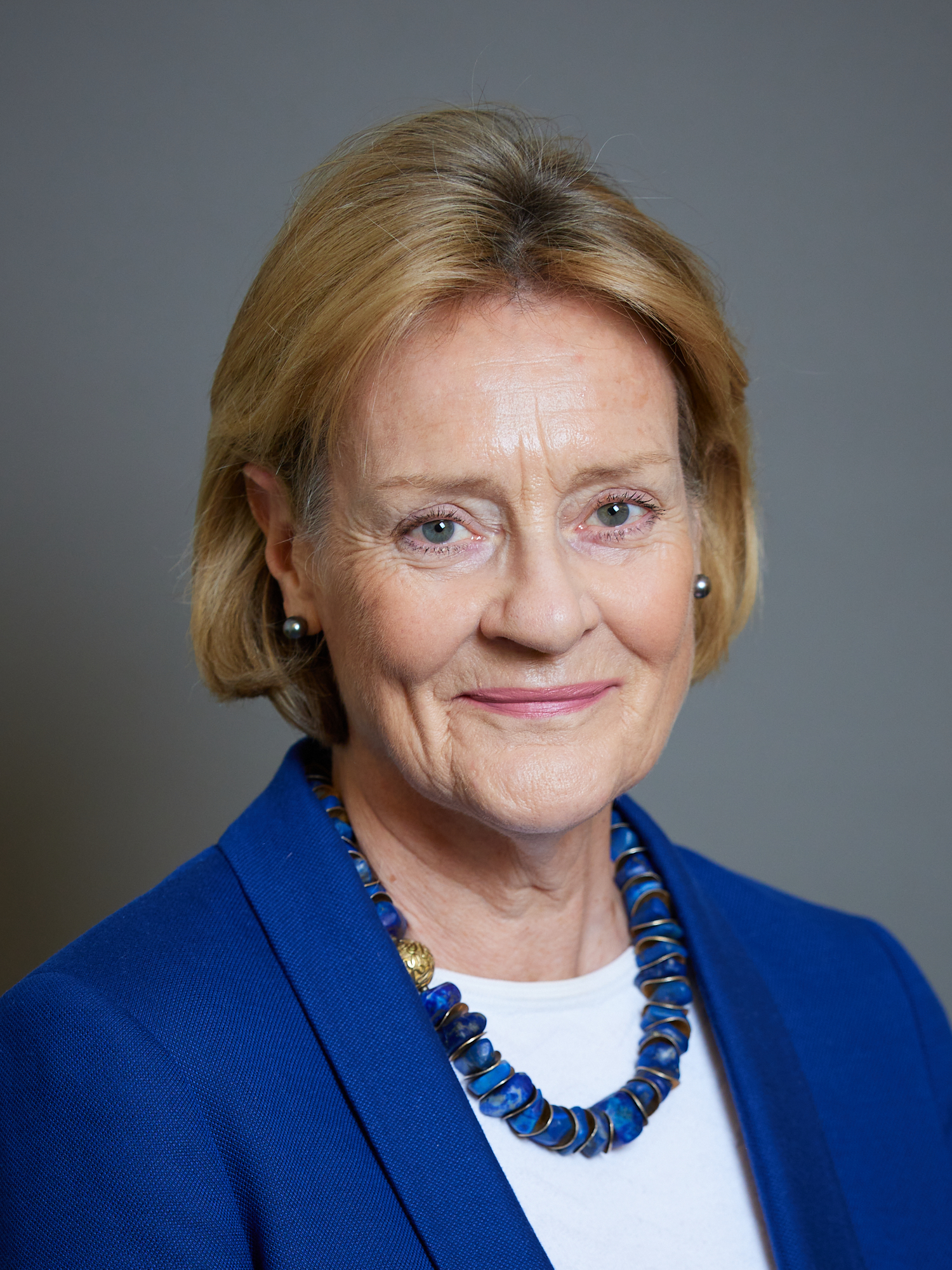
- Official portrait, 2022

Parliamentary Under-Secretary of State for Work and Pensions
- In office 11 June 2017 – 30 July 2019
- Prime Minister: Theresa May
- Preceded by: The Lord Henley
- Succeeded by: The Baroness Stedman-Scott

Baroness-in-Waiting Government Whip
- In office 21 December 2016 – 11 June 2017
- Prime Minister: Theresa May
- Preceded by: The Baroness Mobarik
- Succeeded by: The Baroness Sugg

Member of the House of Lords
- Lord Temporal
- Life peerage 23 July 1998

Personal details
- Born: 12 March 1954 (age 72)
- Party: Conservative
- Spouse: Philip Buscombe (m. 1980)
- Children: 3
- Education: Rosebery Grammar School; Inns of Court School of Law

Peta Jane Buscombe, Baroness Buscombe (née O'Flynn, born 12 March 1954) is an English barrister, regulator and politician. She is a Conservative member of the House of Lords. Lady Buscombe was Chief Executive of the Advertising Association from 2007 to 2009. She served as Chairman of the Press Complaints Commission from April 2009 until 16 October 2011.

== Early life and career ==
She was educated at Rosebery Grammar School, Epsom, and the Inns of Court School of Law. She was called to the Bar at the Inner Temple in 1977 and worked as a Legal Advisor for the Dairy Trade Federation from 1979 to 1980. She then worked as Legal Counsel for Barclays Bank International and Barclays Bank plc until 1984, after which she was Assistant Secretary for the Institute of Practitioners in Advertising until 1987. She was joint managing partner of Buscombe and Fiala, an international art business, from 1991 to 1995. She was a District Councillor for Nettlebed, Oxfordshire 1995 to 1999.

== Political career ==
She stood as the Conservative candidate in Slough at the 1997 General Election. She became Conservative party vice-chairman for development 1997 to 1999. Numerous positions as Shadow Minister or Lead spokesperson House of Lords 1999 to 2007 including Education and Skills; DCMS; Home, Constitutional and Legal Affairs; Cabinet Office; Social Security and Trade & Industry.

On 23 July 1998 she was created a Life peer as Baroness Buscombe, of Goring in the County of Oxfordshire. She has been a Conservative front bench spokesman in the House of Lords on several briefs including Business, Innovation and Skills; Culture, Media and Sport; Education; and Home Constitutional and Legal Affairs; and was also a member of the Joint Committee on Human Rights.

Her voting record has been summarised from Public Whip. She has voted moderately against introducing ID cards, more EU integration, a stricter asylum system and the hunting ban. She has voted in favour of taking steps to combat climate change. She voted moderately for greater autonomy for schools.

On 21 December 2016, she was appointed as Baroness in Waiting (i.e. government whip in the House of Lords). She was lead Spokesperson for DCMS, BEIS and MOI 2016 to 2017.

She became Government Minister for Work and Pensions, House of Lords, June 2017 – July 2019. During that time she was the small business champion, work and pensions. She represented the Department for Work & Pensions at UN Convention of Human Rights of Persons with Disabilities 2019, Seoul Winter Paralympics 2018, G7 Labour & Employment Ministers Meeting on Diversity in Employment and the Future of Work, Paris 2019, and G20 meeting on Equality in the Workplace and the Future of Work, Argentina 2018.

Numerous Committees in Parliament: including Digital and Communications Committee from 2019, Joint Committee for the National Security Strategy 2015 to 2017, Joint Committee on Human Rights 2015 to 2016.

== Professional career ==
She became Chief Executive of the Advertising Association from 2007 to 2009, where she led the implementation of the Change4Life campaign, a Government-sponsored scheme backed by consumer and media brands which was designed to tackle obesity across the UK. Marketing Week editor Stuart Smith described Buscombe as "the most formidable advocate the commercial communications sector has seen in years".

She became chair of the Press Complaints Commission in April 2009. During her chairmanship the Press Communications Commission faced significant criticism for its handling of the News of the World phone-hacking scandal. One national newspaper editor was quoted as saying the PCC’s response “was a disaster” and that “it was easy to run rings around Baroness Buscombe”. In November 2010 the Commission issued a formal apology in the High Court and paid £20,000 in libel damages to solicitor Mark Lewis, who represented phone-hacking victims; the settlement followed remarks Buscombe had made at the Society of Editors conference the previous year that were alleged to have implied Lewis had misled Parliament. She announced in July 2011 that she would not seek to extend her term as PCC chair beyond its expiration in early 2012, citing the need for a smooth transition, and stepped down from the role in October 2011 amid widespread criticism of the commission's handling of the phone-hacking scandal.

She was a non-executive director of Affinity Water plc (formerly Three Valleys Water) until 2015 and Local World until 2016, and was also chairman of the advisory board of Samaritans until 2017. She was inaugural Patron for The Sculpture in Schools Awards until 2008. She was a Trustee Index on Censorship 2015 to 2017.

She was a governor at Langley Hall Primary Academy in Langley, Berkshire, until 2016.

== Current appointments ==
She was elected Master Buscombe, Inner Temple, as an Other Governing Bencher in 2019.

== Personal life ==
She married Philip Buscombe in 1980. They have three children.

== Arms ==
Coat of arms of Peta Buscombe, Baroness Buscombe
Escutcheon Azure on a roundel per saltire Argent and Or a roundel per saltire Or and Argent the whole voided and interlaced with a bendlet per saltire Or and Argent and a bendlet sinister per saltire Argent and Or. Supporters On either side an otter reguardant sejant erect Argent gorged with a plain collar attached thereto a chain reflexed over the back Or. Motto Carpe Diem (Enjoy Today)
