= Elizabeth Berridge, Baroness Berridge =

British politician (born 1972)

The Right Honourable The Baroness Berridge
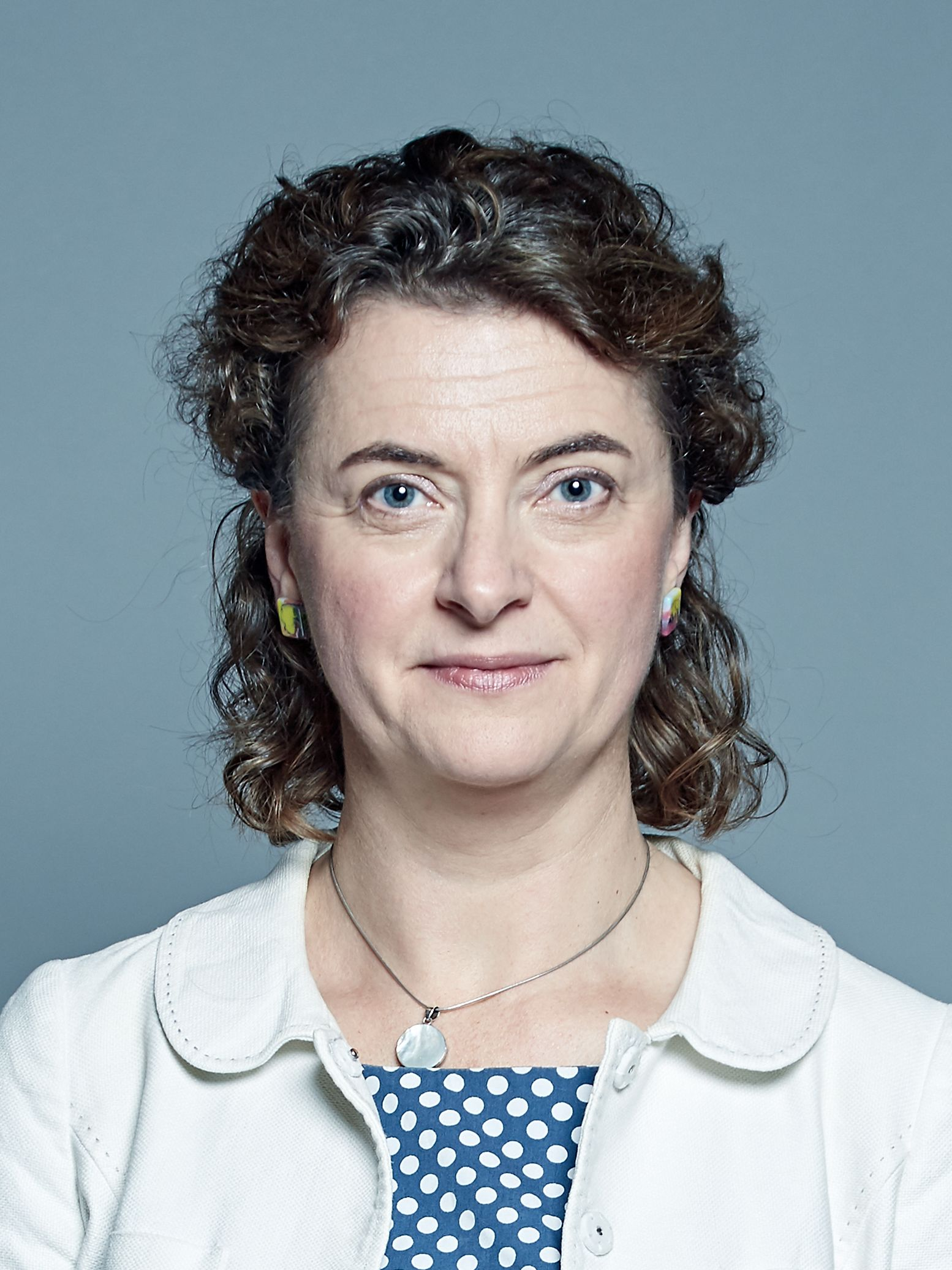

Parliamentary Under-Secretary of State for Women
- In office 14 February 2020 – 17 September 2021
- Prime Minister: Boris Johnson
- Preceded by: Victoria Atkins
- Succeeded by: The Baroness Stedman-Scott

Parliamentary Under-Secretary of State for the School System
- In office 13 February 2020 – 17 September 2021
- Prime Minister: Boris Johnson
- Preceded by: The Lord Agnew of Oulton
- Succeeded by: The Baroness Barran

Baroness-in-Waiting Government Whip
- In office 30 July 2019 – 13 February 2020
- Prime Minister: Boris Johnson
- Preceded by: The Baroness Stedman-Scott
- Succeeded by: The Viscount Younger of Leckie

Member of the House of Lords
- Lord Temporal
- Life peerage 18 January 2011

Personal details
- Born: Elizabeth Rose Berridge; 22 March 1972 (age 54) Rutland, England
- Party: Conservative
- Education: BA (Hons) Law
- Alma mater: Emmanuel College, Cambridge
- Occupation: Member of the House of Lords

Elizabeth Rose Berridge, Baroness Berridge (born 22 March 1972) is a British Conservative politician and member of the House of Lords.

== Life ==
Born and educated in the county of Rutland, Lady Berridge attended Vale of Catmose College and Rutland College in Oakham. She then studied law at Emmanuel College, Cambridge, and undertook barrister's training at the Inns of Court School of Law in London. Her professional career was as a barrister before she was appointed executive director of the Conservative Christian Fellowship in 2006.

She fought Stockport for the Conservatives in the 2005 general election.

Baroness Berridge is also part of the Advisory Council of the Foundation for Relief and Reconciliation in the Middle East which supports the work of Canon Andrew White, the "vicar of Baghdad".

She is a founding and steering committee member of the International Panel of Parliamentarians for Freedom of Religion or Belief.

== House of Lords ==
On 18 January 2011, Berridge was created a life peeress as Baroness Berridge, of The Vale of Catmose in the County of Rutland, and was introduced in the House of Lords on 20 January 2011. where she sits on the Conservative benches. Born in 1972, she was the second youngest female member of the House of Lords, after Baroness Lane-Fox of Soho.

She was co-chair of the All-Party Parliamentary Group for International Freedom of Religion or Belief.

Baroness Berridge was appointed Parliamentary Under-Secretary of State for the School System at the Department for Education, and Parliamentary Under-Secretary of State for Women at the Department for International Trade, by Prime Minister Boris Johnson in February 2020. She left the government during the cabinet reshuffle on 17 September 2021.

== Defender of freedom of religion or conviction ==
In 2014, Baroness Berridge was a founding member of the International Panel of Parliamentarians for Freedom of Religion or Belief (IPPFoRB) and served on its first Steering Committee.

In 2015, she also became Co-Director of the Commonwealth Initiative for Freedom of Religion or Belief (CIFoRB), a project that enables parliamentarians to address religious freedom issues through education, research and advocacy.

== Awards ==
On 5 October 2017, Baroness Berridge was awarded the 2017 International Religious Liberty Award by the International Center for Law and Religion Studies and J. Reuben Clark Law Society.

Political offices
Preceded by Lord Agnew	Parliamentary Under-Secretary of State for School System; 2020–present	Incumbent
Preceded by Victoria Atkins	Parliamentary Under-Secretary of State for Women; 2020–present	Incumbent
