= Olivia Bloomfield, Baroness Bloomfield of Hinton Waldrist =

British life peer (born 1960)

The Right Honourable The Baroness Bloomfield of Hinton Waldrist
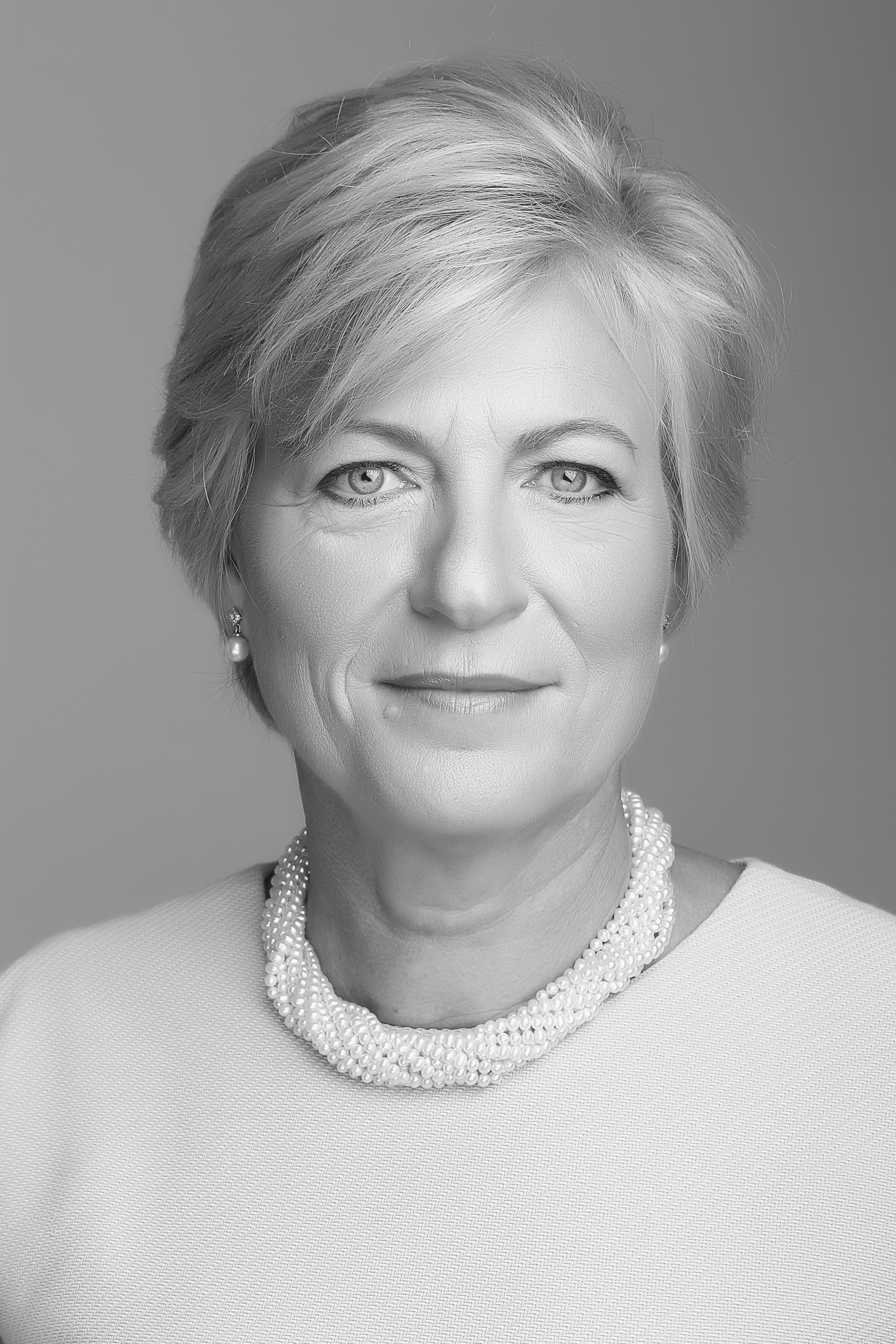
- Bloomfield in September 2019

Shadow Parliamentary Under-Secretary of State for Wales
- Incumbent
- Assumed office 30 November 2024
- Leader: Kemi Badenoch
- Preceded by: John Lamont

Baroness-in-Waiting Government Whip for Wales
- In office 30 July 2019 – 2 June 2023
- Prime Minister: Boris Johnson; Liz Truss; Rishi Sunak
- Preceded by: The Baroness Vere of Norbiton
- Succeeded by: The Lord Mott

Member of the House of Lords
- Lord Temporal
- Life peerage 5 September 2016

Personal details
- Born: 30 June 1960 (age 66)
- Party: Conservative
- Education: United World College of the Atlantic; St Hugh's College, Oxford

Olivia Caroline (nee Provis) Bloomfield, Baroness Bloomfield of Hinton Waldrist (born 30 June 1960) is a British life peer and member of the House of Lords.

== Early life and education ==
Born in Barry, Vale of Glamorgan and later brought up in Bonvilston (also in the Vale of Glamorgan), she was educated at United World College of the Atlantic and read Philosophy, Politics and Economics (PPE) at St Hugh's College, Oxford, graduating in 1979. Her late father was a steel worker in the steel works in Cardiff.

== Career ==
Bloomfield was a governor at The Cheltenham Ladies' College from 2003 to 2009. She has worked for Bank of America, and then as a headhunter with a company known as Russell Reynolds Associates.

Bloomfield has held a post as a magistrate. She is also Chairman of the Pump House Project, an arts and parkour centre in her home town of Faringdon. She was also, for a time, a partner at the Atlantic Superconnection Corporation, a fund which plans to build an electric cable between Iceland and the UK.

== Conservative Party ==
She was recruited by David Cameron and billionaire Michael Spencer - the Conservative treasurer from 2007 - 2010 - to work for the Conservative party at Conservative Campaign Headquarters from approximately 2007 to 2010, where she reported to both men. Her role was varied, but she was hired to help raise funds for the 2010 general election, which also meant dealing - and later clearing - with the party's then £8.5million deficit.

The Daily Mirror revealed that they believed The Leader's Group, a secretive group of high-value donors who had regular meetings with David Cameron, was run by Bloomfield.

In January 2018, British Investigative magazine Private Eye reported Bloomfield had been forced to admit she had overlooked a personal connection when she had praised the "high standards of reporting and transparency" of financial services offered in the Cayman Islands. According to the magazine, she was later forced to admit that "a close family member is a director of a financial services company domiciled in the Cayman Islands".

After eliminating the Conservative Party's deficit, she was nominated for a life peerage as part of David Cameron's Resignation Honours and was created Baroness Bloomfield of Hinton Waldrist, of Hinton Waldrist in the County of Oxfordshire, on 5 September 2016. During her maiden speech, she told the House of Lords that she was learning the Welsh language.

Since 2018, she has acted in support of U.S. nuclear small modular reactor company Terrestrial Energy, for which she received share options in 2018, now lapsed, and again in 2023.

In June 2023, she resigned from the Sunak ministry as a Lords Whip (Baroness in Waiting), following the bereavement of a family member.

In November 2024, Kemi Badenoch appointed her as Shadow Parliamentary Under-Secretary of State for Wales, succeeding John Lamont MP.

== Personal life ==
Bloomfield divides her time between Oxfordshire, London and Pembrokeshire.

Orders of precedence in the United Kingdom
Preceded by The Baroness Bertin	Ladies; Baroness Bloomfield of Hinton Waldrist	Followed by The Baroness Chakrabarti
