= Diana Barran, Baroness Barran =

British Conservative politician (born 1959)

The Right Honourable The Baroness Barran MBE
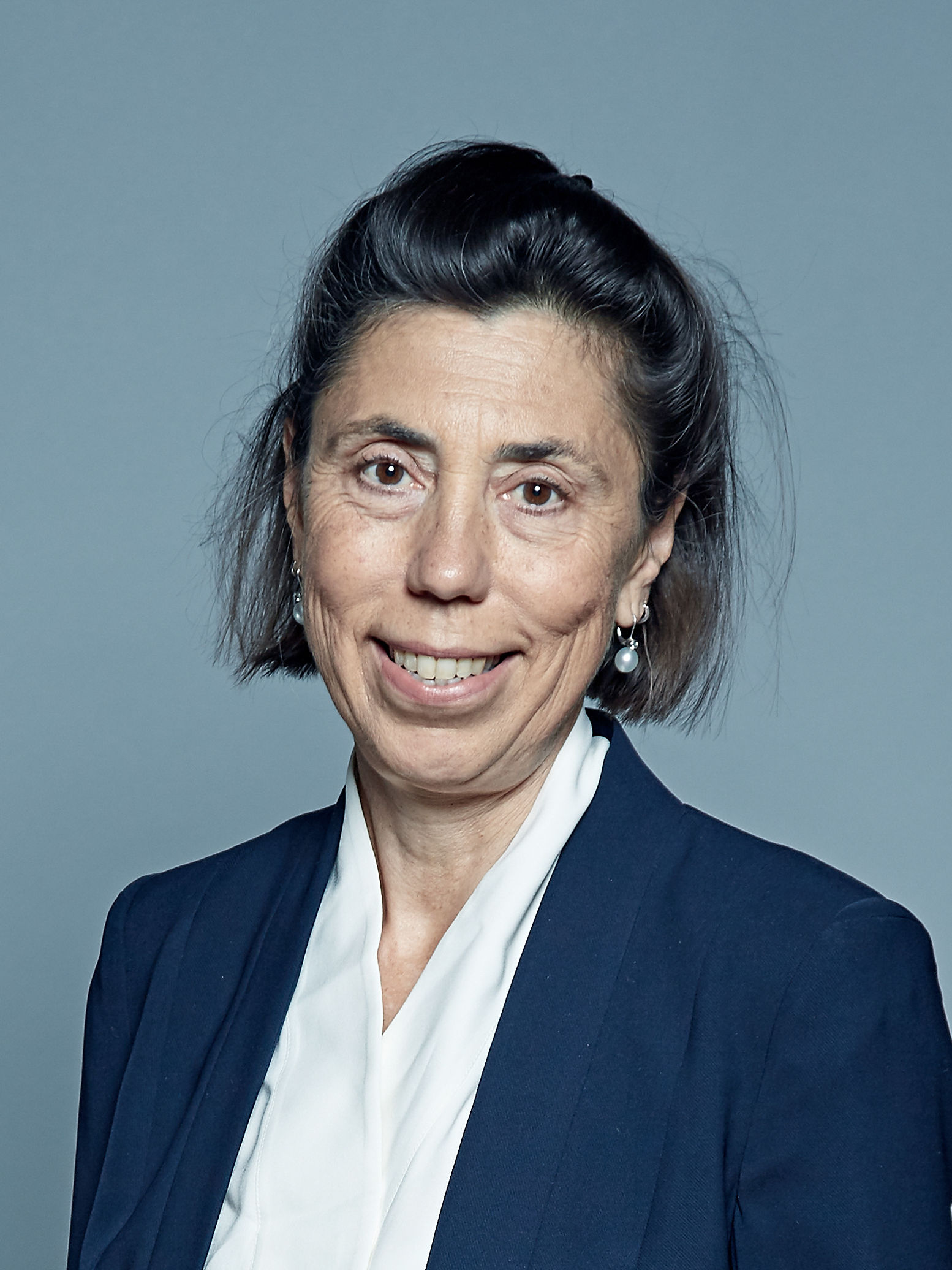
- Official portrait, 2018

Parliamentary Under-Secretary of State for the School System and Student Finance (Note: Parliamentary Under-Secretary of State for the School and College System from 17 September 2021 to 26 October 2022.)
- In office 17 September 2021 – 5 July 2024
- Prime Minister: Boris Johnson; Liz Truss; Rishi Sunak
- Preceded by: The Baroness Berridge
- Succeeded by: Office abolished

Parliamentary Under-Secretary of State for Civil Society
- In office 26 July 2019 – 17 September 2021
- Prime Minister: Boris Johnson
- Preceded by: The Lord Ashton of Hyde
- Succeeded by: Nigel Huddleston

Baroness-in-Waiting Government Whip
- In office 22 November 2018 – 26 July 2019
- Prime Minister: Theresa May
- Preceded by: The Baroness Manzoor
Shadow portfolios
Shadow Minister for Education
In office 1 September 2024 – 29 April 2026
Leader	Rishi Sunak; Kemi Badenoch
Shadow Minister for Women and Equalities
In office 1 September 2024 – 11 November 2024
Leader	Rishi Sunak
Succeeded by	The Baroness Stedman-Scott

Member of the House of Lords
- Lord Temporal
- Life peerage 21 June 2018

Personal details
- Born: 10 February 1959 (age 67)
- Party: Conservative
- Education: King's College, Cambridge

Diana Francesca Caroline Clare Barran, Baroness Barran (born Diana Francesca Caroline de Bosdari, 10 February 1959) is a British charity campaigner, former hedge fund manager and life peer. A member of the Conservative Party, she served in the government as Parliamentary Under-Secretary of State for Civil Society from 2019 to 2021 and as Parliamentary Under-Secretary of State for the School System from 2021 to 2024.

Barran is the founder of the domestic abuse awareness charity SafeLives and served as its chief executive from 2004 to 2017.

== Early life and education ==
Diana Barran attended Benenden School in Kent. She then studied at King's College, Cambridge, graduating with a bachelor's degree in history.

== Career ==
Her career in the finance industry began from 1980 to 1983 as an analyst and fund manager for Europe at Morgan Grenfell. Between 1983 and 1985, she managed funds for Europe at Lombard Odier International. From 1985 to 1990, Barran led the European equity research at Enskilda Securities in London and Paris. From 1990 to 1992, she served as the chief executive and head of European investments at Enskilda Asset Management. She founded the hedge fund Barran and Partners in 1993. Barran left Beaumont Capital in 2001 shortly before its sale to Schroders. Barran owned 10% of Beaumont Capital at the time of her departure.

Barran worked as an investment banker in London and Paris for Morgan Grenfell and Enskilda Asset Management and founded the hedge fund Barran and Partners in 1993. Barran left Beaumont Capital in 2001 shortly before its sale to Schroders. Barran owned 10% of Beaumont Capital at the time of her departure.

Barran is a former trustee of Comic Relief and a former chair of the Henry Smith Charity. Barran has worked as the head of grant development for New Philanthropy Capital and as the firms donor adviser.

On 26 July 2019, Barran was appointed Parliamentary Under-Secretary of State for Civil Society at the Department for Culture, Media and Sport in the first Johnson ministry. The role included responsibility for the department's business in the Lords and First World War commemorations.

Barran assumed the "loneliness portfolio" in 2019, taking on the role of "Minister of Loneliness" that former Prime Minister Theresa May established in 2018, which had previously been held by Tracey Crouch and Mims Davies. The position aimed to address the crisis of loneliness in British society that a 2017 commission initiated by Jo Cox had investigated. According to the British Red Cross, more than 9 million people in the UK feel lonely.

On 17 September 2021, Barran was appointed Parliamentary Under-Secretary of State for the School System at the Department for Education, in the second cabinet reshuffle of the second Johnson ministry. She was reappointed to this position by Liz Truss. She was reappointed by Rishi Sunak but the portfolio changed to Parliamentary Under-Secretary of State for the School System and Student Finance. She served in the shadow frontbench under Sunak and Kemi Badenoch from September 2024 to April 2026.

== Personal life ==
Barran is married with four children. Her husband is Julian Barran, an art-dealer and collector. He was an auctioneer for many years at Sotheby's and specialized in Diaghilev and Ballets Russes sales. For 2019, he was a Joint Patron of the Holburne Museum in Bath.

== Honours and awards ==
In the 2011 Birthday Honours, Barran was appointed a Member of the Order of the British Empire (MBE).

In May 2018, it was announced that she will be conferred a life peerage. On 21 June, she was created Baroness Barran, of Bathwick in the City of Bath.

In 2022, she received an Honorary Doctorate of the University (DUniv) from the University of Bath.

Barran was on the list of the BBC's 100 Women announced on 23 November 2020.

== Notes ==
Political offices
Preceded by Mims Davies	Parliamentary Under-Secretary of State for Civil Society and Loneliness; 2019–present	Incumbent
