= Theodore Agnew, Baron Agnew of Oulton =

British businessman, Conservative life peer (born 1961)

The Right Honourable The Lord Agnew of Oulton DL
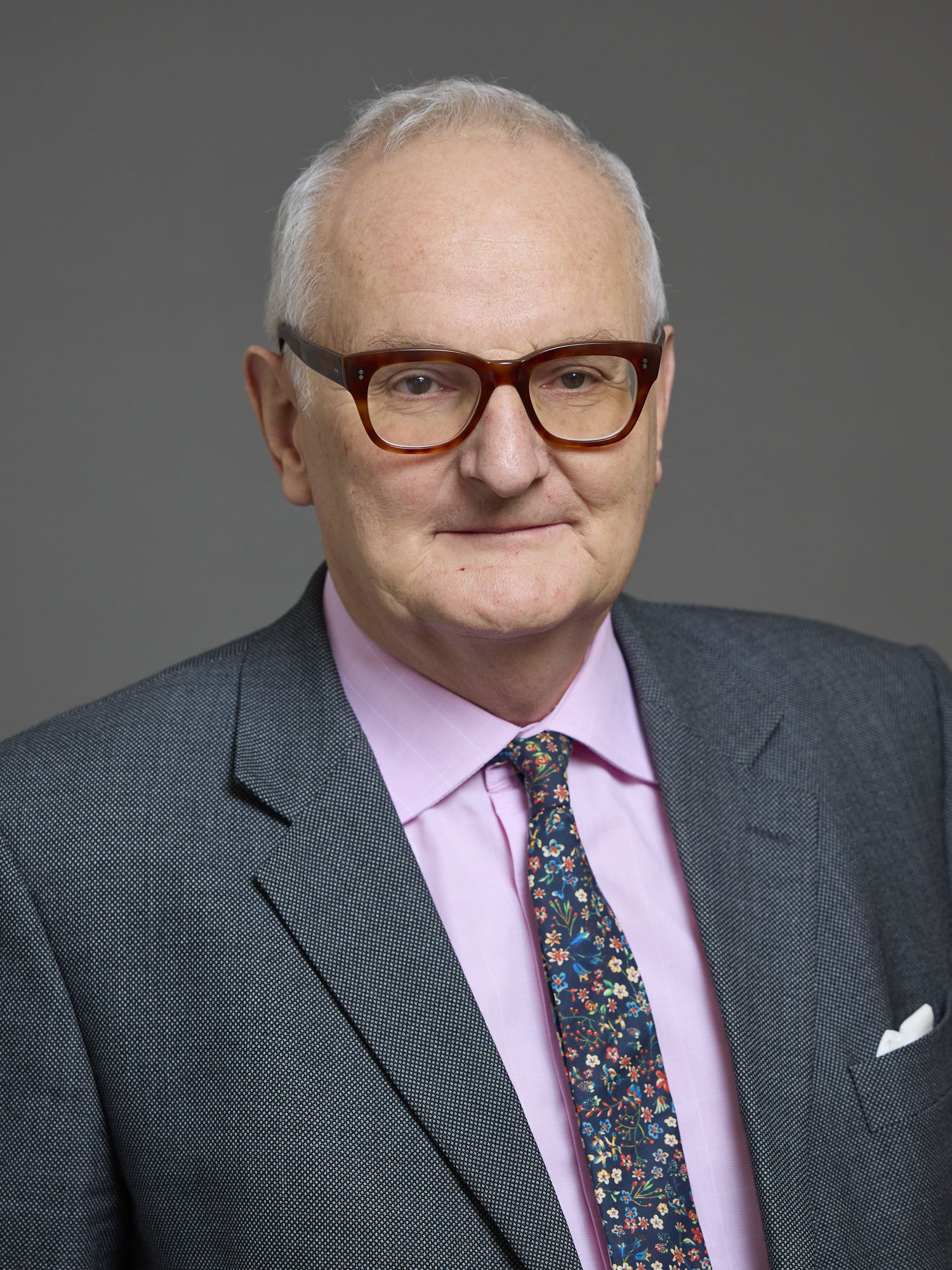
- Official portrait, 2025

Minister of State for Efficiency and Transformation
- In office 14 February 2020 – 24 January 2022
- Prime Minister: Boris Johnson
- Preceded by: Office established
- Succeeded by: Jacob Rees-Mogg (Note: As Minister of State for Brexit Opportunities and Government Efficiency.)

Parliamentary Under-Secretary of State for School System
- In office 28 September 2017 – 14 February 2020
- Prime Minister: Theresa May; Boris Johnson
- Preceded by: The Lord Nash
- Succeeded by: The Baroness Berridge

Member of the House of Lords
- Lord Temporal
- Life peerage 19 October 2017

Personal details
- Born: 17 January 1961 (age 65) Norfolk, England
- Party: Conservative
- Education: Beeston Hall School; Rugby School

Theodore Thomas More Agnew, Baron Agnew of Oulton (born 17 January 1961) is a British businessman, Conservative life peer, and former Minister of State at the Cabinet Office and HM Treasury. He is the founder and current chairman of the board of Inspiration Trust, an academy trust in Norfolk and Suffolk.

== Early life ==
He was born in Norfolk, the 6th of 7 children, brought up in Oulton near Aylsham and educated at Beeston Hall School and Rugby School. After school, he worked in Canada and Australia between 1978 and 1988, initially in farming but later buying and selling a variety of businesses.

== Business career ==
After working in Australia, he returned to the UK and founded Town & Country Assistance in 1989, later becoming WNS Assistance. He grew the business to annual gross revenues of £40 million. Selling it to Warburg Pincus in 2002, he became a co-founder of WNS Global Services. This company was floated on the New York Stock Exchange in 2006.

In 2004, he became Chief Executive Officer of Jubilee Managing Agency Ltd, a Lloyd's insurance business managing £130 million of premiums. He resigned in 2011 after it was sold to Ryan Specialty.

== Education and Community ==
In 2006, he founded the Public Interest Foundation, a grant-giving charity primarily focused on education and communities.

He was chairman of the Norfolk Community Foundation between 2007 and 2013.

In 2006 he became a trustee of Policy Exchange, a Westminster-based think tank, and remained on the board until 2014.

Agnew is the founder and chairman of the Inspiration Trust, a multi-academy trust that runs seventeen schools in East Anglia. The Trust was founded as the East Norfolk Academy Trust on 14 August 2012, changing its name to the Inspiration Trust on 27 January 2013. He returned as chairman in 2022 after serving in the Government.

Agnew was a board member of the Education Policy Institute, a Westminster-based research institute, between 2015 and 2017.

He was appointed a director of National Institute of Teaching (NIoT) in 2022. The aim of NIoT is to boost the quality of teaching and school leadership by carrying out research applying these insights to its professional development programmes, and sharing findings with the sector.

== Party career ==
Theodore Agnew joined James Goldsmith's Referendum Party sometime before the 1997 General Election and attempted to get elected as their Prospective Parliamentary Candidate for the Ipswich constituency.

Agnew donated a total of £134,000 to the Conservative Party between 2007 and 2009.

He endorsed Kemi Badenoch in the July 2022 Conservative Party leadership election.

== Government ==
Agnew was a non-executive board member of the Department for Education from 2010 to 2015. He was chairman of its Academies Board from 2013 to 2015.

He was appointed lead non-executive board member of the Ministry of Justice in July 2015 until September 2017.

=== Education minister ===
Agnew was appointed as Parliamentary Under-Secretary of State for the School System, in the Department for Education, on 28 September 2017. He had an interest in improving the cost base of schools. He was created Baron Agnew of Oulton, of Oulton in the county of Norfolk, on 19 October 2017, sitting with the Conservative Party group in the House of Lords.

He had an interest in improving the cost base of schools and was responsible for the academies and free schools programs.

=== Treasury/Cabinet Office Minister ===
Agnew became Minister of State for Efficiency and Transformation jointly at the Cabinet Office and HM Treasury on 14 February 2020.

Agnew had a senior role in the UK's vaccination effort during the COVID-19 pandemic. He referred two companies to the PPE fast or VIP lane: Worldlink Resources, advised by former MP Brooks Newmark, which gained contracts for £258 million, and Uniserve, which gained an additional contract for £304 million. In April 2021 he was accused of a conflict of interest over his shares in Public Group, a firm helping companies bid for government contracts.

On 24 January 2022, Agnew resigned as Minister of State for Efficiency and Transformation after strongly criticising the government's failure to tackle billions of pounds worth of fraud in the Coronavirus Bounce Back Loan Scheme. Agnew said "a combination of arrogance, indolence and ignorance" was "freezing the government machine". Agnew accused the government of making "schoolboy errors" through giving loans to more than 1,000 companies which were not trading when the pandemic happened.

== Honours ==
Agnew was appointed a deputy lieutenant (DL) of Norfolk in 2013. He was made a Knight Bachelor in the 2015 New Year Honours "for services to education".

== Notes ==
Political offices
Preceded by The Lord Nash	Parliamentary Under-Secretary of State for the School System; 2017–2020	Succeeded by The Baroness Berridge
Vacant Title last held by Phil Woolas as Minister of State for Borders and Immigration	Minister of State for Efficiency and Transformation; 2020–2022	Succeeded by Jacob Rees-Mogg as Minister of State for Brexit Opportunities and Government Efficiency
Orders of precedence in the United Kingdom
Preceded by The Lord Duncan of Springbank	Gentlemen; Baron Agnew of Oulton	Followed by The Lord Geidt
