= Charlotte Vere, Baroness Vere of Norbiton =

British politician (born 1969)

The Right Honourable The Baroness Vere of Norbiton
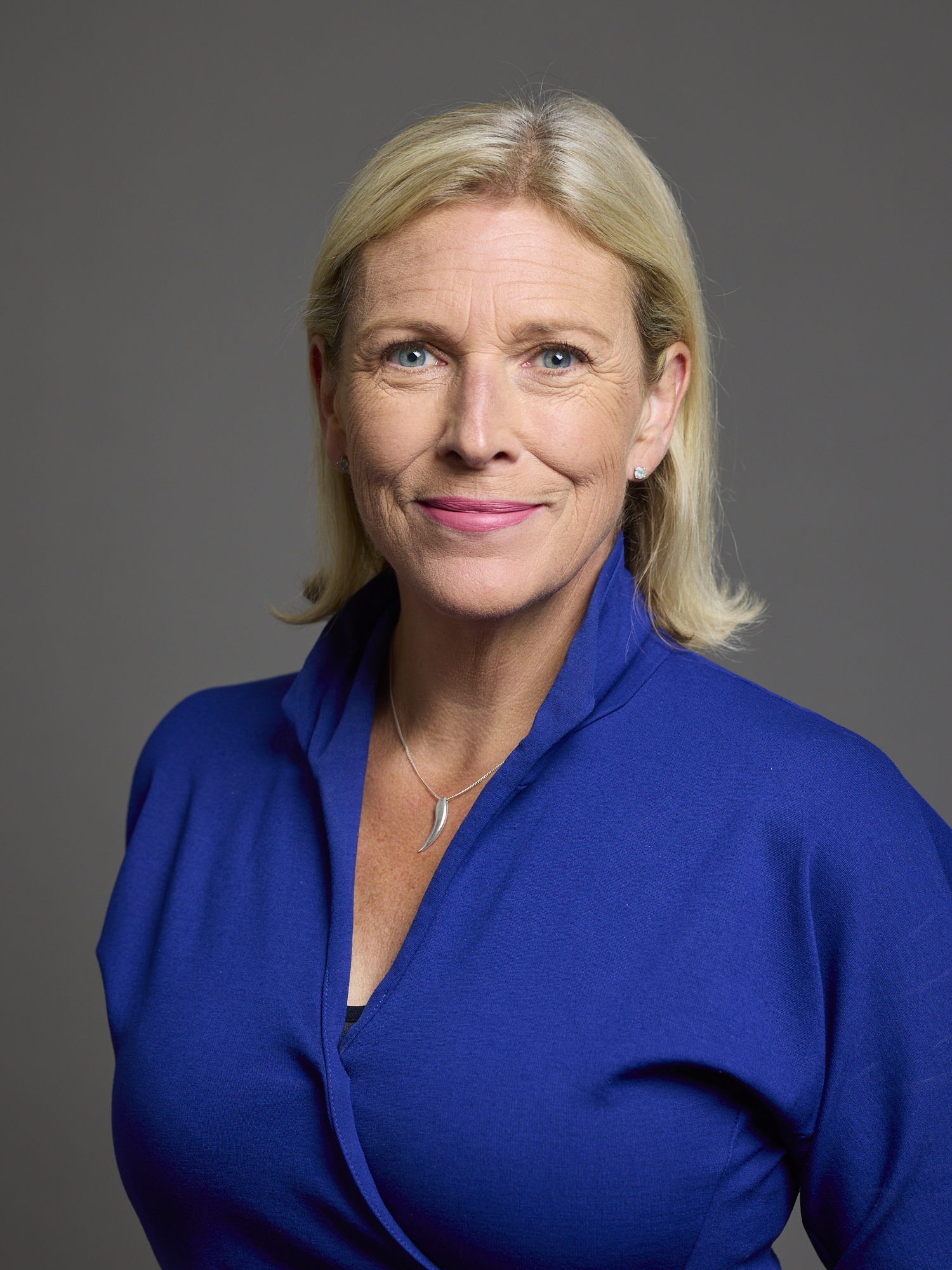
- Official portrait, 2024

Parliamentary Secretary for the Treasury
- In office 14 November 2023 – 5 July 2024
- Prime Minister: Rishi Sunak
- Preceded by: The Baroness Penn
- Succeeded by: Emma Reynolds

Parliamentary Under-Secretary of State for Aviation, Maritime and Security
- In office 23 April 2019 – 14 November 2023
- Prime Minister: Theresa May; Boris Johnson; Liz Truss; Rishi Sunak
- Preceded by: The Baroness Sugg
- Succeeded by: The Lord Davies of Gower

Baroness-in-Waiting Government Whip
- In office 21 December 2016 – 30 July 2019
- Prime Minister: Theresa May
- Preceded by: The Lord Henley
- Succeeded by: The Baroness Bloomfield of Hinton Waldrist

Member of the House of Lords
- Lord Temporal
- Life peerage 30 August 2016

Personal details
- Born: March 9, 1969 (age 57) Malacca, Malaysia
- Party: Conservative
- Spouse: Mike Chattey (m. 2016)
- Education: University College London; Northwestern University

Charlotte Sarah Emily Vere, Baroness Vere of Norbiton (born 9 March 1969) is a British Conservative politician and member of the House of Lords. She also served as a Parliamentary Secretary in HM Treasury and was executive director of the Girls' Schools Association from 2013 to 2016.

== Education ==
Vere is the eldest daughter of Colonel Roger Vere and of Karin Terry. She was educated at Stover School, University College London (BSc, 1989) and at the Kellogg School of Management at Northwestern University (MBA, 1997).

== Professional career ==
From to 2007 to 2009, Vere was CEO at social enterprise Big White Wall. Vere was Executive Director at Girls' Schools Association between 2012 and 2016.

== Political career ==
She was the Conservative candidate in the constituency of Brighton Pavilion at the 2010 general election. She finished third with 23.7 percent of the vote.

She served as a director of the "No to alternative voting" campaign during the UK's 2011 referendum on changing its voting system, later working as executive director of 'Conservatives In', an unsuccessful campaign supporting a remain vote in the 2016 European Union membership referendum.

She was nominated for a life peerage in the 2016 Prime Minister's Resignation Honours and was created Baroness Vere of Norbiton, of Norbiton in the Royal London Borough of Kingston upon Thames, on 30 August 2016.

On 21 December 2016, she was appointed as a Baroness in Waiting (i.e. government whip in the House of Lords) until 29 July 2019.

=== Department for Transport ===
She became a Parliamentary Under-Secretary of State in the Department for Transport on 23 April 2019.

Following changes in the Sunak ministry, on 2 November 2022, she became minister for shipping (maritime) in the Department for Transport. At the same time, she was confirmed as the Government transport spokesperson in House of Lords, with responsibility for aviation, space and local transport, including buses.

== See also ==
- Lord Vere of Hanworth
