= James Younger, 5th Viscount Younger of Leckie =

British peer (born 1955)

The Right Honourable The Viscount Younger of Leckie
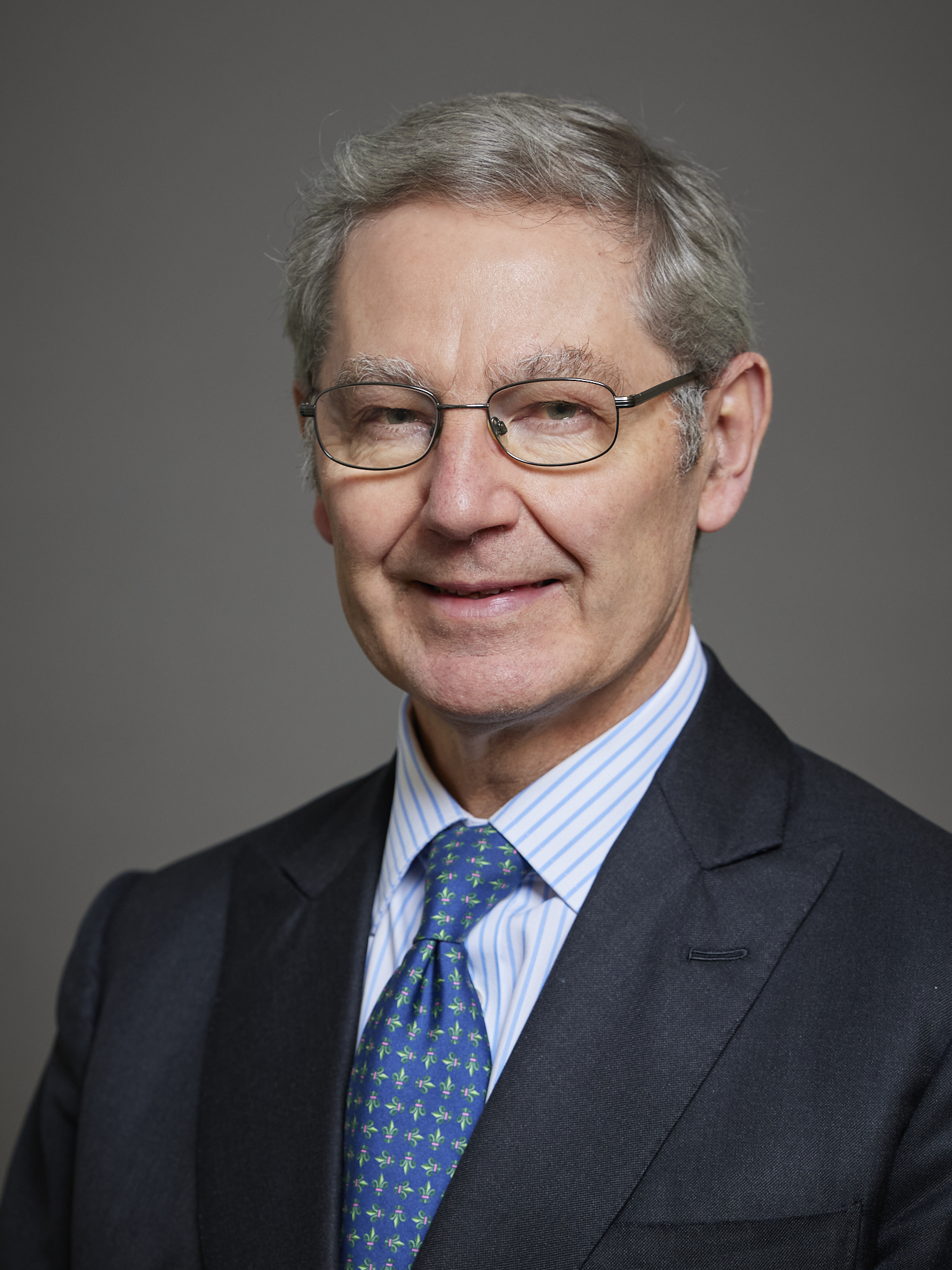
- Official portrait, 2023

Parliamentary Under-Secretary of State for Work and Pensions
- In office 1 January 2023 – 5 July 2024
- Prime Minister: Rishi Sunak
- Preceded by: The Baroness Stedman-Scott
- Succeeded by: The Baroness Sherlock

Lord-in-waiting Government Whip
- In office 13 February 2020 – 1 January 2023
- Prime Minister: Boris Johnson; Liz Truss; Rishi Sunak
- Preceded by: The Baroness Berridge
- Succeeded by: The Lord Evans of Rainow
- In office 14 May 2015 – 27 July 2019
- Prime Minister: David Cameron; Theresa May
- Preceded by: The Lord Wallace of Saltaire
- Succeeded by: The Lord Bethell
- In office 25 June 2012 – 9 January 2013
- Prime Minister: David Cameron
- Preceded by: The Lord de Mauley
- Succeeded by: The Lord Popat of Harrow

Parliamentary Under-Secretary of State for Faith and Communities
- In office 27 July 2019 – 13 February 2020
- Prime Minister: Boris Johnson
- Preceded by: The Lord Bourne of Aberystwyth
- Succeeded by: The Lord Greenhalgh

Parliamentary Under-Secretary of State for Intellectual Property
- In office 9 January 2013 – 17 July 2014
- Prime Minister: David Cameron
- Preceded by: The Lord Marland
- Succeeded by: The Baroness Neville-Rolfe
Shadow portfolio
Shadow Minister for Work and Pensions
In office 1 September 2024 – 29 April 2026
| Leader | Rishi Sunak; Kemi Badenoch |

Member of the House of Lords
- Lord Temporal
- Elected Hereditary Peer; 28 June 2010 – 29 April 2026
- By-election: 2010
- Preceded by: The 14th Earl of Northesk
- Succeeded by: Seat abolished

Personal details
- Born: 11 November 1955 (age 71)
- Party: Conservative
- Parent: George Younger, 4th Viscount Younger of Leckie
- Education: Winchester College
- Alma mater: University of St Andrews; Henley Management College
- Occupation: Businessman, politician

James Edward George Younger, 5th Viscount of Leckie (born 11 November 1955), is a former member of the House of Lords who served as an elected hereditary peer from 2010 to 2026. A member of the Conservative Party, he served in various ministerial and government roles under Prime Ministers David Cameron, Theresa May, Boris Johnson, Liz Truss, and Rishi Sunak between 2012 and 2024.

== Early life ==
James Younger was born on 11 November 1955. His father was George Younger, 4th Viscount Younger of Leckie, who was a prominent member of Margaret Thatcher's cabinet.

Younger was educated at Winchester College, where he was in the school football team, and the University of St Andrews, where he read medieval history. He holds an MBA from Henley Management College.

== Career ==
Younger now works in the field of personnel management and recruitment.

In June 2010, Younger won the by-election to replace the 14th Earl of Northesk who died in March 2010. Younger inherited his peerage in 2003, after passage of the House of Lords Act 1999, making him one of those excepted hereditary members of the House of Lords who was not a member before the act came into force.

Younger is a deputy chairman of the Buckingham Constituency Conservative Association.

On 25 June 2012, Younger was appointed a Lord-in-waiting (Lords Whip). On 9 January 2013, Lord Younger was appointed as Parliamentary Under Secretary of State for Intellectual Property at the Department for Business Innovation and Skills, by the Prime Minister.

On 27 July 2019, he was appointed Parliamentary Under-Secretary of State for Housing, Communities & Local Government in Boris Johnson's ministry.

On 1 January 2023, he was appointed Parliamentary Under-Secretary of State at the Department for Work and Pensions. He was a Shadow Minister for Work and Pensions until his removal from the House of Lords in April 2026.

Peerage of the United Kingdom
| Preceded by George Younger | Viscount Younger of Leckie; 2003–present | Incumbent; Heir apparent: Hon. Alexander Younger |
Parliament of the United Kingdom
| Preceded by The Earl of Northesk | Elected hereditary peer to the House of Lords under the House of Lords Act 1999; 2010–2026 | Position abolished under the House of Lords (Hereditary Peers) Act 2026 |
