= Liz Sugg, Baroness Sugg =

British politician and political adviser

The Right Honourable The Baroness Sugg CBE
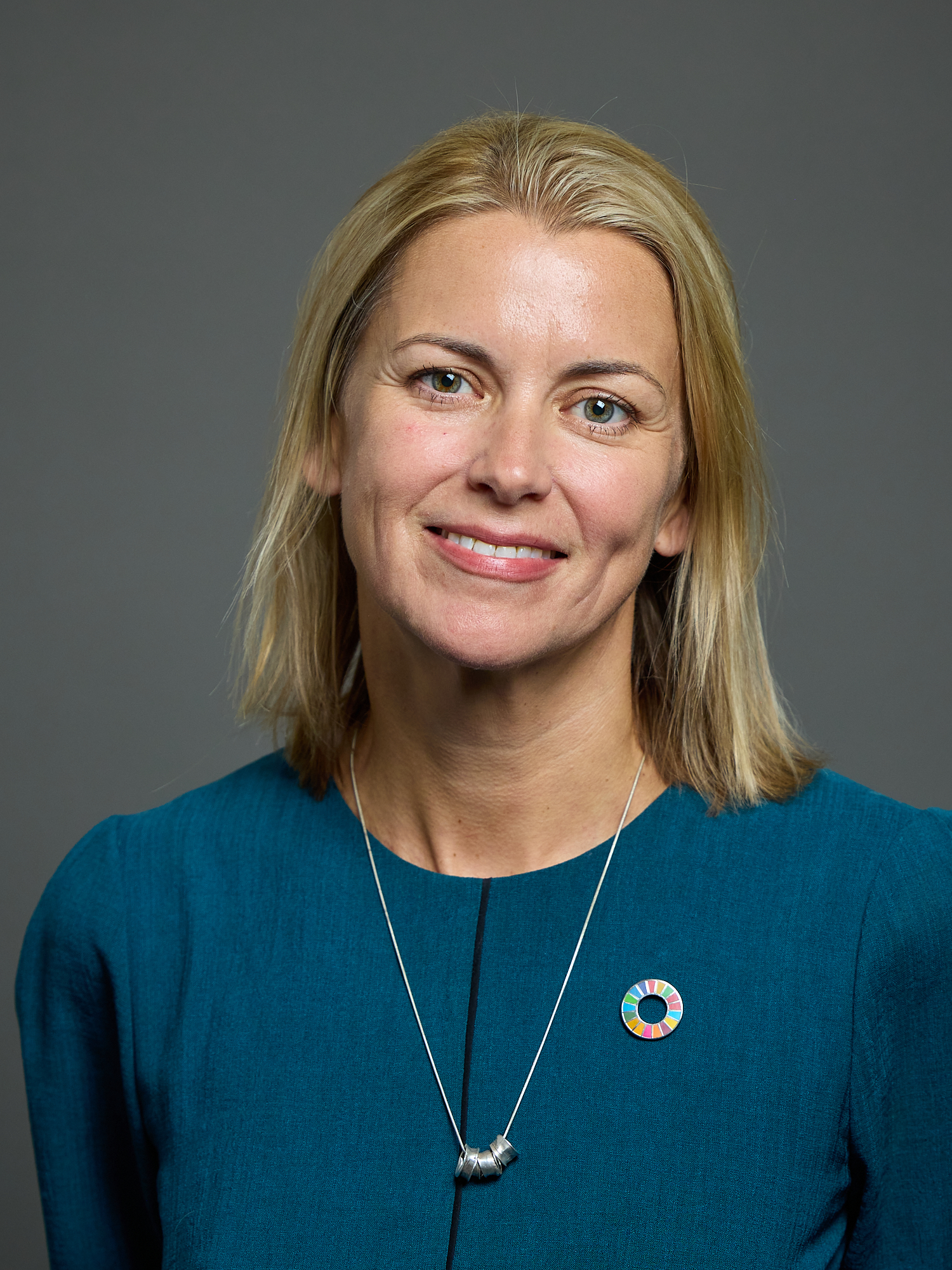
- Official portrait, 2025

Parliamentary Under-Secretary of State for Overseas Territories and Sustainable Development (Note: Sustainable Development (2019–February 2020)) (Note: Jointly with Department for International Development (2019–September 2020))
- In office 23 April 2019 – 25 November 2020
- Prime Minister: Theresa May; Boris Johnson
- Preceded by: The Lord Bates
- Succeeded by: Office abolished

Parliamentary Under-Secretary of State for Aviation
- In office 27 October 2017 – 23 April 2019
- Prime Minister: Theresa May
- Preceded by: The Lord Callanan
- Succeeded by: The Baroness Vere of Norbiton

Baroness-in-Waiting Government Whip
- In office 11 June 2017 – 27 October 2017
- Prime Minister: Theresa May
- Preceded by: The Baroness Buscombe
- Succeeded by: The Baroness Stedman-Scott

Member of the House of Lords
- Lord Temporal
- Life peerage 30 August 2016

Personal details
- Born: 2 May 1977 (age 49)
- Party: Conservative
- Education: Newcastle University

Elizabeth Grace Sugg, Baroness Sugg CBE (born 2 May 1977) is a British politician, life peer and political adviser. A member of the Conservative Party, she served as Parliamentary Under-Secretary of State for the Overseas Territories and Sustainable Development between February and November 2020.

== Education and career ==
Sugg grew up and went to school in Surrey attending Epsom College. She graduated from Newcastle University with a degree in Politics and Economics. Her mother, Deborah Sugg, worked for many years as parliamentary assistant to the prominent Conservative MP, Kenneth Clarke.

After working in Brussels as a press secretary for the Conservative MEPs, Sugg served as Head of Operations at 10 Downing Street under the premiership of David Cameron. She led the preparation of key international meetings hosted by the UK such as the G7 Summit in Lough Erne in 2013 and the NATO Summit 2014 in Wales. She was appointed a Commander of the Order of the British Empire (CBE) in the 2015 Dissolution Honours.

She was nominated for a life peerage in the 2016 Prime Minister's Resignation Honours and was created Baroness Sugg, of Coldharbour in the London Borough of Lambeth, on 30 August 2016.

Sugg was a government whip as a Baroness-in-Waiting from June to October 2017. She was then appointed Parliamentary Under-Secretary of State for Aviation at the Department for Transport on 27 October 2017, replacing Lord Callanan. From 23 April 2019 until the February 2020 reshuffle she was Parliamentary Under-Secretary of State for International Development. She was appointed Parliamentary Under-Secretary of State and Minister for the Overseas Territories and Sustainable Development on 13 February 2020, and Special Envoy for Girls' Education on 5 March 2020.

On 25 November 2020 she resigned from her ministerial role at the Foreign, Commonwealth and Development Office following the announcement by the Chancellor of the Exchequer, Rishi Sunak, that the overseas aid budget would be reduced.

On the appointment of David Cameron as Foreign Secretary, she became a Special Adviser to him.
