= Second Johnson ministry =

UK government from 2019 to 2022

- Cabinet of the United Kingdom
- 2019–2022
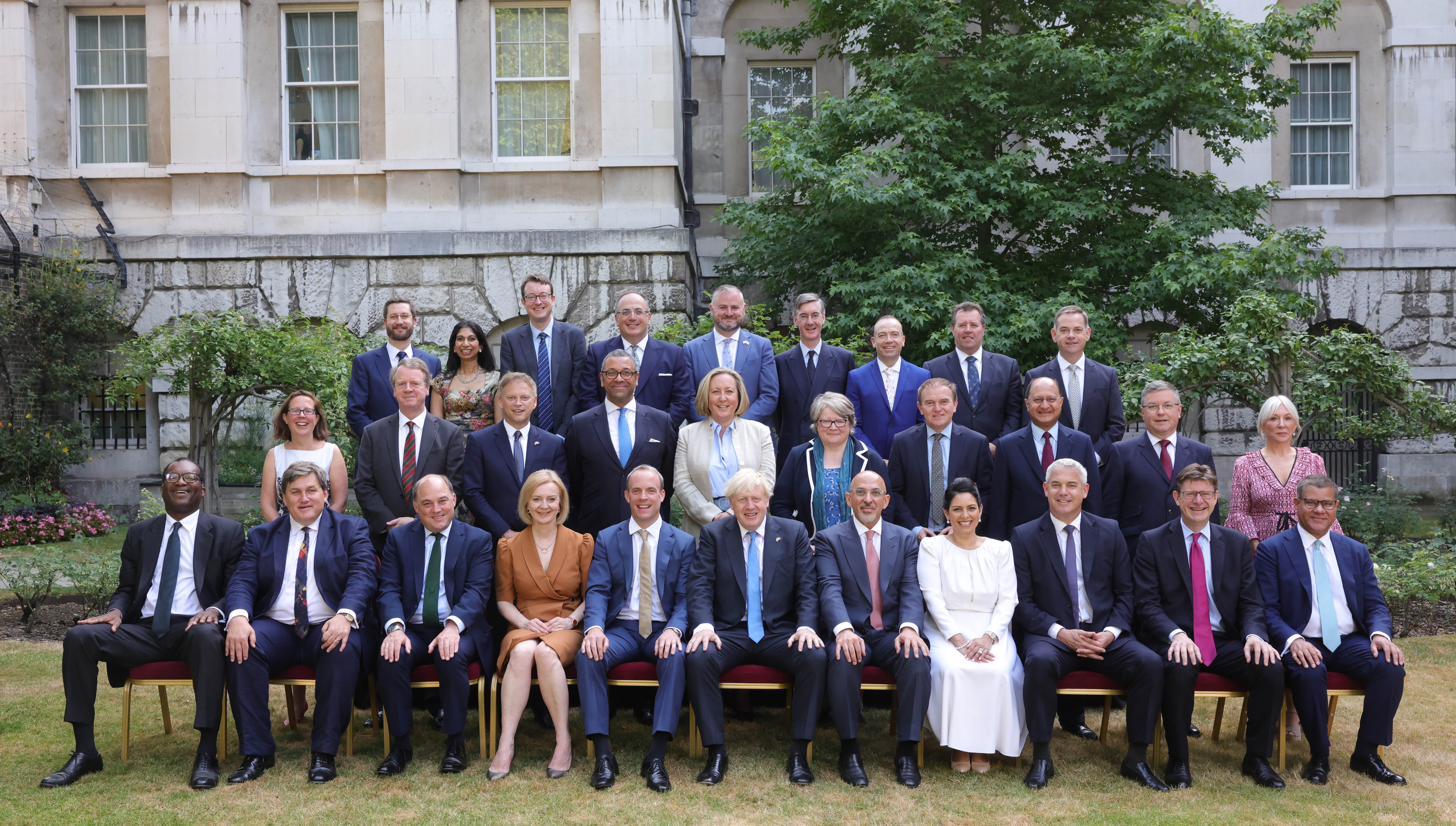
- Johnson's cabinet in July 2022
- Date formed: 16 December 2019
- Date dissolved: 6 September 2022

People and organisations
- Monarch: Elizabeth II
- Prime Minister: Boris Johnson
- Prime Minister's history: Premiership of Boris Johnson
- Deputy Prime Minister: Dominic Raab (2021–2022)
- First Secretary: Dominic Raab (2019–2021)
- No. of ministers: 120
- Member party: Conservative Party
- Status in legislature: Majority government
- Opposition cabinet: Corbyn shadow cabinet; Starmer shadow cabinet
- Opposition party: Labour Party
- Opposition leader: Jeremy Corbyn (2019–2020); Keir Starmer (2020–2022)

History
- Outgoing formation: Jul–Sep 2022 Conservative leadership election
- Election: 2019 general election
- Legislature terms: 2019–2024
- Budgets: 2020 budget; March 2021 budget; October 2021 budget
- Predecessor: First Johnson ministry
- Successor: Truss ministry

The second Johnson ministry began on 16 December 2019, three days after Boris Johnson's audience with Queen Elizabeth II where she invited him to form a new government following the 2019 general election. The Conservative Party was returned to power with a majority of 80 seats in the House of Commons. Initially the ministers were largely identical to those at the end of the first Johnson ministry, but changed significantly in cabinet reshuffles in February 2020 and September 2021.

In July 2022, following a government crisis as a result of dozens of resignations from his government, Johnson announced his resignation as leader of the Conservative Party. Johnson pledged to remain as prime minister and lead a 'caretaker' government until a new Conservative Party leader had been elected. The election results were revealed on Monday 5 September 2022, and the new leader Liz Truss became prime minister on 6 September, resulting in the cabinet's dissolution.

== History ==
=== 2019 to 2020 ===
The Conservative minority first Johnson ministry could not implement its legislative programme due to a political impasse over Brexit. While the Fixed-term Parliaments Act 2011 requires a two-thirds majority vote in parliament to trigger an election, Johnson bypassed this requirement by passing the Early Parliamentary General Election Act 2019. In the resulting election, held on 12 December 2019, Johnson's Conservatives won a majority of eighty seats, the largest for a government led by a Conservative prime minister since Margaret Thatcher in 1987.

Initially the ministers were largely identical to those at the end of the first Johnson ministry, excepting the Secretary of State for Wales, in which position Simon Hart replaced Alun Cairns. Nicky Morgan, who stood down at the general election, and Zac Goldsmith, who lost his seat, were made life peers to allow them to remain in the government.

Johnson reshuffled his cabinet on 13 February 2020: Sajid Javid, Julian Smith, Esther McVey, Geoffrey Cox, Andrea Leadsom, Theresa Villiers and Chris Skidmore all left the government.

Andrew Sabisky worked as a political adviser in Johnson's office for a short time in February. Sabisky, a speaker at the secretly held London Conference on Intelligence at UCL in 2015, believed that there were significant differences in average intelligence between different races, and supported enforced contraception. This caused concern among politicians of all parties in the UK Parliament only a few days after Sabisky's appointment. He resigned from his advisory role on 17 February 2020.

=== 2021 to 2022 ===
The 2021 State Opening of Parliament took place on 11 May 2021. Johnson conducted a cabinet reshuffle on 15 September 2021. The 2022 State Opening of Parliament took place on 10 May 2022. Johnson conducted another cabinet reshuffle on 7 July 2022. In January 2022 researchers at Sussex University maintained Johnson's administration was more corrupt "than any UK government since the Second World War" and feared serious consequences for the UK if it continued. Professor of Anti-Corruption Practice, Robert Barrington, at the Centre for the Study of Corruption at Sussex University stated that Johnson directly influenced this by personal example and by allowing his ministers and staff to do things. Barrington feared "consequences for democracy and Britain's global influence" – Barrington feared further for the economy and national security. Barrington accused MPs or ministers that failed to act against lack of integrity of enabling it. Simon Jenkins wrote "He could never handle rivals near him, and his dismissal of May's abler ministers deprived him, and the UK, of experience and ability in favour of second-rate acolytes."

==== Confidence vote and government crisis ====
On 6 June 2022, Boris Johnson faced a vote of confidence in his ministry. He won the vote, with 211 in favour of his premiership and 148 against. Johnson was politically weakened.

In July 2022, several ministers resigned from the government in response to the handling of the Chris Pincher scandal, including cabinet ministers Sajid Javid, Rishi Sunak and Simon Hart. Michael Gove was sacked for disloyalty.

==== Johnson's resignation ====
Following the resignations, Johnson announced on 7 July 2022 of his decision to step down as Conservative Party leader. Following the completion of the leadership election for his successor on 6 September, he stepped down and was succeeded by Liz Truss.

== Cabinets ==
=== December 2019 – February 2020 ===
Second Johnson Cabinet
Portfolio	Portrait	Minister	Term
Cabinet ministers
Prime Minister; First Lord of the Treasury; Minister for the Civil Service; Minister for the Union		Boris Johnson	2019–2022
Chancellor of the Exchequer		Sajid Javid	2019–2020
First Secretary of State; Secretary of State for Foreign and Commonwealth Affairs		Dominic Raab	2019–2021
Secretary of State for the Home Department		Priti Patel	2019–2022
Chancellor of the Duchy of Lancaster		Michael Gove	2019–2021
Secretary of State for Justice; Lord High Chancellor of Great Britain		Robert Buckland	2019–2021
Secretary of State for Exiting the European Union		Steve Barclay	2018–2020
Secretary of State for Defence		Ben Wallace	2019–2023
Secretary of State for Health and Social Care		Matt Hancock	2018–2021
Secretary of State for Business, Energy and Industrial Strategy		Andrea Leadsom	2019–2020
Secretary of State for International Trade; President of the Board of Trade		Liz Truss	2019–2021
Secretary of State for Work and Pensions		Thérèse Coffey	2019–2022
Secretary of State for Education		Gavin Williamson	2019–2021
Secretary of State for Environment, Food and Rural Affairs		Theresa Villiers	2019–2020
Secretary of State for Housing, Communities and Local Government		Robert Jenrick	2019–2021
Secretary of State for Transport		Grant Shapps	2019–2022
Secretary of State for Northern Ireland		Julian Smith	2019–2020
Secretary of State for Scotland		Alister Jack	2019–2024
Secretary of State for Wales		Simon Hart	2019–2022
Leader of the House of Lords; Lord Keeper of the Privy Seal		Natalie Evans, Baroness Evans of Bowes Park	2016–2022
Secretary of State for Digital, Culture, Media and Sport		Nicky Morgan, Baroness Morgan of Cotes	2019–2020
Secretary of State for International Development		Alok Sharma	2019–2020
Minister without Portfolio; Party Chairman		James Cleverly (unpaid)	2019–2020
Also attending cabinet meetings
Chief Secretary to the Treasury		Rishi Sunak	2019–2020
Leader of the House of Commons; Lord President of the Council		Jacob Rees-Mogg	2019–2022
Chief Whip of the House of Commons; Parliamentary Secretary to the Treasury		Mark Spencer	2019–2022
Attorney General		Geoffrey Cox	2018–2020
Minister of State for Business, Energy and Clean Growth		Kwasi Kwarteng	2019–2021
Minister of State for the Northern Powerhouse and Local Growth		Jake Berry	2019–2020
Minister of State for Housing and Planning		Esther McVey	2019–2020
Minister of State for Security; Deputy for EU Exit and No Deal Preparation		Brandon Lewis	2019–2020
Minister of State for Environment, Food and Rural Affairs; Minister of State for International Development		Zac Goldsmith, Baron Goldsmith of Richmond Park	2019–2022
Minister for the Cabinet Office; Paymaster General		Oliver Dowden	2019–2020

=== February 2020 – September 2021 ===
Third Johnson Cabinet
Portfolio	Portrait	Minister	Term
Cabinet ministers
Prime Minister; First Lord of the Treasury; Minister for the Civil Service; Minister for the Union		Boris Johnson	2019–2022
Chancellor of the Exchequer; Second Lord of the Treasury		Rishi Sunak	2020–2022
First Secretary of State		Dominic Raab	2019–2021
Secretary of State for Foreign and Commonwealth Affairs		Dominic Raab	2019–2020
Secretary of State for Foreign, Commonwealth and Development Affairs		Dominic Raab	2020–2021
Secretary of State for the Home Department		Priti Patel	2019–2022
Chancellor of the Duchy of Lancaster		Michael Gove	2019–2021
Minister for the Cabinet Office		Michael Gove	2020–2021
Secretary of State for Justice; Lord High Chancellor of Great Britain		Robert Buckland	2019–2021
Secretary of State for Defence		Ben Wallace	2019–2023
Secretary of State for Health and Social Care		Matt Hancock	2018–2021
Secretary of State for Health and Social Care		Sajid Javid	2021–2022
President for COP26		Alok Sharma	2021–2022
Secretary of State for Business, Energy and Industrial Strategy		Alok Sharma	2020–2021
Secretary of State for Business, Energy and Industrial Strategy		Kwasi Kwarteng	2021–2022
Secretary of State for International Trade; President of the Board of Trade; Minister for Women and Equalities		Liz Truss	2019–2021
Secretary of State for Work and Pensions		Dr Thérèse Coffey	2019–2022
Secretary of State for Education		Gavin Williamson	2019–2021
Secretary of State for Environment, Food and Rural Affairs		George Eustice	2020–2022
Secretary of State for Housing, Communities and Local Government		Robert Jenrick	2019–2021
Secretary of State for Transport		Grant Shapps	2019–2022
Secretary of State for Northern Ireland		Brandon Lewis	2020–2022
Secretary of State for Scotland		Alister Jack	2019–2024
Secretary of State for Wales		Simon Hart	2019–2022
Leader of the House of Lords; Lord Keeper of the Privy Seal		Natalie Evans, Baroness Evans of Bowes Park	2016–2022
Secretary of State for Digital, Culture, Media and Sport		Oliver Dowden	2020–2021
Secretary of State for International Development (post abolished Sept. 2020)		Anne-Marie Trevelyan	2020
Minister of State for the Cabinet Office		David Frost, Baron Frost	2021
Minister without Portfolio; Party Chairman		Amanda Milling (unpaid)	2020–2021
Also attending cabinet meetings
Chief Secretary to the Treasury		Steve Barclay	2020–2021
Leader of the House of Commons; Lord President of the Council		Jacob Rees-Mogg	2019–2022
Chief Whip of the House of Commons; Parliamentary Secretary to the Treasury		Mark Spencer	2019–2022
Attorney General for England and Wales; Advocate General for Northern Ireland		Suella Braverman	2020–2021; 2021–2022
Attorney General for England and Wales; Advocate General for Northern Ireland		Michael Ellis	2021

==== Changes ====
- Following the merger of the Department for International Development into the Foreign and Commonwealth Office in September 2020, the office of International Development Secretary was abolished. Anne-Marie Trevelyan accordingly left the Cabinet and the Secretary of State for Foreign and Commonwealth Affairs became the Secretary of State for Foreign, Commonwealth and Development Affairs.
- Lord Frost became a full member of the Cabinet as a Minister of State in the Cabinet Office on 1 March 2021.
- Suella Braverman became Minister on Leave on 2 March 2021 with Michael Ellis replacing her as Attorney General. Braverman returned to the post of Attorney General on 13 September the same year.
- Matt Hancock quit his post of Health Secretary on 26 June 2021 following the revelation that he had breached coronavirus social distancing guidance. He was replaced by Sajid Javid.

=== September 2021 – July 2022 ===
Fourth Johnson Cabinet
Portfolio	Portrait	Minister	Term
Cabinet ministers
Prime Minister; First Lord of the Treasury; Minister for the Union; Minister for the Civil Service		Boris Johnson	2019–2022
Deputy Prime Minister; Secretary of State for Justice; Lord High Chancellor of Great Britain		Dominic Raab	2021–2022
Chancellor of the Exchequer; Second Lord of the Treasury		Rishi Sunak	2020–2022
Secretary of State for Foreign, Commonwealth and Development Affairs; Minister for Women and Equalities		Liz Truss	2021–2022
Secretary of State for the Home Department		Priti Patel	2019–2022
Secretary of State for Defence		Ben Wallace	2019–2023
Secretary of State for Levelling Up, Housing and Communities; Minister for Intergovernmental Relations		Michael Gove	2021–2022
Secretary of State for Health and Social Care		Sajid Javid	2021–2022
Minister for the Cabinet Office		Steve Barclay	2021–2022
Chancellor of the Duchy of Lancaster		Steve Barclay	2021–2022
Downing Street Chief of Staff		Steve Barclay	2022
Secretary of State for Business, Energy and Industrial Strategy		Kwasi Kwarteng	2021–2022
President for COP26		Alok Sharma	2021–2022
Secretary of State for International Trade; President of the Board of Trade		Anne-Marie Trevelyan	2021–2022
Secretary of State for Work and Pensions		Thérèse Coffey	2019–2022
Secretary of State for Education		Nadhim Zahawi	2021–2022
Secretary of State for Environment, Food and Rural Affairs		George Eustice	2020–2022
Secretary of State for Transport		Grant Shapps	2019–2022
Secretary of State for Northern Ireland		Brandon Lewis	2020–2022
Secretary of State for Scotland		Alister Jack	2019–2024
Secretary of State for Wales		Simon Hart	2019–2022
Leader of the House of Lords; Lord Keeper of the Privy Seal		Natalie Evans, Baroness Evans of Bowes Park	2016–2022
Secretary of State for Digital, Culture, Media and Sport		Nadine Dorries	2021–2022
Minister of State for the Cabinet Office		David Frost, Baron Frost	2021
Minister without Portfolio (unpaid); Party Chairman		Oliver Dowden	2021–2022
Minister of State for Brexit Opportunities and Government Efficiency		Jacob Rees-Mogg	2022–2022
Also attending cabinet meetings
Chief Whip of the House of Commons; Parliamentary Secretary to the Treasury		Mark Spencer	2019–2022
Chief Whip of the House of Commons; Parliamentary Secretary to the Treasury		Chris Heaton-Harris	2022–2022
Chief Secretary to the Treasury		Simon Clarke	2021–2022
Leader of the House of Commons; Lord President of the Council		Jacob Rees-Mogg	2019–2022
Leader of the House of Commons; Lord President of the Council		Mark Spencer	2022–2022
Attorney General for England and Wales; Advocate General for Northern Ireland		Suella Braverman	2020–2021; 2021–2022
Minister of State for Crime and Policing		Kit Malthouse	2019–2022
Minister of State without Portfolio		Nigel Adams	2021–2022
Minister of State for Higher and Further Education		Michelle Donelan	2021–2022
Minister for the Cabinet Office		Michael Ellis	2022–2022
Paymaster General		Michael Ellis	2021–2022

==== Changes ====
- Lord Frost resigned from the government on 18 December 2021. His role as Brexit minister was taken over by Foreign Secretary Liz Truss.
- Oliver Dowden resigned as Co-Chairman of the Conservative Party and Minister without Portfolio on 24 June 2022 following the Conservative defeats at the Tiverton and Honiton by-election and Wakefield by-election.

=== 5 July 2022 – 6 September 2022 ===
Fifth Johnson Cabinet
Portfolio	Portrait	Minister	Term
Cabinet ministers
Prime Minister; First Lord of the Treasury; Minister for the Union; Minister for the Civil Service		Boris Johnson	2019–2022
Deputy Prime Minister; Secretary of State for Justice; Lord High Chancellor of Great Britain		Dominic Raab	2021–2022
Chancellor of the Exchequer; Second Lord of the Treasury		Nadhim Zahawi	2022
Secretary of State for Foreign, Commonwealth and Development Affairs		Liz Truss	2021–2022
Minister for Women and Equalities		Liz Truss	2019–2022
Secretary of State for the Home Department		Priti Patel	2019–2022
Secretary of State for Defence		Ben Wallace	2019–2023
Secretary of State for Health and Social Care		Steve Barclay	2022
Chancellor of the Duchy of Lancaster		Kit Malthouse	2022
Secretary of State for Levelling Up, Housing and Communities		Greg Clark	2022
Secretary of State for Business, Energy and Industrial Strategy		Kwasi Kwarteng	2021–2022
President for COP26		Alok Sharma	2021–2022
Secretary of State for International Trade; President of the Board of Trade		Anne-Marie Trevelyan	2021–2022
Secretary of State for Work and Pensions		Thérèse Coffey	2019–2022
Secretary of State for Education		Michelle Donelan	2022
Secretary of State for Education		James Cleverly	2022
Secretary of State for Environment, Food and Rural Affairs		George Eustice	2022
Secretary of State for Transport		Grant Shapps	2019–2022
Secretary of State for Northern Ireland		Shailesh Vara	2022
Secretary of State for Scotland		Alister Jack	2019–2024
Secretary of State for Wales		Sir Robert Buckland	2022
Leader of the House of Lords; Lord Keeper of the Privy Seal		Natalie Evans, Baroness Evans of Bowes Park	2016–2022
Secretary of State for Digital, Culture, Media and Sport		Nadine Dorries	2021–2022
Minister without Portfolio (unpaid); Party Chairman		Andrew Stephenson	2022–2022
Minister of State for Brexit Opportunities and Government Efficiency		Jacob Rees-Mogg	2022–2022
Also attending cabinet meetings
Minister for the Cabinet Office		Michael Ellis	2022
Paymaster General		Michael Ellis	2021–2022
Chief Whip of the House of Commons; Parliamentary Secretary to the Treasury		Chris Heaton-Harris	2022
Chief Secretary to the Treasury		Simon Clarke	2021–2022
Leader of the House of Commons; Lord President of the Council		Mark Spencer	2022
Attorney General for England and Wales; Advocate General for Northern Ireland		Suella Braverman	2020–2021; 2021–2022
Minister of State without Portfolio		Nigel Adams	2021–2022
Minister of State for Veterans' Affairs		Johnny Mercer	2022

==== Changes ====
- Sajid Javid resigned as Secretary of State for Health and Social Care on 5 July. He was replaced by Steve Barclay, the former Chancellor of the Duchy of Lancaster, who is in turn replaced by Kit Malthouse, former Home Office minister as Chancellor of the Duchy of Lancaster.
- Rishi Sunak also resigned as Chancellor of the Exchequer on 5 July. He was replaced by Nadhim Zahawi, who was replaced as Secretary of State for Education by Michelle Donelan.
- Michael Gove was dismissed from Secretary of State for Levelling Up, Housing and Communities on 6 July. He was replaced by Greg Clark.
- Simon Hart resigned as Secretary of State for Wales on 6 July. He was replaced by Robert Buckland, a former Secretary of State for Justice.
- Brandon Lewis resigned as Secretary of State for Northern Ireland on 7 July. He was replaced by Shailesh Vara.
- Michelle Donelan resigned as Secretary of State for Education on 7 July. She was replaced by James Cleverly, Minister of State for Europe and North America.
- The roles of Minister of State for Higher and Further Education and Minister for Crime and Policing were not designated as attending Cabinet.
- Andrew Stephenson joined the Cabinet as Minister without portfolio and co-chairman of the Conservative Party.

== List of ministers ==
Minister in the House of Commons	Minister in the House of Lords
Cabinet ministers and ministers that attend cabinet are listed **in bold**

=== Prime Minister and Cabinet Office ===
Cabinet Office
Post	Minister	Term
Prime Minister of the United Kingdom; First Lord of the Treasury; Minister for the Civil Service; Minister for the Union	**Boris Johnson**	July 2019 – September 2022
Chancellor of the Duchy of Lancaster	Michael Gove	July 2019 – September 2021
Chancellor of the Duchy of Lancaster	Steve Barclay	September 2021 – July 2022
Chancellor of the Duchy of Lancaster	**Kit Malthouse**	July 2022 – September 2022
Minister for the Cabinet Office	Oliver Dowden	July 2019 – February 2020
Minister for the Cabinet Office	Michael Gove	February 2020 – September 2021
Minister for the Cabinet Office	Steve Barclay	September 2021 – February 2022
Minister for the Cabinet Office	**Michael Ellis**	February 2022 – September 2022
Leader of the House of Lords; Lord Keeper of the Privy Seal	**Natalie Evans, Baroness Evans of Bowes Park**	July 2016 – September 2022
Minister without Portfolio; Chairman of the Conservative Party	James Cleverly (unpaid)	July 2019 – February 2020
Minister without Portfolio; Chairman of the Conservative Party	Amanda Milling (unpaid)	February 2020 – September 2021
Minister without Portfolio; Chairman of the Conservative Party	Oliver Dowden (unpaid)	September 2021 – June 2022
Minister without Portfolio; Chairman of the Conservative Party	Andrew Stephenson (unpaid)	July 2022 – September 2022
Leader of the House of Commons; Lord President of the Council	Jacob Rees-Mogg	July 2019 – February 2022
Leader of the House of Commons; Lord President of the Council	**Mark Spencer**	February 2022 – September 2022
Paymaster General	Oliver Dowden	July 2019 – February 2020
Paymaster General	Penny Mordaunt	February 2020 – September 2021
Paymaster General	Michael Ellis	September 2021 – September 2022
Minister of State (Minister for the Northern Powerhouse and Local Growth)	Jake Berry (jointly with Housing, Communities and Local Government)	July 2019 – February 2020
Parliamentary Secretary (Minister for the Constitution)	Chloe Smith	January 2018 – February 2020
Minister of State (Minister for the Constitution and Devolution)	Chloe Smith	February 2020 – September 2021
Minister of State without Portfolio	**Nigel Adams**	September 2021 – September 2022
Minister of State for Efficiency and Transformation	Theodore Agnew, Baron Agnew of Oulton (unpaid, jointly with the Treasury)	February 2020 – January 2022
Minister of State	Nicholas True, Baron True	February 2020 – September 2022
Parliamentary Secretary (Minister for Defence People and Veterans)	Johnny Mercer (jointly with Defence)	July 2019 – April 2021
Parliamentary Secretary (Minister for Defence People and Veterans)	Leo Docherty (jointly with Defence)	April 2021 – July 2022
Minister of State for Veterans' Affairs	Johnny Mercer	July 2022 – September 2022
Parliamentary Secretary to the Cabinet Office (Minister for Implementation)	Jeremy Quin	December 2019 – February 2020
Parliamentary Secretary to the Cabinet Office (Minister for Implementation)	Julia Lopez	February 2020 – September 2021
Parliamentary Secretary to the Cabinet Office (Minister for Implementation)	Heather Wheeler (unpaid; also a Whip)	February 2022 – September 2022
President for COP26 (Note: Formally a Minister of State at the Cabinet Office.)	**Alok Sharma**	January 2021 – September 2022
Minister of State at the Cabinet Office (Minister for EU Relations)	David Frost, Baron Frost	March 2021 – December 2021
Parliamentary Secretary (Minister for Policy and Head of the Prime Minister's Policy Unit	Andrew Griffith (unpaid)	February 2022 – July 2022
Minister of State (Minister for Brexit Opportunities and Government Efficiency)	**Jacob Rees-Mogg**	February 2022 – September 2022
Parliamentary Secretary to the Cabinet Office (Deputy Leader of the House of Commons)	Peter Bone	July 2022 – September 2022

=== Departments of state ===
Business, Energy and Industrial Strategy
Secretary of State for Business, Energy and Industrial Strategy	Andrea Leadsom	July 2019 – February 2020
Secretary of State for Business, Energy and Industrial Strategy	Alok Sharma	February 2020 – January 2021
Secretary of State for Business, Energy and Industrial Strategy	**Kwasi Kwarteng**	January 2021 – September 2022
Minister of State for Business, Energy and Clean Growth and Climate Change	Kwasi Kwarteng	July 2019 – January 2021
Minister of State for Business, Energy and Clean Growth and Climate Change	Anne-Marie Trevelyan	January 2021 – September 2021
Minister of State for Business, Energy and Clean Growth and Climate Change	Greg Hands	September 2021 – September 2022
Minister of State for Universities, Science, Research and Innovation	Chris Skidmore (jointly with Education)	September 2019 – February 2020
Minister of State for Investment	Gerry Grimstone, Baron Grimstone of Boscobel (unpaid, jointly with International Trade)	March 2020 – July 2022
Parliamentary Under-Secretary of State for Small Business, Consumers and Corporate Responsibility	Kelly Tolhurst	July 2018 – February 2020
Parliamentary Under-Secretary of State for Small Business, Consumers and Labour Markets	Paul Scully (also Minister for London)	February 2020 – July 2022
Parliamentary Under-Secretary of State for Small Business, Consumers and Labour Markets	Jane Hunt	July 2022 – September 2022
Parliamentary Under-Secretary of State (Minister for Business & Industry)	Nadhim Zahawi (unpaid)	July 2019 – September 2021
Parliamentary Under-Secretary of State (Minister for Business & Industry)	Lee Rowley (unpaid, also a Whip)	September 2021 – July 2022
Parliamentary Under Secretary of State for Science, Research and Innovation	Amanda Solloway	February 2020 – September 2021
Parliamentary Under Secretary of State for Science, Research and Innovation	George Freeman	September 2021 – July 2022
Parliamentary Under-Secretary of State (Minister for Climate Change)	Ian Duncan, Baron Duncan of Springbank (jointly with Northern Ireland Office)	July 2019 – February 2020
Parliamentary Under-Secretary of State (Minister for Business, Energy and Corporate Responsibility)	Martin Callanan, Baron Callanan	February 2020 – February 2023

Defence
Secretary of State for Defence	**Ben Wallace**	July 2019 – August 2023
Minister of State for Defence Procurement	James Heappey	December 2019 – February 2020
Minister of State for Defence Procurement	Jeremy Quin	February 2020 – September 2022
Minister of State for Defence	Annabel Goldie, Baroness Goldie (unpaid)	July 2019 – 2024
Parliamentary Under-Secretary of State for the Armed Forces	Anne-Marie Trevelyan	December 2019 - February 2020
Parliamentary Under-Secretary of State for the Armed Forces	James Heappey	February 2020 - July 2022
Minister of State for the Armed Forces	James Heappey	July 2022 – September 2022
Minister for Defence People	Leo Docherty	July 2022 – September 2022
Parliamentary Under-Secretary of State for the Armed Forces	Anne-Marie Trevelyan	December 2019 – February 2020
Parliamentary Under-Secretary of State for the Armed Forces	James Heappey	February 2020 – July 2022
Parliamentary Under-Secretary of State for Defence People and Veterans	Johnny Mercer (jointly with Cabinet Office)	July 2019 – April 2021
Parliamentary Under-Secretary of State for Defence People and Veterans	Leo Docherty (jointly with Cabinet Office)	April 2021 – July 2022

Digital, Culture, Media and Sport
Secretary of State for Digital, Culture, Media and Sport	Nicky Morgan, Baroness Morgan of Cotes	July 2019 – February 2020
Secretary of State for Digital, Culture, Media and Sport	Oliver Dowden	February 2020 – September 2021
Secretary of State for Digital, Culture, Media and Sport	**Nadine Dorries**	September 2021 – September 2022
Minister of State for Sport, Media and Creative Industries	Nigel Adams	July 2019 – February 2020
Minister of State for Digital and Culture	Caroline Dinenage	February 2020 – September 2021
Minister of State for Media, Data and Digital Infrastructure	John Whittingdale	February 2020 – September 2021
Minister of State for Media, Data and Digital Infrastructure	Julia Lopez	September 2021 – July 2022
Minister of State	Matt Warman	July 2022 – September 2022
Parliamentary Under-Secretary of State for Arts, Heritage and Tourism	Helen Whately	September 2019 – February 2020
Parliamentary Under Secretary of State for Sport, Tourism, Heritage and Civil Society	Nigel Huddleston	February 2020 – September 2022
Parliamentary Under-Secretary of State for Digital and Broadband (to Feb 2020) Parliamentary Under-Secretary of State for Digital Infrastructure (from Feb 2020)	Matt Warman	July 2019 – September 2021
Parliamentary Under-Sereatary of State for Tech and Digital Economy	Chris Philp	September 2021 – July 2022
Parliamentary Under-Secretary of State	Damian Collins	July 2022 – October 2022
Parliamentary Under-Secretary of State (Minister for Civil Society & DCMS)	Diana Barran, Baroness Barran (unpaid)	July 2019 – September 2021
Parliamentary Under Secretary of State (Minister for Arts)	Stephen Parkinson, Baron Parkinson of Whitley Bay (unpaid)	September 2021 – September 2022

Education
Secretary of State for Education	Gavin Williamson	July 2019 – September 2021
Secretary of State for Education	Nadhim Zahawi	September 2021 – July 2022
Secretary of State for Education	Michelle Donelan	July 2022
Secretary of State for Education	**James Cleverly**	July 2022 – September 2022
Minister of State for School Standards	Nick Gibb	May 2015 – September 2021
Minister of State for School Standards	Robin Walker	September 2021 – July 2022
Minister of State for School Standards	Will Quince	July 2022 – September 2022
Minister of State for Universities, Science, Research & Innovation to February 2020,	Chris Skidmore (jointly with BEIS)	September 2019 – February 2020
Minister of State for Universities (Feb 202 - Sept 2021); Minister of State for Higher and Further Education (Sept 2021 - July 2022)	Michelle Donelan	February 2020 – July 2022; Attending Cabinet since September 2021
Parliamentary Under-Secretary of State for Children and Families	Kemi Badenoch (unpaid)	July 2019 – February 2020
Parliamentary Under-Secretary of State for Children and Families	Michelle Donelan (unpaid) (maternity cover)	September 2019 – February 2020
Parliamentary Under-Secretary of State for Children and Families	Vicky Ford	February 2020 – September 2021
Parliamentary Under-Secretary of State for Children and Families	Will Quince	September 2021 – July 2022
Parliamentary Under-Secretary of State for Children and Families	Brendan Clarke-Smith	July 2022 – September 2022
Parliamentary Under-Secretary of State for Apprenticeships and Skills	Gillian Keegan	February 2020 – September 2021
Parliamentary Under-Secretary of State for Apprenticeships and Skills	Alex Burghart	September 2021 – July 2022
Parliamentary Under-Secretary of State for Skills, Further and Higher Education	Andrea Jenkyns	July 2022 – October 2022
Parliamentary Under-Secretary of State (Minister for the School System)	Theodore Agnew, Baron Agnew of Oulton (unpaid)	July 2019 – February 2020
Parliamentary Under-Secretary of State (Minister for the School System)	Elizabeth Berridge, Baroness Berridge (Formally Unpaid)	February 2020 – September 2021
Parliamentary Under-Secretary of State (Minister for the School System)	Diana Barran, Baroness Barran (unpaid)	September 2021 – September 2022

Environment, Food and Rural Affairs
Secretary of State for Environment, Food and Rural Affairs	Theresa Villiers	July 2019 – February 2020
Secretary of State for Environment, Food and Rural Affairs	**George Eustice**	February 2020 – September 2022
Parliamentary Under-Secretary of State for Environment, Food and Rural Affairs and International Development (Sept 2019 - Feb 2020); Minister of State for the Pacific and the International Environment (Feb 2020 - Sept 2022)	Zac Goldsmith, Baron Goldsmith of Richmond Park (unpaid, jointly with International Development until September 2020 and Foreign Office)	September 2019 – September 2022
Minister of State for Agriculture, Fisheries and Food	George Eustice	July 2019 – February 2020
Minister of State for Farming, Fisheries and Food	Victoria Prentis	September 2021 – September 2022
Minister for Nature Recovery and the Domestic Environment	Rebecca Pow	September 2019 – July 2022
Minister for Nature Recovery and the Domestic Environment	Steve Double	July 2022 – September 2022
Parliamentary Under-Secretary of State for Rural Affairs, Access to Nature and Biosecurity	John Gardiner, Baron Gardiner of Kimble	July 2019 – May 2021
Parliamentary Under-Secretary of State for Rural Affairs, Access to Nature and Biosecurity	Richard Benyon, Baron Benyon	May 2021 – September 2022
Parliamentary Under-Secretary of State for Agriculture, Fisheries and Food	Victoria Prentis	February 2020 – September 2021
Parliamentary Under-Secretary of State for Agri-innovation and Climate Adaption	Jo Churchill	September 2021 – July 2022

Equalities Office
Minister for Women and Equalities	**Liz Truss** (also Trade Secretary to Sept 2021 and Foreign Secretary from Sept 2021)	September 2019 – September 2022
Minister of State (Minister for Equalities)	Susan Williams, Baroness Williams of Trafford (jointly with International Trade)	January 2018 – February 2020
Minister of State (Minister for Equalities)	Kemi Badenoch (jointly with Treasury till Sept 2021and Foreign Office and Housing, Communities and Local Government from September 2021	February 2020 – July 2022
Parliamentary Under-Secretary of State (Minister for Women)	Victoria Atkins (jointly with International Trade)	January 2018 – February 2020
Parliamentary Under-Secretary of State (Minister for Women)	Elizabeth Berridge, Baroness Berridge (unpaid, jointly with Education)	February 2020 – September 2021
Parliamentary Under-Secretary of State (Minister for Women)	Deborah Stedman-Scott, Baroness Stedman-Scott	September 2021 – September 2022
Parliamentary Under-Secretary of State (Minister for Equalities)	Mike Freer (jointly with Foreign Office and International Trade)	September 2021 – July 2022
Parliamentary Under-Secretary of State (Minister for Equalities)	Amanda Solloway (jointly with Foreign Office)	July 2022 – September 2022

Exiting the European Union (dissolved 31 January 2020)
Secretary of State for Exiting the European Union	Steve Barclay	November 2018 – January 2020
Minister of State	Martin Callanan, Baron Callanan	October 2017 – January 2020
Parliamentary Under-Secretary of State	James Duddridge	July 2019 – January 2020

Foreign, Commonwealth and Development Office (from September 2020), Foreign and Commonwealth Office (until September 2020)
First Secretary of State	Dominic Raab	July 2019 – September 2021
Secretary of State for Foreign and Commonwealth Affairs	Dominic Raab	July 2019 – September 2020
Secretary of State for Foreign, Commonwealth and Development Affairs	Dominic Raab	September 2020 - September 2021
Secretary of State for Foreign, Commonwealth and Development Affairs	**Liz Truss** (also Minister for Women and Equalities)	September 2021 – September 2022
Minister of State for the Middle East, North Africa (Feb 2019 - Dec 2021) Minister of State for the Middle East, North Africa and North America (Dec 2021 - Feb 2022)	Andrew Murrison (jointly with International Development)	May 2019 – February 2020
Minister of State for the Middle East, North Africa (Feb 2019 - Dec 2021) Minister of State for the Middle East, North Africa and North America (Dec 2021 - Feb 2022)	James Cleverly (jointly with International Development until September 2020)	February 2020 – February 2022
Minister of State for the Pacific and the International Environment	Zac Goldsmith, Goldsmith of Richmond Park (unpaid, jointly with International Development until September 2020 and EFRA)	February 2020 – September 2022
Minister of State for European Neighbourhood and the Americas	Christopher Pincher	July 2019 – February 2020
Parliamentary Under-Secretary of State for European Neighbourhood and the Americas	Wendy Morton (jointly with International Development until September 2020)	February 2020 – December 2021
Minister of State for Europe	Chris Heaton-Harris	December 2021 – February 2022
Minister of State for Europe and North America	James Cleverly	February 2022 – July 2022
Minister of State for Europe	Graham Stuart	July 2022 – September 2022
Minister of State for Africa	Andrew Stephenson (jointly with International Development)	July 2019 – February 2020
Parliamentary Under-Secretary of State for Africa	James Duddridge (jointly with International Development until September 2020)	February 2020 – September 2021
Parliamentary Under-Secretary of State for Africa	Vicky Ford	September 2021 – December 2021
Parliamentary Under-Secretary of State for Africa, Latin America and the Caribbean	Vicky Ford	December 2021 – September 2022
Minister of State for the Commonwealth, the UN from 2017 and South and Central Asia from 2020 and North Africa from 2022	Tariq Ahmad, Baron Ahmad of Wimbledon (jointly with International Development until September 2020)	June 2017 – July 2024
Parliamentary Under-Secretary of State for Asia and the Pacific	Heather Wheeler	July 2019 – February 2020
Minister of State for Asia to February 2022, Minister of State for Asia and the Middle East from February 2022	Nigel Adams (jointly with International Development until September 2020)	February 2020 – September 2021
Minister of State for Asia to February 2022, Minister of State for Asia and the Middle East from February 2022	Amanda Milling	September 2021 – September 2022
Parliamentary Under Secretary of State for North America, Sanctions and Consular policy	Rehman Chishti	July 2022 – September 2022
Parliamentary Under Secretary of State for Overseas Territories & Sustainable Development, (Prime Minister's Special Envoy for Girls' Education from 5 March 2020)	Liz Sugg, Baroness Sugg (jointly with International Development until September 2020)	February 2020 – November 2020
Minister of State for Equalities	Kemi Badenoch (jointly with Equalities Office and Housing Communities and Local Government)	September 2021 – July 2022
Parliamentary Under Secretary of State (Minister for Women)	Deborah Stedman-Scott, Baroness Stedman-Scott (jointly with Equalities and Work and Pensions)	September 2021 – September 2022
Parliamentary Under Secretary of State (Minister for Equalities)	Mike Freer (jointly with Equalities and International Trade)	September 2021 – July 2022
Parliamentary Under Secretary of State (Minister for Equalities)	Amanda Solloway (jointly with Equalities)	July 2022 – September 2022

Health and Social Care
Secretary of State for Health and Social Care	Matt Hancock	July 2018 – June 2021
Secretary of State for Health and Social Care	Sajid Javid	June 2021 – July 2022
Secretary of State for Health and Social Care	**Steve Barclay**	July 2022 – September 2022
Minister of State for Health	Edward Argar	September 2019 – July 2022
Minister of State for Health	Maria Caulfield	July 2022 – September 2022
Minister of State for Care	Caroline Dinenage	January 2018 – February 2020
Minister of State for Care	Helen Whately	February 2020 – September 2021
Minister of State for Care and Mental Health	Gillian Keegan	September 2021 – September 2022
Minister of State for Patient Safety, Suicide Prevention and Mental Health	Nadine Dorries	May 2020 – September 2021
Parliamentary Under-Secretary of State for Prevention, Public Health & Primary Care	Jo Churchill	July 2019 – September 2021
Parliamentary Under-Secretary of State for Patient Safety and Primary Care	Maria Caulfield	September 2021 – July 2022
Parliamentary Under-Secretary of State for Patient Safety and Primary Care	James Morris	July 2022 – September 2022
Parliamentary Under-Secretary of State for Mental Health, Suicide Prevention & Patient Safety	Nadine Dorries	July 2019 – May 2020
Parliamentary Under-Secretary of State for COVID Vaccine Deployment	Nadhim Zahawi (paid as a Parliamentary Secretary)	November 2020 – September 2021
Parliamentary Under-Secretary of State for Vaccines and Public Health	Maggie Throup (paid as a Parliamentary Secretary)	September 2021 – September 2022
Parliamentary Under-Secretary of State for Life Sciences	Nicola Blackwood, Baroness Blackwood of North Oxford	January 2019 – February 2020
Parliamentary Under-Secretary of State for Innovation	James Bethell, 5th Baron Bethell (unpaid)	March 2020 – September 2021
Parliamentary Under-Secretary of State for Technology, Innovation and Life Sciences	Syed Kamall, Baron Kamall	September 2021 – September 2022

Home Office
Secretary of State for the Home Department	**Priti Patel**	July 2019 – September 2022
Deputy Home Secretary and Minister of State for Security	Brandon Lewis	July 2019 – February 2020
Minister for Security to September 2021, Minister for Security and Borders from September 2021	James Brokenshire	February 2020 – July 2021 (on leave from 11 January 2021)
Minister for Security to September 2021, Minister for Security and Borders from September 2021	Damian Hinds	August 2021 – July 2022
Minister for Security to September 2021, Minister for Security and Borders from September 2021	Stephen McPartland (unpaid)	July 2022 – September 2022
Minister of State for Crime, Policing & the Fire Service to Feb 2020, Minister for Crime and Policing from Feb 2020	Kit Malthouse (jointly with Justice from February 2020)	July 2019 – July 2022; Attending Cabinet since September 2021
Minister of State for Crime, Policing & the Fire Service to Feb 2020, Minister for Crime and Policing from Feb 2020	Tom Pursglove (jointly with Justice)	July 2022 – September 2022
Minister of State for Countering Extremism to February 2020, Lords Minister from February 2020	Susan Williams, Baroness Williams of Trafford (jointly with Equalities Office until February 2020)	July 2016 – September 2022
Minister of State for Building Safety and Fire	Stephen Greenhalgh, Baron Greenhalgh (unpaid, jointly with Communities)	March 2020 – July 2022
Parliamentary Under-Secretary of State for Crime, Safeguarding and Vulnerability	Victoria Atkins (jointly with Equalities Office until February 2020)	November 2017 – September 2021
Parliamentary Under-Secretary of State for Crime, Safeguarding and Vulnerability	Rachel Maclean	September 2021 – July 2022
Parliamentary Under-Secretary of State for Crime, Safeguarding and Vulnerability	Amanda Solloway (jointly with Justice)	July 2022 – September 2022
Parliamentary Under-Secretary of State for Immigration to Feb 2020, Future Borders and Immigration from Feb 2020 to 2021, Safe and Legal Immigration from 2021	Kevin Foster	December 2019 – September 2022
Parliamentary Under-Secretary of State for Immigration Compliance and the Courts	Chris Philp (jointly with Justice)	February 2020 – September 2021
Parliamentary Under-Secretary of State for Immigration Compliance and the Courts	Tom Pursglove	September 2021 – July 2022
Parliamentary Under-Secretary of State, (Minister for illegal Migration)	Simon Baynes (jointly with Justice)	July 2022 – September 2022
Parliamentary Under-Secretary of State	Sarah Dines	July 2022 – September 2022
Minister for Afghan Resettlement, Minister of State	Victoria Atkins (jointly with Housing and Justice)	September 2021 – March 2022
Minister of State, Minister for Refugees	Richard Harrington (unpaid, jointly with Levelling Up Housing and Communities	March 2022 – September 2022

Levelling Up, Housing and Communities
Secretary of State for Housing, Communities and Local Government	Robert Jenrick	July 2019 – September 2021
Secretary of State for Housing, Communities and Local Government	Michael Gove	September 2021
Secretary of State for Levelling Up, Housing and Communities, Minister for Intergovernmental Relations	Michael Gove	September 2021 – July 2022
Secretary of State for Levelling Up, Housing and Communities	**Greg Clark**	July 2022 – September 2022
Minister of State for Housing	Esther McVey	July 2019 – February 2020
Minister of State for Housing	Christopher Pincher	February 2020 – February 2022
Minister of State for Housing	Stuart Andrew	February 2022 – July 2022
Minister of State for Housing	Marcus Jones	July 2022 – September 2022
Minister of State for the Northern Powerhouse and Local Growth	Jake Berry (jointly with Cabinet Office)	July 2019 – February 2020
Minister of State for Regional Growth and Local Government	Simon Clarke	February 2020 – September 2020
Minister of State for Regional Growth and Local Government	Luke Hall	September 2020 – September 2021
Minister of State (Minister for Local Government, Faith and Communities)	Kemi Badenoch (jointly with Equalities Office and Foreign Office)	September 2021 – July 2022
Minister of State for Local Government and Building Safety	Paul Scully (also Minister for London)	July 2022 – October 2022
Parliamentary Under-Secretary of State for Rough Sleeping and Housing	Luke Hall	July 2019 – September 2020
Parliamentary Under-Secretary of State for Rough Sleeping and Housing	Kelly Tolhurst	September 2020 – January 2021
Parliamentary Under-Secretary of State for Rough Sleeping and Housing	Eddie Hughes	January 2021 – September 2022
Minister for London	Chris Philp	December 2019 – February 2020
Parliamentary Under Secretary of State for Levelling Up, The Union and Constitution	Neil O'Brien	September 2021 – July 2022
Parliamentary Under Secretary of State for Levelling Up, The Union and Constitution	Lia Nici	July 2022 – September 2022
Parliamentary Under-Secretary of State for Faith and Communities	James Younger, 5th Viscount Younger of Leckie	July 2019 – February 2020
Minister of State for Building Safety and Fire	Stephen Greenhalgh, Baron Greenhalgh (unpaid, jointly with Home Office)	March 2020 – July 2022
Minister for Afghan Resettlement, Minister of State	Victoria Atkins (jointly with Home office and Justice)	September 2021 – March 2022
Minister of State for Refugees	Richard Harrington (unpaid, jointly with Home Office)	March 2022 – September 2022

International Development (dissolved 2 September 2020)
Secretary of State for International Development	Alok Sharma	July 2019 – February 2020
Secretary of State for International Development	Anne-Marie Trevelyan	February 2020 – September 2020
Minister of State for International Development, Middle East and North Africa	Andrew Murrison (jointly with the FCO)	May 2019 – February 2020
Minister of State for International Development, Middle East and North Africa	James Cleverly (jointly with the FCO)	February 2020 – September 2020
Minister of State for Africa	Andrew Stephenson (jointly with the FCO)	July 2019 – February 2020
Minister of State for Africa	James Duddridge (jointly with the FCO)	February 2020 – September 2020
Minister of State for Asia	Nigel Adams (jointly with the FCO)	February 2020 – September 2020
Minister of State for Pacific and the Environment	Zac Goldsmith, Baron Goldsmith of Richmond Park (unpaid, jointly with DEFRA and FCO)	September 2019 – September 2020
Minister of State for South Asia and the Commonwealth	Tariq Ahmad, Baron Ahmad of Wimbledon (jointly with the FCO)	February 2020 – September 2020
Parliamentary Under-Secretary of State for International Development, Minister for Europe and the Americas	Wendy Morton (jointly with the FCO)	February 2020 – September 2020
Parliamentary Under-Secretary of State for International Development, Minister for Overseas Territories & Sustainable Development, (Prime Minister's Special Envoy for Girls' Education from 5 March 2020)	Liz Sugg, Baroness Sugg (jointly with the FCO) from February 2020	July 2019 – September 2020

International Trade
Secretary of State for International Trade; President of the Board of Trade	Liz Truss (also Minister for Women and Equalities from Sept 2019)	July 2019 – September 2021
Secretary of State for International Trade; President of the Board of Trade	**Anne-Marie Trevelyan**	September 2021 – September 2022
Minister of State for Trade Policy	Conor Burns	July 2019 – May 2020
Minister of State for Trade Policy	Greg Hands	February 2020 – September 2021
Minister of State for Trade Policy	Penny Mordaunt	September 2021 – September 2022
Minister of State for Investment	Gerry Grimstone, Baron Grimstone of Boscobel (unpaid, jointly with Business)	March 2020 – July 2022
Parliamentary Under-Secretary of State (Minister for Investment to Feb 2020, Exports from February 2020)	Graham Stuart	July 2019 – September 2021
Parliamentary Under-Secretary of State (Minister for Investment to Feb 2020, Exports from February 2020)	Mike Freer (also (Parliamentary Under-Secretary of State, Minister for Equalities) jointly with Foreign Office and Equalities)	September 2021 – July 2022
Parliamentary Under-Secretary of State (Minister for Investment to Feb 2020, Exports from February 2020)	Andrew Griffith	July 2022 – September 2022
Parliamentary Under-Secretary of State (Minister for International Trade)	Ranil Jayawardena	May 2020 – September 2022
Parliamentary Under Secretary of State (Minister for Women)	Victoria Atkins ((also with Equalities)	September 2019 – February 2020
Parliamentary Under Secretary of State (Minister for Women)	Elizabeth Berridge, Baroness Berridge (unpaid, jointly with Education and Equalities)	February 2020 – September 2021
Minister for Equalities	Susan Williams, Baroness Williams of Trafford (also with Equalities and Home Office)	September 2019 – February 2020
Minister for Equalities	Kemi Badenoch (jointly with Treasury and Equalities)	February 2020 – September 2021

Justice
Secretary of State for Justice; Lord High Chancellor of Great Britain	Robert Buckland	July 2019 – September 2021
Secretary of State for Justice; Lord High Chancellor of Great Britain	**Dominic Raab**	September 2021 – September 2022
Deputy Prime Minister	**Dominic Raab**	September 2021 – September 2022
Advocate General for Scotland; Spokesperson for the Lords	Richard Keen, Baron Keen of Elie	May 2015 – September 2020
Advocate General for Scotland; Spokesperson for the Lords	Keith Stewart, Baron Stewart of Dirleton	October 2020 – July 2024
Minister of State for Prisons and Probation	Lucy Frazer	July 2019 – March 2021, September 2021
Minister of State for Prisons and Probation	Alex Chalk	March 2021 – September 2021
Minister of State for Prisons and Probation	Victoria Atkins	September 2021 – July 2022
Minister of State for Prisons and Probation	Stuart Andrew	July 2022 – September 2022
Minister of State for Crime and Policing	Kit Malthouse (jointly with Home Office)	February 2020 – July 2022; Attending Cabinet since September 2021
Minister of State for Crime and Policing	Tom Pursglove (jointly with Home Office)	July 2022 – September 2022
Parliamentary Under-Secretary of State	Wendy Morton	July 2019 – February 2020
Parliamentary Under-Secretary of State	Alex Chalk (unpaid)	February 2020 – September 2021
Parliamentary Under-Secretary of State	James Cartlidge (unpaid, also an Assistant Whip)	September 2021 – July 2022
Parliamentary Under-Secretary of State	Sarah Dines (jointly with Home Office)	July 2022 – September 2022
Parliamentary Under-Secretary of State (Minister for Immigration Compliance and the Courts)	Chris Philp (jointly with Home Office from February 2020)	September 2019 – September 2021
Parliamentary Under-Secretary of State (Minister for Immigration Compliance and the Courts)	Tom Pursglove	September 2021 – July 2022
Parliamentary Under-Secretary of State, (Minister for illegal Migration)	Simon Baynes (jointly with Home Office)	July 2022 – September 2022
Parliamentary Under-Secretary of State	David Wolfson, Baron Wolfson of Tredegar (unpaid)	December 2020 – April 2022
Parliamentary Under-Secretary of State	Christopher Bellamy, Baron Bellamy (unpaid)	June 2022 – July 2024
Minister of State for the Afghan Resettlement	Victoria Atkins (jointly with Home Office and Housing)	September 2021 – March 2022

Northern Ireland Office
Secretary of State for Northern Ireland	Julian Smith	July 2019 – February 2020
Secretary of State for Northern Ireland	Brandon Lewis	February 2020 – July 2022
Secretary of State for Northern Ireland	**Shailesh Vara**	July 2022 – September 2022
Parliamentary Under-Secretary of State to February 2020, Minister of State from February 2020	Robin Walker	July 2019 – September 2021
Parliamentary Under-Secretary of State to February 2020, Minister of State from February 2020	The Hon Conor Burns	September 2021 – September 2022
Parliamentary Under-Secretary of State for Northern Ireland	Ian Duncan, Baron Duncan of Springbank (jointly with BEIS)	October 2017 – February 2020
Parliamentary Under-Secretary of State for Northern Ireland	Jonathan Caine, Baron Caine (unpaid)	November 2021 – July 2024

Scotland Office
Secretary of State for Scotland	**Alister Jack**	July 2019 – July 2024
Parliamentary Under-Secretary of State for Scotland (Minister for Scotland)	Douglas Ross (unpaid, jointly with Whips office)	December 2019 – May 2020
Parliamentary Under-Secretary of State for Scotland (Minister for Scotland)	Iain Stewart	June 2020 – September 2022
Parliamentary Under-Secretary of State for Scotland	David Duguid (unpaid, jointly with Whips office)	June 2020 – September 2021
Parliamentary Under-Secretary of State for Scotland	Malcolm Offord, Baron Offord of Garvel (unpaid)	September 2021 – July 2024

Transport
Secretary of State for Transport	**Grant Shapps**	July 2019 – September 2022
Minister of State for Railways	Chris Heaton-Harris	July 2019 – December 2021
Minister of State for High Speed 2	George Freeman	July 2019 – February 2020
Minister of State for High Speed 2	Andrew Stephenson	February 2020 – July 2022
Minister of State for High Speed 2	Trudy Harrison	July 2022 – September 2022
Minister of State for Transport	Wendy Morton	February 2022 – September 2022
Parliamentary Under-Secretary of State for Transport	Wendy Morton	December 2021 – February 2022
Parliamentary Under-Secretary of State for Roads and Light Rail	Charlotte Vere, Baroness Vere of Norbiton	July 2019 – November 2023
Parliamentary Under-Secretary of State for Aviation and Maritime	Nus Ghani	January 2018 – February 2020
Parliamentary Under-Secretary of State for Aviation and Maritime	Kelly Tolhurst	February 2020 – September 2020
Parliamentary Under-Secretary of State for Aviation and Maritime	Robert Courts	September 2020 – September 2022
Parliamentary Under-Secretary of State for Future of Transport	Paul Maynard	July 2019 – February 2020
Parliamentary Under-Secretary of State for Future of Transport	Rachel Maclean	February 2020 – September 2021
Parliamentary Under-Secretary of State for Future of Transport	Trudy Harrison	September 2021 – July 2022
Parliamentary Under-Secretary of State for Future of Transport	Karl McCartney	July 2022 – September 2022

Treasury
Chancellor of the Exchequer; Second Lord of the Treasury	Sajid Javid	July 2019 – February 2020
Chancellor of the Exchequer; Second Lord of the Treasury	Rishi Sunak	February 2020 – July 2022
Chancellor of the Exchequer; Second Lord of the Treasury	**Nadhim Zahawi**	July 2022 – September 2022
Chief Secretary to the Treasury	Rishi Sunak	July 2019 – February 2020
Chief Secretary to the Treasury	Steve Barclay	February 2020 – September 2021
Chief Secretary to the Treasury	**Simon Clarke**	September 2021 – September 2022
Financial Secretary to the Treasury	Jesse Norman	May 2019 – September 2021
Financial Secretary to the Treasury	Lucy Frazer	September 2021 – September 2022
Minister of State for Efficiency and Transformation (jointly with Cabinet Office)	Theodore Agnew, Baron Agnew of Oulton (unpaid)	February 2020 – January 2022
Minister of State, Economic Secretary to the Treasury	John Glen (paid as a Parliamentary Secretary to September 2021, unpaid from September 2021)	January 2018 – July 2022
Minister of State, Economic Secretary to the Treasury	Richard Fuller (unpaid)	July 2022 – October 2022
Exchequer Secretary to the Treasury	Simon Clarke (paid as a Parliamentary Secretary)	July 2019 – February 2020
Exchequer Secretary to the Treasury	Kemi Badenoch (paid as a Parliamentary Secretary) (jointly with International Trade, Minister for Equalities)	February 2020 – September 2021
Exchequer Secretary to the Treasury	Helen Whately (paid as a Parliamentary Secretary)	September 2021 – July 2022
Exchequer Secretary to the Treasury	Alan Mak	July 2022 – September 2022

Wales Office
Secretary of State for Wales	Simon Hart	December 2019 – July 2022
Secretary of State for Wales	**Robert Buckland**	July 2022 – October 2022
Parliamentary Under-Secretary of State	David Davies (jointly with Whips Office) (unpaid)	December 2019 – October 2022

Work and Pensions
Secretary of State for Work and Pensions	**Therese Coffey**	September 2019 – September 2022
Minister of State for Disabled People, Health and Work	Justin Tomlinson	April 2019 – September 2021
Minister of State for Disabled People, Health and Work	Chloe Smith	September 2021 – September 2022
Parliamentary Under-Secretary of State for Pensions and Financial Inclusion	Guy Opperman	June 2017 – September 2022
Parliamentary Under-Secretary of State for Welfare Delivery	Will Quince	April 2019 – September 2021
Parliamentary Under-Secretary of State for Welfare Delivery	David Rutley	September 2021 – September 2022
Parliamentary Under-Secretary of State (Minister for Employment)	Mims Davies	July 2019 – July 2022
Parliamentary Under-Secretary of State (Minister for Employment)	Julie Marson (also a Whip)	July 2022 – September 2022
Parliamentary Under-Secretary of State (Minister for Work and Pensions)	Deborah Stedman-Scott, Baroness Stedman-Scott (jointly with Foreign Office from September 2021)	July 2019 – September 2022

=== Law officers ===
Attorney General's Office
Attorney General for England and Wales	Geoffrey Cox	July 2019 – February 2020
Attorney General for England and Wales	Suella Braverman	February 2020 – March 2021
Attorney General for England and Wales	Michael Ellis	March 2021 – September 2021
Attorney General for England and Wales	**Suella Braverman**	September 2021 – September 2022
Solicitor General for England and Wales	Michael Ellis	July 2019 – March 2021
Solicitor General for England and Wales	Lucy Frazer	March 2021 – September 2021
Solicitor General for England and Wales	Michael Ellis	September 2021
Solicitor General for England and Wales	Alex Chalk	September 2021 – July 2022
Solicitor General for England and Wales	Edward Timpson	July 2022 – September 2022
Minister on Leave	Suella Braverman	March 2021 – September 2021

Office of the Advocate General
Advocate General for Scotland	Richard Keen, Baron Keen of Elie	May 2015 – September 2020
Advocate General for Scotland	Keith Stewart, Baron Stewart of Dirleton	October 2020 – July 2024

=== Parliament ===
House Leaders
Leader of the House of Lords; Lord Keeper of the Privy Seal	**Natalie Evans, Baroness Evans of Bowes Park**	July 2016 – September 2022
Leader of the House of Commons; Lord President of the Council	Jacob Rees-Mogg	July 2019 – February 2022
Leader of the House of Commons; Lord President of the Council	**Mark Spencer**	February 2022 – September 2022
Deputy Leader of the House of Lords	Frederick Curzon, 7th Earl Howe (unpaid)	May 2015 – July 2024
Parliamentary Secretary of State; Deputy Leader of the House of Commons	Peter Bone	July 2022 – September 2022

House of Commons Whips
Chief Whip of the House of Commons; Parliamentary Secretary to the Treasury	Mark Spencer	July 2019 – February 2022
Chief Whip of the House of Commons; Parliamentary Secretary to the Treasury	**Chris Heaton-Harris**	February 2022 – September 2022
Deputy Chief Whip; Treasurer of HM Household	Amanda Milling	July 2019 – February 2020
Deputy Chief Whip; Treasurer of HM Household	Stuart Andrew	February 2020 – February 2022
Deputy Chief Whip; Treasurer of HM Household	Christopher Pincher	February 2022 – June 2022
Deputy Chief Whip; Treasurer of HM Household	Kelly Tolhurst	July 2022 – September 2022
Whip; Comptroller of HM Household	Mike Freer	December 2019 – September 2021
Whip; Comptroller of HM Household	Marcus Jones	September 2021 – July 2022
Whip; Comptroller of HM Household	Rebecca Harris	July 2022 – July 2024
Whip; Vice-Chamberlain of the Household	Stuart Andrew	July 2019 – February 2020
Whip; Vice-Chamberlain of the Household	Marcus Jones	February 2020 – September 2021
Whip; Vice-Chamberlain of the Household	James Morris	September 2021 – July 2022
Whip; Vice-Chamberlain of the Household	Michael Tomlinson	July 2022 – September 2022
Whips; Lords Commissioners of the Treasury	Michelle Donelan	July 2019 – February 2020
Whips; Lords Commissioners of the Treasury	Rebecca Harris	July 2019 – July 2022
Whips; Lords Commissioners of the Treasury	David Rutley	July 2019 – September 2021
Whips; Lords Commissioners of the Treasury	Maggie Throup (unpaid)	September 2019 – September 2021
Whips; Lords Commissioners of the Treasury	Iain Stewart	December 2019 – June 2020
Whips; Lords Commissioners of the Treasury	Douglas Ross (unpaid, jointly with Scottish Office)	December 2019 – February 2020
Whips; Lords Commissioners of the Treasury	James Morris	February 2020 – September 2021
Whips; Lords Commissioners of the Treasury	Michael Tomlinson	February 2020 – July 2022
Whips; Lords Commissioners of the Treasury	David Duguid	June 2020 – April 2021
Whips; Lords Commissioners of the Treasury	Scott Mann	January 2021 – April 2021
Whips; Lords Commissioners of the Treasury	Alan Mak (unpaid)	April 2021 – July 2022
Whips; Lords Commissioners of the Treasury	Lee Rowley (also a PUSS at Business, Energy and Industrial Strategy)	September 2021 – July 2022
Whips; Lords Commissioners of the Treasury	Amanda Solloway	September 2021 – July 2022
Whips; Lords Commissioners of the Treasury	Craig Whittaker	September 2021 – February 2022, July 2022 – September 2022
Whips; Lords Commissioners of the Treasury	Gareth Johnson	February 2022 – September 2022
Whips; Lords Commissioners of the Treasury	James Duddridge	July 2022 – September 2022
Whips; Lords Commissioners of the Treasury	Scott Mann	July 2022 – September 2022
Whips; Lords Commissioners of the Treasury	David TC Davies (jointly with Wales Office)	July 2022 – September 2022
Assistant Whips	Leo Docherty	July 2019 – April 2021
Assistant Whips	Nigel Huddleston (unpaid, jointly with DCMS from Feb 2020) (no longer unpaid)	July 2019 – September 2021
Assistant Whips	Marcus Jones	July 2019 – February 2020
Assistant Whips	James Morris	July 2019 – February 2020
Assistant Whips	Tom Pursglove	July 2019 – September 2021
Assistant Whips	David TC Davies (unpaid, jointly with Wales Office (no longer unpaid))	December 2019 – July 2022
Assistant Whips	Maria Caulfield	December 2019 – September 2021
Assistant Whips	Alex Chalk (unpaid, jointly with Justice) (no longer unpaid)	February 2020 – September 2021
Assistant Whips	Eddie Hughes	February 2020 – January 2021
Assistant Whips	David Duguid	April 2021 – September 2021
Assistant Whips	Scott Mann	April 2021 – July 2022
Assistant Whips	Heather Wheeler (also with Cabinet Office from February 2022)	September 2021 – July 2022
Assistant Whips	Andrea Jenkyns	September 2021 – July 2022
Assistant Whips	Steve Double	September 2021 – July 2022
Assistant Whips	Gareth Johnson	September 2021 – February 2022
Assistant Whips	James Cartlidge (also a PUSS at Justice)	September 2021 – July 2022
Assistant Whips	Sarah Dines	February 2022 – July 2022
Assistant Whips	Stuart Anderson	July 2022 – February 2023
Assistant Whips	David Morris	July 2022 – September 2022
Assistant Whips	Suzanne Webb	July 2022 – September 2022
Assistant Whips	Adam Holloway	July 2022 – September 2022
Assistant Whips	Joy Morrissey	July 2022 – July 2024
Assistant Whips	Sir David Evennett	July 2022 – September 2022
Assistant Whips	Julie Marson (also a PUSS at Work & Pensions)	July 2022 – September 2022

House of Lords Whips
Captain of the Honourable Corps of Gentlemen-at-Arms; Chief Whip of the House of Lords]	Henry Ashton, 4th Baron Ashton of Hyde	July 2019 – September 2022
Captain of the Yeomen of the Guard; Deputy Chief Whip	Patrick Stopford, 9th Earl of Courtown	July 2016 – July 2024
Baronesses and Lords in waiting	Elizabeth Berridge, Baroness Berridge also a joint Parliamentary Under-Secretary of State at Education and International Trade from February 2020	July 2019 – March 2020
Baronesses and Lords in waiting	Olivia Bloomfield, Baroness Bloomfield of Hinton Waldrist	July 2019 – June 2023
Baronesses and Lords in waiting	James Bethell, 5th Baron Bethell (unpaid)	July 2019 – March 2020
Baronesses and Lords in waiting	Carlyn Chisholm, Baroness Chisholm of Owlpen	August 2019 – February 2020, September 2021 – February 2022
Baronesses and Lords in waiting	Amanda Sater, Baroness Sater	December 2019 – January 2020
Baronesses and Lords in waiting	Stephen Parkinson, Baron Parkinson of Whitley Bay also a Parliamentary Under-Secretary of State at Digital, Culture, Media and Sport from September 2021	February 2020 – September 2022
Baronesses and Lords in waiting	Jane Scott, Baroness Scott of Bybrook	February 2020 – September 2022
Baronesses and Lords in waiting	James Younger, 5th Viscount Younger of Leckie	February 2020 – January 2023
Baronesses and Lords in waiting	Joanna Penn, Baroness Penn	March 2020 – September 2021, February 2022 – September 2022
Baronesses and Lords in waiting	Andrew Sharpe, Baron Sharpe of Epsom (unpaid)	October 2021 – September 2022
Minister on Leave	Joanna Penn, Baroness Penn	September 2021 – February 2022

== See also ==
- First Johnson ministry
- Johnson cabinets, of Boris Johnson as Mayor of London.

== Notes ==
Preceded by First Johnson ministry	Government of the United Kingdom; 2019–2022	Succeeded by Truss ministry
