= Marcus Jones (politician) =

British politician (born 1974)

The Right Honourable Sir Marcus Jones
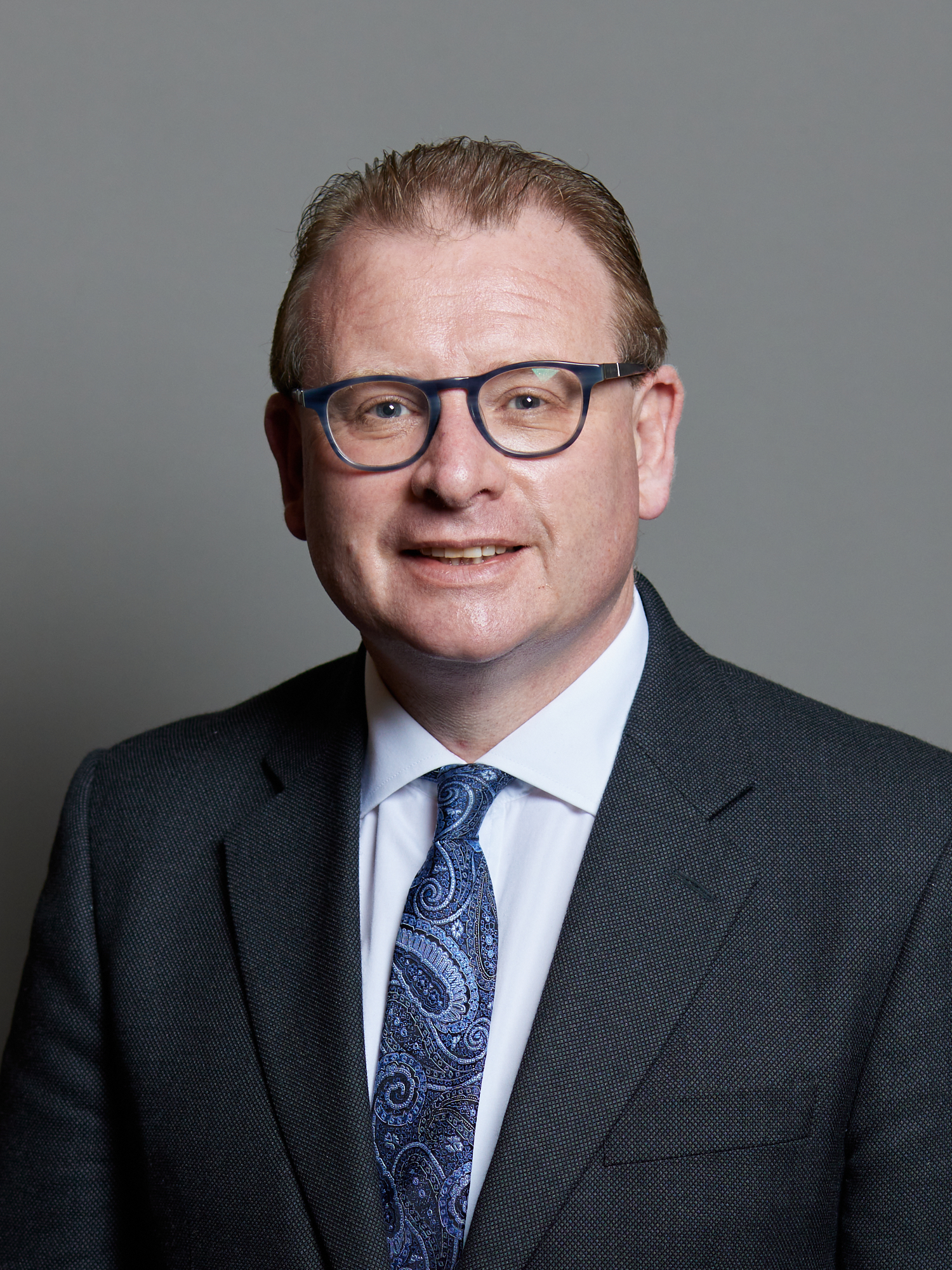
- Official portrait, 2021

Government Deputy Chief Whip Treasurer of the Household
- In office 27 October 2022 – 5 July 2024
- Prime Minister: Rishi Sunak
- Preceded by: Craig Whittaker
- Succeeded by: Mark Tami

Minister of State for Housing
- In office 8 July 2022 – 7 September 2022
- Prime Minister: Boris Johnson
- Preceded by: Stuart Andrew
- Succeeded by: Lee Rowley

Comptroller of the Household
- In office 17 September 2021 – 8 July 2022
- Prime Minister: Boris Johnson
- Preceded by: Mike Freer
- Succeeded by: Rebecca Harris

Vice-Chamberlain of the Household
- In office 13 February 2020 – 17 September 2021
- Prime Minister: Boris Johnson
- Preceded by: Stuart Andrew
- Succeeded by: James Morris

Vice Chairman of the Conservative Party for Local Government
- In office 8 January 2018 – 13 February 2020
- Leader: Theresa May; Boris Johnson
- Succeeded by: Vacant

Parliamentary Under-Secretary of State for Local Government
- In office 8 May 2015 – 8 January 2018
- Prime Minister: David Cameron; Theresa May
- Preceded by: Brandon Lewis
- Succeeded by: Heather Wheeler (Housing and Homelessness); Rishi Sunak (Local Government)

Member of Parliament for Nuneaton
- In office 6 May 2010 – 30 May 2024
- Preceded by: Bill Olner
- Succeeded by: Jodie Gosling

Personal details
- Born: 5 April 1974 (age 52) Nuneaton, Warwickshire, England
- Party: Conservative
- Website: www.marcusjones.org.uk

Sir Marcus Charles Jones (born 5 April 1974) is a British Conservative Party politician who was the Member of Parliament (MP) for Nuneaton from 2010 to 2024. Previously he had been the Leader of Nuneaton and Bedworth Borough Council. He had previously served as Government Deputy Chief Whip and Treasurer of the Household since October 2022.

He was appointed Minister of State for Housing in the July 2022 British cabinet reshuffle. He served until September 2022. He stood as a candidate for Nuneaton in the 2024 general election, when he lost his seat.

== Education and early career ==
Marcus Jones was born in Nuneaton on 5 April 1974 and has lived in the town all his life. He grew up in the suburb of Whitestone and was educated at St Thomas More Catholic School and King Edward VI College. Before becoming and MP, he worked as a conveyancing manager at Tustain Jones & Co., solicitors in Coventry and Nuneaton.

== Local government ==
Jones stood unsuccessfully as the Conservative candidate in the Wem Brook ward of Nuneaton and Bedworth Council in 2002 and 2004, before being elected in the Whitestone ward in 2005. He was Conservative group leader from 2006 to 2009. In 2008 Marcus became the first Conservative Leader of Nuneaton and Bedworth, in the council's 34-year history. He served as council leader and was also the council's portfolio holder for Finance and Civic Affairs from 2006 to 2009, before standing down to concentrate on his parliamentary campaign. Jones stood down before the local elections in May 2010 and the Conservatives retained his seat, although they lost control of the council.

== House of Commons ==
Jones was first elected to the House of Commons in 2010, as the Member of Parliament for Nuneaton with a majority of 2,069 votes. His victory overturned a notional Labour majority of 3,850 and, as a result, he became the first Conservative MP for the town since 1992.

As an MP, Jones has campaigned for a PFI rebate, and was a member of the PFI Rebate campaign of more than 80 MPs, from all three major parties, who called for savings on PFI.

Jones's voting record is and has been widely inline with the rest of the Conservative party's MP's, however, there are notable exceptions, for example, Jones has voted against same-sex marriage for LGBT+ people. Jones has also voted multiple times to repeal the Human Rights Act (1998) and voted against largely retaining the EU "Charter of Fundamental Rights" as part of UK law following the UK's withdrawal from the European Union.

Jones is Chairman of the All-Party Parliamentary Group for Town Centres and is also an Ambassador the Federation of Small Businesses' Keep Trade Local campaign.

In the general election in 2015 Nuneaton was Labour's target number 38, but Jones won the seat for a second time.

As of May 2015, Jones became Parliamentary Under-Secretary of State at the Department for Communities and Local Government in the first Cameron ministry, the first Conservative Majority Government for 18 years.

In January 2016, in response to a proposed law that all rented houses should be fit for human habitation, he said: "New clause 52 would result in unnecessary regulation and cost to landlords which would deter further investment and push up rents for tenants. Of course we believe that all homes should be of a decent standard and all tenants should have a safe place to live regardless of tenure, but local authorities already have strong and effective powers to deal with poor quality and safe accommodation and we expect them to use them." He voted against the proposed law, but was not one of the 72 Conservative MPs who did so whilst also being landlords themselves.

In May 2016, it emerged that Jones was one of a number of Conservative MPs being investigated by police in the United Kingdom general election, 2015 party spending investigation, for allegedly spending more than the legal limit on constituency election campaign expenses. However, in May 2017, the Crown Prosecution Service said that while there was evidence of inaccurate spending returns, it did not "meet the test" for further action.

Jones was re-elected in the 2017 general election, and during the first cabinet reshuffle of the second May ministry, he was appointed Vice-Chair of the Conservative Party, with responsibility for Local Government.

He was again re-elected in the 2019 general election, with an increased majority of over 13,000 votes.

On 13 February 2020, Jones was appointed Vice-Chamberlain of the Household (Government Whip) during a cabinet reshuffle. On 17 September 2021, he was appointed Comptroller of the Household, a senior Government Whip, in the second cabinet reshuffle of the second Johnson ministry. In that role, he took part in the 2023 Coronation.

In the House of Commons, Jones sat on the Administration Committee and Backbench Business Committee, and served on the Speakers Committee on the Electoral Commission.

On 8 July 2022, Jones was appointed as Housing Minister following the resignation of Stuart Andrew during the July 2022 United Kingdom government crisis.

On 8 March 2023, he was appointed as a member of the Privy Council.

== Post-parliamentary career ==
Following his defeat at the 2024 UK General Election, Jones has worked as a freelance business consultant.

== Personal life ==
Marcus Jones lives with his wife Suzanne and has two children.

== See also ==
- Nuneaton
- Nuneaton and Bedworth
- Conservative Party
- Nuneaton Constituency

Parliament of the United Kingdom
Preceded by Bill Olner	Member of Parliament for Nuneaton; 2010–2024	Succeeded by Jodie Gosling
Party political offices
Preceded by Craig Whittaker	Conservative Deputy Chief Whip in the House of Commons; 2022–2024	Vacant Title next held by Joy Morrissey; Gagan Mohindra
