= Minister of State for the Future of Work =

Ministerial position in the British government

United Kingdom Minister of State for the Future of Work
- Royal Arms of His Majesty's Government

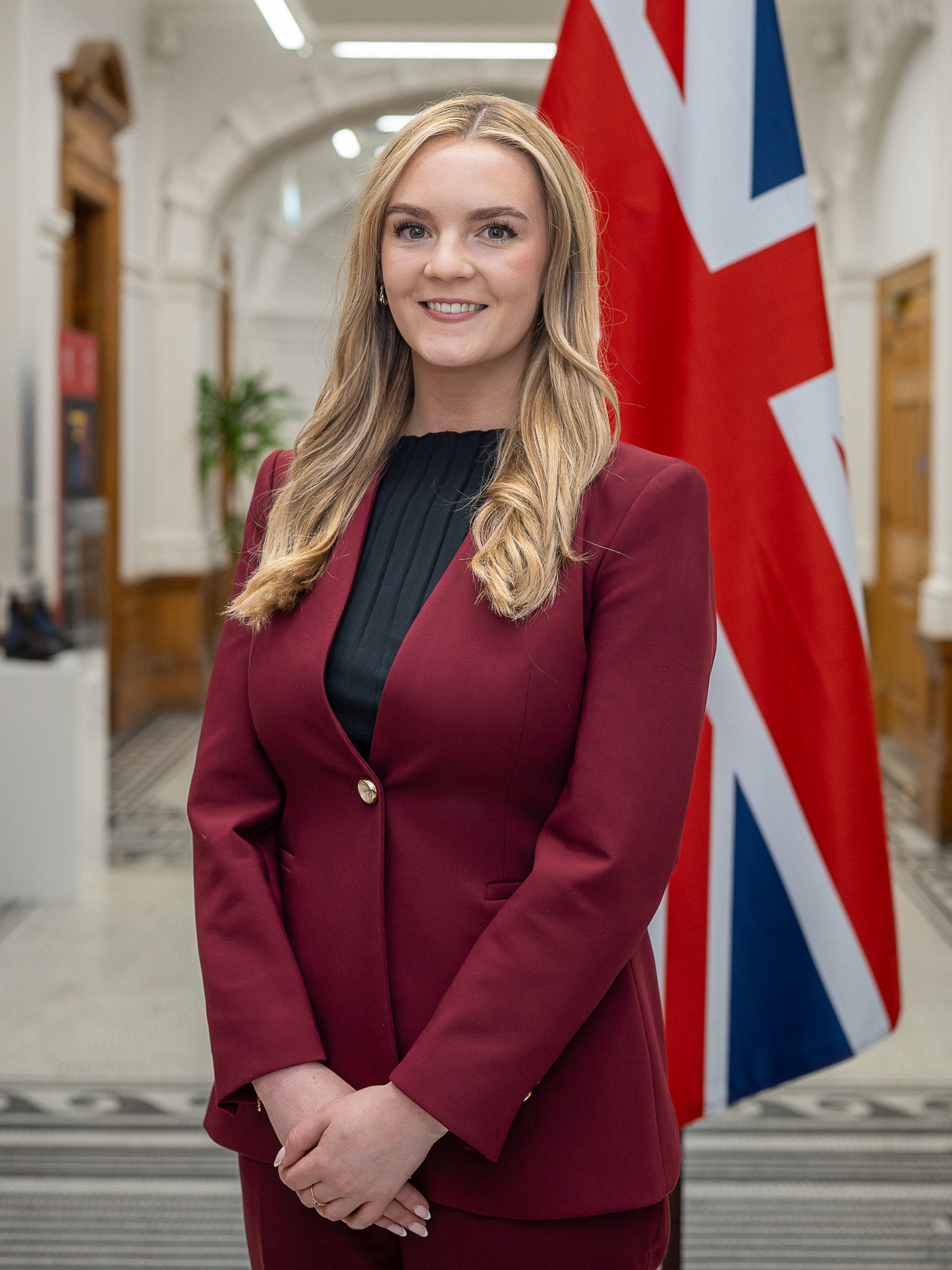
- Incumbent; Kate Dearden since 7 September 2025
- Department for Business, Innovation, Science and Trade
- Nominator: Prime Minister of the United Kingdom
- Appointer: The Monarch; on the advice of the Prime Minister
- Term length: At His Majesty's pleasure
- Website: www.gov.uk/government/ministers/minister-of-state--221

The Minister of State for the Future of Work is a ministerial position in the Department for Business, Innovation, Science and Trade in the British Government.

The position was previously housed within the Department for Business, Innovation and Skills and the Department for Business, Energy and Industrial Strategy

== Responsibilities ==
As of 2023, the Minister has the following areas of regulation and governance within their portfolio:

- Make Work Pay
- industrial relations
- parental leave and pay review
- labour market enforcement
- consumer protection
- competition policy
- retail and hospitality
- consumer goods
- product safety
- Post Office
- postal services
- Covid loans
- AI and the workforce
- Post Office
- Low Pay Commission
- Advisory, Conciliation and Arbitration Service (Acas)
- Fair Work Agency
- Pubs Code Adjudicator
- British Hallmarking Council
- Competition and Markets Authority
- Competition Service
- Competition Appeal Tribunal
- Central Arbitration Committee
- Certification Officer

== List of ministers ==
Name	Portrait	Took office	Left office	Political party	Prime Minister
Parliamentary Under Secretary of State for Small Firms, Trade & Industry
Barbara Roche; MP for Hornsey and Wood Green		6 May 1997	4 January 1999	Labour	Blair I
Michael Wills; MP for North Swindon		4 January 1999	29 July 1999	Labour	Blair I
Alan Johnson; MP for Kingston upon Hull West and Hessle		29 July 1999	7 June 2001	Labour	Blair I
Parliamentary Under Secretary of State for Competition, Consumers & Markets
Melanie Johnson; MP for Welwyn Hatfield		8 June 2001	13 June 2003	Labour	Blair II
Parliamentary Under Secretary of State for Employment Relations & Consumer Affairs
Gerry Sutcliffe; MP for Bradford South		13 June 2003	5 May 2006	Labour	Blair II & III
Jim Fitzpatrick; MP for Poplar and Canning Town		5 May 2006	28 June 2007	Labour	Blair III
Minister of State for Employment Relations
Pat McFadden; MP for Wolverhampton South East		28 June 2007	5 June 2009	Labour	Brown
Minister of State for Business, Innovation, and Skills
Pat McFadden; MP for Wolverhampton South East		9 June 2009	11 May 2010	Labour	Brown
Minister of State for Business and Enterprise
Mark Prisk; MP for Hertford and Stortford		13 May 2010	4 September 2012	Conservative	Cameron–Clegg
Michael Fallon; MP for Sevenoaks		4 September 2012	15 July 2014	Conservative	Cameron–Clegg
Matt Hancock; MP for West Suffolk		15 July 2014	11 May 2015	Conservative	Cameron–Clegg
Minister of State for Small Business, Industry and Enterprise
Anna Soubry; MP for Broxtowe		11 May 2015	15 July 2016	Conservative	Cameron II
Parliamentary Under-Secretary of State for Small Business, Consumers and Corporate Responsibility
Margot James; MP for Stourbridge		17 July 2016	9 January 2018	Conservative	May I & II
Andrew Griffiths; MP for Burton		9 January 2018	13 July 2018	Conservative	May II
Kelly Tolhurst; MP for Rochester and Strood		19 July 2018	13 February 2020	Conservative	May II Johnson I & II
Parliamentary Under-Secretary of State for Small Business, Consumers and Labour Markets
Paul Scully; MP for Sutton and Cheam		13 February 2020	8 July 2022	Conservative	Johnson II
Jane Hunt; MP for Loughborough		8 July 2022	8 September 2022	Conservative	Johnson II
Parliamentary Under-Secretary of State for Enterprise and Markets
Dean Russell; MP for Watford		20 September 2022	27 October 2022	Conservative	Truss
Parliamentary Under-Secretary of State for Enterprise, Markets and Small Business
Kevin Hollinrake; MP for Thirsk and Malton		27 October 2022	26 March 2024	Conservative	Sunak
Minister of State for Enterprise, Markets and Small Business
Kevin Hollinrake; MP for Thirsk and Malton		26 March 2024	5 July 2024	Conservative	Sunak
Parliamentary Under-Secretary of State for Employment Rights, Competition and Markets
Justin Madders; MP for Ellesmere Port and Bromborough		9 July 2024	7 September 2025	Labour	Starmer
Parliamentary Under-Secretary of State for Employment Rights and Consumer Protection
Kate Dearden; MP for Halifax		7 September 2025	21 July 2026	Labour Co-op	Starmer
Minister of State for the Future of Work
Kate Dearden; MP for Halifax		21 July 2026	Incumbent	Labour Co-op	Burnham
