= Eddie Hughes (British politician) =

British Conservative politician

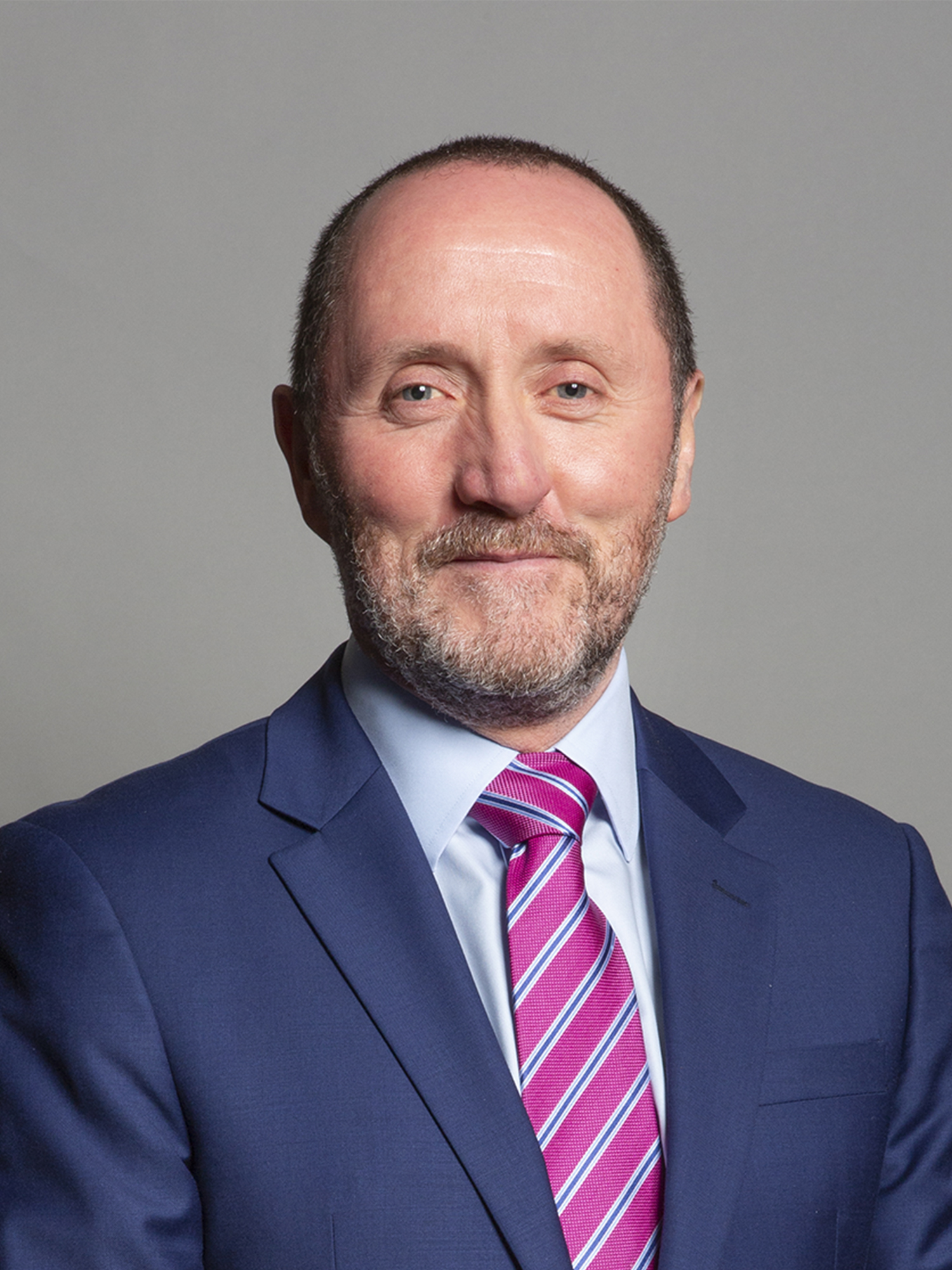
- Official portrait, 2019

Parliamentary Under-Secretary of State for Housing and Homelessness
- In office 16 January 2021 – 8 September 2022
- Prime Minister: Boris Johnson
- Preceded by: Kelly Tolhurst
- Succeeded by: Andrew Stephenson

Member of Parliament for Walsall North
- In office 8 June 2017 – 30 May 2024
- Preceded by: David Winnick
- Succeeded by: constituency abolished

Personal details
- Born: 3 October 1968 (age 58) Birmingham, England
- Party: Conservative
- Spouse: Clare Hughes (m. 2014)
- Children: 2
- Education: University of Glamorgan

Edmund Francis Hughes (born 3 October 1968) is a British Conservative Party politician who served in the Second Johnson ministry as Parliamentary Under-Secretary of State for Rough Sleeping and Housing from 2021 to 2022. He was Member of Parliament (MP) for Walsall North from 2017 to 2024.

He was appointed Parliamentary Under-Secretary of State for Rough Sleeping and Housing by Boris Johnson in January 2021, following the resignation of Kelly Tolhurst. He returned to the backbenches following the formation of the Truss ministry in September 2022.

== Early life and career ==
Hughes was born on 3 October 1968 in Birmingham, England. His parents were Irish immigrants, his mother from the McNally family from Louisburgh Co. Mayo. His father was a bus driver and his mother was a cleaner. He has five brothers and attended Handsworth Grammar School (now King Edward VI Handsworth Grammar School for Boys). Hughes studied civil engineering at the University of Glamorgan.

He was a director of YMCA Birmingham for development and asset management from 2014 to 2017, and assistant chief executive in 2017. He was a trustee of the Walsall Wood Allotment Charity, which helps people in financial need. Hughes served on the West Midlands Police Authority and was chairman of Walsall Housing Group from 2016 until June 2018.

He stood for the Pheasey ward on Walsall Council in 1998, but was unsuccessful. He was, however, elected as a councillor for the Hatherton Rushall ward on Walsall Council in 1999, gaining the seat from Labour, until 2004 when boundary changes occurred and he was elected a councillor for Streetly ward. He has held several positions on the council including the decision-making cabinet, chairman of Children's Services Scrutiny and Audit committees. He left the council in 2018. He stood unsuccessfully for MP of Birmingham Hall Green in 2005.

== Parliamentary career ==
Hughes was elected the MP for Walsall North at the 2017 general election, where he unseated the sitting veteran Labour Party MP David Winnick. The 83-year old Winnick had held the seat for nearly 40 years since the 1979 general election; and apart from a brief period in the 1970s, the seat had been held by Labour since its creation in 1955.

Hughes introduced a Ten Minute Rule bill into the House of Commons to improve tenant safety around carbon monoxide poisoning. It received a first reading on 13 September 2017.

Hughes spoke in the Commons during a debate on NHS pay in September 2017, stating that the starting salary for a newly qualified nurse was higher than that of the average constituent of Walsall North, in defending not lifting a below inflation cap of 1% on public-sector pay increases. He said it was his job to stick up for everyone, not just people in the public sector. Despite his intervention, the opposition motion to lift the cap was passed. The Conservative Government subsequently announced, in March 2018, that they would end the cap on NHS salaries.

Hughes has campaigned for more front line police on the streets and raised the issue with Theresa May in the House of Commons.

He was a supporter of Brexit, campaigning for a leave vote, and was one of 62 Conservative MPs who wrote to the Prime Minister urging support for her Lancaster House speech.

Since being elected in June 2017 Hughes had campaigned for funding for a new A&E department at Walsall Manor Hospital, including raising the issue with the Prime Minister at PMQs. Funding of £36m was eventually allocated by the Department for Health & Social Care in December 2018.

Hughes was a member of the Consolidation Bills Committee and the Women & Equalities Select Committee.

Hughes was made a Parliamentary Private Secretary to the ministerial team of the Ministry of Housing, Communities and Local Government in June 2018. During his time as PPS at MHLG Hughes was responsible for liaising with parliamentary colleagues in respect of revisions to the National Planning Policy Framework which was subsequently published in July 2018. He subsequently moved with Dominic Raab to the Department for Exiting the European Union. He resigned to vote against the Withdrawal Agreement on 15 January 2019. From February 2020 to January 2021, he was an Assistant Whip.

As chair of the APPG for Excellence in the Built Environment Hughes chaired the committee's inquiry into the need for a New Homes Ombudsman which was published in June 2018. In October 2018 the government announced that there will be a New Homes Ombudsman – "a watchdog that will champion homebuyers, protect their interests and hold developers to account."

He joined the government in January 2021, being appointed as the Parliamentary Under-Secretary of State for Rough Sleeping and Housing at the Ministry of Housing, Communities and Local Government due to the resignation of Kelly Tolhurst. For a brief period following the series of mass Ministerial resignations in July 2022 which led to Boris Johnson's resignation, and the subsequent firing of Michael Gove, Hughes was left as the sole serving minister within the department.

Hughes endorsed Kemi Badenoch during the July 2022 Conservative Party leadership election. He spoke at her campaign launch event held on 12 July.

On 9 May 2023 Hughes claimed in a letter to Walsall Academy that 'one female pupil has developed a UTI' as she didn't feel comfortable using gender-neutral toilets. On 1 May 2024 Kemi Badenoch's office used this as evidence for Badenoch's claim that girls at a school who did not want to use gender-neutral toilets developed urinary tract infections.

He announced in March 2023 that he would stand down as MP for Walsall North at the 2024 general election. Walsall North was abolished in the 2023 Periodic Review of Westminster constituencies. In June 2023, he was selected as the Conservative Party prospective parliamentary candidate for Tamworth, formerly a safe seat for the Conservatives which elected Chris Pincher in the 2010, 2015, 2017, and 2019 general elections. At the 2024 general election, Hughes was defeated in Tamworth by the Labour candidate, Sarah Edwards.

=== Other political work ===
Hughes worked with libertarian Conservative think tank Freer UK, with whom he released a report on blockchain technologies, advocating that the UK government appoint a Chief Blockchain Officer.

== Post-parliamentary career ==
Following his defeat at the 2024 UK General Election, Hughes has worked as a Housing Policy Consultant for the National Federation of Builders, and a Project Director at Church Development Agency Limited.

== Personal life ==
He married Clare in 2014. Hughes has a son and daughter from a previous marriage. His brother Des is a Labour councillor.

Hughes is an Aston Villa F.C. fan and a Roman Catholic.

Parliament of the United Kingdom
Preceded by David Winnick	Member of Parliament for Walsall North; 2017–present	Constituency abolished
