= Luke Hall (politician) =

British politician

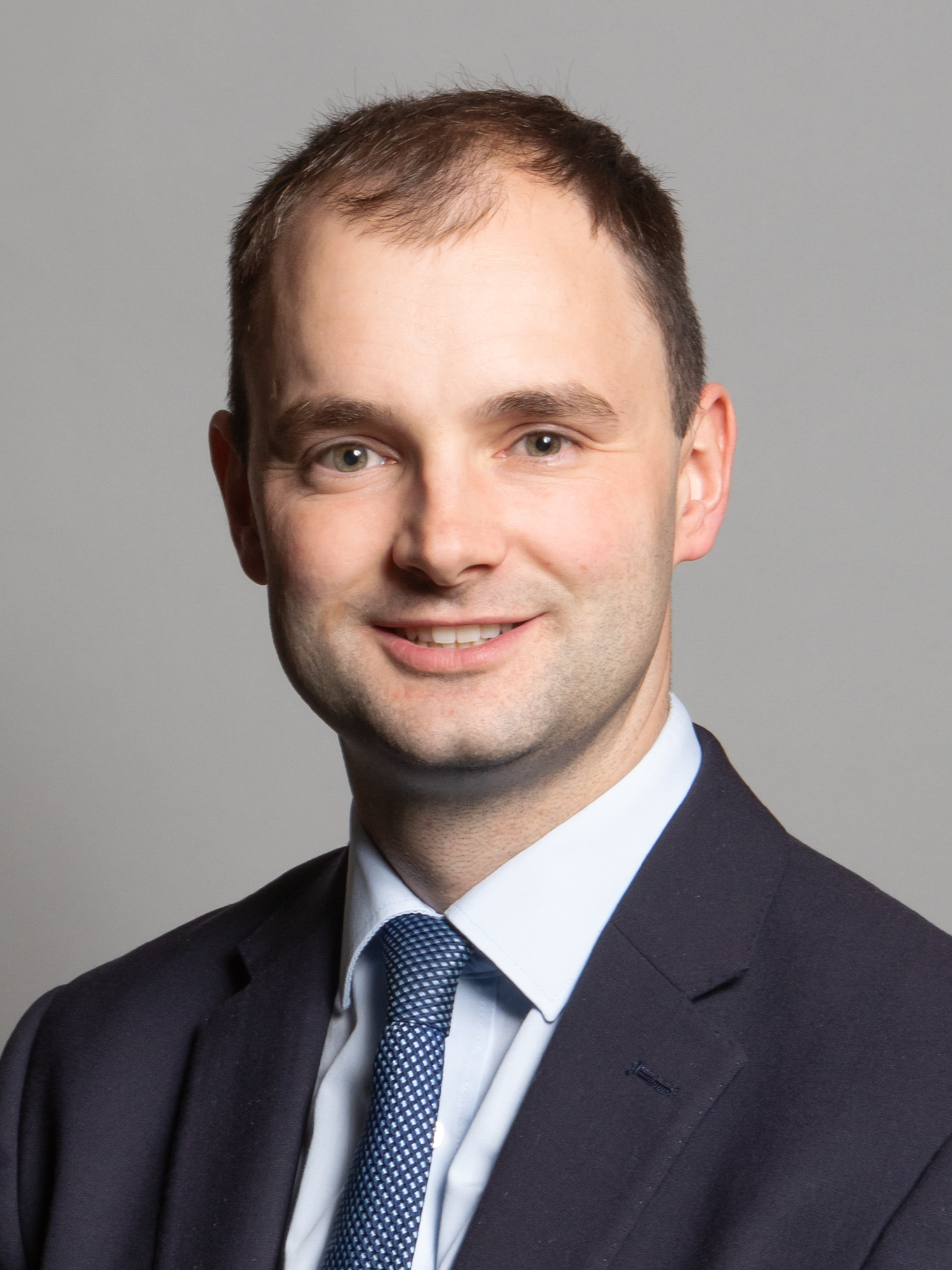
- Official portrait, 2020

Minister of State for Skills, Apprenticeships and Higher Education
- In office 26 March 2024 – 5 July 2024
- Prime Minister: Rishi Sunak
- Preceded by: Robert Halfon
- Succeeded by: The Baroness Smith of Malvern

Deputy Chairman of the Conservative Party
- In office 7 February 2023 – 26 March 2024
- Leader: Rishi Sunak
- Succeeded by: Jonathan Gullis; Angela Richardson
- In office 8 February 2022 – 7 July 2022
- Leader: Boris Johnson

Minister of State for Regional Growth and Local Government
- In office 8 September 2020 – 15 September 2021
- Prime Minister: Boris Johnson
- Preceded by: Simon Clarke
- Succeeded by: Kemi Badenoch

Parliamentary Under-Secretary of State for Rough Sleeping and Housing (Note: Local Government from 2019 to April 2020.)
- In office 27 July 2019 – 8 September 2020
- Prime Minister: Boris Johnson
- Preceded by: Heather Wheeler
- Succeeded by: Kelly Tolhurst

Member of Parliament for Thornbury and Yate
- In office 7 May 2015 – 30 May 2024
- Preceded by: Steve Webb
- Succeeded by: Claire Young

Personal details
- Born: 8 July 1986 (age 40) Westerleigh, Gloucestershire, England
- Party: Conservative
- Website: Official website

Luke Anthony Hall (born 8 July 1986) is a British Conservative former politician and former retail manager who served as Member of Parliament (MP) for Thornbury and Yate from 2015 until May 2024. He served as Minister of State for Regional Growth and Local Government from 2020 to 2021, Deputy Chairman of the Conservative Party from February to July 2022 and from 2023 to 2024, and Minister of State for Skills, Apprenticeships and Higher Education from March to July 2024.

== Early life and career ==
Luke Hall was born on 8 July 1986 in Westerleigh, Gloucestershire, and grew up in South Gloucestershire. He worked for the supermarket chain Lidl from the age of 18 and became manager of their Yate store, before going on to become Area Manager for Farmfoods.

Hall became an active member of the Conservative Party aged 23 and went on to become Constituency Chairman for the party in South Gloucestershire and Deputy Chairman of the Bristol and South Gloucestershire Conservatives.

== Parliamentary career ==
Hall was selected as the Conservative prospective parliamentary candidate for Thornbury and Yate in December 2013. At the 2015 general election, Hall was elected to Parliament as MP for Thornbury and Yate with 41% of the vote and a majority of 1,495.

In May 2016, it emerged that Hall was one of a number of Conservative MPs being investigated by police in the United Kingdom general election, 2015 party spending investigation, for allegedly spending more than the legal limit on constituency election campaign expenses. However, in May 2017, the Crown Prosecution Service said that while there was evidence of inaccurate spending returns, it did not "meet the test" for further action.

Hall was opposed to Brexit prior to the 2016 referendum. Since the result was announced, Hall has continued to support the official position of his party and now advocates leaving the European Union.

At the snap 2017 general election, Hall was re-elected as MP for Thornbury and Yate with an increased vote share of 55.3% and an increased majority of 12,071. After the election, he was made a Parliamentary Private Secretary to the ministerial team in the Department for Education.

In July 2019, Hall joined the Department for Housing, Communities and Local Government as Parliamentary Under-Secretary of State.

Hall was again re-elected at the 2019 general election with an increased vote share of 57.8% and an increased majority of 12,369.

In April 2020, he was appointed to focus on rough sleeping and housing. In June 2020, Hall proposed to reduce homelessness during the coronavirus pandemic by calling on local councils to encourage rough sleepers to "move in with family and friends". His portfolio changed to the Minister of State focusing on regional growth and local government at the Ministry of Housing, Communities and Local Government, when he replaced Simon Clarke in September 2020.

On 16 September 2021, Hall left the government during the second cabinet reshuffle of the second Johnson ministry and returned to the backbenches.

In February 2022, he was appointed Deputy Chair of the Conservative Party by Johnson. On 7 July 2022, Hall resigned from this position, after over 50 other resignations during the July 2022 United Kingdom government crisis. In February 2023, he was re-appointed Deputy Chair of the Conservative Party by Rishi Sunak.

In March 2024, he was appointed to replace Robert Halfon as Minister of State for Skills, Apprenticeships and Higher Education.

== Post-parliamentary career ==
Following his defeat at the 2024 election, Hall was appointed as Head of External Affairs and Engagement at National Grid. In February 2026, Hall was appointed at the first ever CEO of the Charity Tax Group, an organisation that "campaigns for the fairer tax treatment of charities to allow them to maximise the public benefit impact of their work".

== Personal life ==
Hall lives with his wife in Horton, Gloucestershire, and in London.

== Notes ==
Parliament of the United Kingdom
Preceded by Steve Webb	Member of Parliament for Thornbury and Yate; 2015–2024	Succeeded by Claire Young
