= Heather Wheeler =

British politician (born 1959)

Heather Wheeler OBE
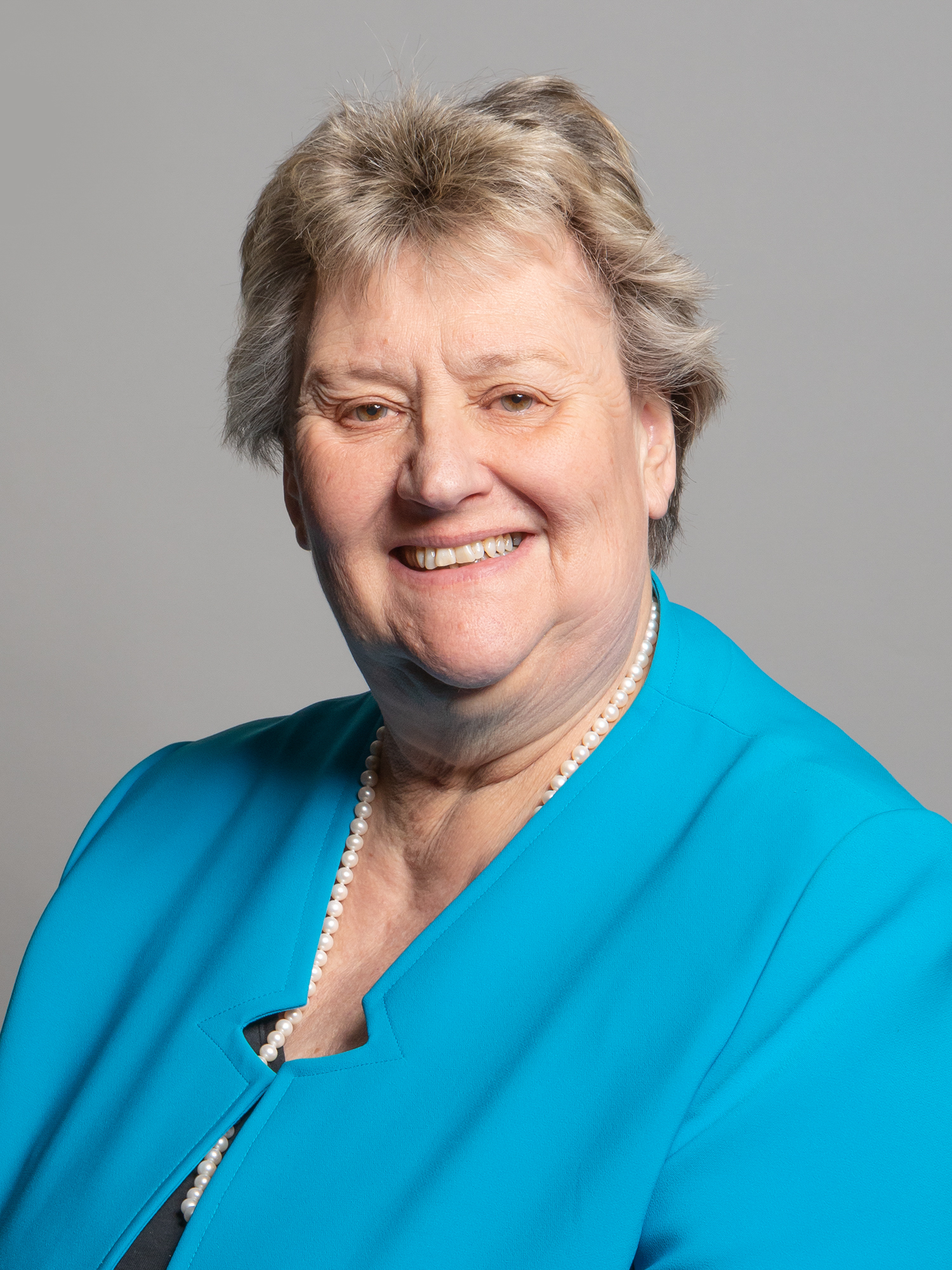
- Official portrait, 2020

Parliamentary Secretary for the Cabinet Office
- In office 8 February 2022 – 7 September 2022
- Prime Minister: Boris Johnson
- Preceded by: Julia Lopez
- Succeeded by: Brendan Clarke-Smith

Parliamentary Under-Secretary of State for Asia and the Pacific
- In office 26 July 2019 – 13 February 2020
- Prime Minister: Boris Johnson
- Preceded by: Mark Field
- Succeeded by: Nigel Adams

Parliamentary Under-Secretary of State for Housing and Homelessness
- In office 9 January 2018 – 26 July 2019
- Prime Minister: Theresa May
- Preceded by: Marcus Jones
- Succeeded by: Luke Hall

Lord Commissioner of the Treasury
- In office 15 June 2017 – 9 January 2018
- Prime Minister: Theresa May
- Preceded by: Guy Opperman
- Succeeded by: Rebecca Harris

Member of Parliament for South Derbyshire
- In office 6 May 2010 – 30 May 2024
- Preceded by: Mark Todd
- Succeeded by: Samantha Niblett

Personal details
- Born: 14 May 1959 (age 67) Norwich, Norfolk, England
- Party: Conservative
- Spouse: Robert Wheeler (d. 2018)
- Children: 1
- Website: heatherwheeler.org.uk

Heather Kay Wheeler (née Wilkinson; born 14 May 1959) is a British Conservative Party politician, who was first elected at the 2010 general election as the member of Parliament (MP) for South Derbyshire, taking the seat from the Labour Party after 13 years. In the 2024 general election she lost the seat to the Labour party candidate, Samantha Niblett, on a swing of over 22%

== Early life and local government career ==
Wheeler was born in Norwich, Norfolk on 14 May 1959. She was brought up in Wandsworth, London. She was educated at Grey Coat Hospital, an all-girls state school in Westminster, London.

She was elected a Conservative member for West Hill ward on Wandsworth London Borough Council at the age of 23 in 1982. After serving a full council term, she married Robert Wheeler, moving in 1986 to Bretby, South Derbyshire.

After working for Lloyd's insurance brokers for 10 years, qualifying by exam as an Associate, she became a member of the Chartered Insurance Institute.

Wheeler was first elected to South Derbyshire District Council in 1995 for the safe Conservative seat of Repton. She went on to become leader of the council's Conservative group and became Leader of the Council between 2007 and 2010. She was re-elected as a councillor for Repton ward until 2011; her daughter Harriet unsuccessfully stood as a Conservative candidate in Swadlincote ward in 2011, whilst husband Bob successfully defended his marginal Linton ward and continued as Leader of the council.

== Parliamentary career ==
Wheeler stood unsuccessfully at the 2001 and 2005 general elections as her party's candidate for Coventry South. Wheeler was a member of the Conservative Party's A-List prior to being selected to contest the South Derbyshire constituency. At the 2010 general election, she gained the seat from Labour with a majority of 7,128; there was a 9.8% swing to the Conservatives. Following her election as a Member of Parliament she stood aside as Conservative council group leader. She was re-elected in 2015 and 2017, with the former defying polling that suggested her seat would be vulnerable following the Conservative Government's failure to award a major contract to local train manufacturer Bombardier.

In the House of Commons she sat on the Standards and Privileges Committee, the European Scrutiny Committee and the Communities and Local Government Committee. She was also a member of the Public Bill Committee for the Defence Reform Act 2014.

Wheeler was one of 79 Conservative MPs who supported a 2011 rebel motion calling for a referendum on the European Union. She also joined a 2013 rebel amendment expressing regret at not including the referendum in the government's plans. She subsequently backed the government's plans to hold a referendum in 2017 and opposed a proposal to hold it in 2014. Wheeler backed Leave in the referendum.

On 9 January 2018, Wheeler was appointed Parliamentary Under-Secretary of State at the Ministry of Housing, Communities and Local Government, with responsibility for homelessness and rough sleeping as well as the private rented and leasehold sectors, in the second May ministry.

In March 2018, following her promotion to a Government position with responsibility for homelessness, Wheeler told The Guardian newspaper that she did not know why the number of rough sleepers had increased in recent years. Wheeler rejected the suggestion that welfare reforms and council cuts relating to her Government had contributed to the rise. Earlier in the same month, Wheeler promised to resign if the number of people rough sleeping got worse while she was in office.

On 26 July 2019, Wheeler was appointed as the Parliamentary under-secretary of state for Asia and the Pacific at the Foreign and Commonwealth Office in the first Johnson ministry. She resigned for family reasons in February 2020.

In 2021, she unsuccessfully ran for election to become chair of the 1922 Committee.

On 17 September 2021, Wheeler was appointed an assistant Government whip in the second cabinet reshuffle of the second Johnson ministry.

Wheeler was appointed Officer of the Order of the British Empire (OBE) in the 2023 Birthday Honours for political and public service.

In June 2023, she was one of six Conservative MPs to vote against censuring Boris Johnson following the Commons Privileges Committee investigation.

== Controversies ==
In August 2016, following the 2016 Rio Olympics, the European Union social media account shared a modified medals table showing its combined member states in first place. Wheeler tweeted in response that the British Empire had won the 2016 Rio Olympics along with a map of former imperial territories. Her comments were described by Labour MP David Lammy as "deeply offensive to so many people and their ancestors". Wheeler rejected calls to apologise, stating that her comments were "tongue-in-cheek".

In June 2019, it was revealed that in October 2017, three months before she became minister, and whilst she was the Parliamentary Under-Secretary of State for Housing and Homelessness, Wheeler described rough sleepers in her constituency as "the traditional type, old tinkers, knife-cutters wandering through". In response, Wheeler faced calls to resign from Stephen Robertson, the chief executive of the Big Issue Foundation and a representative from a leading national charity which works on behalf of Gypsies, Travellers and Roma described the language as "disgraceful". Wheeler issued an apology for her "inappropriate language", and said it "is not at all representative of the great cultural contribution and rich heritage that the Gypsy, Roma and Traveller communities make to this country".

In June 2022, Wheeler was criticised by Labour for comments made at a lunch in London, in which she described Birmingham and Blackpool as "godawful" places. Wheeler later apologised and said she made an "inappropriate remark that does not reflect my actual view".

== Personal life ==
Wheeler's late husband Bob was a Conservative councillor who was made leader of South Derbyshire District Council in 2010, after his wife stepped down from the role on becoming an MP. He stood down as Leader of the Council in January 2018; he died in late 2018.

Parliament of the United Kingdom
Preceded by Mark Todd	Member of Parliament for South Derbyshire; 2010–2024	Succeeded by Samantha Niblett
Political offices
Preceded by Guy Opperman	Lord Commissioner of the Treasury; 2017–2018	Succeeded by Rebecca Harris
Preceded by Marcus Jones	Parliamentary Under-Secretary of State for Housing and Homelessness; 2018–2019	Succeeded by Luke Hall
Preceded by Mark Field	Parliamentary Under-Secretary of State for Asia and the Pacific; 2019–2020	Succeeded by Nigel Adams
Preceded by Julia Lopez	Parliamentary Secretary for the Cabinet Office; 2022–present	Incumbent
