= Minister of State for Skills =

British minister of state

United Kingdom Minister of State for Skills
- Royal Arms of His Majesty's Government

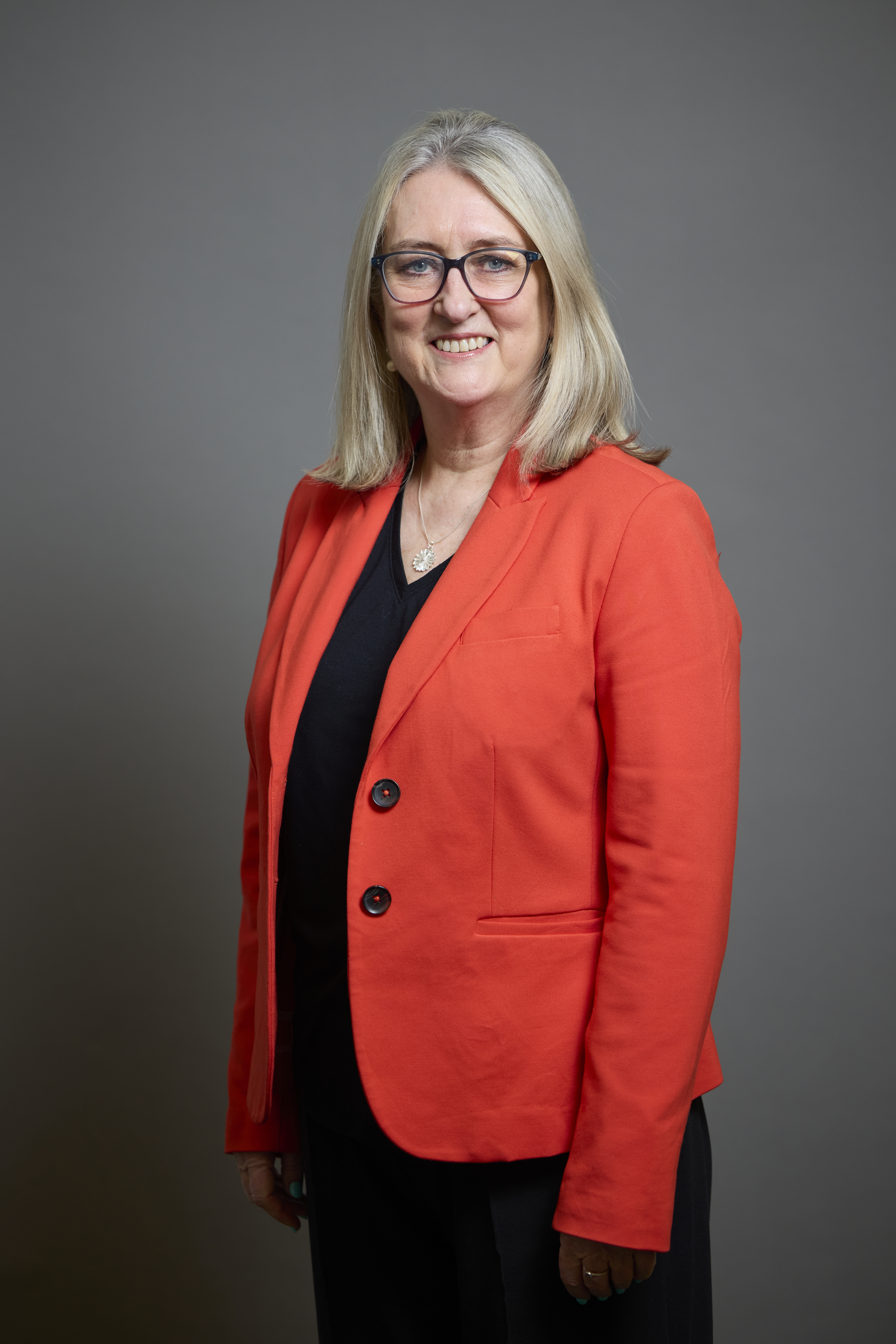
- Incumbent; Jacqui Smith, Baroness Smith of Malvern since 6 July 2024
- Department for Education; Department for Work and Pensions
- Style: Minister
- Nominator: Prime Minister of the United Kingdom
- Appointer: The Monarch; on advice of the Prime Minister
- Formation: 2001 (Second Blair ministry)
- First holder: Margaret Hodge MP
- Website: Minister of State (Minister for Skills)

The minister of state for Skills, formerly Minister of State for Skills, Apprenticeships and Higher Education and previously Minister of State for Universities, is a mid-level position in the Department for Education in the British government. The position has been filled by Jacqui Smith since July 2024. The minister has oversight over skills and higher and further education, including universities and the Student Loans Company.

Under New Labour, the role was known as Minister of State for Higher Education and Minister of State for Innovation, Universities and Skills.

Under the Cameron–Clegg coalition and May ministries, the role became known as Minister of State for Universities, Science and Cities and Minister of State for Universities, Science, Research and Innovation. The role of Parliamentary Under-Secretary of State for Science, Research and Innovation was created out of this office.

Following the 2021 British cabinet reshuffle under the second Johnson ministry, the role was known as Minister of State for Higher and Further Education and the officeholder, Michelle Donelan, was given the right to attend Cabinet. Under Donelan's successor, Andrea Jenkyns, the position was demoted to a Parliamentary Under-Secretary of State role and known as Parliamentary Under-Secretary of State for Skills, Further and Higher Education.

Under the Sunak ministry, the role was promoted back to the level of Minister of State.

At certain times, the minister worked in the Department for Business, Innovation and Skills and the Department for Work and Pensions.

The short form Skills Minister is sometimes used.

== History ==
The position had increased prominence in 2020 and 2021 when the COVID-19 pandemic affected further education and university education. The minister attended cabinet briefly after the 2021 British cabinet reshuffle.

== Responsibilities ==
The minister has the following responsibilities:

- Skills England
- Technical qualifications, including T Levels
- Higher technical education (levels 4 and 5)
- Adult education, including basic skills and combined authority devolution
- Careers advice and support for young people not in employment, education or training (NEETs) (including the Careers and Enterprise Company)
- Apprenticeships, including the growth and skills levy
- Technical Excellence Colleges
- Local skills improvement plans
- Governance, intervention and accountability of further education colleges
- Funding for education and training, provision and outcomes for 16- to 19-year-olds
- Further education funding, financial stability and workforce
- Access to higher education, participation and lifelong learning
- Quality of higher education and the student experience (including the Office for Students)
- Student finance (including the Student Loans Company)
- International education

== List of ministers of state for higher and further education ==
Name	Portrait	Took office	Left office	Political party	Prime Minister
Role created out of the Department for Education and Skills
Minister of State for Universities
Margaret Hodge MP for Barking		11 June 2001	13 June 2003	Labour	Tony Blair (ll)
Minister of State for Higher Education
Alan Johnson MP for Kingston upon Hull West and Hessle		13 June 2003	8 September 2004	Labour	Tony Blair (ll)
Kim Howells MP for Pontypridd		10 September 2004	11 May 2005	Labour	Tony Blair (ll)
Bill Rammell MP for Harlow		11 May 2005	5 October 2008	Labour	Tony Blair (lll) Gordon Brown (l)
Minister of State for Higher Education and Intellectual Property
David Lammy MP for Tottenham		28 June 2007	11 May 2010	Labour	Gordon Brown (l)
Minister of State for Universities and Science
David Willetts MP for Havant		11 May 2010	14 July 2014	Conservative	David Cameron (Coalition)
Minister of State for Universities, Science and Cities
Greg Clark MP for Royal Tunbridge Wells		15 July 2014	11 May 2015	Conservative	David Cameron (Coalition)
Minister of State for Universities, Science, Research and Innovation
Jo Johnson MP for Orpington		11 May 2015	9 January 2018	Conservative	David Cameron (II) Theresa May (I) + (II)
Sam Gyimah MP for East Surrey		9 January 2018	30 November 2018	Conservative	Theresa May (II)
Chris Skidmore MP for Kingswood		5 December 2018	24 July 2019	Conservative	Theresa May (II)
Jo Johnson MP for Orpington		24 July 2019	5 September 2019	Conservative	Boris Johnson (l)
Chris Skidmore MP for Kingswood		10 September 2019	13 February 2020	Conservative	Boris Johnson (l) + (ll)
Minister of State for Universities Feb 2020 to Sept 2021 Minister of State for Higher and Further Education Sept 2021 to July 2022
Michelle Donelan MP for Chippenham		13 February 2020	5 July 2022	Conservative	Boris Johnson (ll)
Parliamentary Under-Secretary of State for Skills, Further and Higher Education July 2022 to Sept 2022 Parliamentary Under-Secretary of State for Skills Sept to Oct 2022
Andrea Jenkyns MP for Morley and Outwood		9 July 2022	26 October 2022	Conservative	Boris Johnson (ll) Liz Truss (I)
Minister of State for Skills, Apprenticeships and Higher Education
Robert Halfon MP for Harlow		26 October 2022	26 March 2024	Conservative	Rishi Sunak (I)
Luke Hall MP for Thornbury and Yate		26 March 2024	5 July 2024	Conservative	Rishi Sunak (I)
Minister of State for Skills
Jacqui Smith, Baroness Smith of Malvern		6 July 2024	Incumbent	Labour	Keir Starmer (I) Andy Burnham (I)

== See also ==
- Secretary of State for Innovation, Universities and Skills
