= Minister of State for Homelessness and Democracy =

United Kingdom Minister of State for Homelessness and Democracy
- Royal Arms of His Majesty's Government

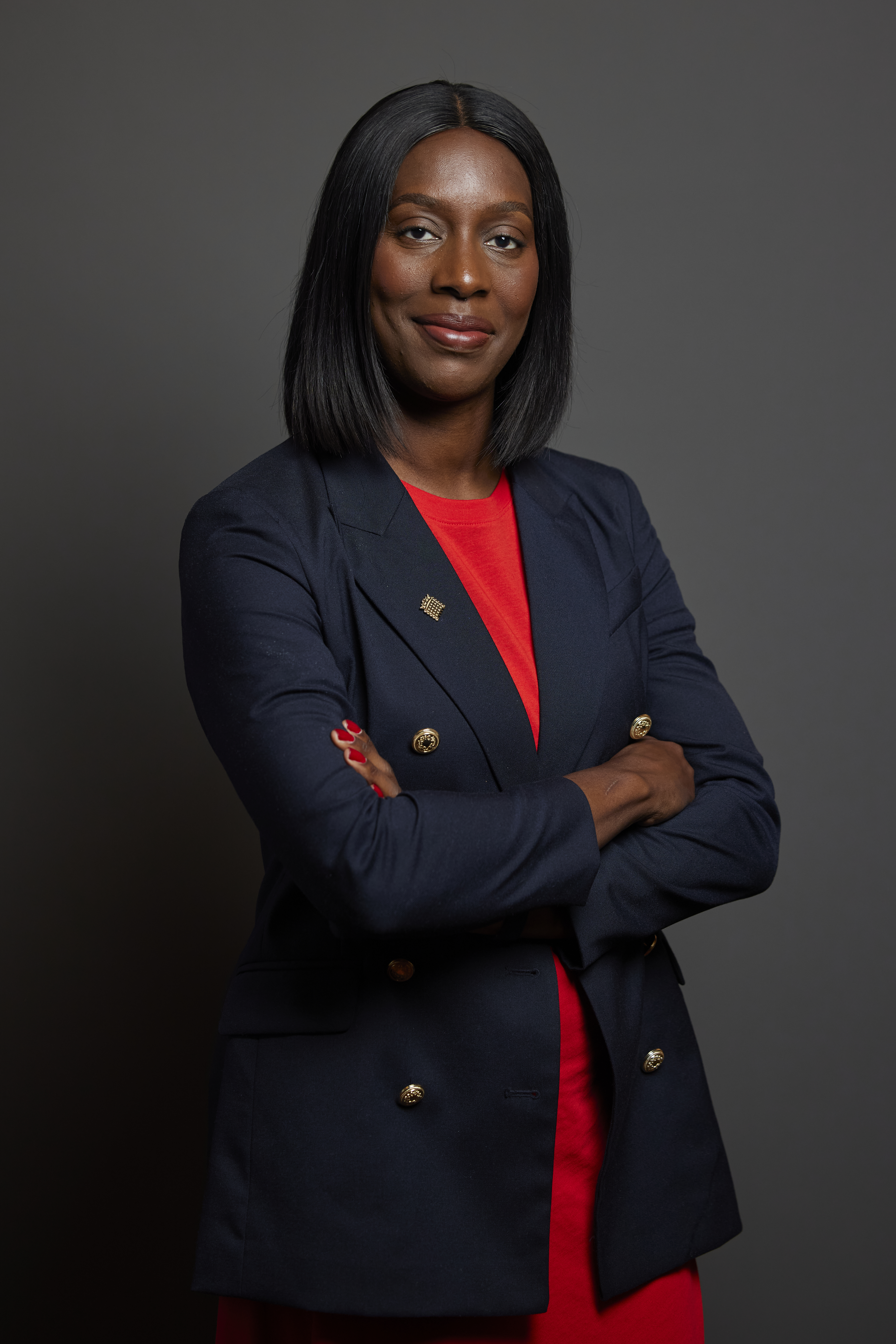
- Incumbent; Florence Eshalomi since 21 July 2026
- Ministry of Housing, Communities and Local Government
- Style: Minister
- Nominator: Prime Minister of the United Kingdom
- Appointer: The Monarch on advice of the Prime Minister
- Term length: At His Majesty's pleasure
- Website: www.gov.uk/government/ministers/minister-of-state--63

The Minister of State for Homelessness and Democracy is a junior position in the Ministry of Housing, Communities and Local Government in the British government.

== Officeholders ==
Name	Portrait	Term of office		Party	Ministry
Parliamentary Under-Secretary of State for Housing and Homelessness
Heather Wheeler		9 January 2018	26 July 2019	Conservative	May II
Nigel Adams (Covering for Wheeler)		22 May 2018	5 November 2018	Conservative	May II
Parliamentary Under-Secretary of State for Rough Sleeping and Housing
Luke Hall		27 July 2019	8 September 2020	Conservative	Johnson I
Kelly Tolhurst		8 September 2020	16 January 2021	Conservative	Johnson II
Parliamentary Under-Secretary of State for Housing and Homelessness
Eddie Hughes		16 January 2021	8 September 2022	Conservative	Johnson II
Andrew Stephenson		20 September 2022	27 October 2022	Conservative	Truss
Felicity Buchan		30 October 2022	5 July 2024	Conservative	Sunak
Parliamentary Under-Secretary of State for Building Safety and Homelessness (until October 2024) Parliamentary Under-Secretary of State for Homelessness and Democracy (from October 2024)
Rushanara Ali		9 July 2024	7 August 2025	Labour	Starmer
Minister of State for Local Government and Homelessness
Alison McGovern		6 September 2025	21 July 2026	Labour	Starmer
Minister of State for Homelessness, Democracy, Communities and Faith
Florence Eshalomi		22 July 2026	Incumbent	Labour Co-op	Burnham

== Shadow Ministers ==
Name	Portrait	Term of office		Party	Shadow Ministry
Sarah Owen		4 December 2021	28 October 2022	Labour	Starmer
Paula Barker		28 October 2022	5 September 2023	Labour	Starmer
Mike Amesbury		5 September 2023	5 July 2024	Labour	Starmer
