= Parliamentary Under-Secretary of State for Local Government (UK) =

British government minister

United Kingdom Parliamentary Under-Secretary of State for Local Government
- Royal Arms of His Majesty's Government

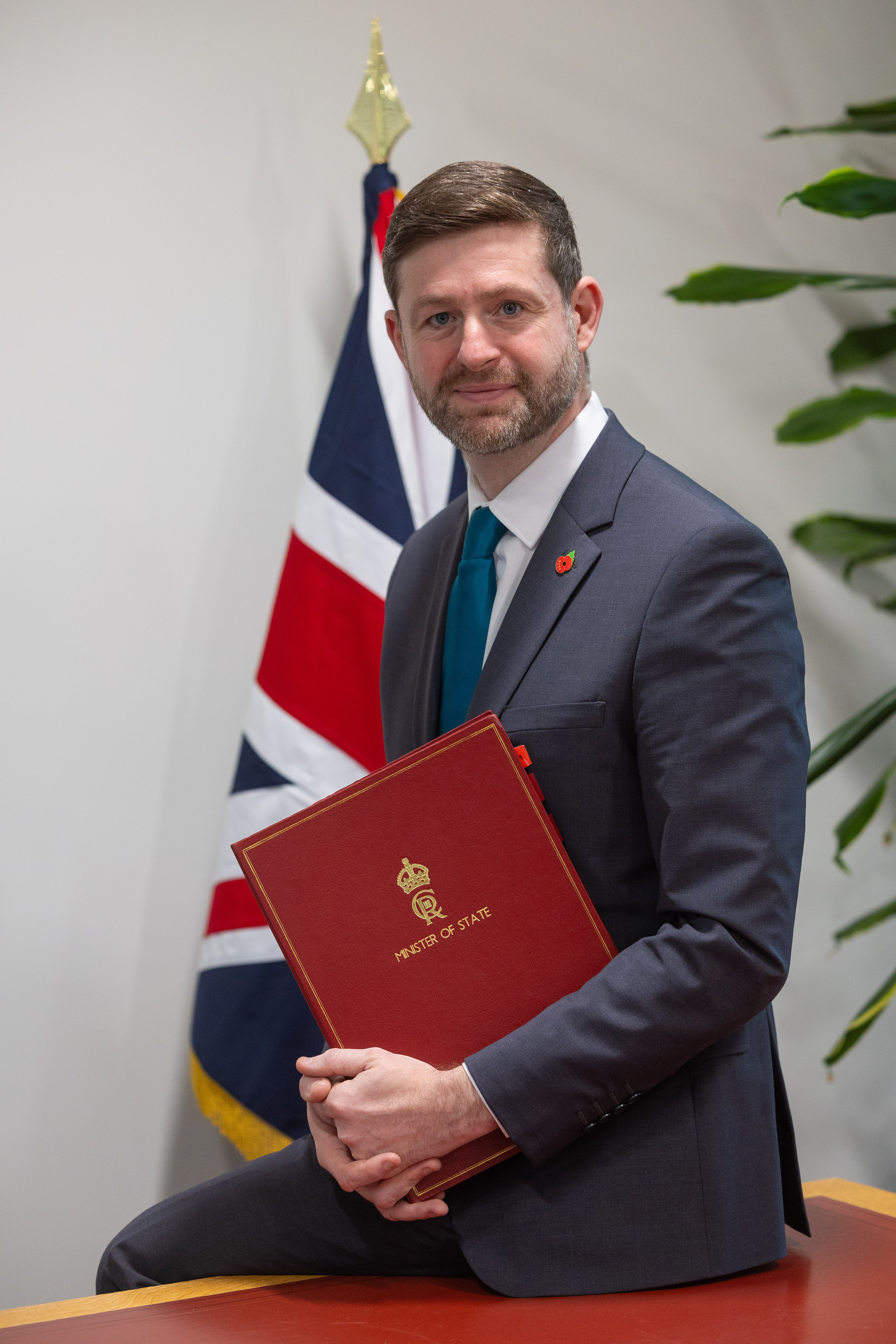
- Incumbent; Jim McMahon since 22 July 2026
- Ministry of Housing, Communities and Local Government
- Style: Minister
- Nominator: Prime Minister
- Appointer: The Monarch; on advice of the Prime Minister
- Term length: At His Majesty's pleasure
- Website: www.gov.uk/government/ministers/parliamentary-under-secretary-of-state--325

The Parliamentary Under-Secretary of State for Local Government is a junior position in the Ministry of Housing, Communities and Local Government in the British government. The position is currently held by Jim McMahon.

== Responsibilities ==
The minister's responsibilities include:

- Local government finance (including local taxation, business rates and local government pensions)
- Local government policy (including stewardship, local audit, and governance reform)
- Local government reorganisation
- Homelessness and rough sleeping
- Supported housing and domestic abuse
- Resettlement
- Planning casework

== Ministers ==
Name	Portrait	Entered office	Left office	Political party	Prime Minister
Minister of State for Local Government
Tom King		6 May 1979	6 January 1983	Conservative	Thatcher
Irwin Bellow, Baron Bellwin		6 January 1983	11 September 1984	Conservative	Thatcher
Kenneth Baker		11 September 1984	2 September 1985	Conservative	Thatcher
William Waldegrave		2 September 1985	10 September 1986	Conservative	Thatcher
Rhodes Boyson		10 September 1986	13 June 1987	Conservative	Thatcher
Michael Howard		13 June 1987	25 July 1988	Conservative	Thatcher
John Gummer		25 July 1988	25 July 1989	Conservative	Thatcher
David Hunt		25 July 1989	4 May 1990	Conservative	Thatcher
Michael Portillo		4 May 1990	14 April 1992	Conservative	Major
John Redwood		15 April 1992	27 May 1993	Conservative	Major
David Curry		27 May 1993	2 May 1997	Conservative	Major
Hilary Armstrong		2 May 1997	8 June 2001	Labour	Blair
Minister of State for Local and Regional Government
Nick Raynsford		11 June 2001	10 May 2005	Labour	Blair
Minister of State for Local Government
Phil Woolas		10 May 2005	28 June 2007	Labour	Blair
John Healey		28 June 2007	5 June 2009	Labour	Brown
Rosie Winterton		5 June 2009	11 May 2010	Labour	Brown
Parliamentary Under Secretary of State for Communities and Local Government
Andrew Stunell		13 May 2010	4 September 2012	Liberal Democrats	Cameron
Don Foster		4 September 2012	7 October 2013	Liberal Democrats	Cameron
Stephen Williams		7 October 2013	8 May 2015	Liberal Democrats	Cameron
Parliamentary Under-Secretary of State for Local Government
Marcus Jones		8 May 2015	8 January 2018	Conservative	Cameron
Marcus Jones		8 May 2015	8 January 2018	Conservative	May
Rishi Sunak		9 January 2018	24 July 2019	Conservative	May
Minister of State for the Northern Powerhouse and Local Growth
Jake Berry		24 July 2019 (Note: Berry previously served as Parliamentary Under-Secretary of State from 14 June 2017 to 24 July 2019.)	13 February 2020	Conservative	Johnson
Minister of State for Regional Growth and Local Government
Simon Clarke		13 February 2020	8 September 2020	Conservative	Johnson
Luke Hall		8 September 2020	15 September 2021	Conservative	Johnson
Minister of State for Local Government, Faith and Communities
Kemi Badenoch		16 September 2021	6 July 2022	Conservative	Johnson
Minister of State for Local Government and Building Safety
Paul Scully		8 July 2022	27 October 2022	Conservative	Johnson
Paul Scully		8 July 2022	27 October 2022	Conservative	Truss
Parliamentary Under-Secretary of State for Local Government and Building Safety
Lee Rowley		27 October 2022	13 November 2023	Conservative	Sunak
Parliamentary Under-Secretary of State for Local Government
Simon Hoare		13 November 2023	5 July 2024	Conservative	Sunak
Minister of State for Local Government and English Devolution
Jim McMahon		6 July 2024	6 September 2025	Labour Co-op	Starmer
Minister of State for Local Government and Homelessness
Alison McGovern		6 September 2025	21 July 2026	Labour	Starmer
Parliamentary Under-Secretary of State for Local Government, Devolution and Regional Growth
Jim McMahon		22 July 2026	Incumbent	Labour Co-op	Burnham
