= Kelly Tolhurst =

British politician (born 1978)

The Right Honourable Kelly Tolhurst
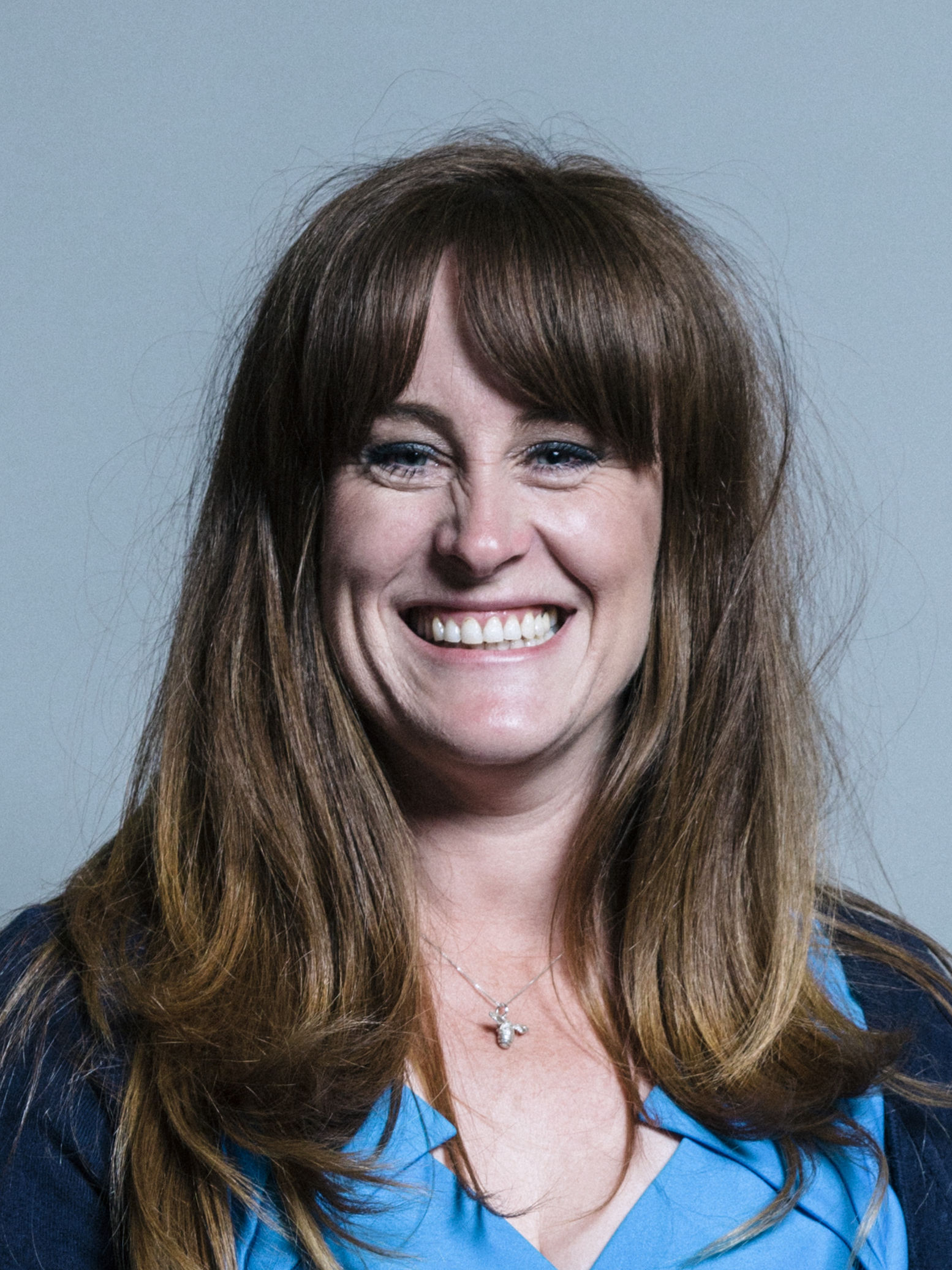
- Official portrait, 2017

Minister of State for Schools and Childhood
- In office 7 September 2022 – 28 October 2022
- Prime Minister: Liz Truss; Rishi Sunak
- Preceded by: Brendan Clarke-Smith
- Succeeded by: Claire Coutinho

Government Deputy Chief Whip Treasurer of the Household
- In office 1 July 2022 – 7 September 2022
- Prime Minister: Boris Johnson
- Preceded by: Chris Pincher
- Succeeded by: Craig Whittaker

Parliamentary Under-Secretary of State for Rough Sleeping and Housing
- In office 8 September 2020 – 16 January 2021
- Prime Minister: Boris Johnson
- Preceded by: Luke Hall
- Succeeded by: Eddie Hughes

Parliamentary Under-Secretary of State for Aviation and Maritime
- In office 13 February 2020 – 8 September 2020
- Prime Minister: Boris Johnson
- Preceded by: Nus Ghani
- Succeeded by: Robert Courts

Parliamentary Under-Secretary of State for Small Business, Consumers and Corporate Responsibility
- In office 19 July 2018 – 13 February 2020
- Prime Minister: Theresa May; Boris Johnson
- Preceded by: Andrew Griffiths
- Succeeded by: Paul Scully

Member of Parliament for Rochester and Strood
- In office 7 May 2015 – 30 May 2024
- Preceded by: Mark Reckless
- Succeeded by: Lauren Edwards

Member of Medway Council for Rochester West Ward
- In office 5 May 2011 – 12 January 2018
- Preceded by: Mark Reckless
- Succeeded by: Alex Paterson

Personal details
- Born: Kelly Jane Tolhurst; 23 August 1978 (age 47) Rochester, Kent, England
- Party: Conservative
- Website: Campaign website

Kelly Jane Tolhurst (born 23 August 1978) is a British politician who served as the Member of Parliament (MP) for Rochester and Strood from 2015 to 2024. A member of the Conservative Party, she served as Minister of State for Schools and Childhood from September to October 2022.

Tolhurst previously served as Parliamentary Under-Secretary of State for Rough Sleeping and Housing from 2020 to 2021, Parliamentary Under-Secretary of State for Aviation and Maritime in 2020 and Parliamentary Under-Secretary of State for Small Business, Consumers and Corporate Responsibility from 2018 to 2020 and was briefly Deputy Chief Whip in 2022. She is a former councillor for the Rochester West ward on Medway Council.

== Early life ==
Tolhurst was born in Rochester, where her father Morris Tolhurst was a boat builder. She attended Wainscott Primary School in Rochester and Chapter School in Strood, a non-selective state school for girls aged 11 to 18. From 2008, she ran a marine survey business, called Tolhurst Associates, with her father, with employment in marketing previous to this point.

== Political career ==
Tolhurst was elected to the Rochester West ward on Medway Council in 2011 and served as a councillor until 2018 when she resigned after being appointed as an assistant whip. In the by-election for the ward that followed in March 2018, the seat was taken by the Labour candidate Alex Paterson. Tolhurst was selected to contest the 2014 Rochester and Strood by-election which was triggered by the defection of Mark Reckless to UKIP. Tolhurst lost the by-election, held on 20 November 2014, but regained the seat for the Conservatives at the 2015 general election six months later, securing a majority of over 7,000. She was re-elected in 2017.

Tolhurst served on the Business, Energy and Industrial Strategy Committee, the European Scrutiny Committee and the Business, Innovation and Skills Committee. She was made an assistant government whip during the reshuffle on 9 January 2018.

Tolhurst was appointed the Parliamentary Under-Secretary of State for Small Business, Consumers and Labour Markets at the Department for Business, Energy and Industrial Strategy on 19 July 2018.

In February 2020, Tolhurst was appointed as the Parliamentary Under-Secretary of State for Transport at the Department for Transport, succeeding Nus Ghani who had been relieved of ministerial responsibilities.

Tolhurst campaigned to remain in the European Union prior to the 2016 referendum.

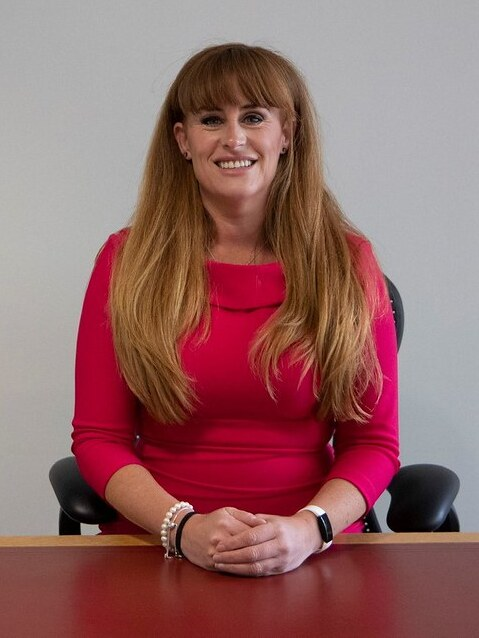
Tolhurst as Parliamentary Under-Secretary of State for Housing and Homelessness

Tolhurst was appointed as the Parliamentary Under-Secretary of State for Local Government and Homelessness at the Ministry of Housing, Communities and Local Government in September 2020, replacing Luke Hall, who had in turn replaced Simon Clarke in a different position in the same department. She resigned from this position in January 2021 after receiving "devastating family news".

On 1 July 2022, Tolhurst was appointed Government Deputy Chief Whip and Treasurer of the Household by Prime Minister Boris Johnson, following the resignation of Chris Pincher.

On 7 September 2022, she was appointed Minister of State in the Department for Education.

On 8 March 2023, she was appointed as a member of the Privy Council.

In the 2024 general election, she was unseated by Lauren Edwards from the Labour Party.

== Post-parliamentary career ==
Following her defeat at the 2024 UK General Election, Tolhurst was appointed as Director at Skippers Line Marine Coatings UK.

Parliament of the United Kingdom
Preceded by Mark Reckless	Member of Parliament for Rochester and Strood; 2015–2024	Succeeded by Lauren Edwards
Political offices
Preceded by Andrew Griffiths	Parliamentary Under-Secretary of State for Business, Energy and Industrial Strategy; 2018–2020	Succeeded by Paul Scully
Preceded by Nus Ghani	Parliamentary Under-Secretary of State for Transport; 2020	Succeeded by Robert Courts
Preceded by Luke Hall	Parliamentary Under-Secretary of State for Rough Sleeping and Housing; 2020–2021	Succeeded by Eddie Hughes
Party political offices
Preceded by Chris Pincher	Conservative Deputy Chief Whip in the House of Commons; 2022	Succeeded by Craig Whittaker
