= United Kingdom cabinet committee =

Group of senior government ministers led by the Prime Minister

The British government is directed by the Cabinet, a group of senior government ministers led by the Prime Minister. Most of the day-to-day work of the Cabinet is carried out by Cabinet committees, rather than by the full Cabinet. Each committee has its own area of responsibility, and their decisions are binding on the entire Cabinet.

The details of the committee structure and membership are at the discretion of the Prime Minister. The Prime Minister is free to reorganize committees, assign responsibilities, and can appoint or dismiss committee members freely. The sole limitation is the requirement that Cabinet ministers must be sworn members of the Privy Council, since the Cabinet itself is a committee of the Privy Council.

Although there have been many changes since the Cabinet committee system was first developed in the early twentieth century, the committees for foreign and military policy, domestic policy, economic policy, and the government's legislative agenda have been more or less permanent fixtures. These and many other committees are standing committees, which have a broad remit; others are ad hoc committees, which are established to deal with specific matters. Ad hoc committees are rarer now than throughout most of the twentieth century. Many matters are now expected to be resolved bilaterally between departments, or through more informal discussion, rather than requiring the formation of a committee.

The 2015 government introduced "Implementation Taskforces" to address specific cross-cutting priorities. These are to report to the Prime Minister and Cabinet, and Cabinet approval is still required if collective agreement is needed.

When the Prime Minister is unable to attend Cabinet or the chair and any deputy chair of a Cabinet committee are absent, the next most senior minister in the ministerial ranking should take the chair.

== Committee procedure ==
Committee membership is limited to ministers, but non-ministers may attend in some cases. In particular, the National Security Council is routinely attended by senior military, intelligence and security officials. Members of the Prime Minister's office – including the Prime Minister themselves – may attend any committee. The Prime Minister's attendance does not mean that they will chair the committee, despite being the most senior Cabinet member present, though they may choose to do so.

In the 2010 coalition government, each Cabinet committee included members of both the Conservative Party and the Liberal Democrats. Furthermore, the general pattern was for committees to have a chair and a deputy chair, one from each party. There was a Coalition Committee, and an operational working group, to handle appeals over coalition disputes and to plan future policy.

Former committees with non-ministers as full members include the Economic Advisory Council, whose membership was made up of a combination of ministers and experts in economics. The Committee of Imperial Defence, a parallel Cabinet for military policy which existed from 1904 until 1939, included ministers, heads of the armed services, and civil servants. Between 1997 and 2001, there was a Ministerial Consultative Committee with the Liberal Democratic Party which included senior Liberal Democrats as well as Labour ministers.

Until 1992, the list of cabinet committees, their membership, and their terms of reference were secret, with rare exceptions. During the Second World War, details of the War Cabinet structure were communicated to Parliament; Winston Churchill had previously announced a Standing Committee on National Expenditure in his 1925 Budget statement. The existence and membership of the Defence and Overseas Policy Committee was announced in 1963, coinciding with the amalgamation of the service ministries into a single Ministry of Defence. Margaret Thatcher confirmed the continuing existence of this committee in the House of Commons in 1979, along with standing committees for Economic Strategy, Home and Social Affairs, and Legislation. The secrecy was due to the concern that public knowledge of Cabinet procedure would lead to a loss of faith in collective responsibility (if it became known that only a subset of the Cabinet had been involved in making a given decision) and undue pressure being put on committee chairs once their specific policy responsibilities became known. Whether decisions were made by the entire Cabinet, or by a committee, is not revealed at present.

Cabinet committees are shadowed by "official committees" made up of civil servants from the relevant departments. Official committees follow a thirty-year secrecy rule with respect to their existence and membership.

=== Committees with special functions ===
Most committees exist for the coordination of policy in some specific area. Some committees, however, have a special role in managing government business, and accordingly have different procedures.

The Public Expenditure Committee (PEX) plays a central role in the allocation of government money to departments. It originated in 1981 under the informal title of "Star Chamber" as an ad hoc committee (MISC 62) which could handle appeals over spending disputes, rather than having these be dealt with by the full Cabinet. An appeal to Cabinet was still possible, but this right was rarely exercised. The original name refers to the Star Chamber court noted for its secret, arbitrary and brutal decisions. The committee was made permanent under John Major, under the name "EDX", and placed under the chairmanship of the Chancellor of the Exchequer. From 1998 to 2010 the same committee (by then called "PX", and later "PSX") also monitored departments' fulfillment of Public service agreements. While such agreements are no longer used, the committee retains its role in examining departmental expenditure, and will advise Cabinet on the allocation each department is to receive.

The Legislation committee allocates time for government bills to be considered in Parliament, coordinates the writing and handling of these bills in general, and is responsible for the Queen's Speech. Previously, there had been two committees, one for considering future legislation and another to deal with bills during their passage through Parliament. Departments who wish to make new primary legislation must apply to the committee for a slot in the legislative programme, as well as obtaining clearance from the relevant policy committee.

In an emergency, the National Security Council (Threats, Hazards, Resilience and Contingencies) subcommittee can meet in an operational configuration. This arrangement was previously named as the Civil Contingencies Committee. In this case, the chair is taken by the minister for whichever government department is the "lead" for the emergency in question. That subcommittee however has disestablished as of 2021.

=== Ad hoc committees ===
During the post-Second World War period, in addition to standing committees, there were ad hoc committees that were convened to handle a single issue. These were normally short-lived. Each was given a prefix of Gen or Misc and a number. Gen 183, for example, was the Committee on Subversive Activities. Between 1945 and 1964, Gen (for general) committees were sequentially numbered from 1 to 881 in order of formation.

=== Cabinet papers ===
Committee minutes and papers follow the same secrecy rules as for the full Cabinet. Documents are generally handled on a need-to-know basis, and so may not be available to ministers who do not serve on the relevant committee. Some materials may be classified as being available exclusively to the named members of the committee, and particularly sensitive papers may be kept in a secure room and read only under supervision. Papers may be distributed physically or electronically (via the Government Secure Intranet). Notes taken at meetings for the purpose of preparing the official minutes are destroyed once the minutes have been written. The minutes do not generally link points made in discussion to the specific people who made them.

Future governments may not be permitted to see the cabinet papers of their predecessors, if there has been a change of party. Access in this case requires the approval of the former Prime Minister, or of the Leader of the Opposition. The few exceptions relate to papers of an expressly non-political nature, such as legal advice or international agreements. Retired ministers wishing to write their memoirs are given access to papers from their tenure, but are usually not allowed to borrow them from the Cabinet Office archive.

== Current committees ==
Name	Chair	Deputy Chair	Terms of reference
National Economic Council	Andy Burnham		To consider matters relating to good growth, living standards and the economy.
National Security Council	Andy Burnham		To consider matters relating to defence, national security, foreign policy and resilience.
National Security Council (Nuclear) (Note: Sub-committee of the National Security Council)	Andy Burnham		To consider matters around nuclear deterrence and nuclear security.
National Security Council (Resilience) (Note: Sub-committee of the National Security Council)	Louise Haigh		To oversee implementation and delivery of national resilience matters.
Europe	Andy Burnham	Ed Miliband	To consider matters relating to European affairs.
Domestic Affairs	Andy Burnham		To consider matters relating to domestic affairs, including the implementation and delivery of domestic policy.
Legislation	Alan Campbell		To consider matters relating to primary legislation.

This table follows the document issued by the Cabinet Office in September 2026.

The membership of the current cabinet committees in below.

=== National Economic Council ===
Portrait	Member	Office(s)
	Andy Burnham (Chair)	Prime Minister; First Lord of the Treasury; Minister for the Civil Service; Minister for the Union
	Louise Haigh	First Secretary of State; Chancellor of the Duchy of Lancaster; Minister for the Cabinet Office
	John Healey	Chancellor of the Exchequer; Second Lord of the Treasury

=== National Security Council ===
Portrait	Member	Office(s)
	Andy Burnham (Chair)	Prime Minister; First Lord of the Treasury; Minister for the Civil Service; Minister for the Union
	Louise Haigh	First Secretary of State; Chancellor of the Duchy of Lancaster; Minister for the Cabinet Office
	John Healey	Chancellor of the Exchequer; Second Lord of the Treasury
	Ed Miliband	Secretary of State for Foreign, Commonwealth and Development Affairs
	Shabana Mahmood	Secretary of State for the Home Department
	Wes Streeting	Secretary of State for Defence
	Ellie Reeves	Attorney General for England and Wales; Advocate General for Northern Ireland
	Dan Jarvis	Minister of State for Security

=== National Security Council (Nuclear) ===
Portrait	Member	Office(s)
	Andy Burnham (Chair)	Prime Minister; First Lord of the Treasury; Minister for the Civil Service; Minister for the Union
	Louise Haigh	First Secretary of State; Chancellor of the Duchy of Lancaster; Minister for the Cabinet Office
	John Healey	Chancellor of the Exchequer; Second Lord of the Treasury
	Ed Miliband	Secretary of State for Foreign, Commonwealth and Development Affairs
	Shabana Mahmood	Secretary of State for the Home Department
	Wes Streeting	Secretary of State for Defence
	Miatta Fahnbulleh	Secretary of State for Energy Security and Net Zero

=== National Security Council (Resilience) ===
Portrait	Member	Office(s)
	Louise Haigh (Chair)	First Secretary of State; Chancellor of the Duchy of Lancaster; Minister for the Cabinet Office
	John Healey	Chancellor of the Exchequer; Second Lord of the Treasury
	Shabana Mahmood	Secretary of State for the Home Department
	Wes Streeting	Secretary of State for Defence
	Jonathan Reynolds	Secretary of State for Business, Innovation, Science and Trade
	Yvette Cooper	Secretary of State for Health and Social Care
	Angela Rayner	Secretary of State for Housing, Communities and Local Government
	Miatta Fahnbulleh	Secretary of State for Energy Security and Net Zero
	Lisa Nandy	Secretary of State for Digital, Culture, Media and Sport
	Angela Eagle	Secretary of State for Environment, Food and Rural Affairs
	Dan Jarvis	Minister of State for Security

=== Europe ===
Portrait	Member	Office(s)
	Andy Burnham (Chair)	Prime Minister; First Lord of the Treasury; Minister for the Civil Service; Minister for the Union
	Louise Haigh	First Secretary of State; Chancellor of the Duchy of Lancaster; Minister for the Cabinet Office
	John Healey	Chancellor of the Exchequer; Second Lord of the Treasury
	Ed Miliband (Deputy Chair)	Secretary of State for Foreign, Commonwealth and Development Affairs
	Chris Bryant	Secretary of State for Northern Ireland
	Ellie Reeves	Attorney General for England and Wales; Advocate General for Northern Ireland
	Hamish Falconer	Minister for Intergovernmental Relations and European Relations

=== Domestic Affairs ===
Portrait	Member	Office(s)
	Louise Haigh (Chair)	First Secretary of State; Chancellor of the Duchy of Lancaster; Minister for the Cabinet Office
	John Healey	Chancellor of the Exchequer; Second Lord of the Treasury
	Shabana Mahmood	Secretary of State for the Home Department
	Bridget Phillipson	Minister for Women and Equalities
	Hamish Falconer	Minister for Intergovernmental Relations and European Relations

=== Legislation ===
Portrait	Member	Office(s)
	Alan Campbell (Chair)	Lord President of the Council; Leader of the House of Commons
	Chris Bryant	Secretary of State for Northern Ireland
	Douglas Alexander	Secretary of State for Scotland
	Stephen Kinnock	Secretary of State for Wales
	Anneliese Midgley	Parliamentary Secretary to the Treasury (Chief Whip)
	Angela Smith, Baroness Smith of Basildon	Lord Privy Seal; Leader of the House of Lords
	Emma Reynolds	Chief Secretary to the Treasury
	Ellie Reeves	Attorney General for England and Wales; Advocate General for Northern Ireland
	Hamish Falconer	Minister for Intergovernmental Relations and European Relations
	Roy Kennedy, Baron Kennedy of Southwark	Lords Chief Whip (Captain of the Honourable Corps of Gentlemen-at-Arms)
	Catherine Smith, Baroness Smith of Cluny	Advocate General for Scotland

=== Mission boards ===
In addition to cabinet committees there are five Mission Boards on growth, clean energy, safer streets, opportunities and health. The Mission Boards are chaired by the respective lead Secretaries of State with a remit to oversee the relevant mission.

=== Non-Cabinet committees ===
There are several committees for which the Cabinet Office is administratively responsible, but which are not Cabinet committees. These include the various 'official' committees, which mostly shadow the Cabinet committees but with civil servants rather than ministers as members. Some others are:

- The Joint Intelligence Committee is an official committee that directs and oversees the UK intelligence and security agencies.
- The Prime Minister and Heads of Devolved Governments Council consists of the leaders of the UK and devolved administrations. Its secretariat is provided by the Cabinet Office but it is not a Cabinet committee.
- The Permanent Secretaries Management Group and Civil Service Steering Board are committees of the senior civil service, housed within the Cabinet Office.

== Historical statistics ==
An approximate count of committees up to and during the Second World War was given by Wilson as follows.

Period	Parent body	Number of committees	Aggregate number of meetings
1917–1922	Cabinet	160	990
1917–1922	Committee of Imperial Defence	11	120
1923-September 1939	Cabinet	379	1,990
1923-September 1939	Committee of Imperial Defence	275	3,400
1923-September 1939	Committee on Civil Research and Economic Advisory Council	70	900
September 1939-July 1945	War Cabinet	292	5,440
September 1939-July 1945	Chiefs of Staff	45	3,050
September 1939-July 1945	Ad hoc committees	90	210

This excludes committees which did not have at least one meeting (several of these existed solely as a means for documents to be circulated among the members). The 1939-45 figures do not include the Joint Intelligence Committee, Joint Planning Staff, or the Combined Chiefs of Staff.

=== Former non-Cabinet committees ===
- In the first years of the 2010 coalition government, the Coalition Operation and Strategic Planning Group (described as a "working group", rather than a full committee) was to "consider and resolve issues relating to the operation of the coalition agreement, the longer term strategic planning of Government Business and to report as necessary to the Coalition Committee". Its functions were later taken over by the 'Quad' meetings attended by David Cameron, Nick Clegg, George Osborne, and Danny Alexander, with support from political aides and civil servants.
- The Joint Ministerial Committee was formed in 1999 consisted of ministers and officials from the UK and devolved administrations. It was superseded by Prime Minister and Heads of Devolved Governments Council in November 2022.

== See also ==
- Cabinet Office
- Lord President's Committee
- Gen 75 Committee
