= Cabinet of the United Kingdom =

Senior decision-making body of the UK government

Cabinet of the United Kingdom of Great Britain and Northern Ireland
- Royal Arms of His Majesty's Government
- Purpose: Senior decision-making body of the UK government chaired by the Prime Minister
- Location: Cabinet Room, 10 Downing Street, London
- Chairman: Andy Burnham
- Membership: 28 members: 23 Cabinet ministers; 5 ministers attending Cabinet
- Website: gov.uk/cabinet-office

The Cabinet of the United Kingdom is the senior decision-making body of the Government of the United Kingdom. Formally a committee of the Privy Council, it is chaired by the current prime minister as leader of the UK's executive government and the monarch's most senior adviser. Its 28 members are secretaries of state and other senior ministers of state of the UK. The prime minister allocates ministries (or 'portfolios'), and thus determines Cabinet membership, usually after informal consultation with other members of the political party forming government. By convention, Cabinet ministers (and indeed all ministers) are chosen from amongst the current members of the House of Commons and of the House of Lords; they almost always are members of the party with a Commons majority.

The UK's Ministerial Code states that the business of the Cabinet (and its committees) is mainly the determination of major issues of policy, questions of critical importance to the public and questions on which there is an unresolved argument between departments. The cabinet is essentially the peak strategic and political decision-making body of the government. Its members are bound by constitutional and quasi-constitutional conventions and norms, including collective responsibility and cabinet solidarity.

The work of the cabinet is classified; it is supported by the Cabinet Office, the lead department of the civil service. Cabinet ministers (secretaries of state) are questioned in the Houses of Parliament, as part of ongoing scrutiny of government performance. This questioning is often led by the minister's opposite number: the portfolio's shadow minister. Analogously to the cabinet itself, members of the shadow cabinet are chosen, from within the parliamentary ranks of the official opposition, by the leader of the opposition. Shadow cabinet is thus a structure allowing for some pre-election policy development and preparation organised by portfolio; it operates in some ways as the peak body of the nation's primary alternative executive government.

== History ==
Until at least the 16th century, individual officers of state had separate property, powers and responsibilities granted with their separate offices by royal command, and the Crown and the Privy Council constituted the only co-ordinating authorities. In England, phrases such as "cabinet counsel", meaning advice given in private, in a cabinet in the sense of a small room, to the monarch, occur from the late 16th century, and, given the non-standardised spelling of the day, it is often hard to distinguish whether "council" or "counsel" is meant. The OED credits Francis Bacon in his Essays (1605) with the first use of "Cabinet council", where it is described as a foreign habit, of which he disapproves: "For which inconveniences, the doctrine of Italy, and practice of France, in some kings' times, hath introduced cabinet counsels; a remedy worse than the disease". Charles I began a formal "Cabinet Council" from his accession in 1625, as his Privy Council, or "private council", and the first recorded use of "cabinet" by itself for such a body comes from 1644, and is again hostile and associates the term with dubious foreign practices.

There were ministries in England led by the chief minister, which was a personage leading the English government for the monarch. Despite primary accountability to the monarch, these ministries, having a group of ministers running the country, served as a predecessor of the modern perspective of cabinet. After the Union of 1707 between Scotland and England and the ministry of Lord Stanhope and Lord Sunderland collapsed, Sir Robert Walpole rose to power as First Lord of the Treasury. Since the reign of King George I the Cabinet has been the principal executive group of British government. Both he and George II relied heavily on selected groups of advisers, as they were not native English speakers and were less familiar with British politics. The term "minister" came into being since the royal officers "ministered" to the sovereign. The name and institution have been adopted by most English-speaking countries, and the Council of Ministers or similar bodies of other countries are often informally referred to as cabinets.

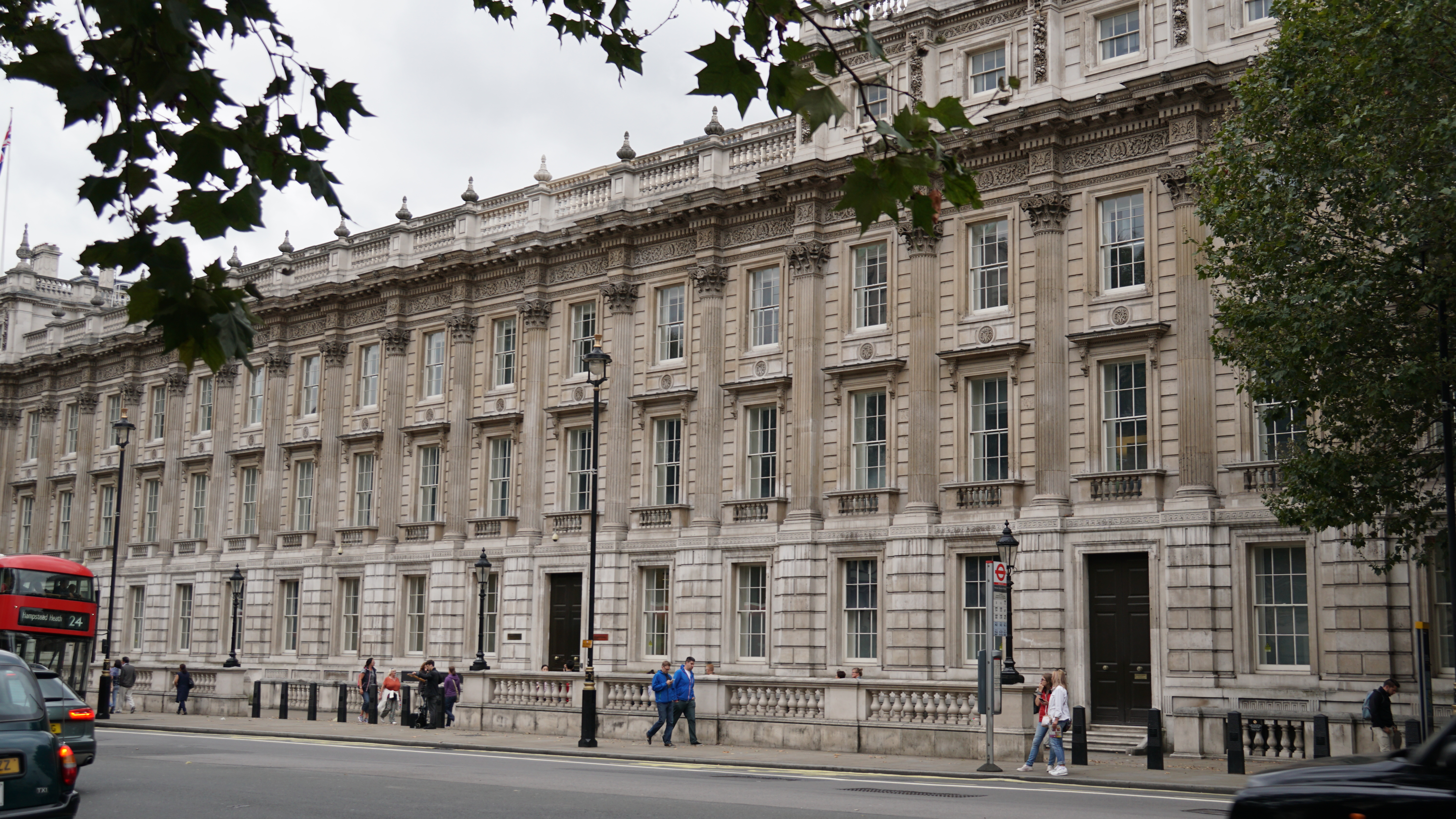
Cabinet Office, London

The modern Cabinet system, including the Cabinet Office, was introduced between 1916 and 1922 under Prime Minister David Lloyd George. A Cabinet secretariat was established in December 1916, and formal minutes and conclusions began to be recorded. Although the Cabinet Manual publicly sets out the principal rules, conventions and procedures governing Cabinet business, the records of individual Cabinet and Cabinet committee proceedings—including agendas, papers, minutes and correspondence—are generally not published contemporaneously.

This development grew out of the exigencies of the First World War, where faster and better co-ordinated decisions across government were seen as a crucial part of the war effort. Decisions on mass conscription, co-ordination worldwide with other governments across international theatres, and armament production tied into a general war strategy that could be developed and overseen from an inner "War Cabinet". The country went through successive crises after the war: the 1926 general strike; the Great Depression of 1929–32; the rise of Bolshevism after 1917 and fascism after 1922; the Spanish Civil War 1936 onwards; the invasion of Abyssinia 1936; the League of Nations Crisis which followed; and the re-armament and resurgence of Germany from 1933, leading into the Second World War.

== Composition ==
The prime minister decides the membership and attendees of the Cabinet.

The total number of Cabinet ministers who are entitled to a salary is capped by statute at 21, plus the Lord Chancellor, who is paid separately. Some ministers may be designated as also attending Cabinet, such as the Attorney General as "it has been considered more appropriate, in recent times at any rate, that the independence and detachment of his office should not be blurred by his inclusion in a political body – that is to say the Cabinet – which may have to make policy decisions upon the basis of the legal advice the law officers have given."

The Cabinet is a committee of the Privy Council (though this interpretation has been challenged) and, as such, all Cabinet ministers must be privy counsellors.

Members of the Cabinet are by convention chosen from members of the two houses of Parliament, as convention dictates that ministers may only be recruited from the House of Commons or the House of Lords, although this convention has been broken in the past for short periods. Patrick Gordon Walker is perhaps the most notable exception: he was appointed to the Cabinet despite losing his seat in the 1964 general election, and resigned from Cabinet after running and losing in a by-election in January 1965. Sometimes, when a minister from neither House is appointed, they have been granted a customary peerage. The Cabinet is now made up almost entirely of members of the House of Commons.

Civil servants from the Cabinet Secretariat and special advisers (on the approval of the prime minister) can also attend Cabinet meetings, but neither take part in discussions.

It has been suggested that the modern Cabinet is too large, including by former Cabinet Secretary Mark Sedwill and scholars Robert Hazell and Rodney Brazier. Hazell has suggested merging the offices of Secretary of State for Northern Ireland, Scotland, and Wales into one Secretary of State for the Union, in a department into which Rodney Brazier has suggested adding a minister of state for England with responsibility for English local government.

== Meetings of the Cabinet ==
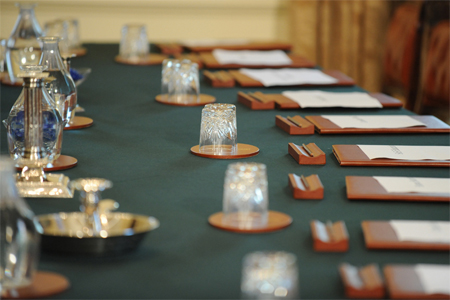
The Cabinet table

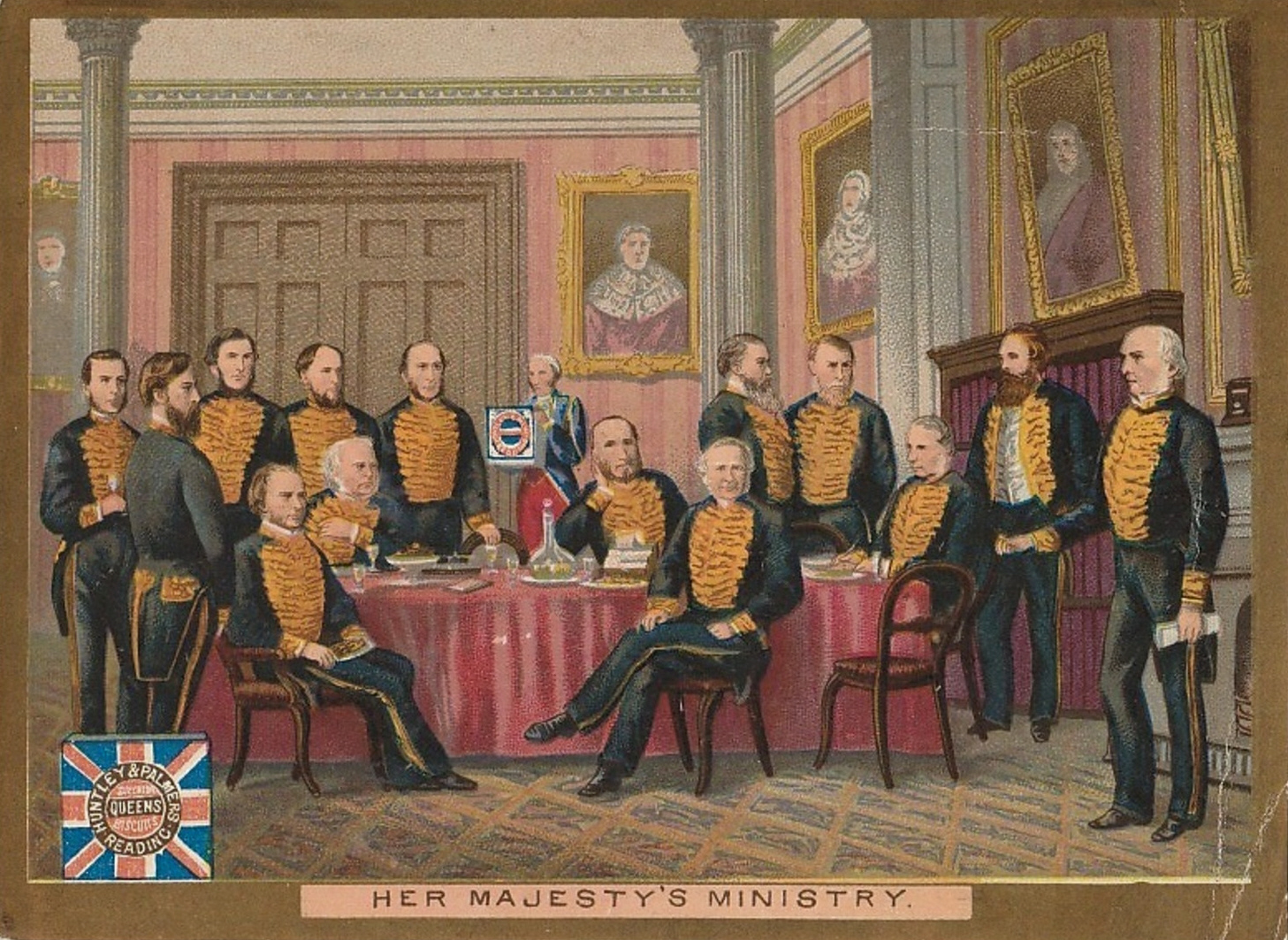
Her Majesty's Cabinet on a 19th-century trade card

Most cabinet meetings take place in the Cabinet Room of 10 Downing Street; however, they have been known to take place in other places.

Despite the custom of meeting on a Thursday, after the appointment of Gordon Brown, the meeting day was switched to Tuesday. However, when David Cameron became prime minister, he held his cabinet meetings on Thursdays again. Under Theresa May, cabinet meetings returned to Tuesday.

The structure and length of meetings varies according to the style of the prime minister and political conditions. Modern meetings can be as short as 30 minutes.

All ministers, including those who do not themselves sit in the cabinet (eg, more junior ministers), are bound by the constitutional convention of collective ministerial responsibility, which is sometimes called Cabinet solidarity. This convention requires cabinet members (and, by extension, members of the government more broadly: ministers) not to speak publicly against decisions taken by cabinet, even if they have—during the cabinet meeting or before it—been opposed to the substance of the decision made.

== Importance ==
Cabinet ministers, like all ministers, are appointed and may be dismissed by the monarch without notice or reason, generally on the advice of the prime minister. The allocation and transfer of responsibilities between ministers and departments is also generally at the prime minister's discretion. The Cabinet has always been led by the prime minister, whose originally unpaid office as such is traditionally described as merely primus inter pares (first among equals), but today the prime minister is the preeminent head of government, with the effective power to appoint and dismiss Cabinet ministers and to control the Cabinet's agenda. The extent to which the Government is collegial varies with political conditions and individual personalities.

The Cabinet is the ultimate decision-making body of the executive within the Westminster system of government in traditional constitutional theory. This interpretation was originally put across in the work of 19th-century constitutionalists such as Walter Bagehot, who described the Cabinet as the "efficient secret" of the British political system in his book The English Constitution. The political and decision-making authority of the cabinet has been gradually reduced over recent decades, with some claiming its role has been usurped by a "prime ministerial" government. In the modern political era, the prime minister releases information concerning the ministerial ranking in the form of a list detailing the seniority of all Cabinet ministers.

The Institute for Government claims that the reduced number of full Cabinet meetings signifies "that the role of Cabinet as a formal decision-making body has been in decline since the war." This view has been contradicted by Vernon Bogdanor, a British constitutional expert, who claims that "the Cabinet has, in fact, been strengthened by the decline in full meetings, as it allows more matters to be transferred to cabinet committees. Thus, business is done more efficiently."

Most prime ministers have had a so-called "kitchen cabinet" consisting of their own trusted advisers who may be Cabinet members but are often non-cabinet trusted personal advisers on their own staff. In recent governments, generally from Margaret Thatcher, and especially in that of Tony Blair, it has been reported that many or even all major decisions have been made before cabinet meetings. This suggestion has been made by former ministers including Clare Short and Chris Smith, in the media, and was made clear in the Butler Review, where Blair's style of "sofa government" was censured.

The combined effect of the prime minister's ability to control Cabinet by circumventing effective discussion in Cabinet and the executive's ability to dominate parliamentary proceedings places the British prime minister in a position of great power, that has been likened to an elective dictatorship (a phrase coined by Quintin Hogg, Baron Hailsham of St Marylebone in 1976). The relative inability of Parliament to hold the Government of the day to account is often cited by the UK media as a justification for the vigour with which they question and challenge the Government.

The classic view of Cabinet Government was laid out by Walter Bagehot in The English Constitution (1867) in which he described the prime minister as the primus-inter-pares ("first among equals"). The view was questioned by Richard Crossman in The Myths of Cabinet Government (1972) and by Tony Benn. They were both members of the Labour governments of the 1960s and thought that the position of the prime minister had acquired more power so that prime ministerial government was a more apt description. Crossman stated that the increase in the power of the prime minister resulted from power of centralised political parties, the development of a unified civil service, and the growth of the prime minister's private office and Cabinet secretariat.

Graham Allen (a government whip during Tony Blair's first government) makes the case in The Last Prime Minister: Being Honest About the UK Presidency (2003) that the office of prime minister has presidential powers, as did Michael Foley in The British Presidency (2000). However, the power that a prime minister has over his or her cabinet colleagues is directly proportional to the amount of support that they have with their political parties and this is often related to whether the party considers them to be an electoral asset or liability. Also when a party is divided into factions a prime minister may be forced to include other powerful party members in the Cabinet for party political cohesion. The prime minister's personal power is also curtailed if their party is in a power-sharing arrangement, or a formal coalition with another party (as happened in the coalition government of 2010 to 2015).

== Current Cabinet ==
The current cabinet is led by Prime Minister Andy Burnham and succeeded the Starmer ministry. This is Burnham's first cabinet following the resignation of Keir Starmer on 20 July 2026.

As of 20 July 2026, the makeup of the Cabinet is as follows:

Minister	Office(s)	Department	Start
Full Cabinet
Andy Burnham; MP for Makerfield	Prime Minister; First Lord of the Treasury; Minister for the Civil Service; Minister for the Union	Cabinet Office (including Office for the Prime Minister and Cabinet)	20 July 2026
Louise Haigh; MP for Sheffield Heeley	First Secretary of State; Chancellor of the Duchy of Lancaster (Note: Used as sinecure); Minister for the Cabinet Office	Cabinet Office (including Office for the Prime Minister and Cabinet)	20 July 2026
John Healey; MP for Rawmarsh and Conisbrough	Chancellor of the Exchequer	HM Treasury	20 July 2026
Ed Miliband; MP for Doncaster North	Secretary of State for Foreign, Commonwealth and Development Affairs	Foreign, Commonwealth and Development Office	20 July 2026
Shabana Mahmood; MP for Birmingham Ladywood	Secretary of State for the Home Department	Home Office	5 September 2025
Wes Streeting; MP for Ilford North	Secretary of State for Defence	Ministry of Defence	20 July 2026
Yvette Cooper; MP for Pontefract, Castleford and Knottingley	Secretary of State for Health and Social Care	Department of Health and Social Care	20 July 2026
Alex Norris; MP for Nottingham North and Kimberley	Lord Chancellor; Secretary of State for Justice	Ministry of Justice	20 July 2026
Lucy Powell; MP for Manchester Central	Secretary of State for Education	Department for Education	20 July 2026
Pat McFadden; MP for Wolverhampton South East	Secretary of State for Work and Pensions	Department for Work and Pensions	5 September 2025
Jonathan Reynolds; MP for Stalybridge and Hyde	Secretary of State for Business, Innovation, Science and Trade	Department for Business, Innovation, Science and Trade	20 July 2026
Jonathan Reynolds; MP for Stalybridge and Hyde	President of the Board of Trade	UK Export Finance	20 July 2026
Angela Rayner; MP for Ashton-under-Lyne	Secretary of State for Housing, Communities and Local Government	Ministry of Housing, Communities and Local Government	20 July 2026
Heidi Alexander; MP for Swindon South	Secretary of State for Transport	Department for Transport	29 November 2024
Miatta Fahnbulleh; MP for Peckham	Secretary of State for Energy Security and Net Zero	Department for Energy Security and Net Zero	20 July 2026
Lisa Nandy; MP for Wigan	Secretary of State for Culture, Media and Sport	Department for Culture, Media and Sport	5 July 2024
Dame Angela Eagle; MP for Wallasey	Secretary of State for Environment, Food and Rural Affairs	Department for Environment, Food and Rural Affairs	20 July 2026
Sir Chris Bryant; MP for Rhondda and Ogmore	Secretary of State for Northern Ireland	Northern Ireland Office	20 July 2026
Douglas Alexander; MP for Lothian East	Secretary of State for Scotland	Scotland Office	5 September 2025
Stephen Kinnock; MP for Aberafan Maesteg	Secretary of State for Wales	Wales Office	20 July 2026
Anneliese Midgley; MP for Knowsley	Parliamentary Secretary to the Treasury (Chief Whip)	HM Treasury (Note: Technically a part of the Treasury, but de facto a part of a semi-independent whips office supported by the Cabinet Office.)	20 July 2026
Angela Smith; Life peer	Lord Privy Seal; Leader of the House of Lords	Office of the Leader of the House of Lords (Note: The Office of the Leader of the House of Lords is a ministerial department of the Cabinet Office.)	5 July 2024
Sir Alan Campbell; MP for Tynemouth	Lord President of the Council; Leader of the House of Commons	Office of the Leader of the House of Commons (Note: The Office of the Leader of the House of Commons is a ministerial department of the Cabinet Office.)	5 September 2025
Bridget Phillipson; MP for Houghton and Sunderland South	Minister for Women and Equalities	Ministry of Housing, Communities and Local Government	20 July 2026
Attending Cabinet
Emma Reynolds; MP for Wycombe	Chief Secretary to the Treasury	HM Treasury	20 July 2026
Ellie Reeves; MP for Lewisham West and East Dulwich	Attorney General	Attorney General's Office	20 July 2026
Hamish Falconer; MP for Lincoln	Minister of State (Minister for Intergovernmental Relations and European Relations)	Cabinet Office	20 July 2026
Hamish Falconer; MP for Lincoln	Minister of State (Minister for Intergovernmental Relations and European Relations)	Foreign, Commonwealth and Development Office	20 July 2026
Kanishka Narayan; MP for Vale of Glamorgan	Minister of State (Minister for Artificial Intelligence)	Cabinet Office	20 July 2026
Kanishka Narayan; MP for Vale of Glamorgan	Minister of State (Minister for Artificial Intelligence)	Department for Business, Innovation, Science and Trade	20 July 2026
Matthew Pennycook; MP for Greenwich and Woolwich	Minister of State (Minister for Housing and Planning)	Ministry of Housing, Communities and Local Government	6 July 2024

== List of Cabinets 1895–2026 ==
- Cabinets of the Unionist government, 1895–1905
- Cabinets of Henry Campbell-Bannerman's ministry, 1905–1908
- Cabinets of H. H. Asquith's ministries, 1908–1915
- Cabinets of H. H. Asquith's coalition ministry, 1915–1916
- Cabinets of David Lloyd George's ministries, 1916–1922
- Cabinets of Bonar Law's ministry, 1922–1923
- Cabinets of Stanley Baldwin's first ministry, 1923–1924
- Cabinets of Ramsay MacDonald's first ministry, 1924
- Cabinets of Stanley Baldwin's second ministry, 1924–1929
- Cabinets of Ramsay MacDonald's second ministry, 1929–1931
- Cabinets of Ramsay MacDonald's first national government, 1931
- Cabinets of Ramsay MacDonald's second national government, 1931–1935
- Cabinets of Stanley Baldwin's national government, 1935–1937
- Cabinets of Neville Chamberlain's national government, 1937–1939
- Cabinets of Neville Chamberlain's war ministry, 1939–1940
- Cabinets of Winston Churchill's war ministry, 1940–1945
- Cabinets of Winston Churchill's caretaker ministry, 1945
- Cabinets of Clement Attlee's first ministry, 1945–1950
- Cabinets of Clement Attlee's second ministry, 1950–1951
- Cabinets of Winston Churchill's third ministry, 1951–1955
- Cabinets of Anthony Eden's ministry, 1955–1957
- Cabinets of Harold Macmillan's first ministry, 1957–1959
- Cabinets of Harold Macmillan's second ministry, 1959–1963
- Cabinets of Alec Douglas-Home's ministry, 1963–1964
- Cabinets of Harold Wilson's first and second ministries, 1964–1970
- Cabinets of Ted Heath's ministry, 1970–1974
- Cabinets of Harold Wilson's third and fourth ministries, 1974–1976
- Cabinets of James Callaghan's ministry, 1976–1979
- Cabinets of Margaret Thatcher's first ministry, 1979–1983
- Cabinets of Margaret Thatcher's second ministry, 1983–1987
- Cabinets of Margaret Thatcher's third ministry, 1987–1990
- Cabinets of John Major's first ministry, 1990–1992
- Cabinets of John Major's second ministry, 1992–1997
- Cabinets of Tony Blair's first ministry, 1997–2001
- Cabinets of Tony Blair's second ministry, 2001–2005
- Cabinets of Tony Blair's third ministry, 2005–2007
- Cabinets of Gordon Brown's ministry, 2007–2010
- Cabinets of the Cameron–Clegg coalition, 2010–2015
- Cabinets of David Cameron's second ministry, 2015–2016
- Cabinets of Theresa May's first ministry, 2016–2017
- Cabinets of Theresa May's second ministry, 2017–2019
- Cabinets of Boris Johnson's first ministry, 2019
- Cabinets of Boris Johnson's second ministry, 2019–2022
- Cabinets of Liz Truss's ministry, September 2022 – October 2022
- Cabinets of Rishi Sunak's ministry, 2022–2024
- Cabinets of Keir Starmer's ministry, 2024–2026
- Cabinets of Andy Burnham's ministry, 2026–Present

== See also ==
- British Government frontbench
- List of female cabinet members of the United Kingdom
- Official Opposition Shadow Cabinet
- United Kingdom cabinet committee
