= Ministerial committee =

A ministerial committee is a committee consisting of ministers of various government portfolios.

A joint ministerial committee usually refers to committee consisting of ministers from different governments.

== Australia ==
The term is used in both federal and state governments of Australia.

=== Examples ===
- Federal government
  - Ministerial Committee Inquiry into The Portrayal of Violence in the Electronic Media, May 1996 – July 1996
  - Ministerial Committee to Oversight Implementation of Backing Australia's Ability (MCOIBAA) , later named "Science and Innovation Committee" but still referred to as a Ministerial committee
- New South Wales
  - Ministerial Committee of Inquiry into impotency treatment services
- Northern Territory
  - Ministerial Standing Committee on Crime Prevention
- Western Australia
  - Commercial Passenger Vessel Advisory Committee (CPVAC)
  - Ministerial Committee on Lesbian and Gay Law Reform

=== Joint ministerial committees ===
- Singapore–Australia Joint Ministerial Committee (SAJMC)
- Australia–Japan Ministerial Committee (AJMC)

== United Kingdom ==
An Interministerial Standing Committee exists in the UK as a committee of ministers and members of devolved administrations. It is not an executive body and cannot bind any of its participants. A Joint Ministerial Committee (United Kingdom) existed between 1999 and 2022, which brought together the prime minister of the United Kingdom and the leaders of the three devolved administrations in Northern Ireland, Scotland and Wales.

== See also ==
- Ministerial Committee on Foreign and Security Policy (Finland)
- Ministerial council (disambiguation)
