= Inter-Parliamentary Forum =

British joint parliamentary committee

- Predecessor: Inter-Parliamentary Forum on Brexit
- Formation: 25 February 2022
- Purpose: Interparliamentary relations
- Region served: United Kingdom
- Members: House of Lords; House of Commons; Northern Ireland Assembly; Scottish Parliament; Senedd
- Official languages: English, Welsh

The Inter-Parliamentary Forum (IPF; Welsh: Fforwm Rhyngseneddol) is a mechanism for dialogue and cooperation between the members of the two houses of the UK Parliament, the House of Lords and the House of Commons, and the devolved legislatures of Northern Ireland, Scotland and Wales – the Northern Ireland Assembly, the Scottish Parliament and the Senedd. It is composed of the chairs or conveners of relevant committees of each legislature.

The forum was established in 2022 as the successor to the Inter-Parliamentary Forum on Brexit which first met in 2017 to help coordinate the United Kingdom's withdrawal from the European Union.

== Terms of reference ==
The forum's terms of reference were adopted following its first meeting in February 2022 and are as follows:

"The Interparliamentary Forum provides a collective space to share information about, and does not supplant, each parliament's scrutiny of its executive.

Initial priorities for the forum will include oversight of:

- Inter-governmental relations including agreeing a joint annual report on addressing common scrutiny challenges;
- The operation of international agreements including the Trade and Cooperation Agreement, the Withdrawal Agreement and the Ireland/Northern Ireland Protocol;
- The UK internal market including the UK Internal Market Act and Common Frameworks;
- The impact of the new constitutional arrangements on the legislative process including the use of secondary powers and the legislative consent process.

The Interparliamentary Forum will aim to improve scrutiny in these areas through both a mutual exchange of information and best practice at a parliamentary level and in seeking a consistent approach to improving accountability at both a Ministerial and inter-governmental level."

== Meetings ==
The Inter-Parliamentary Forum usually meets twice a year, in spring and in autumn.

Overview of Interparliamentary Forum meetings
Date	Host	Chair	Joint statement
25 February 2022	House of Lords	John McFall, Baron McFall of Alcluith	
28 October 2022	Senedd	Elin Jones	
24 March 2023	House of Commons	William Wragg	
27 October 2023	Scottish Parliament	Alison Johnstone	
29 February 2024	House of Lords	Jeannie Drake, Baroness Drake; Peter Ricketts, Baron Ricketts	
15 November 2024	Northern Ireland Assembly	Paula Bradshaw; Matthew O’Toole	
12 June 2025	House of Commons	Simon Hoare	

== See also ==
- Intergovernmental relations in the United Kingdom
- Council of Nations and Regions
- Mayoral Council for England
- British–Irish Parliamentary Assembly
- EU–UK Parliamentary Partnership Assembly
- Legislatures of the United Kingdom
- Conference of Parliamentary Committees for Union Affairs
