= United Kingdom common framework policies =

UK internal market policies post-Brexit

The United Kingdom Common Frameworks are a group of legislative and non- legislative policies that aim to create UK wide frameworks and ensure the security and integrity of the UK internal market.

Some of these policies will fall under devolved competence, and others it plans to reserve for central government.

To create a common UK-wide policy area, some policies will require memorandums of understanding and other areas it will declare as reserved matters.

== History ==
On 13 July 2017, the European Union Withdrawal Bill, to govern the UK exit from the EU and make provisions for certain EU laws to be retained where necessary, had its first reading in the House of Commons.

At the end of the transition period, the 160 to 290 EU policies cease to apply to the UK and must be replaced by the United Kingdom's own common framework policies. Some policies are defined by the Northern Ireland Protocol.

On 15 March 2018, the Government of the United Kingdom published a list of common framework policies that it had been sharing as a member of the European Union and that will need to be reassigned following Brexit.

On 23 July 2017 the Scottish government introduced the UK Withdrawal from the European Union (Legal Continuity) (Scotland) Bill into the Scottish Parliament. (Note: Each of the constituent countries with the exception of England have a Devolved Parliament with specific competences that are set out in the Scotland Act 1998, the EU Continuity Bill sought to keep Scotland aligned with the European Union in certain areas that fall within the competence of the Scottish Parliament) On 17 April 2018, the UK Government intervened and referred the Bill to the UK Supreme Court to challenge its legality and get a ruling on whether its provisions for the continuity of law were outwith the legal competence of the Scottish Government and Parliament. On 13 December 2018 the UK Supreme Court ruled that the provisions of the bill would exceed the statutory power of the Scottish Government and Parliament, and the bill was sent back for editing: in the light of the ruling, the Scottish Government abandoned it.

On 26 June 2019, the European Withdrawal Bill passed through Parliament, received Royal Assent, and became an Act.

== Objectives ==
The UK Government proposes to establish common frameworks where it considers them necessary:

- to allow the UK internal market to continue functioning, while acknowledging policy divergence;
- to allow the United Kingdom to continue meeting its international obligations;
- Ensure the UK can negotiate, enter into and implement new trade agreements and international treaties;
- enable the management of common resources;
- to provide administrative support and access to justice in legal case that involve international dispute resolution; and
- safeguard the security of the UK.

== Implementation process ==
=== Non-legislative common frameworks (implementation process) ===
The Government's proposed implementation process is divided into 5 phases:

Key

🔹 = End of phase agreement

🔰 = Task

Phase 1

🔰 Agreement of framework principles

🔰 First Phase of multilateral “deep dives”

Phase 2

🔰 Continued multilateral agreement

🔰 Development of required frameworks legislation

🔰 Beginning of bilateral stakeholders engagement

🔰 Light-touch review and scrutiny of framework outlines

🔹 Outline framework

Phase 3

🔰 Policy Finalisation

🔰 External stakeholder engagement

🔰 In-depth review and assessment process

🔰 Collective agreement on policy approach

🔹 Provisional framework agreement

🔰 Required reappraisal of framework based on outcomes of cross - cutting issues (Phase 4 +5)

Phase 4

🔰 Required legislation in parliamentary passage

🔰 Framework preparation and implementation

🔹 Framework agreement

Phase 5

🔰 Post implementations arrangements

These talks are to be held between the UK Government and the individual Devolved Governments, and the finished frameworks are then subject to agreement in the Joint Ministerial Committee (JMC)

== Legislative common frameworks ==
Below are the 24 Policy areas where the United Kingdom Government plans to create Common Framework Policies for after Brexit using legislation.

Agriculture
Legislation	(Agriculture Act)
Sub areas	Agricultural support; Agriculture - fertiliser regulations; Agriculture - GMO marketing and cultivation; Agriculture - organic farming; Agriculture - zootech; Plant health, seeds and propagating material
Status	Royal Assent 11/11/2020
Chemicals
Sub areas	The REACH etc. (Amendment etc.) (EU Exit) Regulations 2019: Chemicals regulation(including pesticides); Hazardous substances; planning
Status	Complete
Healthcare
Legislation	Reciprocal Cross-Border Public Services Bill
Sub area	Elements of reciprocal healthcare
Stage	Second Reading (House of Commons)
Environment
Legislation	(Environment Act)
Sub areas	Environmental quality - chemicals; Environmental quality - ozone depleting substances and F-gases; Environmental quality - pesticides; Environmental quality - waste packaging and product regulations
Status	Royal Assent 09/11/2021
Fisheries
Legislation	(Fisheries Act)
Sub area	Fisheries management and support
Status	Royal Assent 24/11/2020
Food Safety
Sub areas	The Food and Feed Hygiene and Safety (Miscellaneous Amendments etc.) (EU Exit) Regulations 2020: Food and feed safety and hygiene law food and feed safety and hygiene law, and the controls that verify compliance with food and feed law (official controls); Food compositional standards; Food labelling; Nutrition health claims, composition and labelling
Status	Complete
Emission Trading
Legislation	(Finance Act); The Greenhouse Gas Emissions Trading Scheme Order 2020
Sub area	UK Emissions Trading Scheme
Status	Complete
Qualifications
Legislation	(United Kingdom Internal Market Act 2020)
Sub area	Services; Mutual recognition of professional qualifications (MRPQ)
Status	Royal Assent 21/11/2020
Procurement
Legislation	(Procurement Act 2021)
Sub area	Public procurement
Status	Royal Assent 06/12/2023
Trade Liberation
Sub area	Services Directive

== Common frameworks using alternate implementing methods ==
Below are 79 policy areas that the Government says will require secondary legislation such legislative consent motions

No	Area of Law
BEIS
1.	Company Law
2.	Late payment (commercial transactions)
4.	Radioactive substances
5.	Recognition of insolvency proceedings in EU Member States
6.	Specified quantities and packaged goods legislation
Cabinet Office
8.	Statistics
DEFRA
9.	Air Quality
10.	Biodiversity - Access and Benefit Sharing of Genetic Resources (ABS)
11.	Marine Environment
12.	Spatial Data Infrastructure Standards
13.	Natural Environment and Biodiversity
14.	Waste Management
DFT
15.	Access for non-UK hauliers and passenger transport operations, plus combined transport
16.	Intelligent transport systems
17.	Operator licensing (roads)
18.	Rail technical standards (Interoperability)
19.	Driver licensing
20.	Compulsory (3rd Party) Motor Insurance - as per Part VI Road Traffic Act 1988
DHSC
21.	Clinical trials of medicinal products for human use
22.	Elements of the regulation of tobacco and related products
23.	Good laboratory practice
24.	Medicinal products for human use
25.	Medicine prices
26.	Nutrition health claims, composition and labelling
27.	Blood safety and quality
28.	Organs
29.	Public health (serious cross-border threats to health) (notification system for pandemic flu, Zika etc.)
30.	Tissues and cells (apart from embryos and gametes)
GEO
31.	Equal treatment legislation
HSE
32.	Civil use of explosives
33.	Control of major accident hazards
34.	Genetically modified micro-organisms contained use (i.e. rules on protection of human health and the environment during the development)
MHCLG
35.	Hazardous substances planning
36.	Strategic Environmental Assessment (SEA) Directive

== See also ==
=== Intergovernmental arrangements ===
- Constitution of the United Kingdom
- Intergovernmental relations in the United Kingdom
- Politics of the United Kingdom
- United Kingdom constitutional law

=== Foreign affairs ===
- Foreign relations of the United Kingdom
- Free trade agreements of the United Kingdom

=== UK internal market ===
- UK Internal Market Bill
