= Ministerial council =

Ministerial council or joint ministerial council can refer to:

- EU–GCC Joint Council and Ministerial Meeting, the regular joint ministerial meeting between the European Union and the Cooperation Council for the Arab States of the Gulf
- Franco-German Ministerial Council, the regular joint meeting of the ministerial cabinet of both the government of Germany and the government of France
- Council of the European Union, previous called (and still informally referred to as) Council of Ministers
- Joint Ministerial Council of the Nigeria–São Tomé and Príncipe Joint Development Zone, see Nigeria – São Tomé and Príncipe Joint Development Authority
- North/South Ministerial Council, established under the Belfast Agreement (also known as the Good Friday Agreement), the regular joint meeting of the ministerial cabinet of both the Government of Ireland and the Northern Ireland Executive, to co-ordinate activity and exercise certain governmental powers across the whole island of Ireland
- Intergovernmental relations in the United Kingdom, meetings of the Government of the United Kingdom and the devolved governments/assemblies of the countries of the United Kingdom.

There are also other similar bodies, e.g. the Overseas Territories Joint Ministerial Council and the UK–Gibraltar Joint Ministerial Council.

== See also ==
- Ministerial committee
- International Ministerial Council of Great Britain, formerly the Shiloh United Church of Christ, a Christian denomination based in London
