= United Kingdom Internal Market Act 2020 =

UK law relating to internal trade

- Act of Parliament
- Parliament of the United Kingdom
- Long title: An Act to make provision in connection with the internal market for goods and services in the United Kingdom (including provision about the recognition of professional and other qualifications); to make provision in connection with provisions of the Northern Ireland Protocol relating to trade and state aid; to authorise the provision of financial assistance by Ministers of the Crown in connection with economic development, infrastructure, culture, sport and educational or training activities and exchanges; to make regulation of the provision of distortive or harmful subsidies a reserved or excepted matter; and for connected purposes.
- Citation: 2020 c. 27
- Introduced by: Alok Sharma, Secretary of State for Business, Energy and Industrial Strategy (Commons); Martin Callanan, Parliamentary Under-Secretary of State for Climate Change and Corporate Responsibility (Lords)
- Territorial extent: England and Wales; Scotland; Northern Ireland

Dates
- Royal assent: 17 December 2020
- Commencement: 31 December 2020 23:00
Other legislation
Amends	Scotland Act 1998; Government of Wales Act 2006; Northern Ireland Act 1998; European Union (Withdrawal) Act 2018; Enterprise Act 2002; European Union (Withdrawal Agreement) Act 2020

Status: Current legislation

History of passage through Parliament

Text of statute as originally enacted

Text of the United Kingdom Internal Market Act 2020 as in force today (including any amendments) within the United Kingdom, from legislation.gov.uk.

The United Kingdom Internal Market Act 2020 (c. 27) is an act of the Parliament of the United Kingdom passed in December 2020. Its purpose is to restrict the legislative powers of the devolved administrations in economic, environmental, and public health policy, and to prevent internal trade barriers within the UK. It is one of several pieces of legislation concerning trade that were passed following the European Union membership referendum, as after Brexit the UK is no longer directly subject to EU law.

The UK Government has stated that the legislation's intended purpose is to guarantee the continued seamless functioning of the UK's internal market, and to enshrine in law principles to ensure regulations from one part of the UK are recognised across the country. The Scottish Government has stated that the legislation is intended to introduce wide ranging constraints on devolved competence, and observed that it also authorises financial assistance by UK government ministers on devolved matters, and reserves devolved powers relating to subsidy control. They said that the intent of the bill was a power grab, and in a report published in March 2021 said that the act is undermining the powers and democratic accountability of the Scottish Parliament.

While the bill was before parliament, the Conservative MP and Minister for the Cabinet Office, Michael Gove, described the bill as a measure to preserve the territorial integrity of the United Kingdom. The devolved administrations criticised the bill for its re-centralisation of control over commerce, reversing the devolution of power in the United Kingdom.

The bill was rejected a number of times by the House of Lords. Three of the votes on the bill in the House of Lords are the three largest government defeats in the Lords since 1999. Eventually, the UK government made changes to make it more flexible, and also withdrew some provisions in Part 5 (relating to the Northern Ireland Protocol to the Brexit withdrawal agreement) that had attracted controversy because of their impact on the rule of law. The act was given Royal assent on 17 December 2020, some two weeks before the United Kingdom formally left the European single market.

The Welsh Government sought a judicial review of the legislation. In a hearing in April 2021, two High Court judges refused permission for a full hearing, ruling that the claim was premature in the absence of specific circumstances giving rise to the arguments raised by the Welsh Government.

== Background ==
The United Kingdom joined the European Communities (EC) in 1973. In 1987, the Single European Act, a treaty amendment that sought to increase European integration and establish an internal market, entered into force. This internal market, known as the European single market, was established by 1993, the same year that the EEC and related organisations were reformed into the European Union (EU).

While a member of the EU and thus part of the European Single Market, the United Kingdom helped develop and was subject to common EU-wide rules on a number of policy areas, aimed at harmonising rules and removing trade barriers between the member states. These rules governed UK trade during a period when regulatory powers became devolved in the UK and the Good Friday Agreement on the Northern Ireland peace process was reached.

According to estimates published by the European Commission, more than half of Scotland, Wales and Northern Ireland's trade is with the other parts of the UK, in both exports and imports. The majority of England's trade is outside the UK, but the rest of the UK still accounts for more than 10% of its imports and exports.

In a 2016 referendum the United Kingdom voted to leave the European Union, colloquially known as Brexit. After lengthy negotiations, it left on 1 February 2020, but under the agreed withdrawal agreement it remained a part of the European single market until the end of a transition period lasting until 31 December 2020.

When the transition period ended on 31 December 2020, authority over a number of policy areas held by the EU reverted to the UK. Of these the UK government identified, in an April 2020 analysis, 154 policy areas that intersect with devolved competence.

=== Northern Ireland ===
Article 6 of the Northern Ireland Protocol, included in the withdrawal agreement in October 2019, includes reference to the notion of United Kingdom's internal market:

Having regard to Northern Ireland's integral place in the United Kingdom's internal market, the Union and the United Kingdom shall use their best endeavours to facilitate the trade between Northern Ireland and other parts of the United Kingdom, in accordance with applicable legislation and taking into account their respective regulatory regimes as well as the implementation thereof. The Joint Committee shall keep the application of this paragraph under constant review and shall adopt appropriate recommendations with a view to avoiding controls at the ports and airports of Northern Ireland to the extent possible.

— Article 6: Protection of the UK internal market

== History ==
In October 2016, following the first meeting of the Joint Ministerial Committee for two years (and its first following the EU membership referendum), Downing Street announced the formation of a Joint Ministerial Committee on EU Negotiations (to be known as "JMC(EN)"). As well as working collaboratively on the EU negotiations, its terms of reference include "issues stemming from the negotiation process which may impact upon or have consequences for the UK Government, the Scottish Government, the Welsh Government or the Northern Ireland Executive". At its meeting in October 2017, the JMC(EN) discussed the progress being made on consideration of common frameworks and agreed the principles that will underpin that work. A key function of the common frameworks, agreed at the meeting, is to:

enable the functioning of the UK internal market, while acknowledging policy divergence

The common frameworks are a mechanism for the UK and devolved governments to mutually agree some amount of regulatory consistency for policy areas where returning EU powers are within devolved competence. They are sector-specific and jointly agreed between the UK government and the devolved administrations.

The amendments in the enacted version of the European Union (Withdrawal) Act 2018 put in place the presumption that retained EU law, in areas of devolved competence, will remain within the remit of the devolved legislatures. That legislation allows the UK government to restrict devolved competence by way of regulations, but puts the onus on Whitehall to specify particular powers it intends to protect from modification.

In that context, the common frameworks process led to a long-running disagreement between the UK government and the devolved governments. This was particularly focused on what would happen where a common framework agreement could not be reached. The UK government argued that in such an instance they should be able to decide on regulations unilaterally for the UK as a whole. The Scottish government rejected this argument. There was dispute over whether the devolved administrations should merely be consulted on proposed legislative changes, or that such changes should require their consent.

=== Publication of the bill ===
Following the 2019 election the UK Government said in the queen's speech, in a part titled "The Union", that they intended to "maintain and strengthen" the UK's internal market following Brexit. An analysis published by the Cabinet Office in April 2020 pointed at 18 areas where legislation might be needed for a common framework, 22 areas where agreements with the devolved legislatures were believed to be sufficient (in addition to adjustments to retained EU law), and 115 areas where there were no plans for common frameworks.

On 16 July 2020 the UK Government published its white paper for the bill, which it said would guarantee the continued seamless functioning of the UK's internal market, and enshrine in law principles to ensure regulations from one part of the UK are recognised across the country. The government started a consultation on the white paper, which ran for four weeks and finished on 13 August.

The legislation significantly constrains legislative powers of the devolved administrations both legally and practically. A primary purpose of the legislation is to restrict the capacity of the devolved institutions to use their regulatory autonomy. The UK Government claimed shortly after publication of the white paper that the legislation and related common frameworks were a "power surge" for the devolved administrations. This notion is contradicted by the body of scholarly literature published on the issue, and by the House of Lords Select Committee on the Constitution. The impact assessment that the BEIS department was obliged to publish alongside the bill states: "The final cost of this legislation is the potentially reduced ability for different parts of the UK to achieve local policy benefits. While this legislation does not constrain the ability of different parts of the UK to introduce distinct policies, to the extent that those policies may be enforceable on a reduced number of businesses might make it harder to realise fully the benefits of those policies." Both the Welsh and Scottish governments referred to the legislation as a "power grab".

On 9 September 2020 the bill was formally introduced in the House of Commons and published accordingly. The bill explicitly included provisions that were incompatible with the Withdrawal Agreement and thus, as the government acknowledged, illegal under international law. In a written statement published on 10 September 2020, the government cited the 2017 decision of the Supreme Court in R (Miller) v Secretary of State for Exiting the European Union as supporting the government's position that "Parliament is sovereign as a matter of domestic law and can pass legislation which [sic] is in breach of the UK’s Treaty obligations."

The bill put the reservation to Westminster of the power to regulate state aid into primary legislation. It also gave UK Government formal spending powers in areas of devolved competence. This provision gives the UK Government the power to fund projects directly without the involvement of the devolved administrations.

Labour, Liberal Democrats, Scottish National Party and Plaid Cymru all opposed the bill in parliament. The Democratic Unionist Party of Northern Ireland was generally supportive, however Sinn Féin, the Social Democratic and Labour Party, and the Alliance Party all heavily criticised the original part of the bill that would have allowed the Northern Ireland Secretary of State to break the Northern Ireland Protocol.

Shortly after the bill was published there were several resignations due to its content. On 8 September 2020, Jonathan Jones resigned his job as head of the Government Legal Department owing to concerns about "the legal implications of Britain's failure to secure a post-Brexit trade deal with the EU". On 14 September, Rehman Chishti resigned his position as the Prime Minister's Special Envoy for Freedom of Religion or Belief, noting in his resignation letter that "I can't support [the] Internal Market Bill in its current form, which unilaterally break UK's legal commitments." On 16 September, Richard Keen resigned his position as Advocate General for Scotland citing concerns arising from the UK Internal Market Bill, noting in his resignation letter to Boris Johnson that he found it "increasingly difficult to reconcile what I consider to be my obligations as a Law Officer with your policy intentions". On 18 September, barrister Amal Clooney resigned as the UK's special envoy on media freedom, noting in her resignation letter that "it is lamentable for the UK to be speaking of its intention to violate an international treaty signed by the prime minister less than a year ago."

=== Part 5 of the bill: Northern Ireland protocol ===
Some provisions in Part 5 of the bill, clauses 40 to 45, caused considerable controversy both in the UK and internationally. There were concerns about their impact on the rule of law. The UK government ultimately withdrew them before enactment.

Brandon Lewis, Secretary of State for Northern Ireland, told the House of Commons that the bill would "break international law in a specific and limited way", by overriding article four of the Brexit withdrawal agreement; specifically by modifying the movement, sale, certification, and oversight of products in Northern Ireland. The government said that the decision to do so was prompted by potential bans on the sale of GB agri-food products in Northern Ireland, should trade negotiations with the European Union fail. The bill was criticised by the European Union for similar reasons.

The Attorney General Suella Braverman stated the UK Government’s legal position about the possible impact of the Bill on the Northern Ireland Protocol:

It is an established principle of international law that a state is obliged to discharge its treaty obligations in good faith. This is, and will remain, the key principle in informing the UK’s approach to international relations. However, in the difficult and highly exceptional circumstances in which we find ourselves, it is important to remember the fundamental principle of Parliamentary sovereignty. ¶ Parliament is sovereign as a matter of domestic law and can pass legislation which is in breach of the UK’s Treaty obligations. Parliament would not be acting unconstitutionally in enacting such legislation. This ‘dualist’ approach is shared by other, similar legal systems […].

Senior members of the bar and the judiciary, including the former President of the Supreme Court, David Neuberger, criticised the clause that would prevent any judicial review of its operation. Lord Neuberger indicated that in a situation where the right to challenge the government in court is removed, "you are in a dictatorship, you are in a tyranny".

On 8 December 2020 Chancellor Michael Gove and European Union Vice-President of the European Commission for Interinstitutional Relations, Maroš Šefčovič, reached an 'agreement in principle' by which the UK government withdrew some provisions in Part 5 of the bill.

==== Provisions in part 5 ====
Section 46 (originally clause 40) provides that UK government ministers, devolved government ministers and anybody else exercising a function of public nature, when exercising a function relating to the protocol or the movement of goods within the UK, must have special regard for Northern Ireland’s place in the UK internal market and customs territory and the need for a free flow of goods between Great Britain and Northern Ireland.

Section 47 (clause 41) provides that UK government ministers, devolved government ministers and anybody else exercising a function of public nature, must not exercise a function that would result in any new Northern Ireland-Great Britain check, control or administrative process in some circumstances after the transition period ends.

Sections 48 and 49 (clauses 43 and 44) empowers only the Secretary of State to comply with state aid requirements in the protocol to give the European Commission a notification or information relating to state aid and to make secondary legislation in relation to state aid in the protocol.

The UK government withdrew clauses 42 and 45 before enactment. Clause 42 would have empowered ministers to make secondary legislation about the application of exit procedures or a description of goods moving from Northern Ireland to Great Britain. Clause 45 would have provided such secondary legislation to have effect, irrespective of whether it was incompatible or inconsistent with domestic or international law.

=== Passage through parliament ===
On 15 September the bill passed its second reading in the House of Commons, by 340 MPs to 263 MPs, following a failed amendment to not hold a second reading proposed by the Labour Party leader Keir Starmer. In total, out of 364 Conservative MPs, 328 voted in favour of the bill at its second reading and two voted against.

On 29 September the bill passed its third reading in the House of Commons by 340 votes to 256, and went to the House of Lords for consideration and review. Earlier in the day, a new clause that would require "ministers to respect the rule of law and uphold the independence of the courts" was voted down 256 to 350, those voting against being from Conservative and Democratic Unionist parties. Three votes on the bill in the House of Lords, in October and November, remain the three largest government defeats in the house since 1999.

In December after multiple defeats in the House of Lords, the UK government made changes which they said would allow a certain amount of divergence from the internal market rules for the devolved administrations, where these were agreed through the common frameworks. It also allowed the Lords to remove those provisions of the Bill that were in breach of international law. The act received royal assent on 17 December, and came into force on 31 December.

The UK government did not seek legislative consent from the devolved legislatures. However the Scottish Parliament still held a consent vote, where consent was denied. This was only the second act after the EU Withdrawal Act 2020 where the Scottish Parliament has withheld consent since the Parliament was established in 1998.

=== Developments after enactment ===
In January 2021 the Counsel General for Wales, Jeremy Miles, announced the Welsh Government would seek judicial review of the legislation. The Welsh Government argued that it would curtail the power of the Senedd, the devolved legislature in Wales. The UK government argued the Act did not alter devolved competences. In a hearing in April 2021, two judges of the High Court of Justice ruled that the judicial review could not proceed "in the absence of specific circumstances giving rise to the arguments raised by the claimant and a specific legislative context in which to test and assess those arguments."

== Provisions ==
=== Mutual recognition and non-discrimination principles ===
The act introduces the principles of mutual recognition and non-discrimination into UK trade law. These mean that goods able to be sold in one part of the UK can be sold across the country.

While the act continues to allow devolved governments to set their own regulations on paper, the mutual recognition principle disapplies these rules to goods and services from other parts of the UK, ensuring that when goods and services can be legally sold in one part of the UK, they can legally be sold in all other parts too.

By doing so, the legislation restricts the devolved authorities' practical capacity to regulate. It puts "frictionless economic exchange" before all other aims of public policy.

The principle of non-discrimination forbids devolved governments from enacting regulations that discriminate between goods produced in, and services provided from, other parts of the UK. This includes both direct discrimination, and indirect discrimination that puts products and services from other parts of the UK at a disadvantage, compared to local products and services. Some service categories are explicitly exempted – these include broadcasting, financial services and postal services.

The act also ensures that professional qualifications in from one part of the UK are automatically recognised in all other parts; this means that people are free to move to other parts, while not having to re-qualify. Some exceptions apply, including when there is a process in place for having one's qualifications recognised (i.e. not automatically).

=== Office for the Internal Market ===
The legislation establishes an Office for the Internal Market within the Competition and Markets Authority. The objective of the OIM is monitor the UK internal market and report on any problems. It can instigate such investigations into issues itself, or at the behest of the UK government or one of the devolved administrations. It also required representation of Scotland, Wales and Northern Ireland on the board of the CMA. Unlike its EU counterpart, the OIM does not have the power to enforce decisions.

=== Spending powers ===
The act gives the UK Government the ability to directly spend on projects within Scotland, Wales and Northern Ireland, even if those policy areas normally fall under devolved competence.

=== Subsidy control ===
The act makes regulating subsidy (but not the granting of subsidy) a matter reserved for the UK government, something the UK government argue it already was, whereas the Scottish and Welsh government argue it was devolved. This regulation had previously been done by the EU (see State aid (European Union)). The UK government had stated there will be no system put in place, beyond the WTO requirements. The government will publish guidance on how to comply with these requirements. However, the statement also notes that the government will publish a consultation on whether it should go further than its international commitments. This implies that in the future the government will consider stronger obligations – though it is not clear whether this amount to anything like the obligations of state aid.

=== Constitutional status ===
The act is a protected enactment which gives it a protected constitutional status, so that it cannot be superseded by devolved legislation even in areas of devolved legislatures' competence.

== Effect on devolution ==
The act is intended to restrict the exercise of devolved competences both legally and practically. It has several effects on the constitutional arrangements regarding devolved legislative powers. Principal amongst these is the effect that the market access principles will have on the practical ability of the devolved administrations to regulate economic activity. It also expressly reserves the regulation of state aid to the UK Government, and gives them spending powers in numerous policymaking areas. These powers undermine the authority of the devolved institutions to determine infrastructure priorities within their respective jurisdiction. The Act has less of a restrictive impact on devolution in Northern Ireland than in Scotland and Wales.

The UK government argues that the market access principles do not affect the powers of the devolved legislatures and governments. While the powers remain similar "on paper", in practical and legal terms they are significantly constrained. The principles undermine devolved competences in two ways. These relate to its status as a protected enactment, and to the disproportionate market size and power of the economy under English jurisdiction. Because the devolved governments will be unable to disapply the market access principles, if they attempt to introduce new or stricter regulatory standards, they will only apply to goods produced within the devolved jurisdiction. This means that these standards will have little or no practical effect other than to disadvantage their own economy, severely restricting their ability to introduce regulatory divergence, or pursue different economic or social choices to those made in Westminster.

In an editorial in January 2021 concerning rising support for Scottish independence and its potential to break up the union, the Financial Times indicated that the Internal Market Act was an inappropriate response:

An example of what not to do was the government’s Internal Market Act, in which London retook control of structural funds previously disbursed by the EU.

In a report published in March 2021, the Scottish Government stated that the act is "radically undermining the powers and democratic accountability of the Scottish Parliament."

For example, Wales, England and Scotland have independently removed mutual recognition clauses for spreadable fats arriving from non-EU EEA countries. This means these products must specifically comply with standards set in Welsh law, rather than being automatically recognised. Research by the Senedd found that due the market access principles of the UKIMA, if such a fat was brought into England or Scotland in compliance with those countries' laws, it could also be sold in Wales, even if it did not comply with the new Welsh laws.

=== Exclusions process ===
In December 2021 the UK Government and devolved administrations agreed a process for considering exclusions from the market access principles. Since its introduction, the Scottish Government, with the support of the Welsh Government, has sought an exclusion from the Act for its single-use plastics legislation. In 2023 the Scottish Government cited UK Government refusal to issue a full exclusion to the Act as grounds for postponing their planned bottle deposit scheme until October 2025 earliest, the time when a UK-wide scheme is hoped to be implemented.

== Responses in the UK ==
=== Devolved governments ===
Prior to the passage of the bill, the UK Government's plans for the UK's internal market, post-Brexit, raised constitutional questions for the devolved administrations.

The Scottish and Welsh governments criticised the bill for its re-centralisation of control over commerce, which they see as reversing the devolution of power in the United Kingdom. The Scottish National Party stated "The Tory power grab bill represents the biggest threat to devolution in decades, and would enable Westminster to overrule the democratic will of the Scottish Parliament". The UK government disputes the devolved administrations' interpretation saying it is instead a power surge for devolution.

==== Northern Ireland ====
In Northern Ireland, First Minister Arlene Foster said Northern Ireland businesses need "unfettered access" to the market in Britain along with guarantees they would not be discriminated against. Foster said that "it was 'important' that Northern Ireland has unfettered access to the rest of the U.K." but that the issue was a "matter for the ministers in Whitehall and in Westminster". Christopher Stalford, a DUP assembly-member for South Belfast said in Stormont on 14 September 2020 that "there is great rejoicing over one sinner that repents" – a biblical reference to Johnson's proposed change of heart on the Northern Ireland Protocol.

Deputy First Minister Michelle O'Neill has said that "Brandon Lewis and the entire British cabinet do not care about what happens to us in the north. They have demonstrated that time and time again they are prepared to use us here in the north as a pawn in the Brexit negotiations – this is an international agreement which was painstakingly struck after months of negotiations." O'Neill said the Withdrawal Agreement protects the Good Friday Agreement and it was "astounding" the UK government "thinks it's fine" to wreck an international treaty they had signed up to.

The DUP's chief whip at Westminster, Sammy Wilson, told BBC Radio Ulster that he would "reserve judgement" until he saw the bill in full, but that the "Northern Ireland question was back on the agenda".

==== Scotland ====
The Scottish Government rejected the UK government's internal market plans since first proposed in July 2020, with the First Minister of Scotland Nicola Sturgeon quoted as saying that the plans are "riding roughshod over the powers of the Scottish parliament". It did not rule out legal action. Sturgeon described the bill as "an abomination which would cripple devolution" and that "the UK government are not only set to break international law – it is clear they are now set to break devolution". She tweeted on 9 September 2020 that it is a "full frontal assault on devolution" and later said it was an "abomination on almost every level".

The SNP's Westminster Leader Ian Blackford said to Boris Johnson during Prime Minister's Questions on 9 September 2020 that he was "creating a rogue state where the rule of law does not apply" and that "the time for Scotland's place as an independent, international, law-abiding nation is almost here". Former acting Scottish Labour leader Alex Rowley has described it as "a farce that threatens the very foundations of the United Kingdom".

On 7 October 2020 the Scottish Parliament voted 90 to 28 to refuse legislative consent.

In 2023 the Scottish Government published a paper on the effect of Brexit on the devolved governments. In this document, it explained the significant and regressive impact of the IMA on devolution. Devolution Since the Brexit Referendum

==== Wales ====
The Welsh Government has described it as "an attack on democracy and an affront to the people of Wales, Scotland and Northern Ireland" and accused Westminster of "stealing powers".

First Minister of Wales, Mark Drakeford, called the UK internal market plans a "power grab". He said it represented a "smash and grab" on the devolved governments and takes back powers that have been devolved to Wales, Northern Ireland and Scotland for 20 years. Plaid Cymru leader, Adam Price, said that the bill signifies "the destruction of two decades of devolution".

The Welsh Government minister and Counsel General, Jeremy Miles, said on 8 September 2020 that "the U.K. government plans to sacrifice the future of the union by stealing powers from devolved administrations ... the bill is an attack on democracy."

=== Westminster ===
Members of the Commons and the Lords, on both sides of the Houses, expressed their concern at those clauses of the bill that would seek to set aside unilaterally the Northern Ireland protocol of the UK's withdrawal agreement, with the Lords ultimately making successful amendments to remove Part 5 of the bill.

The bill drew criticism from all five living former prime ministers: John Major, Tony Blair, Gordon Brown, David Cameron, and Theresa May. May said that "the United Kingdom government signed the withdrawal agreement with the Northern Ireland Protocol. This Parliament voted that withdrawal agreement into UK legislation. The government is now changing the operation of that agreement. How can the government reassure future international partners that the UK can be trusted to abide by the legal obligations of the agreements it signs?" John Major said "For generations, Britain's word – solemnly given – has been accepted by friend and foe. Our signature on any treaty or agreement has been sacrosanct. If we lose our reputation for honouring the promises we make, we will have lost something beyond price that may never be regained."

Another former Conservative leader, Michael Howard, has said "Does [the minister] not understand the damage done to our reputation for probity and respect for the rule of law by those five words uttered by his ministerial colleague in another place on Tuesday – words that I never thought I would hear uttered by a British minister, far less a Conservative minister. How can we reproach Russia or China or Iran when their conduct falls below internationally accepted standards when we are showing such scant regard for our treaty obligations?"

Conservative MP Roger Gale said he would not support the bill: "put simply, I will not vote to break the law". Similarly, former Attorney General Geoffrey Cox and former Chancellor of the Exchequer Sajid Javid, who both, until February 2020, served in Johnson's government and are both Conservative MPs, have also said that they cannot support the bill.

Nonetheless, the government did not have any resignations over the bill, including by the Lord Chancellor or the Attorney General, whose roles have a special focus on the rule of law. Neither has the Conservative Party seen any of its MPs leave the party over the bill yet.

Conservative MP Bill Cash has spoken positively of the bill in the House of Commons, concluding: "The Bill is needed as an insurance policy and as a guarantee of our national sovereignty within the meaning of the Vienna convention, and our national security."

On 15 September 2020 at the second reading of the bill in the House of Commons, Conservative MPs Roger Gale and Andrew Percy voted against the bill while 30 others abstained.

On 20 October 2020 while moving to the second reading of the bill, the House of Lords voted 395 against 169 approving the motion of regret "that Part 5 of the bill contains provisions which, if enacted, would undermine the rule of law and damage the reputation of the United Kingdom", an amendment proposed by Lord Judge, former Lord Chief Justice. The vote over this amendment was the biggest defeat (a margin of 226) for the government in the Lords since 1999. Conservative Party Lords voting against the government included the recently resigned Advocate General for Scotland, Lord Keen; former Chief of Staff to Theresa May, Gavin Barwell; former party leader Michael Howard; former Chancellors of the Exchequer, Kenneth Clarke and Norman Lamont; and former European Commissioner Christopher Tugendhat.

=== Former Supreme Court judge and other legal views ===
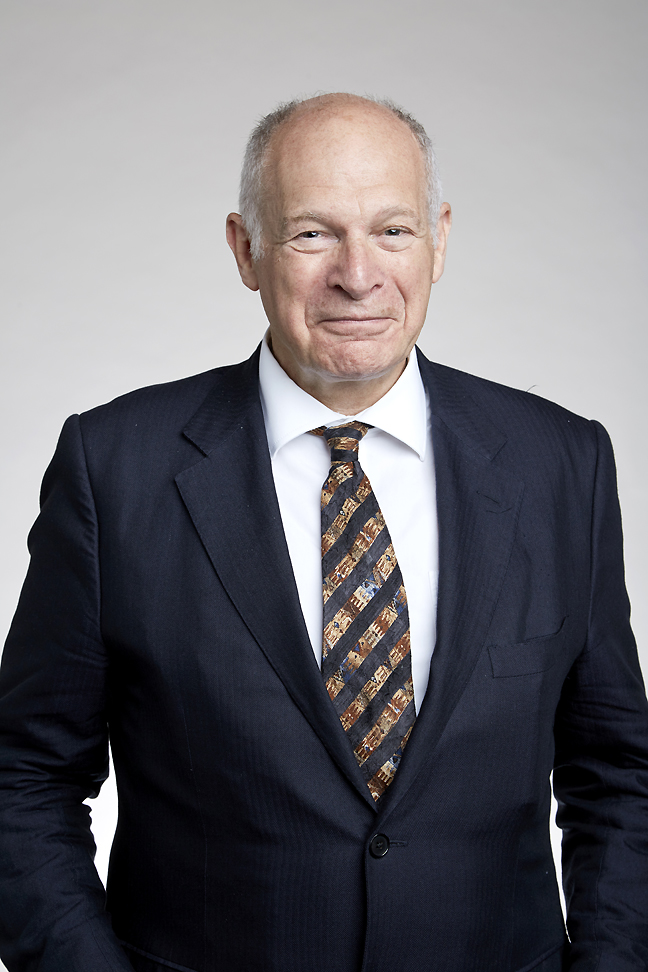
Lord Neuberger, English judge and former President of the UK Supreme Court

On 7 October 2020, former President of the Supreme Court, Lord Neuberger, condemned the clause in the Bill that would prevent judicial review:

Once you deprive people of the right to go to court to challenge the government, you are in a dictatorship, you are in a tyranny. The right of litigants to go to court to protect their rights and ensure that the government complies with its legal obligation is fundamental to any system ... You could be going down a very slippery slope.

Former Attorney General Dominic Grieve QC, who lost his seat after his Conservative whip was removed for rebelling against Johnson in September 2019, said that this "ouster clause ... goes to the heart of parliamentary democracy", preventing the government being challenged over its actions. Former Home Secretary Michael Howard told the meeting that he was "opposed to the clauses in the bill which breach international law". Other senior barristers who stated their opposition (at an online conference arranged by the International Bar Association) included SNP MP Joanna Cherry QC, Labour peer Helena Kennedy QC, and Jessica Simor QC.

=== Church leaders ===
In a letter to The Financial Times on 19 October 2020, the Primates of the Anglican Communion churches of the four nations of the United Kingdom said that the bill would "create a disastrous precedent" by "equip[ping] a government minister to break international law. This has enormous moral, as well as political and legal, consequences".

=== Business ===
The Confederation of British Industry supported the legislation, highlighting "the Bill should ensure that following the UK's exit from the EU, no new barriers to trade between England, Scotland and Wales should be established, and for the legislation to work effectively in Northern Ireland, the Bill must work in lockstep with the Northern Ireland Protocol."

The Federation of Small Businesses welcomed the principles of Mutual Recognition and non-discrimination noting that "Both principles are critical to the proper functioning of the UK Internal Market for small and micro businesses."

The British Retail Consortium's head of devolved nations said in response to the BEIS white paper "We must not lose sight of the fact that consumers and our economy as a whole benefits enormously from the UK's largely unfettered internal single market, as economies of scale and regulatory consistency helps reduce business costs which in turn keeps down shop prices and provides greater consumer choice. Increasingly differential approaches towards public policy in different parts of the UK may well offer new flexibilities, however it also risks a more fragmented environment for firms operating across the UK."

British Chambers of Commerce set out their view as follows: "a fragmented system would create additional costs, bureaucracy and supply chain challenges that could disrupt operations for firms across the UK. As these proposals progress, business communities will want practical considerations – not politics – at the heart of the debate and shaping solutions."

The National Farmers Union supported the legislation. Scottish NFU's position was more nuanced as though highlighting that the UK internal market is vital for Scottish farmers they raised concerns that the bill would damage work on common frameworks. The Ulster Farmers' Union welcomed the UK Government's initiative to put in place a legislative framework to safeguard the functioning of the UKIM

Allie Renison, Head of Europe and Trade Policy at the Institute of Directors, said:

Directors want to see as much predictability and stability as possible when the Brexit transition period ends. Keeping disruption of trading arrangements to a minimum is crucial, particularly as the Withdrawal Agreement provides for unprecedented new arrangements between Great Britain and Northern Ireland. Codifying the UK Internal Market in law for continuity purposes after Brexit is an important aim, but further clarity is still needed for directors to understand the full practical operation of them. At present, EU law provides a transparent level playing field for businesses, where enforcement and dispute settlement rules are clear. Maintaining that clarity for commerce across the UK once transition ends is critical. However, directors will be wary of any moves that could increase the likelihood of no deal.

== International responses ==
=== European Commission ===
After The Financial Times had sight of the bill on 6 September and said that Government of the UK appeared intent on breaking international law, Commission President Ursula von der Leyen warned Johnson not to break international law, saying that the UK's implementation of the withdrawal agreement was a "prerequisite for any future partnership". On 1 October 2020, the European Commission sent to the UK Government "a letter of formal notice for breaching its obligations under the Withdrawal Agreement" because the latter's refusal to remove the contentious clauses in the bill. The letter marked "the first step of an infringement process".

=== Ireland ===
On 9 September Irish Taoiseach (Prime Minister) Micheál Martin tweeted "Any negotiation process can only proceed on the basis of trust. When one party to a negotiation decides that they can change what’s already agreed and incorporated into law, it really undermines trust. This is a critical time in the #Brexit process and the stakes are very high."

=== United States ===
The Speaker of the House of Representatives Nancy Pelosi said "if the U.K. violates that international treaty and Brexit undermines the Good Friday accord, there will be absolutely no chance of a U.S.-U.K. trade agreement passing the Congress".

During the passage of the bill Joe Biden (before being elected President) also warned he would not sign a trade deal with the UK if the Prime Minister pressed ahead with the controversial clauses of the bill regarding the Northern Ireland Protocol.

== See also ==
- Devolution in the United Kingdom
- United Kingdom common framework policies
- Law of the United Kingdom
