= Lord President's Committee =

The Lord President's Committee was a United Kingdom cabinet committee during the Second World War. This committee oversaw many aspects of home affairs, most notably the economy, and was vital to the smooth running of the British war economy and consequently the entire British war effort. Because of this, it was always headed by a senior politician and became one of the responsibilities given to successive Lord Presidents of the Council. These were:

- Neville Chamberlain (11 May 1940 – 3 October 1940)
- Sir John Anderson (3 October 1940 – 24 September 1943)
- Clement Attlee (24 September 1943 – 23 May 1945)
