= Advisory Council on Foreign Affairs =

Advisory council of the Swedish Parliament

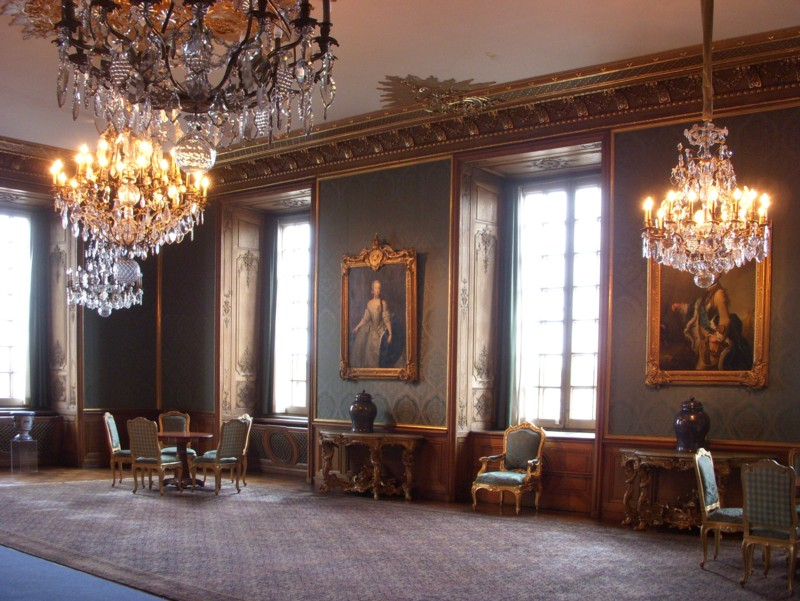
Lovisa Ulrikas dining room at Stockholm Palace where the Foreign Affairs Council meets.

The Advisory Council on Foreign Affairs (Swedish: Utrikesnämnden) is a permanent council appointed by the Riksdag and led by the King. It operates as a consultational organ between the Riksdag and the Government regarding matters of Foreign Affairs.

== History and function ==
The Advisory Council on Foreign Affairs was established in 1921 as a result to an amendment to the 1809 Instrument of Government.

Due to the sensitive nature of the councils deliberations some parties have historically been excluded from the council. The formerly communist Left Party was excluded until 1994 after the fall of the Soviet Union. The Sweden Democrats were also excluded in their first Riksdag term between 2010 and 2014.

The Government has to keep the Advisory Council on Foreign Affairs informed of foreign policy matters that can have an impact on Sweden and shall hold deliberations with the Council when necessary. If possible, the Government must deliberate with the Council ahead of all major foreign policy decisions.

The Government convenes the meetings of the Advisory Council on Foreign Affairs. The Government must convene a meeting if at least four of the council's members request discussions on a specific matter.

The Advisory Council on Foreign Affairs consists of the Speaker and 18 members of the Riksdag, nine of whom are members and nine of whom are deputy members. The members are appointed by the Riksdag for each electoral period. The council is chaired by the King. If the King is unable to attend, the Prime Minister is chair. The chair can decide that an unconditional duty of confidentiality shall apply at meetings.

If Sweden finds itself at war the members of the Advisory Council on Foreign Affairs, if possible after consultation with the Prime Minister, may decide that the War Delegation replace the Riksdag. Should the Council be unable to convene as a result of the war, this decision may be taken by the Government. The King does not take part in this decision.

== See also ==
- Ministerial Committee on Foreign and Security Policy in Finland
