= Ministerial Committee on Foreign and Security Policy =

The Ministerial Committee on Foreign and Security Policy (abbreviated hutva or utva, Finnish: hallituksen ulko- ja turvallisuuspoliittinen ministerivaliokunta; Swedish: utrikes- och säkerhetspolitiska ministerutskottet) is one of the four ministerial committees of the Finnish Government, established by statute since 2000. The task of the committee is to handle matters related to Finland's foreign and security policy, as well as matters of internal security and total defence when they are related to foreign and security policy. Nowadays it meets practically always jointly with the President of Finland, so it is often referred to as tp-utva, referring to the President of the Republic ("tp", Finnish: tasavallan presidentti) and the ministerial committee itself ("utva").

The committee is chaired by the prime minister. The other members are the minister of foreign affairs, the minister of defence, and up to four other ministers appointed by the government. If the government has a so-called second minister in the Ministry for Foreign Affairs, this minister is also a member of the committee. In addition, the minister of the interior and other ministers participate in the committee if issues related to their areas of activity are being discussed.

== See also ==
- Advisory Council on Foreign Affairs in Sweden
