= First secretaryship of Louise Haigh =

Louise Haigh's tenure at First Secretary of State (2026-present)

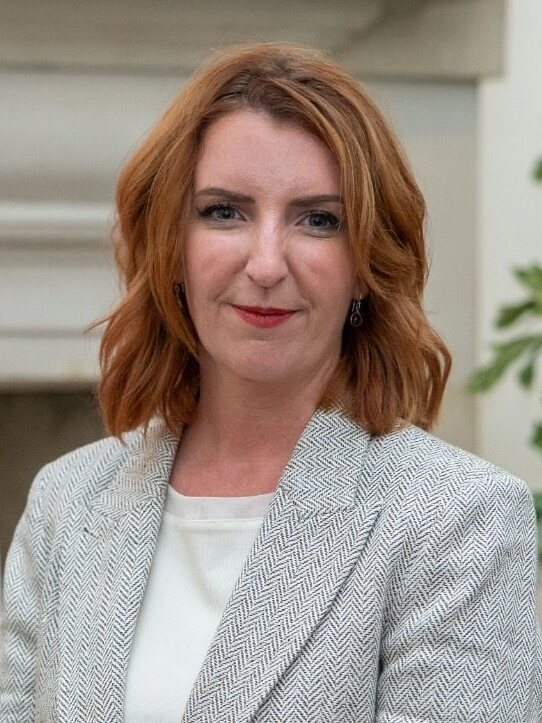
- Official portrait, 2026
- First secretaryship of Louise Haigh; 20 July 2026 – present
- Party: Labour
- Nominated by: Andy Burnham
- Appointed by: Charles III
- Seat: 11 Downing Street

Louise Haigh became First Secretary of State on 20 July 2026, upon her appointment by Prime Minister Andy Burnham, succeeding David Lammy as Deputy prime minister.

== Term ==
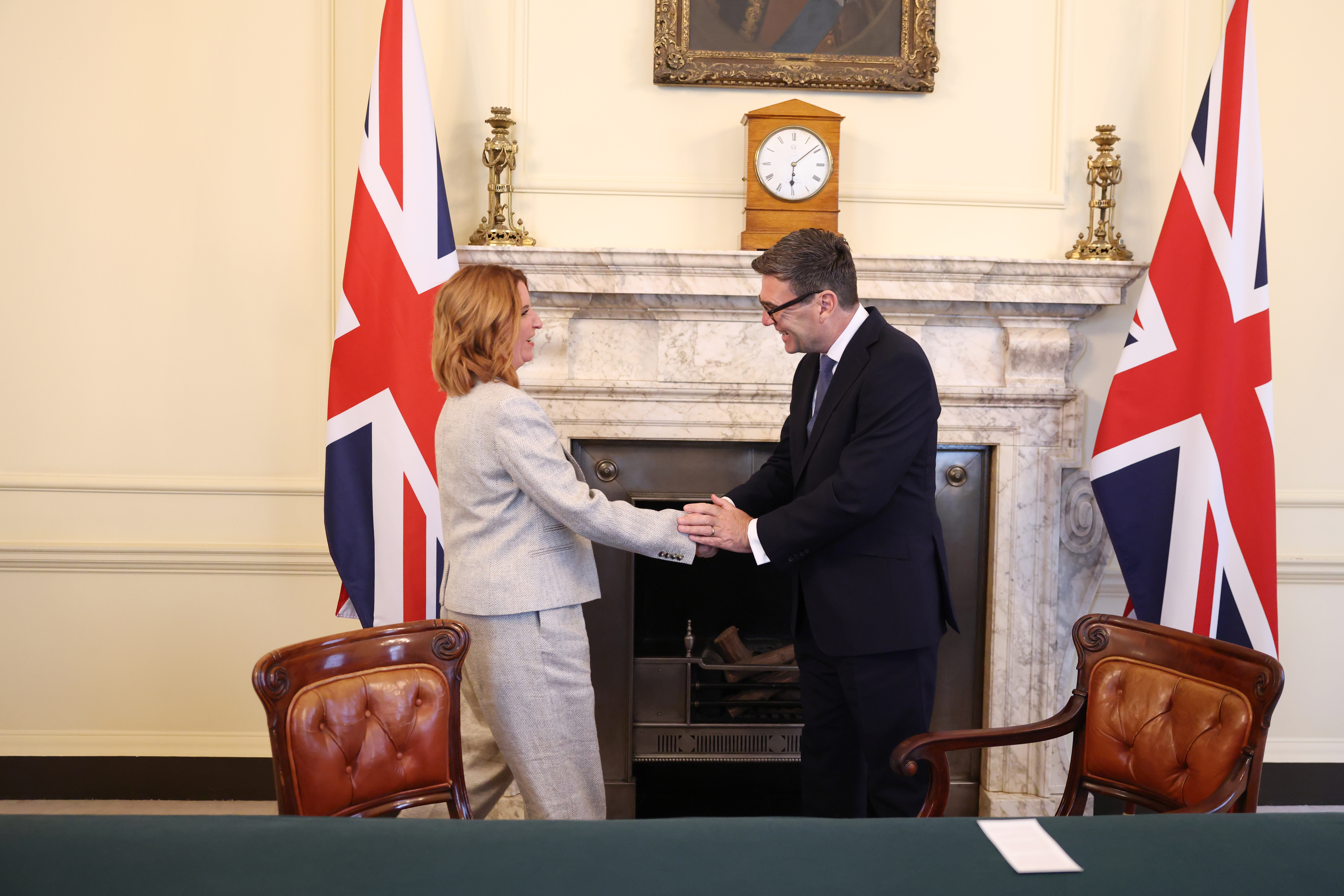
Andy Burnham appointing Haigh to his cabinet on 20 July 2026

Haigh was one of the key figures in Labour party leadership and Prime Minister hopeful Andy Burnham's 2026 Makerfield by-election victory and his leadership campaign. The New Statesman reported that, consequently, Haigh had "more power than many of the colleagues she left behind in cabinet".

On 20 July 2026, Haigh was appointed First Secretary of State, Chancellor of the Duchy of Lancaster, and Minister for the Cabinet Office under Burnham.
