= Joint Ministerial Committee (United Kingdom) =

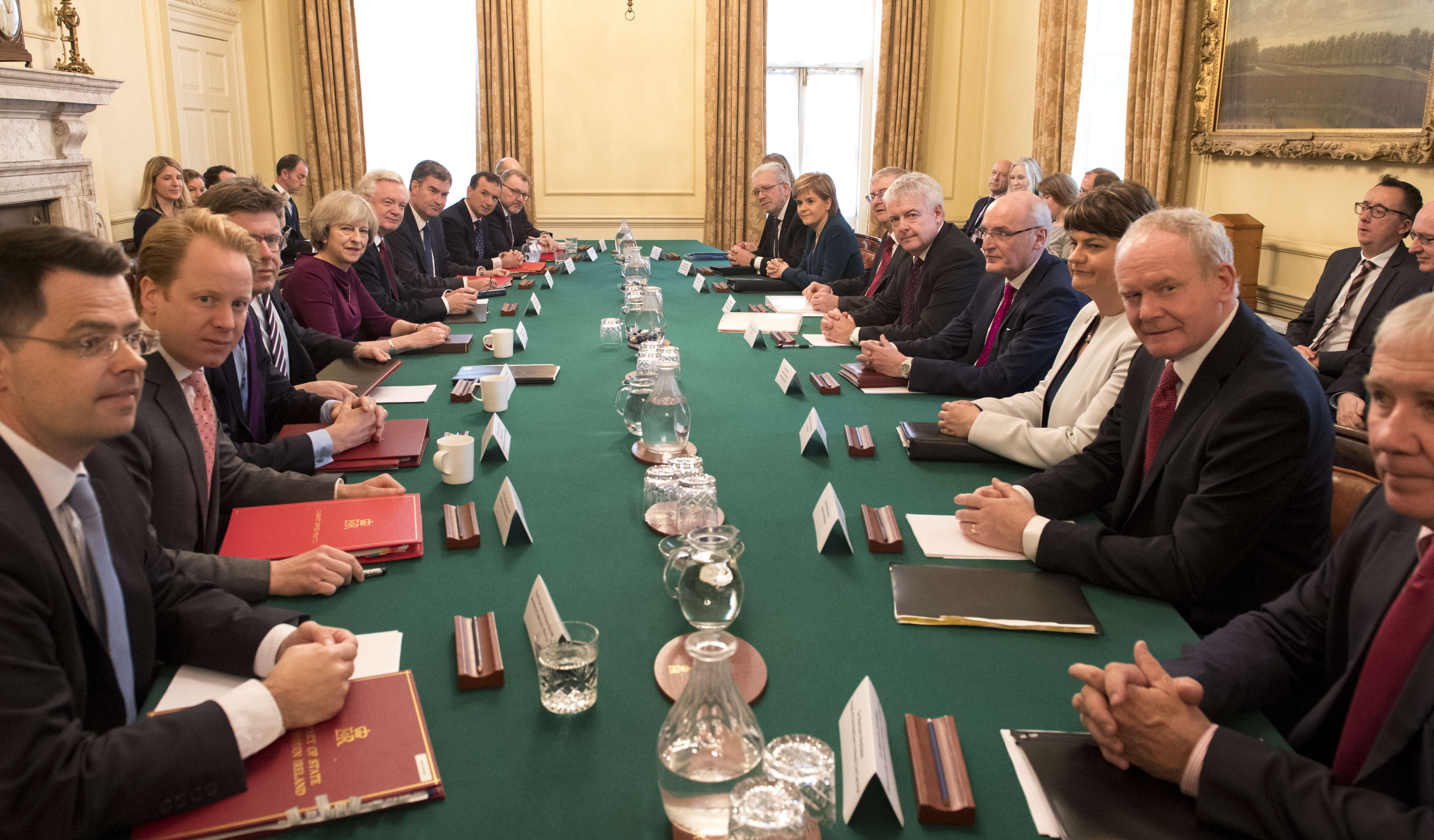
- Meeting of the Joint Ministerial Committee in October 2016
- Abbreviation: JMC
- Successor: Prime Minister and Heads of Devolved Governments Council
- Formation: 1999; 27 years ago
- Dissolved: 10 November 2022; 3 years ago
- Legal status: Joint committee
- Region served: United Kingdom
- Website: Joint Ministerial Committee

The Joint Ministerial Committee was an intergovernmental body in the United Kingdom that brought together the UK prime minister and the heads of the three national devolved governments of Scotland, Northern Ireland and Wales. It was established in 1999 and superseded by the Prime Minister and Heads of Devolved Governments Council in 2022.

== History ==
In 1999, devolved administrations were created in Scotland, Wales, and Northern Ireland by the United Kingdom parliament.

The Joint Ministerial Committee was created in 1999 by Tony Blair's Labour government, and sought to act as a focus for the coordination of the relationships between the four administrations.

== Terms of reference ==
The terms of reference for the JMC were:

- To consider non-devolved matters which impinge on devolved responsibilities, and devolved matters which impinge on non-devolved responsibilities.
- Where the UK government and the devolved administrations so agree, to consider devolved matters if it is beneficial to discuss their respective treatment in different parts of the UK.
- To keep the arrangements for liaison between the UK government and the devolved administrations under review.
- To consider disputes between the administrations.

== Membership ==
Before it was replaced, the membership of the JMC Plenary (JMC(P)) was:

- Prime Minister and Minister for the Union, who acts as chair of the JMC.
- Secretary of State for Housing, Communities and Local Government, Minister for Intergovernmental Relations
- First Minister of Scotland
- First Minister of Wales
- First Minister and Deputy First Minister of Northern Ireland

The following were also permitted to attend sessions of the JMC:

- Deputy Prime Minister of the United Kingdom or First Secretary of State (if in office)
- The Secretary of State for Foreign and Commonwealth Affairs
- The secretaries of state for Scotland, Wales and Northern Ireland.
- Other Secretaries of State when issues relating to their remit are discussed.

== Meetings ==
Since its creation in 1999, there had been several different JMC meeting formats. Since 2010, there have been four types: plenary, Europe, domestic and European negotiations (created following the 2016 United Kingdom European Union membership referendum).

The JMC Plenary meetings were intended to occur at least once every year. However, no plenary meetings were held between 2002 and 2008. This was primarily because the UK, Scotland, and Wales governments were all controlled by the Labour Party, and as such ministers from the central and devolved governments could quickly and easily use informal links to coordinate policy. However, following the Scottish National Party's victory at the 2007 Scottish Parliament election this was no longer the case. So JMC Plenary meetings were re-established, though on an ad hoc basis.

Under proposals outlined by Theresa May in October 2016, the JMC Plenary was to meet on a definite annual basis and would have rotated between London, Edinburgh, Cardiff and Belfast. It would have also published an annual report on its work and hoped to foster greater formal and informal links between ministers from each (devolved) government. However, these proposals were vetoed by Sinn Féin's Martin McGuinness.

The last JMC Plenary was convened by Theresa May on 19 December 2018. Although after he became Prime Minister in July 2019, Boris Johnson announced his intention to hold a JMC Plenary meeting as soon as possible. However, this did not occur, so the 19 December 2018 meeting remained the final plenary.

== See also ==
- Intergovernmental relations in the United Kingdom
- List of current heads of government in the United Kingdom and dependencies
