= Islands Forum (United Kingdom) =

- Formation: September 2022; 4 years ago
- Dissolved: February 2026; 9 months ago
- Purpose: Forum for leaders of local governments of island communities in the United Kingdom
- Region served: United Kingdom

The Islands Forum was a body in the United Kingdom that brought together local government leaders from island communities with ministers from the UK Government, the Scottish Government, the Welsh Government, and the Northern Ireland Executive. It met for the first time in September 2022 and was disbanded in February 2026.

== Background ==
The Island Forum was proposed In 2022, as part of the Levelling Up White Paper to allow local policymakers and residents of island communities to work together on common issues, such as broadband connectivity, and provide a platform for them to communicate directly with the UK central government on the challenges island communities face in terms of the levelling up agenda.

== Members ==
The following governments, local authorities and organisations were members of the Islands Forum:

United Kingdom

- UK Government

England

- Isle of Wight Council
- Council of the Isles of Scilly

Scotland

- Scottish Government
- Argyll and Bute Council
- Highland Council
- North Ayrshire Council
- Orkney Islands Council
- Shetland Islands Council
- Western Isles Council

Wales

- Welsh Government
- Isle of Anglesey County Council

Northern Ireland

- Northern Ireland Executive
- Rathlin Development and Community Association

== Meetings ==
The forum met twice each year:

Meetings of the Islands Forum
Date	Location	Chair
September 2022	Orkney Islands	Nadhim Zahawi
May 2023	Isle of Wight	Michael Gove
10 October 2023	Western Isles	Michael Gove
7-8 May 2024	Anglesey	Michael Gove
Autumn 2024 (cancelled)	Argyll and Bute	N/A

== See also ==
- Intergovernmental relations in the United Kingdom
- Local Government Leaders' Council
