= Prime Minister and Heads of Devolved Governments Council =

Intergovernmental body in the United Kingdom

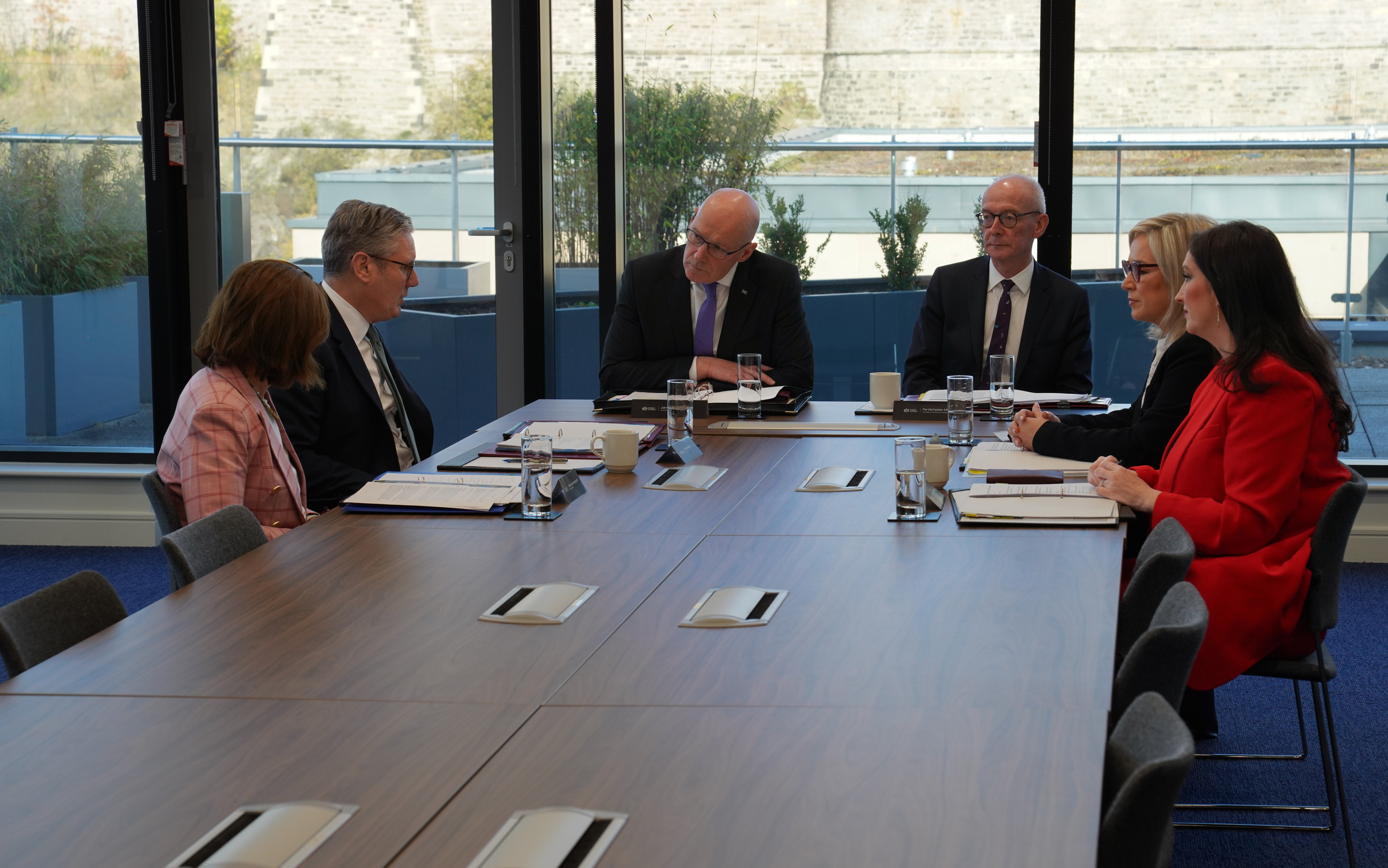
- A meeting of the council in Edinburgh, Scotland, October 2024
- Nickname: The Council
- Predecessor: Joint Ministerial Committee
- Formation: 10 November 2022; 3 years ago
- Legal status: Intergovernmental body
- Region served: United Kingdom
- Members: United Kingdom; Scotland; Wales; Northern Ireland
- Website: Prime Minister and Heads of Devolved Governments Council

The Prime Minister and Heads of Devolved Governments Council (informally referred to as The Council) is an intergovernmental body within the United Kingdom. The council acts as the main body for the heads of governments of the member nations to consider issues of common interests across each country, as well as providing strategic direction for wider intergovernmental relations.

Its membership includes Scotland, Northern Ireland, Wales and the United Kingdom itself, and is attended by the Prime Minister of the United Kingdom, the First Minister of Scotland, the First Minister and deputy First Minister of Northern Ireland and the First Minister of Wales, with other politicians from each of its member nations attending the council if necessary when discussing specific issues, such as economic policy.

== History ==
In 1999, devolved administrations were created in Scotland, Wales, and Northern Ireland by the United Kingdom parliament. Initially a Joint Ministerial Committee system was created in 1999 by Tony Blair's Labour UK government to coordinate relationships between the three new governments and the UK government.

In 2022, following a review into intergovernmental relations in the UK, the present tiered system of governance was put in place. The tiered structure includes a Prime Minister and Heads of Devolved Governments Council as a top tier, portfolio-specific interministerial standing committees as a middle tier, and topic-based intergovernmental groups as the lower tier.

== Operation ==
=== Responsibilities ===
The council is responsible for:

- Discussing UK-level policies that require cooperation.
- Overseeing the other government organisations and mechanisms within the tiers of intergovernmental relations.
- Acting as final arbiter for the UK dispute resolution mechanism.

=== Secretariat ===
The Prime Minister and Heads of Devolved Governments Council consists of a Intergovernmental Relations Secretariat as well as a number of supporting staff who are accountable to all members of the council, rather than to individual governments. The Secretariat acts on an impartial basis and acts equally, meaning all governments represented on the council are equal to each other. All day–to–day business of the council is managed by the Secretariat and senior officials, including the location and dates for meetings of the council.

== Membership ==
The members of the council are the Prime Minister of the United Kingdom, the First Minister of Scotland, the First Minister of Wales and the First and deputy First Ministers of Northern Ireland. Additionally, other ministers from the UK government may participate in meetings of the council, in particular the Minister for Intergovernmental Relations who commonly attends with the Prime Minister. In the absence of a Northern Ireland Executive, officials from the Northern Ireland Civil Service have participated in an observer capacity.

| Government | Representative(s) | Title |
|---|---|---|
| HM Government | Andy Burnham MP | Prime Minister |
| Scottish Government | John Swinney MSP | First Minister |
| Welsh Government | Rhun ap Iorwerth MS | First Minister |
| Northern Ireland Executive | Michelle O'Neill MLA | First Minister |
| Northern Ireland Executive | Emma Little-Pengelly MLA | Deputy First Minister |

== Meetings ==
The council met for the first time in November 2022 chaired by Rishi Sunak. No further meetings were held until after the 2024 United Kingdom general election when newly elected prime minister Keir Starmer convened a meeting in October 2024. Starmer stated that the council would meet again in Spring 2025.

=== List of meetings ===
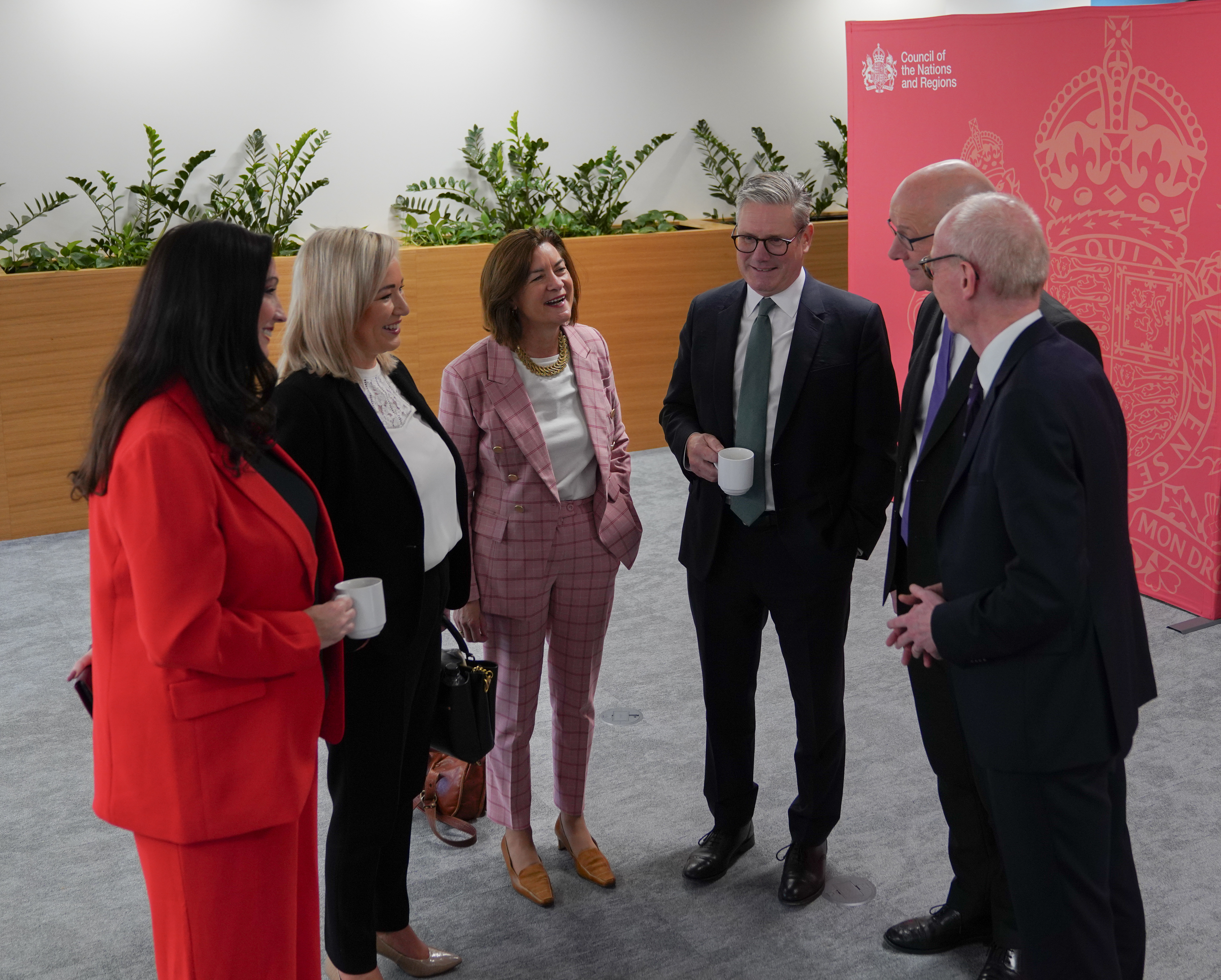
Members of the council in October 2024

Meetings of the Prime Minister and Heads of Devolved Governments Council
| Date | Location | Chair |
|---|---|---|
| 10 November 2022 | Blackpool | Rishi Sunak |
| 11 October 2024 | Edinburgh | Keir Starmer |
| 23 May 2025 | London | Keir Starmer |

== Complementary bodies ==
The Council of the Nations and Regions was established in October 2024. This forum is intended to complement rather than replace the existing system of intergovernmental relations between the UK's four governments.

== See also ==
- Intergovernmental relations in the United Kingdom
- List of current heads of government in the United Kingdom and dependencies
- Council of the Nations and Regions
