= Cabinet Manual =

Cabinet Manual can refer to:

- Cabinet Manual (New Zealand)
- Cabinet Manual (United Kingdom)
