= Intergovernmental relations in the United Kingdom =

UK central and devolved body relations

In the United Kingdom, intergovernmental relations refers to the relationship, cooperation, and engagement between the UK Government, Scottish Government, Welsh Government and Northern Ireland Executive. Since powers were devolved in the late 1990s from the UK Parliament to Scotland, Wales, and Northern Ireland, there have been various bodies and forums to facilitate relations between the four governments and their officials.

The first of these, the Joint Ministerial Committee (JMC), was established in 1999. Its members were primarily the heads of the governments of the United Kingdom, Scotland, Northern Ireland and Wales, as well as some other relevant ministers. The body saw multiple periods where it did not meet for years, such as from 2002–2008, and again from 2018. It was eventually disbanded.

The Prime Minister and Heads of Devolved Governments Council, established in 2022, is the body where the heads of the four governments currently meet. In addition to the Prime Minister and Heads of Devolved Governments Council, portfolio-specific Interministerial Standing Committees (IMSC) and Interministerial Groups (IMG) were established.

== Background ==
In 1999, devolved administrations were created in Scotland, Wales, and Northern Ireland by the United Kingdom parliament.

== Joint Ministerial Committee (1999–2022) ==
The Joint Ministerial Committee was created in 1999 by Tony Blair's Labour government, and sought to act as a focus for the coordination of the relationships between the four administrations. It was established in 1999 and superseded by the Prime Minister and Heads of Devolved Governments Council in 2022.

The membership of the JMC Plenary (JMC(P)) was:

- Prime Minister and Minister for the Union, who acts as chair of the JMC.
- Secretary of State for Housing, Communities and Local Government, Minister for Intergovernmental Relations
- First Minister of Scotland
- First Minister of Wales
- First Minister and Deputy First Minister of Northern Ireland

The following were also permitted to attend sessions of the JMC:

- Deputy Prime Minister of the United Kingdom or First Secretary of State (if in office)
- The Secretary of State for Foreign and Commonwealth Affairs
- The secretaries of state for Scotland, Wales and Northern Ireland.
- Other Secretaries of State when issues relating to their remit are discussed.

== Tiered governance (2022–present) ==
On 20 January 2020, the Constitution Committee within the House of Lords published a report outlining how the UK Government could improve intergovernmental relations. In 2022, the UK Government and devolved governments came to an agreement on the intergovernmental relations in the UK that saw the creation of the tiered governance system.

=== Prime Minister and Heads of Devolved Governments Council ===
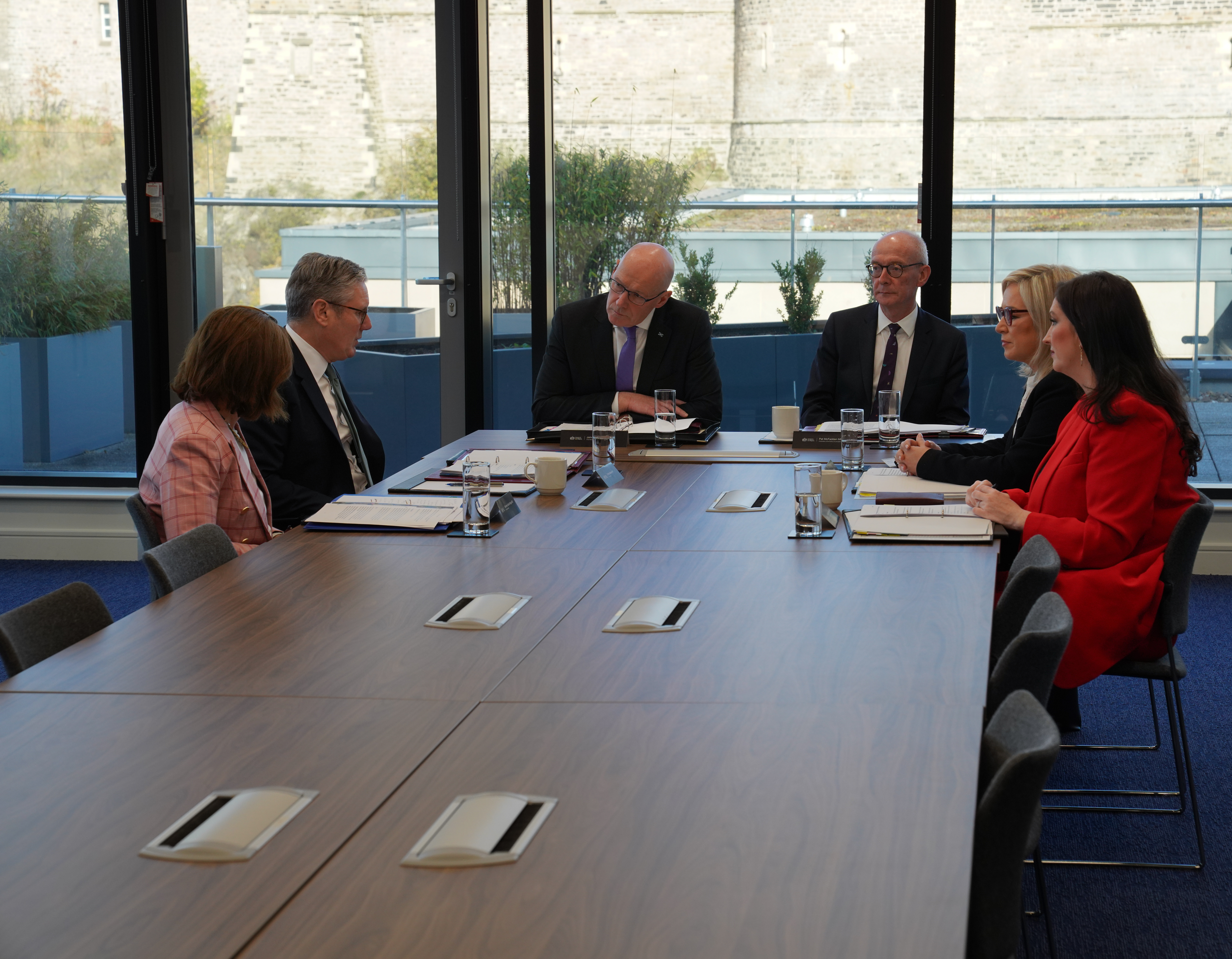
A meeting of the heads of governments of the United Kingdom, Scotland, Northern Ireland and Wales in Edinburgh, October 2024

The Prime Minister and Heads of Devolved Governments Council consists of the Prime Minister of the United Kingdom, the First Minister of Scotland, the First Minister of Wales and the First Minister and deputy First Minister of Northern Ireland.

The council is responsible for:

- Discussing UK-level policies that require cooperation.
- Overseeing the other government organisations and mechanisms within the other tiers.
- Acting as final arbiter for the UK dispute resolution mechanism.

==== Membership ====
Prime Minister and Heads of Devolved Governments Council
Name	Representing	Council Position
Andy Burnham	United Kingdom	Chair
John Swinney	Scotland	Member
Rhun ap Iorwerth	Wales	Member
Michelle O'Neill; Emma Little-Pengelly	Northern Ireland	Member

=== Interministerial Standing Committees ===
The Interministerial Standing Committee is led by the Minister for Intergovernmental Relations and is responsible for discussing areas of cooperation that cannot be discussed at the Portfolio Committee, the committee will have representatives from central government and the three devolved nations and aim to meet monthly.

There are currently two active intergovernmental committees.

No	Name of Interministerial Standing Committee
1.	Interministerial
2.	Finance

=== Interministerial Groups ===
There are currently 7 active intergovernmental groups

No	Name of Intergovernmental Group
1.	Business and Industry
2.	Education
3.	UK-EU Relations
4.	Elections and Registration
5.	Environment, Food, and Rural Affairs
6.	Housing, Communities, and Local Government
7.	COP26

=== Dispute resolution mechanism ===
There are six different mechanisms involved in intergovernmental relations in order to avoid disputes between the UK Government and the devolved governments. Whilst the Scottish Government and Welsh Government welcomed the changes to intergovernmental relations within the United Kingdom which were implemented in 2022, both governments were critical regarding the UK Government's "attitude towards engagement with the devolved administrations at times".

The review into intergovernmental relations concluded that the governments of the United Kingdom, Scotland, Wales and Northern Ireland were “committed to promoting collaboration and the avoidance of disagreements". In any instance that a dispute between any government arises, the IGR Secretariat may have that matter referred to them by the government or governments involved.

The IGR Council is the final arbiter in any disputes.

== Complementary bodies ==
Several other bodies and forums have also been established to enhance relations between national, devolved and local governments in the UK. These bodies are not exclusively intergovernmental, as they include representatives of English strategic authorities and local authorities (which are not governments). They are intended to complement rather than replace the existing tiered system of intergovernmental relations between the UK's four governments.

The Inter-Parliamentary Forum was established in February 2022 to bring together members of the two houses of the UK parliament and the devolved parliaments and assemblies.

The Islands Forum was established in September 2022 to bring together ministers from the UK government and local government leaders from island communities across the UK. It was disbanded in February 2026.

The East–West Council was established in March 2024 as part of the Northern Ireland Executive reformation to improve links between Northern Ireland and rest of the United Kingdom.

The Mayoral Council, an England-only body chaired by the deputy prime minister, brings together ministers from the UK government with the strategic authority mayors. It met for the first time on 10 October 2024 and meets four times a year.

The Council of the Nations and Regions, established by UK prime minister Keir Starmer on 11 October 2024, which brings together the prime minister of the United Kingdom and other ministers from the UK central government with the First Minister of Scotland, First Minister of Wales, First Minister and Deputy First Minister of Northern Ireland and the strategic authority mayors.

The Leaders' Council brings together the deputy prime minister and leaders of representative bodies of local government in the United Kingdom. It met for the first time on 24 October 2024 and is expected to meet four times a year.

== See also ==
- Council of the Nations and Regions, Mayoral Council for England
- British–Irish Council, North/South Ministerial Council, East–West Council, UK–Overseas Territories Joint Ministerial Council
- Interparliamentary Forum, British–Irish Parliamentary Assembly, North/South Inter-Parliamentary Association
- Minister for Intergovernmental Relations
- Executive federalism
- Membership of the countries of the United Kingdom in international organisations
- List of current heads of government in the United Kingdom and dependencies
