= First Secretary of State =

Senior ministerial office of the United Kingdom

United Kingdom First Secretary of State of the United Kingdom of Great Britain and Northern Ireland
- Royal Arms of His Majesty's Government

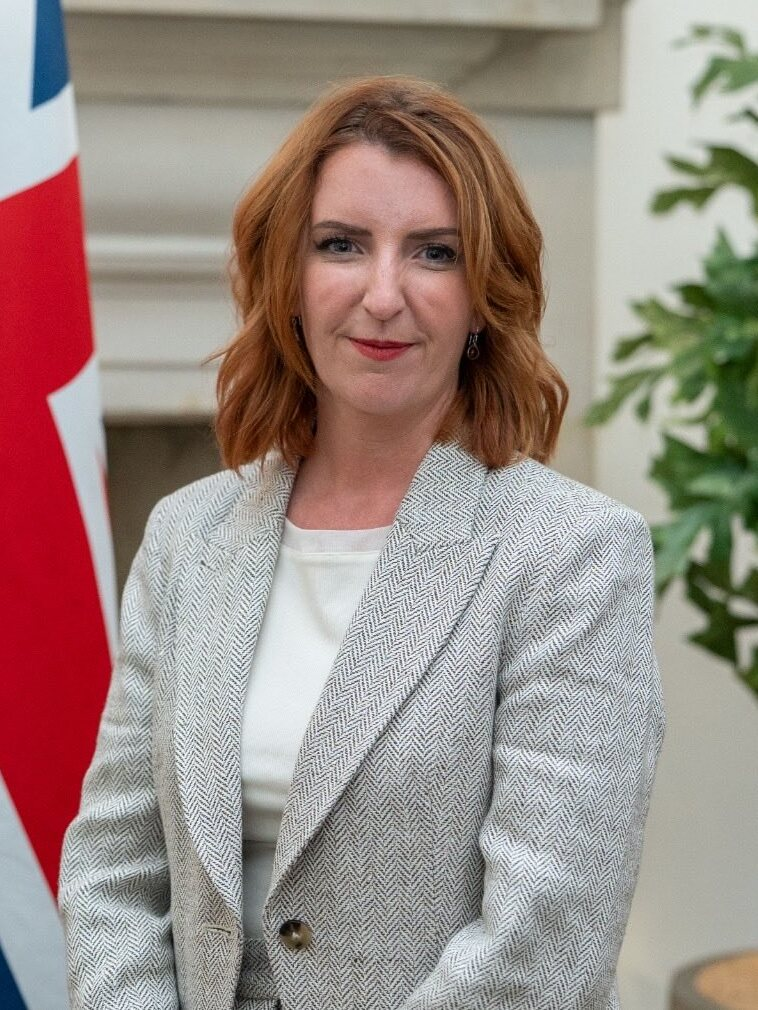
- Incumbent; Louise Haigh since 20 July 2026
- Government of the United Kingdom; Cabinet Office
- Style: The Right Honourable (formal); First Secretary (informal); Her Excellency (diplomatic)
- Member of: Cabinet; Privy Council; National Security Council
- Reports to: Prime Minister
- Residence: None, may use grace and favour residences
- Nominator: Prime Minister
- Appointer: The King (on the advice of the prime minister)
- Term length: At His Majesty's pleasure
- Inaugural holder: Rab Butler
- Formation: 13 July 1962; 64 years ago
- Salary: £153,022 per annum (including £81,932 MP salary) (2019)
- Website: www.gov.uk/government/ministers/first-secretary-of-state

First Secretary of State is an office that is sometimes held by a minister of the Crown in the Government of the United Kingdom held by the most senior secretary of state. The office is not always in use, but is usually the designated deputy of the prime minister making them the second highest ranking minister, unless a Deputy Prime Minister has been appointed.

The office frequently serves the same political functions as that of Deputy Prime Minister, and while there have been occasions when the two titles have existed at the same time, Prime Ministers historically have tended to designate one or the other (or neither). As of July 2026, the office is held by Louise Haigh, last having been held by Dominic Raab from 2019 to 2021, which ended when the title was swapped for Deputy Prime Minister in 2021.

== Constitutional position ==
Like the deputy prime minister, the first secretary enjoys no right of automatic succession to the office of Prime Minister. When Prime Minister Boris Johnson was moved to an intensive care unit on 6 April 2020, after contracting COVID-19, First Secretary Dominic Raab was asked "to deputise for him where necessary."

The office temporarily enjoyed some greater constitutional footing between when it was incorporated as a corporation sole in 2002 and having all of its remaining functions transferred in 2008. During most of this time, John Prescott was First Secretary.

== History ==
In 1962, R.A. Butler was the first person to be appointed to the office, in part to avoid earlier royal objections to the office of Deputy Prime Minister. The office gave Butler ministerial superiority over the rest of the Cabinet and indicated that he was second-in-command. Harold Wilson appointed three people to the office between 1964 and 1970, but it has been noted by Anthony Seldon et al. that the office may have caught on "more as an ego-massager than for functional reasons."

Later, Michael Heseltine and John Prescott held the office and also that of Deputy Prime Minister. The two offices have only existed concurrently with different holders in David Cameron's coalition government, in which Liberal Democrat Leader Nick Clegg was appointed Deputy Prime Minister while Conservative William Hague was First Secretary.

== Responsibilities ==
The gov.uk website states the offices responsibilities as.

- Delivery of the Prime Minister’s priorities
- No10 North
- Oversight of all Cabinet Office policy
- Coordination and delivery of cross-government priorities
- Procurement and Commercial
- Oversight of national security policy coordination
- Oversight of state reform and Civil Service reform

Additionally, Lord Norton says that there are two benefits to a prime minister in appointing a first secretary: firstly, it leaves a senior minister free to perform correlation and co-ordination and to chair committees and, secondly, it enables the prime minister to send a signal as to the status of the holder. Stephen Thornton and Jonathan Kirkup have said that "the Office of First Secretary of State is only as important as the person holding that office is perceived to be important", but in certain circumstances the office "can assume acute importance and real power" and it may yet become an office of substance.

== List of First Secretaries of State ==
First Secretary of State	Term of office		Duration	Other ministerial offices	Party	Ministry
Rab Butler; MP for Saffron Walden	13 July 1962	18 October 1963	1 year, 98 days		Conservative	Macmillan II
Office vacant	18 October 1963	16 October 1964	365 days			
George Brown; MP for Belper	16 October 1964	11 August 1966	1 year, 300 days	Secretary of State for Economic Affairs	Labour	Wilson (I & II)
Michael Stewart; MP for Fulham	11 August 1966	6 April 1968	1 year, 240 days	Secretary of State for Economic Affairs (Note: Served as Secretary of State for Economic Affairs until August 1967); Secretary of State for Foreign and Commonwealth Affairs (Note: Secretary of State for Foreign and Commonwealth Affairs from March 1968)	Labour	Wilson (I & II)
Barbara Castle; MP for Blackburn	6 April 1968	19 June 1970	2 years, 75 days	Secretary of State for Employment and Productivity	Labour	Wilson (I & II)
Office vacant	19 June 1970	20 July 1995	25 years, 32 days			
Michael Heseltine; MP for Henley	20 July 1995	2 May 1997	1 year, 287 days	Deputy Prime Minister	Conservative	Major II
Office vacant	2 May 1997	8 June 2001	4 years, 38 days			
John Prescott; MP for Kingston upon Hull East	8 June 2001	27 June 2007	6 years, 20 days	Deputy Prime Minister (Note: from May 1997); Secretary of State for Local Government and the Regions (Note: between 29 May 2002 and 5 May 2006)	Labour	Blair II
John Prescott; MP for Kingston upon Hull East	8 June 2001	27 June 2007	6 years, 20 days	Deputy Prime Minister; Secretary of State for Local Government and the Regions	Labour	Blair III
Office vacant	27 June 2007	5 June 2009	1 year, 344 days			
Peter Mandelson, Baron Mandelson	5 June 2009	11 May 2010	341 days	Lord President of the Council; Secretary of State for Business, Innovation and Skills; President of the Board of Trade	Labour	Brown
William Hague; MP for Richmond (Yorks)	12 May 2010	8 May 2015	4 years, 362 days	Secretary of State for Foreign and Commonwealth Affairs (Note: Served as Secretary of State for Foreign and Commonwealth Affairs until July 2014); Leader of the House of Commons (Note: Served as Leader of the House of Commons from July 2014)	Conservative	Cameron–Clegg (Con.–L.D.)
George Osborne; MP for Tatton	8 May 2015	13 July 2016	1 year, 67 days	Chancellor of the Exchequer	Conservative	Cameron II
Office vacant	13 July 2016	11 June 2017	334 days			
Damian Green; MP for Ashford	11 June 2017	20 December 2017	193 days	Minister for the Cabinet Office	Conservative	May II
Office vacant	20 December 2017	24 July 2019	1 year, 217 days			
Dominic Raab; MP for Esher and Walton	24 July 2019	15 September 2021	2 years, 54 days	Secretary of State for Foreign and Commonwealth Affairs (Note: Secretary of State for Foreign and Commonwealth Affairs until September 2020); Secretary of State for Foreign, Commonwealth and Development Affairs (Note: Secretary of State for Foreign, Commonwealth and Development Affairs from September 2020)	Conservative	Johnson (I & II)
Office vacant	15 September 2021	20 July 2026	4 years, 309 days			
Louise Haigh; MP for Sheffield Heeley; First secretaryship	20 July 2026	Incumbent	118 days	Chancellor of the Duchy of Lancaster; Minister for the Cabinet Office	Labour	Burnham

== See also ==
- Ministerial ranking – the "pecking order" or relative importance of senior ministers in the UK government.
- Deputy Prime Minister of the United Kingdom, a similar position, sometimes used as an alternative to the First Secretary
