= Minister for Intergovernmental Relations =

Senior ministerial position in the Government of the United Kingdom

United Kingdom Minister for Intergovernmental Relations
- Royal Arms of His Majesty's Government

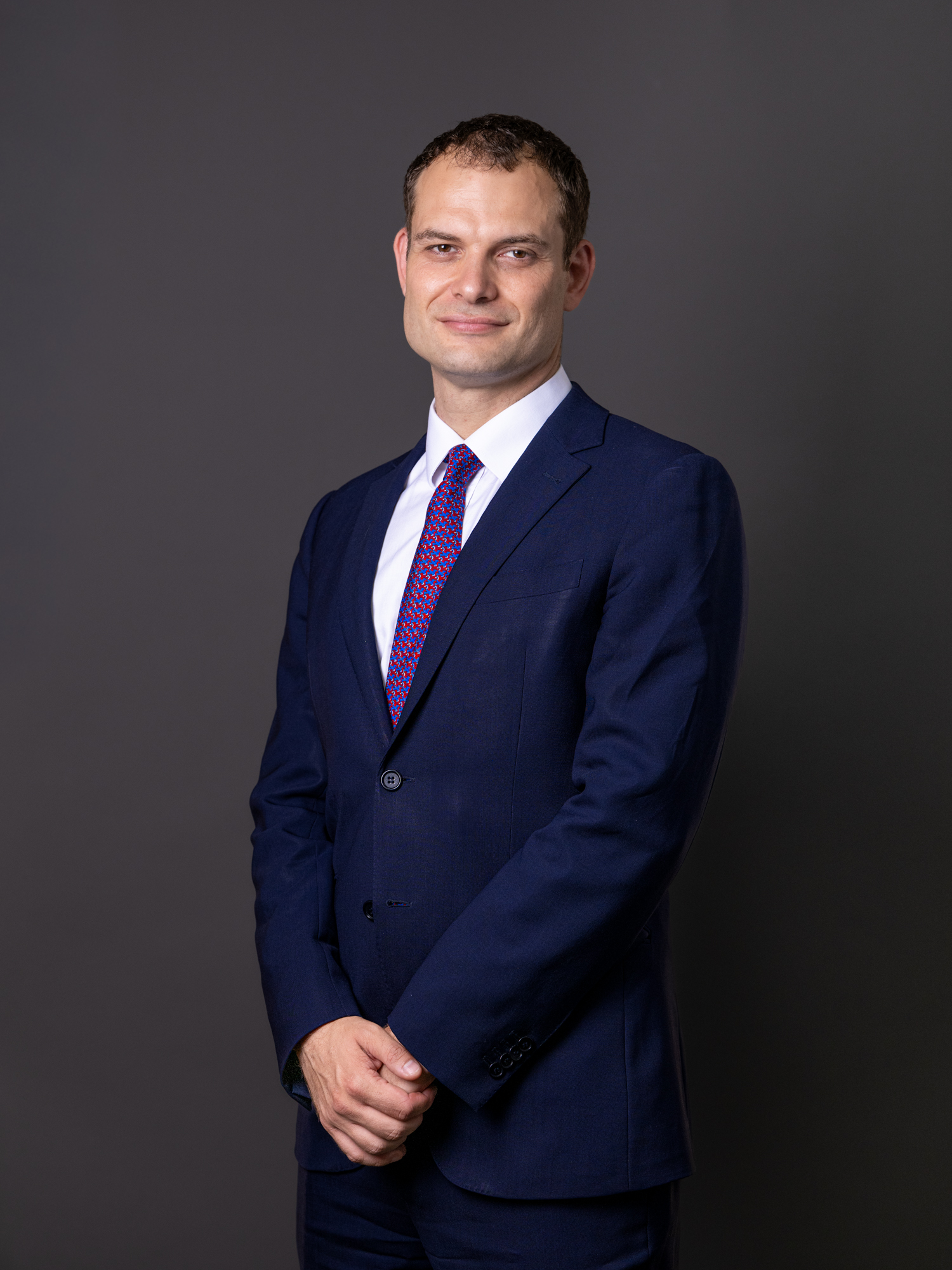
- Incumbent; Hamish Falconer since 20 July 2026
- Cabinet Office; Foreign, Commonwealth and Development Office
- Member of: UK Government; Prime Minister and Heads of Devolved Governments Council
- Seat: Westminster, London
- Appointer: Monarch
- Term length: At His Majesty's pleasure
- Inaugural holder: Michael Gove
- Formation: 18 September 2021; 4 years ago
- Website: www.gov.uk/government/ministers/minister-of-state-minister-for-intergovernmental-relations-and-european-relations

The Minister for Intergovernmental Relations is a ministerial position for the intergovernmental relations in the United Kingdom. It was created by Boris Johnson in the second substantive reshuffle of his second government for Michael Gove, who was also the newly appointed Secretary of State for Levelling Up. The post was vacant from the 6 July 2022 until the appointment of Nadhim Zahawi on 6 September 2022.

Hamish Falconer became minister for Intergovernmental relations on 20 July 2026.

== Responsibilities ==
In the launch of the renamed Department for Levelling Up, Housing and Communities, the Minister for Intergovernmental Relations is described to be spearheading coordination with the Territorial Offices and the devolved governments of Scotland, Wales and Northern Ireland on the Prime Minister's (and Minister for the Union's) behalf.

== List of ministers ==
Minister	Term of office		Concurrent office(s)	Party	Ministry
Minister for Intergovernmental Relations
Michael Gove	18 September 2021	6 July 2022	Secretary of State for Levelling Up, Housing and Communities	Conservative	Johnson (II)
Nadhim Zahawi	6 September 2022	25 October 2022	Chancellor of the Duchy of Lancaster; Minister for Equalities	Conservative	Truss
Michael Gove	25 October 2022	5 July 2024	Secretary of State for Levelling Up, Housing and Communities	Conservative	Sunak
Pat McFadden	5 September 2024	6 September 2025	Chancellor of the Duchy of Lancaster	Labour	Starmer
Darren Jones	6 September 2025	20 July 2026	Chancellor of the Duchy of Lancaster; Chief Secretary to the Prime Minister	Labour	Starmer
Hamish Falconer	20 July 2026	Incumbent	Minister for European Relations	Labour	Burnham
