= Minister for the Union =

Ministerial position in the Government of the United Kingdom

United Kingdom Minister for the Union
- Royal Arms of His Majesty's Government

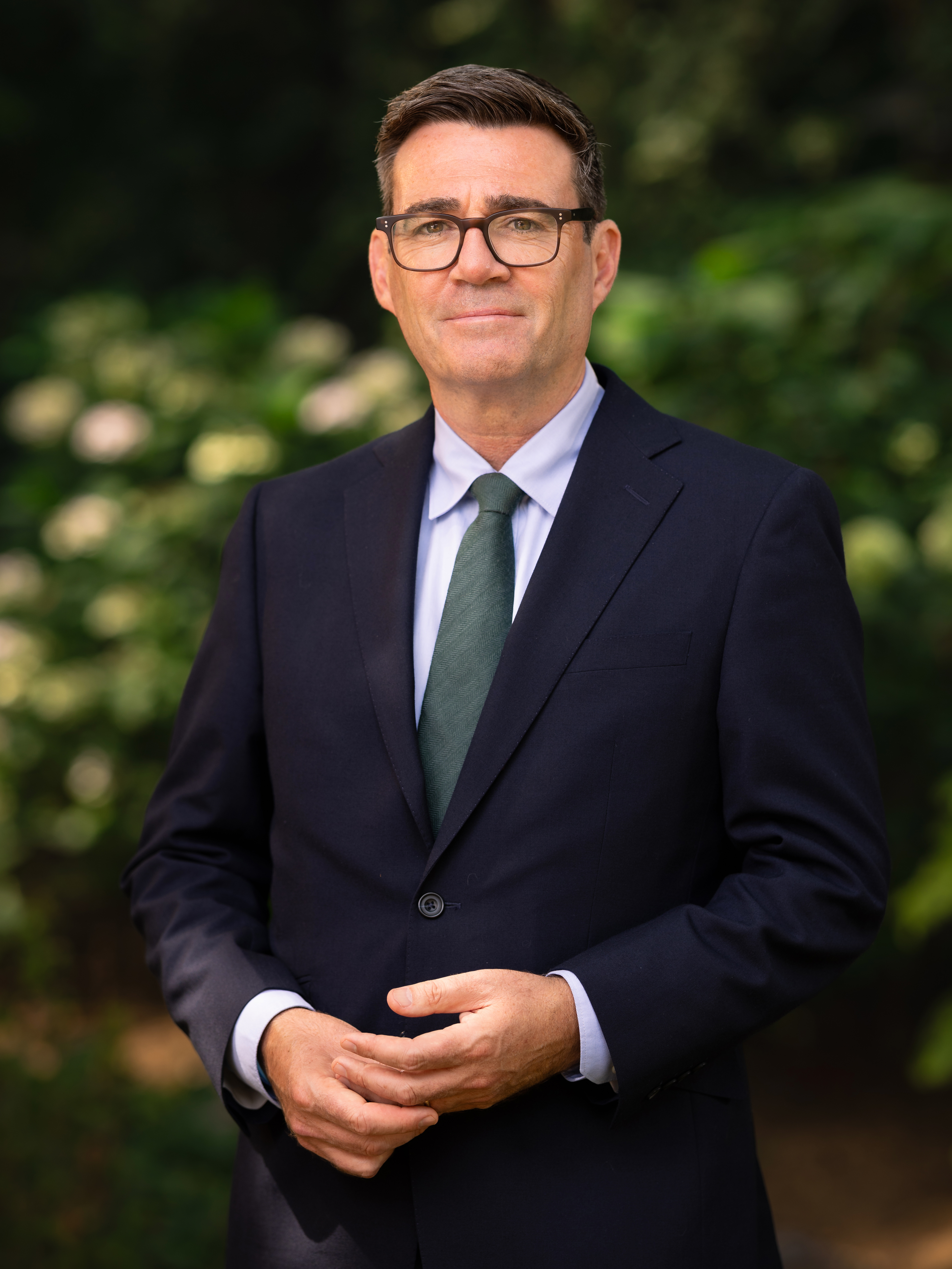
- Incumbent; Andy Burnham since 20 July 2026
- Seat: Westminster, London
- Appointer: Monarch
- Term length: At His Majesty's pleasure
- Inaugural holder: Boris Johnson
- Formation: 26 July 2019; 7 years ago
- Deputy: Minister for Intergovernmental Relations

The minister for the union is a position in the United Kingdom which is held concurrently with the post of Prime Minister.

== History ==
The position was created by Boris Johnson during his first ministry, to be held concurrently with the duties of prime minister. (Note: Minister for the Union is distinct from the office of PM; it is listed separately from Prime Minister and its ex officio titles of First Lord of the Treasury and Minister for the Civil Service.) Johnson proposed the position during the 2019 Conservative Party leadership campaign. He was the first prime minister to adopt the title, and the post was retained by Johnson in his second ministry, and by subsequent prime ministers.

On 4 September 2019, the Government announced £10 million in funding to support the Prime Minister's work as Minister for the Union.

== Responsibilities ==
Since September 2020, the stated responsibilities of the position have been: "As Minister for the Union, the Prime Minister works to ensure that all of government is acting on behalf of the entire United Kingdom: England, Northern Ireland, Scotland, and Wales." Before that point, the government website did not show any responsibilities associated with the position.

== List of ministers ==
#	Portrait	Name	Took office	Left office	Term length	Party	Cabinet	Ref
1		Boris Johnson	26 July 2019	6 September 2022	3 years and 43 days	Conservative	Johnson I	
1		Boris Johnson	26 July 2019	6 September 2022	3 years and 43 days	Conservative	Johnson II	
2		Liz Truss	6 September 2022	25 October 2022	50 days	Conservative	Truss	
3		Rishi Sunak	25 October 2022	5 July 2024	1 year and 255 days	Conservative	Sunak	
4		Keir Starmer	5 July 2024	20 July 2026	2 years and 16 days	Labour	Starmer	
5		Andy Burnham	20 July 2026	Incumbent	57 days	Labour Co-op	Burnham	

== Reception ==
A spokesperson for Johnson stated that the office was intended to emphasise his commitment to strengthening the bond between the countries of the United Kingdom. In July 2019, the title was described as a "cynical rebranding" by Kirsty Blackman, deputy leader of the Scottish National Party in the House of Commons from 2017 to 2020, who advocates Scottish independence. During the COVID-19 pandemic in July 2020, Mark Drakeford, the First Minister of Wales and leader of Welsh Labour, drew attention to Johnson's lack of contact with the Welsh Government, saying: "If you are minister for the union, speaking to the component parts of the union seems to me a sensible way of discharging those responsibilities."

== Related proposals ==
Robert Hazell has suggested merging the offices of Secretary of State for Northern Ireland, Scotland and Wales into one Secretary of State for the Union, in a department into which Rodney Brazier has suggested adding a Minister of State for England with responsibility for English local government.
