= Oxford Union =

UK debating society

Coordinates: 51°45′11″N 1°15′35″W

Oxford Union Society
- Badge of the Oxford Union
- Formation: 1823
- Type: Student debating union
- Headquarters: Oxford, England
- Location: Frewin Court, Oxford, OX1 3JB
- President: Gareth Lim Yefeng (St Peter's College)
- Affiliations: World Universities Debating Council
- Website: oxford-union.org

The Oxford Union Society is a debating society in the city of Oxford, England, whose membership is drawn primarily from the University of Oxford. Founded in 1823, it is one of Britain's oldest university unions and is widely considered as one of the world's most prestigious private students' societies. The Oxford Union exists independently from the university and is distinct from the Oxford University Student Union.

The Oxford Union has a tradition of hosting some of the world's most prominent individuals across politics, academia, and popular culture ranging from Albert Einstein and Elton John to Sir Winston Churchill, Ronald Reagan, Queen Elizabeth II and Mahathir Mohamad. Many former presidents of the Union have gone on to hold high office in the UK and the Commonwealth including William Gladstone, Ted Heath, Boris Johnson, and Benazir Bhutto.

== History and status ==
=== Genesis ===
The Oxford Union was founded as the United Debating Society, an independent forum for unrestricted debate by junior members of Oxford University in 1823. At the time, the university prohibited junior members from discussing certain issues, such as matters of theology. Although restrictions of speech within the university have since been lifted, the Oxford Union has remained separate from and independent of the university and is constitutionally bound to remain so.

The first meeting of the society was held illegally in a room in Peckwater Quad at Christ Church. The first recorded debate was about Parliamentarianism vs Royalism during the English Civil War. By the late 1820s, the Oxford Union was established enough to have regular elections, a growing collection of books, and formalised relations with its sister society The Cambridge Union. In the early 1830s, the Union held its first debate on having confidence in HM Government, a tradition that is continued to this day. As the society developed, it bought a plot of land by Frewin Court in central Oxford and commissioned Benjamin Woodward, who was then working on the University Museum, to design new buildings for the society's use. These initial buildings opened in 1857, included the original debating chamber. By the 1870s, the society had grown too large for the chamber and commissioned a new chamber by Alfred Waterhouse. Finished in 1878 and opened the following year, the Union's new Debating Chamber was the largest purpose-built debating chamber in the world. The original chamber became the society's library and is now home to over 60,000 volumes. A further period of building began in the early 1900s when an extension was built between the Steward's House and the main premises of the society.

=== Status ===
The Oxford Union is an unincorporated association; its property is held in trust in favour of its objectives and members, and governed by its rules (which form a multipartite contract between the members). Its members are almost exclusively drawn from the University of Oxford with some provision for members who are resident in Oxford or attend Oxford Brookes University.

=== Female members ===
Until 1963, women were excluded from membership of the Oxford Union. The admission of women to the Union required a 2/3 vote of its voting past and current members. The first vote to admit women failed, with 903 men voting to admit women and 459 voting against. The second vote, on 9 February 1963, succeeded, 1,039 to 427. Oxford student Judith Okely, who had led the campaign to admit women, then became the first woman member. Geraldine Jones of St Hugh's College was in 1967 the first woman to be elected President of the Oxford Union.

== Notable debates ==
=== 1933: King and Country debate ===
The Oxford Union has long associated itself with freedom of speech, most famously by debating and passing the motion "That this House would under no circumstances fight for its King and country" in 1933. The debate polarised opinion across the country, with the Daily Telegraph running an article headlined "DISLOYALTY AT OXFORD: GESTURE TOWARDS THE REDS".

Several prominent union members (including Randolph Churchill) tried to expunge this motion and the result of the debate from the union's minute book. This attempt was defeated in a meeting more attended than the original debate. Sir Edward Heath records in his memoirs that Churchill was then chased around Oxford by undergraduates who intended to debag him (i.e., humiliate him by removing his trousers), and was then fined by the police for being illegally parked.

=== 1964: Extremism debate ===
In 1964, the Oxford Union invited American civil rights activist Malcolm X to speak on the motion, "This House Believes Extremism in Defence of Liberty is no Vice; Moderation in the Pursuit of Justice is no Virtue".

=== 1975: EEC membership debate ===
On 3 June 1975, two days before the referendum on remaining in the European Communities, BBC1 televised A Question of Europe, a live debate hosted by the union on the motion "That this House Would Say Yes to Europe" with former Conservative Prime Minister Edward Heath and Liberal Party leader Jeremy Thorpe speaking in favour and Labour ministers Barbara Castle and Peter Shore against.

=== 1985: Nuclear armament debate ===
In 1985, David Lange, prime minister of New Zealand, debated against the American evangelist Jerry Falwell the motion "This House Believes Nuclear Weapons are Morally Indefensible." Lange was invited to the debate by New Zealander Jeya Wilson, who was later elected president of the union.

=== 2024: Kashmir independence debate ===
On 14 November 2024, the Oxford Union hosted a debate on the motion "This House Believes in the Independent State of Kashmir". The debate drew controversy in Indian media and protests outside the Union, including criticism of the motion's implications for the territorial integrity of India.

During the debate, a member interrupted proceedings and accused Union president Ebrahim Osman-Mowafy of being "a Pakistani stooge"; a motion of no confidence was subsequently brought against him in connection with the debate. In response to the criticism, the Union issued a statement emphasising its commitment to free speech and intellectual exchange, stating: "We believe that debates should challenge ideas, engage with difficult subjects, and allow for the free expression of all viewpoints". The no-confidence motion against Osman-Mowafy was unsuccessful. The motion for the debate was carried by 207 votes to 108.

=== 2025: Israel–Palestine debate ===
In November 2024, the Union under president Ebrahim Osman-Mowafy, hosted the debate "This House Believes Israel is an Apartheid State Responsible for Genocide", voting for the motion by a margin of 278 to 59. The debate triggered scrutiny for many months afterwards, and was the subject of media attention, with debate on the motion reaching the House of Commons. The debate was compared to the 1933 King and Country debate. Susan Abulhawa spoke as a member of a team in favour of the proposition together with Miko Peled and Mohammed El-Kurd. The Oxford Union later deleted the original recording of Abulhawa's speech on YouTube and uploaded a censored version. Abulhawa responded that the Union seemed to have yielded to demands from Zionists "as Palestinians struggle to make our voices heard in the midst of a genocide". The Union's trustees threatened to remove OUS from the Frewin Court buildings if they uploaded Abulhawa's the full speech, before the standing committee defied the trustees' threat and voted to upload Abulhawa's speech in full. Abulhawa's speech remains available to watch on the Union's YouTube channel.

== Notable speakers ==
Notable speakers

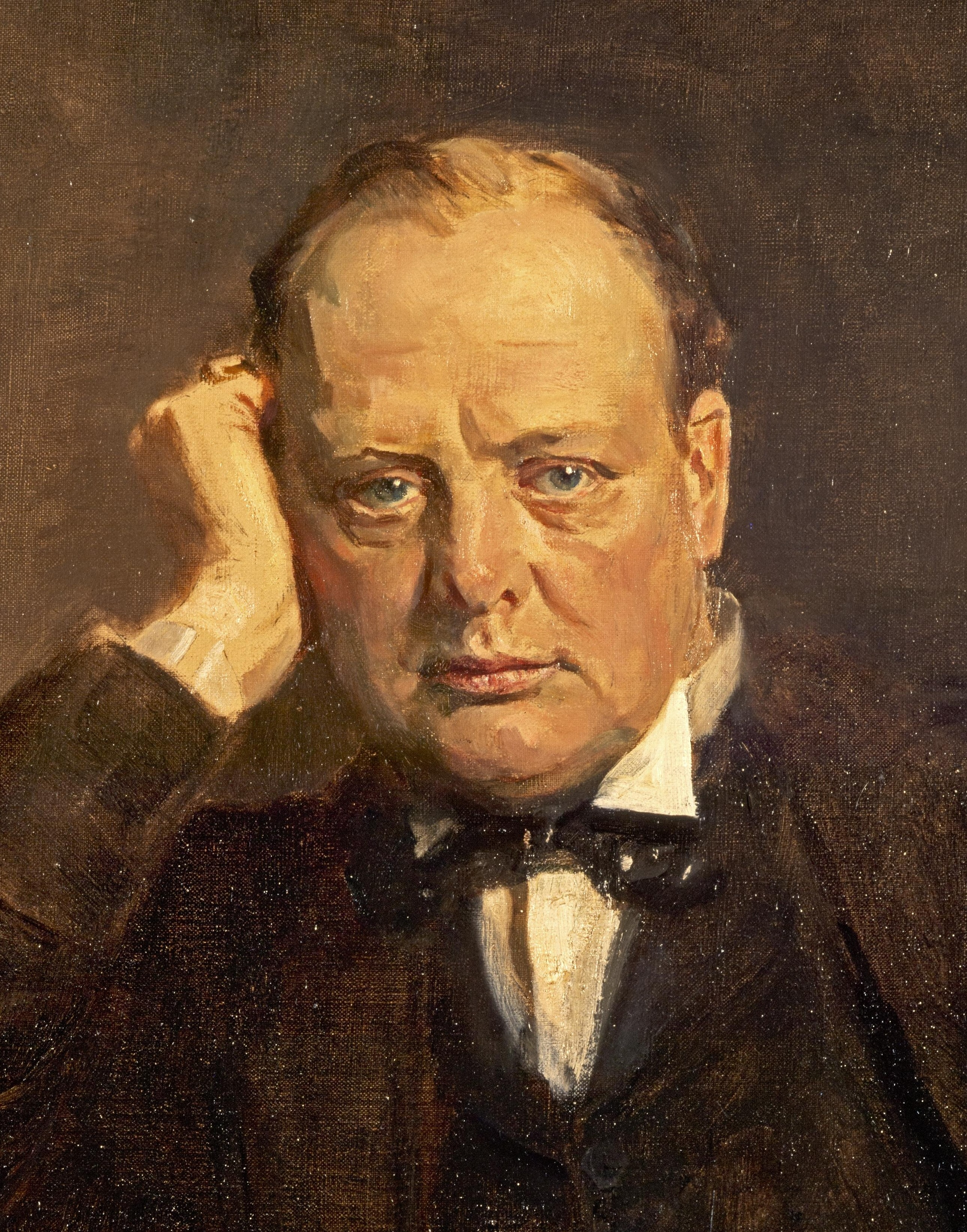
Winston Churchill, Prime Minister of the United Kingdom

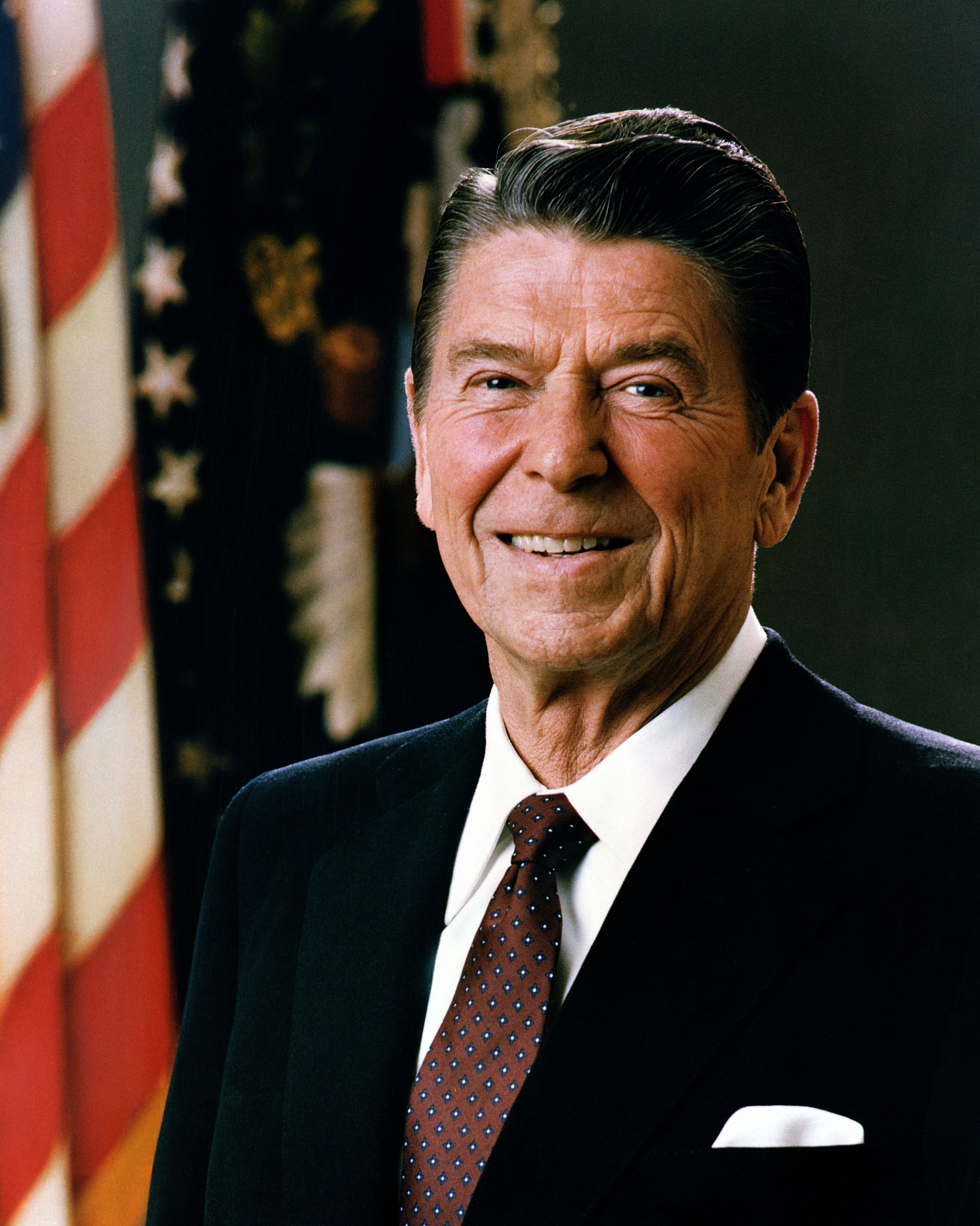
Ronald Reagan, 40th President of the United States

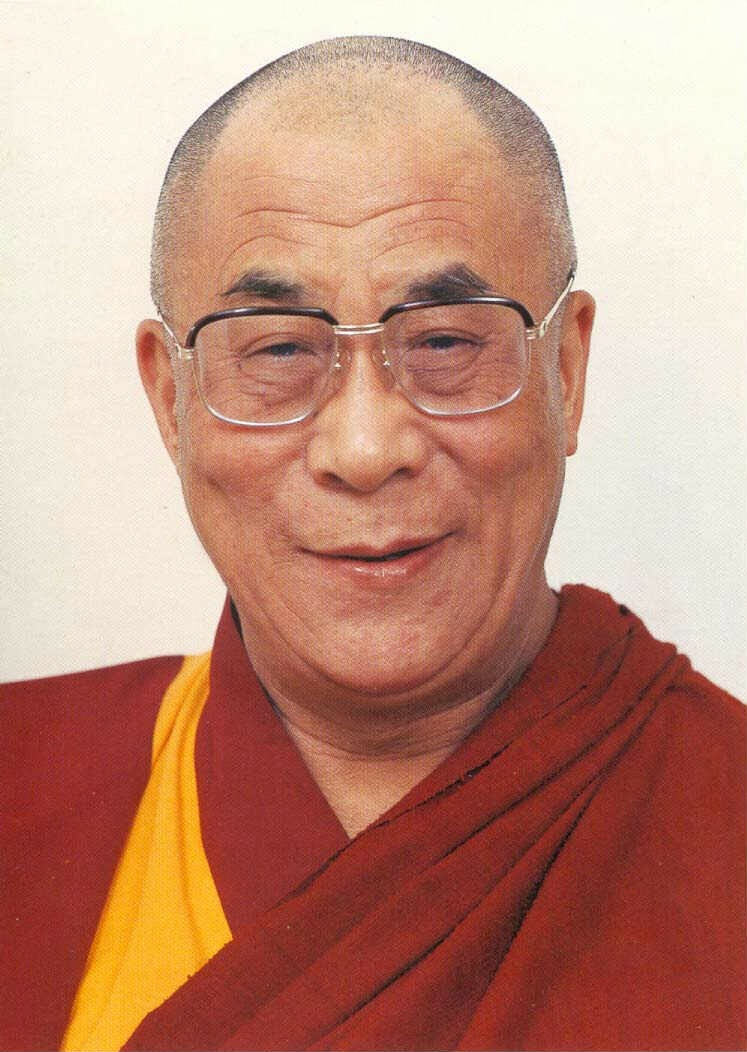
The 14th Dalai Lama

The Union puts on a wide variety of events for its members but is best known for its Thursday night debates and individual speaker events. In both of these, leading figures from public life are invited to discuss something of interest to the membership. Amongst the earliest individual addresses made to the Union were speeches given by Lord Randolph Churchill at the start of the 20th century, and Millicent Fawcett, who became the first woman to address the Oxford Union in 1908.

Since then notable speakers to have addressed the members of the Oxford Union include:

- Queen Elizabeth II
- UK prime ministers Herbert Asquith, David Lloyd George, Neville Chamberlain, Winston Churchill, Clement Attlee, Harold Macmillan, Ted Heath, Margaret Thatcher, John Major, Gordon Brown, David Cameron, Theresa May, and Boris Johnson
- US presidents Ronald Reagan, Jimmy Carter, Bill Clinton and Richard Nixon
- US vice president Mike Pence
- US secretaries of state Henry Kissinger, Madeleine Albright, John Kerry, and Colin Powell
- Several US senators, including Robert Kennedy, Bernie Sanders, and John McCain
- Speakers of the US House of Representatives Nancy Pelosi, Newt Gingrich, and Kevin McCarthy
- French president François Hollande
- Colombian presidents Iván Duque and Álvaro Uribe
- Ecuadorian presidents Guillermo Lasso and Jamil Mahuad
- Russian prime minister Mikhail Kasyanov
- The first prime minister of India Jawaharlal Nehru
- Malaysian prime minister Mahathir Mohamad
- Pakistani prime minister Benazir Bhutto
- Chief adviser of Bangladesh and Nobel Peace Prize winner Muhammad Yunus
- Peruvian prime minister Beatriz Merino
- Libyan leader Muammar al-Gaddafi
- The 14th Dalai Lama Tenzin Gyatso
- German chancellor Helmut Kohl
- French presidential candidate Marine Le Pen
- American athlete O. J. Simpson
- Nobel Peace Prize winners F. W. de Klerk, Lech Wałęsa, Malala Yousafzai, Desmond Tutu, Yasser Arafat and Mother Teresa
- Australian prime ministers Malcolm Turnbull, Tony Abbott, Kevin Rudd, Paul Keating, Scott Morrison and Bob Hawke
- New Zealand prime ministers John Key, David Lange, and Mike Moore
- Scientists, including Albert Einstein, Buzz Aldrin, Richard Dawkins and Stephen Hawking
- Musicians, including Elton John, Billy Joel, Michael Jackson, Shakira, James Blunt, Jacob Collier, Alan Menken and Howard Shore
- Actors, including Morgan Freeman, Tom Hanks, Judi Dench, Bryan Cranston, Ian McKellen, Emma Watson, Clint Eastwood and Roger Moore
- Activists, including Tommy Robinson and Zander Moricz
- Political commentators Ben Shapiro, Mehdi Hasan, Jordan Peterson, Katie Hopkins, Hasan Piker, Shashi Tharoor, Douglas Murray and Charlie Kirk

== Membership ==
Membership of the Oxford Union falls into four classes: life membership, long-term membership, temporary membership, and residential membership. Temporary membership can take four forms: course-length membership, termly membership, visiting membership, and (confusingly) permanent membership. The overwhelming majority of members are life members; the criterion for membership is being a fully matriculated member of the University of Oxford or a member of one of the Union's "kindred societies", namely:

- Cambridge Union
- Durham Union
- Conference Olivant
- Trinity College, Dublin's University Philosophical Society
- Yale Political Union
- Harvard Political Union
- Cornell Political Union

All those eligible for life membership can instead apply for long-term membership for a period of at least the duration of their course. Shorter membership is also extended to staff members of the University of Oxford or of any of its colleges or permanent private halls. Members of a number of other institutions, together with those participating in some visiting study programmes in Oxford, are also eligible to apply for temporary membership.

Guests staying at the Oxford Union Society/Landmark Trust flat in the Old Steward's House are deemed to be visiting members of the Society for the duration of their stay in the flat. Residential memberships are available to Oxford residents who are not from the university, but only if they are deemed worthy by a full meeting of the Union's Standing Committee after submitting a written application to the Secretary and subsequent interview by a member of the Standing Committee.

== The union buildings ==
The Oxford Union buildings are located in Frewin Court (off Cornmarket Street) and on St Michael's Street, and are owned by a separate charitable trust, the Oxford Literary and Debating Union Trust ("OLDUT").

=== OLDUT ===
The Oxford Union was never financially secure and had a significant level of historic debt associated with the erection of its buildings. Following a particularly bad period in the 1970s, the union buildings were sold to OLDUT (the Oxford Literary and Debating Union Trust), and the Oxford Union Society was granted a licence to occupy the building.

Several parts of what were historically the union buildings and grounds were subsequently either sold or made the subject of long leases, including an area of land around the rear of the debating chamber, part of the Union cellars (adjoining that now occupied by the LGBTQ+ venue Plush), and part of what was formerly the Steward's house (now occupied by the Landmark Trust).

The creation of OLDUT secured the future of the union's buildings such that even if the Oxford Union Society were to cease to be or fail financially the buildings would not be lost. OLDUT's principal sources of funds are private donations and grant funding (including from the Mitsubishi UFJ Trust Oxford Foundation), rent on investment property and hiring fees. OLDUT uses these funds to provide financial support for the refurbishment and maintenance of the Union buildings and the operation of the Union's library and reading-rooms.

=== Buildings ===
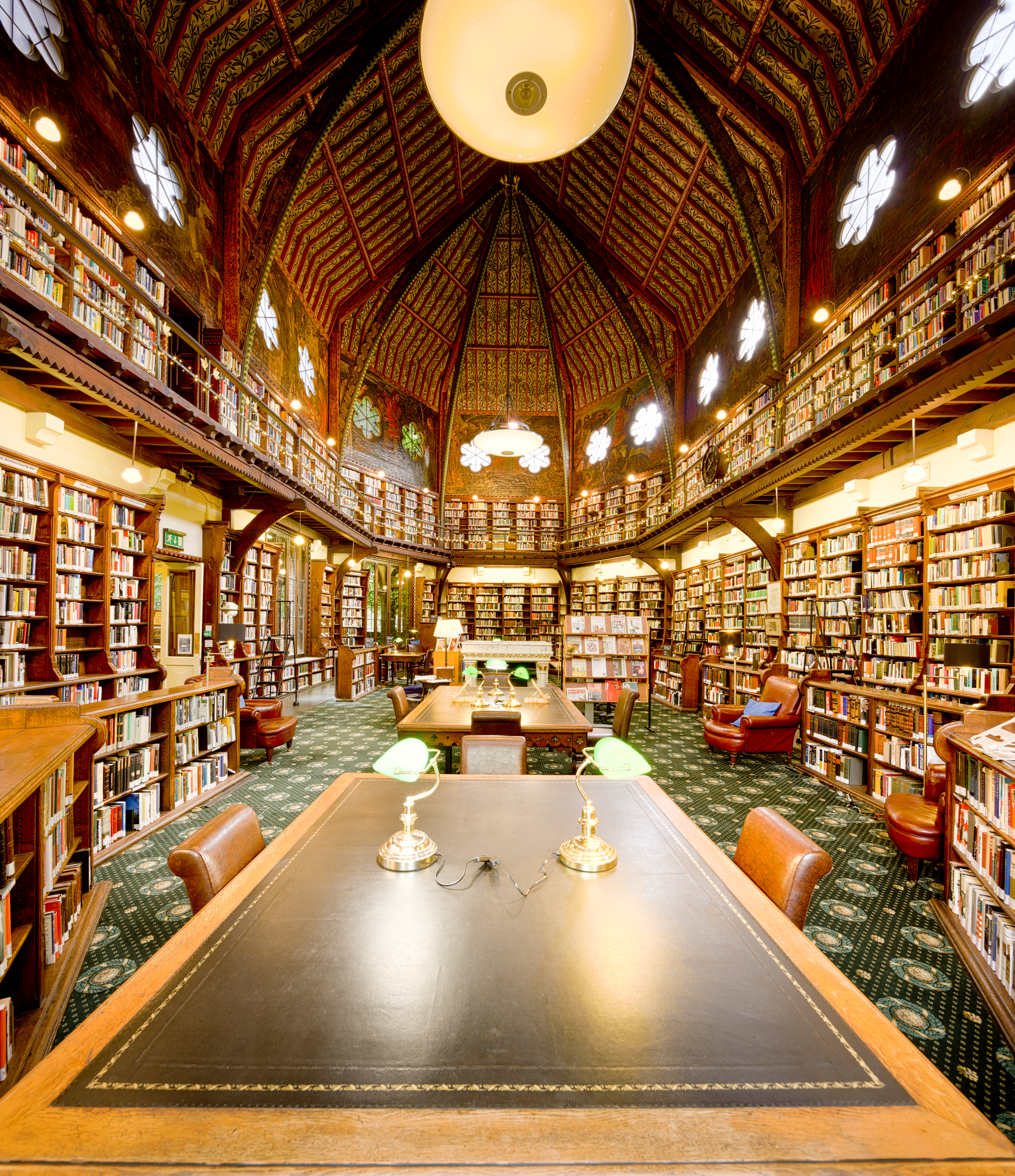
The Old Library

The original Woodward debating chamber is now known as "The Old Library". The Old Library is best known for its Pre-Raphaelite paintings by Dante Gabriel Rossetti, Edward Burne-Jones and William Morris, referred to collectively as the Oxford Union murals. The current debating chamber and several further extensions to the main buildings were added over the next forty years. The final extension was designed in a conventional Gothic Revival style by Walter Mills and Thorpe, and built in 1910–11. It provides the Macmillan Room (the union dining room) and snooker room on the first floor above the Goodman Library, underneath which there are basement library stacks. The union also consists of a bar on the ground floor, the Gladstone Room (a reception room) and the Morris Room (a meeting room) on the first floor, and a members' TV room on the second (uppermost) floor, along with separate offices for the president, librarian, treasurer and secretary.

Many of the rooms in the union are named after figures from the union's past, such as the Goodman Library with its oriel windows and the wood-panelled Macmillan Room with barrel ceiling.

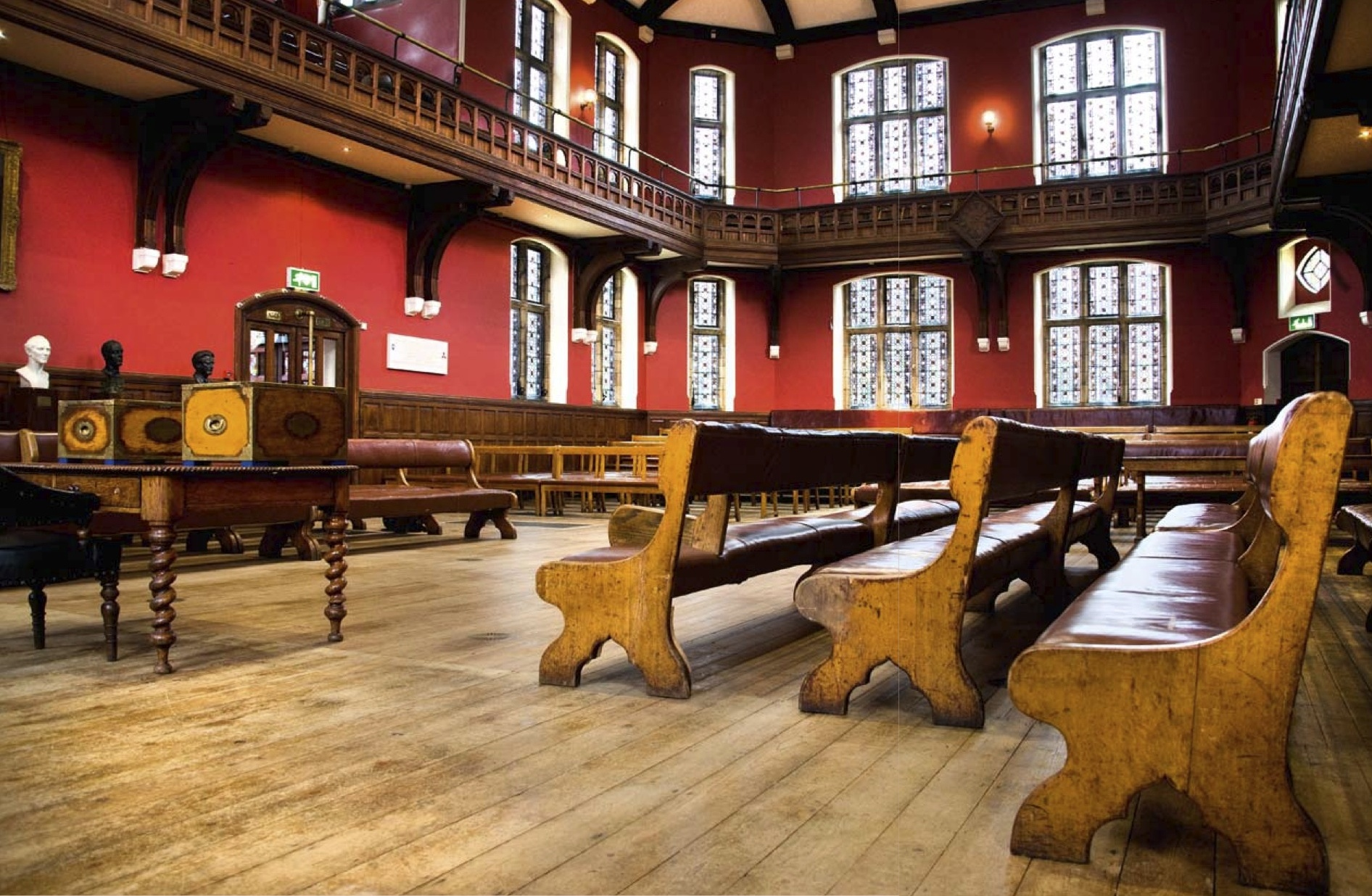
The Debating Chamber

The Old Library contains a fireplace situated in the middle of the floor with a concealed flue.

The debating chamber features busts of such notables as Roy Jenkins, Edward Heath, Michael Heseltine, George Curzon and William Gladstone. It is also home to a grand piano, known as the "Bartlet-Jones Piano" after the Oxford University Music Society president who found it dusty and forgotten in a cupboard in the Holywell Music Room and placed it on permanent loan to the union. The piano was unveiled by Vladimir Ashkenazy who famously refused to play it in front of the packed chamber because he "had not warmed up". The despatch boxes which continue to be used in union debates are modelled on those in the House of Commons.

As recently as the 1970s the Oxford Union still provided a full silver service dining room for its members which, like its famous bar, was the afternoon and evening venue of choice for many of the university's leading undergraduate journalists and politicos. To be invited to dine at the large table in the bay window – the usual domain of the Union's president – was considered the acme of attainment in that particular sphere of the university. It was often said more plots were hatched around that particular table on a regular evening than in the Houses of Parliament on Bonfire Night. Similarly, the union's two libraries were extensively used by that same cadre of undergraduates (principally humanities students) who were rushing at the last minute to complete the obligatory weekly essay for their formal university education.

The union's buildings were used as a location for each of the films Oxford Blues (1984) and The Madness of King George (1994).

== Debating ==
Debating at the Oxford Union takes two forms: competitive debating and chamber debating.

Competitive debating offers members of the Union debate workshops and a platform upon which to practise and improve their debating skills. The Union's best debaters compete internationally against other top debating societies, and the Oxford Union regularly fields successful teams at the World Universities Debating Championship (which the Union hosted in 1993) and the European Universities Debating Championship.

The Union also runs the Oxford Schools' Debating Competition and the Oxford Intervarsity Debating Competition, each of which attracts schools and universities from around the world, as well as running a number of internal debating competitions. Oxford Schools' Debating Competition is the largest schools' competition in the world, with over one thousand teams entering each year.

There are chamber debates every Thursday evening during University terms. Experts for the proposition and opposition present paper speeches to the house. Members have an opportunity to deliver brief speeches from the floor. Following the style of the British Parliament, a motion is moved to "divide the House" to vote. Members in the chamber vote on the proposition with their feet by exiting the hall through a door designed to model the voting lobbies of the House of Commons, the right-hand side being marked 'ayes' and the left-hand side 'noes'.

Oxford Union Society debates are filmed and licensed by Oxford Union Limited, a registered company controlled by the Oxford Union Society. Oxford Union Limited runs a YouTube channel which has more than 2.4 million subscribers and has gained more than 250 million views across its videos.

== Governance ==
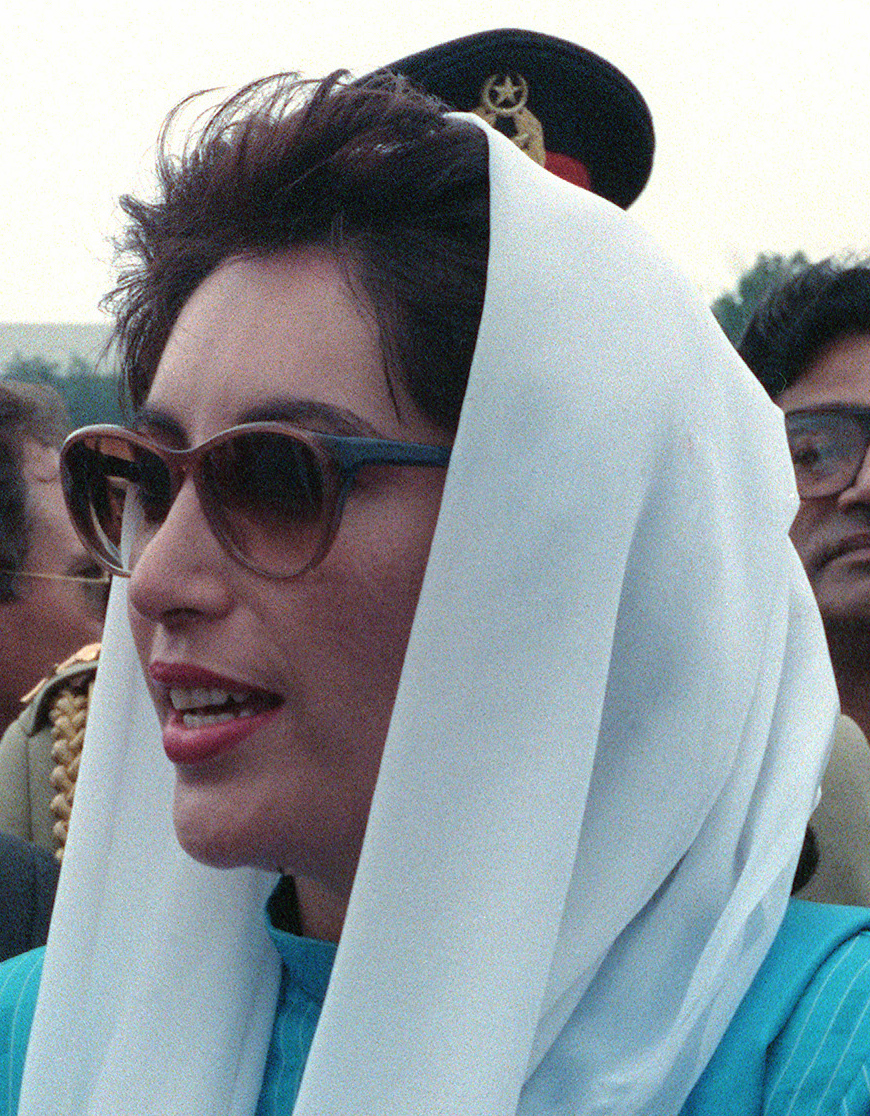
Benazir Bhutto served as the first woman president of the Oxford Union

The Oxford Union's general conduct and management is governed by the Standing Committee. The voting members are:

- The Junior Officers (The President, President-Elect, Junior Librarian, Junior Treasurer, Librarian-Elect, Treasurer-Elect, and the Secretary)
- Six elected members
- Any Ex-President within six terms of leaving office who has registered their vote
- Any other Ex-Junior Officer within three terms of leaving office who has registered their vote

The non-voting members are:

- The returning officer – responsible for the conduct of the Union's elections and for the interpretation of the Union's Rules and Standing Orders
- The chair of the Consultative Committee – responsible for logistics and facilitation of events
- The chair of the Debate Selection Committee – responsible for overseeing the debating wing of the Union
- The senior officers (the Senior Librarian and the Senior Treasurer) – generally Oxford University academics and who must be members of the Union, responsible for supervising the society's finances and libraries
- The union's trustees

The bursar, the deputy bursar and the access officers attend meetings of standing committee in an advisory capacity.

Day-to-day management of the Union is partly conducted by professional staff, principally the Bursar, the Deputy Bursar and the House Manager.

=== Elections ===
Elections are held to fill the offices of President-elect, Librarian-elect, Treasurer-elect and Secretary, as well as 6 positions on the Standing Committee and 11 positions on the Secretary's Committee. To stand for election to the Secretary's Committee, members must make two speeches on different nights during the term they stand for election. For the other offices, candidates must have additionally made two such speeches in the previous term. Elections are always held on Friday of 7th Week of the university's Full Term.

The election for the chair of the Consultative Committee is held at the meeting of the Consultative Committee on Monday of the 8th week of each term. Only members who have attended four of the last eight meetings of the Consultative Committee may either stand for election as Chair or vote.

The number of elected positions on Standing Committee was increased from 5 to 7 in Michael Li's term (Trinity 2017) and implemented in Chris Zabilowicz's term (Michaelmas 2017). However, the number of elected positions was decreased back to 5 officers at the end of James Price's term (Hilary 2021) before being increased to six at the end of Molly Mantle's term. It remains an ongoing point of discussion within the society.

Students running for election usually stand as part of a team, known as slates, enabling voters to support a designated candidate for each position and increase each candidate's vote count.

== Controversies ==
=== 1996: OJ Simpson ===
In May 1996 President Paul Kenward invited O. J. Simpson to address the union, his first public address since his October acquittal by a Los Angeles jury of murdering his ex-wife Nicole Brown Simpson and her friend Ron Goldman in 1994. Speaking for 90 minutes in front of 1,300 students, Simpson spoke of racism in the Los Angeles Police Department, and said he was sorry for hitting his wife, Nicole.

Paul Kenward had given O. J. Simpson assurances there would be no broadcast media at the union debate. However, Chris Philp, (now Conservative MP and then a second-year student at University College and features editor of the student magazine Cherwell), was fined £50 for selling a written transcript of the debate and helping to sell an audio cassette to TV stations.

=== 2007: David Irving and Nick Griffin debate ===
In November 2007, President Luke Tryl sparked controversy by inviting Holocaust denier David Irving and British National Party leader Nick Griffin to speak at a Union forum on the topic of free speech. The Student Population at a council meeting voted to oppose the invitations. Following this and protests by other student groups, a poll of the Union's members was taken and resulted in a two-to-one majority in favour of the invitations.

On the evening of the planned debate several hundred protesters gathered outside the Union buildings, chanting anti-fascist slogans and later preventing guests and Union members from entering the premises. Around 20 protesters succeeded in breaching the poorly maintained security cordon and attempted to force their way through to the main chamber. Members of the waiting audience blocked access by pushing back against the chamber doors. After students were convinced to yield to the protesters by Union staff, a sit-in protest was staged in the debating chamber, preventing a full debate from occurring due to security concerns. Because of a lack of security personnel, a number of students from the audience eventually came to take on the responsibilities of controlling events, in one instance preventing a scuffle from breaking out between a protester and members of the audience, and eventually assisting police in herding protesters from the main hall. One student protester interviewed by BBC News reported that fellow protesters played 'jingles' on the piano and danced on the president's chair though the truth of the latter assertion was seriously questioned by eyewitnesses. Smaller debates were eventually held with Irving and Griffin in separate rooms, amid criticism that the police and Union officials had not foreseen the degree of unrest which the controversial invitations would arouse.

The president of Oxford University Student Union, Martin McCluskey, strongly criticised the decision to proceed with the debate, saying that providing Irving and Griffin with a platform for their extreme views afforded them undue legitimacy. Following the event, some, including Oxford MP Evan Harris, criticised the No Platform Policy adopted by the Student Union.

=== 2015: Marine Le Pen ===
In February 2015, the Union invited Marine Le Pen, the leader of the Front National in France, to address the Union, in view of the popularity of the FN in the French polls at the time. This sparked considerable controversy, with allegations of Le Pen endorsing anti-Semitism and Islamophobia. The speech went ahead as planned, albeit delayed by the protesters blockading the Union's main entrance, and briefly breaking into the building. In all, over 400 people turned up to the demonstration. There was considerable controversy over OUSU's response, with allegations that OUSU had indirectly supported the protesters and not adequately condemned threats of violence against Union members who had attempted to attend the talk.

=== 2018: Heather Marsh ===
In 2018, human rights activist Heather Marsh accused the Oxford Union of censorship and violating a contractual obligation when they failed to post video of a "Whistleblowing" panel in which she appeared to the official Oxford Union YouTube channel, allegedly at the request of a fellow panelist, former CIA operative David Shedd. Oxford Union president Gui Cavalcanti replied that its agreement with Marsh and other panelists gave them the right but not the obligation to publish video of any events, adding that "just this academic year, we’ve had multiple events not uploaded, ranging from J. J. Abrams to Sir Patrick Stewart." A transcript of the panel and its 22-minute audio are available online.

=== 2019: Ebenezer Azamati ===
In October 2019, before the annual 'No Confidence' debate, blind Ghanaian graduate student Ebenezer Azamati was violently removed from the hall for refusing to relinquish his seat, which had been reserved for a committee member. Azmati later had his membership revoked for two terms for 'violent misconduct'. Footage of the event was recorded by another member, and was subsequently uploaded to the internet. This led to protests from the university's AfriSoc society on Azmati's behalf, and soon gained national news media coverage. This was eventually followed by the resignation of standing committee members and other Union officials, and then by Union president Brendan McGrath on 19 November. Azmati was compensated an undisclosed amount.

=== 2023: Kathleen Stock ===
In April 2023, the union invited the gender-critical feminist philosopher Kathleen Stock. The invitation was met with criticism from the Oxford University LGBTQ+ Society and the student union, who alleged Stock's views were transphobic and called upon the union to rescind the invitation. The union declined to disinvite Stock, saying in a statement that members would have the 'opportunity to respectfully engage and challenge' Stock. Letters both in support and in opposition to Stock's talk were published in national publications, signed by academics and students, and prompted intervention from prime minister Rishi Sunak, who told the Telegraph that 'University should be an environment where debate is supported, not stifled. We mustn't allow a small but vocal few to shut down discussion. Kathleen Stock's invitation to the Oxford Union should stand'. Over a hundred protestors gathered outside the buildings on the day. The event went ahead, but shortly after it started, a protestor glued themselves to the floor of the union's debating chamber before subsequently being removed by police.

=== 2024: Allegations of institutional racism ===
In June 2024, an election tribunal disqualified Ebrahim Osman Mowafy, who had been elected as the first Arab President of the Oxford Union in March 2024, from the post of president-elect. Mowafy was the third President of the Union—and fifth officer—to be removed from elected office within 18 months. The next day, two letters were sent to the union's trustees and senior officers, signed by the majority of the governing body and all of the non-white ex-presidents in statu pupillari. These alleged that the society's disciplinary procedures were "opaque", "compromised" and had been repeatedly "disproportionately targeting individuals from non-traditional backgrounds", as well as reporting that the tribunal's clerk, the acting returning officer, had been overheard making explicitly Islamophobic remarks both in reference to the defendant and more broadly, Muslim women. Three of the society's committees, including its largest committee and the standing committee, passed motions declaring the union to be "institutionally racist", as well as the governing body passing a motion of no confidence in the incumbent returning officer. On 30 June an Appellate Board reinstated Mowafy, who went on to serve as president for Michaelmas Term 2024. In his term, Mowafy would go on to preside over the historic and controversial Kashmir independence and Israeli genocide debates.

=== 2024: Kashmir independence debate ===
On 14 November 2024, the Oxford Union Hosted a debate with the motion "This House Believes in the Independent State of Kashmir". The debate sparked wide controversy in Indian media. A protest was held outside the debate, opposing both the criticism of the territorial integrity of India and platforming speakers with alleged links to terrorism. A member interrupted the debate, accusing the president, Ebrahim Osman-Mowafy, of being "a Pakistani stooge", and posting a motion of no confidence against Mowafy. In a statement, the Union emphasised its commitment to free speech and intellectual exchange, noting "We believe that debates should challenge ideas, engage with difficult subjects, and allow for the free expression of all viewpoints". The Motion of no confidence against Mowafy was unsuccessful, and the Union voted in favour of an independent state of Kashmir by a margin of 207 to 108.

=== 2024: Israeli genocide debate ===
On 28 November 2024, the Oxford Union hosted a debate with the motion "This house believes Israel is an apartheid state responsible for genocide", voting in favour of the motion by a margin of 278–59. The debate sparked significant discourse from both pro-Palestinian and pro-Israeli groups.

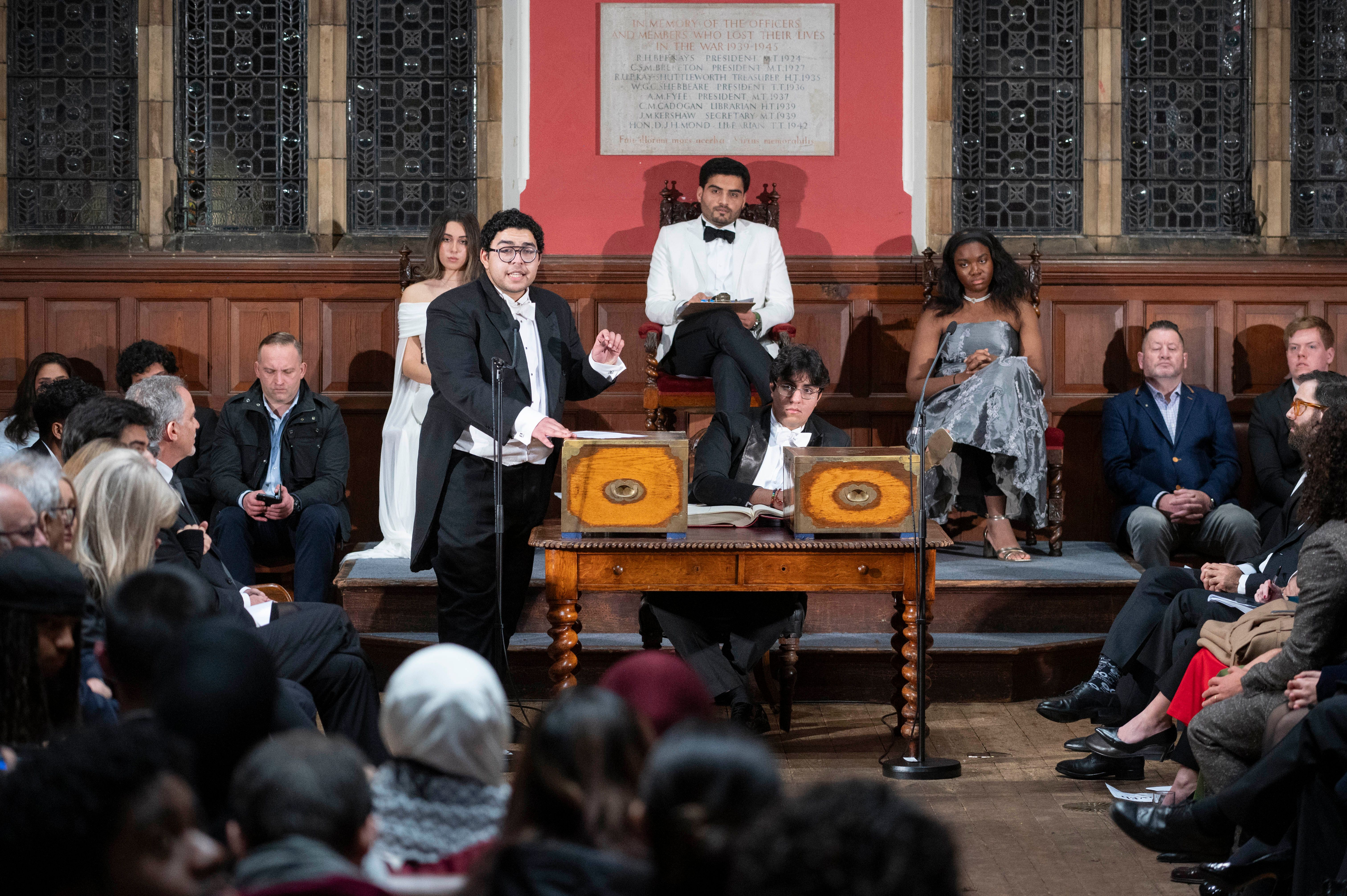
The debate on the motion "This House Believes Israel is an Apartheid State Responsible for Genocide"

Among the speakers in favour of the motion were Palestinian-American author Susan Abulhawa, Palestinian poet and activist Mohammed El-Kurd, and Israeli-American activist Miko Peled, with Union President Ebrahim Osman-Mowafy speaking in place of Norman Finkelstein who could not attend the debate. Abulhawa's speech was subsequently reproduced by Al-Jazeera and other outlets, which described the vote as a "historic" motion.

Speakers opposing the motion included Mosab Hassan Yousef, the son of Hamas co-founder Hassan Yousef, who had worked as a spy for Israel's security agency, Shin Bet.

In an opinion piece for The Spectator, Jonathan Sacerdoti alleged that the debate was engineered to support the proposition side. He claimed that there was a hostile environment for the opposition speakers, and that adequate information was not given as to who would be speaking. The president of the Oxford Union, Ebrahim Osman-Mowafy, who organised the debate, disputed this claim in a retrospective on the debate for The Massachusetts Review, stating that "Israeli historian Benny Morris, British broadcaster Jonathan Sacerdoti, and pro-Israel activists Natasha Hausdorff and Yoseph Haddad comprised the opposition. Morris dropped out, followed by Finkelstein. The opposition insisted that Morris be replaced by Mosab Hassan Yousef".

Similarly, Yoseph Haddad stated that his removal from the chamber after he made his speech was unjust and that comments in support of the 7 October attack were made. Haddad's claim was contested by Osman-Mowafy, who stated that "after multiple warnings, Haddad was removed after physically intimidating a member and preventing her from returning to her seat".

Three hundred academics, co-signed a letter organised by the Pinsker Centre to William Hague, the newly elected Chancellor of the University of Oxford. The letter described the "dangerous rhetoric" as a violation of the Terrorism Act 2000. However an enquiry did not find any misconduct, with Counter Terrorism Policing South East announcing on 18 March 2025 that following enquires, the investigation had concluded with no action being taken.

=== 2025: Susan Abulhawa ===
Palestinian author Susan Abulhawa was one of the speakers in proposition of the motion "This House Believes Israel is an Apartheid State Responsible for Genocide" in late 2024. OLDUT, which holds the Union's premises in trust, insisted that the full, unedited version of Abulhawa's speech should not be uploaded and threatened to remove OUS from the Frewin Court buildings if they uploaded the full speech of Abulhawa. However the Standing Committee defied the trustees' threat, and voted to upload Abulhawa's full speech on 16 June 2025.

In September 2025, the European Legal Support Center announced that they had filed a claim against the Oxford Union on behalf of Abulhawa, for "unlawful and unethical editing the recording of her speech at the Oxford Union in a November 2024 debate".

=== 2025: Assassination of Charlie Kirk ===
On 10 September 2025, shortly after the assassination of American conservative activist Charlie Kirk, Oxford Union President-Elect George Abaraonye published "Charlie Kirk got shot loool" to his personal Instagram, alongside the message to a WhatsApp group chat: "Charlie Kirk got shot, let's fucking go". Abaraonye had debated Kirk at the Oxford Union in May 2025 on the topic of toxic masculinity.

The comments received widespread backlash, with current Union leadership issuing a public statement "unequivocally" condemning them. Scheduled speakers including Josh Wolfe, a co-founder of venture capital firm Lux Capital, and the executive director of StopAntisemitism, appeared to decline invitations to speak in the upcoming term as a result of the controversy. Abaraonye later issued a qualified withdrawal of his comments. No disciplinary action was taken against Abaraonye by University College, Oxford, where he was a student, though on 13 September the Oxford Union announced it had initiated disciplinary proceedings against him.

Abaraonye submitted a vote of no confidence in himself. On 21 October it was announced that with 1,228 votes of no confidence to 501 of confidence, Abaraonye was considered to have resigned as president-elect.

Abaraonye faced extensive online harassment for the comments in the form of racist abuse and death threats, with several other students from the WhatsApp group chat being the target of doxxing.

=== 2025: Disruption of Ehud Olmert's address ===
Former Israeli prime minister Ehud Olmert was invited, to speak at the Union on 17 November 2025. His address was disrupted by approximately 60 protesters affiliated with the groups Oxford Schools 4 Palestine, Oxford Action 4 Palestine, and Youth Demand Oxford. The protesters delayed the event by blocking the entrance to the debating chamber, leading to three arrests by the police. Security removed several demonstrators who disrupted the debate inside the chamber, chanting slogans and displaying hands dipped in red paint.

=== 2026: Tommy Robinson, Carl Benjamin, Laurence Fox, Kamil Idris Invitations ===
On 7 March 2026, then Treasurer of the Oxford Union Catherine Xu was elected as the Union's president for Michaelmas 2026. On 5 May 2026, Xu was found guilty of electoral fraud by a tribunal, removed from her position as president-elect and permanently banned from running for any office of the Union, with her membership temporarily suspended.

On 1 May 2026, Cherwell reported that political commentator Carl Benjamin, who had been invited to speak at a Union debate by President Arwa Elrayyes had been disinvited shortly before the debate took place. Cherwell reported that a screenshot of an email shown by Benjamin stated that the decision followed concerns raised to the Union by a partner organisation about what the email described as a "direct threat of sexual violence against a woman in public office". Student groups It Happens Here Oxford and Oxford Feminist Society had also issued a joint statement expressing "strong reservations" about Benjamin's invitation, citing his past comments about sexual violence, including remarks directed at Labour MP Jess Phillips, and calling for the invitation to be withdrawn.

The same day, it was reported that Katharine Birbalsingh, the headteacher of Michaela Community School, had criticised the Union after a debate she had been invited to attend was cancelled. In a public letter addressed to the Union president Arwa Elrayyes, Birbalsingh accused Union officers of "rudeness", being "ill-mannered", and "stonewalling", and said that, after seeing that Benjamin's invitation had been rescinded, she believed the Union's conduct towards invitees was "widespread".

On 2 May 2026, The Oxford Student reported that far-right political activist and founder of the English Defence League Tommy Robinson had been invited to speak at a Union debate on 28 May, with the debate's motion being "This House believes the West is right to be suspicious of Islam." The invitation was met with condemnation by several student societies and groups, including Oxford Students Against Discrimination, Stand Up To Racism UK, Oxford Arab Society, Oxford African and Caribbean Society, and Oxford Students Amnesty International, as well as anti-racist protest groups and senior Union officials. Cherwell reported that Oxford Students Against Discrimination and Stand Up To Racism UK condemned the invitation "in the strongest possible terms" and called on Union president Arwa Elrayess to confirm that the invitation had been rescinded, issue a public apology, and acknowledge harm caused to students.

On 12 May 2026, The Oxford Student reported that Laurence Fox had also been invited to speak in favour of the motion alongside Robinson, citing two Union sources and a debate-planning spreadsheet seen by the newspaper. The same report stated that Shermar Pryce, the president's former chief advisor, had resigned over the invitation, describing the decision as "callous" and based on "malformed conceptions of free speech". Cherwell later reported that Pryce had alleged that the decision had been made without the knowledge of the majority of committee members.

Searchlight also reported internal criticism from Alex Evans, the Union's LGBTQIA+ officer, who issued an open letter condemning the invitation and arguing that Robinson was expected to engage in incitement at the debate. Evans alleged that the invitation reflected "provocation and a willingness to endanger public safety in order to obtain publicity and fill seats", and criticised the Union for placing "publicity, controversy, and shock value" above public safety and reasoned debate. Union President Elrayess was accused of "deliberately stoking racist and Islamophobic controversy" and of "pandering to the far right".

On 21 May 2026, the Rt Revd Dr Steven Croft, Bishop of Oxford, and Imam Monawar Hussain, co-chairs of the Oxfordshire Faith and Civic Leaders Forum and the Thames Valley Faith and Civic Leaders Forum, issued a joint statement calling the invitation "untimely and divisive" and asking that it be reconsidered and withdrawn. The statement said that the invitation came amid rising community tensions, following Robinson's Unite the Kingdom rally in London on 15 May and the shooting at a mosque in San Diego on 19 May. The Muslim Council of Britain separately condemned comments at the Unite the Kingdom rally, saying that Robinson had called for "many Muslims to leave this country" and had said that he "would stop Islam".

Muslim intellectuals and politicians mostly boycotted the debate, on the basis that Robinson should not be granted the prestige of an Oxford Union platform and that refused to share a platform with him was a matter of principle. On 23 May 2026, it was reported that the debate was "on the brink of collapse"; it stated that the Union had announced that the 28 May debate had been postponed until later in term "to allow time for planning", while reports suggested that Robinson's appearance and those of other speakers had been cancelled.

On 13 May 2026, Sudanese prime minister Kamil Idris spoke at the Union. His appearance was met with protests, with Sudanese activists accusing the Oxford Union of platforming a military-backed government complicit in war crimes and sexual violence. The protests resulted in a physical altercation between protesters and members of the prime minister's security detail.

== Retractions of speaker invitations ==
In a few notable cases the Union has withdrawn invitations to controversial speakers, as the result of public pressure, specific pressure by lobbyists, and concerns about safety.

=== 1998: John Tyndall ===
A debate that was to have involved the far-right fascist leader John Tyndall was met with a campaign of resistance in 1998. This opposition, coupled with police advice following a series of racially motivated nail-bombings in London, resulted in the cancellation of the debate.

=== 2001: David Irving ===
An invitation to the writer and Holocaust denier David Irving to speak in a debate on censorship in 2001 was met by a coordinated campaign by left-wing, Jewish, and anti-fascist groups, together with the elected leadership of the Oxford University Student Union, to have the invitation withdrawn. Following a meeting of Union members, and a subsequent meeting of the Union's governing body, the Standing Committee, the president decided the debate would have to be cancelled. Irving did speak at a Union debate in 2007.

=== 2009: Philip Nitschke ===
In March 2009, the Union withdrew an invitation to euthanasia campaigner Philip Nitschke after Nitschke had already accepted the invitation. Nitschke received a second e-mail cancelling the invitation "in the interests of there being a 'fair debate'", and was told other speakers were unwilling to speak alongside him. The debate topic was the legalisation of assisted suicide, a field in which Nitschke is prominent. The reason given by Oxford Union President Corey Dixon was that two other speakers "disagree with his particular take on [assisted suicide]". According to Dixon, the speakers who successfully pressured the Union to withdraw Nitschke's invitation were a member of the public, whose brother had undergone assisted death, and British euthanasia campaigner Michael Irwin. However, Irwin denied that he had applied pressure to exclude Nitschke.

The Oxford Union released a statement explaining the decision: "An administrative decision was made to ensure we had three speakers on each side of the debate, which was proving difficult due to Nitschke's attendance. It is always in the interests of the Oxford Union to ensure a balanced debate with as wide-ranging views as possible represented. There may have been miscommunication between the Oxford Union and Nitschke. We certainly hope that no offence has been caused. The Oxford Union is a politically-neutral institution and holds no opinion on Nitschke's views."

Nitschke commented, "This famous society has a long tradition of championing free speech. To suggest that my views on end-of-life issues are inappropriate simply because I believe that all rational elderly adults should have access to the best end-of-life information beggars belief." He also called the act "an almost unprecedented act of censorship". Nitschke gave a series of lectures across the UK at the time the debate was held.

== Past officers ==
Notable past Presidents and Junior Officers of the Oxford Union include:

- Eric Anthony Abrahams (Cabinet minister in Jamaica): President (MT 1964)
- Jonathan Aitken (UK Cabinet minister 1992–95): Librarian
- Tariq Ali (author): President (TT 1965)
- H. H. Asquith (UK prime minister): President (TT 1874)
- Lalith Athulathmudali (Cabinet minister in Sri Lanka): President (HT 1958)
- S. W. R. D. Bandaranaike (Prime Minister of Ceylon 1956–1959): Treasurer (TT 1924)
- Ruzwana Bashir (entrepreneur): President (MT 2004)
- Hilaire Belloc (author): President (HT 1895)
- Michael Beloff (barrister, President of Trinity College, Oxford): President (MT 1962)
- Tony Benn (UK Cabinet minister): President (TT 1947)
- Benazir Bhutto (Prime Minister of Pakistan): President (HT 1977)
- Gyles Brandreth (UK Member of Parliament, comedian): President (MT 1969)
- John Buchan (author): President (HT 1899)
- Anthony Crosland (UK Foreign Secretary): President (TT 1946)
- Edwina Currie (UK Government minister): Librarian
- Lord Curzon (UK Foreign Secretary 1919–24): President (MT 1880)
- Robin Day (BBC Presenter): President (TT 1950)
- Lord James Douglas-Hamilton (Junior Scottish minister 1987–97): President (TT 1964)
- Michael Foot (Labour leader): President (MT 1933)
- Paul Foot (journalist, dep. ed. Private Eye): President (TT 1961)
- William Ewart Gladstone (UK prime minister): President (MT 1830)
- Michael Gove (UK Cabinet minister): President (HT 1988)
- Sam Gyimah (UK Member of Parliament): President (MT 1997)
- William Hague (UK foreign secretary): President (MT 1981)
- Denis Healey (UK Chancellor of the Exchequer): Librarian
- Edward Heath (UK prime minister): President (HT 1939)
- Michael Heseltine (UK deputy prime minister): President (MT 1954)
- Damian Hinds (UK Member of Parliament): President (TT 1991)
- Douglas Hogg (UK Cabinet minister): President (MT 1965)
- Quentin Hogg (Lord Hailsham, UK Lord Chancellor): President (TT 1929)
- Christopher Hollis (UK Member of Parliament): President (MT 1923)
- Anthony Howard (journalist): President (TT 1955)
- Jeremy Isaacs (TV executive): President (HT 1955)
- Peter Jay (journalist, chairman of OLDUT trustees): President (TT 1960)
- Roy Jenkins (UK Chancellor of the Exchequer): Librarian
- Boris Johnson (UK prime minister): President (TT 1986)
- Humayun Kabir (Indian politician) Librarian 1931
- Lakshman Kadirgamar (Minister of Foreign Affairs of Sri Lanka 1994–2001): President (HT 1959)
- Uwe Kitzinger (head of INSEAD, Founder of Templeton College): President (HT 1950)
- Cosmo Gordon Lang (Archbishop of Canterbury): President (MT 1884)
- David Lewis (leader, New Democratic Party of Canada): President (HT 1934)
- Harold Macmillan (UK prime minister): Librarian
- Henry Edward Manning (Archbishop of Westminster 1865–1892): President (MT 1829)
- Philip May (husband of UK prime minister): President (TT 1979)
- Louise Mensch (UK Member of Parliament): Secretary (1991?)
- Viscount Monckton (UK Cabinet minister 1951–57): President (HT 1913)
- Nicky Morgan (UK Education Secretary): Treasurer
- John Playfair Price (UK diplomat): President (TT 1927)
- Julian Priestley (Secretary-General of the European Parliament 1997–2007): President (HT 1972)
- Jacob Rees-Mogg (UK Member of Parliament): Librarian (1990)
- William Rees-Mogg (Editor of 'The Times'): President (TT 1951)
- Andrew Rowe (UK Member of Parliament): Librarian
- George Mearns Savery (educator, and founder of Harrogate Ladies' College) President (1876).
- 3rd Marquess of Salisbury (UK prime minister): Secretary (MT 1848)
- F. E. Smith (Lord Birkenhead, UK lord chancellor): President (TT 1894)
- Montek Singh Ahluwalia (economist, IMF): President (MT 1966)
- Andrew Sullivan (political commentator): President (TT 1983)
- William Temple (Archbishop of Canterbury): President (HT 1904)
- Jeremy Thorpe (UK Liberal leader): President (HT 1951)
- Ann Widdecombe (UK Member of Parliament): Secretary (1971), Treasurer (1972)

(MT = Michaelmas Term; HT = Hilary Term; TT = Trinity Term)

== See also ==
- List of presidents of the Oxford Union
- Durham Union
- Olivaint Conference of Belgium
- York Dialectic Union
