= Victoria Atkins =

British politician (born 1976)

The Right Honourable Victoria Atkins MP
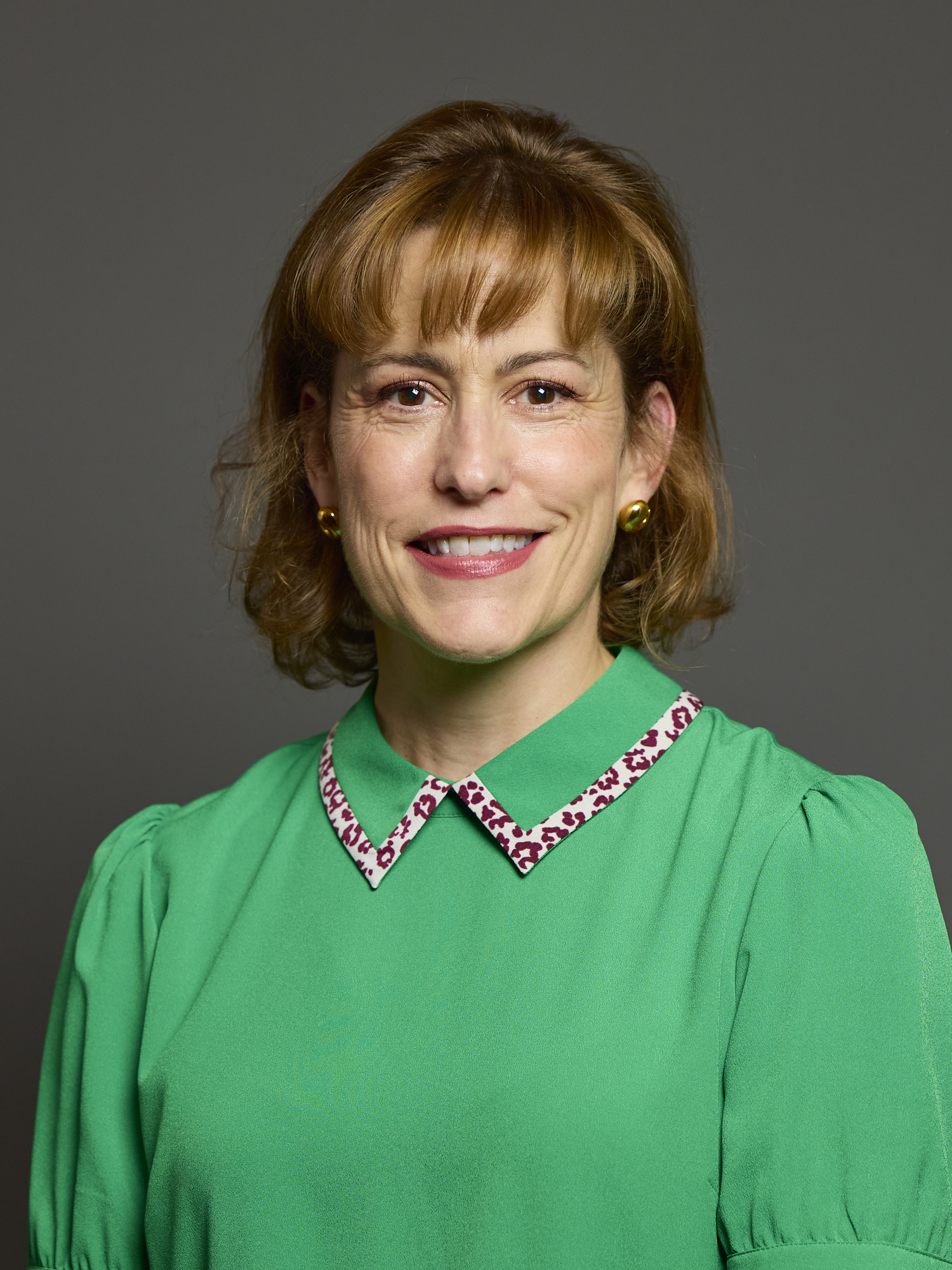
- Official portrait, 2024

Shadow Secretary of State for Environment, Food and Rural Affairs
- Incumbent
- Assumed office 5 November 2024
- Leader: Kemi Badenoch
- Preceded by: Steve Barclay

Shadow Secretary of State for Health and Social Care
- In office 8 July 2024 – 5 November 2024
- Leader: Rishi Sunak
- Preceded by: Wes Streeting
- Succeeded by: Edward Argar

Secretary of State for Health and Social Care
- In office 13 November 2023 – 5 July 2024
- Prime Minister: Rishi Sunak
- Preceded by: Steve Barclay
- Succeeded by: Wes Streeting

Financial Secretary to the Treasury
- In office 27 October 2022 – 13 November 2023
- Prime Minister: Rishi Sunak
- Preceded by: Andrew Griffith
- Succeeded by: Nigel Huddleston

Minister of State for Prisons and Probation
- In office 16 September 2021 – 6 July 2022
- Prime Minister: Boris Johnson
- Preceded by: Lucy Frazer
- Succeeded by: Stuart Andrew

Minister for Afghan Resettlement
- In office 16 September 2021 – 8 March 2022
- Prime Minister: Boris Johnson
- Preceded by: Richard Harrington (Note: As Parliamentary Under-Secretary of State for Syrian Refugees. Office vacant between 17 July 2016 and 16 September 2021.)
- Succeeded by: The Lord Harrington of Watford (Note: As Minister of State for Refugees.)
Junior ministerial positions
Parliamentary Under-Secretary of State for Safeguarding
In office 9 November 2017 – 16 September 2021
Prime Minister	Theresa May; Boris Johnson
Preceded by	Sarah Newton
Succeeded by	Rachel Maclean
Parliamentary Under-Secretary of State for Women
In office 8 January 2018 – 13 February 2020
Prime Minister	Theresa May; Boris Johnson
Preceded by	Anne Milton
Succeeded by	The Baroness Berridge

Member of Parliament for Louth and Horncastle
- Incumbent
- Assumed office 7 May 2015
- Preceded by: Peter Tapsell
- Majority: 5,506 (11.8%)

Personal details
- Born: Victoria Mary Atkins; 22 March 1976 (age 50) London, England
- Party: Conservative
- Spouse: Paul Kenward
- Children: 1
- Parent: Robert Atkins (father)
- Education: Arnold School
- Alma mater: Corpus Christi College, Cambridge (BA)
- Website: www.victoriaatkins.org.uk

Victoria Mary Atkins (born 22 March 1976) is a British politician who served in various ministerial positions under Prime Ministers Theresa May, Boris Johnson and Rishi Sunak between 2017 and 2024, lastly as Secretary of State for Health and Social Care from November 2023 to July 2024. A member of the Conservative Party, she has been the Member of Parliament (MP) for Louth and Horncastle since 2015 and Shadow Secretary of State for Environment, Food and Rural Affairs since November 2024. Before her political career, she worked as a barrister specialising in organised crime.

Atkins was appointed Parliamentary Under-Secretary of State for Safeguarding at the Home Office in November 2017 by Prime Minister Theresa May. Following the formation of the first Johnson ministry in July 2019, she remained in her post. On 16 September 2021, during the cabinet reshuffle, Boris Johnson appointed Atkins Minister of State for Prisons and Probation and Minister for Afghan Resettlement; she oversaw Operation Pitting in the latter role until she was replaced in March 2022. She resigned as Prisons Minister during the July 2022 government crisis, and called on Johnson to resign. After Rishi Sunak became Prime Minister in October 2022, she was appointed Financial Secretary to the Treasury before being promoted to Health Secretary in the November 2023 cabinet reshuffle.

== Early life and career ==
Victoria Atkins was born on 22 March 1976 in London, the daughter of Sir Robert Atkins, a former Conservative MP and MEP, and Lady (Dulcie) Atkins, a Conservative councillor and mayor. She was diagnosed with Type 1 diabetes at the age of three.

Atkins was privately educated at Arnold School, a co-educational school in Blackpool in Lancashire, and studied law at Corpus Christi College, Cambridge.

Atkins was called to the bar (Middle Temple) in 1998. She worked as a barrister in the field of fraud in London.

== Political career ==
In 2010, Atkins was shortlisted for the safe seat of Salisbury, eventually losing out to John Glen, who was elected MP for the seat. In November 2012, she stood unsuccessfully in the first ever Police and Crime Commissioner elections for the Gloucestershire Constabulary area. Although she garnered the most first preference votes, she lost to former police superintendent Martin Surl (an independent candidate) when second preferences were counted.

For the 2015 election, she was on the shortlist for the Tonbridge and Malling seat, along with Edward Argar, Chris Philp, and Tom Tugendhat. Tugendhat won the selection; Atkins and her other opponents were selected for seats elsewhere in time for the same election.

== Parliamentary career ==
Atkins was selected over three others in July 2014 as the Conservative candidate for Louth and Horncastle, at a meeting (referred to as an "Open Primary" by the party) of around 200 local party members in Spilsby. It is a safe Conservative seat; all areas of it have been continuously held by the party since 1924.

The retiring MP was Sir Peter Tapsell, who at that time was Father of the House of Commons, having served the area for nearly 50 years in addition to his previous Parliamentary service. Former Prime Minister John Major (who first entered the House of Commons at the same time as her father) supported her first parliamentary election campaign, and has known her since she was a young girl.

=== 1st term (2015–2017) ===
Atkins was elected as the MP for Louth and Horncastle at the 2015 general election, winning 51.2% of the vote and with a majority of 14,977 votes. After being elected, Atkins was appointed as a member of the Home Affairs Select Committee in July 2015.

Atkins supported the UK remaining within the EU before the 2016 EU membership referendum, but consistently voted in favour of a referendum being held. After the referendum, she voted in favour of triggering Article 50 in February 2017.

=== 2nd term (2017–2019) ===
At the snap 2017 general election, she retained the seat with 63.9% of the votes and an increased majority, of 19,641.

In June 2017, Atkins was appointed as a junior minister. Following Priti Patel's resignation as International Development Secretary, she replaced Sarah Newton as Parliamentary Under Secretary of State for Vulnerability, Safeguarding and Countering Extremism in the Home Office.

In the House of Commons she has sat on the Draft Investigatory Powers Bill (Joint Committee) and the Home Affairs Committee.

In April 2018, Atkins said she did not know the number of police officers in the country during an 'awkward' interview with Nick Ferrari on the LBC radio station. Ferrari informed her that the number was 123,142. This followed the leak of a Home Office report that concluded cuts to police numbers had "likely contributed" to a rise in serious violent crime. The following month, she voluntarily recused herself from speaking on drug policy in relation to cannabis after it was reported that her husband Paul Kenward's company, British Sugar, grows under permit a non‐psychoactive variety of cannabis which is used in children's epilepsy medicine.

In June 2019, Atkins vetoed the appointment of Niamh Eastwood, the director of Release, to the independent advisory NGO Advisory Council on the Misuse of Drugs (ACMD). She did so as Eastwood had previously been critical of the Home Office's drug policy on social media, including criticising a letter by Atkins in which she opposed the introduction of drug consumption rooms. Eastwood had previously been approved by a Home Office advisory assessment panel. A subject access request by Eastwood revealed that ministers vetted social media profiles of appointments to public bodies including references to "Windrush", "the government", "Brexit", and "anything diversity-related". In October 2019, Professor Alex Stevens, a criminal justice expert, resigned from the ACMD over alleged "political vetting" of panel members by the government. Kit Malthouse, the Minister for Policing, replaced Atkins as the minister responsible for the government's drug policy on 7 October.

=== 3rd term (2019–2024) ===
In the 2019 general election, Atkins was re-elected for Louth and Horncastle with an increased majority of 28,868, obtaining 72.7% of the vote from a turnout of 65.7%.

In September 2021, following the withdrawal of foreign defence forces from Afghanistan and takeover by the Taliban, Atkins became Minister of State for Prisons and Probation at the Ministry of Justice and the Minister for Afghan Resettlement. She oversaw "Operation Pitting", the government's Afghan resettlement programme. On 6 July 2022, during the July 2022 United Kingdom government crisis, Atkins resigned as justice minister, citing concerns with party leadership.

In the November 2023 Cabinet reshuffle, Atkins was appointed Secretary of State for Health and Social Care.

Atkins was sworn in as a member of the Privy Council on 15 November 2023 at Buckingham Palace following her appointment, entitling her to the honorific prefix "The Right Honourable" for life.

=== 4th term (2024–) ===
At the 2024 general election, Atkins was again re-elected, with a decreased vote share of 37.5%, from a turnout of 61% and a decreased majority of 5,506. She was voted for by 22.7% of the electorate.

Following the subsequent formation of the Starmer ministry, Atkins was appointed Shadow Secretary of State for Health in Rishi Sunak's caretaker Shadow Cabinet.

During a debate in the House of Commons on 19 July 2024, Atkins was admonished by Acting Deputy Speaker Sir Christopher Chope for behaving "abominably" after attempting to intervene from the despatch box as Environment Secretary Steve Reed delivered a ministerial statement. Her spokesperson defended her actions, saying Reed had failed to answer her questions.

In November 2024, Atkins criticised the construction of overground pylons in her constituency, arguing instead that they should be built underground. Prime Minister Starmer defended them being built overground, saying it was necessary to provide cheap access to energy. Overground pylons between Grimsby to Walpole in Norfolk was estimated to cost about £1bn whereas it would cost £6.5bn to put them underground and £4.3bn for an offshore subsea cable.

== Personal life ==
Atkins is married to Paul Kenward, the managing director of British Sugar. They have one son.

== Notes ==
Parliament of the United Kingdom
Preceded by Peter Tapsell	Member of Parliament for Louth and Horncastle; 2015–present	Incumbent
Political offices
Preceded by Sarah Newton	Parliamentary Under-Secretary of State for Safeguarding; 2017–2021	Succeeded by Rachel Maclean
Preceded by Anne Milton	Parliamentary Under-Secretary of State for Women; 2018–2020	Succeeded by The Baroness Berridge
Previous: Andrew Griffith	Financial Secretary to the Treasury; 2022–2023	Succeeded by Nigel Huddleston
Preceded by Steve Barclay	Secretary of State for Health and Social Care; 2023–2024	Succeeded by Wes Streeting
