= British Sugar =

British food company

British Sugar plc
- Formerly: British Sugar Corporation Limited (1936–1982)
- Type: Subsidiary
- Industry: Sugar beet processing
- Predecessor: Anglo-Scottish Beet Sugar Corporation
- Founded: 1936
- Headquarters: Peterborough, England, United Kingdom
- Number of locations: 5
- Area served: United Kingdom
- Key people: Keith Packer (managing director)
- Products: Sugar; Bioethanol; Animal feed Topsoil; Soil conditioners
- Revenue: ▲£714.1 million (2021)
- Operating income: ▲£59.8 million (2021)
- Net income: ▲£35.3 million (2021)
- Number of employees: 1,400 (2021)
- Parent: Associated British Foods
- Website: britishsugar.co.uk

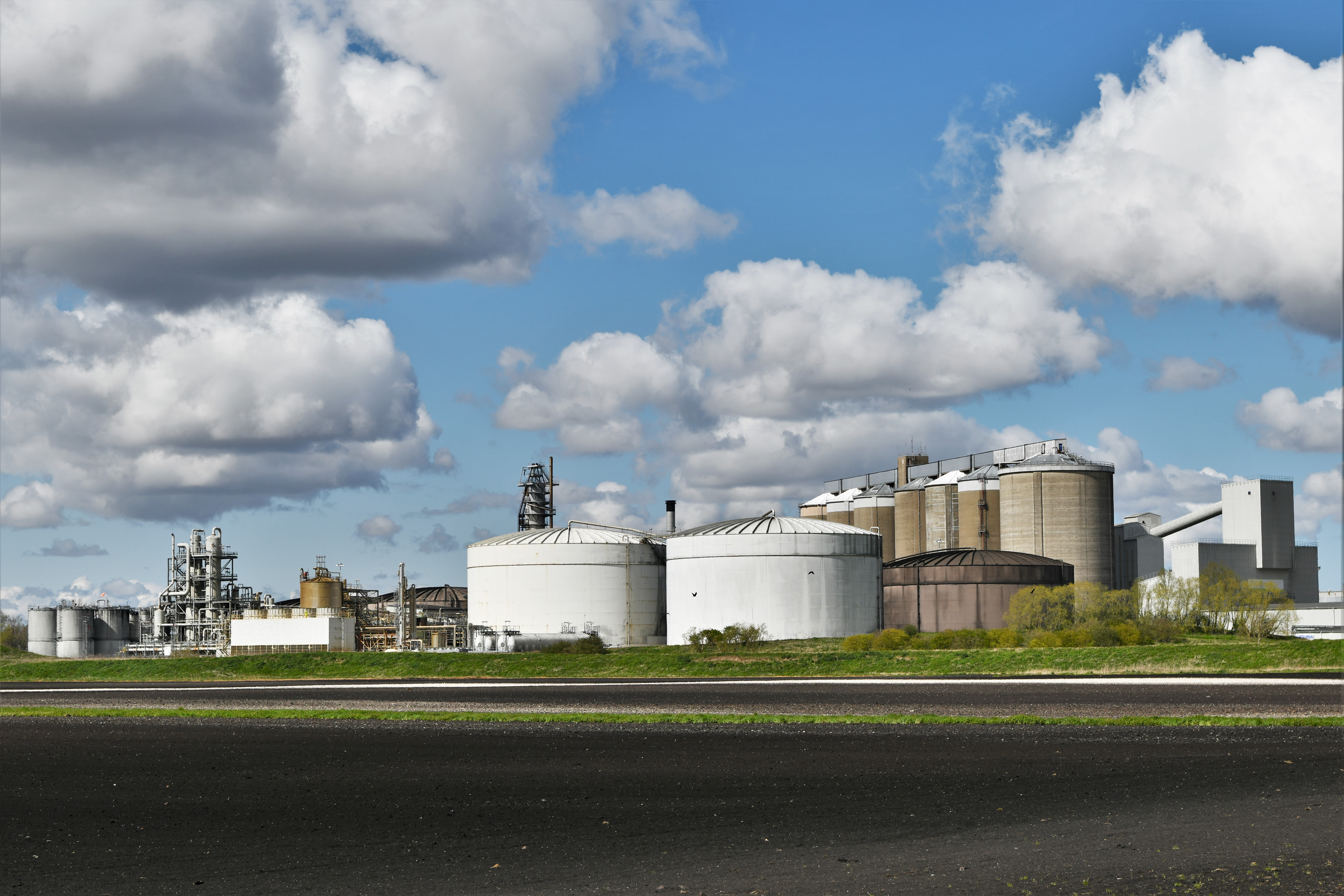
Wissington Sugar Factory in Norfolk

British Sugar plc is a subsidiary of Associated British Foods and the sole British middle-man and producer of sugar from sugar beet.

== History ==
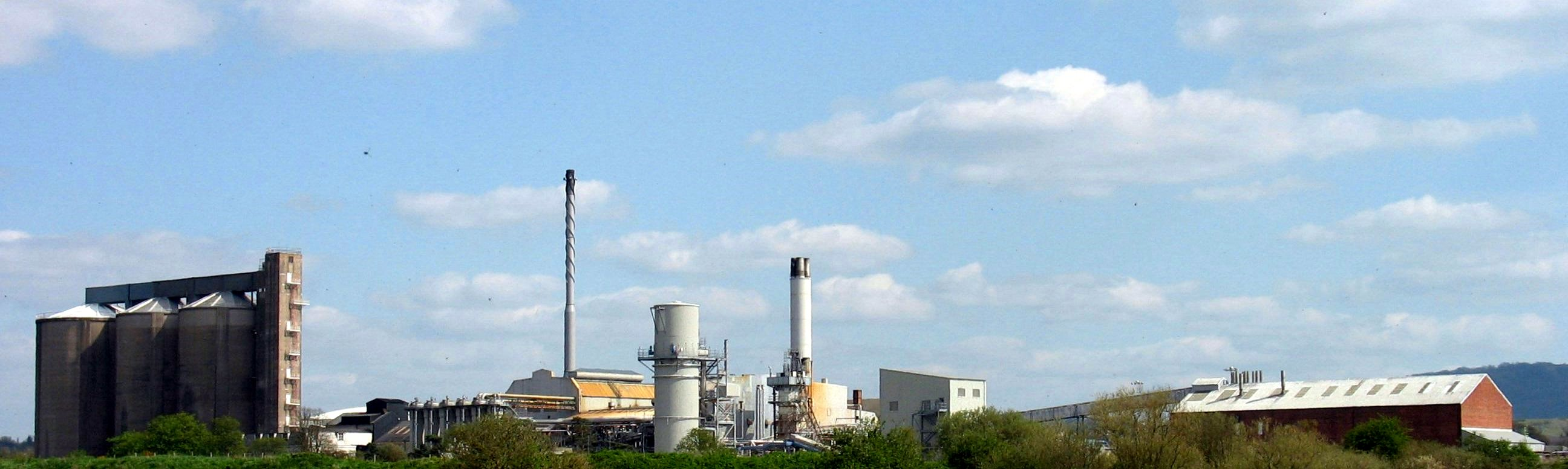
The facility at Allscott, Shropshire, closed in early 2007, and has since been demolished.

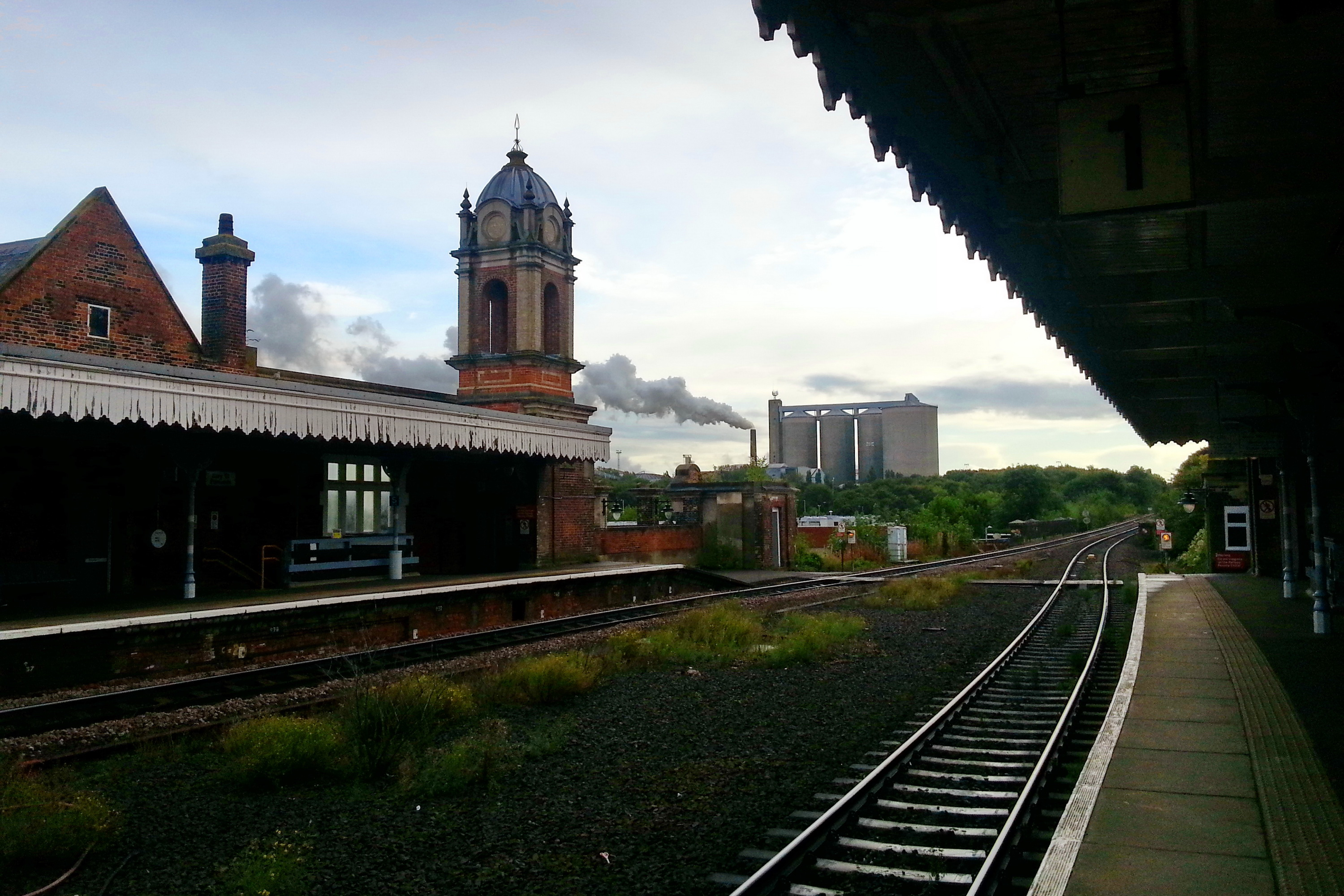
British Sugar factory at Bury St Edmunds seen behind the town's railway station

=== Early history ===
Sugar Industry (Reorganisation) Act 1936 (Note: Section 33(1).)
- Act of Parliament
- Parliament of the United Kingdom
- Long title: An Act to provide for the establishment of a Sugar Commission; for the amalgamation into a single corporation of companies manufacturing sugar from home-grown beet; for granting financial assistance to that corporation and to the companies aforesaid; and otherwise for the reorganization of the sugar industry.
- Citation: 26 Geo. 5 & 1 Edw. 8. c. 18
- Territorial extent: England and Wales; Scotland; (Note: Section 33(2).)

Dates
- Royal assent: 21 May 1936
- Commencement: 21 May 1936 (Note: The Acts of Parliament (Commencement) Act 1793.)
- Repealed: 5 July 1956
Other legislation
Amended by	Customs and Excise Act 1952
Repealed by	Sugar Act 1956

Status: Repealed

Text of statute as originally enacted

The company was formed as the British Sugar Corporation in 1936, when the British Parliament nationalised the entire sugar beet crop processing industry via the Sugar Industry (Reorganisation) Act 1936 (26 Geo. 5 & 1 Edw. 8. c. 18). At this time, there were 13 separate companies with 18 factories across the country. In 1972, it began selling its sugar products under the name of Silver Spoon.

In 1977, a rights issue decreased the government holding from 36% to 24%. In May 1982, the company name was shortened to British Sugar plc, and later that year it was taken over by Berisford International.

After a crash in property values affected Berisford, it was sold to Associated British Foods (ABF) on 2 January 1991.

In 2004 the company took over independent sugar producers Billingtons, which was founded by Edward Billington and Son, as a tea and coffee trading company, in 1858.

=== Closures ===
The sugar refinery in Cupar, Fife, closed in 1971 ending the growth and processing of sugar beet in Scotland; in its heyday in the mid-1930s, 1,500 farmers supplied the Cupar factory. In 1981, the Ely, Felsted, Nottingham and Selby factories closed after a reduction in the allowed sugar quota. This was followed by the closure of sites at Spalding in 1989, Peterborough and Brigg in 1991, King's Lynn in 1994, Bardney and Ipswich in 2001, Kidderminster in 2002, and Allscott and York in 2007. The site at Allscott, which opened in 1927, near Telford, Shropshire, was closed because it "lacked scale" to be run economically, while the site at York, North Yorkshire (opened 1926), was closed due to the poor crop yields in northern England.

Of the 18 factories which were owned by the British Sugar Corporation, only four still process beet: Bury St Edmunds (Suffolk), Cantley (in Norfolk, the second and first successful British sugar factory in 1912), Newark-on-Trent (Nottinghamshire) and Wissington (western Norfolk and the largest in Europe). The Bury site is also a major packaging plant for Silver Spoon.

The 12 sites already closed have been sold and decommissioned to various degrees – many large concrete silos (for storing the major product, white granulated sugar) still remain even where the sites have been closed, including those at the Kidderminster factory which was closed in 2002 and sold off in 2006. The concrete silos at the Ipswich site were demolished in 2018, 17 years after the site closed. Allscott has now been completely demolished. Spalding has been replaced by Spalding Power Station. BP and DuPont are working with British Sugar to build a bioethanol plant at BP's Hull site, as described in an announcement made in June 2007.

In July 2026 British Sugar announced its intention to close their Cantley beet sugar factory in February 2027.

== Operations ==
British Sugar is effectively the sole buyer of all of the sugar beet grown in Britain. This output comes from around 2,300 beet growers throughout Britain. There is however a proposal to start growing sugar beet in Eastern Scotland again to produce bioethanol. British Sugar is a supplier of cannabis to GW Pharmaceuticals.

== Management ==
The former managing director, Paul Kenward, is married to the Conservative MP, former Health Secretary and current Shadow Secretary of State for Health Victoria Atkins. He has since been promoted to the parent company (ABF Sugar) as the CEO there.

== Neonicotinoid ==
Due to their environmental impact, neonicotinoids were banned for outdoor use in the UK in 2018. Yet, for four years in a row the former UK Government approved so-called 'emergency authorisations' made by British Sugar for the use of the highly damaging neonicotinoid, thiamethoxam, on sugar beet.
