= Minister of State for Prisons, Probation and Reducing Reoffending =

UK government position in the Ministry of Justice

- Royal Arms of His Majesty's Government

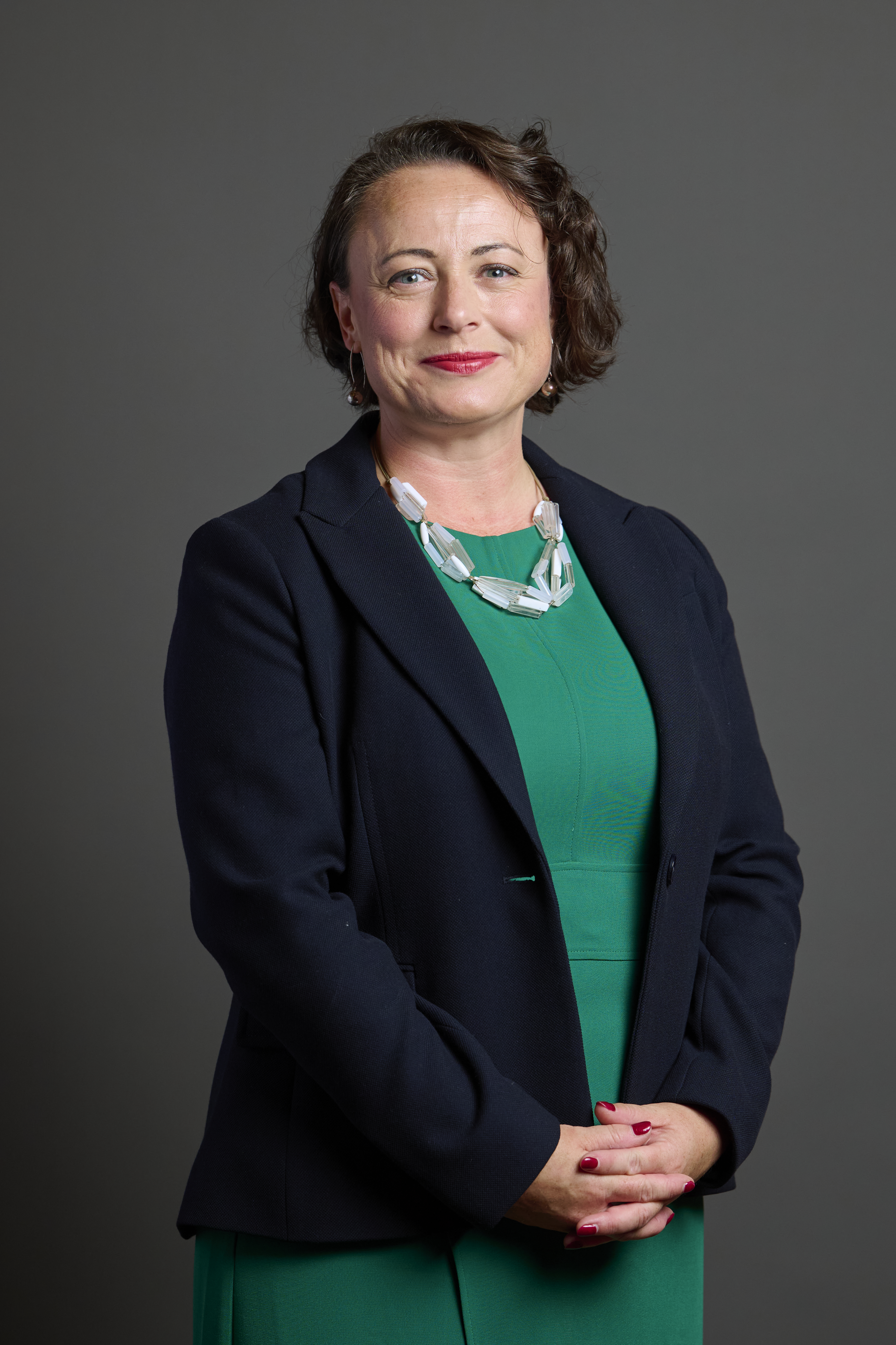
- Incumbent; Catherine McKinnell since 21 July 2026
- Ministry of Justice
- Seat: Westminster, London
- Appointer: The Monarch; on the advice of the Prime Minister
- Term length: At His Majesty's pleasure
- Website: www.gov.uk/government/ministers/minister-of-state-minister-for-prisons

The Minister of State for Prisons, Probation and Reducing Reoffending (or simply Prisons Minister) is a mid-level ministerial office in the Ministry of Justice.

Catherine McKinnell has held the office since July 2026.

== Responsibilities ==
The minister currently has responsibility of the following policy areas:

- Prison operations, policy, reform and industrial relations
- Probation policy and operations
- Youth justice
- Parole
- Offender health
- Offender Cohorts
- Extremism
- Home Detention Curfew (HDC)
- Release on Temporary Licence (ROTL) schemes
- Drugs
- Reducing reoffending
- Female offenders
- Foreign National Offenders

The minister also provides support on Global Britain and the promotion of legal services.

== List of ministers for prisons ==
Name	Portrait	Took office	Left office	Political party	Prime Minister
Position created out of Minister of State for Home Affairs Minister of State for Prisons
Ann Widdecombe; MP for Maidstone		28 February 1995	2 May 1997	Conservative	John Major (ll)
Joyce Quin; MP for Gateshead East and Washington West		2 May 1997	28 July 1998	Labour	Tony Blair (I)
Gareth Williams, Baron Williams of Mostyn		28 July 1998	28 July 1999	Labour	Tony Blair (I)
Charles Clarke; MP for Norwich South		July 1999	June 2001	Labour	Tony Blair (I)
Keith Bradley; MP for Manchester, Withington		June 2001	May 2002	Labour	Tony Blair (II)
Parliamentary Under-Secretary of State for Prisons and Probation
Hilary Benn; MP for Leeds Central		29 May 2002	13 May 2003	Labour	Tony Blair (II)
Parliamentary Under-Secretary of State for Criminal Justice, Race and Victims
Fiona Mactaggart; MP for Slough		13 June 2003	5 May 2006	Labour	Tony Blair (II+III)
Parliamentary Under-Secretary of State for Prisons and Probation Services
Gerry Sutcliffe; MP for Bradford South		5 May 2006	29 June 2007	Labour	Tony Blair (III)
Minister of State for Justice (in Ministry of Justice)
David Hanson MP for Delyn		2 July 2007	9 June 2009	Labour	Gordon Brown (I)
Maria Eagle MP for Liverpool Garston		9 June 2009	6 May 2010	Labour	Gordon Brown (I)
Parliamentary Under-Secretary of State for Prisons and Youth Justice
Crispin Blunt; MP for Reigate, Surrey		6 May 2010	4 September 2012	Conservative	David Cameron (Coalition)
Jeremy Wright; MP for Kenilworth and Southam		6 September 2012	15 July 2014	Conservative	David Cameron (Coalition)
Andrew Selous MP for South West Bedfordshire		16 July 2014	16 July 2016	Conservative	
Andrew Selous MP for South West Bedfordshire		16 July 2014	16 July 2016	Conservative	David Cameron (II)
Sam Gyimah; MP for East Surrey		17 July 2016	9 January 2018	Conservative	Theresa May (I)
Sam Gyimah; MP for East Surrey		17 July 2016	9 January 2018	Conservative	Theresa May (II)
Minister of State for Prisons
Rory Stewart; MP for Penrith and The Border		9 January 2018	1 May 2019	Conservative	Theresa May (II)
Robert Buckland; MP for South Swindon		9 May 2019	24 July 2019	Conservative	Theresa May (II)
Minister of State for Prisons and Probation
Lucy Frazer; MP for South East Cambridgeshire		25 July 2019	4 March 2021	Conservative	Boris Johnson (I)
Lucy Frazer; MP for South East Cambridgeshire		25 July 2019	4 March 2021	Conservative	Boris Johnson (II)
Alex Chalk; MP for Cheltenham		4 March 2021	10 September 2021	Conservative	Boris Johnson (II)
Lucy Frazer; MP for South East Cambridgeshire		10 September 2021	16 September 2021	Conservative	Boris Johnson (II)
Victoria Atkins; MP for Louth and Horncastle		16 September 2021	6 July 2022	Conservative	Boris Johnson (II)
Stuart Andrew; MP for Pudsey		8 July 2022	7 September 2022	Conservative	Boris Johnson (II)
Parliamentary Under-Secretary of State for Prisons and Probation
Rob Butler; MP for Aylesbury		20 September 2022	27 October 2022	Conservative	Liz Truss (I)
Minister of State for Prisons, Parole and Probation
Damian Hinds; MP for East Hampshire		27 October 2022	13 November 2023	Conservative	Rishi Sunak (I)
Edward Argar; MP for Charnwood		14 November 2023	5 July 2024	Conservative	Rishi Sunak (I)
Minister of State for Prisons, Probation and Reducing Reoffending
James Timpson, Baron Timpson		5 July 2024	20 July 2026	Labour	Keir Starmer (I)
Catherine McKinnell; MP for Newcastle upon Tyne North		21 July 2026	Incumbent	Labour	Andy Burnham (I)

== See also ==
- Ministry of Justice (United Kingdom)
- His Majesty's Prison Service
