= Lucy Frazer =

British politician (born 1972)

The Right Honourable Lucy Frazer KC
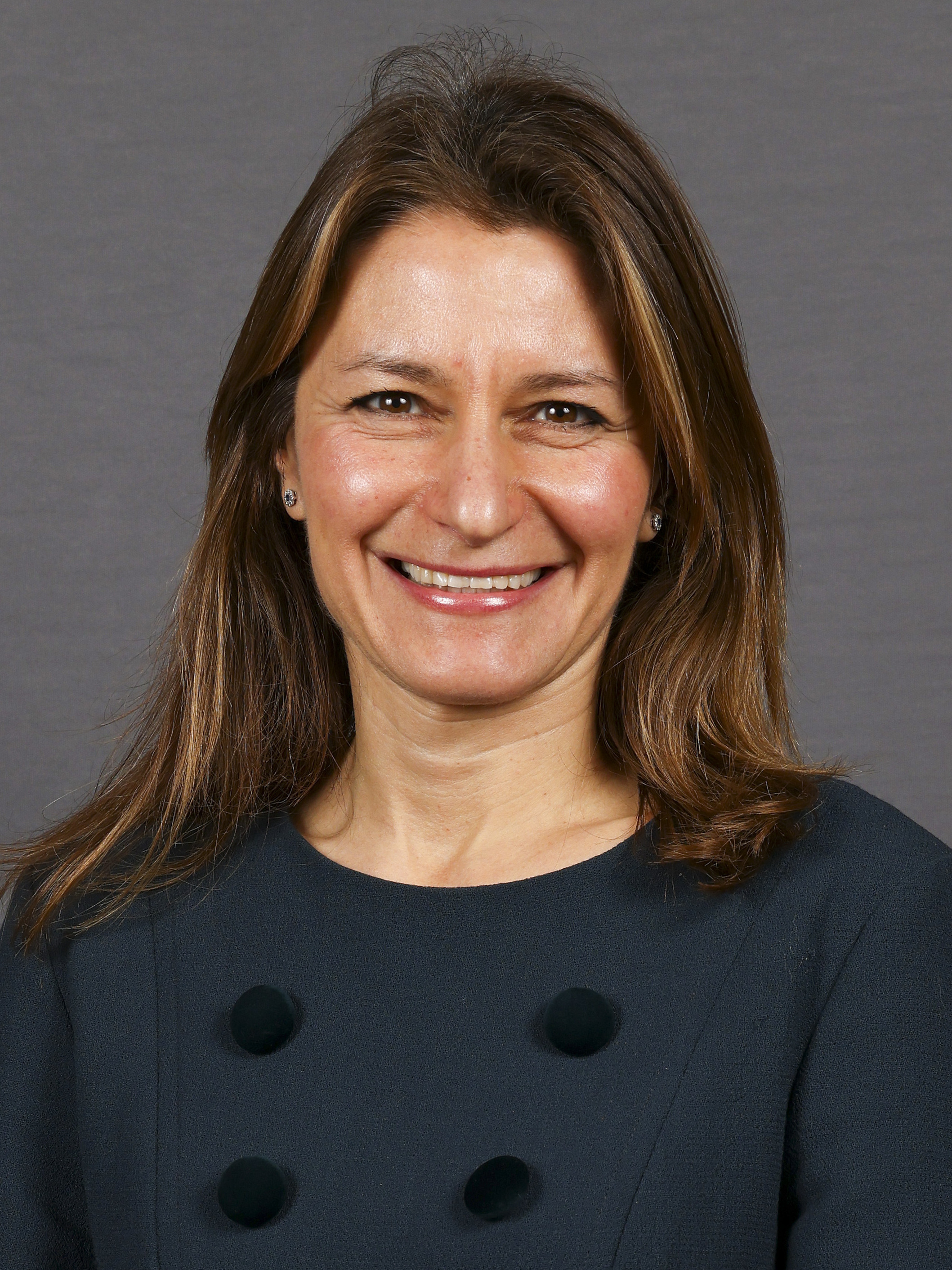
- Official portrait, 2023

Secretary of State for Culture, Media and Sport
- In office 7 February 2023 – 5 July 2024
- Prime Minister: Rishi Sunak
- Preceded by: Michelle Donelan
- Succeeded by: Lisa Nandy
Junior ministerial offices 2018‍–‍2023
Minister of State for Housing and Planning
In office 26 October 2022 – 7 February 2023
| Prime Minister | Rishi Sunak |
| Preceded by | Lee Rowley |
| Succeeded by | Rachel Maclean |
Minister of State for Transport
In office 8 September 2022 – 26 October 2022
| Prime Minister | Liz Truss |
| Preceded by | Trudy Harrison |
| Succeeded by | Jesse Norman |
Financial Secretary to the Treasury
In office 16 September 2021 – 7 September 2022
| Prime Minister | Boris Johnson |
| Preceded by | Jesse Norman |
| Succeeded by | Andrew Griffith |
Minister of State for Prisons and Probation
In office 10 September 2021 – 16 September 2021
| Prime Minister | Boris Johnson |
| Preceded by | Alex Chalk |
| Succeeded by | Victoria Atkins |
In office 25 July 2019 – 2 March 2021
| Prime Minister | Boris Johnson |
| Preceded by | Robert Buckland |
| Succeeded by | Alex Chalk |
Solicitor General for England and Wales
In office 2 March 2021 – 10 September 2021 (Note: In accordance with the Ministerial and other Maternity Allowances Act 2021, Frazer temporarily served as Solicitor General whilst Michael Ellis was elevated to Attorney General during Suella Braverman's maternity leave.)
| Prime Minister | Boris Johnson |
| Preceded by | Michael Ellis |
| Succeeded by | Michael Ellis |
In office 9 May 2019 – 25 July 2019
| Prime Minister | Theresa May |
| Preceded by | Robert Buckland |
| Succeeded by | Michael Ellis |
Parliamentary Under-Secretary of State for Justice
In office 9 January 2018 – 9 May 2019
| Prime Minister | Theresa May |
| Preceded by | Dominic Raab |
| Succeeded by | Paul Maynard |

Member of Parliament for South East Cambridgeshire
- In office 7 May 2015 – 30 May 2024
- Preceded by: Jim Paice
- Succeeded by: Constituency abolished

Personal details
- Born: 17 May 1972 (age 54) Yorkshire, England
- Party: Conservative
- Education: Newnham College, Cambridge
- Occupation: Politician; barrister
- Website: lucyfrazer.org.uk

Lucy Claire Frazer KC (born 17 May 1972) is a British politician and barrister who served as Secretary of State for Culture, Media and Sport from February 2023 to July 2024. A member of the Conservative Party, she served as the Member of Parliament (MP) for South East Cambridgeshire from 2015 to 2024.

Frazer previously served as Solicitor General for England and Wales, Minister of State for Prisons and Probation, Minister of State for Transport and Minister of State for Housing and Planning. Prior to being elected to Parliament, she practised as a barrister, becoming a Queen's Counsel in 2013.

== Early life and education ==
Born on 17 May 1972 in Yorkshire, Frazer is descended from Jewish immigrants. Her grandfather Dr Hyman Frazer was headmaster of Gateway Grammar School in Leicester.

Frazer was privately educated at Gateways School for Girls and Leeds Girls' High School, before studying Law at Newnham College, Cambridge, where she was elected President of the Cambridge Union.

== Pre-parliamentary career ==
After graduating, Frazer interned at the Israeli Ministry of Justice. Before entering politics, Frazer worked as a barrister in commercial law in London, practising in South Square Chambers, Gray's Inn; she was appointed Queen's Counsel at the age of 40.

== Parliamentary career ==
Frazer was selected as the Conservative Prospective Parliamentary candidate for South East Cambridgeshire in December 2013, despite claims that she had been beaten in an open primary by Heidi Allen, who was later elected as MP for South Cambridgeshire. Frazer succeeded in being elected at the 2015 general election with 28,845 votes (48.5%), a majority of 16,837. After entering the House of Commons, she was then elected to the Education Select Committee later that year.

Frazer supported the UK remaining within the European Union prior to the 2016 referendum. In July 2016, she became Parliamentary Private Secretary to the Paymaster General and Minister for the Cabinet Office, Ben Gummer.

At the snap 2017 general election, Frazer was re-elected, increasing her share of the vote to 53.3% and decreasing her majority to 16,158.

Frazer put forward a Private Member's Bill to Parliament for making upskirting an offence in England and Wales; this attained Royal Assent on 12 February 2019.

Frazer was appointed Parliamentary Under-Secretary of State for Justice in January 2018, before being promoted Solicitor General for England and Wales in May 2019.

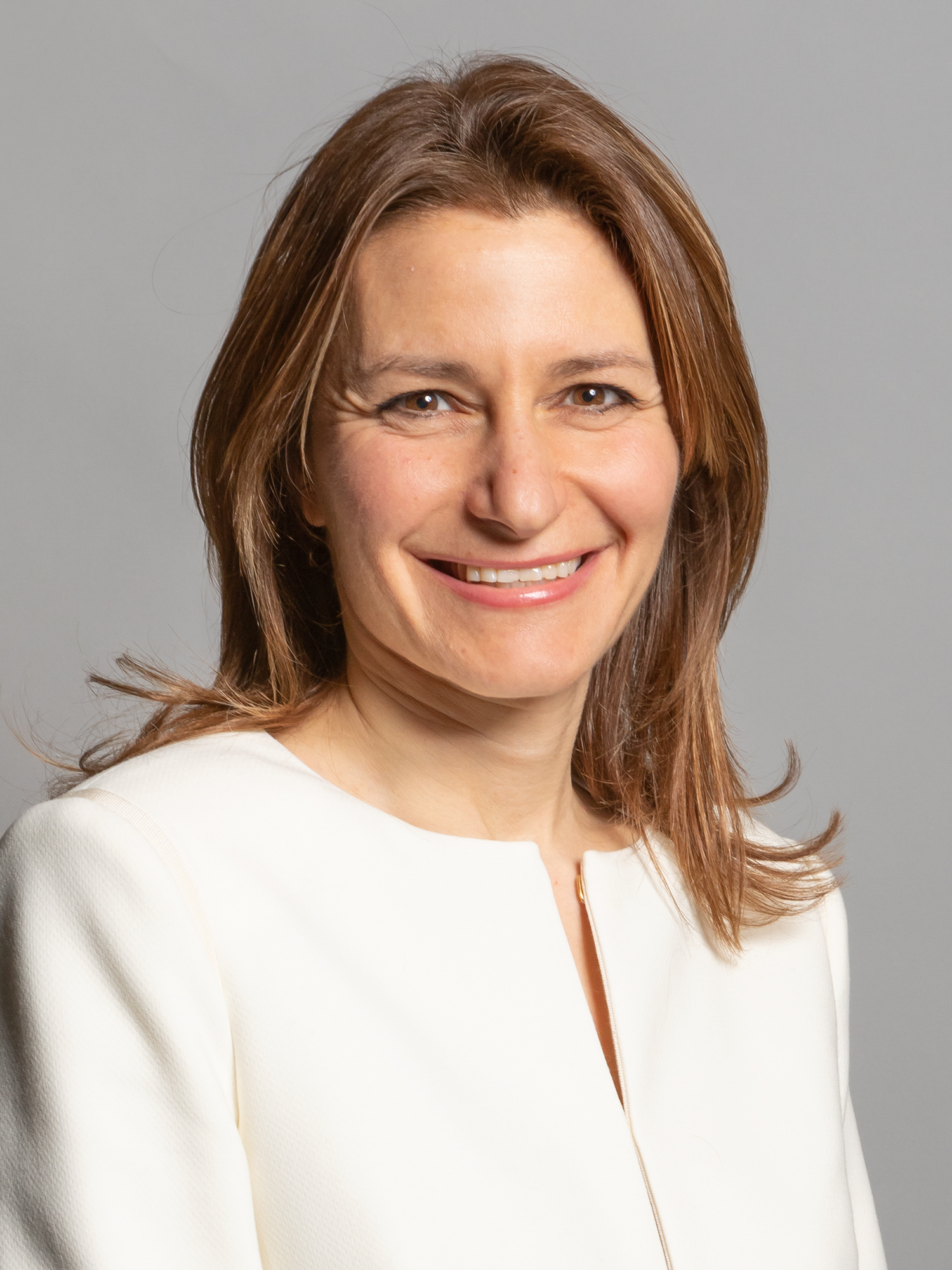
Frazer's official portrait, 2019

On 25 July 2019, Prime Minister Boris Johnson appointed Frazer as Minister of State for Prisons. She was then temporarily reappointed as Solicitor General when Suella Braverman took maternity leave in March 2021, being sworn of the Privy Council. Frazer returned to her role as Minister of State for Prisons upon Braverman's return on 10 September 2021.

At the 2019 general election, Frazer was again re-elected, decreasing her share of the vote to 50% and decreasing her majority to 11,490.

On 16 September 2021, Frazer was promoted Financial Secretary to the Treasury.

In November 2021, the Liberal Democrat MP, Sarah Olney, claimed that Frazer had a conflict of interest because of a contract held by her husband's company to supply temporary staff to government departments and that six of these workers had been employed using a "controversial tax-avoidance scheme".

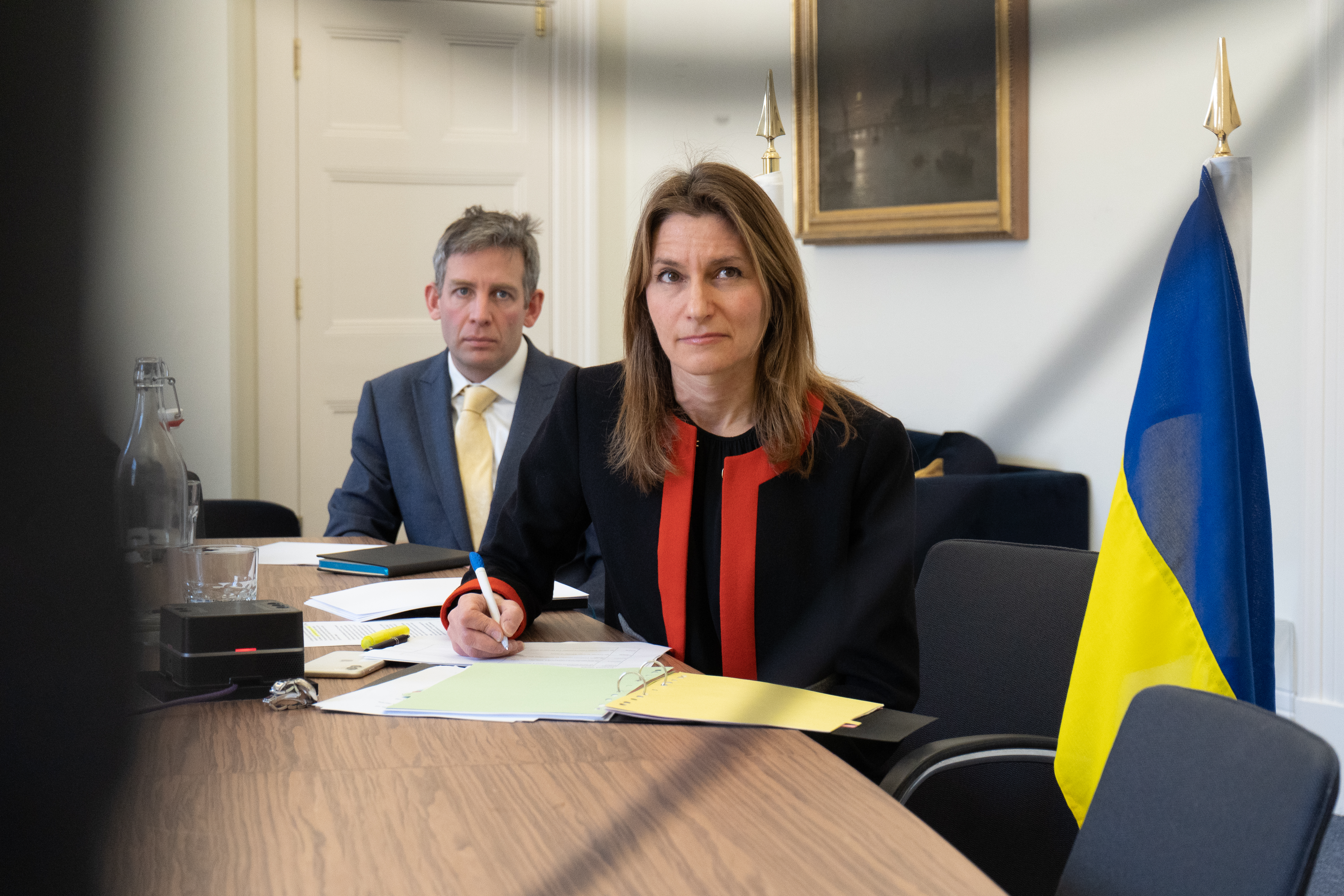
UK Culture Secretary Lucy Frazer chairs a summit of 36 nations to discuss Russian and Belarusian athletes' participation in the Paris Olympics 2024 with an address from Ukraine President Volodymyr Zelenskyy, 10 February 2022. This is despite the fact she was not DCMS Secretary at the time.

In June 2022, Frazer declared her support for Johnson in the 2022 vote of confidence in his Conservative Party leadership.

Frazer served as Minister of State for Transport from September to October 2022.

On 26 October 2022, following the election of Rishi Sunak as Prime Minister, Frazer was appointed Minister of State for Housing and Planning. In the February 2023 Cabinet reshuffle, Frazer joined HM Cabinet as Secretary of State for Culture, Media and Sport.

Following the 2023 local elections, Frazer appeared on the BBC Sunday with Laura Kuenssberg programme saying her party needs to "reflect" upon the poor results.

Her South East Cambridgeshire constituency was abolished at the 2024 general election, when she stood as a candidate for the new Ely and East Cambridgeshire constituency, which covers much of the same area. She lost her seat to the Liberal Democrat Charlotte Cane by a slim margin of 495 votes (0.9%).

== Post-parliamentary career ==
Following her defeat at the 2024 general election, Frazer was appointed as a senior adviser at the management consultancy firm McKinsey & Company.

== See also ==
- List of presidents of the Cambridge Union
- Department for Culture, Media and Sport

Parliament of the United Kingdom
| Preceded by Jim Paice | Member of Parliament for South East Cambridgeshire; 2015–2024 | Constituency abolished |
Political offices
| Preceded by Dominic Raab | Parliamentary Under-Secretary of State for Justice; 2018–2019 | Succeeded by Paul Maynard |
| Preceded by Robert Buckland | Solicitor General for England and Wales; 2019 | Succeeded by Michael Ellis |
| Preceded by Robert Buckland | Minister of State for Prisons and Probation; 2019–2021 | Succeeded by Alex Chalk |
| Preceded by Michael Ellis | Solicitor General for England and Wales; Acting; 2021 | Succeeded by Michael Ellis |
| Preceded by Alex Chalk | Minister of State for Prisons and Probation; 2021 | Succeeded by Victoria Atkins |
| Preceded by Jesse Norman | Financial Secretary to the Treasury; 2021–2022 | Succeeded by Andrew Griffith |
| Preceded by Trudy Harrison | Minister of State for Transport; 2022 | Succeeded by Jesse Norman |
| Preceded by Lee Rowley as Parliamentary Under-Secretary of State for Housing | Minister of State for Housing and Planning; 2022–2023 | Succeeded by Rachel Maclean |
| Preceded by Michelle Donelan | Secretary of State for Culture, Media and Sport; 2023–2024 | Succeeded by Lisa Nandy |
