= Paul Kenward =

English businessman (born 1973)

- Born: Paul Robert Kenward; 1973 (age 52–53); Royal Borough of Greenwich, London, England
- Education: Dr Challoner's Grammar School
- Alma mater: Lady Margaret Hall, Oxford (University of Oxford)
- Occupation: Businessman
- Employer: British Sugar
- Known for: President of the Oxford Union (Trinity term 1996)
- Title: Managing director of British Sugar
- Spouse: Victoria Atkins

Paul Robert Kenward (born 1973) is an English businessman, managing director of British Sugar and a director of several other companies.

== Early life ==
Born in the Royal Borough of Greenwich, Kenward was educated at Dr Challoner's Grammar School in Buckinghamshire, where he won academic prizes. He later attended Lady Margaret Hall, Oxford, and was President of the Oxford Union in the Trinity term of 1996.

== Career ==
Kenward's directorships include British Sugar, Pride Oils PLC, Westmill Foods, BE International Foods, Mitra Sugar, Davjon Food and various others.

In May 2018 it was reported that Kenward was operating Britain's largest legal cannabis farm. His company produces a non-psychoactive variety of the drug which is used in children's epilepsy medicine. His wife, the Conservative minister Victoria Atkins, announced that she would no longer be speaking for the government on cannabis and some other aspects of her drugs brief, with the Home Office commenting that she had "voluntarily recused herself from policy or decisions relating to cannabis".

== Personal life ==
He is the husband of the British Conservative MP Victoria Atkins.
