= Minister of State for Refugees =

UK Home Office Minister

- Royal Arms of His Majesty's Government
- Incumbent; Vacant since 4 September 2022
- Home Office; Department for Levelling Up, Housing and Communities
- Seat: Westminster, London
- Appointer: The Monarch on the advice of the Prime Minister
- Term length: At His Majesty's pleasure
- Website: https://www.gov.uk/government/ministers/minister-of-state-minister-for-refugees

The Minister of State for Refugees was a ministerial office jointly in the Home Office and the Department for Levelling Up, Housing and Communities created in the 2021 cabinet reshuffle. Originally it was created as Minister for Afghan Resettlement.

== Responsibilities ==
The current minister has following responsibilities:

- Ukraine Family Scheme
- Homes for Ukraine
- Afghan Citizens Resettlement Scheme
- Afghan Relocation and Assistance Policy
- Hong Kong BN(O)

== List of ministers ==
Minister	Term of office		Party	Ref
Victoria Atkins	18 September 2021	8 March 2022	Conservative	
Richard Harrington, Baron Harrington of Watford	8 March 2022	4 September 2022	Conservative	
