= Richard Harrington, Baron Harrington of Watford =

British Conservative politician (born 1957)

The Right Honourable The Lord Harrington of Watford
- Official portrait, 2026

Minister of State for Refugees (Note: Parliamentary Under-Secretary of State for Syrian Refugees from 2015 to 2016.)
- In office 8 March 2022 – 4 September 2022
- Prime Minister: Boris Johnson
- Preceded by: Victoria Atkins (Note: As Minister for Afghan Resettlement.)
- Succeeded by: Office abolished
- In office 14 September 2015 – 17 July 2016
- Prime Minister: David Cameron
- Preceded by: Office established
- Succeeded by: Victoria Atkins (Note: As Minister for Afghan Resettlement. Office vacant between 17 July 2016 and 16 September 2021.)

Parliamentary Under-Secretary of State for Business and Industry
- In office 14 June 2017 – 25 March 2019
- Prime Minister: Theresa May
- Preceded by: Jesse Norman
- Succeeded by: Andrew Stephenson

Parliamentary Under-Secretary of State for Pensions
- In office 17 July 2016 – 14 June 2017
- Prime Minister: Theresa May
- Preceded by: The Baroness Altmann
- Succeeded by: Guy Opperman

Member of the House of Lords
- Lord Temporal
- Life peerage 15 March 2022

Member of Parliament for Watford
- In office 6 May 2010 – 6 November 2019
- Preceded by: Claire Ward
- Succeeded by: Dean Russell

Personal details
- Born: 4 November 1957 (age 69) Leeds, England
- Party: Non-affiliated (from 2024)
- Other political affiliations: Conservative Party (until 2024)
- Spouse: Jessica Lee
- Education: Keble College, Oxford
- Website: Official website

Richard Irwin Harrington, Baron Harrington of Watford (born 4 November 1957) is a non-affiliated member of the House of Lords and businessman. From 2010 until 2019, he was the Member of Parliament (MP) for Watford. He was the Minister for Business and Industry from June 2017 to March 2019. Harrington had the Conservative whip removed on 3 September 2019, but on 29 October he was one of ten MPs to have it restored.

On 8 March 2022, Harrington was appointed Minister of State for Refugees, with his ministerial portfolio being in charge of co-ordinating the UK's response to the humanitarian crisis caused by Russia's invasion of Ukraine. He was also elevated to the House of Lords after being given a Life Peerage. In August 2022, the government announced that, under Harrington's leadership, a total of 104,000 Ukrainian war refugees had been given safe refuge in the UK. On 4 September 2022, Harrington stepped down from the role, having completed the task of putting in place a permanent system for arrivals.

In November 2022, he was awarded the Spectator Magazine's 'Peer of the Year' Award at its annual Parliamentarian of the Year Awards. The following month he was also listed on the Sunday Times Alternative Honours list for his work settling Ukrainian refugees.

Chancellor of the Exchequer, the Rt Hon Jeremy Hunt asked Harrington in April 2023 to lead a review of the government's approach to attracting foreign direct investment into the UK.

== Early life ==
Harrington was born on 4 November 1957 in Leeds to a British Jewish family. His father sold clothes from a market stall and a shop. He was educated at Leeds Grammar School, going up in 1976 to Keble College, Oxford University, where he studied jurisprudence. While at Oxford, he sat on the executive board of the Federation of Conservative Students and was a member of the National Union Executive of the Party. He began his career in business with a graduate scheme at the John Lewis Partnership, where he eventually became the assistant to the managing director of Waitrose; this included a period working at Trewins Department Store in Watford.

== Career ==
In 1983, he founded Harvington Properties, a property development company, with two friends from university. In 1990, Harrington became a shareholder and managing director of LSI Leisure Syndicates International a company active in the development, sales and management of holiday resorts in both the UK and Europe. The company was sold to a listed American company at the end of the decade and is now owned by Hilton Hotels. Other notable work in property development included the restoration of one of Glasgow's most famous hotels, One Devonshire Gardens.

Before he became a minister, Harrington was Vice Chairman of the Conservative Party and was David Cameron's Apprenticeship Advisor and Chairman of the Apprenticeship Delivery Board.

Harrington supports a range of charities and has been a trustee of the Variety Club Children's Society. He is also trustee of several charities in Watford. Harrington also serves as a Trustee of Royal Albert Hall.

== Post Commons Career ==
After stepping down from the House of Commons in 2019, Harrington resumed his business career, taking on the role of Chair and Senior Advisor at APCO Worldwide. The appointment ceased when he was appointed a Minister in the House of Lords.

Harrington was appointed by the Prime Minister to the post of Minister of State for Refugees on 8 March 2022, working across both the Department for Levelling Up, Housing and Communities and the Home Office, as part of the Response to the Russian Invasion of Ukraine. He was made a life peer with the name, style and title of Baron Harrington of Watford, of Watford in the County of Hertfordshire, on 15 March 2022.

In March 2023, the Chancellor, Rt Hon Jeremy Hunt, asked Harrington to chair a review into Foreign Direct Investment.

== Post 2022 Business Career ==
In 2024 Lord Harrington took roles at law firm Stephenson Harwood LLP. He became chair of Regal, one of London's largest up market residential developers and oversaw its sale to Arada for £150m.

In March 2026, Lord Harrington was appointed Chairman of GeoPura, a UK based pioneer of hydrogen technology. He oversaw the investment of £275m by Ballard Power Inc, a Nasdaq listed Canadian company. Harrington joined the Board of the parent company in August 2026.

In early 2025 he took up the position of Chair of MAKE UK, the UK's largest trade body, with 26,000 members and 3 operating divisions providing legal services, apprenticeships and other services for its members. Harrington is active in the representation of the sector with the UK government.

In September 2024 he served a term as Advisory Board Chair of the UK Real Estate Investment and Infrastructure Forum (UKREiiF).

In May 2025, Harrington was approached to join the board of Shein ahead of its potential stock market float.

He remains a director and shareholder of Harvington Properties Ltd.

== Politics ==
Harrington was a long-time member of the Conservative Party since 1983. Until March 2010, he was chairman of the executive board of the Conservative Friends of Israel, which, during his tenure, had quadrupled in size financially. He was appointed a treasurer of the Conservative Party in 2008, the role in which he launched the Number 10 Club with Sir John Major.

Harrington won the Watford seat from Claire Ward at the 2010 general election with a majority of 1,425 votes. He was the first of the new MPs elected at the 2010 general election to make his maiden speech in the Commons.

Since his election to Parliament, Harrington has also been elected as General Secretary of the All Party Parliamentary Kashmir Group (until 2015), Vice Chairman of the All Party Parliamentary Film Industry Group, and a member of the International Development Select Committee between July 2010 - November 2012. He has run a number of successful community projects in Watford including six jobs fairs and a Community Exchange. His main areas of interest are cutting local unemployment, supporting business in the constituency and progressing the significant infrastructure projects in Watford including the redeveloping Watford Junction and the Watford Health Campus. In September 2012, Harrington was appointed as a Vice Chairman of the Conservative Party. In the 2012-13 Parliamentary Session, Harrington successfully brought in a Private Members Bill to criminalise the unlawful subletting of social housing property.

In May 2015, Harrington was re-elected as the Member of Parliament for Watford, with a majority of 9,794 votes, increasing the Conservative share of the vote by 8.5%. A month later, in June 2015, Harrington was appointed as the Prime Minister's apprenticeships adviser.

Harrington was appointed Parliamentary Under Secretary of State at the Department for Work and Pensions in Theresa May's first Cabinet reshuffle on 17 July 2016, with his former position left vacant and effectively abolished.

At the 2017 snap general election, Harrington was re-elected with a reduced majority of 2,092 votes. Harrington was moved to the Department for Business, Energy and Industrial Strategy in the subsequent Cabinet reshuffle.

Having helped secure Government funding for the Croxley Rail Link Harrington expressed frustration with Labour's Sadiq Khan, the Mayor of London, for not progressing the project in February 2018; despite Harrington securing an extra £73,000,000 of government funding. In response Labour representatives argued that central government funding should have been provided for a project located outside of London and that "a more balanced approach, seeking the Department for Transport and TfL to work closely together is what is needed".

In early-2019, Harrington warned of the risks of a no-deal Brexit. On 25 March 2019, he resigned from the government to vote for Oliver Letwin's amendment.

On 29 August 2019, Harrington announced via Twitter that he would not stand for re-election in the next general election.

=== Ministerial career ===
September 2015-July 2016: Parliamentary Under Secretary of State for Department for International Development jointly with Home Office and Department for Communities and Local Government

Harrington was appointed by David Cameron as the Minister responsible for the Syrian Refugee programme, and was the first ever government minister in three departments at the same time (Home Office, Communities and International development), where he implemented his ideas for cross government working. The programme led to the successful resettlement of 20,000 people.

In March 2022, having stood down from parliament in 2019, Harrington was appointed by the Prime Minister to the post of Minister of State for refugees from Ukraine, as a joint minister across the Home Office and Department for Levelling Up. His Homes for Ukraine Scheme led to the settlement of more than 150,000 refugees in the UK.

July 2016-June 2017: Parliamentary Under Secretary of State, Department for Work and Pensions

In July 2016 to June 2017, Harrington became Pensions Minister at the Department for Work and Pensions, with a brief to develop and implement the auto enrolment system for workplace pensions, which will transform the retirement of the vast amount of the working population in the future.

June 2017-March 2019: Parliamentary Under Secretary of State, Department for Business, Energy and Industrial Strategy

In June 2017, Harrington became a minister at the Department for Business, Energy and Industrial Strategy. For a year he was Energy Minister, where he developed an interest in nuclear and renewable technologies. In 2018 he became Business and Industry Minister in the same department and covered a wide range of business sectors, such as life sciences, automotives, aerospace, professional services and creative industries. His role was to develop partnerships between government and the private sector- the life sciences sector deal was the first and several followed like creative industries, aerospace, automotive and others, all of which have led to significant investment from government and private industry alike.

=== The Harrington Review of Foreign Direct Investment ===
In March 2023, the Chancellor, Rt Hon Jeremy Hunt, asked Harrington to chair a review into Foreign Direct Investment. In the course of this, he and his team from two government departments, interviewed more than 200 companies, sovereign wealth funds, pension funds and trade bodies. This led to its publication in November 2023 with a series of recommendations reorganising the government in a cross department, investment friendly way.

It was accepted by the Chancellor at the Autumn Statement and was accepted by Rt Hon Jonathan Reynolds, the Shadow Secretary of State for Business. It was launched at Bloomberg to an audience of 150 business people. It is currently being implemented across government.

=== House of Lords ===
Harrington was appointed by the Prime Minister to the post of Minister of State for Refugees on 8 March 2022, working across both the Department for Levelling Up, Housing and Communities and the Home Office, as part of the Response to the Russian Invasion of Ukraine.

He was made a life peer with the name, style and title of Baron Harrington of Watford, of Watford in the County of Hertfordshire, on 15 March 2022. He was introduced to the House of Lords on the same day. Initially sitting as a Conservative peer, he has been a non-affiliated peer since 18 August 2024.

He obtained a grant of arms from the Garter King of Arms, David Vines White, on 14 April 2023.

== Personal life ==
In 2022, Harrington married Jessica Lee, a former Conservative MP.

== Notes ==
Parliament of the United Kingdom
Preceded by Claire Ward	Member of Parliament for Watford; 2010–2019	Succeeded by Dean Russell
Orders of precedence in the United Kingdom
Preceded by The Lord Offord of Garvel	Gentlemen; Baron Harrington of Watford	Followed by The Lord Bellamy
