= Oxford University LGBTQ+ Society =

Student society at the University of Oxford

- Formation: 1975
- Members: 3000+

Oxford University LGBTQ+ Society is a student society at the University of Oxford. It provides welfare support and holds events for LGBTQ+ students and alumni of the University of Oxford and Oxford Brookes, and other community members in the city. The organisation is best known for holding Tuesgays, a weekly drinks event.

The organisation claims to be the largest student society at the University of Oxford, and the largest LGBTQ+ Society in the UK.

== History ==
The organisation was founded as GaySoc 1975, when an advert was placed in a student newspaper asking "anyone interested in helping establish a gay soc in Oxford please drop a line". Activities initially centred on Pembroke college, with events such as discussions, speakers, parties and theatre trips. The organisation rebranded to LGBSoc in 1995, LGBTsoc in 2007 to become explicitly trans-inclusive, LGBTQSoc in 2011 before its final, and current iteration LGBTQ+ Society, or OULGBTQ+, in 2017.

== Notable Events ==
=== Oxford Trans Pride ===
The Society released a statement in April 2023, condemning private members club The Oxford Union inviting allegedly transphobic speaker Kathleen Stock and asking for invite to be rescinded. The statement was reposted by Stock on Twitter, leading committee members and the society president to receive attacks and even death threats online and in the mail. The debate escalated, with more student societies announcing condemnations of the Oxford Union for the invite. Several groups of academics signed open letters, 44 Academics signing a letter in support of Stock, claiming her views were protected under 'free speech', which was responded to by a larger group of 100 academics raising concerns over the welfare of trans students in the city.

The society organised a protest along with other political organisations in the city (such as Oxford Pride), called Oxford Trans Pride, during the speakers attendance to the Union. Attendance was reportedly 500+ people and chants could be heard from within the chamber. During Stock's talk, an activist wearing a t-shirt with text 'No More Dead Trans Kids' glued themself to the floor of the chamber, disrupting the event, and was escorted out with cheers from the protesters.

The society has stated that Oxford Trans Pride will be an annual event.

=== Safe Churches Report ===
In 2023, the society again made headlines after releasing a report with the LGBTQ+ SU Campaign, founding 'Oxford Student Faith Action', which graded local churches and the Christian Union on their levels of LGBTQ+ Inclusion.
