= Hassan Yousef =

Hassan Yousef may refer to:

- Hassan Yousef (Hamas leader) (born 1955), leader of Hamas in the West Bank
- Hassan Yousef (Emirati footballer) (born 1992), Emirati footballer for Ittihad Kalba
- Hassan Youssef (actor) (1934–2024), Egyptian actor and director
- Hassan Youssef (Egyptian footballer) (born 1993), Egyptian footballer for Aswan SC
- Hassan Yousuf, Emirati association football player
