= July 2022 British cabinet reshuffle =

Last cabinet reshuffle undertaken by UK Prime Minister Boris Johnson

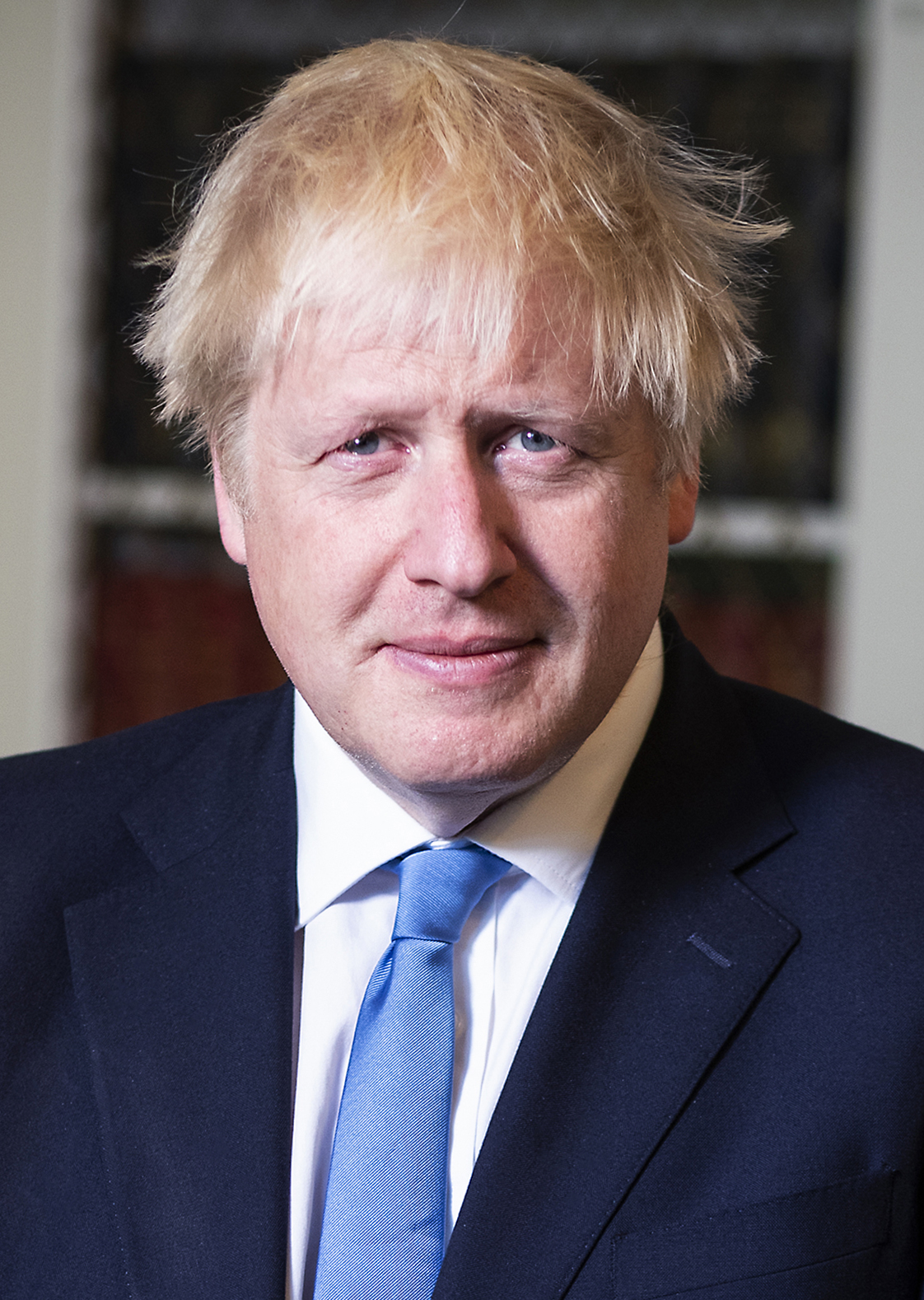
Johnson in 2019

Boris Johnson carried out the third significant reshuffle of his majority government (the Second Johnson ministry) from 5 to 8 July 2022, having last done so in September 2021. This was a direct result of the July 2022 United Kingdom government crisis in which more than a third of ministers and parliamentary private secretaries resigned from their positions.

Initial changes were made following the resignations of Rishi Sunak, Chancellor of the Exchequer, and Sajid Javid, Secretary of State for Health and Social Care, within hours of each other on 5 July. Nadhim Zahawi was appointed to replace Sunak and Stephen Barclay to replace Javid. Later changes were announced after it was announced that Johnson would resign as Leader of the Conservative Party, triggering a leadership election. Michelle Donelan resigned two days after being appointed to replace Nadhim Zahawi in his former role as Secretary of State for Education. Michael Gove had been dismissed by Johnson on 6 July due to perceived disloyalty to the Prime Minister. Simon Hart also resigned as Secretary of State for Wales on 6 July and Brandon Lewis resigned as Secretary of State for Northern Ireland on 7 July. Gove, Hart and Lewis were replaced by backbench MPs Greg Clark, Robert Buckland and Shailesh Vara respectively.

The ministry served as a caretaker government until Liz Truss was elected in the Conservative Party leadership election and was sworn in as prime minister.

== Cabinet-level changes ==
Colour key
- Joined the Cabinet
- Left the Cabinet

Minister	Position before reshuffle	Position after reshuffle
Rt Hon Sajid Javid MP	Secretary of State for Health and Social Care	Resigned from the government
Rt Hon Stephen Barclay MP	Chancellor of the Duchy of Lancaster; Downing Street Chief of Staff	Secretary of State for Health and Social Care
Rt Hon Kit Malthouse MP	Minister of State for Crime and Policing (Note: Attending Cabinet)	Chancellor of the Duchy of Lancaster
Rt Hon Rishi Sunak MP	Chancellor of the Exchequer	Resigned from the government
Rt Hon Nadhim Zahawi MP	Secretary of State for Education	Chancellor of the Exchequer
Rt Hon Michelle Donelan MP	Minister of State for Higher and Further Education	Secretary of State for Education
Rt Hon Michelle Donelan MP	Secretary of State for Education	Resigned from the government
Lt Col Rt Hon James Cleverly TD VR MP	Minister of State for Europe and North America	Secretary of State for Education
Rt Hon Michael Gove MP	Secretary of State for Levelling Up, Housing and Communities; Minister for Intergovernmental Relations	Dismissed from the government
Rt Hon Greg Clark MP	Backbench MP	Secretary of State for Levelling Up, Housing and Communities
Rt Hon Simon Hart MP	Secretary of State for Wales	Resigned from the government
Rt Hon Sir Robert Buckland KBE QC MP	Backbench MP	Secretary of State for Wales
Rt Hon Brandon Lewis MP	Secretary of State for Northern Ireland	Resigned from the government
Shailesh Vara MP	Backbench MP	Secretary of State for Northern Ireland
Andrew Stephenson MP	Minister of State for Transport	Minister without Portfolio; Chairman of the Conservative Party
Johnny Mercer MP	Backbench MP	Minister for Veterans’ Affairs

== Junior ministerial changes ==
Colour key
- Promoted (Note: According to the ministerial pay scale: Minister of State > Parliamentary Under-Secretary of State > Parliamentary Private Secretary)
- Left the government

Minister	Position before reshuffle	Position after reshuffle
Tom Pursglove MP	Parliamentary Under-Secretary of State for Justice and Tackling Illegal Migration	Minister of State for Crime and Policing
Simon Baynes MP	Backbench MP	Parliamentary Under-Secretary of State for Justice and Tackling Illegal Migration
Andrea Jenkyns MP	Assistant Government Whip	Parliamentary Under Secretary of State for Skills, Further and Higher Education
Graham Stuart MP	Backbench MP	Minister of State for Europe
Rehman Chishti MP	Backbench MP	Parliamentary Under Secretary of State for North America, Sanctions and Consular Policy
Trudy Harrison MP	Parliamentary Under-Secretary of State for Transport	Minister of State for Transport
Karl McCartney JP MP	Backbench MP	Parliamentary Under-Secretary of State for Transport
Leo Docherty MP	Parliamentary Under-Secretary of State for Defence People and Veterans	Minister for Defence People
Alex Chalk QC MP	Solicitor General for England and Wales	Resigned from the government
Edward Timpson CBE MP	Backbench MP	Solicitor General for England and Wales
Will Quince MP	Parliamentary Under-Secretary of State for Children and Families	Resigned from government
Brendan Clarke-Smith MP	Backbench MP	Parliamentary Under Secretary of State for Children and Families
Robin Walker MP	Minister of State for School Standards	Resigned from government
Will Quince MP	Backbench MP	Minister of State for School Standards
John Glen MP	Economic Secretary to the Treasury	Resigned from the government
Richard Fuller MP	Backbench MP	Economic Secretary to the Treasury
Stuart Andrew MP	Minister of State for Housing	Resigned from the government
Marcus Jones MP	Comptroller of the Household	Minister of State for Housing
Victoria Atkins MP	Minister of State for Prisons and Probation	Resigned from the government
Stuart Andrew MP	Backbench MP	Minister of State for Prisons and Probation
Jo Churchill MP	Parliamentary Under-Secretary of State for Agri-Innovation and Climate Adaptation	Resigned from the government
Kemi Badenoch MP	Minister of State for Local Government, Faith and Communities	Resigned from the government
Paul Scully MP	Parliamentary Under-Secretary of State for Small Business, Consumers and Labour Markets	Minister of State for Local Government, Faith and Communities
Jane Hunt MP	Parliamentary Private Secretary to the Cabinet Office	Parliamentary Under-Secretary of State for Small Business, Consumers and Labour Markets
Neil O'Brien OBE MP	Parliamentary Under-Secretary of State for Levelling Up, The Union and Constitution	Resigned from the government
Lia Nici MP	Parliamentary Private Secretary to the Prime Minister	Parliamentary Under-Secretary of State for Levelling Up, The Union and Constitution
Alex Burghart MP	Parliamentary Under-Secretary of State for Apprenticeships and Skills	Resigned from the government
Lee Rowley MP	Parliamentary Under-Secretary of State for Business and Industry	Resigned from the government
Julia Lopez MP	Minister of State for Media, Data, and Digital Infrastructure	Resigned from the government
Matt Warman MP	Backbench MP	Minister of State for Media, Data, and Digital Infrastructure
Mims Davies MP	Parliamentary Under-Secretary of State for Employment	Resigned from the government
Julie Marson MP	Backbench MP	Parliamentary Under-Secretary of State for Employment
Rachel Maclean MP	Minister for Safeguarding	Resigned from the government
Amanda Solloway MP	Lord Commissioner of the Treasury	Minister for Safeguarding
Mike Freer MP	Parliamentary Under-Secretary of State for Exports	Resigned from the government
Andrew Griffith MP	Minister for Policy	Parliamentary Under-Secretary of State for Exports
Edward Argar MP	Minister of State for Health	Resigned from the government
Maria Caulfield MP	Parliamentary Under-Secretary of State for Patient Safety and Primary Care	Minister of State for Health
James Morris MP	Vice-Chamberlain of the Household	Parliamentary Under-Secretary of State for Patient Safety and Primary Care
Helen Whately MP	Exchequer Secretary to the Treasury	Resigned from the government
Alan Mak MP	Lord Commissioner of the Treasury	Exchequer Secretary to the Treasury
Rt Hon Damian Hinds MP	Minister of State for Security and Borders	Resigned from the government
Stephen McPartland MP	Backbench MP	Minister of State for Security
George Freeman MP	Parliamentary Under-Secretary of State for Science, Research and Innovation	Resigned from the government
Guy Opperman MP	Parliamentary Under-Secretary of State for Pensions and Financial Inclusion	Resigned from the government
Guy Opperman MP	Backbench MP	Parliamentary Under-Secretary of State for Pensions and Financial Inclusion
Chris Philp MP	Parliamentary Under-Secretary of State for Tech and the Digital Economy	Resigned from the government
Damian Collins MP	Backbench MP	Parliamentary Under-Secretary of State for Tech and the Digital Economy
James Cartlidge MP	Parliamentary Under-Secretary of State for Justice	Resigned from the government
Sarah Dines MP	Assistant Government Whip	Parliamentary Under-Secretary of State for Justice
Rebecca Pow MP	Parliamentary Under-Secretary of State for Nature Recovery and the Domestic Environment	Resigned from the government
Steve Double MP	Assistant Government Whip	Parliamentary Under-Secretary of State for Nature Recovery and the Domestic Environment
James Heappey MP	Parliamentary Under-Secretary of State for the Armed Forces	Minister of State for the Armed Forces
Peter Bone FCA MP	Backbench MP	Deputy Leader of the House of Commons
The Lord Greenhalgh	Minister of State for Building Safety and Fire	Resigned from the government

== Whips' Office appointments ==
Whip	Previous position	New position
Michael Tomlinson MP	Lord Commissioner of the Treasury	Vice-Chamberlain of the Household
Craig Whittaker MP	Backbench MP	Lord Commissioner of the Treasury
James Duddridge MP	Parliamentary Private Secretary to the Prime Minister	Lord Commissioner of the Treasury
Stuart Anderson MP	Backbench MP	Assistant Government Whip
Joy Morrissey MP	Parliamentary Private Secretary to the Prime Minister	Assistant Government Whip
Rt Hon Sir David Evennett MP	Backbench MP	Assistant Government Whip
Adam Holloway MP	Backbench MP	Assistant Government Whip
Suzanne Webb MP	Backbench MP	Assistant Government Whip
David Morris MP	Backbench MP	Assistant Government Whip

== See also ==
- Chris Pincher scandal
