= Second Cameron ministry =

Government of the United Kingdom (2015–2016)

- Cabinet of the United Kingdom
- 2015–2016
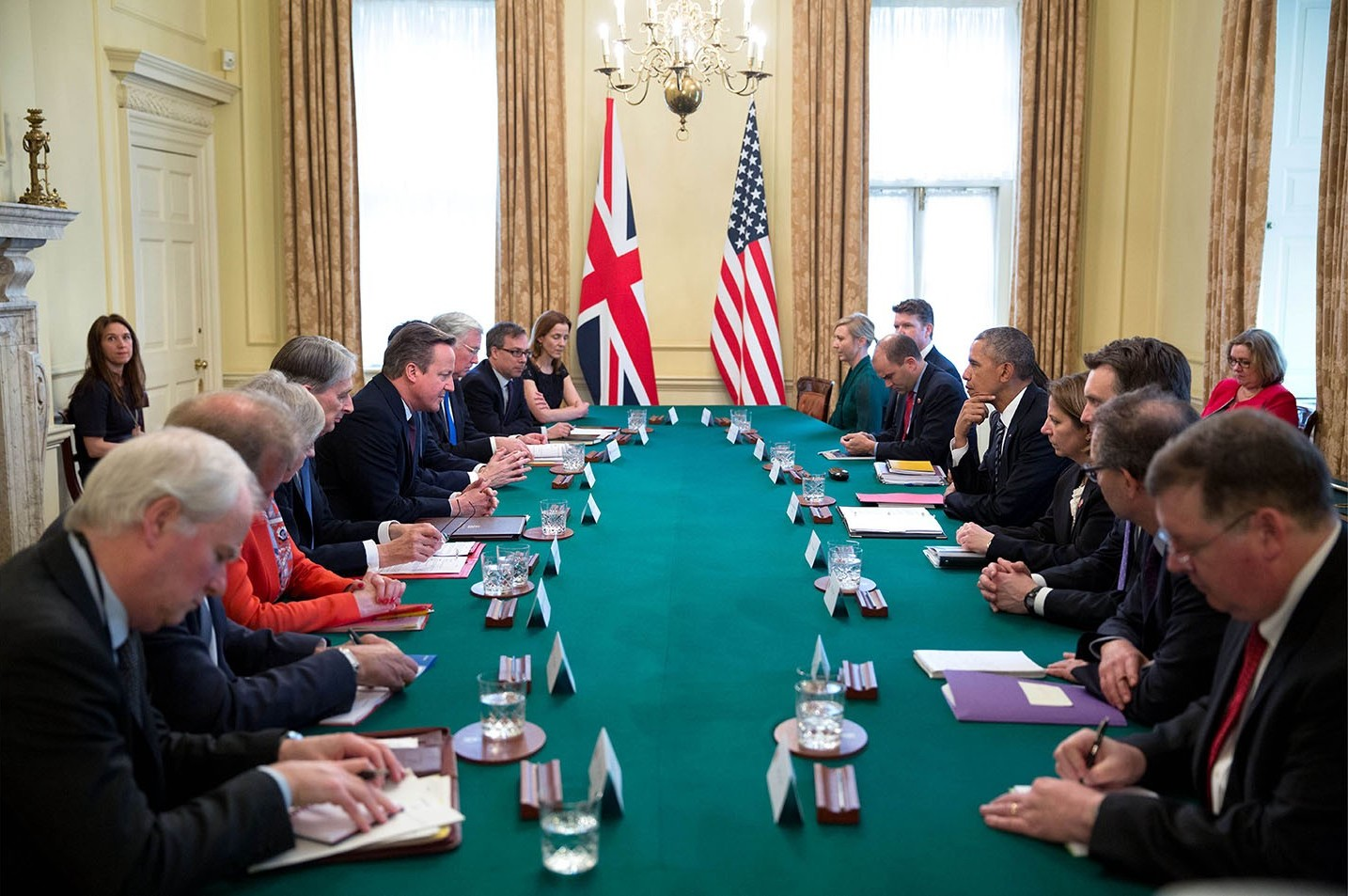
- President Barack Obama and Prime Minister David Cameron holding bilateral meetings in April 2016
- Date formed: 8 May 2015
- Date dissolved: 13 July 2016

People and organisations
- Monarch: Elizabeth II
- Prime Minister: David Cameron
- Prime Minister's history: Premiership of David Cameron
- First Secretary: George Osborne
- Member party: Conservative Party
- Status in legislature: Majority
- Opposition cabinet: Harman Shadow Cabinet; Corbyn shadow cabinet
- Opposition party: Labour Party
- Opposition leader: Harriet Harman (2015); Jeremy Corbyn (2015–2016)

History
- Outgoing formation: 2016 Conservative leadership election
- Election: 2015 general election
- Legislature terms: 2015–2017
- Budgets: July 2015 budget; 2016 budget
- Predecessor: Cameron–Clegg coalition
- Successor: First May ministry

David Cameron formed the second Cameron ministry, the first Conservative majority government since 1996, following the 2015 general election. Prior to the election Cameron had led his first ministry, the Cameron–Clegg coalition, a coalition government that consisted of members of the Conservatives and the Liberal Democrats, with Liberal Democrat leader Nick Clegg as deputy prime minister.

Following the vote to leave at the EU referendum on the morning of 24 June, Cameron said that he would resign as prime minister after a new Leader of the Conservative Party was chosen after the party conference in the autumn. It was announced on 11 July 2016 that he would resign on 13 July and be succeeded by Home Secretary, Theresa May.

== History ==
Cameron announced his choice for Chancellor of the Exchequer, Home Secretary, Foreign Secretary and Defence Secretary on the afternoon of 8 May 2015, with George Osborne, Theresa May, Philip Hammond and Michael Fallon retaining their posts. Osborne was also given the honorific title of First Secretary of State, which had been held by William Hague in the preceding ministry.

Cameron's choices for other ministers were announced through the week. Eric Pickles, previously the Communities Secretary left the Cabinet and received a knighthood, being replaced by Greg Clark. Michael Gove moved to the position of Justice Secretary, replacing Chris Grayling, who became the new Leader of the House of Commons.

Several vacant Cabinet posts previously held by Liberal Democrats were subsequently filled by Conservative ministers – the positions of Business Secretary, Energy Secretary, Scottish Secretary and Chief Secretary to the Treasury were given to Sajid Javid, Amber Rudd, David Mundell and Greg Hands respectively, with John Whittingdale replacing Javid as Culture Secretary.

Mark Harper replaced Gove as Chief Whip, whilst Matthew Hancock became the new Minister for the Cabinet Office, being replaced by Anna Soubry as Minister of State for Small Business, Industry and Enterprise. Priti Patel became the new Minister of State for Employment and Robert Halfon became a Minister without Portfolio.

The Minister of State for Social Care portfolio was downgraded to a Parliamentary Under-Secretary of State in 2016 under this ministry. It would not regain its former stature until 24 January 2018, under the Second May ministry's 2018 British cabinet reshuffle.

== Cabinet ==
Second Cameron Cabinet
| Portfolio | Portrait | Minister | Term |
|---|---|---|---|
Cabinet ministers
| Prime Minister; First Lord of the Treasury; Minister for the Civil Service | | David Cameron | 2010–16 |
| First Secretary of State; Chancellor of the Exchequer; Second Lord of the Treasury | | George Osborne | 2010–16 |
| Secretary of State for the Home Department | | Theresa May | 2010–16 |
| Secretary of State for Foreign and Commonwealth Affairs | | Philip Hammond | 2014–16 |
| Secretary of State for Justice; Lord High Chancellor of Great Britain | | Michael Gove | 2015–16 |
| Secretary of State for Defence | | Michael Fallon | 2014–16 |
| Secretary of State for Work and Pensions | | Iain Duncan Smith | 2010–16 |
| Secretary of State for Work and Pensions | | Stephen Crabb | 2016 |
| Secretary of State for Health | | Jeremy Hunt | 2012–16 |
| Leader of the House of Commons; Lord President of the Council | | Chris Grayling | 2015–16 |
| Secretary of State for International Development | | Justine Greening | 2012–16 |
| Secretary of State for Education; Minister for Women and Equalities | | Nicky Morgan | 2014–16 |
| Leader of the House of Lords; Lord Keeper of the Privy Seal | | Tina Stowell; Baroness Stowell of Beeston | 2014–16 |
| Secretary of State for Transport | | Patrick McLoughlin | 2012–16 |
| Secretary of State for Business, Innovation and Skills; President of the Board of Trade | | Sajid Javid | 2015–16 |
| Secretary of State for Northern Ireland | | Theresa Villiers | 2012–16 |
| Secretary of State for Environment, Food and Rural Affairs | | Liz Truss | 2014–16 |
| Secretary of State for Communities and Local Government | | Greg Clark | 2015–16 |
| Secretary of State for Wales | | Stephen Crabb | 2014–16 |
| Secretary of State for Wales | | Alun Cairns | 2016 |
| Chancellor of the Duchy of Lancaster | | Oliver Letwin | 2014–16 |
| Secretary of State for Culture, Media and Sport | | John Whittingdale | 2015–16 |
| Secretary of State for Scotland | | David Mundell | 2015–16 |
| Secretary of State for Energy and Climate Change | | Amber Rudd | 2015–16 |
Also attending cabinet meetings
| Minister of State for Foreign and Commonwealth Affairs | | Joyce Anelay; Baroness Anelay of St John's | 2014–16 |
| Minister without Portfolio | | Robert Halfon | 2015–16 |
| Minister for the Cabinet Office; Paymaster General | | Matthew Hancock | 2015–16 |
| Chief Secretary to the Treasury | | Greg Hands | 2015–16 |
| Chief Whip in the House of Commons; Parliamentary Secretary to the Treasury | | Mark Harper | 2015–16 |
| Minister of State for Employment | | Priti Patel | 2015–16 |
| Minister of State for Small Business, Industry and Enterprise | | Anna Soubry | 2015–16 |
| Attorney General | | Jeremy Wright | 2014–16 |

=== Changes ===
- On 19 March 2016, Iain Duncan Smith resigned from his post of Secretary of State for Work and Pensions over plans by Chancellor George Osborne to cut disability benefits. He was replaced by Welsh Secretary Stephen Crabb. Alun Cairns filled the vacancy left by Crabb's promotion. His post was filled by Guto Bebb.

== List of ministers ==
=== Prime Minister and the Cabinet Office ===
| Minister in the House of Commons | Minister in the House of Lords |
Ministers that attend cabinet are listed **in bold**

Prime Minister and Cabinet Office
| Post | Minister | Term |
|---|---|---|
| **Prime Minister**; **First Lord of the Treasury**; **Minister for the Civil Service** | **David Cameron** | May 2015 – July 2016 |
| **Chancellor of the Duchy of Lancaster** | **Oliver Letwin** | May 2015 – July 2016 |
| **Minister for the Cabinet Office**; **Paymaster General** | **Matthew Hancock** | May 2015 – July 2016 |
| **Lord President of the Council** | **Chris Grayling** | May 2015 – July 2016 |
| Parliamentary Under Secretary of State for Civil Society | Rob Wilson | May 2015 – July 2016 |
| Parliamentary Secretary for Constitutional Reform (unpaid) (also Government Whip) | John Penrose | May 2015 – July 2016 |
| Parliamentary Secretary for the Cabinet Office | George Bridges, Baron Bridges of Headley | May 2015 – July 2016 |
| **Minister without Portfolio** (also Chairman of the Conservative Party) | **Robert Halfon** | May 2015 – July 2016 |
| Parliamentary Private Secretary to the Prime Minister | Gavin Williamson | May 2015 – July 2016 |

=== Departments of State ===
Business, Innovation and Skills
| **Secretary of State for Business, Innovation and Skills**; **President of the Board of Trade** | **Sajid Javid** | May 2015 – July 2016 |
| **Minister of State for Small Business, Industry and Enterprise** | **Anna Soubry** | May 2015 – July 2016 |
| Minister of State for Universities and Science | Jo Johnson | May 2015 – July 2016 |
| Minister of State for Trade and Investment (jointly with Foreign Office) | Francis Maude, Baron Maude of Horsham | May 2015 – Mar 2016 |
| Minister of State for Trade and Investment (jointly with Foreign Office) | **Joyce Anelay, Baroness Anelay of St John's** | Mar 2016 – April 2016 (Acting) |
| Minister of State for Trade and Investment (jointly with Foreign Office) | Mark Price, Baron Price | April 2016 – July 2016 |
| Minister of State for Skills (jointly with Education) | Nick Boles | May 2015 – July 2016 |
| Minister of State for Culture and the Digital Economy (jointly with Culture) | Ed Vaizey | May 2015 – July 2016 |
| Parliamentary Under Secretary of State for Life Sciences (jointly with Health) | George Freeman | May 2015 – July 2016 |
| Parliamentary Under Secretary of State for Intellectual Property (jointly with Culture) | Lucy Neville-Rolfe, Baroness Neville-Rolfe | May 2015 – July 2016 |

Communities and Local Government
| **Secretary of State for Communities and Local Government** | **Greg Clark** | May 2015 – July 2016 |
| Minister of State for Communities and Resilience; Minister for Portsmouth | Mark Francois | May 2015 – July 2016 |
| Minister of State for Housing and Planning | Brandon Lewis | May 2015 – July 2016 |
| Parliamentary Under Secretary of State for Local Government | Marcus Jones | May 2015 – July 2016 |
| Parliamentary Under Secretary of State for Local Growth; Minister for the Northern Powerhouse | James Wharton | May 2015 – July 2016 |
| Parliamentary Under Secretary of State for Syrian Refugees (jointly with Home Office & International Development) | Richard Harrington | Sep 2015 – July 2016 |
| Parliamentary Under Secretary of State for Communities and Local Government | Susan Williams, Baroness Williams of Trafford | May 2015 – July 2016 |

Culture, Media and Sport
| **Secretary of State for Culture, Media and Sport** | **John Whittingdale** | May 2015 – July 2016 |
| Minister of State for Culture and the Digital Economy (jointly with Business) | Ed Vaizey | May 2015 – July 2016 |
| Parliamentary Under Secretary of State for Sport and Tourism | Tracey Crouch | May 2015 – Feb 2016 July 2016 |
| Parliamentary Under Secretary of State for Sport and Tourism | David Evennett | Feb 2016 – July 2016 (Acting while Tracey Crouch was on Maternity Leave) |
| Parliamentary Under Secretary of State for Intellectual Property (jointly with Business) | Lucy Neville-Rolfe, Baroness Neville-Rolfe | May 2015 – July 2016 |
| Parliamentary Under Secretary of State for Internet Safety and Security ( jointly with the Home Office since Dec 2015) | Joanna Shields, Baroness Shields | May 2015 – July 2016 |

Defence
| **Secretary of State for Defence** | **Michael Fallon** | May 2015 – July 2016 |
| Minister of State for Defence Procurement | Philip Dunne | May 2015 – July 2016 |
| Minister of State for the Armed Forces | Penny Mordaunt | May 2015 – July 2016 |
| Minister of State for Defence | Frederick Curzon, 7th Earl Howe | May 2015 – July 2016 |
| Parliamentary Under Secretary of State for Defence Personnel, Welfare and Veterans | Mark Lancaster | May 2015 – July 2016 |
| Parliamentary Under Secretary of State for Reserves | Julian Brazier | May 2015 – July 2016 |

Education and Equalities
| **Secretary of State for Education**; **Minister for Women and Equalities** | **Nicky Morgan** | May 2015 – July 2016 |
| Minister of State for Schools | Nick Gibb | May 2015 – July 2016 |
| Minister of State for Skills (jointly with Business) | Nick Boles | May 2015 – July 2016 |
| Minister of State for Children and Families | Edward Timpson | May 2015 – July 2016 |
| Parliamentary Under Secretary of State for Childcare and Education | Sam Gyimah | May 2015 – July 2016 |
| Parliamentary Under Secretary of State for Women and Equalities (jointly with Justice) | Caroline Dinenage | May 2015 – July 2016 |
| Parliamentary Under Secretary of State for Schools (unpaid) | John Nash, Baron Nash | May 2015 – July 2016 |

Energy and Climate Change
| **Secretary of State for Energy and Climate Change** | **Amber Rudd** | May 2015 – July 2016 |
| Minister of State for Energy | Andrea Leadsom | May 2015 – July 2016 |
| Parliamentary Under Secretary of State for Climate Change (jointly with Wales Office) | Nick Bourne, Baron Bourne of Aberystwyth | May 2015 – July 2016 |

Environment, Food and Rural Affairs
| **Secretary of State for Environment, Food and Rural Affairs** | **Liz Truss** | May 2015 – July 2016 |
| Minister of State for Farming, Food and Marine Environment | George Eustice | May 2015 – July 2016 |
| Parliamentary Under Secretary of State for Water, Forestry, Rural Affairs and Resource Management | Rory Stewart | May 2015 – July 2016 |

Foreign and Commonwealth Office
| **Secretary of State for Foreign and Commonwealth Affairs** | **Philip Hammond** | May 2015 – July 2016 |
| Minister of State for Europe and NATO | David Lidington | May 2015 – July 2016 |
| Minister of State for the Commonwealth, the Americas, Asia Pacific and South Asia | Hugo Swire | May 2015 – July 2016 |
| Minister of State for Africa and the Caribbean | Grant Shapps | July 2015 – Oct 2015 (Standing in for James Duddridge due to ill health) |
| **Minister of State for Foreign and Commonwealth Affairs** | **Joyce Anelay, Baroness Anelay of St John's** | May 2015 – July 2016 |
| Minister of State for Trade and Investment (jointly with Business) | Francis Maude, Baron Maude of Horsham | May 2015 – Mar 2016 |
| Minister of State for Trade and Investment (jointly with Business) | **Joyce Anelay, Baroness Anelay of St John's** | Mar 2016 – April 2016 (Acting) |
| Minister of State for Trade and Investment (jointly with Business) | Mark Price, Baron Price | April 2016 – July 2016 |
| Parliamentary Under Secretary of State for the Middle East, North Africa and Central Asia | Tobias Ellwood | May 2015 – July 2016 |
| Parliamentary Under Secretary of State for Africa and the Caribbean | James Duddridge | May 2015 – Jul 2015 Oct 2015 – July 2016 |

Government Equalities Office
| **Minister for Women and Equalities** (Jointly with Education) | **Nicky Morgan** | May 2015 – July 2016 |
| Parliamentary Under Secretary of State for Women and Equalities (Jointly with Education) | Caroline Dinenage | May 2015 – July 2016 |

Health
| **Secretary of State for Health** | **Jeremy Hunt** | May 2015 – July 2016 |
| Minister of State for Community and Social Care | Alistair Burt | May 2015 – July 2016 |
| Parliamentary Under Secretary of State for Care Quality | Ben Gummer | May 2015 – July 2016 |
| Parliamentary Under Secretary of State for Public Health | Jane Ellison | May 2015 – July 2016 |
| Parliamentary Under Secretary of State for Life Sciences (jointly with Business) | George Freeman | May 2015 – July 2016 |
| Parliamentary Under Secretary of State for NHS Productivity | David Prior, Baron Prior of Brampton | May 2015 – July 2016 |

Home Office
| **Secretary of State for the Home Department** | **Theresa May** | May 2015 – July 2016 |
| Minister of State for Policing, Fire, Crime, Criminal Justice, and Victims (jointly with Justice) | Mike Penning | May 2015 – July 2016 |
| Minister of State for Security | John Hayes | May 2015 – July 2016 |
| Minister of State for Immigration | James Brokenshire | May 2015 – July 2016 |
| Minister of State for Home Affairs | Michael Bates, Baron Bates | May 2015 – March 2016 |
| Lord Spokesperson for Home Affairs | Richard Keen, Baron Keen of Elie (jointly with Scottish Office) | April 2016 – July 2016 |
| Parliamentary Under Secretary of State for Preventing Abuse and Exploitation | Karen Bradley | May 2015 – July 2016 |
| Parliamentary Under Secretary of State for Syrian Refugees (jointly with Communities & International Development) | Richard Harrington | Sep 2015 – July 2016 |
| Parliamentary Under Secretary of State for Countering Extremism (jointly with Transport) | Tariq Ahmad, Baron Ahmad of Wimbledon | May 2015 – July 2016 |
| Parliamentary Under Secretary of State for Internet safety & security (jointly with Culture) | Joanna Shields, Baroness Shields | Dec 2015 – July 2016 |

International Development
| **Secretary of State for International Development** | **Justine Greening** | May 2015 – July 2016 |
| Minister of State for International Development | Desmond Swayne | May 2015 – July 2016 |
| Minister of State for International Development | Grant Shapps | May 2015 – Nov 2015 |
| Parliamentary Under Secretary of State for International Development | Nick Hurd | Nov 2015 – July 2016 |
| Parliamentary Under Secretary of State for Syrian Refugees (jointly with Communities & Home Office) | Richard Harrington | Sep 2015 – July 2016 |
| Parliamentary Under Secretary of State for International Development | Sandip Verma, Baroness Verma | May 2015 – July 2016 |

Justice
| **Lord High Chancellor of Great Britain**; **Secretary of State for Justice** | **Michael Gove** | May 2015 – July 2016 |
| Minister of State for Police, Crime, Criminal Justice and Victims (jointly with Home Office) | Mike Penning | May 2015 – July 2016 |
| Minister of State for Civil Justice and Legal Policy (unpaid) | Edward Faulks, Baron Faulks | May 2015 – July 2016 |
| Parliamentary Under Secretary of State for the Courts and Legal Aid | Shailesh Vara | May 2015 – July 2016 |
| Parliamentary Under Secretary of State for Prisons, Probation, Rehabilitation and Sentencing | Andrew Selous | May 2015 – July 2016 |
| Parliamentary Under Secretary of State for Human Rights | Dominic Raab | May 2015 – July 2016 |
| Parliamentary Under Secretary of State for Family Justice (jointly with Education) | Caroline Dinenage | May 2015 – July 2016 |

Northern Ireland
| **Secretary of State for Northern Ireland** | **Theresa Villiers** | May 2015 – July 2016 |
| Minister of State for Northern Ireland | Ben Wallace | May 2015 – July 2016 |

Scotland
| **Secretary of State for Scotland** | **David Mundell** | May 2015 – July 2016 |
| Parliamentary Under Secretary of State for Scotland | Andrew Dunlop, Baron Dunlop | May 2015 – July 2016 |

Transport
| **Secretary of State for Transport** | **Patrick McLoughlin** | May 2015 – July 2016 |
| Minister of State for HS2, Aviation, Maritime and Cycling | Robert Goodwill | Dec 2015 – July 2016 |
| Parliamentary Under Secretary of State for HS2, Aviation, Maritime and Cycling | Robert Goodwill | May 2015 – Dec 2015 |
| Parliamentary Under Secretary of State for Rail | Claire Perry | May 2015 – July 2016 |
| Parliamentary Under Secretary of State for Roads and the Northern Powerhouse | Andrew Jones | May 2015 – July 2016 |
| Parliamentary Under Secretary of State for Security and Regulation (jointly with the Home Office) | Tariq Ahmad, Baron Ahmad of Wimbledon | May 2015 – July 2016 |

Treasury
| **Chancellor of the Exchequer**; **Second Lord of the Treasury**; **First Secretary of State** | **George Osborne** | May 2015 – July 2016 |
| **Chief Secretary to the Treasury** | **Greg Hands** | May 2015 – July 2016 |
| Financial Secretary to the Treasury | David Gauke | May 2015 – July 2016 |
| Exchequer Secretary to the Treasury | Damian Hinds | May 2015 – July 2016 |
| Economic Secretary to the Treasury (City Minister) | Harriett Baldwin | May 2015 – July 2016 |
| Commercial Secretary to the Treasury (unpaid) | Jim O'Neill, Baron O'Neill of Gatley | May 2015 – July 2016 |

Wales
| **Secretary of State for Wales** | **Stephen Crabb** | May 2015 – March 2016 |
| **Secretary of State for Wales** | 'Alun Cairns | March 2016 – July 2016 |
| Parliamentary Under Secretary of State for Wales (unpaid) | Alun Cairns (jointly with Whips Office) | May 2015 – March 2016 |
| Parliamentary Under Secretary of State for Wales (unpaid) | Guto Bebb (jointly with Whips Office) | March 2016 – July 2016 |
| Parliamentary Under Secretary of State for Wales (unpaid) | Nick Bourne, Baron Bourne of Aberystwyth (jointly with Energy) | May 2015 – July 2016 |

Work and Pensions
| **Secretary of State for Work and Pensions** | **Iain Duncan Smith** | May 2015 – March 2016 |
| **Secretary of State for Work and Pensions** | **Stephen Crabb** | March 2016 – July 2016 |
| **Minister of State for Employment** | **Priti Patel** | May 2015 – July 2016 |
| Minister of State for Welfare Reform | David Freud, Baron Freud | May 2015 – July 2016 |
| Minister of State for Pensions and Child Maintenance | Ros Altmann, Baroness Altmann | May 2015 – July 2016 |
| Parliamentary Under-Secretary of State for Disabled People | Justin Tomlinson | May 2015 – July 2016 |
| Parliamentary Under-Secretary of State | Shailesh Vara | July 2015 – July 2016 |

=== Law Officers ===
Attorney General's Office
| **Attorney General**; **Advocate General for Northern Ireland** | **Jeremy Wright** | May 2015 – July 2016 |
| Solicitor General | Robert Buckland | May 2015 – July 2016 |

Office of the Advocate General for Scotland
| Advocate General for Scotland | Richard Keen, Baron Keen of Elie (jointly with Home Office) | May 2015 – July 2016 |

=== Parliament ===
House Leaders
| **Leader of the House of Commons**; **Lord President of the Council** | **Chris Grayling** | May 2015 – July 2016 |
| Deputy Leader of the House of Commons | Thérèse Coffey | May 2015 – July 2016 |
| **Leader of the House of Lords**; **Lord Keeper of the Privy Seal** | **Tina Stowell, Baroness Stowell of Beeston** | May 2015 – July 2016 |
| Deputy Leader of the House of Lords (unpaid) | Frederick Curzon, 7th Earl Howe | May 2015 – July 2016 |

House of Commons Whips
| **Chief Whip of the House of Commons**; **Parliamentary Secretary to the Treasury** | **Mark Harper** | May 2015 – July 2016 |
| Deputy Chief Whip of the House of Commons; Treasurer of HM Household | Anne Milton | May 2015 – July 2016 |
| Government Whip; Comptroller of HM Household | Gavin Barwell | May 2015 – July 2016 |
| Government Whip; Vice Chamberlain of HM Household | Kris Hopkins | May 2015 – July 2016 |
| Whips; Lords Commissioner of HM Treasury | David Evennett | May 2015 – July 2016 |
| Whips; Lords Commissioner of HM Treasury | John Penrose (jointly with Cabinet Office) | May 2015 – July 2016 |
| Whips; Lords Commissioner of HM Treasury | Alun Cairns (jointly with Wales Office) | May 2015 – March 2016 |
| Whips; Lords Commissioner of HM Treasury | Charlie Elphicke | May 2015 – July 2016 |
| Whips; Lords Commissioner of HM Treasury | Mel Stride | May 2015 – July 2016 |
| Whips; Lords Commissioner of HM Treasury | George Hollingbery (unpaid) | May 2015 – July 2016 |
| Whips; Lords Commissioner of HM Treasury | Guto Bebb (jointly with Wales Office) | March 2016 – July 2016 |
| Assistant Government Whips | Guy Opperman | May 2015 – July 2016 |
| Assistant Government Whips | Julian Smith | May 2015 – July 2016 |
| Assistant Government Whips | Margot James (unpaid) | May 2015 – July 2016 |
| Assistant Government Whips | Sarah Newton | May 2015 – July 2016 |
| Assistant Government Whips | Steve Barclay | May 2015 – July 2016 |
| Assistant Government Whips | Simon Kirby | May 2015 – July 2016 |
| Assistant Government Whips | Jackie Doyle-Price | May 2015 – July 2016 |
| Assistant Government Whips | Andrew Selous | May 2015 – July 2016 |

House of Lords Whips
| Captain of the Honourable Corps of Gentlemen-at-Arms; Chief Whip of the House of Lords | John Taylor, Baron Taylor of Holbeach | May 2015 – July 2016 |
| Captain of the Yeomen of the Guard; Deputy Chief Whip of the House of Lords | John Gardiner, Baron Gardiner of Kimble | May 2015 – July 2016 |
| Whips; Lords and Baronesses in Waiting | Henry Ashton, 4th Baron Ashton of Hyde | May 2015 – July 2016 |
| Whips; Lords and Baronesses in Waiting | Nick Bourne, Baron Bourne of Aberystwyth (also with Wales and Energy) | May 2015 – July 2016 |
| Whips; Lords and Baronesses in Waiting | James Younger, 5th Viscount Younger of Leckie | May 2015 – July 2016 |
| Whips; Lords and Baronesses in Waiting | Patrick Stopford, 9th Earl of Courtown | May 2015 – July 2016 |
| Whips; Lords and Baronesses in Waiting | Carlyn Chisholm, Baroness Chisholm of Owlpen (unpaid) | May 2015 – July 2016 |
| Whips; Lords and Baronesses in Waiting | Natalie Evans, Baroness Evans of Bowes Park | May 2015 – July 2016 |

== See also ==
- Premiership of David Cameron

== Notes ==
| Preceded by Cameron–Clegg coalition | Government of the United Kingdom; 2015–2016 | Succeeded by First May ministry |
