= 2021 British cabinet reshuffle =

Overview of the reshuffle of the British cabinet

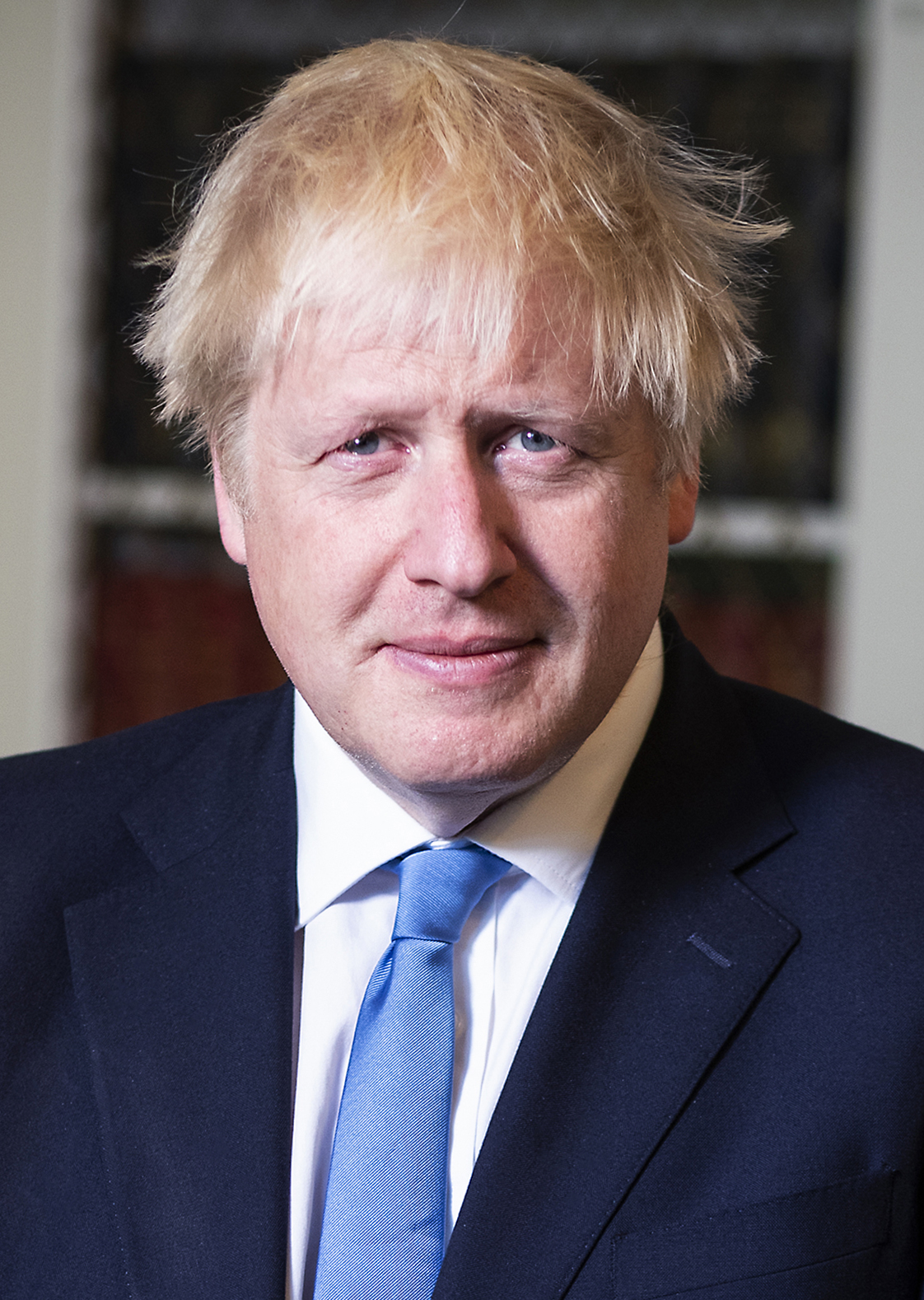
Johnson in 2019

Boris Johnson carried out the second significant reshuffle of his majority government from 15 September to 18 September 2021, having last done so in February 2020.

== Cabinet-level changes ==
Colour key
- Joined the Cabinet
- Left the Cabinet

Minister	Position before reshuffle	Position after reshuffle
Rt Hon Gavin Williamson CBE MP	Secretary of State for Education	Left the government
Nadhim Zahawi MP	Parliamentary Under-Secretary of State for COVID-19 Vaccine Deployment	Secretary of State for Education
Rt Hon Robert Buckland QC MP	Secretary of State for Justice; Lord High Chancellor of Great Britain	Left the government
Rt Hon Dominic Raab MP	First Secretary of State; Secretary of State for Foreign, Commonwealth and Development Affairs	Deputy Prime Minister; Secretary of State for Justice; Lord High Chancellor of Great Britain
Rt Hon Liz Truss MP	Secretary of State for International Trade; Minister for Women and Equalities	Secretary of State for Foreign, Commonwealth and Development Affairs; Minister for Women and Equalities
Rt Hon Anne-Marie Trevelyan MP	Minister of State for Business, Energy and Clean Growth	Secretary of State for International Trade
Rt Hon Robert Jenrick MP	Secretary of State for Housing, Communities and Local Government	Left the government
Rt Hon Michael Gove MP	Chancellor of the Duchy of Lancaster; Minister for the Cabinet Office	Secretary of State for Levelling Up, Housing and Communities; Minister for Intergovernmental Relations
Rt Hon Steve Barclay MP	Chief Secretary to the Treasury	Chancellor of the Duchy of Lancaster; Minister for the Cabinet Office
Simon Clarke MP	Backbencher	Chief Secretary to the Treasury
Rt Hon Amanda Milling MP	Minister without Portfolio; Chairman of the Conservative Party (Note: Non-ministerial position)	Minister of State for Asia
Rt Hon Oliver Dowden CBE MP	Secretary of State for Digital, Culture, Media and Sport	Minister without Portfolio; Chairman of the Conservative Party
Nadine Dorries MP	Minister of State for Mental Health, Suicide Prevention and Patient Safety	Secretary of State for Digital, Culture, Media and Sport
Nigel Adams MP	Minister of State for Asia	Minister of State for the Cabinet Office
Kit Malthouse MP	Minister of State for Crime and Policing	Attending Cabinet
Michelle Donelan MP	Minister of State for Universities	Minister of State for Higher and Further Education; Attending Cabinet

== Junior ministerial changes ==
Colour key
- Promoted (Note: According to the ministerial pay scale: Parliamentary Private Secretary < Parliamentary Under-Secretary of State < Minister of State)
- Left the government

Minister	Position before reshuffle	Position after reshuffle
Rt Hon Greg Hands MP	Minister of State for Trade Policy	Minister of State for Business, Energy and Clean Growth
Rt Hon Penny Mordaunt MP	Paymaster General	Minister of State for Trade Policy
Rt Hon Michael Ellis QC MP	Solicitor General for England and Wales	Paymaster General
Alex Chalk MP	Parliamentary Under-Secretary of State for Justice	Solicitor General for England and Wales
James Cartlidge MP	Backbencher	Parliamentary Under-Secretary of State for Justice
Luke Hall MP	Minister of State for Regional Growth and Local Government	Left the government
Kemi Badenoch MP	Exchequer Secretary to the Treasury; Parliamentary Under-Secretary of State for Equalities	Minister of State for Regional Growth and Local Government; Minister of State for Equalities
Helen Whately MP	Minister of State for Social Care	Exchequer Secretary to the Treasury
Gillian Keegan MP	Parliamentary Under-Secretary of State for Apprenticeships and Skills	Minister of State for Care and Mental Health
Alex Burghart MP	Parliamentary Private Secretary to the Prime Minister	Parliamentary Under-Secretary of State for Apprenticeships and Skills
Andrew Griffith MP	Backbencher	Parliamentary Private Secretary to the Prime Minister
Rt Hon Jesse Norman MP	Financial Secretary to the Treasury	Left the government
Rt Hon Lucy Frazer QC MP	Minister of State for Prisons and Probation	Financial Secretary to the Treasury
Victoria Atkins MP	Parliamentary Under-Secretary of State for Safeguarding	Minister of State for Prisons and Probation
Rachel Maclean MP	Parliamentary Under-Secretary of State for Transport	Parliamentary Under-Secretary of State for Safeguarding
Trudy Harrison MP	Parliamentary Private Secretary to the Prime Minister	Parliamentary Under-Secretary of State for Transport
Sarah Dines MP	Backbench	Parliamentary Private Secretary to the Prime Minister
James Duddridge MP	Parliamentary Under-Secretary of State for Africa	Left the government
Vicky Ford MP	Parliamentary Under-Secretary of State for Children and Families	Parliamentary Under-Secretary of State for Africa
Will Quince MP	Parliamentary Under-Secretary of State for Welfare Delivery	Parliamentary Under-Secretary of State for Children and Families
David Rutley MP	Lord Commissioner of the Treasury	Parliamentary Under-Secretary of State for Welfare Delivery
Rt Hon Nick Gibb MP	Minister of State for School Standards	Left the government
Hon Robin Walker MP	Minister of State for Northern Ireland	Minister of State for School Standards
Rt Hon Conor Burns MP	Backbencher	Minister of State for Northern Ireland
Matt Warman MP	Parliamentary Under-Secretary of State for Digital Infrastructure	Left the government
Chris Philp MP	Parliamentary Under-Secretary of State for Immigration Compliance and Courts	Parliamentary Under-Secretary of State for Digital Economy
Tom Pursglove MP	Assistant Government Whip	Parliamentary Under-Secretary of State for Immigration Compliance and Courts
Rt Hon John Whittingdale OBE MP	Minister of State for Media and Data	Left the government
Julia Lopez MP	Minister for Implementation	Minister of State for Media and Data
Victoria Prentis MP	Parliamentary Under-Secretary of State for Farming, Fisheries and Food	Minister of State for Farming, Fisheries and Food
Jo Churchill MP	Parliamentary Under-Secretary of State for Prevention, Public Health and Primary Care	Parliamentary Under-Secretary of State for Agriculture, Fisheries and Food
Maria Caulfield MP	Assistant Government Whip	Parliamentary Under-Secretary of State for Prevention, Public Health and Primary Care
Graham Stuart MP	Parliamentary Under-Secretary of State for Exports	Left the government
Mike Freer MP	Comptroller of HM Household	Parliamentary Under-Secretary of State for Exports
George Freeman MP	Backbencher	Parliamentary Under-Secretary of State for Science, Research and Innovation
Maggie Throup MP	Lord Commissioner of the Treasury	Parliamentary Under-Secretary of State for COVID-19 Vaccine Deployment
Lee Rowley MP	Deputy Chairman of the Conservative Party; Backbencher	Parliamentary Under-Secretary of State for Business and Industry
Justin Tomlinson MP	Minister of State for Disabled People, Work and Health	Left the government to become Deputy Chairman of the Conservative Party
Chloe Smith MP	Minister of State for the Constitution and Devolution	Minister of State for Disabled People, Work and Health
Neil O'Brien MP	Backbencher	Parliamentary Under-Secretary of State for Levelling Up, The Union and Constitution
Caroline Dinenage MP	Minister of State for Digital and Culture	Left the government
David Duguid MP	Parliamentary Under-Secretary of State for Scotland	Left the government
The Lord Offord of Garvel	None (appointed Peer)	Parliamentary Under-Secretary of State for Scotland
The Baroness Berridge	Parliamentary Under-Secretary of State for Women; Parliamentary Under-Secretary of State for the School System	Left the government
The Baroness Stedman-Scott	Parliamentary Under-Secretary of State for Work and Pensions	Parliamentary Under-Secretary of State for Work and Pensions; Parliamentary Under-Secretary of State for Women
The Baroness Barran	Parliamentary Under-Secretary of State for Civil Society	Parliamentary Under-Secretary of State for the Schools System
The Lord Bethell	Parliamentary Under-Secretary of State for Innovation	Left the government
The Lord Kamall	Backbench Peer	Parliamentary Under-Secretary of State for Innovation

== Whips' Office appointments ==
Whip	Previous position	New position
Marcus Jones MP	Vice-Chamberlain of HM Household	Comptroller of HM Household
James Morris MP	Lord Commissioner of the Treasury	Vice-Chamberlain of HM Household
Amanda Solloway MP	Parliamentary Under-Secretary of State for Science, Research and Innovation	Lord Commissioner of the Treasury
Lee Rowley MP	Deputy Chairman of the Conservative Party; Backbencher	Lord Commissioner of the Treasury
Craig Whittaker MP	Backbencher	Lord Commissioner of the Treasury
Gareth Johnson MP	Parliamentary Private Secretary to the Secretary of State for Foreign, Commonwealth and Development Affairs	Assistant Government Whip
Andrea Jenkyns MP	Parliamentary Private Secretary to the Secretary of State for Housing, Communities and Local Government	Assistant Government Whip
Steve Double MP	Parliamentary Private Secretary to the Secretary of State for Health and Social Care	Assistant Government Whip
James Cartlidge MP	Backbencher	Assistant Government Whip
Heather Wheeler MP	Backbencher	Assistant Government Whip
The Baroness Chisholm of Owlpen	Backbench Peer	Baroness-in-waiting
The Lord Sharpe of Epsom	Backbench Peer	Lord-in-waiting

== Reaction ==
=== Demotion of Dominic Raab ===
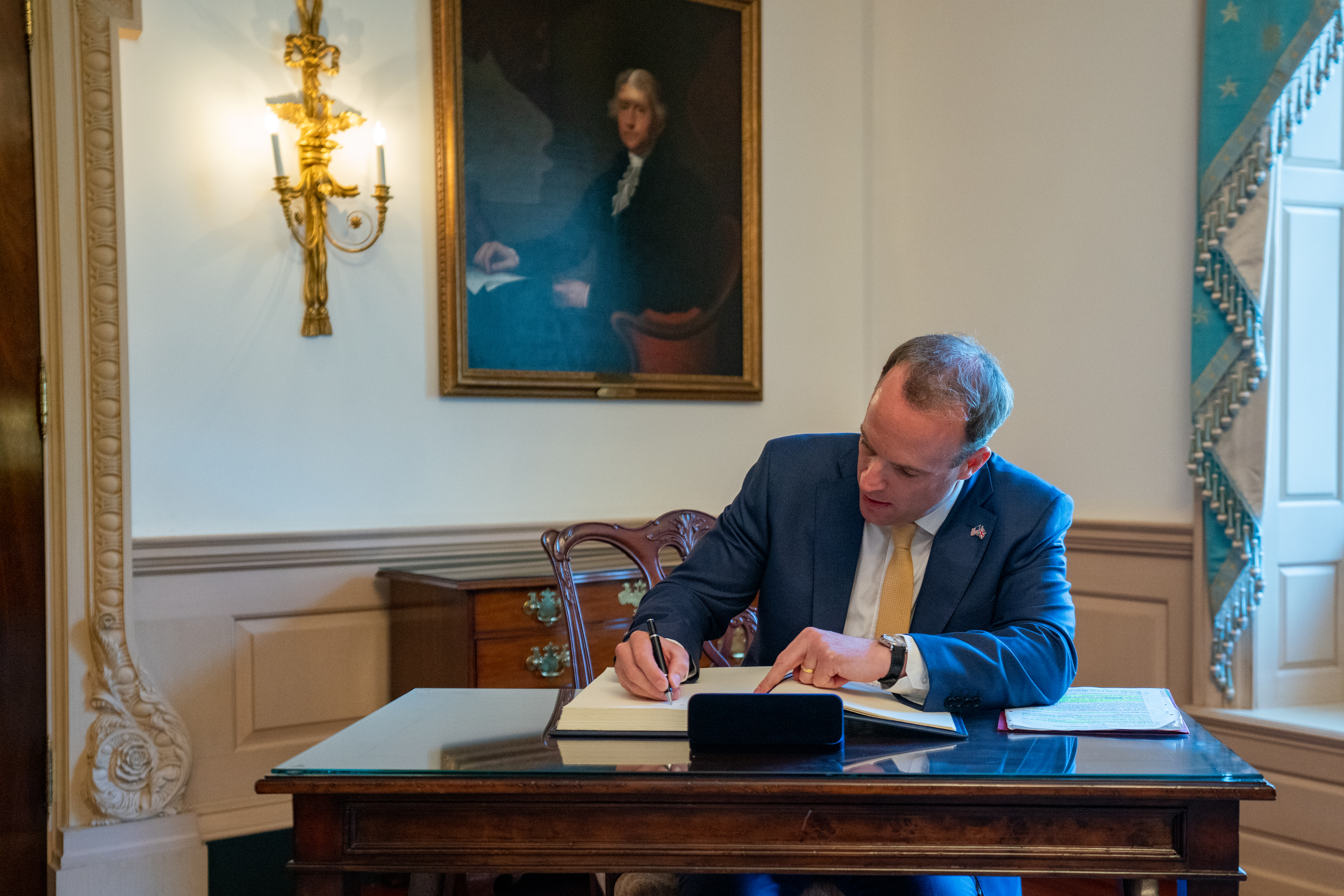
Raab in 2019

There had been growing speculation that Dominic Raab would be demoted from his position as Foreign Secretary, as a result of his handling of the Taliban offensive in August 2021. On the day of the reshuffle, Raab met with the Prime Minister for a considerable length of time, having initially refused to leave the Foreign, Commonwealth and Development Office. The Financial Times reported that Raab was "throwing his toys out of [the] pram". Sources are alleged to have told Sky News that Raab was "very angry" at Johnson's decision to move him. Eventually, Raab accepted his new position as Secretary of State for Justice and was given the additional role of Deputy Prime Minister, making him the first minister to hold the office since Nick Clegg during the Conservative–Liberal Democrat coalition (2010–2015), and it considered a demotion.

=== Appointment of Nadine Dorries ===
The appointment of Nadine Dorries as Culture Secretary was heavily criticised in the arts and culture sectors. Her promotion to the Cabinet was questioned due to her right-wing views and inexperience. Dorries was dubbed by some as the new "Secretary of State for Culture Wars", with concerns raised about her extreme views on cultural issues. Following her appointment, the Broadcasting, Entertainment, Communications and Theatre Union called on the new minister to "focus more on supporting our cultural industries and less on stoking divisive culture wars".

=== Notable dismissals ===
After Robert Buckland was dismissed as Secretary of State for Justice and replaced by Dominic Raab, there was some criticism from Sir Bob Neill, chairman of the Justice Select Committee. Neill told Sky News that removing Buckland from his position was "unjust, outrageous" and that he had been "shabbily treated" by Johnson. Derek Sweeting, chairman of the Bar Council, appeared to criticise the turnover of justice secretaries, stating: "As we welcome the eighth justice secretary in the last 10 years to play this vital role, the need for a consistent and strong voice in government for our justice system could not be greater".

Alix Culbertson wrote that Gavin Williamson's sacking was of "little surprise" following his handling of GCSE grades. He was also criticised for confusing rugby player Maro Itoje with Marcus Rashford. Wes Streeting responded to reports that Williamson had been ‘tipped for knighthood’ saying "there should be no rewards for failure." On 24 September 2021, Williamson unfollowed Boris Johnson on Instagram.

== Later changes ==
In December 2021, Wendy Morton and Chris Heaton-Harris swapped ministerial jobs (Minister of State for Europe and Minister of State for Transport).

== See also ==
- Second Johnson ministry
- Premiership of Boris Johnson
- List of departures from the second Johnson ministry
- 2021 in politics and government
