= Minister of State for Education =

Minister of State for Education may refer to:

- Federal Ministry of Education (Nigeria)
- Minister of State for Education (UK)
