= Secretary of State for Education =

Member of the Cabinet of the United Kingdom

- Royal Arms of His Majesty's Government

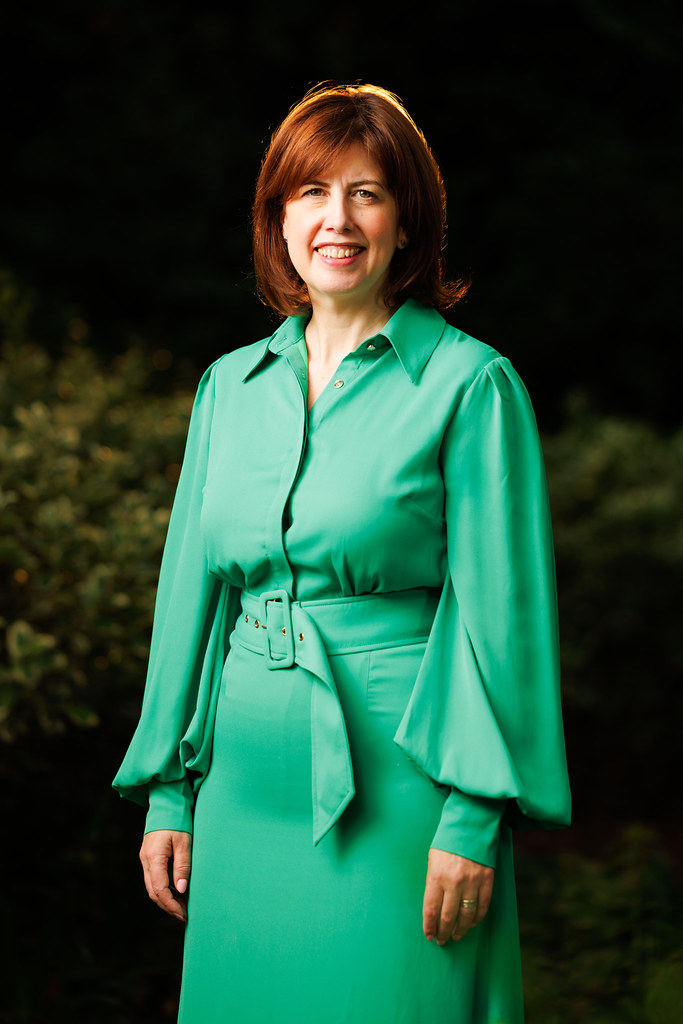
- Incumbent; Lucy Powell since 20 July 2026
- Department for Education (England)
- Style: Education Secretary (informal); The Right Honourable (within the UK and Commonwealth)
- Type: Minister of the Crown
- Status: Secretary of State
- Member of: Cabinet; Privy Council
- Reports to: The Prime Minister
- Seat: Westminster
- Nominator: The Prime Minister
- Appointer: The Monarch; (on the advice of the Prime Minister)
- Term length: At His Majesty's Pleasure
- Formation: 5 February 1857 (as Vice-President of the Committee of the Council on Education); 12 May 2010: (as Secretary of State for Education)
- First holder: William Cowper-Temple (as Vice-President of the Committee of the Council on Education)
- Deputy: Minister of State for School Standards
- Salary: £159,038 per annum (2022) (including £86,584 MP salary)
- Website: gov.uk/government/ministers/secretary-of-state-for-education

- Applies to: England
- Relates to: Education in England

Other UK counterparts
- Northern Ireland: Minister of Education
- Scotland: Cabinet Secretary for Education, Culture and Gaelic
- Wales: Cabinet Minister for Education and the Welsh Language

The secretary of state for education, also referred to as the education secretary, is a secretary of state in the Government of the United Kingdom, responsible for the work of the Department for Education, only overseeing education in England. The incumbent is a member of the Cabinet of the United Kingdom. As education is fully devolved to the Scottish Government, Welsh Government and Northern Ireland Executive, the post holder has no jurisdiction or influence in education policy or direction in Scotland, Wales or Northern Ireland.

The office holder works alongside the other Education ministers. The corresponding shadow minister is the shadow secretary of state for education, and the work of the secretary of state is also scrutinised by the Education Select Committee.

The current education secretary is Lucy Powell.

== Responsibilities ==
Corresponding to what is generally known as an education minister in many other countries, the education secretary's remit is concerned primarily with England. This includes:

- Early years
- Children's social care
- Teacher recruitment and retention
- The national curriculum
- School improvement
- Academies and free schools
- Further education
- Apprenticeships and skills
- Higher education
- Oversight of the departmental coronavirus (COVID-19) response
- Oversight of school infrastructure improvement

== History ==
A committee of the Privy Council was appointed in 1839 to supervise the distribution of certain government grants in the education field. The members of the committee were the Lord President of the Council, the Secretaries of State, the First Lord of the Treasury, and the Chancellor of the Exchequer. From 1857 a vice-president was appointed who took responsibility for policy.

On 1 April 1900, the Board of Education Act 1899 abolished the committee and instituted a new board, headed by a president. The members were initially very similar to the old committee and the president of the board was the Lord President of the council; however, from 1902 this ceased to be the case and the president of the board was appointed separately (although the Marquess of Londonderry happened to hold both jobs from 1903 to 1905).

The Education Act 1944 replaced the Board of Education with a new Ministry of Education.

The position of Secretary of State for Education and Science was created in 1964 with the merger of the offices of Minister of Education and the Minister for Science. The postholder oversaw the Department of Education and Science.

From June 1970 to March 1974, this post was held by future prime minister Margaret Thatcher.

In 1992, the responsibility for science was transferred to the Cabinet Office as the Office of Science and Technology, and the department was renamed Department of Education. In 1995 the department merged with the Department of Employment to become the Department for Education and Employment (DfEE) and in 2001 the employment functions were transferred to a newly created Department for Work and Pensions, with the DfEE becoming the Department for Education and Skills (DfES). In 2007 under Gordon Brown's new premiership, the DfES was split into two new departments; the Department for Children, Schools and Families, and a Department for Innovation, Universities and Skills, under two new secretaries of state.

In 2002 the position was incorporated as a corporation sole.

The ministerial office of the Secretary of State for Innovation, Universities and Skills was, in late 2009, amalgamated into the new ministerial office of Peter Mandelson, as the newly created Secretary of State for Business, Innovation and Skills – itself an amalgamation of the responsibilities of the Secretaries of State for Business, Enterprise and Regulatory Reform and Innovation, Universities and Skills. The Secretary of State has remit over higher education policy as well as British business and enterprise.

From 14 July 2016 to 8 January 2018 the post was held by Justine Greening, as her predecessor, Nicky Morgan, was sacked by Theresa May. Greening resigned after rejecting a reshuffle to the Department for Work and Pensions.

On 7 July 2022, Michelle Donelan became the shortest-serving cabinet member in British history, when she resigned as Education Secretary 35 hours after being appointed.

== List of office holders ==
=== Vice-President of the Committee of the Council on Education (1857–1902) ===
Colour key (for political parties):
Whig Conservative Liberal

Vice-President of the Committee	Term of office		Party	Prime Minister
William Cowper; MP for Hertford	5 February 1857	21 February 1858	Whig	Henry John Temple, 3rd Viscount Palmerston
Charles Adderley; MP for North Staffordshire	12 March 1858	11 June 1859	Conservative	Edward Smith-Stanley, 14th Earl of Derby
Robert Lowe; MP for Calne	24 June 1859	26 April 1864 (resigned)	Liberal	Henry John Temple, 3rd Viscount Palmerston
Henry Bruce; MP for Merthyr Tydfil	26 April 1864	26 June 1866	Liberal	Henry John Temple, 3rd Viscount Palmerston
Henry Bruce; MP for Merthyr Tydfil	26 April 1864	26 June 1866	Liberal	John Russell, 1st Earl Russell
Henry Lowry-Corry; MP for County Tyrone	26 June 1866	19 March 1867	Conservative	Edward Smith-Stanley, 14th Earl of Derby
Lord Robert Montagu; MP for Huntingdonshire	19 March 1867	1 December 1868	Conservative	Edward Smith-Stanley, 14th Earl of Derby
Lord Robert Montagu; MP for Huntingdonshire	19 March 1867	1 December 1868	Conservative	Benjamin Disraeli
William Edward Forster; MP for Bradford	9 December 1868	17 February 1874	Liberal	William Ewart Gladstone
Dudley Ryder, Viscount Sandon; MP for Liverpool	2 March 1874	4 April 1878	Conservative	Benjamin Disraeli
Lord George Hamilton; MP for Middlesex	4 April 1878	21 April 1880	Conservative	Benjamin Disraeli
A. J. Mundella; MP for Sheffield	3 May 1880	9 June 1885	Liberal	William Ewart Gladstone
Edward Stanhope; MP for Mid Lincolnshire	24 June 1885	17 September 1885	Conservative	Robert Gascoyne-Cecil, 3rd Marquess of Salisbury
Sir Henry Holland, Bt. MP for Hampstead	17 September 1885	28 January 1886	Conservative	Robert Gascoyne-Cecil, 3rd Marquess of Salisbury
Lyon Playfair, 1st Baron Playfair; MP for Leeds South	13 February 1886	20 July 1886	Liberal	William Ewart Gladstone
Sir Henry Holland, Bt. MP for Hampstead	3 August 1886	25 January 1887	Conservative	Robert Gascoyne-Cecil, 3rd Marquess of Salisbury
William Hart Dyke; MP for Dartford	25 January 1887	11 August 1892	Conservative	Robert Gascoyne-Cecil, 3rd Marquess of Salisbury
Arthur Dyke Acland; MP for Rotherham	25 August 1892	21 June 1895	Liberal	William Ewart Gladstone
Arthur Dyke Acland; MP for Rotherham	25 August 1892	21 June 1895	Liberal	Archibald Primrose, 5th Earl of Rosebery
John Eldon Gorst; MP for Cambridge University	4 July 1895	8 August 1902	Conservative	Robert Gascoyne-Cecil, 3rd Marquess of Salisbury (Unionist Coalition)

=== President of the Board of Education (1900–1944) ===
Colour key (for political parties):
Liberal Unionist Conservative Liberal Labour National Labour

President of the Board	Term of office		Party	Prime Minister
Spencer Cavendish, 8th Duke of Devonshire; Hereditary peer (also Lord President of the Council)	3 March 1900	8 August 1902	Liberal Unionist	Robert Gascoyne-Cecil, 3rd Marquess of Salisbury (Unionist Coalition)
Charles Vane-Tempest-Stewart, 6th Marquess of Londonderry; Hereditary peer (also Lord President of the Council)	11 August 1902	4 December 1905	Conservative	Arthur Balfour (Unionist Coalition)
Augustine Birrell; MP for Bristol North	10 December 1905	23 January 1907	Liberal	Henry Campbell-Bannerman
Reginald McKenna; MP for North Monmouthshire	23 January 1907	12 April 1908	Liberal	Henry Campbell-Bannerman
Walter Runciman; MP for Dewsbury	12 April 1908	23 October 1911	Liberal	H. H. Asquith
Jack Pease; MP for Rotherham	23 October 1911	25 May 1915	Liberal	H. H. Asquith
Arthur Henderson; MP for Barnard Castle	25 May 1915	18 August 1916	Labour	H. H. Asquith (Coalition)
Robert Crewe-Milnes, 1st Marquess of Crewe; Hereditary peer	18 August 1916	10 December 1916	Liberal	H. H. Asquith (Coalition)
Herbert Fisher; MP for Sheffield Hallam (UK Parliament constituency) (until 1918), Combined English Universities (from 1918)	10 December 1916	19 October 1922	Liberal	David Lloyd George (Coalition)
Edward Wood; MP for Ripon	24 October 1922	22 January 1924	Conservative	Bonar Law
Edward Wood; MP for Ripon	24 October 1922	22 January 1924	Conservative	Stanley Baldwin
Charles Trevelyan; MP for Newcastle upon Tyne Central	22 January 1924	3 November 1924	Labour	Ramsay MacDonald
Eustace Percy, 1st Baron Percy of Newcastle; MP for Hastings	6 November 1924	4 June 1929	Conservative	Stanley Baldwin
Charles Trevelyan; MP for Newcastle upon Tyne Central	7 June 1929	2 March 1931 (resigned)	Labour	Ramsay MacDonald
Hastings Lees-Smith; MP for Keighley	2 March 1931	24 August 1931	Labour	Ramsay MacDonald
Donald Maclean; MP for North Cornwall	25 August 1931	15 June 1932 (died in office)	Liberal	Ramsay MacDonald (1st & 2nd National Min.)
Edward Wood, 1st Baron Irwin (Viscount Halifax from 1934); MP for Ripon	15 June 1932	7 June 1935	Conservative	Ramsay MacDonald (1st & 2nd National Min.)
Oliver Stanley; MP for Westmorland	7 June 1935	28 May 1937	Conservative	Stanley Baldwin (3rd National Min.)
James Stanhope, 7th Earl Stanhope; Hereditary peer	28 May 1937	27 October 1938	Conservative	Neville Chamberlain (4th National Min; War Coalition)
Herbrand Sackville, 9th Earl De La Warr; Hereditary peer	27 October 1938	3 April 1940	National Labour	Neville Chamberlain (4th National Min; War Coalition)
Herwald Ramsbotham; MP for Lancaster	3 April 1940	20 July 1941	Conservative	Winston Churchill (War Coalition)
R. A. Butler; MP for Saffron Walden	20 July 1941	10 August 1944	Conservative	Winston Churchill (War Coalition)

=== Minister of Education (1944–1964) ===
Colour key (for political parties):
Conservative Labour

Minister	Term of office		Party	Prime Minister
R. A. Butler; MP for Saffron Walden	10 August 1944	25 May 1945	Conservative	Winston Churchill (War Coalition)
Richard Law; MP for Kingston upon Hull South West	25 May 1945	26 July 1945	Conservative	Winston Churchill (Caretaker Min.)
Ellen Wilkinson; MP for Jarrow	3 August 1945	6 February 1947 (died in office)	Labour	Clement Attlee
George Tomlinson; MP for Farnworth	10 February 1947	26 October 1951	Labour	Clement Attlee
Florence Horsbrugh; MP for Manchester Moss Side	2 November 1951	18 October 1954	Conservative	Winston Churchill
David Eccles; MP for Chippenham	18 October 1954	13 January 1957	Conservative	Winston Churchill
David Eccles; MP for Chippenham	18 October 1954	13 January 1957	Conservative	Anthony Eden
Quintin Hogg, 2nd Viscount Hailsham; Hereditary peerage	13 January 1957	17 September 1957	Conservative	Harold Macmillan
Geoffrey Lloyd; MP for Sutton Coldfield	17 September 1957	14 October 1959	Conservative	Harold Macmillan
David Eccles; MP for Chippenham	14 October 1959	13 July 1962	Conservative	Harold Macmillan
Edward Boyle, Baron Boyle of Handsworth; MP for Birmingham Handsworth	13 July 1962	1 April 1964	Conservative	Harold Macmillan
Edward Boyle, Baron Boyle of Handsworth; MP for Birmingham Handsworth	13 July 1962	1 April 1964	Conservative	Alec Douglas-Home

=== Secretary of State for Education and Science (1964–1992) ===
Colour key (for political parties):
Conservative Labour

Secretary of State	Term of office		Party	Prime Minister
Quintin Hogg; MP for St Marylebone	1 April 1964	16 October 1964	Conservative	Alec Douglas-Home
Michael Stewart; MP for Fulham	18 October 1964	22 January 1965	Labour	Harold Wilson
Anthony Crosland; MP for Great Grimsby	22 January 1965	29 August 1967	Labour	Harold Wilson
Patrick Gordon Walker; MP for Leyton	29 August 1967	6 April 1968	Labour	Harold Wilson
Edward Short; MP for Newcastle upon Tyne Central	6 April 1968	19 June 1970	Labour	Harold Wilson
Margaret Thatcher; MP for Finchley	20 June 1970	4 March 1974	Conservative	Edward Heath
Reginald Prentice; MP for Newham North East	5 March 1974	9 June 1975	Labour	Harold Wilson
Fred Mulley; MP for Sheffield Park	10 June 1975	9 September 1976	Labour	Harold Wilson
Fred Mulley; MP for Sheffield Park	10 June 1975	9 September 1976	Labour	James Callaghan
Shirley Williams; MP for Hertford and Stevenage	10 September 1976	4 May 1979	Labour	James Callaghan
Mark Carlisle; MP for Runcorn	5 May 1979	14 September 1981	Conservative	Margaret Thatcher
Keith Joseph; MP for Leeds North East	14 September 1981	20 May 1986	Conservative	Margaret Thatcher
Kenneth Baker; MP for Mole Valley	21 May 1986	23 July 1989	Conservative	Margaret Thatcher
John MacGregor; MP for South Norfolk	24 July 1989	1 November 1990	Conservative	Margaret Thatcher
Kenneth Clarke; MP for Rushcliffe	2 November 1990	9 April 1992	Conservative	Margaret Thatcher
Kenneth Clarke; MP for Rushcliffe	2 November 1990	9 April 1992	Conservative	John Major

=== Secretary of State for Education (1992–1995) ===
Colour key (for political parties):
Conservative

Secretary of State	Term of office		Party	Prime Minister
John Patten; MP for Oxford West and Abingdon	10 April 1992	20 July 1994	Conservative	John Major
Gillian Shephard; MP for South West Norfolk	20 July 1994	5 July 1995	Conservative	John Major

=== Secretary of State for Education and Employment (1995–2001) ===
Colour key (for political parties):
Conservative Labour

Secretary of State	Term of office		Party	Prime Minister
Gillian Shephard; MP for South West Norfolk	5 July 1995	1 May 1997	Conservative	John Major
David Blunkett; MP for Sheffield Brightside	1 May 1997	8 June 2001	Labour	Tony Blair

=== Secretary of State for Education and Skills (2001–2007) ===
Responsibility for Employment moved to the newly formed Department for Work and Pensions.

Colour key (for political parties):
Labour

Secretary of State	Term of office		Party	Prime Minister
Estelle Morris; MP for Birmingham Yardley	8 June 2001	24 October 2002 (resigned)	Labour	Tony Blair
Charles Clarke; MP for Norwich South	24 October 2002	15 December 2004	Labour	Tony Blair
Ruth Kelly; MP for Bolton West	15 December 2004	5 May 2006	Labour	Tony Blair
Alan Johnson; MP for Kingston upon Hull West and Hessle	5 May 2006	28 June 2007	Labour	Tony Blair

=== Secretaries of State for Children, Schools and Families (2007–2010); and Innovation, Universities and Skills (2007–2009) ===
In 2007, the education portfolio was divided between the Department for Children, Schools and Families (responsible for infant, primary and secondary education) and the Department for Innovation, Universities and Skills (responsible for further, higher and adult education). In 2009, the latter department was merged into the Department for Business, Innovation and Skills.

==== Secretary of State for Children, Schools and Families ====
Colour key (for political parties):
Labour Co-op

Name	Term of office		Length of term	Political party	Prime Minister
Ed Balls; MP for Normanton	28 June 2007	11 May 2010	2 years, 10 months and 13 days	Labour Co-op	Gordon Brown

==== Secretary of State for Innovation, Universities and Skills ====
The only Secretary of State for Innovation, Universities and Skills was John Denham MP. In a foreword to the department's White Paper, Innovation Nation, published in March 2008, Denham outlined the importance of innovation as a national commitment:

We want innovation to flourish across every area of the economy, and in particular wherever high value added business can flourish and grow. We must innovate in our public services too. Innovation is as important to the delivery of healthcare and education as it is to industries such as manufacturing, retail and the creative economy.

Colour key (for political parties):
Labour

Name	Term of office		Length of term	Political party	Prime Minister
John Denham; MP for Southampton Itchen	28 June 2007	5 June 2009	1 year, 11 months and 8 days	Labour	Gordon Brown

=== Secretary of State for Education (2010–present) ===
The Department for Education and the post of Secretary of State for Education were recreated in 2010.

Responsibility for higher and adult education remained with the Secretary of State for Business, Innovation and Skills (Vince Cable 2010–2015, Sajid Javid 2015–2016), until reunited with the Department for Education in 2016.

Colour key (for political parties):
Conservative

Secretary of State		Term of office		Length of term	Party	Prime Minister
	Michael Gove; MP for Surrey Heath (tenure)	12 May 2010	15 July 2014	4 years, 2 months and 3 days	Conservative	David Cameron (Coalition)
	Nicky Morgan; MP for Loughborough	15 July 2014	13 July 2016	1 year, 11 months and 28 days	Conservative	David Cameron (Coalition)
	Nicky Morgan; MP for Loughborough	15 July 2014	13 July 2016	1 year, 11 months and 28 days	Conservative	David Cameron (II)
	Justine Greening; MP for Putney	14 July 2016	8 January 2018	1 year, 5 months and 25 days	Conservative	Theresa May (I)
	Justine Greening; MP for Putney	14 July 2016	8 January 2018	1 year, 5 months and 25 days	Conservative	Theresa May (II)
	Damian Hinds; MP for East Hampshire	8 January 2018	24 July 2019	1 year, 6 months and 16 days	Conservative	Theresa May (II)
	Gavin Williamson; MP for South Staffordshire	24 July 2019	15 September 2021	2 years, 1 month and 22 days	Conservative	Boris Johnson (I)
	Gavin Williamson; MP for South Staffordshire	24 July 2019	15 September 2021	2 years, 1 month and 22 days	Conservative	Boris Johnson (II)
	Nadhim Zahawi; MP for Stratford-on-Avon	15 September 2021	5 July 2022	9 months and 20 days	Conservative	Boris Johnson (II)
	Michelle Donelan; MP for Chippenham	5 July 2022	7 July 2022	35 hours	Conservative	Boris Johnson (II)
	James Cleverly; MP for Braintree	7 July 2022	6 September 2022	1 month and 30 days	Conservative	Boris Johnson (II)
A white man with brown hair and a blue suit	Kit Malthouse; MP for North West Hampshire	6 September 2022	25 October 2022	1 month and 19 days	Conservative	Liz Truss (Truss ministry)
	Gillian Keegan; MP for Chichester	25 October 2022	5 July 2024	1 year, 8 months and 10 days	Conservative	Rishi Sunak (Sunak ministry)
	Bridget Phillipson; MP for Houghton and Sunderland South	5 July 2024	20 July 2026	2 years and 15 days	Labour	Keir Starmer (Starmer ministry)
	Lucy Powell; MP for Manchester Central	20 July 2026	Incumbent	3 months and 19 days	Labour	Andy Burnham (Burnham ministry)

* Incumbent's length of term last updated: 8 November 2026.

== See also ==
- Category:British secretaries of state for education
