= Parliamentary Under-Secretary of State for Children, Families and Wellbeing =

Minister of the British Government for children

United Kingdom Parliamentary Under-Secretary of State for Children and Families
- Royal Arms of His Majesty's Government

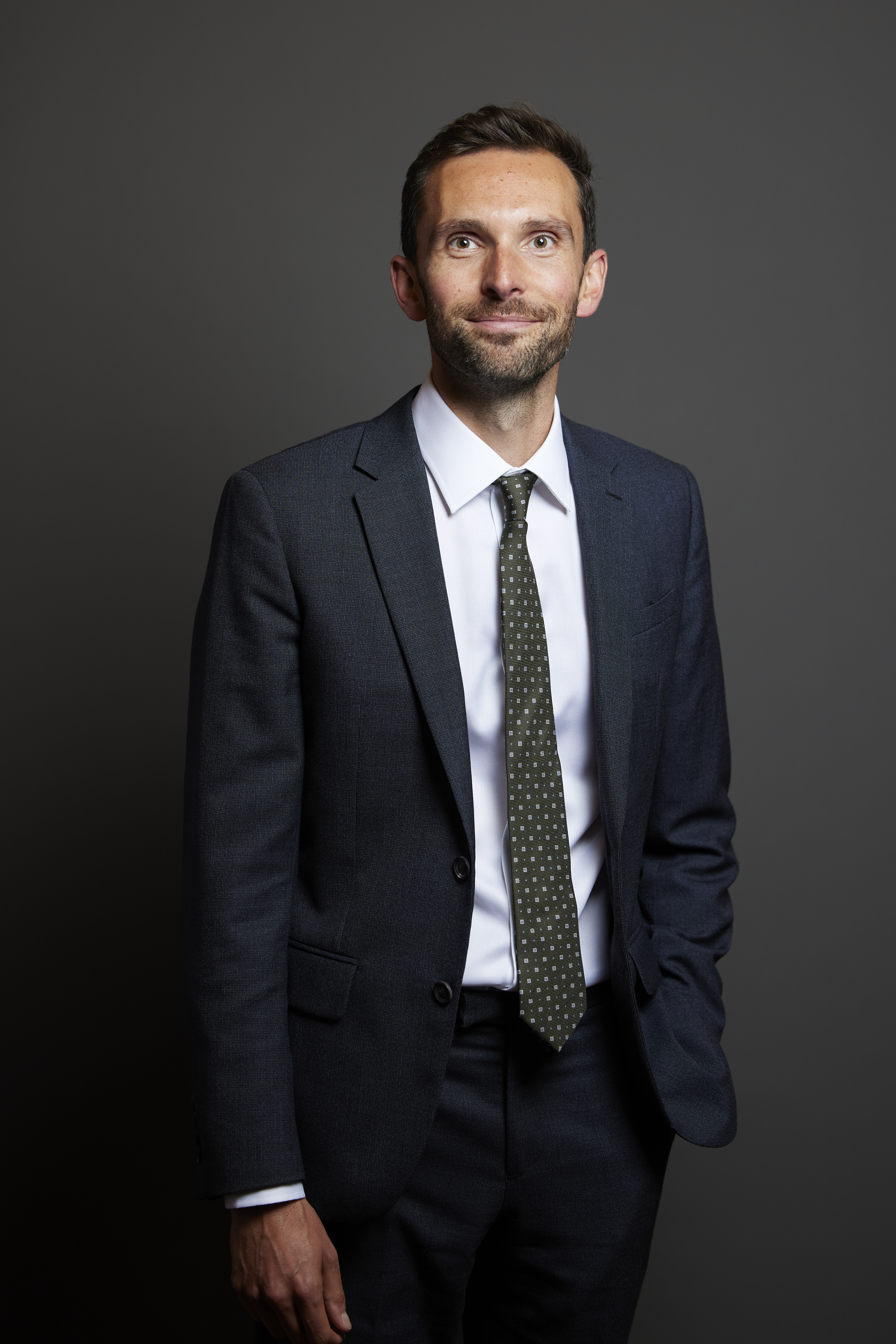
- Incumbent; Josh MacAlister since 7 September 2025
- Department for Education
- Style: Minister
- Nominator: Prime Minister of the United Kingdom
- Appointer: The Monarch; on advice of the Prime Minister
- Term length: At His Majesty's pleasure
- Website: Parliamentary Under-Secretary of State (Minister for Children and Families)

The office of Parliamentary Under-Secretary of State for Children and Families, formerly Parliamentary Under-Secretary of State for Children, Families and Wellbeing, is a junior ministerial position in the Department for Education, previously the Department for Children, Schools and Families and Department for Education and Skills, in the Government of the United Kingdom. The incumbent minister is Josh MacAlister.

The post was previously known as Minister of State for Schools and Childhood following the appointment of Kelly Tolhurst on 7 September 2022, who succeeded Brendan Clarke-Smith.

== History ==
Margaret Hodge was the first person to hold the position after it was announced in 2003. Maria Eagle was the minister from 2005 to 2006 taking Hodge's place, and Beverley Hughes held the position from 2006 until June 2009, when Dawn Primarolo took over until Labour lost office in May 2010.

== List of ministers ==
Prior to the formal creation of a dedicated Minister for Children in 2003, responsibility for children's social services, care, and child protection was held by ministers at the Department of Health. The table below includes notable historical officeholders who held the children's portfolio prior to its transfer to the Department for Education.

Colour key (for political parties):
Labour Conservative Liberal Democrats

Name	Portrait	Term of office		Political party	P.M.	Secretary of State
Ministers with responsibility for children (Department of Health)
Virginia Bottomley		28 October 1989	11 April 1992	Conservative	Thatcher; Major	Clarke; Waldegrave
John Bowis		16 September 1993	23 July 1996	Conservative	Major	Bottomley; Dorrell
John Hutton		27 October 1998	13 June 2003	Labour	Blair	Dobson; Milburn
Minister of State for Children
Margaret Hodge		13 June 2003	9 May 2005	Labour	Blair	Clarke
Margaret Hodge		13 June 2003	9 May 2005	Labour	Blair	Kelly
Parliamentary Under-Secretary of State for Children and Families
Maria Eagle		9 May 2005	5 May 2006	Labour	Blair	Kelly
Minister of State for Children, Young People and Families
Beverley Hughes		5 May 2006	28 June 2007	Labour	Blair	Johnson
Minister of State for Children and Youth Justice
Beverley Hughes		28 June 2007	5 June 2009	Labour	Brown	Balls (CSF Sec.)
Minister of State for Children, Schools and Families
Dawn Primarolo		5 June 2009	11 May 2010	Labour	Brown	Balls (CSF Sec.)
Sarah Teather		13 May 2010	4 September 2012	Liberal Democrat	Cameron	Gove
Parliamentary Under-Secretary of State for Children and Families
Tim Loughton		13 May 2010	4 September 2012	Conservative	Cameron	Gove
Edward Timpson		4 September 2012	8 May 2015	Conservative	Cameron	Gove
Edward Timpson		4 September 2012	8 May 2015	Conservative	Cameron	Morgan
Minister of State for Vulnerable Children and Families
Edward Timpson		8 May 2015	12 June 2017	Conservative	Cameron	Morgan
Edward Timpson		8 May 2015	12 June 2017	Conservative	May	Greening
Robert Goodwill		12 June 2017	9 January 2018	Conservative	May	Greening
Parliamentary Under-Secretary of State for Children and Families
Nadhim Zahawi		9 January 2018	25 July 2019	Conservative	May	Hinds
Kemi Badenoch (Note: Michelle Donelan appointed on 4 September 2019 to cover the portfolio during Badenoch's maternity leave.)		27 July 2019	13 February 2020	Conservative	Johnson	Williamson
Michelle Donelan (Note: Donelan was appointed to cover the portfolio during the maternity leave of Badenoch.)		4 September 2019	13 February 2020	Conservative	Johnson	Williamson
Vicky Ford		14 February 2020	16 September 2021	Conservative	Johnson	Williamson
Will Quince		16 September 2021	6 July 2022	Conservative	Johnson	Zahawi
Will Quince		16 September 2021	6 July 2022	Conservative	Johnson	Donelan
Brendan Clarke-Smith		8 July 2022	7 September 2022	Conservative	Johnson	Cleverly
Minister of State for Schools and Childhood
Kelly Tolhurst		7 September 2022	28 October 2022	Conservative	Truss	Malthouse
Kelly Tolhurst		7 September 2022	28 October 2022	Conservative	Sunak	Keegan
Parliamentary Under-Secretary of State for Children, Families and Wellbeing
Claire Coutinho		28 October 2022	31 August 2023	Conservative	Sunak	Keegan
David Johnston		31 August 2023	5 July 2024	Conservative	Sunak	Keegan
Parliamentary Under-Secretary of State for Children and Families
Janet Daby		6 July 2024	7 September 2025	Labour	Starmer	Phillipson
Josh MacAlister		7 September 2025	Incumbent	Labour	Starmer	Phillipson
Josh MacAlister		7 September 2025	Incumbent	Labour	Burnham	Powell
