= Cameron ministry =

Cameron ministry may refer to:

- First Cameron ministry, the British coalition government led by David Cameron from 2010 to 2015
- Second Cameron ministry, the British majority government led by David Cameron from 2015 to 2016

== See also ==
- Shadow Cabinet of David Cameron
- Premiership of David Cameron
