= Parliamentary Under-Secretary of State for Small Business and Enterprise =

Junior ministerial office of the Government of the United Kingdom

- Royal Arms of His Majesty's Government

- Incumbent; Sonny Leong, Baron Leong since 22 July 2026
- Department for Business, Innovation, Science and Trade
- Style: Minister
- Nominator: Prime Minister of the United Kingdom
- Appointer: The Monarch; on advice of the Prime Minister
- Formation: July 2016
- First holder: Mark Garnier
- Website: https://www.gov.uk/government/ministers/parliamentary-under-secretary-of-state-minister-for-exports

The Parliamentary Under-Secretary of State for Small Business and Enterprise, previously the Parliamentary Under-Secretary of State for Exports, is a junior position in the Department for Business, Innovation, Science and Trade of the Government of the United Kingdom.

== Responsibilities ==
The minister has responsibility of the following policy areas:

- Export policy and promotion, including the export strategy
- UK Export Finance (UKEF)
- UK Defence and Security Exports
- climate change and COP26
- GREAT campaign
- trade missions
- global events
- investment policy in the House of Commons

== Officeholders ==
Colour key (for political parties):
Conservative

Name	Portrait	Term of office		Political party	P.M.	President of the Board of Trade
Parliamentary Under-Secretary of State for Exports
Mark Garnier		15 July 2016	9 January 2018	Conservative	Theresa May	Liam Fox
Graham Stuart		9 January 2018	16 September 2021	Conservative	Theresa May	Liam Fox
Graham Stuart		9 January 2018	16 September 2021	Conservative	Boris Johnson	Liz Truss
Mike Freer		16 September 2021	6 July 2022	Conservative	Boris Johnson	Anne-Marie Trevelyan
Andrew Griffith		8 July 2022	7 September 2022	Conservative	Boris Johnson	Anne-Marie Trevelyan
Marcus Fysh		20 September 2022	27 October 2022	Conservative	Liz Truss	Kemi Badenoch
Andrew Bowie		28 October 2022	7 February 2023	Conservative	Rishi Sunak	Kemi Badenoch
Malcolm Offord, Baron Offord of Garvel		24 April 2023	5 July 2024	Conservative	Rishi Sunak	Kemi Badenoch
Parliamentary Under-Secretary of State for Services, Small Business and Exports
Gareth Thomas		9 July 2024	7 September 2025	Labour Co-op	Keir Starmer	Jonathan Reynolds
Parliamentary Under-Secretary of State for Small Business and Economic Transformation
Blair McDougall		7 September 2025	21 July 2026	Labour	Keir Starmer	Peter Kyle
Parliamentary Under-Secretary of State for Small Business and Enterprise
Sonny Leong, Baron Leong		22 July 2026	incumbent	Labour	Andy Burnham	Jonathan Reynolds
