= David Rutley =

British politician

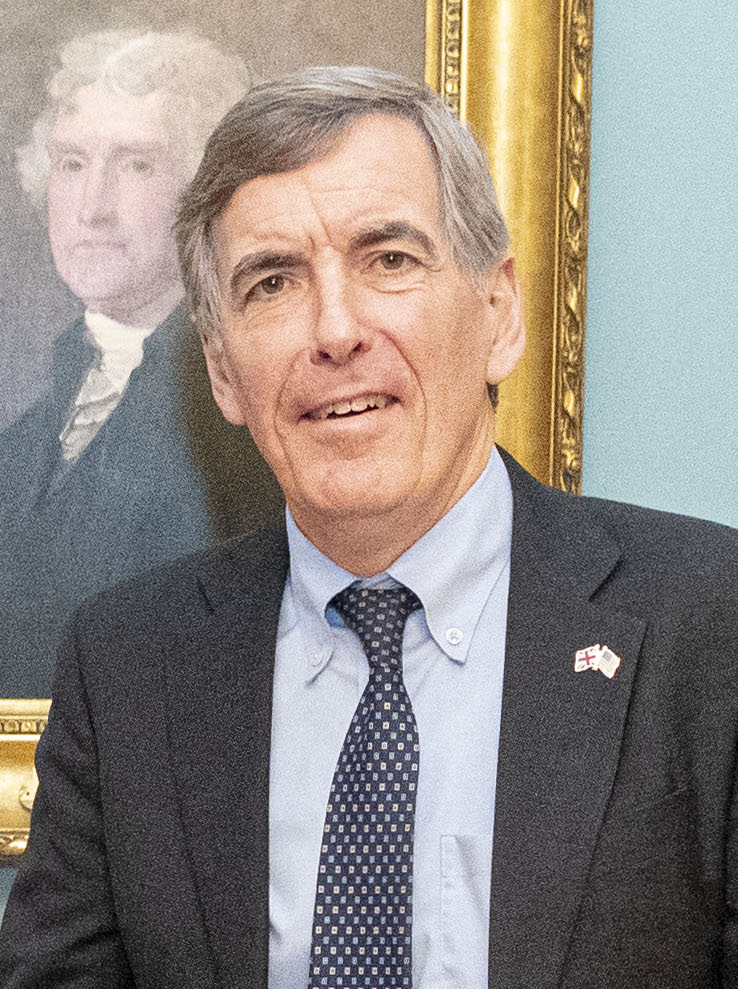
- David Rutley in 2024

Parliamentary Under-Secretary of State for Americas, Caribbean and Overseas Territories (Note: Parliamentary Under-Secretary of State for Americas and Caribbean until November 2023)
- In office 27 October 2022 – 5 July 2024
- Prime Minister: Rishi Sunak
- Preceded by: Jesse Norman
- Succeeded by: Stephen Doughty (North America and Overseas Territories); The Baroness Chapman of Darlington (Latin America and Caribbean)

Parliamentary Under-Secretary of State for Welfare Delivery
- In office 17 September 2021 – 20 September 2022
- Prime Minister: Boris Johnson; Liz Truss
- Preceded by: Will Quince
- Succeeded by: Office abolished

Lord Commissioner of the Treasury
- In office 15 June 2017 – 17 September 2021
- Prime Minister: Theresa May; Boris Johnson
- Preceded by: Steve Barclay
- Succeeded by: Lee Rowley

Parliamentary Under-Secretary of State for Food and Animal Welfare
- In office 3 September 2018 – 27 July 2019
- Prime Minister: Theresa May
- Preceded by: Position established
- Succeeded by: Lord Goldsmith of Richmond Park

Member of Parliament for Macclesfield
- In office 6 May 2010 – 30 May 2024
- Preceded by: Nicholas Winterton
- Succeeded by: Tim Roca

Personal details
- Born: David Henry Rutley; 7 March 1961 (age 65) Gravesend, Kent, England
- Party: Conservative
- Children: 4
- Education: London School of Economics; Harvard University
- Occupation: Businessman
- Website: davidrutley.org.uk

David Henry Rutley (born 7 March 1961) is a British former politician who served as the Member of Parliament (MP) for Macclesfield from 2010 until 2024. A member of the Conservative Party, he was Parliamentary Under-Secretary of State for Americas and Caribbean from October 2022 until July 2024.

== Early life and career ==
David Rutley was born in Gravesham, Kent, in March 1961. He was educated at the comprehensive Priory School, Lewes, before going on to study at the London School of Economics (LSE) and Harvard Business School.

He spent most of his career in business and worked as a senior executive in major companies including Asda (where he ran home shopping and e-commerce), PepsiCo International, Halifax, and Barclays.

A one time advisor to cabinet minister William Waldegrave in the early 1990s, Rutley worked as a special adviser from 1994 to 1996 in John Major's Conservative government at the Treasury, Cabinet Office and Ministry of Agriculture, Fisheries and Food. During this time, Rutley helped shape the Budget and initiate the first ever White Paper for rural England.

== Political career ==
Rutley stood as the Conservative candidate for St Albans at the 1997 general election, coming second with 33.2% of the vote behind the Labour candidate Kerry Pollard.

At the 2010 general election, Rutley was elected to Parliament as MP for Macclesfield with 47% of the vote and a majority of 11,959.

In July 2010, Rutley was elected to the Treasury Select Committee and served on the committee until his appointment in November 2010 as Parliamentary Private Secretary to Damian Green, Minister of State for Immigration. When Green left office in the 2014 reshuffle, Rutley became PPS to David Lidington at the Foreign Office.

At the 2015 general election, Rutley was re-elected as MP for Macclesfield with an increased vote share of 52.5% and an increased majority of 14,811.

Rutley was opposed to Brexit prior to the 2016 EU membership referendum.

Rutley was again re-elected at the snap 2017 general election, with an increased vote share of 52.7% and a decreased majority of 8,608.

In June 2017, Rutley was appointed a Lord Commissioner of the Treasury, making him a government whip. From September 2018 to June 2019, Rutley was appointed Parliamentary Under-Secretary of State at the Department for Environment, Food and Rural Affairs, in addition to his role as a whip. This followed an interim appointment as Parliamentary Under-Secretary in the same department from 22 May 2018, during Thérèse Coffey's recovery from illness.

At the 2019 general election, Rutley was again re-elected, with a decreased vote share of 52.7% and an increased majority of 10,711.

He has served as the Co-Chairman of the All Party Parliamentary Group (APPG) on Mountaineering, the Chairman of the British-Danish APPG, secretary of both the APPG national parks and the APPG for Mountain Rescue, and an officer for the APPG on management. He has also been a member of other APPGs, including those on: China, Pharmaceuticals and Financial Education for Young People.

On 17 September 2021, Rutley was appointed Parliamentary Under-Secretary of State at the Department for Work and Pensions during the second cabinet reshuffle of the second Johnson ministry. In October 2022, he was appointed Parliamentary Under-Secretary of State for Americas and Caribbean.

Rutley went on to lose his seat in 2024, losing to Tim Roca of the Labour Party with an 18.6% swing seeing him fall to second place with 15,552 votes to Roca's 24,672.

== Personal life ==
Rutley is married to his wife, Rachel, a physiotherapist, with whom he has four children. He is a member of the Church of Jesus Christ of Latter-day Saints, and served as an LDS Church missionary in the North of England from 1979 to 1981.

Outside politics, he is a keen mountaineer and has climbed in mountain ranges throughout the world. He also enjoys fishing, and bird watching. Although not a player, he is the honorary vice-president of the Ash Tree Cricket Club in Prestbury, which is in his former constituency.

Parliament of the United Kingdom
| Preceded by Sir Nicholas Winterton | Member of Parliament for Macclesfield; 2010–2024 | Succeeded by Tim Roca |
