= Minister of State for Schools =

UK minister of state

United Kingdom Minister of State for School Standards
- Royal Arms of His Majesty's Government

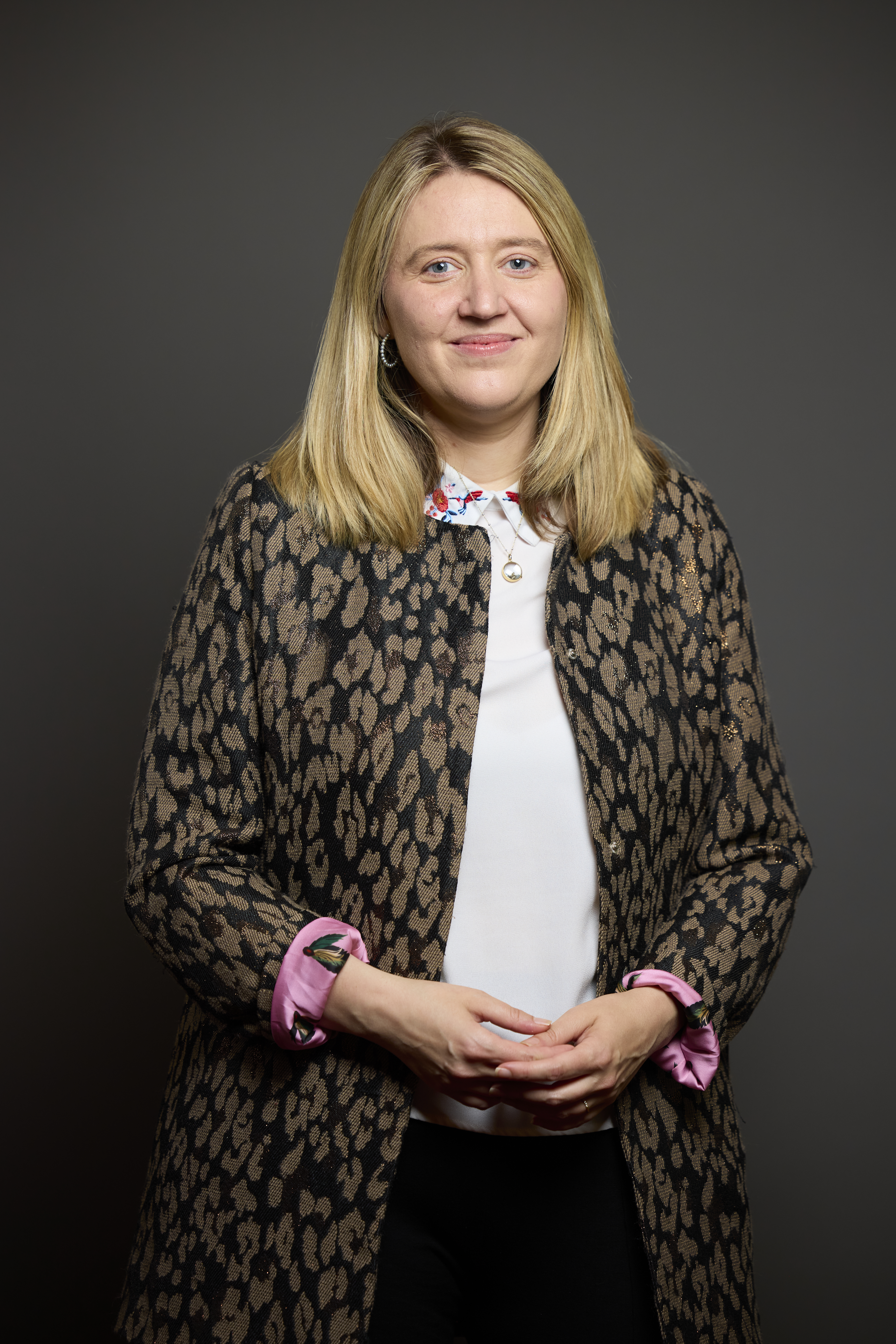
- Incumbent; Georgia Gould since 6 September 2025
- Department for Education
- Style: Minister
- Nominator: Prime Minister of the United Kingdom
- Appointer: The Monarch; on advice of the Prime Minister
- Term length: At His Majesty's pleasure
- Website: https://www.gov.uk/government/ministers/minister-of-state-for-schools

The role of Minister of State for School Standards, formerly Minister of State for Schools is a mid-level position in the Department for Education in the British government.

The current minister is Georgia Gould

== History ==
In the Major ministries, the role was known as Minister of State for Education and Science and Minister of State for Education.

In the Brown ministry (2007 to 2010), the position of Minister of State for Schools and Learning worked at the Department for Children, Schools and Families.

In the Cameron ministries, the role was known as Minister of State for Schools.

Under Liz Truss's tenure, the role was demoted to a parliamentary under-secretary position known as Parliamentary Under-Secretary of State for School Standards.

== Responsibilities ==
The minister is responsible for the following:

- recruitment and retention of teachers and school leaders (including initial teacher training, qualifications and professional development)
- supporting a high-quality teaching profession and reducing teacher workload
- Teaching Regulation Agency
- admissions and school transport
- school revenue funding, including the national funding formula for schools
- curriculum and qualifications (including links with Ofqual)
- Standards and Testing Agency and primary assessment
- school accountability and inspection (including links with Ofsted)
- support for raising school standards
- school sport
- pupil premium
- relationships, sex, and health education; and personal, social, health and economic education
- behaviour and attendance and exclusions
- early education curriculum and teaching quality
- coronavirus (COVID-19) response for schools

== List of ministers ==
Name	Portrait	Took office	Left office	Political party	Prime Minister
Minister of State for Education
Edward Boyle MP for Birmingham Handsworth		1 April 1964	16 October 1964	Conservative	Douglas-Home
Peter Legh, 4th Baron Newton		1 April 1964	16 October 1964	Conservative	Douglas-Home
Minister of State, Education and Science
Bertram Bowden, Baron Bowden		19 October 1964	11 October 1965	Labour	Wilson I
Reg Prentice MP for East Ham North		20 October 1964	6 April 1966	Labour	Wilson I
Edward Redhead MP for Walthamstow West		11 October 1965	7 January 1967	Labour	Wilson I
Goronwy Roberts MP for Caernarfon		6 April 1966	29 August 1967	Labour	Wilson II
Shirley Williams MP for Hitchin		7 January 1967	13 October 1969	Labour	Wilson II
Alice Bacon MP for Leeds South East		29 August 1967	19 June 1970	Labour	Wilson II
Gerald Fowler MP for The Wrekin		13 October 1969	19 June 1970	Labour	Wilson II
Parliamentary Under-Secretary of State, Education and Science
John Ganzoni, 2nd Baron Belstead		24 June 1970	5 June 1973	Conservative	Heath
Minister of State, Education and Science
Norman St John-Stevas MP for Chelmsford		5 June 1973	4 March 1974	Conservative	Heath
Gerald Fowler MP for The Wrekin		8 March 1974	18 October 1974	Labour	Wilson III
Norman Crowther Hunt, Baron Crowther-Hunt		18 October 1974	23 January 1976	Labour	Wilson IV
Gerald Fowler MP for The Wrekin		23 January 1976	10 September 1976	Labour	Callaghan
Gordon Oakes MP for Widnes		10 September 1976	4 May 1979	Labour	Callaghan
Janet Young, Baroness Young		7 May 1979	14 September 1981	Conservative	Thatcher I
Paul Channon MP for Southend West		5 January 1981	13 June 1983	Conservative	Thatcher I
Parliamentary Under-Secretary of State, Education and Science
Peter Brooke MP for City of London and Westminster South		13 June 1983	19 November 1985	Conservative	Thatcher II)
Minister of State, Education and Science
Chris Patten MP for Bath		5 September 1985	10 September 1986	Conservative	Thatcher II
Angela Rumbold MP for Mitcham and Morden		10 September 1986	24 July 1990	Conservative	Thatcher III
Tim Eggar MP for Enfield North		24 July 1990	14 April 1992	Conservative	Major I
Emily Blatch, Baroness Blatch		14 April 1992	20 July 1994	Conservative	Major II
Eric Forth MP for Mid Worcestershire		20 July 1994	2 May 1997	Conservative	Major II
Stephen Byers MP for North Tyneside		2 May 1997	27 July 1998	Labour	Blair I
Estelle Morris MP for Birmingham Yardley		28 July 1998	8 June 2001	Labour	Blair I
Stephen Timms MP for East Ham		11 June 2001	24 October 2002	Labour	Blair III
David Miliband MP for South Shields		24 October 2002	16 December 2004	Labour	Blair III
Stephen Twigg MP for Enfield Southgate		16 December 2004	5 May 2005	Labour Co-op	Blair III
Jacqui Smith MP for Redditch		6 May 2005	5 May 2006	Labour	Blair III
Jim Knight MP for South Dorset		5 May 2006	5 June 2009	Labour Co-op	Blair III Brown
Vernon Coaker MP for Gedling		8 June 2009	11 May 2010	Labour	Brown
Minister of State for Schools
Nick Gibb MP for Bognor Regis and Littlehampton		13 May 2010	4 September 2012	Conservative	Cameron–Clegg
David Laws MP for Yeovil		4 September 2012	8 May 2015	Liberal Democrat	Cameron–Clegg
Minister of State for School Reform
Nick Gibb MP for Bognor Regis and Littlehampton		15 July 2014	12 May 2015	Conservative	Cameron–Clegg
Minister of State for School Standards
Nick Gibb MP for Bognor Regis and Littlehampton		12 May 2015	15 September 2021	Conservative	Cameron II; May I & II; Johnson I & II
Robin Walker MP for Worcester		16 September 2021	6 July 2022	Conservative	Johnson II
Will Quince MP for Colchester		7 July 2022	7 September 2022	Conservative	Johnson II
Parliamentary Under-Secretary of State for School Standards
Jonathan Gullis MP for Stoke-on-Trent North		8 September 2022	28 October 2022	Conservative	Truss
Minister of State for Schools
Nick Gibb MP for Bognor Regis and Littlehampton		26 October 2022	13 November 2023	Conservative	Sunak
Damian Hinds MP for East Hampshire		13 November 2023	5 July 2024	Conservative	Sunak
Minister of State for School Standards
Catherine McKinnell MP for Newcastle upon Tyne North		8 July 2024	6 September 2025	Labour	Starmer
Georgia Gould MP for Queen's Park and Maida Vale		6 September 2025	Incumbent	Labour	Starmer
Georgia Gould MP for Queen's Park and Maida Vale		6 September 2025	Incumbent	Labour	Burnham
