= Will Quince =

British politician (born 1982)

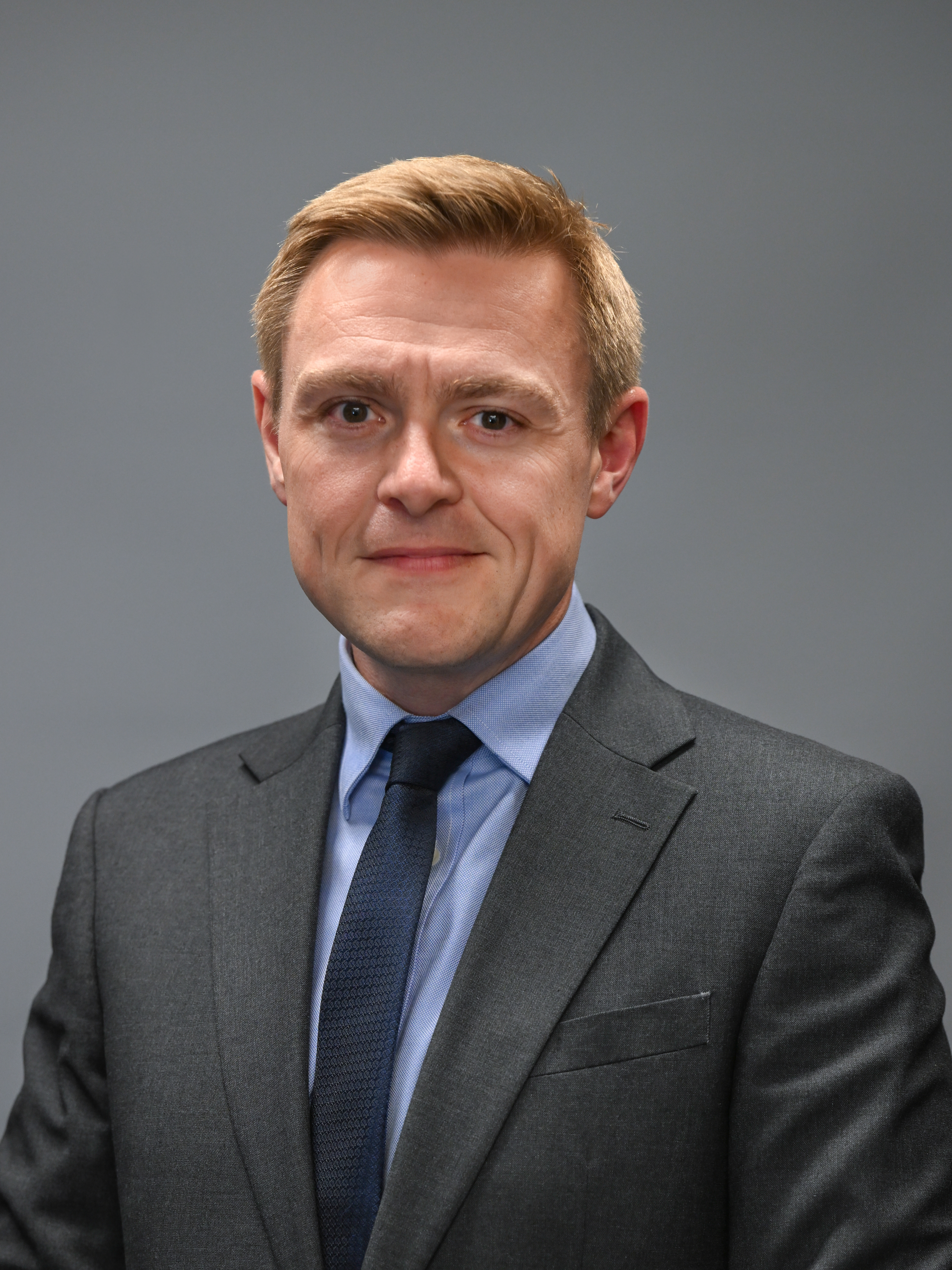
- Official portrait, 2023

Minister of State for Health and Secondary Care (Note: Minister of State for Health from 8 September 2022 to 26 October 2022.)
- In office 8 September 2022 – 13 November 2023
- Prime Minister: Liz Truss; Rishi Sunak
- Preceded by: Maria Caulfield
- Succeeded by: Andrew Stephenson

Minister of State for School Standards
- In office 7 July 2022 – 8 September 2022
- Prime Minister: Boris Johnson
- Preceded by: Robin Walker
- Succeeded by: Jonathan Gullis

Parliamentary Under-Secretary of State for Children and Families
- In office 17 September 2021 – 6 July 2022
- Prime Minister: Boris Johnson
- Preceded by: Vicky Ford
- Succeeded by: Brendan Clarke-Smith

Parliamentary Under-Secretary of State for Welfare Delivery
- In office 4 April 2019 – 17 September 2021
- Prime Minister: Theresa May; Boris Johnson
- Preceded by: Justin Tomlinson
- Succeeded by: David Rutley

Member of Parliament for Colchester
- In office 7 May 2015 – 30 May 2024
- Preceded by: Sir Bob Russell
- Succeeded by: Pam Cox

Personal details
- Born: 27 December 1982 (age 43) Buckinghamshire, England
- Party: Conservative
- Education: The Windsor Boys' School, Berkshire; Aberystwyth University

Military service
- Allegiance: United Kingdom
- Branch/service: British Army (Reserve)
- Years of service: 2022–present
- Unit: Military Provost Staff

William James Quince (born 27 December 1982) is a British Conservative Party politician and former lawyer who served as Member of Parliament (MP) for Colchester from 2015 to 2024. Quince was also Minister of State for Health and Secondary Care from September 2022 to November 2023.

== Early life and education ==
Quince was born on 27 December 1982 in Buckinghamshire. He grew up in Berkshire and attended The Windsor Boys' School, a state comprehensive school in Windsor. He studied Law between 2001 and 2005 at Aberystwyth University.

== Career ==
After graduating, Quince worked for Concur Technologies Ltd as a market development executive and Britvic plc as a customer development executive. Based in Ware in Hertfordshire, he was elected as one of two Conservative Party councillors for Ware Christchurch ward on East Hertfordshire District Council in May 2007, but stood down in April 2009 after he had won the nomination as Conservative Party prospective parliamentary candidate for Colchester.

He stood unsuccessfully as the Conservative candidate at the 2010 general election for the Colchester seat, coming second behind the incumbent Liberal Democrat MP Sir Bob Russell. Following the electoral defeat, he had roles as a trainee solicitor with the law firm Asher Prior Bates, and as a solicitor with the law firm Thompson Smith and Puxon. Quince was elected as a Conservative councillor for Prettygate ward on Colchester Borough Council at the 2011 local elections, and served as leader of the Conservative group on the council from 2011 to 2014, when he stepped down to focus on the forthcoming general election.

=== Parliamentary career ===
After his defeat in 2010, Quince was successful at the 2015 general election and was elected as the Member of Parliament (MP) for Colchester, replacing the incumbent Liberal Democrat Sir Bob Russell. In May 2016, it was reported that Quince was one of a number of Conservative MPs being investigated by police in the 2015 party spending investigation, for allegedly spending more than the legal limit on constituency election campaign expenses. In May 2017, the Crown Prosecution Service said that while there was evidence of inaccurate spending returns, it did not "meet the test" for further action. He campaigned for the UK to leave the European Union during the 2016 referendum.

On 6 September 2016, after a bet on Twitter by a local constituent, Quince auditioned for the TV show Britain's Got Talent in order to raise money for charity. £1,000 was raised for local charities.

In March 2017, The Daily Telegraph reported that Quince was one of nine MPs who had claimed Amazon Prime subscriptions on their parliamentary expenses. The Independent Parliamentary Standards Authority, responsible for handling expenses claims, told the paper subscriptions could be claimed but MPs must "justify the subscription is primarily used for parliamentary purposes". He responded that he had claimed the TV package in error and was repaying the cost.

In December 2017, he was one of three MPs warned by the UK's data privacy regulator about sharing work computer passwords. Quince has stated that his computer is routinely left unlocked to enable staff to use it.

In 2018, he was appointed parliamentary private secretary (PPS) to the Secretary of State for Defence Gavin Williamson. Quince has sat on the Commons Reference Group on Representation and Inclusion, on the Home Affairs Committee and on the Transport Committee. On 23 October 2018, he resigned from the Commons Reference Group on Representation and Inclusion citing lack of confidence in Bercow's ability to tackle bullying and sexual harassment problems in Parliament. Quince resigned as PPS on 8 December 2018, in opposition to the Brexit Withdrawal Agreement and Political Declaration.

In April 2019, Quince was appointed Parliamentary Under-Secretary of State for Welfare Delivery during the second May ministry. At the formation of the first Johnson ministry in July 2019, he was retained in post by Prime Minister Boris Johnson.

The Essex County Standard newspaper reported that Quince had accepted donations of two items in 2019 from the Russian-born businessman Alexander Temerko. The items raised £5,750 in an auction to help fund Quince's re-election campaign as an MP. Quince said that Temerko was "a British citizen". The donated items were declared as part of the register of members' financial interests.

On 17 September 2021, Quince was appointed Parliamentary Under-Secretary of State for Children and Families at the Department for Education, during the second cabinet reshuffle of the second Johnson ministry.

On 6 July 2022, in the wake of the resignations of Chancellor Rishi Sunak and Health Secretary Sajid Javid, Quince resigned from government after "accepting and repeating assurances to the media [from No 10] which have now been found to be inaccurate". The following day, after Johnson resigned, he accepted the role of Minister of State in the Department of Education.

On 7 September 2022, Quince was appointed Minister of State in the Department of Health and Social Care as part of Liz Truss's cabinet. On 26 October 2022, he was reappointed by Prime Minister Rishi Sunak. On 13 November 2023, he resigned from his post as part of Sunak's 2023 cabinet reshuffle. Quince did not seek re-election as an MP at the 2024 general election.

== Post-parliamentary career ==
In January 2026, Quince was appointed as the first Chief Executive of the 1001 Critical Days Foundation, a children's charity created by Dame Andrea Leadsom.

== Personal life ==
Quince is married and has two daughters. He and his family live in Colchester.

In February 2017, a 40-year-old man from Southwark was arrested and received a police caution for malicious communications after sending a series of abusive Twitter messages to Quince.

In February 2021, Quince said that he had lost six and a half stone (41 kg) in 2020.

== Notes ==
Parliament of the United Kingdom
Preceded by Bob Russell	Member of Parliament for Colchester; 2015–2024	Succeeded by Pam Cox
Political offices
Preceded by Robin Walker	Minister of State for School Standards; 2022	Succeeded by Jonathan Gullis
