= Derek Sweeting =

Chair of the Bar Council

The Honourable Mr Justice Sweeting
- Royal coat of arms of the United Kingdom

Justice of the High Court
- Incumbent
- Assumed office 11 January 2022
- Appointed by: Elizabeth II

Personal details
- Born: United Kingdom
- Education: Clare College, Cambridge; Royal Military Academy Sandhurst

Sir Derek Anthony Sweeting is a British High Court judge.

== Early life ==
Sweeting grew up in Greater London, attending a state school and later studying law at Clare College, Cambridge.

Before undertaking his Law degree, he served in the British Army for 1 year. He trained at Royal Military Academy Sandhurst and was deployed to West Germany as a Tank Commander. Upon completion of his studies in Cambridge, he enlisted as a Reservist and served for many years in 289 Commando Battery RA (V) and 266 Parachute Battery RA (V).

== Career ==
Sweeting was called to the Bar in 1983 by Middle Temple and was appointed King's Counsel in 2001.

Before becoming a High Court judge, he practiced at the Barristers' chambers ‘7BR’.

=== Bar Council ===
He was appointed as Chair of the Bar council in 2021 until 2022.

In April 2021, Sweeting questioned whether the term 'BAME' (Black, Asian, and Minority ethnic) could "disguise the fact that there's massive under-representation of black members of our community at the bar".

=== Judicial career ===
Sweeting was appointed as a Recorder in the Crown Court and County Court on 15 March 2002.

On 11 January 2022, Sweeting was appointed as a High Court Judge. He was assigned to the King's Bench Division by the Lord Chief Justice. He received his customary knighthood in July 2023, at Windsor Castle.
