= Parliamentary Under-Secretary of State for Welfare Delivery =

Junior office of the British government

- Royal Arms of His Majesty's Government
- Incumbent; Vacant since 20 September 2022
- Department for Work and Pensions
- Style: Minister
- Nominator: Prime Minister of the United Kingdom
- Appointer: The Monarch; on advice of the Prime Minister
- Term length: At His Majesty's pleasure
- Formation: May 2015
- First holder: Shailesh Vara
- Website: www.gov.uk/government/ministers/parliamentary-under-secretary-of-state-for-welfare-delivery

The Parliamentary Under-Secretary of State for Welfare Delivery was a junior position in the Department for Work and Pensions in the British government. It was most recently held by David Rutley MP, who took the office on 17 September 2021.

== Responsibilities ==
The minister has the following responsibilities:

- overall management and delivery of Universal Credit
- support for disadvantaged groups in Universal Credit including care leavers, prison leavers, survivors of domestic abuse, people with drug or alcohol dependency, rough sleepers and those who are facing homelessness
- housing policy and Housing Benefit delivery
- ‘Help to Claim’ service
- poverty
- benefit uprating
- military covenant
- fraud, error and debt

== Officeholders ==
Name	Portrait	Entered office	Left office	Political party	Prime Minister
Shailesh Vara		8 May 2015	17 July 2016	Conservative	David Cameron
Caroline Nokes		17 July 2016	4 April 2019	Conservative	Theresa May
Will Quince		4 April 2019	17 September 2021	Conservative	Boris Johnson
David Rutley		17 September 2021	20 September 2022	Conservative	Boris Johnson
