= Shailesh Vara =

British Conservative politician

The Right Honourable Shailesh Vara
- Official portrait, 2022

Secretary of State for Northern Ireland
- In office 7 July 2022 – 6 September 2022
- Prime Minister: Boris Johnson
- Preceded by: Brandon Lewis
- Succeeded by: Chris Heaton-Harris

Minister of State for Northern Ireland
- In office 9 January 2018 – 15 November 2018
- Prime Minister: Theresa May
- Preceded by: Chloe Smith
- Succeeded by: John Penrose

Parliamentary Under-Secretary of State for Welfare Delivery
- In office 8 May 2015 – 17 July 2016
- Prime Minister: David Cameron
- Preceded by: Office established
- Succeeded by: Caroline Nokes

Parliamentary Under-Secretary of State for Courts and Legal Aid
- In office 7 October 2013 – 13 July 2016
- Prime Minister: David Cameron
- Preceded by: Helen Grant
- Succeeded by: Oliver Heald

Member of Parliament for North West Cambridgeshire
- In office 5 May 2005 – 30 May 2024
- Preceded by: Brian Mawhinney
- Succeeded by: Sam Carling

Assistant Government Whip
- In office 12 May 2010 – 6 September 2012
- Prime Minister: David Cameron

Personal details
- Born: Shailesh Lakhman Vara; 4 September 1960 (age 66) Uganda Protectorate
- Party: Conservative
- Spouse: Beverley Vara
- Children: 2
- Education: Brunel University (LLB); University of Law (LPC)
- Website: www.shaileshvara.com

Shailesh Lakhman Vara (/ˈʃaɪlɛʃ ˈvɑːrə/, born 4 September 1960) is a British Conservative former politician who was the Member of Parliament (MP) for North West Cambridgeshire from 2005 until 2024. He was the UK's first Hindu MP. He also served as Secretary of State for Northern Ireland from July to September 2022.

In 2006 he was appointed to the shadow ministerial post of Shadow Deputy Leader of the House of Commons by David Cameron. Vara served in the Cameron government and was the conservative party's first ethnic minority minister in the House of Commons when in May 2010, he was appointed to the government front bench as an Assistant Whip. On 15 May 2012 he became the first ethnic minority to speak for the conservatives from the Dispatch Box when he stepped in at Justice Questions when two Justice Ministers (Kenneth Clarke, Lord Chancellor and Nick Herbert, Minister of State) were unable to attend. He was also Parliamentary Under-Secretary of State for Courts and Legal Aid from 2013 to 2016 and as Parliamentary Under-Secretary of State for Work and Pensions from 2015 to 2016. He returned to the backbenches in July 2016, having been removed from his positions by the new prime minister Theresa May. In the January 2018 reshuffle, he re-entered government as Minister of State at the Northern Ireland Office (NIO), serving under Karen Bradley. In November 2018, Vara resigned from this role in opposition to May's draft Brexit withdrawal agreement. During the July 2022 United Kingdom government crisis, Vara was appointed by Boris Johnson as Secretary of State for Northern Ireland but was dismissed by Liz Truss on 6 September 2022.

In 2014, Vara was awarded the Pravasi Bharatiya Samman by the President of India, Pranab Mukherjee. It is the highest award for Indian origin persons living abroad. Vara received the award for promoting ties between the UK and India, and for being the first Indian origin minister for the Conservative party.

== Early life and career ==
Shailesh Vara was born on 4 September 1960 in Uganda to Gujarati Indian immigrants. He moved to Britain with his family in 1964 and had a Hindu upbringing. Vara went to Aylesbury Grammar School, before studying law at Brunel University and then at the University of Law, where he qualified as a solicitor.

He worked in the City of London and West End of London, as well as in Hong Kong from 1989-1990. Vara has been a senior legal adviser and business consultant for London First, and is a former vice-president of the Small Business Bureau.

== Political career ==
Vara has been involved with the Conservative Party since the late 1980s and has held various posts at local, regional and national levels. He served as a Vice-Chairman of the Conservative Party from 2001 to 2005. In this position, he had a broad range of responsibilities, including advising Michael Howard, deputising for the Party chairman, party spokesman with the media and looking after Conservative Future (which comprises the 10,000 or so people in the party under 30).

Since the 1990s Vara spoke frequently at Party Conferences including opening key debates on the economy and law and order.

At the 1997 general election, Vara stood in Birmingham Ladywood, coming second with 13.3% of the vote behind the incumbent Labour MP Clare Short.

At the Conservative Party Conference in 2000, he was awarded the accolade of official "rising star" of the Party, with Lord Alexander of Weedon describing him as a "future Conservative Party leader".

Vara stood in Northampton South in the 2001 general election, coming second with 41.1% of the vote behind the incumbent Labour MP Tony Clarke.

In November 2000, Clarke caused controversy when he said his chances of success against Vara were increased because Vara, as a Ugandan born Hindu, was "unable to rely on the Asian vote" in a town with Muslim communities. Clarke added that "the 20% rural [vote] have shown themselves in the past to be quite racist in their voting."

== Parliamentary career ==
At the 2005 general election, Vara was elected to Parliament as MP for North West Cambridgeshire with 45.8% of the vote and a majority of 9,833.

The Breast Cancer Bill was Vara's chosen issue after he was one of 20 MPs who were selected at random to introduce a private member's bill to the House of Commons in 2006. He has campaigned to broaden the age of routine breast cancer screening for women from 50–70 age group to 45–75 years. The proposal was not supported by the then Labour government, which Vara claimed effectively blocked its progress by talking through to the end of the debate.

Vara gave his backing to Breast Cancer Campaign's (BCC) award-winning national "wear it pink" day, and showed his support for breast cancer charity Breakthrough Breast Cancer at a meeting in the House of Commons.

At the 2010 general election, Vara was re-elected as MP for North West Cambridgeshire with an increased vote share of 50.5% and an increased majority of 16,677. He was again re-elected at the 2015 general election with an increased vote share of 52.5% and an increased majority of 19,795.

Vara was opposed to Brexit prior to the 2016 Brexit referendum in June 2016.

At the snap 2017 general election, Vara was again re-elected, with an increased vote share of 58.6% and a decreased majority of 18,008.

Early on 15 November 2018, Vara announced his resignation as a Northern Ireland Minister on Twitter, posting his letter of resignation. His resignation followed the previous day's marathon-length cabinet meeting to discuss the draft Brexit withdrawal agreement.

In the 2019 Conservative leadership election, he initially backed the ultimately unsuccessful candidacy of Dominic Raab.

At the 2019 general election, Vara was again re-elected, with an increased vote share of 62.5% and an increased majority of 25,983.

In November 2019, Vara stood unsuccessfully for the role of Speaker of the House of Commons.

Following the State Opening of Parliament by HM Queen Elizabeth II on 11 March 2021, Vara had the honour, usually reserved for a senior parliamentarian, to propose the Loyal Address, starting the five day Queen's speech debate at the start of a new Parliamentary session. The speech is normally delivered to a packed House of Commons but uniquely, on this occasion, during the COVID pandemic, Vara spoke of the "dark shadow" of the pandemic as he addressed a much smaller number of MP's, all socially distanced and wearing safety masks

On 7 July 2022, Vara was appointed as Secretary of State for Northern Ireland by outgoing Prime Minister Boris Johnson, replacing Brandon Lewis. He was sworn as a member of Her Majesty's Most Honourable Privy Council on 8 July, entitling him to the style "The Right Honourable" for life. He was dismissed by Liz Truss on 6 September.

In May 2024, Vara presented a New Bhagavad Gita, one of Hinduism's most sacred texts to the Speaker of the House of Commons, Sir Lindsay Hoyle. The Gita was blessed at a temple in Mayapur India, and following the July 2024 general election it has been used by Hindu MPs taking the oath of allegiance to the Crown, before taking their seats in Parliament.

At the 2024 general election, Vara lost his seat by 39 votes to Labour's Sam Carling.

== Personal life ==
Vara has a black belt in taekwondo; and is a former instructor of the martial art. He is married to Beverley and has two sons, Sam and Max.

He had a brief appearance in the Oscar-winning film the "The Iron Lady", starring Meryl Streep; and is mentioned in the credits.

Vara was made an Honorary fellow of Brunel University in 2010.

Parliament of the United Kingdom
| Preceded by Brian Mawhinney | Member of Parliament for North West Cambridgeshire; 2005–2024 | Succeeded by Sam Carling |
Political offices
| Preceded by Brandon Lewis | Secretary of State for Northern Ireland; 2022 | Succeeded by Chris Heaton-Harris |
