= Nick Gibb =

British politician (born 1960)

The Right Honourable Sir Nick Gibb
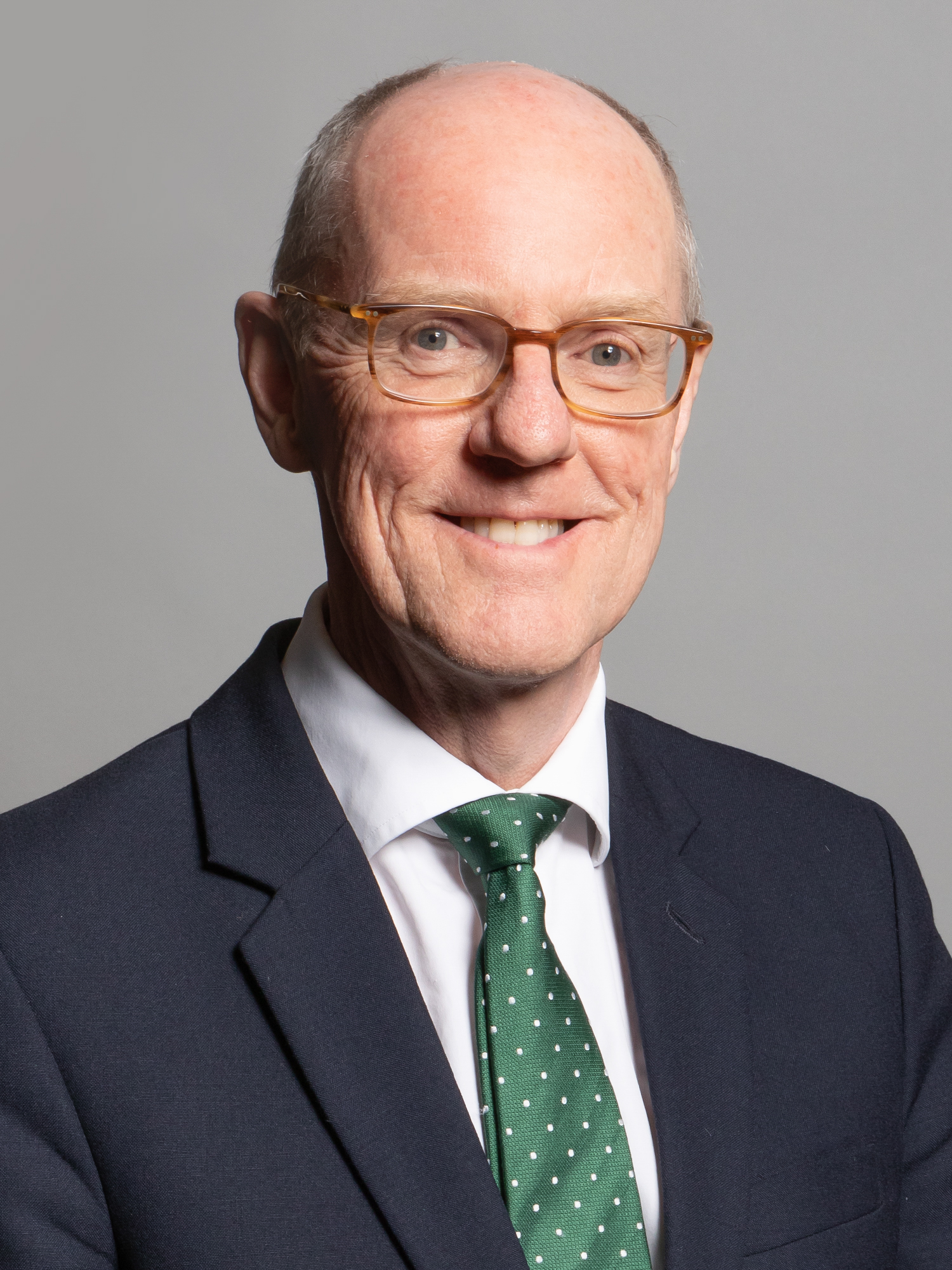
- Official portrait, 2020

Minister of State for Schools (Note: School Reform (2014–2015); School Standards (2015–2021).)
- In office 26 October 2022 – 13 November 2023
- Prime Minister: Rishi Sunak
- Preceded by: Jonathan Gullis
- Succeeded by: Damian Hinds
- In office 15 July 2014 – 15 September 2021
- Prime Minister: David Cameron; Theresa May; Boris Johnson
- Preceded by: David Laws (Note: Gibb was appointed to a new position as Minister of State for School Reform on 15 July 2014 and had no immediate predecessor; his position was retitled Minister of State for School Standards and he took over Laws' School Standards portfolio on 12 May 2015.)
- Succeeded by: Robin Walker
- In office 13 May 2010 – 4 September 2012
- Prime Minister: David Cameron
- Preceded by: Vernon Coaker
- Succeeded by: David Laws

Member of Parliament for Bognor Regis and Littlehampton
- In office 1 May 1997 – 30 May 2024
- Preceded by: Constituency created
- Succeeded by: Alison Griffiths

Personal details
- Born: 3 September 1960 (age 66) Amersham, Buckinghamshire, England
- Party: Conservative
- Spouse: Michael Simmonds (m. 2015)
- Relations: Sir Robbie Gibb (brother); Will Buxton (cousin)
- Education: College of St Hild and St Bede, Durham University (BA)
- Website: nickgibb.org.uk

Sir Nicolas John Gibb (born 3 September 1960) is a British politician who served as Minister of State for Schools from 2010 to 2012; 2014 to 2021 and from 2022 to 2023. He has served at the Department for Education under Conservative Prime Ministers David Cameron, Theresa May, Boris Johnson and Rishi Sunak. A member of the Conservative Party, Gibb served as Member of Parliament (MP) for Bognor Regis and Littlehampton from 1997 to 2024.

Gibb was born in Amersham, Buckinghamshire, and was educated at the College of St Hild and St Bede at the University of Durham. After unsuccessfully campaigning to become an MP in Stoke-on-Trent Central at the 1992 general election and Rotherham in the 1994 by-election, Gibb was elected to the British House of Commons for Bognor Regis and Littlehampton at the 1997 general election.

Gibb was Shadow Minister for Schools from 2005 to 2010. He was appointed Minister of State for Schools by Prime Minister David Cameron, serving from May 2010 and September 2012. After serving as a backbencher for two years, Gibb returned to government as Minister of State for School Reform in July 2014. Gibb's portfolio returned to its previous name as Minister of State for Schools after the 2015 general election. He retained this position during the premiership of Theresa May, though it was retitled Minister of State for School Standards. He was retained as Minister of State for School Standards by May's successor, Boris Johnson; Gibb was removed from the role by Johnson in September 2021. He returned as Minister of State for Schools under Rishi Sunak in October 2022 and voluntarily left Government in the November 2023 reshuffle.

== Early life and career ==
Nicolas Gibb was born on 3 September 1960 in Amersham, Buckinghamshire, and was educated at the private Bedford Modern School, the grammar school Maidstone Grammar School, the comprehensive Roundhay School in Leeds, and Thornes House School in Wakefield. In an interview regarding his education, Gibb spoke of how he believed Maidstone Grammar School to be the best. "What was good about it was that it was rigorous" he told Teachers TV in 2006. "Every lesson was rigorous, even things like music: it was taught in the same way as chemistry". Wakefield, by contrast, was "terrible" due to its lack of rigour. Upon leaving school he took a job as a handyman in a London hotel, spending his evenings in the House of Commons watching late-night debates from the public gallery.

He then attended the College of St Hild and St Bede at the University of Durham where he received a Bachelor of Arts degree in Law in 1981. Gibb was a member of the Federation of Conservative Students at a time when they were influenced by radical libertarian ideas. He stood for election to the NUS committee in 1981, but only achieved a single vote after accusing the NUS of openly supporting terrorist organisations.

After leaving university Gibb was implicated in a scandal involving nomination papers for elections at the 1982 NUS conference in Blackpool, with Gibb accused of forging signatures to get Conservative candidates on to the ballot. Gibb and his brother Robbie were recruited and trained by the Russian anticommunist organisation the National Alliance of Russian Solidarists. In 1982, Gibb joined NatWest as a trainee accountant, before working on Kibbutz Merom Golan in 1983. In 1984 he joined KPMG as a chartered accountant until his election to parliament. He is a Fellow of the Institute of Chartered Accountants (FCA).

Gibb stood as the Conservative candidate in Stoke-on-Trent Central at the 1992 general election, coming second with 27.9% of the vote behind the incumbent Labour MP Mark Fisher.

In 1994, Gibb stood in the Rotherham by-election, coming third with 9.9% of the vote behind the Labour candidate Denis MacShane and the Liberal Democrat candidate.

== Political career ==
At the 1997 general election, Gibb was elected to Parliament as MP for Bognor Regis and Littlehampton with 44.2% of the vote and a majority of 7,321. He made his maiden speech on 4 July 1997.

Shortly after his election, Gibb joined the opposition frontbench of William Hague when he was appointed as the spokesman on trade and industry in 1997, before joining the social security select committee later in the year. The following year, in 1998 he rejoined the frontbench as a spokesman on the treasury, moving back to trade and industry in 1999.

Gibb was reportedly involved in the faction-fight between supporters of William Hague and Michael Portillo, the then shadow chancellor, as a supporter of Portillo.

At the 2001 general election, Gibb was re-elected as MP for Bognor Regis and Littlehampton with an increased vote share of 45.2% and a decreased majority of 5,643.

Following the election, Gibb was briefly a spokesman on environment, transport and the regions but resigned under the leadership of Iain Duncan Smith, reportedly because he was unhappy at his new role.

Gibb was again re-elected at the 2005 general election, with a decreased vote share of 44.6% and an increased majority of 7,822.

Michael Howard brought Gibb back to the frontbench in 2005 as a spokesman for Education and Young People. Shortly afterwards, the newly elected Conservative Party Leader, David Cameron, promoted Gibb from within the education team to Shadow Minister for Schools.

Gibb is a longstanding advocate of synthetic phonics as a method of teaching children to read, having first publicly raised this in 2006.

At the 2010 general election, Gibb was again re-elected, with an increased vote share of 51.4% and an increased majority of 13,063.

After the formation of a Conservative-Liberal Democrat coalition government, Gibb was appointed Minister of State for Schools in the new Department for Education. He was sacked in a reshuffle in September 2012, but returned to the same department, again as a Minister of State, in July 2014.

Just days after being appointed as Minister for Schools in 2010, Gibb was criticised by teachers and educationalists after leaked information suggested he had told officials at the Department of Education that he "would rather have a physics graduate from Oxbridge without a PGCE teaching in a school than a physics graduate from one of the rubbish universities with a PGCE".

In 2012 Gibb was reported to have described attempts to include public speaking classes intending to foster empowerment among public students as "encouraging idle chatter in class". This statement was criticised by researchers at both Cambridge University and the Education Endowment Foundation who observed a link between public speaking classes and improved academic results and economic potential.

He was sacked in a reshuffle in September 2012, but returned to the same department, again as a Minister of State, in July 2014.

Gibb was again re-elected at the 2015 general election, with a decreased vote share of 51.3% and an increased majority of 13,944.

He supported the Remain campaign in the 2016 Brexit referendum. In November of the same year, he was appointed to the Privy Council.

At the snap 2017 general election, Gibb was again re-elected, with an increased vote share of 59% and an increased majority of 17,494. He was again re-elected at the 2019 general election with an increased vote share of 63.5% and an increased majority of 22,503.

In July 2020, as Minister of State for School Standards his department oversaw the controversial derivation of A-level grades in place of exams cancelled due to the COVID-19 pandemic. The system was subsequently described as having the effect of "people who come from areas where people have scored low are assumed to score low this year, and people who come from areas where people have scored high are assumed to score high this year". He was later confronted on the BBC Radio 4 programme Any Questions? by a student stating that Gibb had "ruined my life". Gibb responded by saying: "It won't ruin your life, it will be sorted, I can assure you."

Gibb was sacked by the Prime Minister Boris Johnson in the September 2021 reshuffle and returned to the back benches.

On 4 February 2022, Gibb called for the Prime Minister to resign over Partygate. It was reported he had submitted a letter of no confidence in Johnson to the chairman of the 1922 Committee.

Gibb was re-appointed as Schools Minister on 26 October 2022 by Rishi Sunak. His resigned this post on 13 November 2023, and announced that he would stand down from Parliament at the 2024 general election. This was after he had been reselected in March.

== Post-parliament career ==
In May 2025, Gibb joined the phone pouch company Yondr as a strategy adviser.

== Personal life ==
Gibb is the brother of Sir Robbie Gibb, a former PR consultant and ex-editor of the BBC's political programmes, The Daily Politics and (in an executive capacity) This Week, who was announced as Director of Communications for Prime Minister Theresa May in July 2017.

In May 2015, Gibb came out as gay and announced his engagement to Michael Simmonds, the chief executive of the Populus polling organisation. Having been together for 29 years they married in 2015.

== Publications ==
- Forgotten Closed Shop: Case for Voluntary Membership of Student Unions by Nicholas Gibb and David Neil-Smith, 1985, Cleveland Press ISBN 0-948194-01-4
- Simplifying Taxes by Nick Gibb, 1987
- Duty to Repeal by Nick Gibb, 1989, Adam Smith Institute ISBN 1-870109-71-6
- Bucking the Market by Nick Gibb, 1990
- Maintaining Momentum by Nick Gibb, 1992

== Notes ==
Parliament of the United Kingdom
New constituency	Member of Parliament for Bognor Regis and Littlehampton; 1997–2024	Succeeded by Alison Griffiths
Political offices
Preceded by Vernon Coaker	Minister of State for School Standards; 2010–2012	Succeeded by David Laws
Preceded by Liz Truss as Parliamentary Under-Secretary of State for Education and Childcare	Minister of State for School Reform; 2014–2015	Position abolished
Preceded by David Laws	Minister of State for School Standards; 2015–2021	Succeeded by Robin Walker
