= Parliamentary Under-Secretary of State for Apprenticeships and Skills =

UK government position

- Royal Arms of His Majesty's Government
- Incumbent; Vacant since 6 July 2022
- Department for Education
- Style: Minister
- Nominator: Prime Minister of the United Kingdom
- Appointer: The Monarch; on advice of the Prime Minister
- Term length: At His Majesty's pleasure
- Website: Official website

The Parliamentary Under-Secretary of State for Apprenticeships and Skills (also known as Apprenticeships and Skills Minister) is a junior ministerial position in the Department for Education in the British government. It was held by Alex Burghart MP, who took office on 17 September 2021, until his resignation on 6 July 2022.

== Responsibilities ==
The minister is responsible for the following:

- Strategy for post-16 education (jointly with Minister of State for Universities)
- Technical education and skills including T Levels and qualifications review
- Apprenticeships including traineeships
- Further education workforce
- Further education provider market including quality and improvement and further education efficiency
- Adult education, including the National Retraining Scheme and basic skills
- Institutes of Technology and National Colleges
- Reducing the number of young people who are not in education, employment or training
- Careers education, information and guidance including the Careers and Enterprise Company
- Coronavirus (COVID-19) response for further education services

== List of ministers ==
Name	Term start	Term end	Party	Title	Prime Minister
Kevin Brennan	9 June 2009	6 May 2010	Labour	Minister of State for Further Education, Skills, Apprenticeships and Consumer Affairs (Note: Jointly with the Department for Business, Innovation and Skills and the Department for Children, Schools and Families.)	Gordon Brown
John Hayes	13 May 2010	4 September 2012	Conservative	Minister of State for Further Education, Skills and Lifelong Learning	David Cameron
Matt Hancock	6 September 2012	15 July 2014	Conservative	Minister of State for Skills and Enterprise	David Cameron
Nick Boles	14 July 2014	13 July 2016	Conservative	Minister of State for Skills	David Cameron
Robert Halfon	17 July 2016	12 June 2017	Conservative	Minister of State for Skills	Theresa May
Anne Milton	12 June 2017	23 July 2019	Conservative	Minister of State for Skills and Apprenticeships	Theresa May
Gillian Keegan	14 February 2020	16 September 2021	Conservative	Parliamentary Under-Secretary of State for Apprenticeships and Skills	Boris Johnson
Alex Burghart	17 September 2021	6 July 2022	Conservative	Parliamentary Under-Secretary of State for Apprenticeships and Skills	Boris Johnson
Role merged with Minister of State for Higher and Further Education
