= Cameron–Clegg coalition =

Government of the United Kingdom (2010–2015)

- Cabinet of the United Kingdom
- 2010–2015
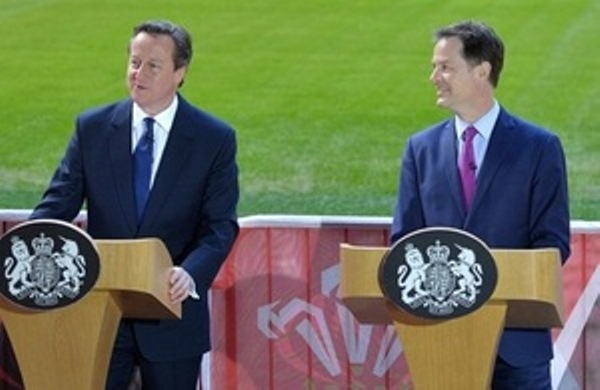
- Cameron (left) and Clegg (right) in February 2015
- Date formed: 11 May 2010
- Date dissolved: 8 May 2015

People and organisations
- Monarch: Elizabeth II
- Prime Minister: David Cameron
- Prime Minister's history: Premiership of David Cameron
- Deputy Prime Minister: Nick Clegg
- First Secretary: William Hague
- Ministers removed: 2012 cabinet reshuffle; 2014 cabinet reshuffle
- Member parties: Conservative Party; Liberal Democrats
- Status in legislature: Majority (coalition)
- Opposition cabinet: First Harman shadow cabinet; Miliband shadow cabinet
- Opposition party: Labour Party
- Opposition leader: Harriet Harman (2010); Ed Miliband (2010–2015)

History
- Incoming formation: 2010 government formation
- Election: 2010 general election
- Outgoing election: 2015 general election
- Legislature terms: 2010–2015 for 5 years per FTPA
- Budgets: June 2010 budget; 2011 budget; 2012 budget; 2013 budget; 2014 budget; March 2015 budget
- Predecessor: Brown ministry
- Successor: Second Cameron ministry

The Cameron–Clegg coalition was formed by David Cameron and Nick Clegg when Cameron was invited by Queen Elizabeth II to form a new government, following the resignation of Prime Minister Gordon Brown on 11 May 2010, after the general election on 6 May. It was the UK's first coalition government since the Churchill war ministry ended in 1945.

The coalition was led by Cameron as prime minister with Clegg as deputy prime minister and composed of members of both Cameron's centre-right Conservative Party and Clegg's centrist Liberal Democrats. The Cabinet was made up of sixteen Conservatives and five Liberal Democrats, with eight other Conservatives and one other Liberal Democrat attending cabinet but not members. The coalition was succeeded by the single-party, second Cameron ministry following the 2015 election.

== History ==
The previous Parliament had been dissolved on 12 April 2010 in advance of the general election on 6 May. The general election resulted in a hung parliament, with no single party having an overall majority in the House of Commons, for the first time in 36 years. The Conservatives emerged having the most seats, but 20 short of an overall majority.

In the Conservative–Liberal Democrat coalition agreement of 11 May 2010, the two parties formed a coalition government. The new Parliament met on 18 May for the swearing-in of peers in the House of Lords and newly elected and returning members of parliament in the House of Commons, and the election for the speakership of the House of Commons. The Queen's Speech on 25 May set out the government's legislative agenda. Of the 57 Liberal Democrat MPs, only two refused to support the Conservative Coalition agreement, with former leader Charles Kennedy and Manchester Withington MP John Leech both rebelling.

The Liberal Democrats had five Cabinet members, including Nick Clegg as deputy prime minister, though after the Cabinet and ministerial reshuffle, David Laws, who was a Minister of State, was allowed to attend the Cabinet but was not a full member. If a Liberal Democrat minister resigned or was removed from office, another member of the same party would have had to be appointed to the Cabinet.

Each cabinet committee had a chair from one party and a deputy chair from the other; there was also a cabinet committee specifically overseeing the operation of the coalition. Both parties' ministers shared collective responsibility for the government's positions, although the coalition agreement detailed several issues on which the parties agreed to differ; the Liberal Democrats abstained from voting in such cases. Clegg, as Deputy Prime Minister, took Prime Minister's Questions (PMQs) when David Cameron was unavailable.

Key decisions were made by a core group called the "Quad", made up of Cameron, Clegg, Chancellor of the Exchequer George Osborne and Chief Secretary to the Treasury Danny Alexander, which decided "all major matters of policy" and resolved disputes between the two parties.

While the government's front benchers sat together in the House of Commons and the two parties acted as a bloc during PMQs, the Liberal Democrat and Conservative backbenchers sat apart and each had their own whips, and the two parties competed in by-elections. On 4 September 2012, Cameron reshuffled his cabinet for the first time. He reshuffled his cabinet for the second time on 14 July 2014.

== Cabinets ==
=== May 2010 – September 2012 ===
Party key	Conservative
Party key	Liberal Democrat

First Cabinet of Cameron–Clegg Coalition
Portfolio	Portrait	Minister	Term
Cabinet ministers
Prime Minister; First Lord of the Treasury; Minister for the Civil Service		David Cameron	2010–16
Deputy Prime Minister; Lord President of the Council		Nick Clegg	2010–15
First Secretary of State; Foreign Secretary		William Hague	2010–14
Chancellor of the Exchequer		George Osborne	2010–16
Home Secretary; Minister for Women and Equality		Theresa May	2010–16
Lord High Chancellor of Great Britain; Secretary of State for Justice		Kenneth Clarke	2010–12
Secretary of State for Defence		Liam Fox	2010–11
Secretary of State for Defence		Philip Hammond	2011–14
Secretary of State for Business, Innovation and Skills; President of the Board of Trade		Vince Cable	2010–15
Secretary of State for Work and Pensions		Iain Duncan Smith	2010–16
Secretary of State for Energy and Climate Change		Chris Huhne	2010–12
Secretary of State for Energy and Climate Change		Ed Davey	2012–15
Secretary of State for Health		Andrew Lansley	2010–12
Secretary of State for Education		Michael Gove	2010–14
Secretary of State for Communities and Local Government		Eric Pickles	2010–15
Secretary of State for Transport		Philip Hammond	2010–11
Secretary of State for Transport		Justine Greening	2011–12
Secretary of State for Environment, Food and Rural Affairs		Caroline Spelman	2010–12
Secretary of State for International Development		Andrew Mitchell	2010–12
Secretary of State for Northern Ireland		Owen Paterson	2010–12
Secretary of State for Scotland		Danny Alexander	2010
Secretary of State for Scotland		Michael Moore	2010–13
Secretary of State for Wales		Cheryl Gillan	2010–12
Secretary of State for Culture, Olympics, Media and Sport		Jeremy Hunt	2010–12
Chief Secretary to the Treasury		David Laws	2010
Chief Secretary to the Treasury		Danny Alexander	2010–15
Leader of the House of Lords; Chancellor of the Duchy of Lancaster		Thomas Galbraith, 2nd Baron Strathclyde	2010–13
Minister without Portfolio		Sayeeda Warsi, Baroness Warsi	2010–12
Also attending cabinet meetings
Minister for the Cabinet Office; Paymaster General		Francis Maude	2010–15
Minister of State in the Cabinet Office		Oliver Letwin	2010–14
Minister of State for Universities and Science		David Willetts	2010–14
Leader of the House of Commons; Lord Keeper of the Privy Seal		Sir George Young, 6th Baronet	2010–12
Chief Whip in the House of Commons; Parliamentary Secretary to the Treasury		Patrick McLoughlin	2010–12
Also attends cabinet when ministerial responsibilities are on the agenda
Attorney General		Dominic Grieve	2010–14

==== Changes ====
- David Laws resigned as Chief Secretary to the Treasury on 29 May 2010 because of an expenses irregularity dating from the previous Parliament. He was replaced by Danny Alexander, who was in turn replaced as Secretary of State for Scotland by Michael Moore.
- On 14 October 2011 Liam Fox resigned as Secretary of State for Defence following the procurement of high-level overseas meetings attendance for his friend and advisor, Adam Werrity, working for a private contractor, and stated that he had "mistakenly allowed the distinction between my personal interest and my government activities to become blurred". His successor was Philip Hammond, who was replaced as Transport Secretary by Justine Greening, the Economic Secretary to the Treasury, who was in turn replaced by Chloe Smith, an assistant government whip: she was replaced in turn by Greg Hands.
- On 3 February 2012 Chris Huhne resigned as Secretary of State for Energy and Climate Change following the decision of the Crown Prosecution Service to prosecute him and his former wife. His successor was Ed Davey, who was replaced as a Parliamentary under-secretary of state in the Department of Business, Innovation and Skills by Norman Lamb, replaced in his previous dual roles by Jenny Willott as an Assistant Whip and Jo Swinson as the Parliamentary private secretary to the Deputy Prime Minister.

=== September 2012 – July 2014 ===
Party key	Conservative
Party key	Liberal Democrat

Second Cabinet of Cameron–Clegg Coalition
Portfolio	Portrait	Minister	Term
Cabinet ministers
Prime Minister; First Lord of the Treasury; Minister for the Civil Service		David Cameron	2010–16
Deputy Prime Minister; Lord President of the Council		Nick Clegg	2010–15
First Secretary of State; Foreign Secretary		William Hague	2010–14
Chancellor of the Exchequer		George Osborne	2010–16
Home Secretary		Theresa May	2010–16
Chief Secretary to the Treasury		Danny Alexander	2010–15
Secretary of State for Defence		Philip Hammond	2011–14
Secretary of State for Business, Innovation and Skills; President of the Board of Trade		Vince Cable	2010–15
Secretary of State for Work and Pensions		Iain Duncan Smith	2010–16
Lord High Chancellor of Great Britain; Secretary of State for Justice		Chris Grayling	2012–15
Secretary of State for Education		Michael Gove	2010–14
Secretary of State for Communities and Local Government		Eric Pickles	2010–15
Secretary of State for Health		Jeremy Hunt	2012–16
Leader of the House of Lords; Chancellor of the Duchy of Lancaster		Thomas Galbraith, 2nd Baron Strathclyde	2010–13
Leader of the House of Lords; Chancellor of the Duchy of Lancaster		Jonathan Hill, Baron Hill of Oareford	2013–14
Secretary of State for Environment, Food and Rural Affairs		Owen Paterson	2012–14
Secretary of State for International Development		Justine Greening	2012–16
Secretary of State for Scotland		Michael Moore	2010–13
Secretary of State for Scotland		Alistair Carmichael	2013–15
Secretary of State for Energy and Climate Change		Ed Davey	2012–15
Secretary of State for Transport		Patrick McLoughlin	2012–16
Secretary of State for Culture, Media and Sport; Minister for Equalities		Maria Miller	2012–14
Secretary of State for Culture, Media and Sport; Minister for Equalities		Sajid Javid	2014
Secretary of State for Northern Ireland		Theresa Villiers	2012–16
Secretary of State for Wales		David Jones	2012–14
Also attending cabinet meetings
Minister without Portfolio		Kenneth Clarke	2012–14
Leader of the House of Commons; Lord Keeper of the Privy Seal		Andrew Lansley	2012–14
Chief Whip in the House of Commons; Parliamentary Secretary to the Treasury		Andrew Mitchell	2012
Chief Whip in the House of Commons; Parliamentary Secretary to the Treasury		Sir George Young, 6th Baronet	2012–14
Minister for the Cabinet Office; Paymaster General		Francis Maude	2010–15
Minister of State for Government Policy		Oliver Letwin	2010–15
Minister of State for the Cabinet Office; Minister of State for Schools		David Laws	2012–15
Senior Minister of State for Foreign and Commonwealth Affairs; Senior Minister of State for Faith and Communities		Sayeeda Warsi, Baroness Warsi	2012–14
Minister of State for Universities and Science		David Willetts	2010–14
Financial Secretary to the Treasury		Sajid Javid	2013–14
Financial Secretary to the Treasury		Nicky Morgan	2014
Minister without Portfolio; Chairman of the Conservative Party		Grant Shapps	2012–15
Also attends cabinet when ministerial responsibilities are on the agenda
Attorney General		Dominic Grieve	2010–14
Minister of State for Cities and Constitution		Greg Clark	2012–14

==== Changes ====
- On 19 October 2012, Andrew Mitchell resigned as Government Chief Whip in the House of Commons following controversy surrounding an argument with police officers in Downing Street. He was replaced by Sir George Young.
- On 7 January 2013, Lord Strathclyde resigned as Leader of the House of Lords and Chancellor of the Duchy of Lancaster. He was replaced by Lord Hill of Oareford.
- On 7 October 2013, Michael Moore was replaced as Secretary of State for Scotland by Alistair Carmichael, during a reshuffle which focused on junior ministerial ranks.
- On 9 April 2014, Maria Miller resigned as Secretary of State for Culture, Media and Sport and Minister for Women and Equalities. She was replaced as Culture Secretary and Minister for Equalities by Sajid Javid, and by Nicky Morgan as Minister for Women. Morgan, who succeeded Javid as Financial Secretary to the Treasury, was not a full cabinet member but attended meetings in her role as Minister for Women.

=== July 2014 – May 2015 ===
Party key	Conservative
Party key	Liberal Democrat

Third Cabinet of Cameron–Clegg Coalition
Portfolio	Portrait	Minister	Term
Cabinet ministers
Prime Minister; First Lord of the Treasury; Minister for the Civil Service		David Cameron	2010–16
Deputy Prime Minister; Lord President of the Council		Nick Clegg	2010–15
First Secretary of State		William Hague	2010–15
Leader of the House of Commons		William Hague	2014–15
Chancellor of the Exchequer		George Osborne	2010–16
Home Secretary		Theresa May	2010–16
Foreign Secretary		Philip Hammond	2014–15
Lord High Chancellor of Great Britain; Secretary of State for Justice		Chris Grayling	2012–15
Secretary of State for Defence		Michael Fallon	2014–16
Secretary of State for Business, Innovation and Skills; President of the Board of Trade		Vince Cable	2010–15
Secretary of State for Work and Pensions		Iain Duncan Smith	2010–16
Secretary of State for Health		Jeremy Hunt	2012–16
Secretary of State for Communities and Local Government		Eric Pickles	2010–15
Minister for Faith		Eric Pickles	2014–15
Secretary of State for Education; Minister for Women and Equalities		Nicky Morgan	2014–16
Secretary of State for International Development		Justine Greening	2012–16
Secretary of State for Energy and Climate Change		Ed Davey	2012–15
Secretary of State for Transport		Patrick McLoughlin	2012–16
Secretary of State for Scotland		Alistair Carmichael	2013–15
Secretary of State for Northern Ireland		Theresa Villiers	2012–16
Secretary of State for Wales		Stephen Crabb	2014–16
Secretary of State for Culture, Media and Sport		Sajid Javid	2014–15
Secretary of State for Environment, Food and Rural Affairs		Liz Truss	2014–16
Chief Secretary to the Treasury		Danny Alexander	2010–15
Also attending cabinet meetings
Leader of the House of Lords; Lord Keeper of the Privy Seal		Tina Stowell, Baroness Stowell of Beeston	2014–16
Chief Whip in the House of Commons; Parliamentary Secretary to the Treasury		Michael Gove	2014–15
Minister for the Cabinet Office; Paymaster General		Francis Maude	2010–15
Minister of State for Government Policy		Oliver Letwin	2010–15
Chancellor of the Duchy of Lancaster		Oliver Letwin	2014–16
Minister of State for the Cabinet Office; Minister of State for Schools		David Laws	2012–15
Minister of State for Universities, Science and Cities		Greg Clark	2014–15
Attorney General		Jeremy Wright	2014–16
Minister without Portfolio; Chairman of the Conservative Party		Grant Shapps	2012–15
Minister of State for Business and Enterprise; Minister of State for Energy; Minister for Portsmouth		Matthew Hancock	2012–15
Minister of State for Employment		Esther McVey	2013–15
Minister of State for Faith and Communities		Sayeeda Warsi, Baroness Warsi	2012–14
Minister of State for Foreign and Commonwealth Affairs		Sayeeda Warsi, Baroness Warsi	2012–14
Minister of State for Foreign and Commonwealth Affairs		Joyce Anelay, Baroness Anelay of St John's	2014–16

==== Changes ====
- On 5 August 2014, Baroness Warsi resigned as Minister of State at the Foreign and Commonwealth Office, and as Minister for Faith and Community, in protest at the Government's response to the conflict in the Gaza Strip. She was replaced at the Foreign Office by Baroness Anelay of St John's, with Communities and Local Government Secretary Eric Pickles taking on Warsi's former Faith and Community brief.

== List of ministers ==
=== Prime Minister and Cabinet Office ===
Minister in the House of Commons	Minister in the House of Lords
Conservative	Liberal Democrat
Ministers in and attending Cabinet **in bold**

Prime Minister and Cabinet Office
Post	Minister	Term
**Prime Minister of the United Kingdom**; **First Lord of the Treasury**; **Minister for the Civil Service**	**David Cameron**	2010–2015
**Deputy Prime Minister of the United Kingdom**; **Lord President of the Council** (with special responsibility for political and constitutional reform)	**Nick Clegg**	2010–2015
Parliamentary Private Secretary to the Prime Minister	Desmond Swayne	2010–2012
Parliamentary Private Secretary to the Prime Minister	Sam Gyimah	2012–2013
Parliamentary Private Secretary to the Prime Minister	Gavin Williamson	2013–2015
Parliamentary Private Secretary to the Deputy Prime Minister	Norman Lamb	2010–2012
Parliamentary Private Secretary to the Deputy Prime Minister	Jo Swinson	2012
Parliamentary Private Secretary to the Deputy Prime Minister	Duncan Hames	2012–2015
**Minister for the Cabinet Office**; **Paymaster General**	**Francis Maude**	2010–2015
Minister providing support to the Deputy PM in the Cabinet Office (also in Treasury)	David Laws	2010
Minister providing support to the Deputy PM in the Cabinet Office (also in Treasury)	**Danny Alexander**	2010–2012
**Minister of State for Government Policy** (providing policy advice to the PM)	**Oliver Letwin**	2010–2015
**Chancellor of the Duchy of Lancaster**	**Oliver Letwin**	2014–2015
Minister of State for Cabinet Office, Minister Assisting the Deputy Prime Minister (also in Education)	**David Laws**	2012–2015
**Minister of State for Cabinet Office (Cities 2013–2015 and Constitution 2013–2014)**	**Greg Clark** (also Minister of State for Universities and Science 2014–2015)	2013–2015
Parliamentary Under-Secretary of State for the Civil Society	Nick Hurd	2010–2014
Parliamentary Under-Secretary of State for the Civil Society	Brooks Newmark	2014
Parliamentary Under-Secretary of State for the Civil Society	Rob Wilson	2014–2015
Parliamentary Secretary for the Cabinet Office for the Constitution	Mark Harper	2010–2012
Parliamentary Secretary for the Cabinet Office for the Constitution	Chloe Smith	2012–2013
Parliamentary Secretary for the Cabinet Office (also Number 10 Policy Unit Chief) (unpaid)	Jo Johnson	2013–2014
Minister of State for the Cabinet Office (also Number 10 Policy Unit Chief) (unpaid)	Jo Johnson	2014–2015
Parliamentary Under-secretary for the Cabinet Office (also Minister for the Constitution)	Sam Gyimah	2014–2015
**Minister without Portfolio**	Kenneth Clarke	2012–2014
**Minister without Portfolio**	John Hayes	2013–2014
**Minister without Portfolio** (also Chairman of the Conservative Party, a party-political position) (unpaid)	Sayeeda Warsi, Baroness Warsi	2010–2012
**Minister without Portfolio** (also Chairman of the Conservative Party, a party-political position) (unpaid)	**Grant Shapps**	2012–2015

=== Departments of State ===
Business, Innovation and Skills
**Secretary of State for Business, Innovation and Skills**, **President of the Board of Trade**	**Vince Cable**	2010–2015
**Minister of State for Universities and Science**	David Willetts	2010–2014
**Minister of State for Universities and Science**	**Greg Clark** (also with Cabinet Office and Minister for Cities)	2014–2015
Minister of State for Further Education, Skills and Lifelong Learning (jointly with Education)	John Hayes	2010–2012
Parliamentary Under-Secretary of State for Skills (jointly with Education)	Matt Hancock	2012–2013
Minister of State for Skills and Enterprise (jointly with Education)	Matthew Hancock	2013–2014
Minister of State for Skills and Equalities (jointly with Education)	Nick Boles	2014–2015
**Minister of State for Business and Enterprise**	Mark Prisk	2010–2012
**Minister of State for Business and Enterprise**	Michael Fallon	2012–2014
**Minister of State for Business and Enterprise**	**Matt Hancock** (jointly with Energy and Climate Change)	2014–2015
**Minister for Portsmouth**	Michael Fallon	2014
**Minister for Portsmouth**	**Matthew Hancock** (jointly with Energy and Climate Change)	2014–2015
Minister of State for Decentralisation and Planning Policy (jointly with Local communities)	Greg Clark (also Minister for Cities)	2011–2012
Minister of State for Trade and Investment (jointly with Foreign Office) (unpaid)	Stephen Green, Baron Green of Hurstpierpoint	2011–2013
Minister of State for Trade and Investment (jointly with Foreign Office) (unpaid)	Ian Livingston, Baron Livingston of Parkhead	2013–2015
Minister of State for Culture and Digital Industries (jointly with Culture)	Ed Vaizey	2014–2015
Parliamentary Under-Secretary of State for Employment Relations, Consumer and Postal Affairs	Ed Davey	2010–2012
Parliamentary Under-Secretary of State for Employment Relations, Consumer and Postal Affairs	Norman Lamb	2012
Parliamentary Under-Secretary of State for Employment Relations, Consumer and Postal Affairs	Jo Swinson (jointly as Under-Secretary of State for Women and Equalities)	2012 – Dec 2013, June 2014 – 2015
Parliamentary Under-Secretary of State for Employment Relations, Consumer and Postal Affairs	Jenny Willott (jointly as Under-Secretary of State for Women and Equalities and Assistant Whip)	Dec 2013– June 2014 (Maternity Cover)
Parliamentary Under-Secretary of State for Culture, Communications and Creative Industries (jointly with Culture)	Ed Vaizey	2010–2014
Parliamentary Under-Secretary of State for Intellectual property	Judith Wilcox, Baroness Wilcox	2010–2012
Parliamentary Under-Secretary of State for Intellectual property	Jonathan Marland, Baron Marland	2012–2013
Parliamentary Under-Secretary of State for Intellectual property	James Younger, 5th Viscount Younger of Leckie	2013–2014
Parliamentary Under-Secretary of State for Intellectual property	Lucy Neville-Rolfe, Baroness Neville-Rolfe	2014–2015
Parliamentary Under secretary of state for Life Sciences (jointly with Health)	George Freeman	2014–2015

Communities and Local Government
**Secretary of State for Communities and Local Government**	**Eric Pickles**	2010–2015
**Minister of State for Faith and Community**	Sayeeda Warsi, Baroness Warsi (also with Foreign and Commonwealth Affairs)	2012–2014
**Minister of State for Faith and Community**	Eric Pickles	2014–2015
**Minister of State for Housing and Local Government**	Grant Shapps	2010–2012
**Minister of State for Housing and Local Government**	Mark Prisk	2012–2013
**Minister of State for Housing and Local Government**	Kris Hopkins	2013–2014
**Minister of State for Housing and Local Government**	Brandon Lewis	2014–2015
**Minister of State for Decentralisation and Planning Policy** (jointly with Business 2011–2012)	Greg Clark (also Minister for Cities 2011–2012)	2010–2012
Parliamentary Under Secretary of State for Decentralisation	Nick Boles	2012–2014
Parliamentary Under Secretary of State for Decentralisation	Penny Mordaunt	2014–2015
Parliamentary Under-Secretaries of State	Andrew Stunell	2010–2012
Parliamentary Under-Secretaries of State	Don Foster	2012–2013
Parliamentary Under-Secretaries of State	Stephen Williams	2013–2015
Parliamentary Under-Secretaries of State	Bob Neill	2010–2012
Parliamentary Under-Secretaries of State	Brandon Lewis	2012–2014
Parliamentary Under-Secretaries of State	Kris Hopkins	2014–2015
Parliamentary Under-Secretaries of State	Joan Hanham, Baroness Hanham	2010–2013
Parliamentary Under-Secretaries of State	Tina Stowell, Baroness Stowell of Beeston	2013–2014
Parliamentary Under-Secretaries of State	Tariq Ahmad, Baron Ahmad of Wimbledon	2014–2015

Culture, Media and Sport
**Secretary of State for Culture, Media and Sport**	Jeremy Hunt	2010–2012
**Secretary of State for Culture, Media and Sport**	Maria Miller (jointly as Minister for Women and Equalities)	2012–2014
**Secretary of State for Culture, Media and Sport**	**Sajid Javid**(also Minister for Equalities Apr–Jul 2014)	2014–2015
Minister for Women	Nicky Morgan	2014 Apr–Jul
Minister of State for Sport, Olympic Legacy Tourism	Hugh Robertson	2012–2013
Minister of State for Sport, Tourism and Equalities (jointly with Government Equalities)	Helen Grant	2013–2014
Minister of State for Sport and Tourism	Helen Grant	2014–2015
Minister for Tourism and Heritage	John Penrose	2010–2012
Parliamentary Under-Secretary of State for Sport and the Olympics	Hugh Robertson	2010–2012
Parliamentary Under-Secretary of State for Culture, Communications and Creative Industries (jointly with Business)	Ed Vaizey	2010–2014
Minister of State for Culture and Digital Industries (jointly with Business)	Ed Vaizey	2014–2015
Parliamentary Under-Secretary for Women and Equalities (jointly with Government Equalities)	Helen Grant (jointly as Minister for the Courts and Victims)	2012–2013
Parliamentary Under-Secretary for Women and Equalities (jointly with Government Equalities)	Jo Swinson (jointly as Under-Secretary of State for Employment Relations, Consumer and Postal Affairs)	2012–2013
Parliamentary Under-Secretary for Women and Equalities (jointly with Government Equalities)	Jenny Willott (jointly as Under-Secretary of State for Employment Relations, Consumer and Postal Affairs and Assistant Whip)	Dec 2013 – June 2014 (Maternity Cover)

Defence
Post	Minister	Term
**Secretary of State for Defence**	Liam Fox	2010–2011
**Secretary of State for Defence**	Philip Hammond	2011–2014
**Secretary of State for Defence**	**Michael Fallon**	2014–2015
Minister of State for the Armed Forces	Nick Harvey	2010–2012
Minister of State for the Armed Forces	Andrew Robathan	2012–2013
Minister of State for the Armed Forces	Mark Francois	2013–2015
Minister for International Security Strategy	Gerald Howarth	2010–2012
Minister for International Security Strategy	Andrew Murrison	2012–2014
Minister for International Security Strategy	Anna Soubry	2014–2015
Parliamentary Under-Secretary of State for Defence Personnel, Welfare and Veterans	Andrew Robathan	2010–2012
Parliamentary Under-Secretary of State for Defence Personnel, Welfare and Veterans	Mark Francois	2012–2013
Parliamentary Under-Secretary of State for Defence Personnel, Welfare and Veterans	Anna Soubry	2013–2014
Parliamentary Under-Secretary of State for Defence Personnel, Welfare and Veterans	Julian Brazier	2014–2015
Minister for Defence Equipment, Support and Technology	Peter Luff	2010–2012
Minister for Defence Equipment, Support and Technology	Philip Dunne	2012–2015
Parliamentary Under-Secretary of State (also with Whips Office)	John Astor, 3rd Baron Astor of Hever	2010–2015

Education
**Secretary of State for Education**	Michael Gove	2010–2014
**Secretary of State for Education**	**Nicky Morgan** (jointly as Minister for Women and Equalities)	2014–2015
**Minister of State for Schools**	Nick Gibb	2010–2012
**Minister of State for Schools**	**David Laws**	2012–2015
Minister of State for School Reform	Nick Gibb	2014–2015
Minister of State for Further Education, Skills and Lifelong Learning (jointly with Business)	John Hayes	2010–2012
Parliamentary Under-Secretary of State for Skills (jointly with Business)	Matt Hancock	2012–2013
Minister of State for Skills and Enterprise (jointly with Business)	Matt Hancock	2013–2014
Minister of State for Skills and Equalities (jointly with Business)	Nick Boles	2014–2015
Minister of State for Children and Families	Sarah Teather	2010–2012
Parliamentary Under-Secretary of State for Children and Families	Tim Loughton	2010–2012
Parliamentary Under-Secretary of State for Children and Families	Edward Timpson	2012–2015
Parliamentary Under-Secretary of State for Education and Childcare	Liz Truss	2012–2014
Parliamentary Under-Secretary of State for Education and Childcare	Sam Gyimah	2014–2015
Parliamentary Under-Secretary for Women and Equalities (jointly with Government Equalities)	Jo Swinson (jointly as Under-Secretary of State for Employment Relations, Consumer and Postal Affairs)	2014–2015
Parliamentary Under-Secretary of State for Schools (unpaid)	Jonathan Hill, Baron Hill of Oareford	2010–2013
Parliamentary Under-Secretary of State for Schools (unpaid)	John Nash, Baron Nash	2013–2015

Energy and Climate Change
**Secretary of State for Energy and Climate Change**	Chris Huhne	2010–2012
**Secretary of State for Energy and Climate Change**	**Ed Davey**	2012–2015
Minister of State for Climate Change	Greg Barker	2010–2014
Minister of State for Climate Change	Amber Rudd	2014–2015
**Minister of State for Energy**	Charles Hendry	2010–2012
**Minister of State for Energy**	John Hayes	2012–2013
**Minister of State for Energy**	Michael Fallon	2013–2014
**Minister of State for Energy**	**Matthew Hancock** (also with Business)	2014–2015
Parliamentary Under-Secretary of State	Jonathan Marland, Baron Marland	2010–2012
Parliamentary Under-Secretary of State	Sandip Verma, Baroness Verma	2012–2015

Environment, Food and Rural Affairs
**Secretary of State for Environment, Food and Rural Affairs**	Caroline Spelman	2010–2012
**Secretary of State for Environment, Food and Rural Affairs**	Owen Paterson	2012–2014
**Secretary of State for Environment, Food and Rural Affairs**	**Liz Truss**	2014–2015
Minister of State for Agriculture and Food	James Paice	2010–2012
Minister of State for Agriculture and Food	David Heath	2012–2013
Parliamentary Under-Secretary of State for Natural Environment, Water and Rural Affairs	Richard Benyon	2010–2013
Parliamentary Under-Secretary of State for Farming, Food and Marine Environment	George Eustice	2013–2015
Parliamentary Under-Secretary of State for Water, Forestry, Rural Affairs and Resource Management	Dan Rogerson	2013–2015
Parliamentary Under-Secretary of State for Resource Management, the Local Environment and Environmental Science	Oliver Eden, 8th Baron Henley	2010–2011
Parliamentary Under-Secretary of State for Resource Management, the Local Environment and Environmental Science	John Taylor, Baron Taylor of Holbeach	2011–2012
Parliamentary Under-Secretary of State for Resource Management, the Local Environment and Environmental Science	Rupert Ponsonby, 7th Baron de Mauley	2012–2013
Parliamentary Under-Secretary of State for Natural Environment and Science	Rupert Ponsonby, 7th Baron de Mauley	2013–2015

Foreign and Commonwealth Office
**Foreign Secretary**; **First Secretary of State**	William Hague	2010–2014
**Foreign Secretary**	**Philip Hammond**	2014–2015
**Senior Minister of State for Foreign and Commonwealth Affairs**	Sayeeda Warsi, Baroness Warsi PC (also Minister of State for Faith and Communities)	2012–2014
**Minister of State for Foreign and Commonwealth Affairs**	**Joyce Anelay, Baroness Anelay of St John's**	2014–2015
Minister of State for Foreign and Commonwealth Affairs	Jeremy Browne	2010–2012
Minister of State for Foreign and Commonwealth Affairs	Hugo Swire	2012–2015
Minister of State for Europe	David Lidington	2010–2015
Minister of State for Foreign and Commonwealth Affairs	Hugh Robertson	2013–2014
Minister of State for Foreign and Commonwealth Affairs	Tobias Ellwood	2014–2015
Minister of State (unpaid)	David Howell, Baron Howell of Guildford	2010–2012
Minister of State for Trade and Investment (jointly with Business) (unpaid)	Stephen Green, Baron Green of Hurstpierpoint	2011–2013
Minister of State for Trade and Investment (jointly with Business) (unpaid)	Ian Livingston, Baron Livingston of Parkhead	2013–2015
Parliamentary Under-Secretaries of State	Alistair Burt	2010–2013
Parliamentary Under-Secretaries of State	James Duddridge	2014–2015
Parliamentary Under-Secretaries of State	Henry Bellingham	2010–2012
Parliamentary Under-Secretaries of State	Mark Simmonds	2012–2014

Government Equalities Office
**Minister for Women and Equalities**	Theresa May (also Home Secretary)	2010–2012
**Minister for Women and Equalities**	Maria Miller (also Secretary of State for Culture, Media and Sport)	2012–2014
**Minister for Women and Equalities**	**Nicky Morgan** (also Secretary of State for Education)	2014–2015
**Minister for Equalities**	Sajid Javid (also Secretary of State for Culture, Media and Sport)	2014
**Minister for Women**	Nicky Morgan (also Financial Secretary to the Treasury)	2014
Parliamentary Under-Secretary of State for Equalities (jointly with Home Office)	Lynne Featherstone	2010–2012
Parliamentary Under-Secretary of State for Equalities (jointly with Culture)	Helen Grant (jointly as Minister for the Courts and Victims)	2012–2013
Parliamentary Under-Secretary of State for Equalities (jointly with Culture)	Helen Grant (jointly as Minister for Sport, Tourism and Equality)	2013–2014
Parliamentary Under-Secretary of State for Equalities	Helen Grant	2014–2015
Parliamentary Under-Secretary for Women and Equalities (jointly with Culture)	Jo Swinson (jointly as Under-Secretary of State for Employment Relations, Consumer and Postal Affairs)	2012–2013
Parliamentary Under-Secretary for Women and Equalities (jointly with Culture)	Jenny Willott (jointly as Under-Secretary of State for Employment Relations, Consumer and Postal Affairs and Assistant Whip)	Dec 2013 – June 2014 (Maternity Cover)
Parliamentary Under-Secretary for Women and Equalities (jointly with Education)	Jo Swinson (jointly as Under-Secretary of State for Employment Relations, Consumer and Postal Affairs)	2014–2015

Health
**Secretary of State for Health**	Andrew Lansley	2010–2012
**Secretary of State for Health**	**Jeremy Hunt**	2012–2015
Minister of State for Care and Support	Paul Burstow	2010–2012
Minister of State for Care and Support	Norman Lamb	2012–2015
Minister of State for Health Services	Simon Burns	2010–2012
Parliamentary Under-Secretary of State for Health Services	Dr Dan Poulter	2012–2015
Parliamentary Under-Secretary of State for Public Health	Anne Milton	2010–2012
Parliamentary Under-Secretary of State for Public Health	Anna Soubry	2012–2013
Parliamentary Under-Secretary of State for Public Health	Jane Ellison	2013–2015
Parliamentary Under-Secretary of State for Quality	Frederick Curzon, 7th Earl Howe	2010–2015
Parliamentary Under-Secretary of State for Life Sciences (jointly with Business)	George Freeman	2014–2015

Home Office
**Home Secretary**	'Theresa May (jointly as Minister for Women and Equalities 2010–2012)	2010–2015
Minister of State for Crime Prevention	Jeremy Browne	2012–2013
Minister of State for Crime Prevention	Norman Baker	2013–2014
Minister of State for Crime Prevention	Lynne Featherstone	2014–2015
Minister of State for Immigration	**Damian Green**	2010–2012
Minister of State for Immigration	Mark Harper	2012–2014
Minister of State for Immigration and Security	James Brokenshire	2014–2015
Minister of State for Policing, Criminal Justice and Victims (jointly with Justice)	Nick Herbert	2010–2012
Minister of State for Policing, Criminal Justice and Victims (jointly with Justice)	Damian Green	2012–2014
Minister of State for Policing, Criminal Justice and Victims (jointly with Justice)	Mike Penning	2014–2015
Minister of State for Security and Counter-Terrorism	Pauline Neville-Jones, Baroness Neville-Jones	2010–2011
Minister of State for Crime Prevention and Antisocial Behaviour Reduction	Angela Browning, Baroness Browning	2011
Minister of State for Crime Prevention and Antisocial Behaviour Reduction	Oliver Eden, 8th Baron Henley	2011–2012
Parliamentary Under-Secretary of State for Criminal Information Parliamentary Under-Secretary for Equalities (jointly with Government Equalities)	Lynne Featherstone	2010–2012
Parliamentary Under-Secretary of State for Crime Reduction	James Brokenshire	2010–2011
Parliamentary Under-Secretary of State for Crime and Security	James Brokenshire	2011–2014
Minister for Modern Slavery and Organised Crime	Karen Bradley	2014–2015
Parliamentary Under Secretary of State for Criminal Information	John Taylor, Baron Taylor of Holbeach	2012–2014
Parliamentary Under Secretary of State for Criminal Information	Michael Bates, Baron Bates	2014–2015

International Development
**Secretary of State for International Development**	Andrew Mitchell	2010–2012
**Secretary of State for International Development**	**Justine Greening**	2012–2015
Minister of State for International Development	Alan Duncan	2010–2014
Minister of State for International Development	Desmond Swayne	2014–2015
Parliamentary Under-Secretary of State	Stephen O'Brien	2010–2012
Parliamentary Under-Secretary of State	Lynne Featherstone	2012–2014
Parliamentary Under-Secretary of State	Lindsay Northover, Baroness Northover	2014–2015

Justice
**Lord High Chancellor of Great Britain**; **Secretary of State for Justice**	Kenneth Clarke	2010–2012
**Lord High Chancellor of Great Britain**; **Secretary of State for Justice**	**Chris Grayling**	2012–2015
Minister of State for Police, Criminal Justice and Victims (jointly with Home Office)	Nick Herbert	2010–2012
Minister of State for Police, Criminal Justice and Victims (jointly with Home Office)	Damian Green	2012–2014
Minister of State for Police, Criminal Justice and Victims (jointly with Home Office)	Mike Penning	2014–2015
Minister of State (also Deputy Leader of the Lords)	Tom McNally, Baron McNally	2010–2013
Minister of State for Justice and Civil Liberties	Simon Hughes	2013–2015
Minister of State for Civil Justice and Legal Policy	Edward Faulks, Baron Faulks (unpaid)	2014–2015
Parliamentary Under-Secretary of State for the Courts and Legal Aid	Jonathan Djanogly	2010–2012
Parliamentary Under-Secretary of State for the Courts and Victims	Helen Grant (jointly as Under-Secretary of State for Equalities)	2012–2013
Parliamentary Under-Secretary of State for the Courts and Legal Aid	Shailesh Vara	2013–2015
Parliamentary Under-Secretary of State for Prisons, Probation and Rehabilitation	Crispin Blunt	2010–2012
Parliamentary Under-Secretary of State for Prisons, Probation and Rehabilitation	Jeremy Wright	2012–2014
Parliamentary Under-Secretary of State for Prisons, Probation and Rehabilitation	Andrew Selous (jointly as Assistant Whip)	2014–2015

Northern Ireland
**Secretary of State for Northern Ireland**	Owen Paterson	2010–2012
**Secretary of State for Northern Ireland**	**Theresa Villiers**	2012–2015
Minister of State for Northern Ireland	Hugo Swire	2010–2012
Minister of State for Northern Ireland	Mike Penning	2012–2013
Minister of State for Northern Ireland	Andrew Robathan	2013–2014
Minister of State for Northern Ireland	Andrew Murrison	2014–2015

Scotland
**Secretary of State for Scotland**	Danny Alexander	2010
**Secretary of State for Scotland**	Michael Moore	2010–2013
**Secretary of State for Scotland**	'Alistair Carmichael	2013–2015
Parliamentary Under-Secretary of State	David Mundell	2010–2015

Transport
**Secretary of State for Transport**	Philip Hammond	2010–2011
**Secretary of State for Transport**	Justine Greening	2011–2012
**Secretary of State for Transport**	**Patrick McLoughlin**	2012–2015
Minister of State for Transport	Theresa Villiers	2010–2012
Minister of State for Transport	Simon Burns	2012–2013
Minister of State for Transport	Susan Kramer, Baroness Kramer	2013–2015
Minister of State for Transport	John Hayes	2014–2015
Parliamentary Under-secretary of State	Norman Baker	2010–2013
Parliamentary Under-secretary of State	Robert Goodwill	2013–2015
Parliamentary Under-secretary of State	Mike Penning	2010–2012
Parliamentary Under-secretary of State	Stephen Hammond	2012–2014
Parliamentary Under-secretary of State	Claire Perry	2014–2015

Treasury
**Chancellor of the Exchequer**	**George Osborne**	2010–2015
**Chief Secretary to the Treasury** (also in Cabinet Office)	David Laws	2010
**Chief Secretary to the Treasury** (also in Cabinet Office)	**Danny Alexander**	2010–2015
Financial Secretary to the Treasury (Also City Minister to 2014)	Mark Hoban (City Minister)	2010–2012
Financial Secretary to the Treasury (Also City Minister to 2014)	Greg Clark (City Minister) Also Minister for Cities	2012–2013
Financial Secretary to the Treasury (Also City Minister to 2014)	Sajid Javid (City Minister)	2013–2014
Financial Secretary to the Treasury (Also City Minister to 2014)	Nicky Morgan (also Minister for Women Apr–Jul 2014)	2014
Financial Secretary to the Treasury (Also City Minister to 2014)	David Gauke	2014–2015
Economic Secretary to the Treasury (City Minister from 2014)	Justine Greening	2010–2011
Economic Secretary to the Treasury (City Minister from 2014)	Chloe Smith	2011–2012
Economic Secretary to the Treasury (City Minister from 2014)	Sajid Javid	2012–2013
Economic Secretary to the Treasury (City Minister from 2014)	Nicky Morgan	2013–2014
Economic Secretary to the Treasury (City Minister from 2014)	Andrea Leadsom (City Minister)	2014–2015
Exchequer Secretary to the Treasury	David Gauke	2010–2014
Exchequer Secretary to the Treasury	Priti Patel	2014–2015
Commercial Secretary to the Treasury (unpaid)	James Sassoon, Baron Sassoon	2010–2013
Commercial Secretary to the Treasury (unpaid)	Paul Deighton, Baron Deighton	2013–2015

Wales
**Secretary of State for Wales**	Cheryl Gillan	2010–2012
**Secretary of State for Wales**	David Jones	2012–2014
**Secretary of State for Wales**	**Stephen Crabb**	2014–2015
Parliamentary Under-Secretary of State for Wales	David Jones	2010–2012
Parliamentary Under-Secretary of State for Wales	Stephen Crabb (Jointly as paid Lord Commissioner of the Treasury)	2012–2014
Parliamentary Under-Secretary of State for Wales	Alun Cairns (Jointly as paid Lord Commissioner of the Treasury)	2014–2015
Parliamentary Under-Secretary of State for Wales (unpaid)	Jenny Randerson, Baroness Randerson	2012–2015

Work and Pensions
**Secretary of State for Work and Pensions**	**Iain Duncan Smith**	2010–2015
**Minister of State for Employment**	Chris Grayling	2010–2012
**Minister of State for Employment**	Mark Hoban	2012–2013
**Minister of State for Employment**	**Esther McVey**	2013–2015
Minister of State for Pensions	Steve Webb	2010–2015
Parliamentary Under-Secretary of State for Disabled People	Maria Miller	2010–2012
Parliamentary Under-Secretary of State for Disabled People	Esther McVey	2012–2013
Minister of State for Disabled People	Mike Penning	2013–2014
Minister of State for Disabled People	Mark Harper	2014–2015
Parliamentary Under-Secretary of State for Welfare Reform (unpaid)	David Freud, Baron Freud	2010–2015

=== Law officers ===
Attorney General's Office
**Attorney General** (attends Cabinet when responsibilities are on the agenda); **Advocate General for Northern Ireland**	Dominic Grieve	2010–2014
**Attorney General** (attends Cabinet when responsibilities are on the agenda); **Advocate General for Northern Ireland**	**Jeremy Wright**	2014–2015
Solicitor General	Edward Garnier	2010–2012
Solicitor General	Oliver Heald	2012–2014
Solicitor General	Robert Buckland	2014–2015

Office of the Advocate General for Scotland
Advocate General for Scotland	Jim Wallace, Baron Wallace of Tankerness (also Deputy Leader of the Lords)	2010–2015

=== Parliament ===
House Leaders
**Leader of the House of Commons**; **Lord Keeper of the Privy Seal**	Sir George Young, 6th Baronet	2010–2012
**Leader of the House of Commons**; **Lord Keeper of the Privy Seal**	Andrew Lansley	2012–2014
**Leader of the House of Commons**; **First Secretary of State**	**William Hague**	2014–2015
Deputy Leader of the House of Commons	David Heath	2010–2012
Deputy Leader of the House of Commons	Tom Brake (also an Assistant Whip 2014–2015)	2012–2015
**Leader of the House of Lords**; **Chancellor of the Duchy of Lancaster**	Thomas Galbraith, 2nd Baron Strathclyde	2010–2013
**Leader of the House of Lords**; **Chancellor of the Duchy of Lancaster**	Jonathan Hill, Baron Hill of Oareford	2013–2014
**Leader of the House of Lords**; **Lord Keeper of the Privy Seal**	**Tina Stowell, Baroness Stowell of Beeston**	2014–2015
Deputy Leader of the House of Lords	Tom McNally, Baron McNally (also with Justice)	2010–2013
Deputy Leader of the House of Lords	Jim Wallace, Baron Wallace of Tankerness (also Advocate General for Scotland)	2013–2015

Whips
**Chief Whip of the House of Commons**; **Parliamentary Secretary to the Treasury**	Patrick McLoughlin	2010–2012
**Chief Whip of the House of Commons**; **Parliamentary Secretary to the Treasury**	Andrew Mitchell	2012
**Chief Whip of the House of Commons**; **Parliamentary Secretary to the Treasury**	Sir George Young, 6th Baronet	2012–2014
**Chief Whip of the House of Commons**; **Parliamentary Secretary to the Treasury**	**Michael Gove**	2014–2015
Deputy Chief Whip of the House of Commons; Treasurer of the Household	John Randall	2010–2013
Deputy Chief Whip of the House of Commons; Treasurer of the Household	Greg Hands	2013–2015
Deputy Chief Whip of the House of Commons; Comptroller of the Household; Liberal Democrat Chief Whip	Alistair Carmichael	2010–2013
Deputy Chief Whip of the House of Commons; Comptroller of the Household; Liberal Democrat Chief Whip	Don Foster	2013–2015
Whip; Vice-Chamberlain of the Household	Mark Francois	2010–2012
Whip; Vice-Chamberlain of the Household	Greg Knight	2012–2013
Whip; Vice-Chamberlain of the Household	Desmond Swayne	2013–2014
Whip; Vice-Chamberlain of the Household	Anne Milton	2014–2015
Whips; Lords of the Treasury	Michael Fabricant	2010–2012
Whips; Lords of the Treasury	Desmond Swayne	2012–2013
Whips; Lords of the Treasury	Sam Gyimah	2013–2014
Whips; Lords of the Treasury	Angela Watkinson	2010–2012
Whips; Lords of the Treasury	Anne Milton	2012–2014
Whips; Lords of the Treasury	Jeremy Wright	2010–2012
Whips; Lords of the Treasury	Mark Lancaster	2012–2015
Whips; Lords of the Treasury	Brooks Newmark (unpaid)	2010–2012
Whips; Lords of the Treasury	David Evennett	2012–2015
Whips; Lords of the Treasury	James Duddridge	2010–2012
Whips; Lords of the Treasury	Robert Goodwill	2012–2013
Whips; Lords of the Treasury	Karen Bradley	2013–2014
Whips; Lords of the Treasury	Stephen Crabb (Jointly as unpaid Under-Secretary of State for Wales)	2012–2014
Whips; Lords of the Treasury	John Penrose	2014–2015
Whips; Lords of the Treasury	Gavin Barwell	2014–2015
Whips; Lords of the Treasury	Harriett Baldwin	2014–2015
Whips; Lords of the Treasury	Alun Cairns (jointly as unpaid Under-Secretary of State for Wales)	2014–2015
Assistant Whips	Philip Dunne (unpaid)	2010–2012
Assistant Whips	Karen Bradley	2012–2013
Assistant Whips	John Penrose	2013–2014
Assistant Whips	Harriett Baldwin	2014
Assistant Whips	Stephen Crabb	2010–2012
Assistant Whips	Jo Johnson	2012–2014
Assistant Whips	Robert Goodwill	2010–2012
Assistant Whips	Nicky Morgan	2012–2013
Assistant Whips	Amber Rudd	2013–2014
Assistant Whips	Shailesh Vara	2010–2012
Assistant Whips	Robert Syms	2012–2013
Assistant Whips	Claire Perry	2013–2014
Assistant Whips	Bill Wiggin	2010–2012
Assistant Whips	Chloe Smith	2010–2011
Assistant Whips	Greg Hands	2011–2013
Assistant Whips	Gavin Barwell	2013–2014
Assistant Whips	Andrew Selous (jointly as Minister for Prisons, Probation and Rehabilitation)	2014–2015
Assistant Whips	Thérèse Coffey	2014–2015
Assistant Whips	Mel Stride	2014–2015
Assistant Whips	Ben Wallace	2014–2015
Assistant Whips	Damian Hinds	2014–2015
Assistant Whips	Mark Hunter	2010–2014
Assistant Whips	Tom Brake (also Deputy Leader of the House of Commons)	2014–2015
Assistant Whips	Norman Lamb (jointly with Deputy PM's office)	2010–2012
Assistant Whips	Jenny Willott	2012–2014
Assistant Whips	Lorely Burt	2014–2015
Chief Whip of the House of Lords; Captain of the Honourable Corps of Gentlemen-at-Arms	Joyce Anelay, Baroness Anelay of St John's	2010–2014
Chief Whip of the House of Lords; Captain of the Honourable Corps of Gentlemen-at-Arms	John Taylor, Baron Taylor of Holbeach	2014–2015
Deputy Chief Whip of the House of Lords; Captain of the Queen's Bodyguard of the Yeomen of the Guard	David Shutt, Baron Shutt of Greetland	2010–2012
Deputy Chief Whip of the House of Lords; Captain of the Queen's Bodyguard of the Yeomen of the Guard	Richard Newby, Baron Newby	2012–2015
Whips; Lords and Baronesses in Waiting	John Attlee, 3rd Earl Attlee	2010–2014
Whips; Lords and Baronesses in Waiting	John Astor, 3rd Baron Astor of Hever (also with Defence)	2010–2011
Whips; Lords and Baronesses in Waiting	James Younger, 5th Viscount Younger of Leckie	2012–2013
Whips; Lords and Baronesses in Waiting	Rupert Ponsonby, 7th Baron de Mauley	2010–2012
Whips; Lords and Baronesses in Waiting	Lindsay Northover, Baroness Northover (unpaid)	2010–2014
Whips; Lords and Baronesses in Waiting	Patricia Rawlings, Baroness Rawlings	2010–2012
Whips; Lords and Baronesses in Waiting	John Taylor, Baron Taylor of Holbeach (unpaid)	2010–2011
Whips; Lords and Baronesses in Waiting	Sandip Verma, Baroness Verma	2010–2012
Whips; Lords and Baronesses in Waiting	William Wallace, Baron Wallace of Saltaire (unpaid)	2010–2015
Whips; Lords and Baronesses in Waiting	Susan Garden, Baroness Garden of Frognal (unpaid)	2010–2013 2014–2015
Whips; Lords and Baronesses in Waiting	Tina Stowell, Baroness Stowell of Beeston	2011–2013
Whips; Lords and Baronesses in Waiting	John Gardiner, Baron Gardiner of Kimble	2012–2015
Whips; Lords and Baronesses in Waiting	Tariq Ahmad, Baron Ahmad of Wimbledon	2012–2014
Whips; Lords and Baronesses in Waiting	Dolar Popat, Baron Popat	2013–2015
Whips; Lords and Baronesses in Waiting	Michael Bates, Baron Bates	2013–2014
Whips; Lords and Baronesses in Waiting	Judith Jolly, Baroness Jolly (unpaid)	2013–2015
Whips; Lords and Baronesses in Waiting	Susan Williams, Baroness Williams of Trafford	2014–2015
Whips; Lords and Baronesses in Waiting	Henry Ashton, 4th Baron Ashton of Hyde	2014–2015
Whips; Lords and Baronesses in Waiting	Nick Bourne, Baron Bourne of Aberystwyth	2014–2015

== See also ==
- Fox–North coalition
- Theresa May as Home Secretary
- Premiership of David Cameron
- Lib–Con pact
- Lib–Lab pact
- List of acts of the Parliament of the United Kingdom
- Miliband shadow cabinet

== Bibliography ==
- Adonis, Andrew (2013). "Cameron–Clegg: Three Years On". 5 Days in May: The Coalition and Beyond (first ed.). Biteback. ISBN 978-1-84954-605-8.
- Eccleston, Richard; Krever, Richard, eds. (2017). The Future of Federalism: Intergovernmental Financial Relations in an Age of Austerity. Edward Elgar. ISBN 978-1-78471-778-0.
- Hazell, Robert; Yong, Ben (2012). The Politics of Coalition: How the Conservative–Liberal Democrat Government Works. Hart. ISBN 978-1-84946-310-2.
- Jowell, Jeffrey; Oliver, Dawn; O'Cinneide, Colm, eds. (2015). The Changing Constitution (eighth ed.). Oxford University Press. ISBN 978-0-19-870982-4.
- Kickert, Walter; Randma-Liiv, Tiina (2015). Europe Managing the Crisis: The Politics of Fiscal Consolidation. Routledge. ISBN 978-1-317-52570-7.
- Peele, Gillian; Francis, John G., eds. (2016). David Cameron and Conservative Renewal: The Limits of Modernisation?. Manchester University Press. ISBN 978-1-78499-153-1.

Preceded by Brown ministry	Government of the United Kingdom; 2010–2015	Succeeded by Second Cameron ministry
