= First May ministry =

Government of the United Kingdom from 2016 to 2017

- Cabinet of the United Kingdom
- 2016–2017
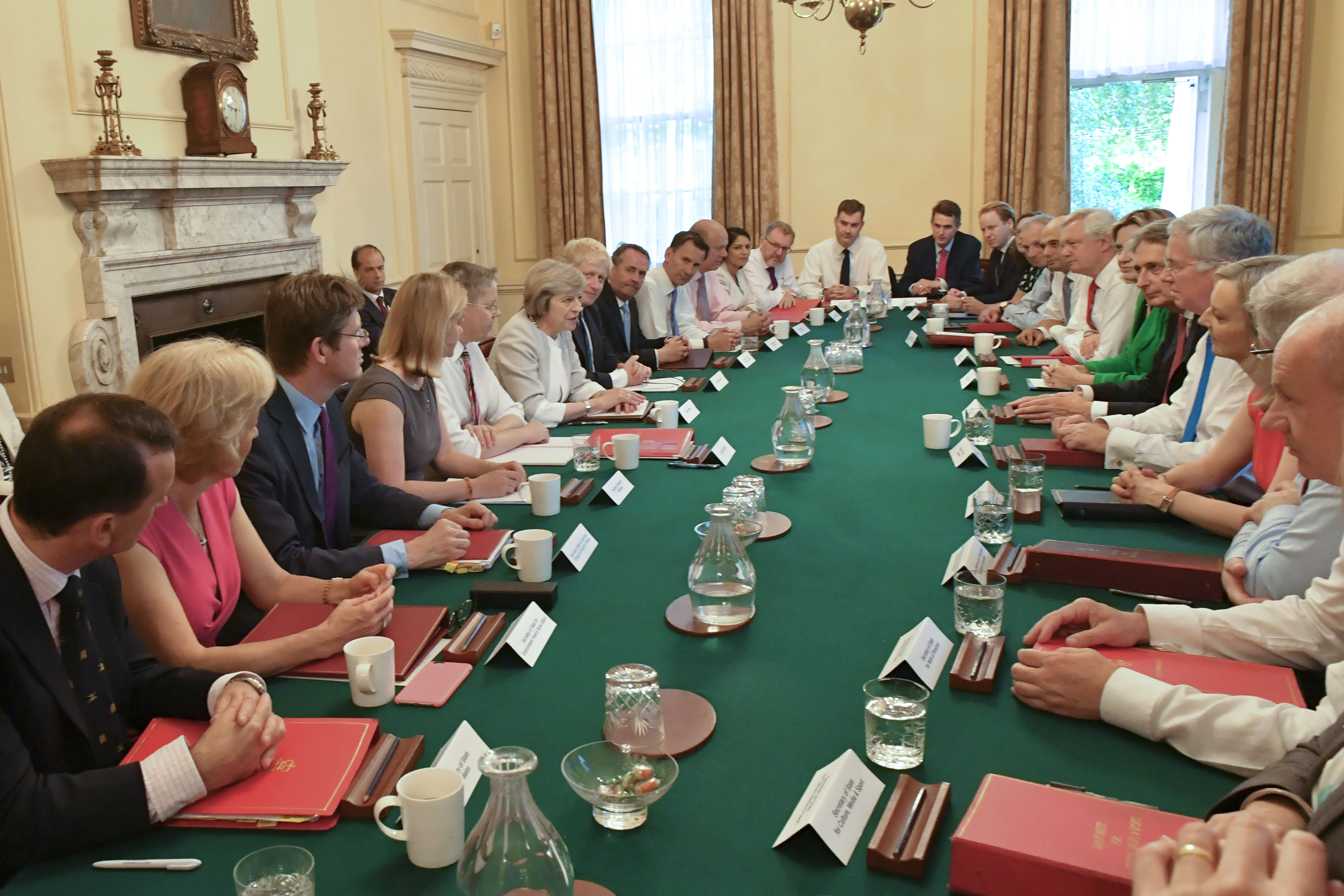
- May holding her first cabinet meeting
- Date formed: 13 July 2016
- Date dissolved: 11 June 2017

People and organisations
- Monarch: Elizabeth II
- Prime Minister: Theresa May
- Prime Minister's history: Premiership of Theresa May
- Member party: Conservative Party
- Status in legislature: Majority (2016–2017); Caretaker (June 2017)
- Opposition cabinet: Corbyn shadow cabinet
- Opposition party: Labour Party
- Opposition leader: Jeremy Corbyn

History
- Incoming formation: 2016 Conservative leadership election
- Outgoing formation: 2017 United Kingdom government formation
- Outgoing election: 2017 general election
- Legislature terms: 2015–2017 (Note: Although the 56th Parliament was due to last until 2020, May successfully sought the backing of Parliament for a snap election on 19 April 2017.)
- Budget: March 2017 budget
- Predecessor: Second Cameron ministry
- Successor: Second May ministry

Theresa May formed the first May ministry in the United Kingdom on 13 July 2016, after having been invited by Queen Elizabeth II to form a new government. Then the Home Secretary, May's appointment followed the resignation of then Prime Minister David Cameron. The ministry, a Conservative majority government, succeeded the second Cameron ministry which had been formed following the 2015 general election. Cameron's government was dissolved as a result of his resignation in the immediate aftermath of the June 2016 referendum on British withdrawal from the European Union.

After the 2017 snap general election resulted in a hung parliament, May formed a new minority government with support from the Democratic Unionist Party.

== History ==
May announced her choices for Chancellor of the Exchequer, Home Secretary, Foreign Secretary and Defence Secretary in the evening of 13 July: Philip Hammond, Amber Rudd, and Boris Johnson were respectively appointed to the first three posts, while Michael Fallon continued as Defence Secretary. David Davis was appointed to the new post of Secretary of State for Exiting the European Union, while Liam Fox became Secretary of State for International Trade and President of the Board of Trade. Greg Clark, who was made business secretary, was mistakenly appointed as President of the Board of Trade by the Privy Council, and held the appointment for four days before the mistake was corrected.

May's choices for the remaining cabinet posts were announced on 14 July. Justine Greening, previously international development secretary, was promoted to education secretary, and the vacancy left by Greening was filled by Priti Patel. Liz Truss, formerly environment secretary, was given the justice portfolio. Andrea Leadsom, previously a junior energy minister, and also the final opponent of Theresa May in the 2016 Conservative leadership election, was made environment secretary. James Brokenshire and Karen Bradley, both formerly junior ministers at the Home Office, were given the posts of Northern Ireland and culture, media and sport respectively. Damian Green took the post of work and pensions secretary, and Chris Grayling was made transport secretary. Finally, Sajid Javid was given the communities and local government brief, The Baroness Evans of Bowes Park became Lords Leader and David Lidington became Commons Leader.

Jeremy Hunt, Alun Cairns, and David Mundell retained the posts of health secretary, Welsh secretary, and Scottish secretary, respectively, which they had held during the second Cameron ministry. In contrast, May sacked six ministers from Cameron's Cabinet: Chancellor of the Exchequer George Osborne, Justice Secretary Michael Gove, Culture Secretary John Whittingdale, Education Secretary Nicky Morgan, Chancellor of the Duchy of Lancaster Oliver Letwin and Leader of the House of Lords Baroness Stowell of Beeston.

In addition, May appointed Fiona Hill and Nick Timothy as Downing Street Chiefs of Staff. Both had been political advisers to her at the Home Office, then worked outside government for a brief period before coming back to work on her leadership campaign.

== Cabinet ==
First May cabinet
| Portfolio | Portrait | Minister | Term |
|---|---|---|---|
Cabinet ministers
| Prime Minister; First Lord of the Treasury; Minister for the Civil Service | | Theresa May | 2016–2019 |
| Chancellor of the Exchequer; Second Lord of the Treasury | | Philip Hammond | 2016–2019 |
| Secretary of State for the Home Department | | Amber Rudd | 2016–2018 |
| Secretary of State for Foreign and Commonwealth Affairs | | Boris Johnson | 2016–2018 |
| Secretary of State for Defence | | Michael Fallon | 2014–2017 |
| Lord High Chancellor of Great Britain; Secretary of State for Justice | | Liz Truss | 2016–2017 |
| Secretary of State for Education; Minister for Women and Equalities | | Justine Greening | 2016–2018 |
| Secretary of State for Exiting the European Union | | David Davis | 2016–2018 |
| Secretary of State for International Trade; President of the Board of Trade | | Liam Fox | 2016–2019 |
| Secretary of State for Business, Energy and Industrial Strategy | | Greg Clark | 2016–2019 |
| Secretary of State for Health | | Jeremy Hunt | 2012–2018 |
| Secretary of State for Work and Pensions | | Damian Green | 2016–2017 |
| Leader of the House of Lords; Lord Keeper of the Privy Seal | | Natalie Evans; Baroness Evans of Bowes Park | 2016–2022 |
| Secretary of State for Transport | | Chris Grayling | 2016–2019 |
| Secretary of State for Communities and Local Government | | Sajid Javid | 2016–2018 |
| Leader of the House of Commons; Lord President of the Council | | David Lidington | 2016–2017 |
| Secretary of State for Scotland | | David Mundell | 2015–2019 |
| Secretary of State for Wales | | Alun Cairns | 2016–2019 |
| Secretary of State for Northern Ireland | | James Brokenshire | 2016–2018 |
| Secretary of State for Environment, Food and Rural Affairs | | Andrea Leadsom | 2016–2017 |
| Secretary of State for International Development | | Priti Patel | 2016–2017 |
| Secretary of State for Culture, Media and Sport | | Karen Bradley | 2016–2018 |
Also attending cabinet meetings
| Chief Secretary to the Treasury | | David Gauke | 2016–2017 |
| Minister for the Cabinet Office; Paymaster General | | Ben Gummer | 2016–2017 |
| Attorney General | | Jeremy Wright | 2014–2018 |
| Chief Whip in the House of Commons; Parliamentary Secretary to the Treasury | | Gavin Williamson | 2016–2017 |
| Chancellor of the Duchy of Lancaster; Chairman of the Conservative Party (Unpaid) | | Patrick McLoughlin | 2016–2018 |

== List of ministers ==
| Minister in the House of Commons | Minister in the House of Lords |
Ministers that attend cabinet are listed **in bold**

=== Prime Minister and the Cabinet Office ===
Prime Minister and Cabinet Office
| Post | Minister | Term |
|---|---|---|
| Prime Minister of the United Kingdom; First Lord of the Treasury; Minister for the Civil Service | **Theresa May** | July 2016–June 2017 |
| Parliamentary Private Secretary to the Prime Minister | George Hollingbery | July 2016–June 2017 |
| Chancellor of the Duchy of Lancaster; Chairman of the Conservative Party (unpaid) | **Sir Patrick McLoughlin** | July 2016–June 2017 |
| Minister for the Cabinet Office; Paymaster General | **Ben Gummer** | July 2016–June 2017 |
| Leader of the House of Commons; Lord President of the Council | **David Lidington** | July 2016–June 2017 |
| Parliamentary Secretary at the Cabinet Office; Minister for the Constitution | Chris Skidmore | July 2016–June 2017 |

=== Departments of state ===
Business, Energy and Industrial Strategy
| Secretary of State for Business, Energy and Industrial Strategy (President of the Board of Trade 15–19 July 2016) | **Greg Clark** | July 2016–June 2017 |
| Minister of State for Universities, Science, Research and Innovation | Jo Johnson (jointly with Education) | May 2015–June 2017 |
| Minister of State for Climate Change and Industry | Nick Hurd | July 2016–June 2017 |
| Minister of State for Energy and Intellectual Property | Lucy Neville-Rolfe, Baroness Neville-Rolfe | July 2016 – Dec 2016 |
| Parliamentary Under-Secretary of State for Energy and Intellectual Property | David Prior, Baron Prior of Brampton | Dec 2016–June 2017 |
| Parliamentary Under-Secretary of State; Minister for Small Business, Consumers and Corporate Responsibility | Margot James | July 2016–June 2017 |
| Parliamentary Under-Secretary of State; Minister for Industry and Energy | Jesse Norman | July 2016–June 2017 |

Communities and Local Government
| Secretary of State for Communities and Local Government | **Sajid Javid** | July 2016–June 2017 |
| Minister of State for Housing and Planning; Minister for London | Gavin Barwell | July 2016–June 2017 |
| Parliamentary Under-Secretary of State; Minister for Local Government | Marcus Jones | May 2015–June 2017 |
| Parliamentary Under-Secretary of State; Minister for the Northern Powerhouse | Andrew Percy | July 2016–June 2017 |
| Parliamentary Under-Secretary of State for Communities | Nick Bourne, Baron Bourne of Aberystwyth, (also with Wales) | July 2016–June 2017 |

Culture, Media and Sport
| Secretary of State for Culture, Media and Sport | **Karen Bradley** | July 2016–June 2017 |
| Minister of State for Digital and Culture | Matt Hancock | July 2016–June 2017 |
| Parliamentary Under-Secretary of State for Sport, Heritage, and Tourism | Tracey Crouch | May 2015–June 2017 |
| Parliamentary Under-Secretary of State for Civil Society | Rob Wilson | July 2016–June 2017 |
| Parliamentary Under-Secretary of State | Henry Ashton, 4th Baron Ashton of Hyde (also Lord-in-Waiting) | July 2016–June 2017 |
| Parliamentary Under-Secretary of State; Minister for Internet Safety and Security | Joanna Shields, Baroness Shields (with Home Office until Dec 2016) (unpaid) | May 2015 – Dec 2016 |

Defence
| Secretary of State for Defence | **Sir Michael Fallon** | July 2014–June 2017 |
| Minister of State for the Armed Forces | Mike Penning | July 2016–June 2017 |
| Minister of State for Defence | Frederick Curzon, 7th Earl Howe (also Deputy Lords Leader) (unpaid) | May 2015–June 2017 |
| Parliamentary Under-Secretary of State for Defence Procurement | Harriett Baldwin | July 2016–June 2017 |
| Parliamentary Under-Secretary of State for Defence Veterans, Reserves and Personnel | Mark Lancaster | May 2015–June 2017 |

Education and Equalities
| Secretary of State for Education; Minister for Women and Equalities | **Justine Greening** | July 2016–June 2017 |
| Minister of State for Apprenticeships and Skills | Robert Halfon | July 2016–June 2017 |
| Minister of State for Universities, Science, Research and Innovation | Jo Johnson (jointly with BEIS) | July 2016–June 2017 |
| Minister of State for School Standards | Nick Gibb | July 2014–June 2017 |
| Minister of State for Vulnerable Children and Families | Edward Timpson | May 2015–June 2017 |
| Parliamentary Under-Secretary of State for Women, Equalities and Early Years | Caroline Dinenage | May 2015–June 2017 |
| Parliamentary Under-Secretary of State for the School System | John Nash, Baron Nash (unpaid) | Oct 2013–June 2017 |

Environment, Food and Rural Affairs
| Secretary of State for Environment, Food and Rural Affairs | **Andrea Leadsom** | July 2016–June 2017 |
| Minister of State for Agriculture, Fisheries and Food | George Eustice | October 2013–June 2017 |
| Parliamentary Under-Secretary of State for the Environment and Rural Life Opportunities | Thérèse Coffey | July 2016–June 2017 |
| Parliamentary Under-Secretary of State for Rural Affairs and Biosecurity | John Gardiner, Baron Gardiner of Kimble | July 2016–June 2017 |

Exiting the European Union
| Secretary of State for Exiting the European Union | **David Davis** | July 2016–June 2017 |
| Minister of State | David Jones | July 2016–June 2017 |
| Parliamentary Under-Secretary of State | Robin Walker | July 2016–June 2017 |
| Parliamentary Under-Secretary of State | George Bridges, Baron Bridges of Headley | July 2016–June 2017 |

Foreign and Commonwealth Affairs
| Secretary of State for Foreign and Commonwealth Affairs | **Boris Johnson** | July 2016–June 2017 |
| Minister of State for Europe and the Americas | Sir Alan Duncan | July 2016–June 2017 |
| Minister of State for the Commonwealth and the UN | Joyce Anelay, Baroness Anelay of St John's (with International Development until October 2016) | July 2016–June 2017 |
| Parliamentary Under-Secretary of State; Minister for Asia and the Pacific | Alok Sharma | July 2016–June 2017 |
| Parliamentary Under-Secretary of State; Minister for the Middle East and Africa | Tobias Ellwood | July 2016–June 2017 |

Government Equalities Office
| Minister for Women and Equalities (Jointly with Education) | **Justine Greening** | July 2016-June 2017 |
| Parliamentary Under-Secretary of State for Women, Equalities and Early Years (Jointly with Education) | Caroline Dinenage | May 2015-June 2017 |

Health
| Secretary of State for Health | **Jeremy Hunt** | September 2012–June 2017 |
| Minister of State for Health | Philip Dunne | July 2016–June 2017 |
| Parliamentary Under-Secretary of State for Public Health and Innovation | Nicola Blackwood | July 2016–June 2017 |
| Parliamentary Under-Secretary of State for Community Health and Care | David Mowat | July 2016–June 2017 |
| Parliamentary Under-Secretary of State | David Prior, Baron Prior of Brampton | May 2015 – Dec 2016 |
| Parliamentary Under-Secretary of State | James O'Shaughnessy, Baron O'Shaughnessy (also a whip) | Dec 2016–June 2017 |

Home Office
| Secretary of State for the Home Department | **Amber Rudd** | July 2016–June 2017 |
| Minister of State for Security | Ben Wallace | July 2016–June 2017 |
| Minister of State for Policing and the Fire Services | Brandon Lewis | July 2016–June 2017 |
| Minister of State for Immigration | Robert Goodwill | July 2016–June 2017 |
| Minister of State for Countering Extremism | Susan Williams, Baroness Williams of Trafford | July 2016–June 2017 |
| Parliamentary Under-Secretary of State for Vulnerability, Safeguarding and Countering Extremism | Sarah Newton | July 2016–June 2017 |
| Parliamentary Under-Secretary of State for Internet Safety and Security | Joanna Shields, Baroness Shields (with Culture until Dec 2016) (unpaid) | July 2016–June 2017 |

International Development
| Secretary of State for International Development | **Priti Patel** | July 2016–June 2017 |
| Minister of State | Rory Stewart | July 2016–June 2017 |
| Minister of State | Joyce Anelay, Baroness Anelay of St John's (with Foreign Office) | July–October 2016 |
| Minister of State | Michael Bates, Baron Bates | October 2016–June 2017 |
| Parliamentary Under-Secretary of State | James Wharton | July 2016–June 2017 |

International Trade
| Secretary of State for International Trade; President of the Board of Trade (19 July- | **Liam Fox** | July 2016–June 2017 |
| Minister of State for Trade and Investment | Greg Hands | July 2016–June 2017 |
| Minister of State for Trade Policy | Mark Price, Baron Price | July 2016–June 2017 |
| Parliamentary Under-Secretary of State | Mark Garnier | July 2016–June 2017 |

Justice
| Lord High Chancellor of Great Britain; Secretary of State for Justice | **Liz Truss** | July 2016–June 2017 |
| Minister of State for Courts and Justice | Sir Oliver Heald | July 2016–June 2017 |
| Parliamentary Under-Secretary of State for Prisons and Probation | Sam Gyimah | July 2016–June 2017 |
| Parliamentary Under-Secretary of State for Victims, Youth and Family Justice | Phillip Lee | July 2016–June 2017 |
| MoJ Spokesperson for the Lords | Richard Keen, Baron Keen of Elie | July 2016–June 2017 |

Northern Ireland
| Secretary of State for Northern Ireland | **James Brokenshire** | July 2016–June 2017 |
| Parliamentary Under-Secretary of State | Kris Hopkins | July 2016–June 2017 |
| Parliamentary Under-Secretary of State | Andrew Dunlop, Baron Dunlop (with Scotland) | July 2016–June 2017 |

Scotland
| Secretary of State for Scotland | **David Mundell** | July 2016–June 2017 |
| Parliamentary Under-Secretary of State | Andrew Dunlop, Baron Dunlop (with Northern Ireland) | July 2016–June 2017 |

Transport
| Secretary of State for Transport | **Chris Grayling** | July 2016–June 2017 |
| Minister of State | John Hayes | July 2016–June 2017 |
| Parliamentary Under-Secretary of State | Paul Maynard | July 2016–June 2017 |
| Parliamentary Under-Secretary of State | Andrew Jones | May 2015–June 2017 |
| Parliamentary Under-Secretary of State | Tariq Ahmad, Baron Ahmad of Wimbledon | May 2015–June 2017 |

Treasury
| Chancellor of the Exchequer; Second Lord of the Treasury | **Philip Hammond** | July 2016–June 2017 |
| Chief Secretary to the Treasury | **David Gauke** | July 2016–June 2017 |
| Financial Secretary to the Treasury | Jane Ellison | July 2016–June 2017 |
| Economic Secretary to the Treasury (City Minister) | Simon Kirby | July 2016–June 2017 |
| Commercial Secretary to the Treasury | Jim O'Neill, Baron O'Neill of Gatley (unpaid) | July 2016 – Sept 2016 |
| Commercial Secretary to the Treasury | Lucy Neville-Rolfe, Baroness Neville-Rolfe | Dec 2016–June 2017 |

Wales
| Secretary of State for Wales | **Alun Cairns** | March 2016–June 2017 |
| Parliamentary Under-Secretary of State | Guto Bebb (also a Whip) (unpaid) | March 2016–June 2017 |
| Parliamentary Under-Secretary of State | Nick Bourne, Baron Bourne of Aberystwyth (also with Communities & Local Government) | May 2015–June 2017 |

Work and Pensions
| Secretary of State for Work and Pensions | **Damian Green** | July 2016–June 2017 |
| Minister of State for Disabled People, Work and Health | Penny Mordaunt | July 2016–June 2017 |
| Minister of State for Employment | Damian Hinds | July 2016–June 2017 |
| Minister of State for Welfare Reform | David Freud, Baron Freud (unpaid) | May 2015–31 Dec 2016 |
| Parliamentary under-Secretary of State | Oliver Eden, 8th Baron Henley (also a whip) (unpaid) | 21 Dec 2016–June 2017 |
| Parliamentary Under-Secretary of State for Welfare Delivery | Caroline Nokes | July 2016–June 2017 |
| Parliamentary Under-Secretary of State for Pensions | Richard Harrington | July 2016–June 2017 |

=== Law officers ===
Attorney General's Office
| Attorney General for England and Wales | **Jeremy Wright** | July 2014–June 2017 |
| Solicitor General for England and Wales | Robert Buckland | July 2014–June 2017 |

Office of the Advocate General for Scotland
| Advocate General for Scotland | Richard Keen, Baron Keen of Elie | May 2015–June 2017 |

=== Parliament ===
House Leaders
| Leader of the House of Lords; Lord Keeper of the Privy Seal | **Natalie Evans, Baroness Evans of Bowes Park** | July 2016 – June 2017 |
| Deputy Leader of the House of Lords | Frederick Curzon, 7th Earl Howe (unpaid; also with Defence) | May 2015 – June 2017 |
| Leader of the House of Commons; Lord President of the Council | **David Lidington** | July 2016 – June 2017 |
| Parliamentary Secretary; Deputy Leader of the House of Commons (also a Whip) | Michael Ellis (unpaid) | July 2016 – June 2017 |

House of Commons Whips
| Chief Whip of the House of Commons; Parliamentary Secretary to the Treasury | **Gavin Williamson** | July 2016 – June 2017 |
| Deputy Chief Whip of the House of Commons; Treasurer of the Household | Anne Milton | May 2015 – June 2017 |
| Comptroller of the Household; Whip | Mel Stride | July 2016 – June 2017 |
| Vice-Chamberlain of the Household; Whip | Julian Smith | July 2016 – June 2017 |
| Lords Commissioners of the Treasury; Whips | David Evennett | September 2012 – June 2017 |
| Lords Commissioners of the Treasury; Whips | Steve Barclay | July 2016 – June 2017 |
| Lords Commissioners of the Treasury; Whips | Guto Bebb (also with Wales Office) | March 2016 – June 2017 |
| Lords Commissioners of the Treasury; Whips | Guy Opperman | July 2016 – June 2017 |
| Lords Commissioners of the Treasury; Whips | Andrew Griffiths (unpaid) | July 2016 – June 2017 |
| Lords Commissioners of the Treasury; Whips | Robert Syms | July 2016 – June 2017 |
| Assistant Whips | Chris Heaton-Harris | July 2016 – June 2017 |
| Assistant Whips | Heather Wheeler | July 2016 – June 2017 |
| Assistant Whips | Graham Stuart | July 2016 – June 2017 |
| Assistant Whips | Steve Brine (unpaid) | July 2016 – June 2017 |
| Assistant Whips | Mark Spencer | July 2016 – June 2017 |
| Assistant Whips | Christopher Pincher | July 2016 – June 2017 |
| Assistant Whips | Jackie Doyle-Price | May 2015 – June 2017 |
| Assistant Whips | Michael Ellis (also Deputy Commons Leader) | July 2016 – June 2017 |

House of Lords Whips
| Captain of the Honourable Corps of Gentlemen-at-Arms; Chief Whip of the House of Lords | John Taylor, Baron Taylor of Holbeach | August 2014 – June 2017 |
| Captain of the Yeomen of the Guard; Deputy Chief Whip of the House of Lords | Patrick Stopford, 9th Earl of Courtown | July 2016 – June 2017 |
| Lords and Baronesses in Waiting; Whips | Henry Ashton, 4th Baron Ashton of Hyde | July 2014 – June 2017 |
| Lords and Baronesses in Waiting; Whips | Carlyn Chisholm, Baroness Chisholm of Owlpen (unpaid) | May 2015 – December 2016 |
| Lords and Baronesses in Waiting; Whips | Annabel Goldie, Baroness Goldie (unpaid from Dec 2016) | July 2016 – June 2017 |
| Lords and Baronesses in Waiting; Whips | Peta Buscombe, Baroness Buscombe (unpaid) | December 2016 – June 2017 |
| Lords and Baronesses in Waiting; Whips | Charlotte Vere, Baroness Vere of Norbiton (unpaid) | December 2016 – June 2017 |
| Lords and Baronesses in Waiting; Whips | Nosheena Mobarik, Baroness Mobarik (unpaid) | July 2016 – April 2017 |
| Lords and Baronesses in Waiting; Whips | James Younger, 5th Viscount Younger of Leckie | May 2015 – June 2017 |
| Lords and Baronesses in Waiting; Whips | George Young, Baron Young of Cookham | July 2016 – June 2017 |
| Lords and Baronesses in Waiting; Whips | Oliver Eden, 8th Baron Henley (also with Work & Pensions from Dec 2016) | November 2016 – June 2017 |
| Lords and Baronesses in Waiting; Whips | James O'Shaughnessy, Baron O'Shaughnessy (also with Health) | December 2016 – June 2017 |

== Notes ==
| Preceded by Second Cameron ministry | Government of the United Kingdom; 2016–2017 | Succeeded by Second May ministry |
