= Minister for European Relations (United Kingdom) =

Senior ministerial position in the Government of the United Kingdom

United Kingdom Minister for European Relations
- Royal Arms of His Majesty's Government

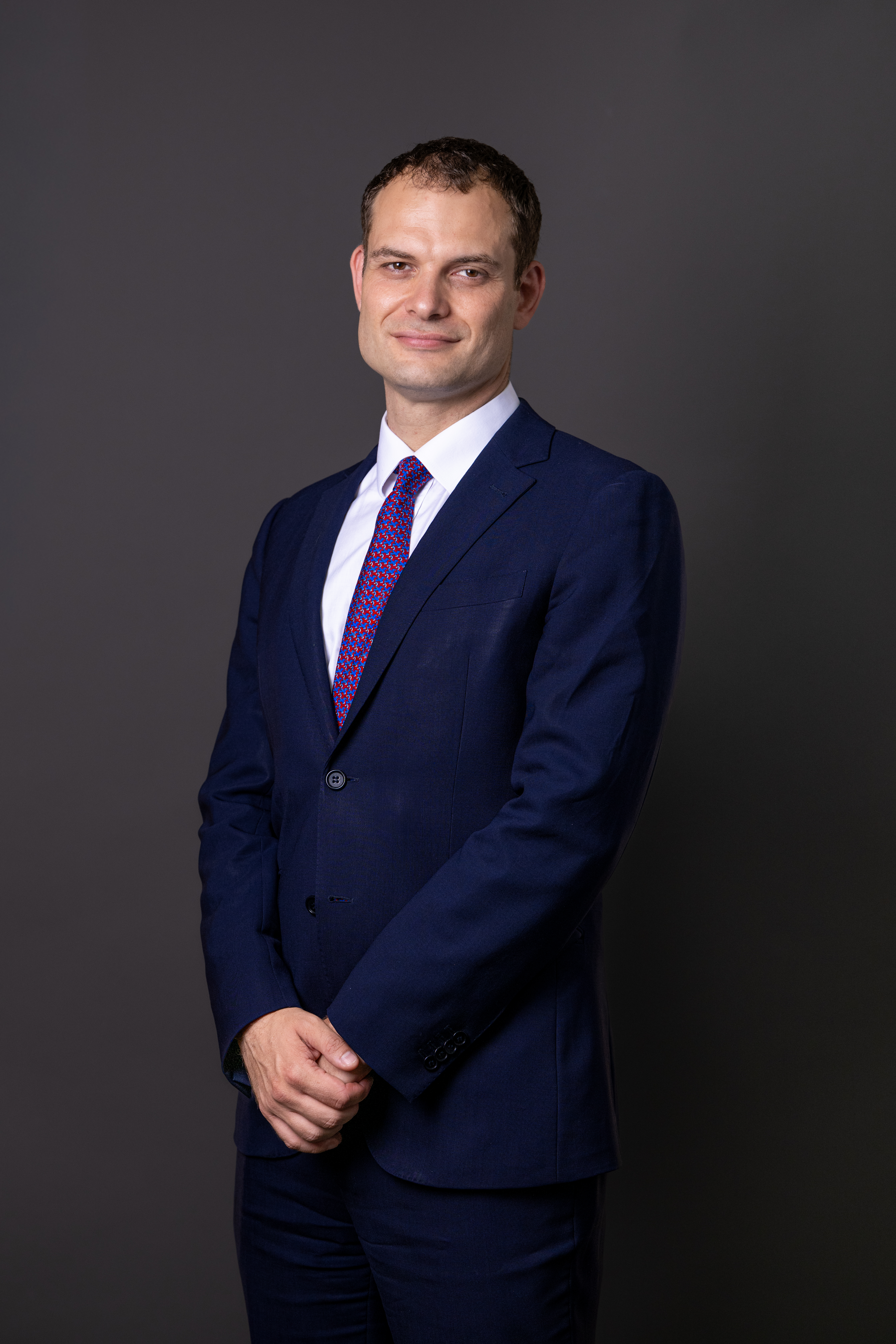
- Incumbent; Hamish Falconer since 20 July 2026
- Cabinet Office; Foreign, Commonwealth and Development Office
- Style: The Right Honourable (within the UK and Commonwealth)
- Type: Minister of the Crown
- Status: Minister of State
- Member of: Cabinet; Privy Council
- Reports to: Prime Minister of the United Kingdom; Deputy Prime Minister
- Seat: Westminster
- Nominator: Prime Minister
- Appointer: The Monarch; (on the advice of the Prime Minister)
- Term length: At His Majesty's pleasure
- Salary: £115,824 per annum (2022) (including £86,584 MP salary)
- Website: www.gov.uk/government/ministers/minister-of-state-minister-for-intergovernmental-relations-and-european-relations

The office of the Minister for European Relations, previously minister for the constitution and European Union relations, minister of state without portfolio and sometimes the constitution minister, is a ministerial role in the Government of the United Kingdom. The current postholder since 20 July 2026 is Hamish Falconer, who also serves as Minister for Intergovernmental Relations.

== List of ministers ==
Name	Portrait	Term of office		Party	Ministry
Parliamentary Secretary for Political and Constitutional Reform
Mark Harper		11 May 2010	4 September 2012	Conservative	Cameron–Clegg
Chloe Smith		4 September 2012	6 October 2013	Conservative	Cameron–Clegg
Minister of State for Cities and Constitution
Greg Clark		7 October 2013	15 July 2014	Conservative	Cameron–Clegg
Parliamentary Secretary for the Constitution
Sam Gyimah		15 July 2014	12 May 2015	Conservative	Cameron–Clegg
John Penrose		12 May 2015	17 July 2016	Conservative	Cameron (II)
Chris Skidmore		17 July 2016	8 January 2018	Conservative	May (I)
Chris Skidmore		17 July 2016	8 January 2018	Conservative	May (II)
Chloe Smith		8 January 2018	13 February 2020	Conservative	May (II)
Chloe Smith		8 January 2018	13 February 2020	Conservative	Johnson (I)
Chloe Smith		8 January 2018	13 February 2020	Conservative	Johnson (II)
Minister of State for the Constitution and Devolution
Chloe Smith		13 February 2020	16 September 2021	Conservative	Johnson (II)
Minister of State for EU Relations
David Frost, Baron Frost		1 March 2021	18 December 2021	Conservative	Johnson (II)
Minister of State without Portfolio
Nigel Adams		16 September 2021	5 September 2022	Conservative	Johnson (II)
Sir Gavin Williamson		25 October 2022	8 November 2022	Conservative	Sunak
Esther McVey		13 November 2023	5 July 2024	Conservative	Sunak
Minister for the Constitution and European Union Relations
Nick Thomas-Symonds	Portrait of Nick Thomas-Symonds	8 July 2024	20 July 2026	Labour	Starmer
Minister for European Relations
Hamish Falconer		20 July 2026	incumbent	Labour	Burnham
