= Hamish Falconer =

British politician and diplomat (born 1985)

The Right Honourable Hamish Falconer MP
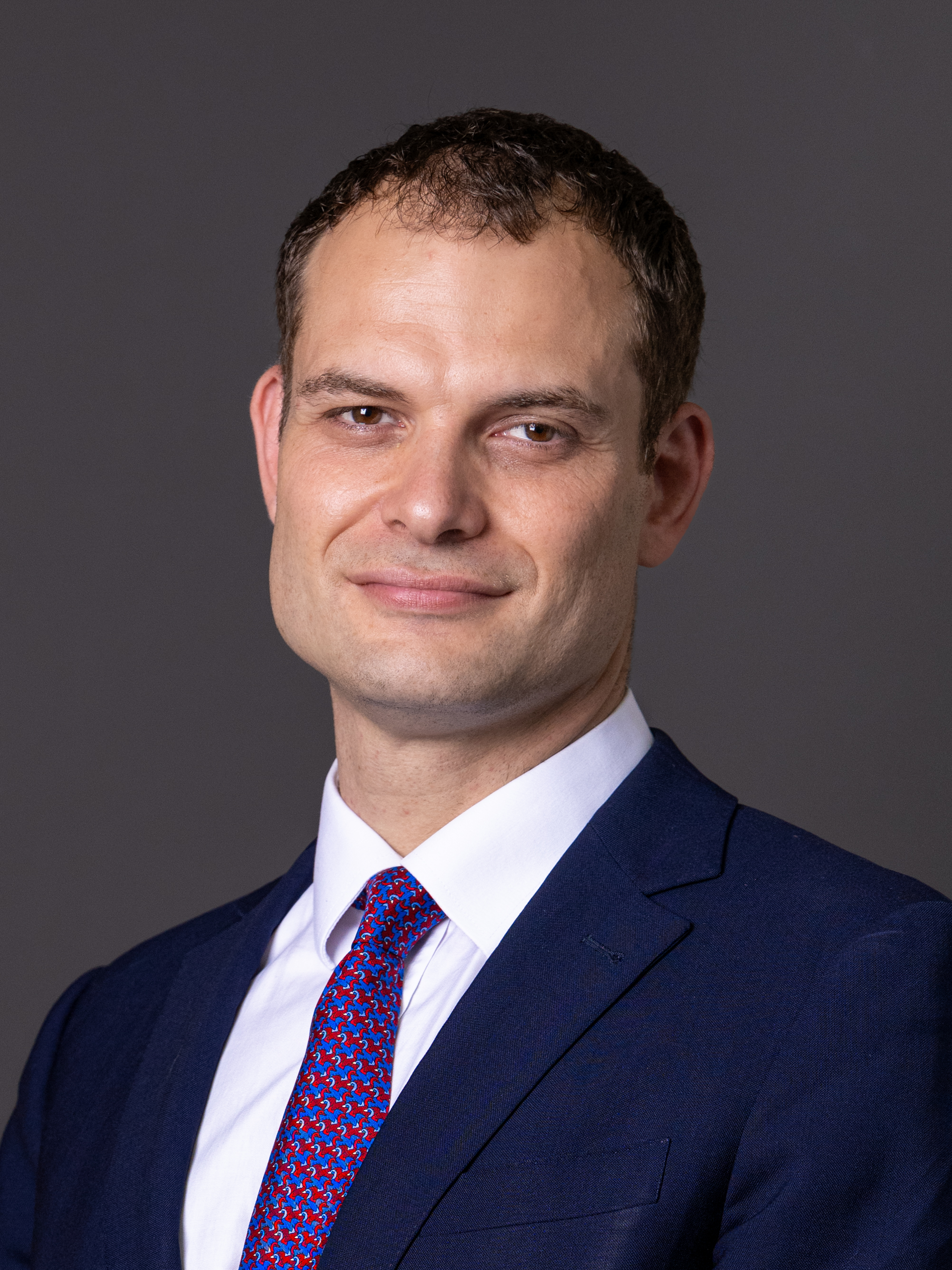
- Official portrait, 2026

Minister for Intergovernmental Relations and European Relations
- Incumbent
- Assumed office 20 July 2026
- Prime Minister: Andy Burnham
- Preceded by: Darren Jones (Note: as Minister for Intergovernmental Relations); Nick Thomas-Symonds (Note: as Minister for the Constitution and European Union Relations)

Parliamentary Under-Secretary of State for Middle East, North Africa, Afghanistan and Pakistan
- In office 18 July 2024 – 20 July 2026
- Prime Minister: Keir Starmer
- Preceded by: The Lord Ahmad of Wimbledon
- Succeeded by: Stephen Doughty

Member of Parliament for Lincoln
- Incumbent
- Assumed office 4 July 2024
- Preceded by: Karl McCartney
- Majority: 8,793 (20.8%)

Personal details
- Born: Hamish Nicholas Falconer; 20 December 1985 (age 40)
- Party: Labour
- Parents: The Lord Falconer of Thoroton (father); Marianna, Lady Falconer of Thoroton (mother)
- Education: St John's College, Cambridge (BA)
- Website: hamishfalconer.co.uk

Hamish Nicholas Falconer (born 20 December 1985) is a British politician and former diplomat who has served as Minister for Intergovernmental Relations and European Relations since July 2026. A member of the Labour Party, he has been the Member of Parliament (MP) for Lincoln since 2024.

== Early life ==
Hamish Nicholas Falconer was born on 20 December 1985, the son of Charlie Falconer, Baron Falconer of Thoroton, who served as Lord Chancellor under Tony Blair, and Marianna Hildyard KC, Lady Falconer of Thoroton, a circuit judge. Falconer attended Westminster School and then St John's College, Cambridge, graduating in 2008 in Human, Social and Political Science, before joining the diplomatic service.

== Early career ==
Falconer worked in the UK government's Department for International Development from 2009 to 2013, and then the Foreign and Commonwealth Office until 2022. His diplomatic career centred on national security and humanitarian relief, including hostage recovery. Whilst in the Foreign Office, he spent a year at Yale University as a "World Fellow".

Since leaving the Foreign, Commonwealth, and Development Office, Falconer worked as an associate fellow at the IPPR, and was a policy fellow at the think tank Labour Together alongside standing as a candidate for Parliament.

== Parliamentary career ==
Shortly after being elected as MP for Lincoln in July 2024, Falconer was appointed as Parliamentary Under-Secretary of State for the Middle East, Afghanistan and Pakistan by Prime Minister Keir Starmer.

Falconer voted in favour of means-testing the Winter Fuel Payment for pensioners.

=== Foreign Office minister (2024–2026) ===
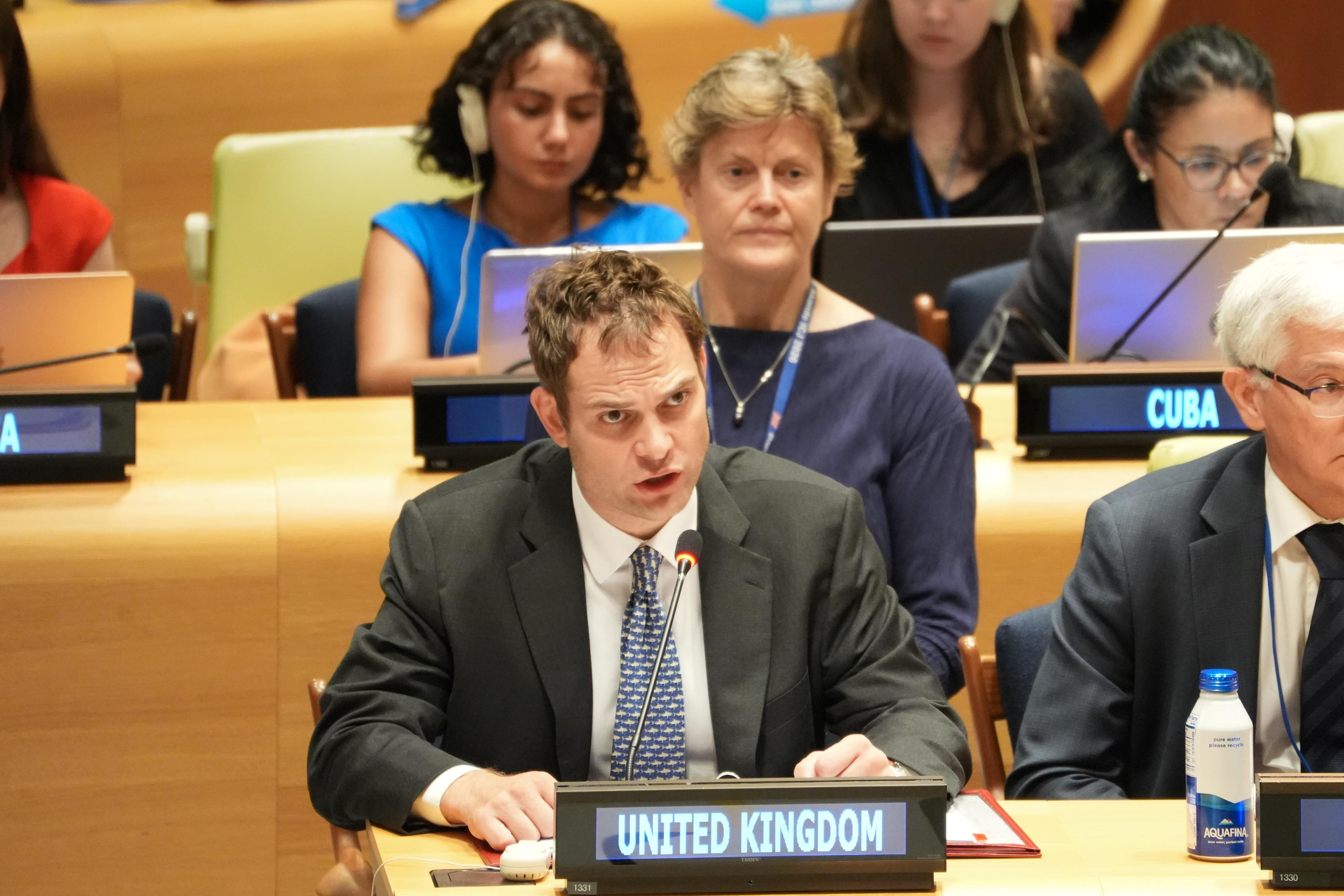
Falconer at the United Nations Two-State Solution Conference, 2025

As Minister for the Middle East and North Africa, he was responsible for meeting with high-profile Egyptian-British political activist Alaa Abd El-Fattah. Falconer described the task of securing his release from prison as "at the top of my priority list, as well as that of the Foreign Secretary and the Prime Minister." He stated that he was "very glad" when El-Fattah subsequently arrived in the United Kingdom at the end of December 2025. This proved to be controversial after historical posts on X (formerly Twitter) by El-Fattah emerged including describing British people as "dogs and monkeys" as well as apparently endorsing killing Zionists and the police.

Falconer was under investigation, in April 2025, for a breach of the Ministerial Code of Conduct for failing to register his share holdings in consultancy firm Upon a Hill Limited.

Falconer faced intense parliamentary scrutiny over the Starmer government's stance on the Gaza war and genocide. Falconer faced scrutiny and criticism for defending the government's stance that Israel is not committing genocide in Gaza, which contradicted a UN Commission of Inquiry report which declared such acts are occurring.

Falconer continued to defend the UK government's policy, which led to accusations of misleading the public and Labour party members, with Labour figures like John McDonnell condemning the government for failing to confront the term genocide despite UN findings.

In July 2026, Falconer declined to answer questions from a Declassified UK journalist regarding the UK government's failure to stop British nationals fighting for Israel in Gaza who may have committed war crimes. This came after over 26,000 people signed a letter asking the UK Foreign Commonwealth and Development Office to investigate UK citizens who fought in Gaza.

In February 2026, his comment regarding a pause in the Chagos Islands handover deal caused diplomatic confusion with the Foreign Commonwealth and Development Office having to state he had "misspoken" and that no pause had actually occurred.

=== Cabinet career (2026–present) ===
On 20 July 2026, Falconer was promoted to Minister for Intergovernmental Relations and European Relations by the new Prime Minister Andy Burnham. Although not a Cabinet Minister, he will attend cabinet. He has stated that he intends to seek a 'deeper relationship with the EU without reopening discussions on the single market or customs union.

== Personal life ==
Falconer has been married since June 2026.

== Honours ==
On 21 July 2026, Falconer was sworn into the Privy Council, entitling him to be styled with the honorific title "The Right Honourable" for life.

== Notes ==
Parliament of the United Kingdom
Preceded by Karl McCartney	Member of Parliament for Lincoln; 2024–present	Incumbent
