= Minister of State for the Middle East, North Africa, Afghanistan and Pakistan =

United Kingdom government position

United Kingdom Minister of State for the Middle East, Afghanistan and Pakistan
- Royal Arms of His Majesty's Government

- Incumbent; Stephen Doughty since 21 July 2026
- Foreign, Commonwealth and Development Office
- Style: Minister
- Nominator: Prime Minister
- Appointer: The King (on the advice of the Prime Minister)
- Term length: At His Majesty's pleasure
- Formation: July 2016 (First May ministry)
- First holder: Joyce Anelay, Baroness Anelay
- Website: Official website

The minister of state for the Middle East, Afghanistan and Pakistan is a mid-level position in the Foreign, Commonwealth and Development Office in the British government. Stephen Doughty MP was appointed to the role by Prime Minister Andy Burnham in July 2026.

== History ==
The office was previously held by Sayeeda Warsi, Baroness Warsi when it was styled as Senior Minister of State for Foreign and Commonwealth Affairs and Joyce Anelay, Baroness Anelay of St Johns when it was styled as Minister of State for South Asia and the Commonwealth.

== Responsibilities ==
The minister has the following ministerial responsibilities:

- Middle East and North Africa
- Afghanistan and Pakistan
- consular and crisis operations

== Ministers ==
Name	Portrait	Term of office		Political party	P.M.	F.Sec.
Minister of State for International Energy Policy
David Howell, Baron Howell of Guildford		14 May 2010	4 September 2012	Conservative	Cameron	Hague
Senior Minister of State for Foreign and Commonwealth Affairs
Sayeeda Warsi, Baroness Warsi		4 September 2012	5 August 2014	Conservative	Cameron	Hague
Minister of State for South Asia and the Commonwealth
Joyce Anelay, Baroness Anelay of St Johns		6 August 2014	12 June 2017	Conservative	Cameron; May	Hammond; Johnson
Tariq Ahmad, Baron Ahmad of Wimbledon		13 June 2017	2 September 2020	Conservative	May; Johnson	Hunt; Raab
Minister of State for South and Central Asia, North Africa, United Nations and the Commonwealth
Tariq Ahmad, Baron Ahmad of Wimbledon		2 September 2020	22 September 2022	Conservative	Johnson	Raab; Truss
Minister of State for the Middle East, South Asia and the United Nations
Tariq Ahmad, Baron Ahmad of Wimbledon		22 September 2022	30 October 2022	Conservative	Truss	Cleverly
Minister of State for the Middle East, North Africa, South Asia and the United Nations
Tariq Ahmad, Baron Ahmad of Wimbledon		30 October 2022	14 November 2023	Conservative	Sunak	Cleverly
Minister of State for the Middle East, North Africa, South Asia, Commonwealth and United Nations
Tariq Ahmad, Baron Ahmad of Wimbledon		14 November 2023	5 July 2024	Conservative	Sunak	Cameron
Parliamentary Under-Secretary of State for the Middle East, Afghanistan and Pakistan
Hamish Falconer		18 July 2024	20 July 2026	Labour	Starmer	Lammy; Cooper
Minister of State for the Middle East, Afghanistan and Pakistan
Stephen Doughty		21 July 2026	Incumbent	Labour	Burnham	Miliband
