= Steve Bassam, Baron Bassam of Brighton =

British politician and life peer (born 1953)

The Right Honourable The Lord Bassam of Brighton PC
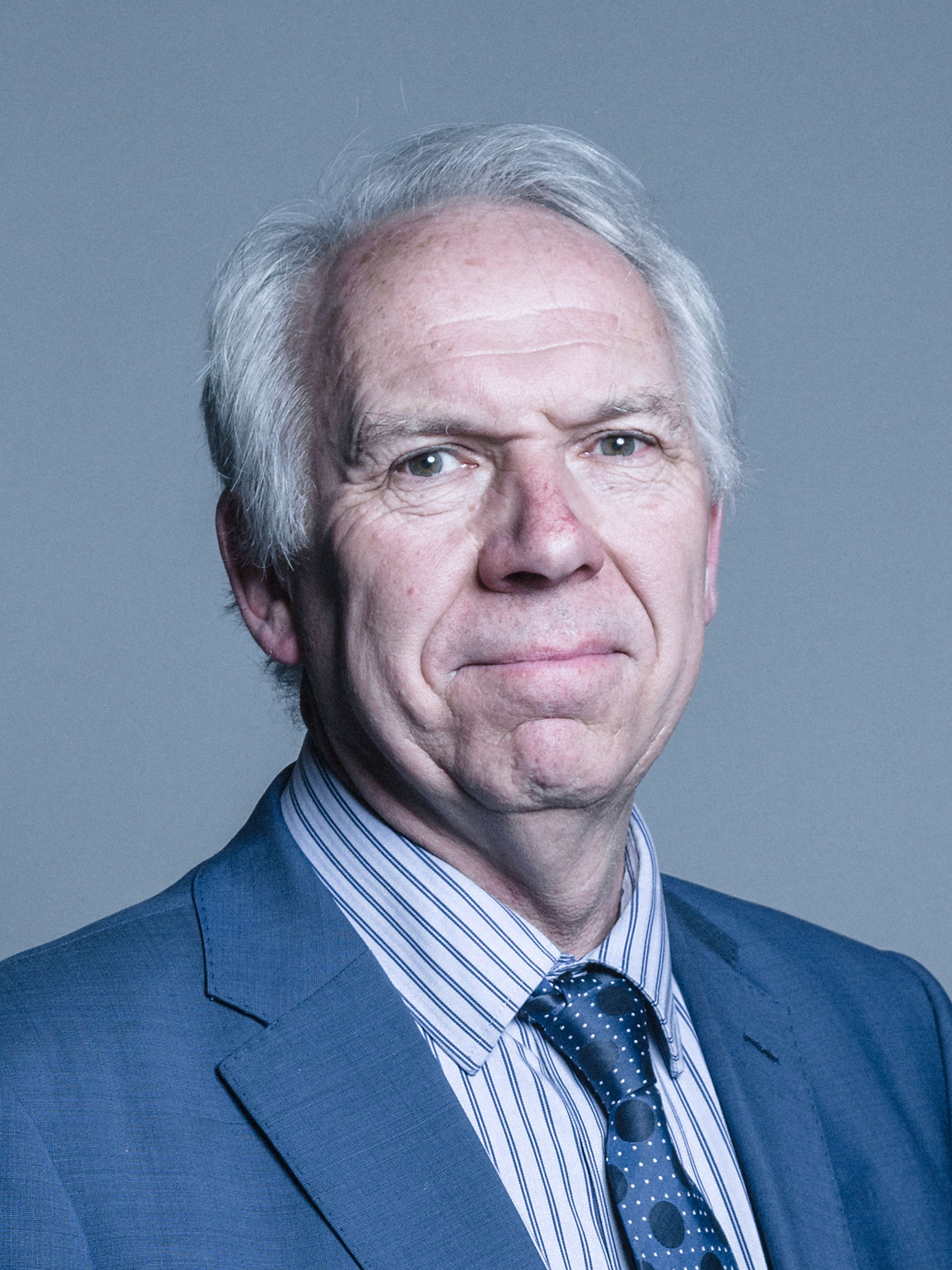
- Official portrait, 2018

Member of the House of Lords
- Lord Temporal
- Life peerage 3 November 1997
Former offices 1999–2018
Opposition Chief Whip of the House of Lords
In office 11 May 2010 – 24 January 2018
Leader	Harman (Acting), Miliband, Corbyn
Preceded by	The Baroness Anelay of St John's
Succeeded by	The Lord McAvoy
Chief Whip of the House of Lords Captain of the Honourable Corps of Gentlemen-at-Arms
In office 3 October 2008 – 11 May 2010
Prime Minister	Gordon Brown
Preceded by	The Baroness Royall of Blaisdon
Succeeded by	The Baroness Anelay of St John's
Lord-in-waiting Government Whip
In office 7 June 2001 – 5 October 2008
Prime Minister	Blair, Brown
Preceded by	The Baroness Amos
Succeeded by	The Lord Tunnicliffe
Parliamentary Under-Secretary of State for Home Affairs
In office 29 July 1999 – 7 June 2001
Prime Minister	Tony Blair
Preceded by	Kate Hoey
Succeeded by	Beverley Hughes

Personal details
- Born: John Steven Bassam; 11 June 1953 (age 73) Hull, England
- Party: Labour and Co-operative
- Education: University of Sussex; University of Kent

John Steven Bassam, Baron Bassam of Brighton (born 11 June 1953) is a British Labour and Co-operative politician and life peer. He has sat in the House of Lords since 1997.

== Background ==
Bassam grew up on a council estate in Great Bentley, Essex and went to the local boys secondary modern school in Pathfield Road, now Clacton Coastal Academy in Clacton-on-Sea. He then went to study at the universities of Sussex and Kent, where he received a Master's in social work. Bassam then began his career as a social worker at Camden London Borough Council. He moved on to other roles in local government, serving as an assistant secretary at the Association of Metropolitan Authorities, later the Local Government Association.

Bassam was also a squatter and a committed far-left anarchist during his early years in Brighton, where he founded a squatters union alongside anti-fascist and anti-Zionist activist Tony Greenstein, which campaigned for the rights of squatters to occupy empty properties and improve the conditions of the squats.

In January 1976, Bassam led the opposition to the eviction of a family from a house on West Hill Road, saying "We will gladly vacate the premises if we are assured that the family at the top of the housing list is given the house to live in."

Interviewed in 2013, he said that he would not support anyone who occupies someone else's home, though he opposed the criminalisation of squatting in 2012 as an unnecessary piece of "gesture politics".

== Career ==
Bassam has worked as a social worker, a legal adviser for local authorities, and in management consulting for KPMG and Capita.

== Political career ==
Bassam became involved in local politics and was elected a Brighton councillor. He rose to become Leader of Brighton, then Brighton and Hove Council, from 1987 until 1999. He stood unsuccessfully for Parliament in Brighton Kemptown at the 1987 general election against the Conservative MP Andrew Bowden.

On 3 November 1997, he was created a life peer as Baron Bassam of Brighton, of Brighton in the County of East Sussex, and was introduced in the House of Lords on 18 November, sitting on the Labour benches.

Bassam was promoted to the frontbenches as parliamentary under-secretary of state for the Home Office in 1999. In 2001, he was appointed a Lord-in-waiting (Government whip in the Lords). He served in that role and as Government spokesman for the Home Office until 2008. During the same period he served at various times as Government spokesman for a number of other departments: Lord Chancellor's Department 2001–04, Cabinet Office 2001–07, Office of the Deputy Prime Minister (subsequently Communities and Local Government) 2002–04, 2005–07, 2008, Attorney General's Office 2005–08, Transport 2007–08, Culture, Media and Sport 2008.

In 2008, Gordon Brown promoted him to the role of Labour Chief Whip, and therefore Government Chief Whip and Captain of the Honourable Corps of Gentlemen-at-Arms. On 8 July 2009 he was made a Privy Councillor. When Labour moved into Opposition in 2010, he became Opposition Chief Whip.

In December 2011 and January 2012, Bassam engaged in a vigorous debate on Twitter with Brighton and Hove Greens about budget cuts by the council's Green administration.

=== 2017 expenses scandal ===
In December 2017 a Daily Express article claimed that Lord Bassam wrongly "claimed £260,000 in second home allowance despite only having one house". The article noted that "Lord Bassam, the Labour chief whip in the Lords and a key member of Jeremy Corbyn’s team, was also given over £40,000 of taxpayers’ cash to cover the costs of his commute. He insisted he has not breached any rules but has offered to pay back travel expenses from his Brighton home to Westminster." He agreed to stand down as Labour's Chief Whip in the House of Lords following the appointment of a successor. He also referred himself to the House of Lords Commissioner for Standards over the accusations.

The Commissioner found that Bassam had claimed both the Lords allowance and the Lords Office Holders Allowance for travel costs, but had done so mistakenly rather than dishonestly. The Commissioner also noted that "his mistake was compounded by a degree of negligence in not reading the guidance provided to him." The Committee for Privileges and Conduct asked that Bassam repay £15,737 in over-claimed travel allowance and write a letter of apology to the Committee. Bassam stated he would resign as chief whip once a replacement had been elected.

Political offices
Preceded by The Baroness Royall of Blaisdon	Chief Whip of the House of Lords; 2008–2010	Succeeded by The Baroness Anelay of St John's
Preceded by The Baroness Royall of Blaisdon	Captain of the Honourable Corps of Gentlemen-at-Arms; 2008–2010	Succeeded by The Baroness Anelay of St John's
Preceded by The Baroness Anelay of St John's	Shadow Chief Whip of the House of Lords; 2010–present	Incumbent
Party political offices
Preceded by The Baroness Royall of Blaisdon	Labour Chief Whip of the House of Lords; 2008–present	Incumbent
Orders of precedence in the United Kingdom
Preceded by The Lord Stone of Blackheath	Gentlemen; Baron Bassam of Brighton	Followed by The Lord Simpson of Dunkeld
