= Tariq Ahmad, Baron Ahmad of Wimbledon =

British businessman, politician and life peer (born 1968)

The Right Honourable The Lord Ahmad of Wimbledon KCMG
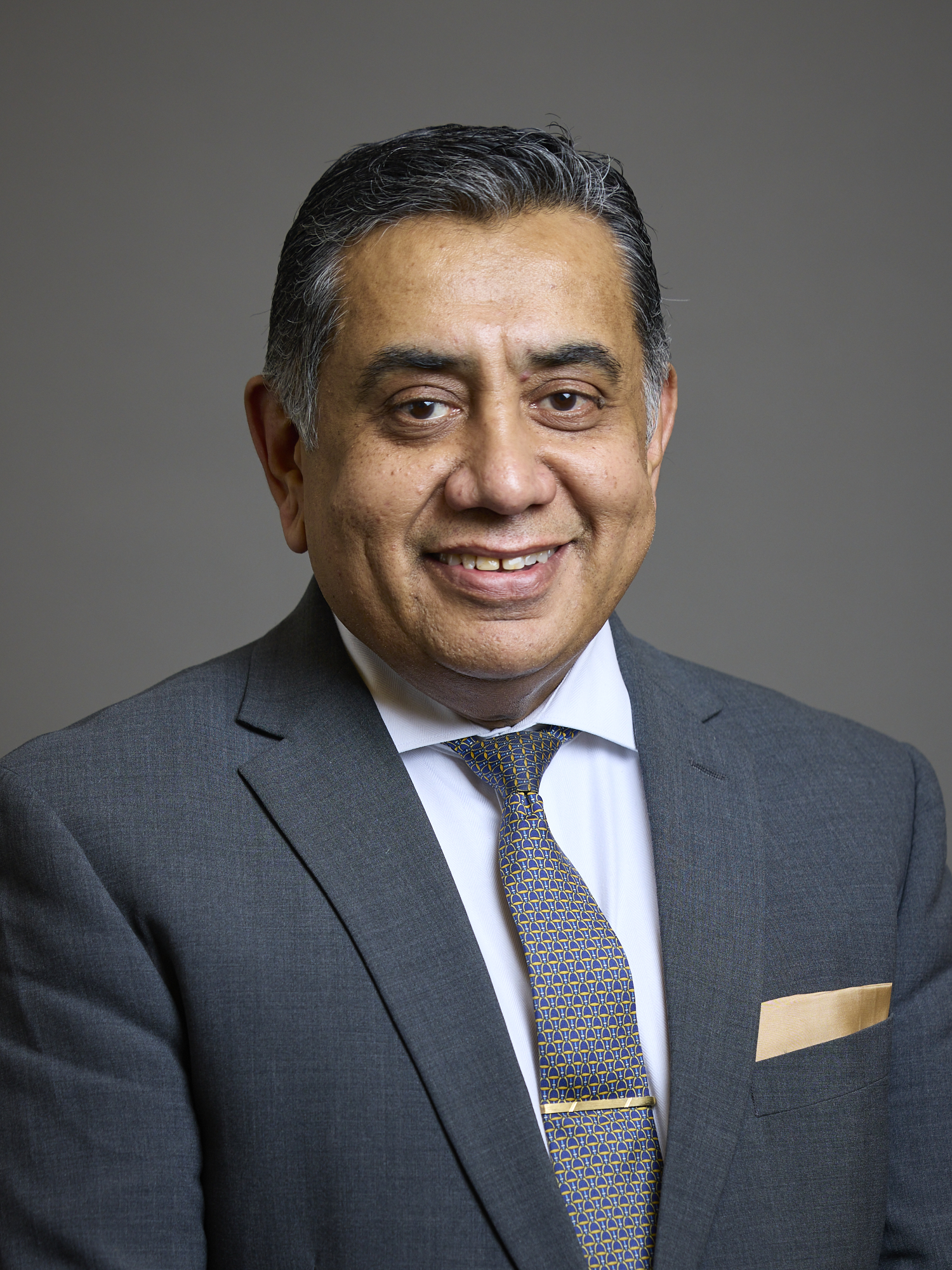
- Official portrait, 2024

Minister of State for the Middle East, North Africa, South Asia, Commonwealth and United Nations (Note: South Asia and the Commonwealth (June 2017–September 2020); South and Central Asia, North Africa, United Nations and the Commonwealth (September 2020–September 2022); Middle East, South Asia and the United Nations (September–October 2022); Middle East, North Africa, South Asia and the United Nations (October 2022–November 2023))
- In office 13 June 2017 – 5 July 2024
- Prime Minister: Theresa May; Boris Johnson; Liz Truss; Rishi Sunak
- Preceded by: The Baroness Anelay of St Johns
- Succeeded by: Hamish Falconer

Parliamentary Under-Secretary of State for Transport
- In office 11 May 2015 – 11 June 2017
- Prime Minister: David Cameron; Theresa May
- Preceded by: Claire Perry
- Succeeded by: The Lord Callanan

Parliamentary Under-Secretary of State for Countering Extremism
- In office 11 May 2015 – 13 July 2016
- Prime Minister: David Cameron
- Preceded by: The Lord Bates
- Succeeded by: Sarah Newton

Parliamentary Under-Secretary of State for Communities and Local Government
- In office 15 July 2014 – 11 May 2015
- Prime Minister: David Cameron
- Preceded by: The Baroness Stowell of Beeston
- Succeeded by: The Baroness Williams of Trafford

Lord-in-waiting Government Whip
- In office 4 September 2012 – 15 July 2014
- Prime Minister: David Cameron
- Preceded by: The Baroness Verma
- Succeeded by: The Baroness Garden of Frognal

Member of the House of Lords
- Lord Temporal
- Life peerage 13 January 2011

Merton London Borough Councillor for Wimbledon Park
- In office 2 May 2002 – 22 May 2014
- Preceded by: New Ward
- Succeeded by: Janice Howard

Personal details
- Born: Tariq Mahmood Ahmad; 3 April 1968 (age 58) Lambeth, London, England
- Party: Conservative
- Spouse: Saddiqa Ahmad
- Children: 2
- Education: London South Bank University (BA)

Tariq Mahmood Ahmad, Baron Ahmad of Wimbledon, KCMG (born 3 April 1968), is a British businessman and a Conservative life peer. In government he most recently served as Minister of State for the Middle East, North Africa, South Asia, Commonwealth and United Nations (2017–2024) at the Foreign, Commonwealth and Development Office.

== Early years ==
Born in Lambeth, to Punjabi-speaking immigrant parents from India. His father was born in Gurdaspur and his mother was born in Jodhpur in British India. Tariq Ahmad was educated at Rutlish School, Merton Park, southwest London.

== Career ==
In 1991, he entered NatWest's Graduate Management programme, eventually working as Head of Marketing, Sponsorship and Branding and in 2000 went to work for AllianceBernstein. In 2004, he joined Sucden Financial, where he served on the Executive Committee and as Director of Marketing, Strategy and Research. He is an Associate of the Institute of Financial Services and a member of the Institute of Directors.

From 1999 to 2008 he served as vice-president of AMYA, a British Ahmadi Muslim youth organisation. From 2001 to 2006, he served as a governor of Wimbledon Park Primary school. He joined the Conservative Party in 1994. In 2002, he was elected a Councillor in Wimbledon. He contested Croydon North for the Conservatives in 2005. From 2008 to 2010, he served as Vice-Chairman of the Conservative Party.

He is a part of the Ahmadiyya Muslim Community, and was a national vice-president of the Ahmadiyya Muslim Association's youth organisation from 2003.

== Parliamentary career ==
On 13 January 2011, he was made a life peer, and was created Baron Ahmad of Wimbledon, of Wimbledon in the London Borough of Merton. He formally joined the House of Lords on 17 January. In 2014, Ahmad was promoted to Parliamentary Under-Secretary of State at DCLG. After the 2015 general election, he was appointed jointly as Minister for Skills and Aviation Security at the Department for Transport and Minister for Countering Extremism at the Home Office. In 2016, he was appointed Minister for Aviation, International Trade and Europe at the Department for Transport in the first May ministry.

After the 2017 general election, Ahmad was appointed Minister of State at the Foreign and Commonwealth Office with responsibilities to the Commonwealth, the United Nations, and the Prime Minister's Special Representative on Preventing Sexual Violence in Conflict, and later South Asia, the Middle East and North Africa.

== Honours ==
In the 2024 King's Birthday Honours, he was appointed Knight Commander of the Order of St Michael and St George (KCMG) "for services to British foreign policy, humanitarian affairs and the Commonwealth, faith and integration, community and families in the UK.".

== Arms ==
Coat of arms of Tariq Ahmad, Baron Ahmad of Wimbledon
Crest Rising from a fret fesswise a falcon Sable. Escutcheon Or on a pale between two peacocks in their pride Proper three frets throughout Or on a chief Azure a double-headed eagle Or between two decrescents each enclosing a mullet Argent. Supporters Dexter a lion sinister a Punjab urial both Sable and each gorged with an eastern crown Or.

== Notes ==
Orders of precedence in the United Kingdom
Preceded by The Lord Loomba	Gentlemen; Baron Ahmad of Wimbledon	Followed by The Lord Edmiston
