= John Taylor, Baron Taylor of Holbeach =

British politician (born 1943)

The Right Honourable The Lord Taylor of Holbeach CBE PC FRSA
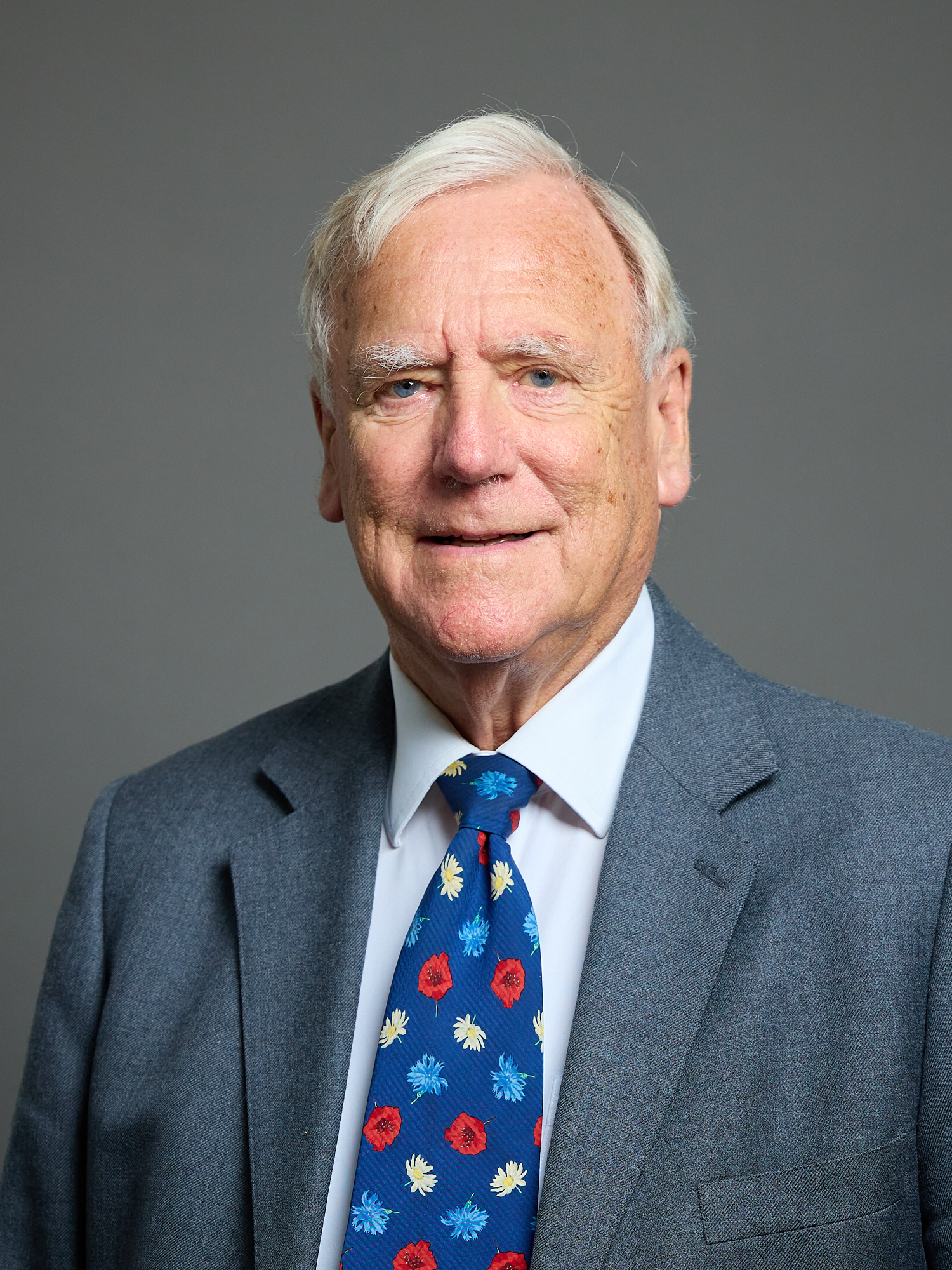
- Official portrait, 2025

Chief Whip of the House of Lords Captain of the Honourable Corps of Gentlemen-at-Arms
- In office 6 August 2014 – 24 July 2019
- Prime Minister: David Cameron; Theresa May
- Preceded by: The Baroness Anelay of St John's
- Succeeded by: The Lord Ashton of Hyde

Parliamentary Under-Secretary of State for Criminal Information
- In office 4 September 2012 – 6 August 2014
- Prime Minister: David Cameron
- Preceded by: Lynne Featherstone
- Succeeded by: The Lord Bates

Parliamentary Under-Secretary of State for Resource Management, the Local Environment and Environmental Science
- In office 16 September 2011 – 4 September 2012
- Prime Minister: David Cameron
- Preceded by: The Lord Henley
- Succeeded by: The Lord de Mauley

Member of the House of Lords
- Lord Temporal
- Life peerage 31 May 2006

Personal details
- Born: 12 November 1943 (age 82)
- Party: Conservative

John Derek Taylor, Baron Taylor of Holbeach, CBE PC FRSA (born 12 November 1943) is a British Conservative politician and former Government Chief Whip in the House of Lords.

== Biography ==
Taylor is the son of Percy Otto Taylor and Ethel Brocklehurst. His family own Taylors Bulbs, a company that sells daffodil bulbs. He was educated at Holbeach Primary School in Holbeach, Lincolnshire, St. Felix School in Felixstowe, and at Bedford School in the county town of Bedfordshire.

He served on the executive committee of the East Midlands Conservative Council from 1966 to 1998, and contested the Parliamentary constituency of Chesterfield in the general elections of February and October 1974. He later held many roles within the voluntary wing of the Conservative Party and was created a Commander of the Order of the British Empire in 1992 for political service. He served as chairman of the National Conservative Convention from 2000 to 2003. He was created a life peer as Baron Taylor of Holbeach, of South Holland in the county of Lincolnshire, on 31 May 2006. He is an honorary member of Conservative Friends of Poland. Taylor was appointed junior minister at the Department for Environment, Food and Rural Affairs in September 2011, and moved in September 2012 to a ministerial post at the Home Office as Parliamentary Under-Secretary of State for Criminal Information.

On 6 August 2014, in a mini-reshuffle prompted by the resignation of Baroness Warsi, Lord Taylor was appointed to the post of Captain of the Honourable Corps of Gentlemen-at-Arms and chief whip in the House of Lords, continuing in that office until the end of the Second May ministry.

Coat of arms of John Taylor, Baron Taylor of Holbeach
Crest A badger sejant erect Gules the head Argent the eye strip Gules holding in the dexter forepaw over the shoulder a shovel Or and supporting with the sinister forepaw a book palewise Argent bound Or. Escutcheon Argent guttee de sang and fretty Azure on a pale Gules three tulip heads Or. Supporters Dexter a hare Azure gorged with a plain collar attached thereto a chain reflexed over the back Or sinister a heron Azure beaked and legged Or. Motto So To Grow

Political offices
Preceded by The Baroness Anelay of St John's	Chief Whip of the House of Lords; 2014–2019	Succeeded by The Lord Ashton of Hyde
Preceded by The Baroness Anelay of St John's	Captain of the Honourable Corps of Gentlemen-at-Arms; 2014–2019	Succeeded by The Lord Ashton of Hyde
Party political offices
Preceded by Robin Hodgson	Chair of the National Conservative Convention; 2000–2003	Succeeded by Raymond Monbiot
Preceded by The Baroness Anelay of St John's	Conservative Chief Whip of the House of Lords; 2014–2019	Succeeded by The Lord Ashton of Hyde
Orders of precedence in the United Kingdom
Preceded by The Lord Lee of Trafford	Gentlemen; Baron Taylor of Holbeach	Followed by The Lord Burnett
