= Joyce Anelay, Baroness Anelay of St Johns =

British politician and life peer (born 1947)

The Right Honourable The Baroness Anelay of St Johns DBE PC FRSA
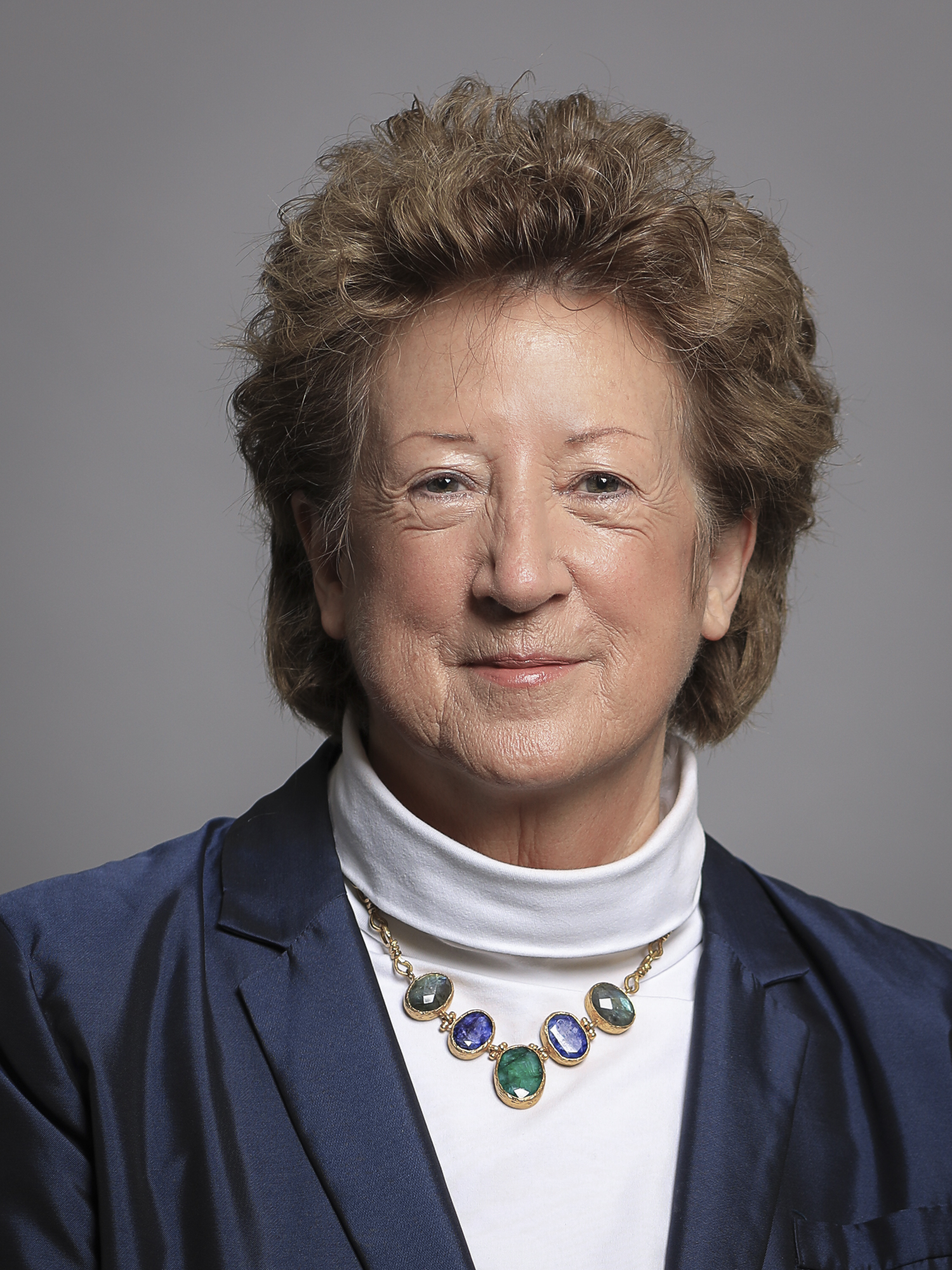
- Official portrait, 2020

Chair of the International Relations and Defence Committee
- In office 1 July 2019 – 31 January 2023
- Preceded by: The Lord Howell of Guildford
- Succeeded by: The Lord Ashton of Hyde

Minister of State for Exiting the European Union
- In office 12 June 2017 – 27 October 2017
- Prime Minister: Theresa May
- Preceded by: David Jones
- Succeeded by: The Lord Callanan

Minister of State for South Asia and the Commonwealth
- In office 6 August 2014 – 12 June 2017
- Prime Minister: David Cameron; Theresa May
- Preceded by: The Baroness Warsi
- Succeeded by: The Lord Ahmad of Wimbledon

Minister of State for International Development
- In office 13 July 2016 – 14 October 2016
- Prime Minister: Theresa May
- Preceded by: Office established
- Succeeded by: The Lord Bates

Government Chief Whip in the House of Lords Captain of the Honourable Corps of Gentlemen-at-Arms
- In office 12 May 2010 – 6 August 2014
- Prime Minister: David Cameron
- Preceded by: The Lord Bassam of Brighton
- Succeeded by: The Lord Taylor of Holbeach

Opposition Chief Whip in the House of Lords
- In office 2 July 2007 – 11 May 2010
- Leader: David Cameron
- Preceded by: The Lord Cope of Berkeley
- Succeeded by: The Lord Bassam of Brighton

Member of the House of Lords
- Lord Temporal
- Life peerage 14 October 1996

Personal details
- Born: Joyce Anne Clarke; 17 July 1947 (age 79) London, England
- Party: Conservative
- Spouse: Richard Anelay (m. 1970)
- Education: University of Bristol; University of London; Brunel University

Joyce Anne Anelay, Baroness Anelay of St Johns, DBE PC FRSA (born 17 July 1947), is a British politician who has sat in the House of Lords since 1996 as a life peer. A member of the Conservative Party, she served as a Minister of State at the Foreign and Commonwealth Office from August 2014 to June 2017, when she was appointed a Minister of State at the Department for Exiting the European Union in the Second May ministry, after the 2017 reshuffle. She stood down from the role in October 2017 citing health reasons.

Anelay was Government Chief Whip in the House of Lords from 12 May 2010 until 6 August 2014, having previously been Opposition Chief Whip prior to the 2010 general election.

== Early life ==
Born in Hackney on 17 July 1947, daughter of Stanley Clarke, she was christened Joyce Anne and was educated locally at Enfield County School. She attended Bristol University, graduating with the degree of BA and after further studies at Brunel University of London (BUL), took the postgraduate degree of MA.

Following university, Anelay worked as a secondary school teacher from 1969 to 1974. She later became a volunteer adviser with the Citizens' Advice Bureau, served as a Justice of the Peace for Surrey and sat on the Social Security Appeal Tribunal.

== Political career ==
Prior to her elevation to the peerage, Anelay held a number of senior posts in the Conservative Party organisation. She was Chair of the Conservative Women's National Committee from 1993 to 1996, appointed Officer of the Most Excellent Order of the British Empire (OBE) in 1990, and in 1995 was promoted Dame Commander (DBE). She was created a Life Peer as Baroness Anelay of St Johns, of St John's in the County of Surrey in 1996.

Between May 1997 and June 2002, Baroness Anelay served in various Conservative front bench posts, including Opposition Whip and Shadow Minister for Culture, Media and Sport. She was a Shadow Home Office Minister from June 2002 to July 2007, and from 2 July 2007, she served as Opposition Chief Whip in the House of Lords until 2010. In 2009, Anelay was sworn of the Privy Council.

After the general election, on 12 May 2010, Anelay was appointed Government Chief Whip in the Lords and Captain of the Honourable Corps of Gentlemen-at-Arms.

On 6 August 2014, the day after Baroness Warsi's resignation, Anelay was appointed in Warsi's place as Minister of State for South Asia and the Commonwealth, attending Cabinet (although not as a member). Anelay did not on take on Warsi's faith and communities brief, which reverted to Eric Pickles.

In April 2017, Anelay expressed concerns about reports of homophobia in Chechnya, and she released the following statement: "The detention and ill-treatment of over 100 gay men in Chechnya is extremely concerning. Reports have also suggested that at least three of these men have been killed."

In May 2020, as Chairwoman of the International Relations and Defence Committee in Britain's House of Lords, she questioned whether Israel should continue to receive preferential access to the UK market if the plan for annexing West Bank territory, as laid out in the incoming unity government's coalition agreement, proceeds.

== Personal life ==
Anelay married in 1970, her university contemporary, Richard Anelay, a Deputy High Court Judge, leading family and criminal law barrister, and former head of 1 King's Bench Walk Chambers.

== Arms ==
Coat of arms of Joyce Anelay, Baroness Anelay of St Johns
| Escutcheon Barry of four azure and or five acorns in cross counterchanged. Supporters On either side an angel proper vested argent wings sashed and blowing a trumpet supported by the exterior hand or. |

Party political offices
| Preceded by The Lord Cope of Berkeley | Conservative Chief Whip of the House of Lords; 2007–2014 | Succeeded by The Lord Taylor of Holbeach |
Political offices
| Preceded by The Lord Cope of Berkeley | Shadow Chief Whip of the House of Lords; 2007–2010 | Succeeded by The Lord Bassam of Brighton |
| Preceded by The Lord Bassam of Brighton | Chief Whip in the House of Lords; 2010–2014 | Succeeded by The Lord Taylor of Holbeach |
| Preceded by The Lord Bassam of Brighton | Captain of the Honourable Corps of Gentlemen-at-Arms; 2010–2014 | Succeeded by The Lord Taylor of Holbeach |
| Preceded by The Baroness Warsi | Minister of State for South Asia and the Commonwealth; 2014–2017 | Succeeded by The Lord Ahmad of Wimbledon |
| Preceded by David Jones | Minister of State for Exiting the European Union; 2017 | Succeeded by The Lord Callanan |
