= Captain of the Honourable Corps of Gentlemen-at-Arms =

Government whip in the British House of Lords

Captain of the Honourable Corps of Gentlemen-at-Arms & Government Chief Whip in the House of Lords

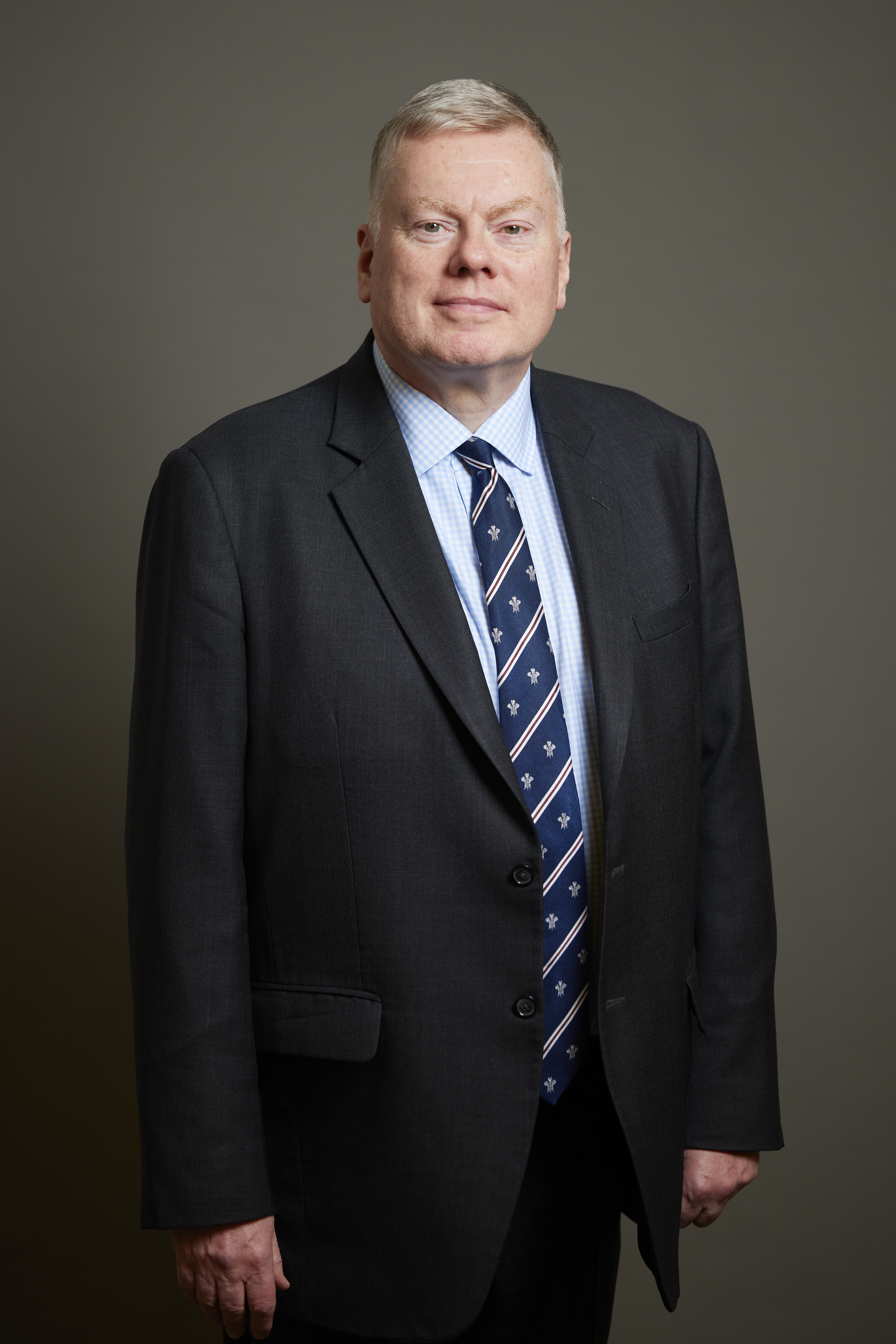
- Incumbent; Roy Kennedy, Baron Kennedy of Southwark since 9 July 2024
- Style: The Right Honourable
- Appointer: Prime Minister
- Formation: 1509
- First holder: Henry Bourchier, 2nd Earl of Essex

The Captain of the Honourable Corps of Gentlemen-at-Arms is a post in the Government of the United Kingdom which has been held by the Government Chief Whip in the House of Lords since 1945. Prior to 17 March 1834, the Gentlemen-at-Arms were known as the Honourable Band of Gentlemen Pensioners.

== List of Captains of the Gentlemen-at-Arms ==
Date of appointment	Holder
1509	Henry Bourchier, 2nd Earl of Essex
1539	Sir Anthony Browne
1549	John Braye, 2nd Baron Braye
1550	William Parr, 1st Marquess of Northampton
1553	Thomas Radclyffe, 3rd Earl of Sussex
1558	Henry Carey, 1st Baron Hunsdon
1596	George Carey, 2nd Baron Hunsdon
May 1603	Henry Percy, 9th Earl of Northumberland
1615	Thomas Howard, 1st Earl of Suffolk
1616	Theophilus Howard, Baron Howard de Walden (succeeded as Earl of Suffolk 1626)
May 1635	William Cecil, 2nd Earl of Salisbury
1643	Francis Leigh, 1st Baron Dunsmore (created Earl of Chichester 1644)
temp Charles II	William Cecil, 2nd Earl of Salisbury
20 July 1660	Thomas Wentworth, 1st Earl of Cleveland
29 March 1667	John Belasyse, 1st Baron Belasyse
10 March 1672	Thomas Belasyse, 2nd Viscount Fauconberg
9 May 1676	Wentworth Dillon, 4th Earl of Roscommon
24 April 1677	Robert Leke, 3rd Earl of Scarsdale
26 June 1682	Theophilus Hastings, 7th Earl of Huntingdon
28 February 1689	John Lovelace, 3rd Baron Lovelace
29 November 1693	Charles Beauclerk, 1st Duke of St Albans
13 January 1712	Henry Somerset, 2nd Duke of Beaufort
22 September 1714	Charles Beauclerk, 1st Duke of St Albans
21 May 1726	William Cavendish, Marquess of Hartington (succeeded as Duke of Devonshire 1729)
11 June 1731	Richard Boyle, 3rd Earl of Burlington
11 June 1734	John Montagu, 2nd Duke of Montagu
8 May 1740	Charles Powlett, 3rd Duke of Bolton
12 July 1742	Allen Bathurst, 1st Earl Bathurst
24 December 1744	John Hobart, 1st Baron Hobart (created Earl of Buckinghamshire 1746)
16 November 1756	John Berkeley, 5th Baron Berkeley of Stratton
12 July 1762	George Henry Lee, 3rd Earl of Lichfield
28 December 1772	George Edgcumbe, 3rd Baron Edgcumbe (created Viscount Mount Edgcumbe and Valletort 1781)
29 March 1782	George Townshend, 17th Baron Ferrers of Chartley
17 May 1783	George Villiers, 4th Earl of Jersey
31 December 1783	George Townshend, 17th Baron Ferrers of Chartley (created Earl of Leicester 1784)
5 March 1790	George Boscawen, 3rd Viscount Falmouth
19 February 1806	St Andrew St John, 14th Baron St John of Bletso
2 March 1808	Richard Edgcumbe, 2nd Earl of Mount Edgcumbe
26 March 1812	James Stopford, 3rd Earl of Courtown
1 September 1827	Henry Devereux, 14th Viscount Hereford
9 December 1830	Thomas Foley, 3rd Baron Foley
16 August 1833	Thomas Foley, 4th Baron Foley
29 December 1834	Henry Devereux, 14th Viscount Hereford
6 May 1835	Thomas Foley, 4th Baron Foley
8 September 1841	John Weld-Forester, 2nd Baron Forester
24 July 1846	Thomas Foley, 4th Baron Fole
27 February 1852	John Montagu, 7th Earl of Sandwich
30 December 1852	Thomas Foley, 4th Baron Foley
26 February 1858	Henry Chetwynd-Talbot, 18th Earl of Shrewsbury
28 June 1859	Thomas Foley, 4th Baron Foley
10 July 1866	Charles Bennet, 6th Earl of Tankerville
20 March 1867	William Cecil, 3rd Marquess of Exeter
12 December 1868	Thomas Foley, 4th Baron Foley
27 December 1869	George Phipps, 2nd Marquess of Normanby
20 April 1871	Francis Cowper, 7th Earl Cowper
1 January 1874	Henry Fox-Strangways, 5th Earl of Ilchester
2 March 1874	William Cecil, 3rd Marquess of Exeter
4 February 1875	Charles Chetwynd-Talbot, 19th Earl of Shrewsbury
28 May 1877	George Coventry, 9th Earl of Coventry
3 May 1880	Alexander Duff, 6th Earl Fife
21 January 1881	Charles Gordon, 11th Marquess of Huntly
27 June 1881	Charles Wynn-Carington, 3rd Baron Carrington
6 July 1885	George Coventry, 9th Earl of Coventry
10 February 1886	Charles Hanbury-Tracy, 4th Baron Sudeley
5 August 1886	George Barrington, 7th Viscount Barrington
24 November 1886	Robert St Clair-Erskine, 4th Earl of Rosslyn
11 August 1890	Charles Pelham, 4th Earl of Yarborough
25 August 1892	George Venables-Vernon, 7th Baron Vernon
13 March 1894	Edwyn Scudamore-Stanhope, 10th Earl of Chesterfield
16 July 1895	Henry Strutt, 2nd Baron Belper
18 December 1905	William Lygon, 7th Earl Beauchamp
31 July 1907	Thomas Denman, 3rd Baron Denman
26 June 1911	Edward Colebrooke, 1st Baron Colebrooke
20 November 1922	George Villiers, 6th Earl of Clarendon
22 January 1924	Alexander Murray, 8th Earl of Dunmore
1 December 1924	George Villiers, 6th Earl of Clarendon
26 June 1925	Ivor Windsor-Clive, 2nd Earl of Plymouth
1 January 1929	George Bingham, 5th Earl of Lucan
5 June 1929	Rudolph Lambart, 10th Earl of Cavan
12 November 1931	George Bingham, 5th Earl of Lucan
31 May 1940	Henry Snell, 1st Baron Snell
21 April 1944	Vacant
22 March 1945	Hugh Fortescue, 5th Earl Fortescue
4 August 1945	Charles Ammon, 1st Baron Ammon
18 October 1949	George Shepherd, 1st Baron Shepherd
5 November 1951	Hugh Fortescue, 5th Earl Fortescue
27 June 1957	Michael Hicks Beach, 2nd Earl St Aldwyn
21 October 1964	Malcolm Shepherd, 2nd Baron Shepherd
29 July 1967	Frank Beswick, Baron Beswick
24 June 1970	Michael Hicks Beach, 2nd Earl St Aldwynn
11 March 1974	Annie Llewelyn-Davies, Baroness Llewelyn-Davies of Hastoe
6 May 1979	Bertram Bowyer, 2nd Baron Denham
22 May 1991	Alexander Fermor-Hesketh, 3rd Baron Hesketh
16 September 1993	Nicholas Lowther, 2nd Viscount Ullswater
20 July 1994	Thomas Galbraith, 2nd Baron Strathclyde
6 May 1997	Denis Carter, Baron Carter
1 May 2002	Bruce Grocott, Baron Grocott
24 January 2008	Janet Royall, Baroness Royall of Blaisdon
5 October 2008	Steve Bassam, Baron Bassam of Brighton
13 May 2010	Joyce Anelay, Baroness Anelay of St John's
6 August 2014	John Taylor, Baron Taylor of Holbeach
26 July 2019	Henry Ashton, 4th Baron Ashton of Hyde
7 September 2022	Susan Williams, Baroness Williams of Trafford
9 July 2024	Roy Kennedy, Baron Kennedy of Southwark
