= List of government ministers of the United Kingdom =

The following is a list of ministerial offices in the Government of the United Kingdom. The highest ranking ministers are Cabinet ministers or also attend Cabinet.

== Prime Minister's Office ==
- Prime Minister (joint with the HM Treasury – the prime minister is the First Lord of the Treasury ex officio) (Note: The Prime Minister has concurrently served as First Lord of the Treasury since 1902, Minister for the Civil Service since 1968 and Minister for the Union since 2019.)
- First Lord of the Treasury
- First Secretary of State
- Minister for the Civil Service
- Minister for the Union
- Parliamentary Private Secretary to the Prime Minister

=== Former positions ===
- Deputy Prime Minister

==== Deputy Prime Minister's Office ====
- Minister Assisting the Deputy Prime Minister (joint with Cabinet Office)

== Cabinet Office ==
- Minister for the Cabinet Office
- Chancellor of the Duchy of Lancaster
- Minister without Portfolio
- Paymaster General (joint with HM Treasury)
- Minister of State without Portfolio
- Minister of State at the Cabinet Office
- Minister of State (Minister for Artificial Intelligence) (jointly with the Department for Business, Innovation, Science and Trade)
- Parliamentary Secretary for the Cabinet Office
- Parliamentary Under-Secretary of State for the Investment Security Unit

=== Government Equalities Office ===
- Minister for Women and Equalities
- Parliamentary Under-Secretary of State for Equalities
- Parliamentary Under Secretary of State for Women

=== Former positions ===
==== Cabinet Office ====
- Chief Secretary to the Prime Minister
- President of the COP26 Climate Change Conference
- Minister of State at the Office of Public Service
- Minister for the Northern Powerhouse and Local Growth
- Minister of State for Government Policy
- Minister of State for the Third Sector
- Minister for Digital Engagement and Civil Service Issues
- Minister Assisting the Deputy Prime Minister (joint with Deputy Prime Minister's Office)
- Parliamentary Secretary for Implementation
- Minister for Social Exclusion
- Minister of State for the Constitution and Devolution (Minister of State at the Cabinet Office)
- Minister of State for Efficiency and Transformation (Minister of State at the Cabinet Office) (joint with HM Treasury)
- Minister of State for EU Relations (Minister of State at the Cabinet Office)

==== Government Equalities Office ====
- Minister for Women and Equalities
- Deputy Minister for Women (Second Blair ministry)

== Defence ==
=== Ministry of Defence ===
- Secretary of State for Defence
- Minister of State for the Armed Forces
- Minister of State for Defence Procurement
- Minister of State for Defence
- Parliamentary Under-Secretary of State for Veterans and People

=== Former positions ===
- Secretary of State for Air
- Secretary of State for War and the Colonies
- First Lord of the Admiralty
- Treasurer of the Navy

==== Ministry of Defence ====
- Minister of Defence for the Royal Navy
- Minister of State for Defence Equipment and Support
- Minister of Defence for Equipment
- Minister of State for Strategic Defence Acquisition Reform
- Minister of State for International Defence and Security
- Parliamentary Under-Secretary of State for International Security Strategy
- Parliamentary Under-Secretary of State for Reserves
- Under-Secretary of State for the Navy

==== National Government/War Cabinet Ministers ====
- Minister of War Production
- Minister of Aircraft Production
- Minister of Supply
- Minister-Resident for the Middle East
- Minister of Reconstruction (also WW1)
- Minister of Munitions
- Minister of Defence
- Minister for Co-ordination of Defence
- Parliamentary Secretary to the Ministry of Munitions
- Parliamentary and Financial Secretary to the Ministry of Munitions

==== War Office ====
- Secretary of State for War
- Secretary at War (occasionally Cabinet position)
- Under-Secretary of State for War
- Financial Secretary to the War Office
- Paymaster-General of the Forces

== Treasury ==
=== His Majesty's Treasury ===
- First Lord of the Treasury (joint with the Prime Minister's Office)
- Chancellor of the Exchequer
- Second Lord of the Treasury
- Chief Secretary to the Treasury
- Paymaster General (joint with the Cabinet Office)
- Financial Secretary to the Treasury
- Economic Secretary to the Treasury (City Minister)
- Exchequer Secretary to the Treasury
- Minister of State for Efficiency and Transformation (Minister of State for the Treasury) (joint with the Cabinet Office)

=== Former positions ===
- Commercial Secretary to the Treasury
- Financial Services Secretary to the Treasury (City Minister)
- Minister of State for Revenue Protection at the Border (Minister of State for the Treasury)
- Minister of State for Trade and Competitiveness in Europe (joint with Trade and Industry)

==== Department of Economic Affairs ====
- Secretary of State for Economic Affairs
- Minister of State for Economic Affairs
- Under-Secretary of State for Economic Affairs

== Foreign Affairs ==
=== Foreign, Commonwealth and Development Office ===
- Secretary of State for Foreign, Commonwealth and Development Affairs
- Minister of State for Middle East and North Africa
- Minister of State for Pacific and the Environment (joint with DEFRA)
- Minister of State for Asia
- Minister of State for South Asia and the Commonwealth
- Parliamentary Under-Secretary of State for Africa
- Parliamentary Under-Secretary of State for European Neighbourhood and the Americas
- Parliamentary Under-Secretary of State for Overseas Territories and Sustainable Development

=== Former positions ===
- Secretary of State for Foreign and Commonwealth Affairs
- Secretary of State for the Northern Department
- Secretary of State for the Colonies
- Secretary of State for Commonwealth Affairs
- Secretary of State for Commonwealth Relations
- Secretary of State for Dominion Affairs
- Deputy Secretary of State for Foreign Affairs (Heath)
- Minister of State for International Energy Strategy
- Minister of State for the Middle East
- Minister of State for Commonwealth Affairs
- Minister of State for Commonwealth Relations
- Minister of State for Foreign Affairs
- Minister of State for Foreign and Commonwealth Affairs
- Parliamentary Under-Secretary of State for Asia and the Pacific
- Parliamentary Under-Secretary of State for the Colonies
- Under-Secretary of State for the Colonies
- Under-Secretary of State for the Northern Department
- Chief Mouser to the Foreign & Commonwealth Office

==== India Office and Burma Office ====
- Secretary of State for India
- President of the Board of Control
- Secretary of State for India and Burma
- Secretary of State for Burma

==== Department for Exiting the European Union ====
- Secretary of State for Exiting the European Union
- Minister of State for Exiting the European Union
- Parliamentary Under-Secretary of State for Exiting the European Union

==== Department for International Development ====
- Secretary of State for International Development
- Minister of State for International Development
- Parliamentary Under-Secretary of State for Syrian Refugees (joint with Communities and Home Office)

== Justice ==
=== Ministry of Justice ===
- Secretary of State for Justice (Note: Secretary of State for Justice and Lord Chancellor have been held jointly since 2007.)
- Lord Chancellor
- Minister of State for Crime, Policing and the Fire Service (joint with the Home Office)
- Minister of State for Prisons and Probation
- Parliamentary Under-Secretary of State for Justice
- Parliamentary Under Secretary of State for Immigration Compliance and the Courts (joint with the Home Office)

=== Former positions ===
==== Ministry of Justice ====
- Minister of State for Prisons
- Minister of State for Civil Justice and Legal Policy
- Minister for Young Citizens and Youth Engagement (joint with Education)
- Parliamentary Under-Secretary of State for Prisons and Youth Justice
- Parliamentary Under-Secretary of State for Human Rights

==== Department for Constitutional Affairs ====
- Secretary of State for Constitutional Affairs
- Parliamentary Under-Secretary of State for Constitutional Affairs

==== Lord Chancellor's Department ====
- Minister of State for the Lord Chancellor's Department
- Parliamentary Under-Secretary for the Lord Chancellor's Department

== Home Affairs ==
=== Home Office ===
- Secretary of State for the Home Department
- Deputy Home Secretary
- Minister of State for Security
- Minister of State for Crime, Policing and the Fire Service (joint with Justice)
- Minister of State for Countering Extremism (joint with GEO)
- Minister of State for Building Safety and Communities (joint with Communities)
- Parliamentary Under-Secretary of State for Crime, Safeguarding and Vulnerability
- Parliamentary Under-Secretary of State for Immigration and Future Borders
- Parliamentary Under-Secretary of State for Immigration Compliance and Courts (joint with Justice)

=== Former positions ===
==== Home Office ====
- Minister of State for Asylum and Immigration
- Minister of State for Home Affairs
- Minister of State for Security and Economic Crime
- Minister of State for Modern Slavery and Organised Crime
- Minister of State for Security and Counter-Terrorism
- Parliamentary Under-Secretary of State for Syrian Refugees (joint with Communities and International Development)

== Health ==
=== Department of Health and Social Care ===
- Secretary of State for Health and Social Care
- Minister of State for Health
- Minister of State for Social Care
- Minister of State for Mental Health, Suicide Prevention and Patient Safety
- Parliamentary Under-Secretary of State for Prevention, Public Health and Primary Care
- Parliamentary Under-Secretary of State for COVID-19 Vaccine Deployment
- Parliamentary Under-Secretary of State for Innovation

=== Former positions ===
==== Department of Health ====
- Secretary of State for Health
- Parliamentary Under-Secretary of State for Quality

==== Department of Health and Social Care ====
- Minister of State for Care and Mental Health

== Business and Trade ==
=== Department for Business and Trade ===
- Secretary of State for Business and Trade (Note: Secretary of State for Business and Trade and President of the Board of Trade have been held jointly since 2023.)
- President of the Board of Trade
- Minister of State for Industry
- Minister of State for Investment
- Minister of State for Trade Policy and Economic Security
- Minister of State (Minister for Artificial Intelligence) (jointly with the Cabinet Office)
- Parliamentary Under-Secretary of State for Employment Rights, Competition and Markets
- Parliamentary Under-Secretary of State for Legislation
- Parliamentary Under-Secretary of State for Services, Small Business and Exports

=== Former positions ===
==== Department for Business, Energy and Industrial Strategy ====
- Secretary of State for Business, Energy and Industrial Strategy
- Minister of State for Business, Energy and Clean Growth
- Minister of State for Universities, Science, Research and Innovation
- Minister of State for Decentralisation and Planning
- Parliamentary Under-Secretary of State for Business and Industry
- Parliamentary Under Secretary of State for Science, Research and Innovation
- Parliamentary Under-Secretary of State for Climate Change and Corporate Responsibility
- Parliamentary Under-Secretary of State for Small Business, Consumers and Corporate Responsibility
- Parliamentary Under-Secretary of State for Climate Change

==== Department for International Trade ====
- Secretary of State for International Trade
- Parliamentary Under-Secretary of State for International Trade

==== Department for Business, Innovation and Skills ====
- Secretary of State for Business, Innovation and Skills

==== Department for Business, Enterprise and Regulatory Reform ====
- Secretary of State for Business, Enterprise and Regulatory Reform

==== Department of Trade and Industry ====
- Secretary of State for Trade and Industry
- Minister of State for Trade and Industry

== Science ==
=== Department for Science, Innovation and Technology ===
- Secretary of State for Science, Innovation and Technology
- Minister of State for Science, Innovation, Research and Nuclear
- Minister of State for Digital Government and Data
- Parliamentary Under-Secretary of State for AI and Online Safety
- Parliamentary Under-Secretary of State for Digital Economy

=== Former positions ===
==== Department for Innovation, Universities and Skills ====
- Secretary of State for Innovation, Universities and Skills

==== Ministry of Technology ====
- Minister of Technology
- Minister of State for Technology
- Parliamentary Secretary to the Ministry of Technology

== Energy ==
=== Department for Energy Security and Net Zero ===
- Secretary of State for Energy Security and Net Zero
- Minister of State for Energy
- Minister of State for Energy and Net Zero

=== Former positions ===
==== Department of Energy and Climate Change ====
- Secretary of State for Energy and Climate Change

==== Department of Energy ====
- Secretary of State for Energy

== Education ==
=== Department for Education (2010–present) ===
- Secretary of State for Education
- Minister of State for School Standards
- Minister of State for Universities
- Parliamentary Under-Secretary of State for Children and Families
- Parliamentary Under-Secretary of State for Apprenticeships and Skills
- Parliamentary Under-Secretary of State for the School System

=== Former positions ===
==== Department for Education (2010–present) ====
- Parliamentary Under-Secretary of State for 14-19 Reform and Apprenticeships

==== Department for Children, Schools and Families (2007–2010) ====
- Secretary of State for Children, Schools and Families
- Minister for Young Citizens and Youth Engagement (joint with Justice)

==== Department for Education and Skills (2001–2007) ====
- Secretary of State for Education and Skills

== Work and Pensions ==
=== Department for Work and Pensions ===
- Secretary of State for Work and Pensions
- Minister of State for Disabled People, Health and Work
- Parliamentary Under-Secretary of State for Pensions and Financial Inclusion
- Parliamentary Under-Secretary of State for Welfare Delivery
- Parliamentary Under-Secretary of State for Employment
- Parliamentary Under-Secretary of State for Work and Pensions

=== Former positions ===
==== Department of Social Security ====
- Secretary of State for Social Security
- Parliamentary Under-Secretary of State for Social Security

==== Department for Work and Pensions ====
- Minister of State for Pensions and Child Maintenance
- Minister of State for Welfare Reform

== Environment ==
=== Department for Environment, Food and Rural Affairs ===
- Secretary of State for Environment, Food and Rural Affairs
- Minister of State for Pacific and the Environment (joint with FCDO)
- Parliamentary Under-Secretary of State for Agriculture, Fisheries and Food
- Parliamentary Under-Secretary of State for Environment and Rural Opportunities
- Parliamentary Under-Secretary of State for Rural Affairs and Biosecurity

=== Former positions ===
- Minister of State for Environment and Countryside

== Transport ==
=== Department for Transport ===
- Secretary of State for Transport
- Minister of State for Transport
- Minister of State for Rail
- Minister of State for High Speed 2
- Parliamentary Under-Secretary of State for Transport
- Parliamentary Under-Secretary of State for Roads and Light Rail
- Parliamentary Under-Secretary of State for Aviation and Maritime
- Parliamentary Under-Secretary of State for Future of Transport

=== Former positions ===
- Minister for Public Transport
- Minister for Railways and Roads
- Under-Secretary of State for Transport

== Culture ==
=== Department for Digital, Culture, Media and Sport ===
- Secretary of State for Digital, Culture, Media and Sport
- Minister of State for Creative Industries, Media and Arts
- Parliamentary Under-Secretary of State for Sport, Media, Civil Society and Youth
- Parliamentary Under-Secretary of State for Museums, Heritage and Gambling

=== Former positions ===
- Secretary of State for National Heritage

==== Department for Digital, Culture, Media and Sport ====
- Minister of State for Digital and Culture
- Minister of State for Media and Data
- Minister of State for Sport, Media and Creative Industries
- Parliamentary Under-Secretary of State for Civil Society and Digital, Media Culture and Sport
- Parliamentary Under-Secretary of State for Arts, Heritage and Tourism
- Parliamentary Under-Secretary of State for Digital and Broadband
- Parliamentary Under-Secretary of State for Digital Infrastructure
- Parliamentary Under Secretary of State, Minister for Sport, Tourism and Heritage
- Minister of State for Communications (joint with Business)
- Minister of State for the Millennium

==== Post Office ====
- Postmaster General of the United Kingdom

== Local and devolved government ==
=== Ministry of Housing, Communities and Local Government ===
- Secretary of State for Housing, Communities and Local Government
- Minister of State for Housing
- Minister of State for Regional Growth and Local Government
- Minister of State for London
- Minister of State for Building Safety and Communities
- Parliamentary Under-Secretary of State for Rough Sleeping and Housing

=== Northern Ireland Office ===
- Secretary of State for Northern Ireland
- Minister of State for Northern Ireland
- Parliamentary Under-Secretary of State for Northern Ireland

=== Scotland Office ===
- Secretary of State for Scotland
- Parliamentary Under-Secretary of State for Scotland

=== Wales Office ===
- Secretary of State for Wales
- Parliamentary Under-Secretary of State for Wales

=== Former positions ===
==== Ministry of Housing, Communities and Local Government ====
- Minister of State for the Northern Powerhouse and Local Growth (joint with Cabinet Office)
- Minister of State for Portsmouth
- Minister of State for Communities and Resilience
- Parliamentary Under-Secretary of State for Faith and Communities
- Parliamentary Under-Secretary of State for Syrian Refugees (joint with International Development and Home Office)

== Parliamentary leadership ==
=== House of Commons ===
- Leader of the House of Commons
- Deputy Leader of the House of Commons

=== House of Lords ===
- Leader of the House of Lords
- Deputy Leader of the House of Lords

== Whips ==
=== House of Commons ===
- Parliamentary Secretary to the Treasury (Chief Whip)
- Treasurer of His Majesty's Household (Deputy Chief Whip)
- Comptroller of His Majesty's Household
- Vice-Chamberlain of His Majesty's Household
- Junior Lord of the Treasury/Lords Commissioners of the Treasury
- Assistant Government Whip

=== House of Lords ===
- Captain of the Honourable Corps of Gentlemen at Arms (Chief Whip)
- Captain of the King's Bodyguard of the Yeoman of the Guard (Deputy Chief Whip)
- Baronesses and Lords in waiting (Lords Whips)

== Law officers ==
- Attorney General for England and Wales (Note: The Attorney General for England and Wales has concurrently served as Advocate General for Northern Ireland since 2010.)
- Advocate General for Scotland
- Advocate General for Northern Ireland
- Solicitor General for England and Wales

=== Former positions ===
- Attorney-General for Ireland
- Solicitor-General for Ireland

== Sinecures ==
- Lord President of the Council
- Lord Keeper of the Privy Seal
