= 1998 Special Honours =

British government recognitions

As part of the British honours system, Special Honours are issued at the Monarch's pleasure at any given time. The Special Honours refer to the awards made within royal prerogative, operational honours and other honours awarded outside the New Years Honours and Birthday Honours

== Life peer ==
=== Baronesses ===
- Peta June Buscombe to be Baroness Buscombe of Goring in the county of Oxfordshire.
- Christine Crawley to be Baroness Crawley of Edgbaston in the county of West Midlands.
- Susan Elizabeth Miller to be Baroness Miller of Chilthorne Domer, of Chilthorne Domer in the County of Somerset.
- Dorothea Glenys Thornton to be Baroness Thornton of Manningham in the county of West Yorkshire.

=== Barons ===
- Sir Timothy John Leigh Bell, Knight, to be Baron Bell, of Belgravia in the City of Westminster.
- Melvyn Bragg to be of Baron Bragg, of Wigton in the County of Cumbria.
- David Keith Brookman to be Baron Brookman, of Ebbw Vale in the County of Gwent.
- Anthony Martin Grosvenor Christopher, C.B.E., to be Baron Christopher, of Leckhampton in the County of Gloucestershire.
- Anthony James Clarke, C.B.E. to be Baron Clarke of Hampstead, of Hampstead in the London Borough of Camden.
- David Charles Evans to be Baron Evans of Watford, of Chipperfield in the County of Hertfordshire.
- Jonathan Toby Harris to be Baron Harris of Haringey, of Hornsey in the London Borough of Haringey.
- Christopher Robin Haskins to be Baron Haskins of Skidby in the county of the East Riding of Yorkshire.
- Norman Stewart Hughson Lamont to be Baron Lamont of Lerwick, of Lerwick in the Shetland Islands.
- Andrew Wyndham Phillips, O.B.E. to be Baron Phillips of Sudbury of Sudbury in the county of Suffolk.
- Lawrence Sawyer to be Baron Sawyer, of Darlington in the County of Durham.
- Norman Reginald Warner to be Baron Warner, of Brockley in the London Borough of Lewisham.
- Paul Edward Winston White to be Baron Hanningfield, of Chelmsford in the County of Essex.
