= Lucy Neville-Rolfe =

British businesswoman and peer (born 1953)

The Right Honourable The Baroness Neville-Rolfe DBE CMG
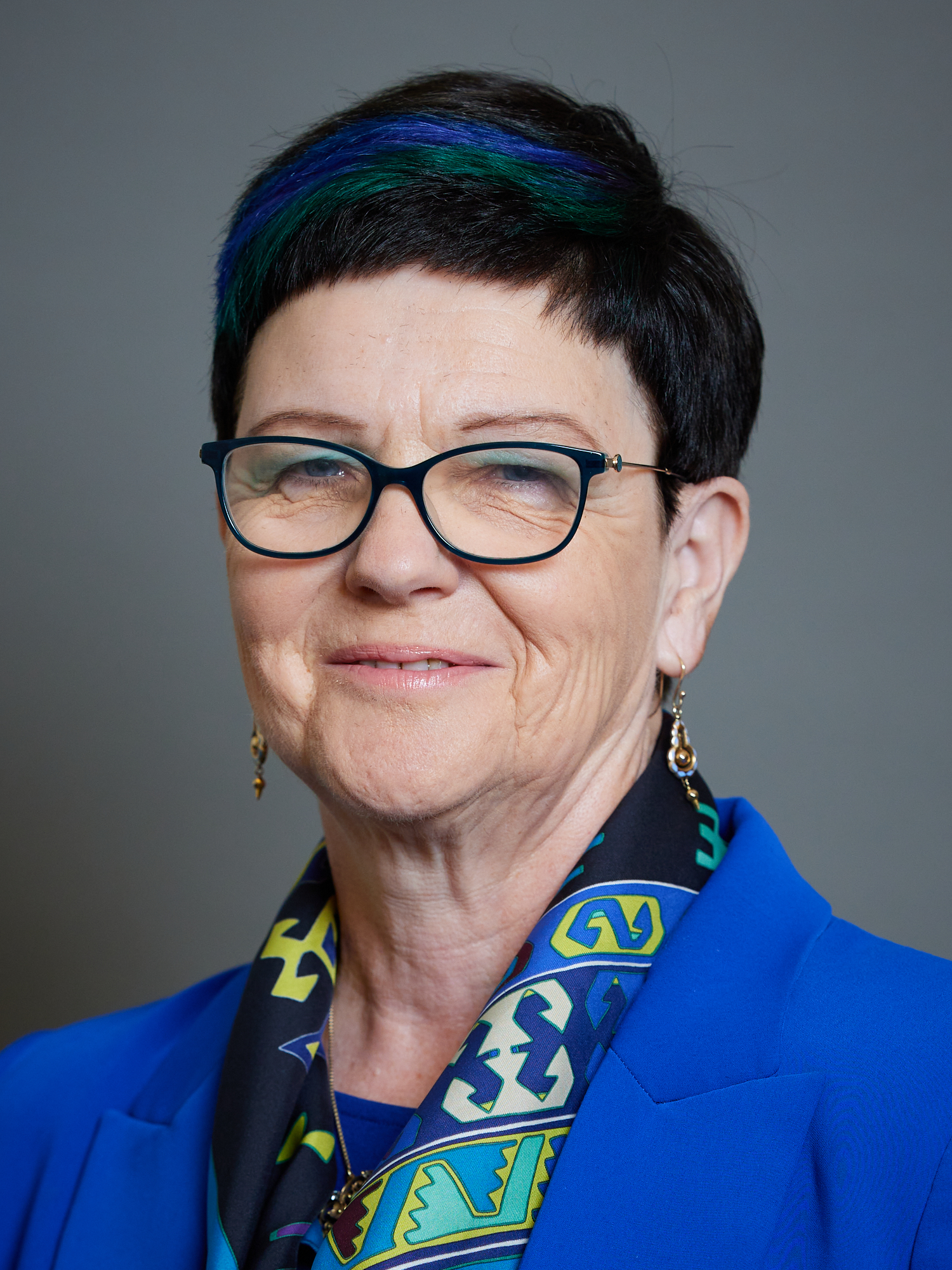
- Official portrait, 2022

Shadow Minister for the Treasury
- Incumbent
- Assumed office 11 November 2024
- Leader: Kemi Badenoch
- Preceded by: The Baroness Vere of Norbiton

Minister of State at the Cabinet Office
- In office 20 September 2022 – 5 July 2024
- Prime Minister: Liz Truss; Rishi Sunak
- Preceded by: The Lord True
- Succeeded by: Douglas Alexander (2025)

Chair of Assured Food Standards
- In office 21 November 2017 – 26 October 2020
- Prime Minister: Theresa May; Boris Johnson
- Preceded by: Andrew Blenkiron
- Succeeded by: Christine Tacon

Commercial Secretary to the Treasury
- In office 21 December 2016 – 13 June 2017
- Prime Minister: Theresa May
- Preceded by: The Lord O'Neill of Gatley
- Succeeded by: The Lord Agnew of Oulton (Note: As Minister of State for the Treasury.)

Minister of State for Energy and Intellectual Property
- In office 18 July 2016 – 21 December 2016
- Prime Minister: Theresa May
- Preceded by: Andrea Leadsom
- Succeeded by: Nick Hurd

Parliamentary Under-Secretary of State for Intellectual Property
- In office 15 July 2014 – 13 July 2016
- Prime Minister: David Cameron
- Preceded by: The Viscount Younger of Leckie
- Succeeded by: Office abolished

Member of the House of Lords
- Lord Temporal
- Life peerage 10 September 2013

Personal details
- Born: 2 January 1953 (age 73) Wardour, Wiltshire, England, UK
- Party: Conservative
- Spouse: Sir Richard Packer
- Children: 4 sons
- Education: Somerville College, Oxford

Lucy Jeanne Neville-Rolfe, Baroness Neville-Rolfe DBE CMG (born 2 January 1953) is a British businesswoman and politician who served as Minister of State at the Cabinet Office from September 2022 to July 2024. A member of the Conservative Party, she served in ministerial positions under prime ministers David Cameron, Theresa May, Liz Truss, and Rishi Sunak. In December 2021, she was appointed by the secretary of state for work and pensions to lead the statutory review into the state pension age.

Born in Wiltshire, Neville-Rolfe worked as a senior civil servant at the Ministry of Agriculture, Fisheries and Food from 1973 to 1992, and at the Prime Minister's Policy Unit at 10 Downing Street from 1992 to 1994. She then worked at Tesco (1997–2013), serving on the board of directors from 2006.

Neville-Rolfe was appointed a life peer in the House of Lords in 2013. She served in the first government of Theresa May as Minister of State for Energy and Intellectual Property at the Department for Business, Energy and Industrial Strategy from July to December 2016 and as Commercial Secretary to the Treasury from 2016 to 2017. She became chair of Assured Food Standards in November 2017, stepping down in 2020. She joined the shadow frontbench under Kemi Badenoch in November 2024.

== Early life ==
Neville-Rolfe was born at Wardour, Wiltshire, to the agricultural economist and artist Edmund Neville-Rolfe and Margaret Elizabeth (née Evans). She grew up on a farm at Wardour with her parents and four siblings. She attended Catholic convent schools before studying philosophy, politics and economics at Somerville College, Oxford. She graduated with a BA degree, which was later promoted to an MA degree. She is an Honorary Fellow of the college.

== Career ==
After leaving university, Neville-Rolfe worked in the Civil Service. She worked at the Ministry for Agriculture, Fisheries and Food from 1973 to 1992. During John Major's tenure as prime minister, she was a member of the Prime Minister's Policy Unit from 1992 to 1994 and the director of the Deregulation Unit in the Cabinet Office from 1995 to 1997.

After the Conservatives were defeated in the 1997 election, Neville-Rolfe left politics and took up a position at Tesco and served as group director of corporate affairs from 1997 to 2006. She served as company secretary from 2004 to 2006. She served on the board from 2006 as executive director (corporate and legal affairs) until she retired in January 2013. While at Tesco the company moved from its core UK grocery roots into non-food services – and 13 overseas markets across the world.

National Life Stories conducted an oral history interview (C1087/15) with Neville-Rolfe in 2005–2008 for its Tesco: An Oral History collection held by the British Library.

Neville-Rolfe joined the House of Lords as a Conservative Peer in October 2013 and served as Parliamentary Under Secretary of State at the Department for Business, Innovation and Skills and Minister for Intellectual Property from July 2014 until July 2016. From May 2015 she was also Parliamentary Under Secretary of State at the Department for Culture, Media and Sport. Neville-Rolfe was appointed Minister of State at the Department for Business, Energy and Industrial Strategy on 17 July 2016.

Before assuming her ministerial responsibilities she spoke in the House of Lords on business, vocational education, broadband, regulatory reform and competitiveness issues. Neville-Rolfe is a particularly prominent speaker on issues concerning business. The aim is to encourage government to facilitate and support UK businesses, to remove unnecessary tax and regulatory burdens, to roll-out broadband across the UK and to enable the growth of small businesses. She has also delivered speeches on UK foreign trade agreements, with particular interest in China and India. She also sat on the Parliamentary All-Party Parliamentary Group for Affordable Childcare.

Neville-Rolfe had many non-executive positions which she resigned on appointment. She was a non-executive director of ITV Plc and a member of the supervisory board of Metro Group, a large German-based international retailer and wholesaler. Neville-Rolfe was also President of EuroCommerce, the pan-European retail trade association, and sat on the boards of 2 Sisters Food Group and Hermes Equity Ownership Services and on PwC's Advisory Board. She is a former member of the London Business School's governing body.

After leaving government, Neville-Rolfe took up a number of non-political private and public sector roles. In 2019, she became chair of the UKASEAN Business Council. In December 2020, she was appointed chairman of the Crown Agents. She also took up roles as a non-executive director of Capita PLC and as a non-executive director of Secure Trust Bank and Thomson Reuters Founders Share Company.

In December 2021, the Secretary of State for Work and Pensions, Thérèse Coffey, appointed her to lead the government's review into the state pension age.

In September 2022, she returned to government and resigned from her other roles, having been appointed Minister of State at the Cabinet Office by Prime Minister Liz Truss. She was subsequently reappointed to the position by Truss' successor, Rishi Sunak, in October 2022. She was appointed Shadow Minister for the Treasury under Kemi Badenoch in November 2024.

== Honours and awards ==
Neville-Rolfe was appointed a Companion of the Order of St Michael and St George (CMG) in the 2005 Birthday Honours for services to the Foreign and Commonwealth Office Board of Management, and a Dame Commander of the Order of the British Empire (DBE) in the 2012 Birthday Honours for services to industry and voluntary service. On 10 September 2013 she was created a life peer taking the title Baroness Neville-Rolfe, of Chilmark in the County of Wiltshire.

== Personal life ==
Neville-Rolfe is married to Sir Richard Packer, who was Permanent Secretary at the Ministry of Agriculture, Fisheries and Food from 1993 until 2000. They have four sons. Her husband was knighted in 2001. From 2001 until she entered the House of Lords in 2013, her title was Lady Packer.
