= All-Party Parliamentary Humanist Group =

UK parliamentary group

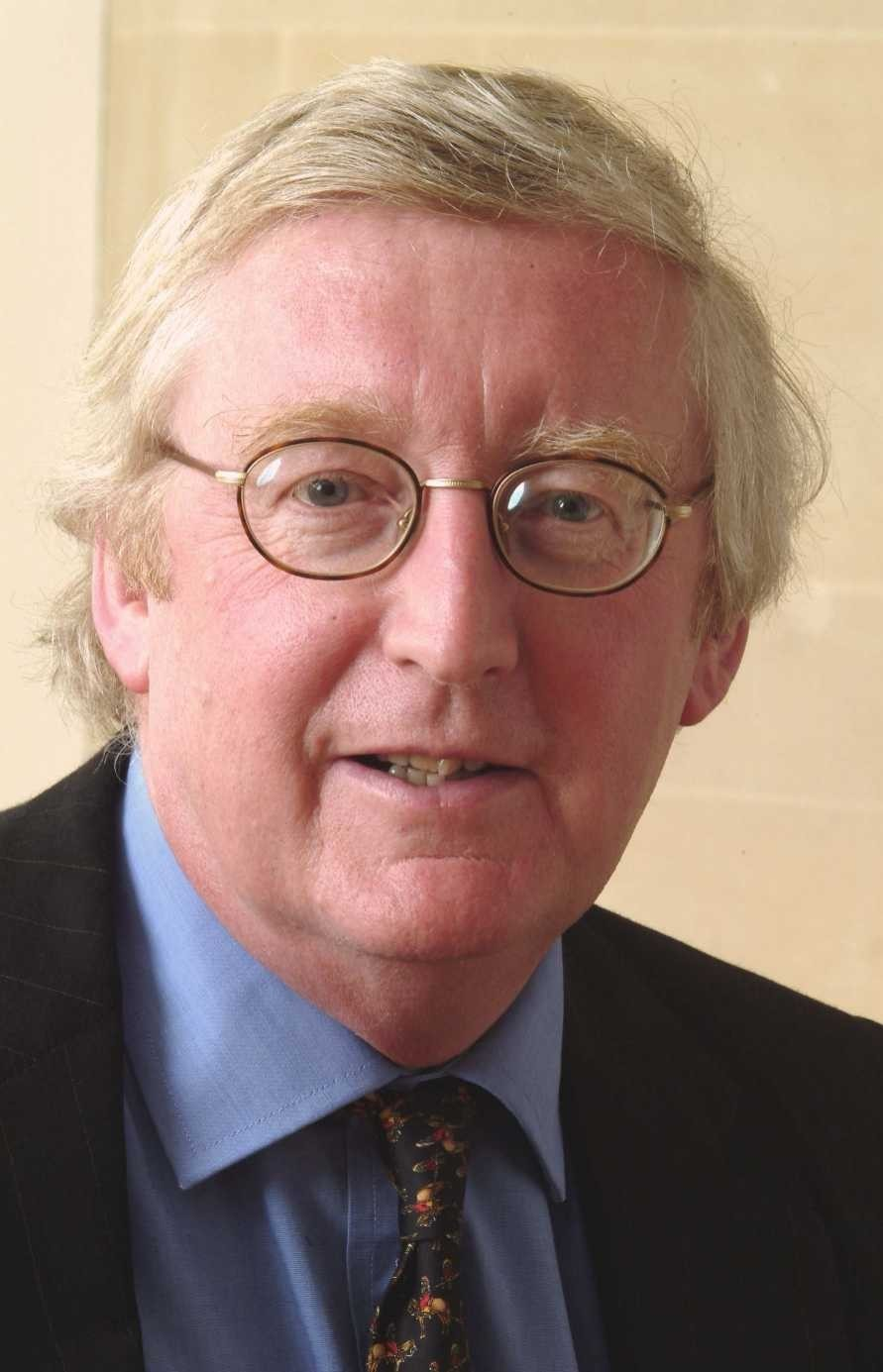
Lord Warner, Vice Chair and former Chair of the APPHG

All-Party Groups (APGs) within United Kingdom politics are informal, cross-party, interest groups of the UK Parliament. APGs have at least 20 members who are all Members of the House of Commons and House of Lords. The All-Party Parliamentary Humanist Group (APPHG) is a subject group of the APG whose purpose is to bring together non-religious humanist, atheist and agnostic MPs and peers to discuss matters of shared interest.

== History ==
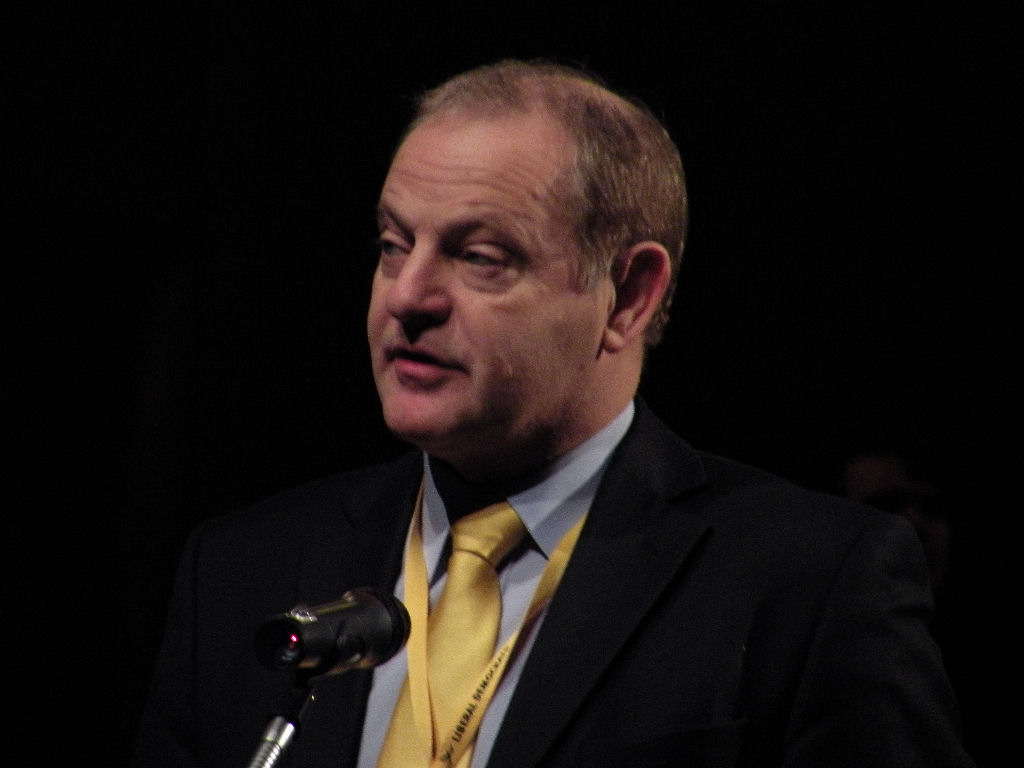
Ian Swales MP

The APPHG first took shape in the mid-late 1960s. In 1968, its earliest members were Leo Abse, Austen Albu, Bessie Braddock, James Dickens, Edward Fletcher, Michael Foot, William Hamling, John Horner, Peter Jackson (Secretary), Lena Jeger, Hugh Jenkins, David Kerr (Chairman), Ian Mikardo, Maurice Miller, Stan Newens, Reginald Paget, Arthur Palmer, John Parker, Renee Short, Brian Walden, Lord (Fenner) Brockway, Lord Chorley, Lord Francis-Williams, Lord Listowel, Lord Raglan, Lord Ritchie-Calder, and Lord Willis.

The group's membership was heavily involved in several successful progressive campaigns of the 1960s, which culminated in the decriminalisation of homosexuality and abortion.

By 1996 it had 47 members. From the 2010s to present, it has had over 100. Although the Group is not part of, nor affiliated to, Humanists UK (formerly called the British Humanist Association), the organisation does provide the secretariat.

== Topics discussed ==
The Group meets around four times a year to hear speakers and discuss relevant issues, as well as to share information and receive briefings on matters of interest. These matters are wide-ranging and include the promotion of a rational approach to bioethical, medical, and scientific issues, the defence of free speech, civil liberties and education.

== Officers and members ==
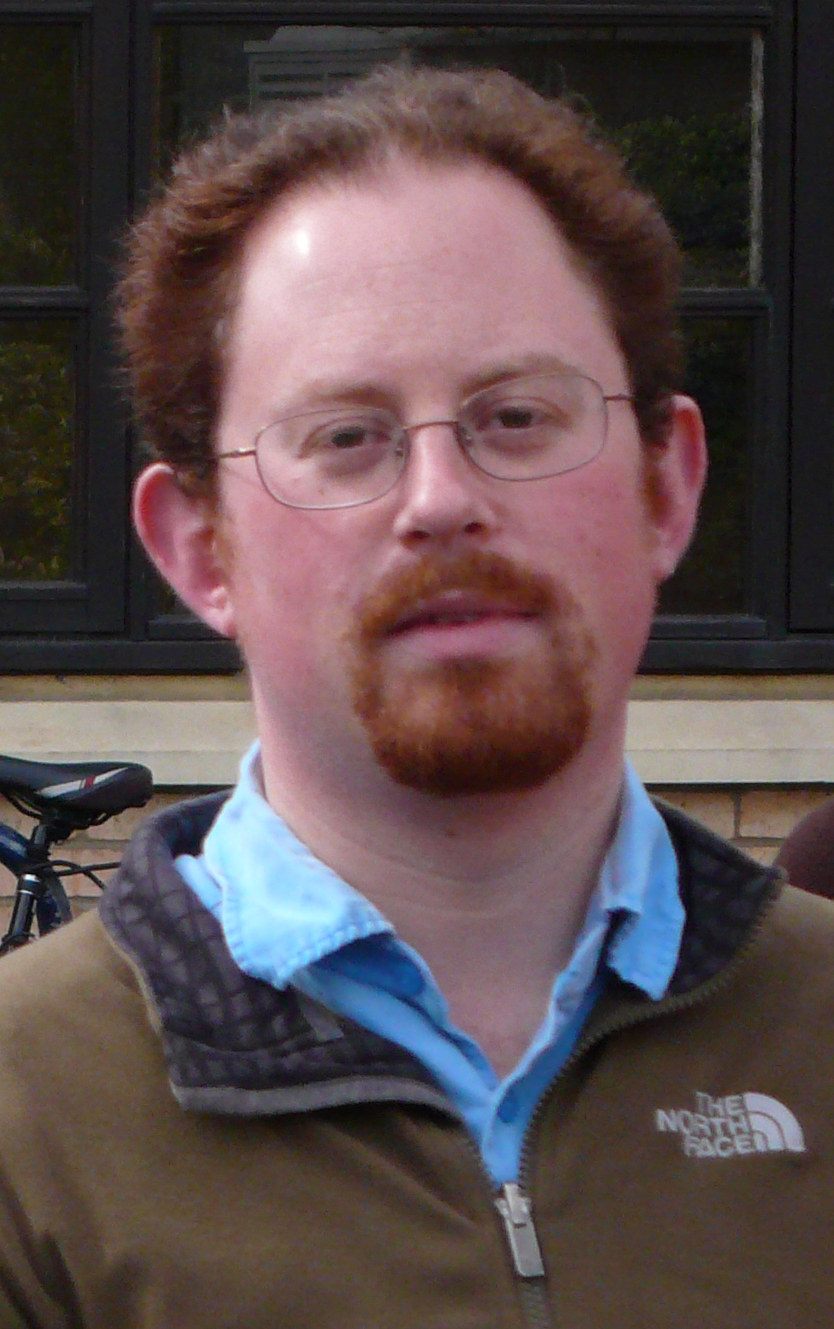
Julian Huppert, former MP and former APPHG Vice Chair

Since September 2025, the officers of the APPHG have been Chair Lizzi Collinge MP (Labour), Vice Chairs Baroness Burt (Liberal Democrat) and Sian Berry (Green), and Secretary Kieran Mullan MP (Conservative).

The total membership of the group exceeds 100. Former members and officers have included Michael Connarty, Julian Huppert, Ian Swales, Colin Challen, Crispin Blunt, Lynne Jones, Evan Harris, Paul Holmes, Sandra Gidley, Tommy Sheppard, Joan Bakewell, Aaron Bell, Clive Lewis, Ruth Cadbury, Jeff Smith MP, Lloyd Russell-Moyle MP, Lord Warner of Brockley, Lord Taverne of Pimlico, Baroness Massey of Darwen, Baroness Flather of Windsor and Maidenhead, Lord Dubs of Battersea, William Goodhart, Joel Joffe, and Rhodri Morgan, later First Minister of Wales.

== Notable debates ==
=== April 2007 – Religion: Non-believers ===
Thursday 19 April 2007 debate Religion: Non-Believer in House of Lords lasted two and a half hours. Lord Harrison called to attention the position in British society of those who profess no religion. Edited verbatim Hansard report. The debate was summarised by HASSNERS. The speakers were Lord Harrison, Baroness Carnegy of Lour, Lord Goodhart, The Archbishop of York, Lord Judd, Baroness Flather, The Lord Bishop of Worcester, Lord Macdonald of Tradeston, Baroness Byford, Baroness Greengross, Baroness Rendell of Babergh, Lord Carey of Clifton, Baroness Murphy, Baroness Massey of Darwen, Lord Wedderburn of Charlton, Baroness Whitaker, Lord Joffe, Lord Graham of Edmonton, Lord Roberts of Llandudno, Baroness Wilcox, and Baroness Andrews.

=== July 2013 – Contributions of atheists and humanists to society ===
A debate in the House of Lords on Thursday 25 July 2013 lasted two and a half hours and more than 20,000 words were spoken. The motion of the debate was "That this House takes note of the contribution of atheists and humanists to United Kingdom society." Watch the video and read the edited verbatim report of the debate. It was covered by media sources including the BBC, British Humanist Association, Labour Lords, Atheism UK, SkepticInk, HASSNERS. The speakers were Lord Harrison, Baroness Whitaker, Baroness Meacher, Lord Bishop of Birmingham, Lord Layard, Lord Harries of Pentregarth, Lord Maxton, Lord Morgan, Baroness Flather, Baroness Massey of Darwen, Baroness Warnock, Lord Soley, Viscount Craigavon, Baroness Turner of Camden, Lord Warner, Lord Taverne, Baroness Royall of Blaisdon and Lord Ahmad of Wimbledon.
