= Doreen Massey =

Doreen Massey may refer to:

- Doreen Massey, Baroness Massey of Darwen (1938–2024), Labour member of the House of Lords
- Doreen Massey (geographer) (1944–2016), British social scientist and geographer
