= Minister of State for Energy Security and Net Zero (UK) =

Junior minister in the British Government

United Kingdom Minister of State for Energy Security and Net Zero
- Royal Arms of His Majesty's Government

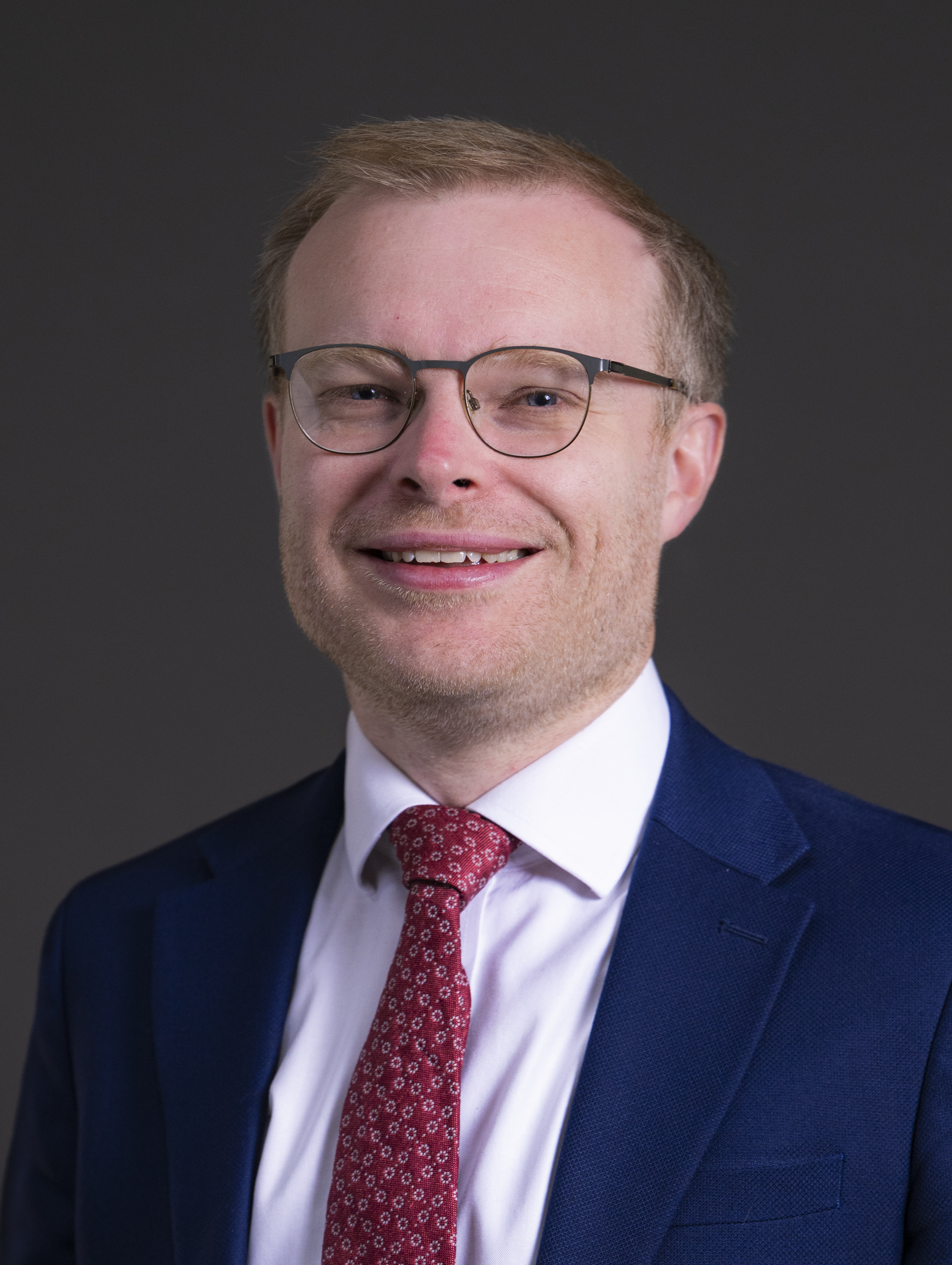
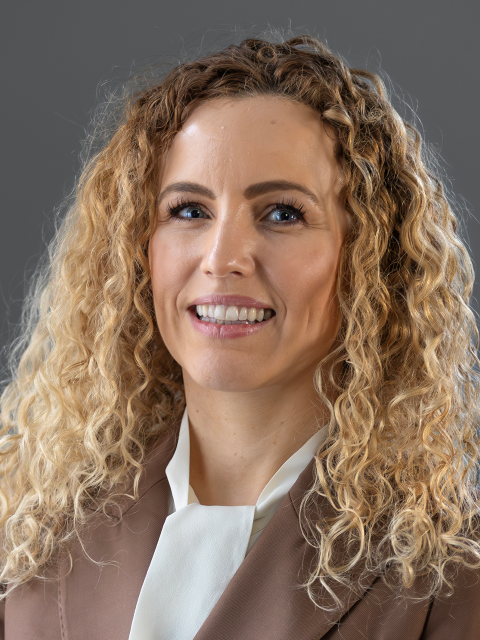
- Incumbent; Michael Shanks; Katie White since 6 September 2025; 21 July 2026
- Department for Energy Security and Net Zero
- Style: Minister
- Nominator: Prime Minister of the United Kingdom
- Appointer: The Monarch (on the advice of the Prime Minister)
- Term length: At His Majesty's pleasure
- Website: www.gov.uk/government/ministers/minister-of-state-minister-for-energy--2

The Minister of State for Energy Security and Net Zero is a mid-level position in the Department for Energy Security and Net Zero in the Government of the United Kingdom.

The role used to be part of the portfolio belonging to the secretary of state and minister of state at the Department of Energy and Climate Change.

Until 2023, the minister worked at the Department for Business, Energy and Industrial Strategy.

== History ==
The role was formerly known as Minister of State for Energy at the Department of Energy and Climate Change.

Anne-Marie Trevelyan replaced Kwasi Kwarteng as Minister of State for Business, Energy and Clean Growth at the Department for Business, Energy and Industrial Strategy in January 2021.

Greg Hands replaced Trevelyan at the 2021 British cabinet reshuffle.

== Responsibilities ==
The minister is responsible for the following:

- Clean Power 2030
- Great British Energy
- Renewables and biomass
- Energy systems, the grid and networks
- Energy market reform, including REMA and Reformed National Pricing
- Energy security, resilience and preparedness
- North Sea transition
- Oil and gas refineries
- Carbon capture, usage and storage (CCUS)
- Greenhouse gas removals (GGRs)
- Hydrogen
- Powering AI
- Energy Independence Bill

== List of energy ministers ==
Name	Term of office		Political party	Prime minister
Minister of State, Energy
David Howell	8 January 1974	4 March 1974	Conservative	Edward Heath
Thomas Balogh	7 March 1974	4 December 1975	Labour	Harold Wilson
John Smith	4 December 1975	14 April 1976	Labour	Harold Wilson
Dickson Mabon	14 April 1976	4 May 1979	Labour	James Callaghan
Hamish Gray	7 May 1979	13 June 1983	Conservative	Margaret Thatcher
Alick Buchanan-Smith	13 June 1983	13 June 1987	Conservative	Margaret Thatcher
Peter Morrison	13 June 1987	26 July 1990	Conservative	Margaret Thatcher
Parliamentary under-Secretary of State, Energy
Colin Moynihan	24 July 1990	11 April 1992	Conservative	John Major
David Heathcoat-Amory	28 November 1990	11 April 1992	Conservative	John Major
Minister of State, Energy
Timothy Eggar	15 April 1992	20 July 1994	Conservative	John Major
Minister of State for Energy and Competitiveness in Europe
Timothy Eggar	20 July 1994	23 July 1996	Conservative	John Major
Greg Knight	23 July 1996	2 May 1997	Conservative	John Major
David Simon, Baron Simon of Highbury	May 1997	July 1999	Labour	Tony Blair
Helen Liddell	29 July 1999	24 January 2001	Labour	Tony Blair
Peter Hain	25 January 2001	7 June 2001	Labour	Tony Blair
Minister of State for Energy and Construction
Brian Wilson	11 June 2001	13 June 2003	Labour	Tony Blair
Minister of State for Energy and e-Commerce
Mike O'Brien	10 September 2004	11 May 2005	Labour	Tony Blair
Minister of State for Energy
Malcolm Wicks	11 May 2005	10 November 2006	Labour	Tony Blair
Peter Truscott, Baron Truscott	10 November 2006	28 June 2007	Labour	Tony Blair
Malcolm Wicks	28 June 2007	5 October 2008	Labour	Gordon Brown
Minister of State for Energy and Climate Change
Mike O'Brien	5 October 2008	8 June 2009	Labour	Gordon Brown
Joan Ruddock	8 June 2009	11 May 2010	Labour	Gordon Brown
Charles Hendry	12 May 2010	4 September 2012	Conservative	David Cameron
Minister of State for Energy
John Hayes	4 September 2012	28 March 2013	Conservative	David Cameron
Michael Fallon	28 March 2013	15 July 2014	Conservative	David Cameron
Matt Hancock	15 July 2014	11 May 2015	Conservative	David Cameron
Andrea Leadsom	11 May 2015	14 July 2016	Conservative	David Cameron
Minister of State for Energy and Intellectual Property
Lucy Neville-Rolfe, Baroness Neville-Rolfe	17 July 2016	21 December 2016	Conservative	Theresa May
Parliamentary Under-Secretary of State for Energy and Intellectual Property
David Prior, Baron Prior of Brampton	21 December 2016	14 June 2017	Conservative	Theresa May
Parliamentary Under-Secretary of State for Industry and Energy
Richard Harrington, Baron Harrington of Watford	14 June 2017	9 January 2018	Conservative	Theresa May
Minister of State for Energy and Clean Growth
Claire Perry	9 January 2018	24 July 2019	Conservative	Theresa May
Chris Skidmore (Interim)	20 May 2019	24 July 2019	Conservative	Theresa May
Minister of State for Business, Energy and Clean Growth
Kwasi Kwarteng	24 July 2019	8 January 2021	Conservative	Boris Johnson
Anne-Marie Trevelyan	8 January 2021	15 September 2021	Conservative	Boris Johnson
Greg Hands	16 September 2021	6 September 2022	Conservative	Boris Johnson
Minister of State for Climate Sept to Oct 2022 Minister of State for Energy and Climate Oct 2022 to Feb 2023
Graham Stuart	6 September 2022	7 February 2023	Conservative	Liz Truss
Minister of State for Energy Security and Net Zero
Graham Stuart	7 February 2023	12 April 2024	Conservative	Rishi Sunak
Justin Tomlinson	12 April 2024	5 July 2024	Conservative	Rishi Sunak
Philip Hunt, Baron Hunt of Kings Heath	9 July 2024	22 May 2025	Labour Co-op	Keir Starmer
Margaret Curran, Baroness Curran	22 May 2025	6 June 2025	Labour	Keir Starmer
Alan Whitehead, Baron Whitehead	11 November 2025	20 July 2026	Labour	Keir Starmer
Minister of State for Energy
Michael Shanks	6 September 2025	Incumbent	Labour	Keir Starmer; Andy Burnham
Minister of State for Climate Transition
Katie White	21 July 2026	Incumbent	Labour	Andy Burnham

== See also ==
- List of government ministers of the United Kingdom
- Minister of State at the Department of Energy and Climate Change
- Energy minister
