= James Sassoon, Baron Sassoon =

British businessman (born 1955)

The Right Honourable The Lord Sassoon FCA
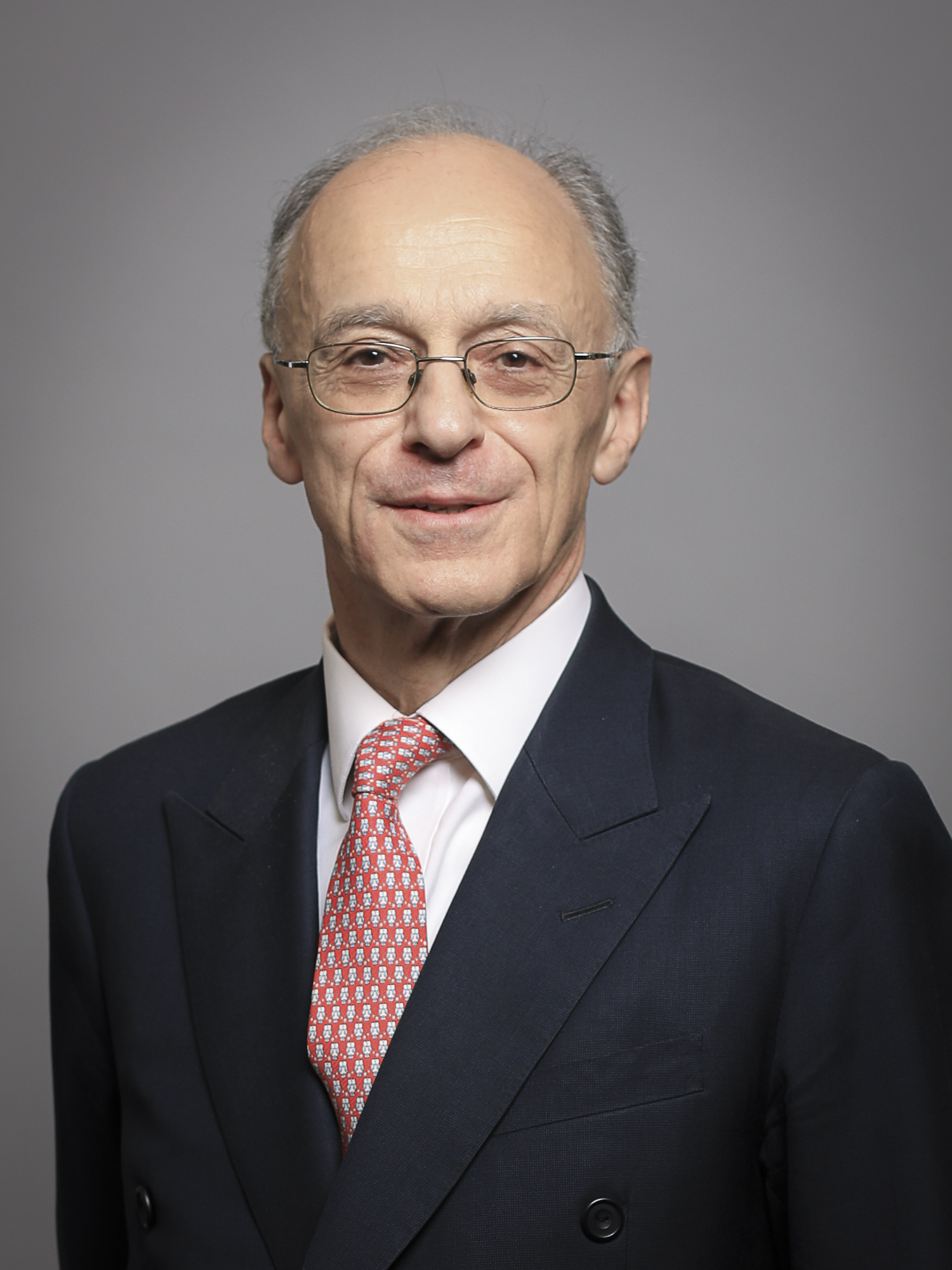

Commercial Secretary to the Treasury
- In office 11 May 2010 – 3 January 2013
- Prime Minister: David Cameron
- Preceded by: Office established
- Succeeded by: The Lord Deighton

Member of the House of Lords
- Lord Temporal
- Life peerage 29 May 2010

Personal details
- Born: 11 September 1955 (age 71) London, United Kingdom
- Party: Conservative
- Spouse: Sarah Barnes
- Relations: Sassoon family
- Children: 3
- Education: Sunningdale School; Eton College
- Alma mater: Christ Church, Oxford

James Meyer Sassoon, Baron Sassoon, FCA (born 11 September 1955) is a British businessman and politician.

After a career in the financial sector he served in various roles in HM Treasury, the UK's finance ministry, from 2002 to 2008, at which point he began advising David Cameron on financial issues. From May 2010 to January 2013, Sassoon was the first Commercial Secretary to the Treasury and was appointed to the House of Lords as a Conservative. From 2013 to 2020, he was an executive director of Jardine Matheson Holdings.

Lord Sassoon is president, formerly chairman, of the China-Britain Business Council. He is chair of Sir John Soane's Museum and of the Pilgrim Trust. Sassoon is a non-executive director of Arbuthnot Banking Group, of Barco NV and of China Construction Bank. He is a member of the international advisory council of the China Investment Corporation. Sassoon was president of the international Financial Action Task Force on Money Laundering 2007–2008. He is President of the Chelsea Society.

== Early life and education ==
Sassoon is a member of the Sassoon family, and was born in London, the son of Hugh Meyer Sassoon (first cousin of Siegfried Sassoon) and Marion (née Schiff); he is the great-great grandson of Sassoon David Sassoon.

He was educated at Sunningdale School, a junior boarding independent school in the village of Sunningdale in Berkshire, where he was a friend of David Profumo, the son of John Profumo. Thereafter he attended Eton College, a senior boarding school, also in Berkshire, followed by Christ Church at the University of Oxford, where he read Philosophy, Politics and Economics.

== Career ==
=== Finance and business ===
In 1977 Sassoon began his career in finance at Thomson McLintock & Company. In 1985, he joined S.G. Warburg & Co. (later UBS Warburg). He became a director in 1995, leading the firm's privatisation business, and from 2000 to 2002 he served as vice-chairman of investment banking.

Sassoon served as a director of the following organisations: Partnerships UK, 2002–06; Merchants Trust, 2006–10 (chairman 2010); the ifs School of Finance, 2009–10 (chairman) and the Nuclear Liabilities Fund, 2008–2010. He was a trustee of the National Gallery Trust, 2002–09. He is a trustee emeritus of the British Museum, trustee 2009–10 and 2013–2021, deputy chair 2021.

From 2013 to 2021 he was a member of the global advisory board of Mitsubishi UFJ Financial Group. From 2013 to 2020, he was an executive director of Jardine Matheson Holdings and of Matheson & Co. He was also a director of Hongkong Land, Dairy Farm International Holdings and Mandarin Oriental.

He is president, formerly chairman, of the China-Britain Business Council. He is chair of Sir John Soane's Museum and of the Pilgrim Trust. Sassoon is a non-executive director of Arbuthnot Banking Group and of Arbuthnot Latham & Co, of Barco NV and of China Construction Bank Corporation. He is a member of the international advisory council of the China Investment Corporation.

=== Government and politics ===
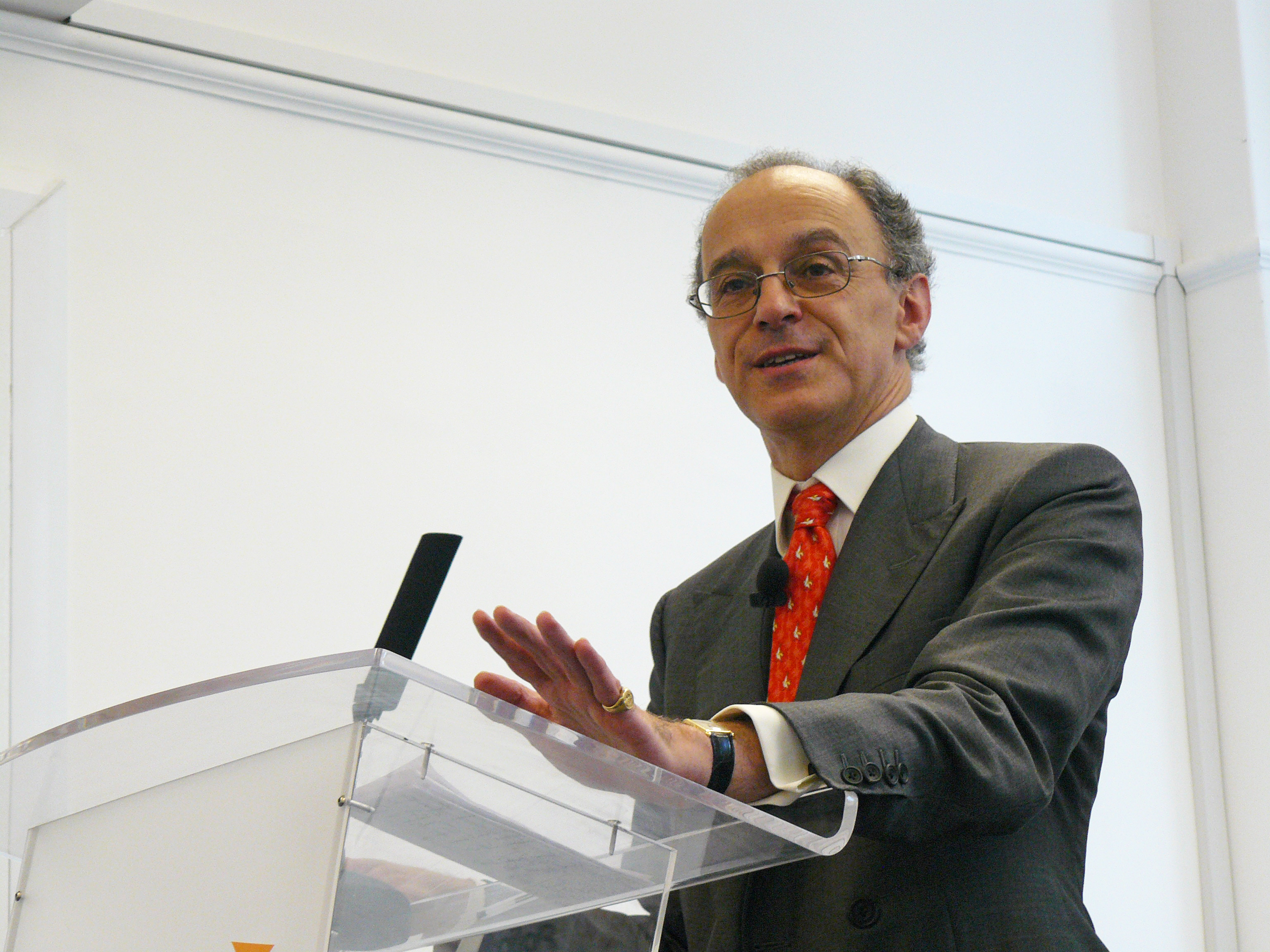
Lord Sassoon speaking in 2012

In 2002, he joined HM Treasury as managing director of finance, regulation and industry, and served until 2006. Sassoon then became the chancellor's representative for promotion of the city. In 2007, he was named president of the Financial Action Task Force on Money Laundering, also responsible for combating terrorism financing. He continued in both roles until 2008. Sassoon received a knighthood in the 2008 New Year Honours. At that time, he began advising David Cameron, then the Leader of the Opposition, and George Osborne, then the Shadow Chancellor of the Exchequer, and became a member of the Shadow Cabinet's Economic Recovery Committee.

In 2009, he wrote The Tripartite Review, a review of the adequacy of the UK's three financial regulators (the Financial Services Authority, HM Treasury and the Bank of England), especially as regards financial stability.

In May 2010, he was named Commercial Secretary to the Treasury, a minister whose portfolio included financial services and business. In consequence, it was announced he would be made a life peer, and on 3 June 2010 he was introduced in the House of Lords as Baron Sassoon, of Ashley Park in the County of Surrey.

In the 2012 Cabinet reshuffle it was announced he would be replaced by Lord Deighton in January 2013 as Commercial Secretary to the Treasury and in line with Sassoon's desire to return to the private sector.

In November 2017, he was mentioned in the Paradise Papers as one of the beneficiaries of a Cayman Island trust fund worth $236 million in 2007, and defended its assets as being of non-UK origin contributed only by his grandmother, who had died more than 40 years prior.

== Personal life ==
In 1981, Sassoon married Sarah Barnes, daughter of the former ambassador to Israel and the Netherlands, Sir Ernest John Ward Barnes and Lady (Cynthia) Barnes of Hurstpierpoint. They have a son and two daughters.

== Arms ==
Coat of arms of James Sassoon, Baron Sassoon
Crest On a mount Vert a fern-brake surmounted by a dove volant having in the beak a laurel branch all Proper the wings semee of estoiles Or. Escutcheon Or a palm-tree eradicated Proper between on the dexter a pomegranate also Proper and on the sinister a branch of laurel fructed Vert on a chief Azure a lion passant of the first in the dexter paw a rod erect Gold. Supporters Dexter a lion Or sinister an Indo-Chinese tiger Proper both statant on a rock also Proper. Motto Candide Et Constanter

Orders of precedence in the United Kingdom
Preceded by The Lord Wei	Gentlemen; Baron Sassoon	Followed by The Lord Wolfson of Aspley Guise
