= Chelsea Society =

The Chelsea Society was founded in 1927, by the Chelsea historian and author Reginald Blunt, with the aim of protecting the historic fabric of Chelsea and of influencing future environmental changes. The Society's aims are to protect the interests of all who live and work in Chelsea and to preserve and enhance the unique character of the Chelsea district of the Royal Borough of Kensington and Chelsea. The Society has organised debates and discussions about the area.

== Planning ==
All planning applications are studied and comments sent to the Royal Borough of Kensington and Chelsea.

The Society also works with residents' associations and convenes an annual meeting with them.

== Activities ==
Activities include:

- a Winter Season of Lectures on subjects related to Chelsea
- the Summer Meeting which takes the form of an evening garden party with a buffet supper
- visits to places of local interest and other special events

The Annual General Meeting, held in November, deals with the business of the Society and is yet another opportunity for members to meet.

== Annual Report ==
This has been published without a break since 1927 and contains, not only the Chairman's and the Treasurer's reports and a list of the membership, but illustrated articles of topical and historical interest on Chelsea.

A complete run of back numbers with an accumulative index is available for reference in the Chelsea Public Library.

== Newsletter ==
This is sent out twice a year to members informing them of the current work of the Society. It can also be viewed on the Society's website.

== Governance ==
- President: Lord Sassoon
- Vice-Presidents: The Mayor of Kensington and Chelsea, The Earl Cadogan DL, and Greg Hands MP, Member for Chelsea and Fulham
- Honorary Vice-President: David Le Lay
