= China–Britain Business Council =

- Abbreviation: CBBC
- Formation: 1954
- Type: Trade Promotion - NGO/Non-Profit
- Headquarters: London
- Board of directors: Vice-Chairmen: Mr David Sayer, Mr Duncan Clark OBE, Mr Gordon Orr Board Members: Dr David Pilsbury, Dr Zhi Shengke, Mr David Roth, Mr Ed Salt, Mr Jonathan Bewes, Mr Kenneth Macpherson, Mr Neil Sampson, Mr Philip Thomson, Mr Simon Yang, Ms Catherine Li, Ms Sharon Cheng, Sir Charles Bowman
- Key people: Peter Burnett OBE (Chief Executive), Sir Sebastian Wood KCMG (Chair), Lord Sassoon, Kt (President), Mr Peter Batey, CMG, OBE (Vice-President),
- Staff: 130
- Website: www.cbbc.org

The China–Britain Business Council (CBBC) is the leading British organisation promoting trade and investment between the UK and China.

The objective of CBBC is to assist UK organisations to do business in China, to work with Chinese companies in the UK and to support UK-China partnerships in third markets. It works in close collaboration with the Department for International Trade (DIT), for whom it delivers China business development services.

CBBC also cooperates closely with the private sector and trade associations, the British Embassy and Consulates in China; the British Chambers of Commerce in China, and the Local Enterprise Partnerships (LEPs) in the UK and the Devolved Administrations, as well as local chambers and other relevant organisations across the UK.

In addition, CBBC organises missions to the Chinese market; identifies business opportunities; and provides research as well as a range of other practical services for UK companies in the market.

CBBC also hosts inward delegations from China, arranges events in the UK and China, and hosts business events for all senior Chinese leaders visiting the UK.

CBBC has a staff based in the UK, as well as 10 locations in China. The main China office is in Beijing.

CBBC also provides an in-house research service that is specifically tailored to the needs of each company. All research is carried out by CBBC's project managers across the China offices. CBBC has conducted such research projects in a wide range of sectors, including both product and service industries.

== History ==
The organisation's history dates back to the early 1950s when British companies were among the first to trade with Communist China. That was the 48 Group of Companies (established in April 1954). At the same time, the British government had a semi-official trade body known as the Sino-British Trade Council which promoted British participation in trade fairs and exhibitions in China. Although the UK was the first Western country to recognize the People's Republic of China, the PRC did not fully recognize the UK until 1972 (see Sino-British relations).

The China–Britain Trade Group was established in 1991, when the 48 Group merged with Sino-British Trade Council, at the instigation of the (then) UK Department of Trade and Industry.

After the first six months, CBTG had a membership of 100 British companies, large and small, paying an annual subscription. Members were able to attend exclusive meetings with Chinese visitors, attend specialist workshops, and had priority access to special events.

A big incentive of membership for many was the provision of services by the CBTG's two China offices. As the number of offices grew, CBTG continued to offer this service to members, and it is still a benefit of membership today.

The early 1990s saw a renewal of high-level visits from China to the UK In November 1992 vice-premier Zhu Rongji was the first Chinese leader to take part in a seminar with British business in the UK, when the Stock Exchange was the venue for presentations from privatised industries, organised by CBTG and the Stock Exchange.

The biggest events of the mid-1990s were the huge business groups taken to China by Michael Heseltine, as trade minister in 1995, then as deputy prime minister in 1996. CBTG was involved in putting together the business groups which accompanied the deputy prime minister. In 1996 a decision was made to allow member companies to appoint representatives in China and rent space in CBTG offices, which would provide services to them. Visiting CBTG Beijing that year, Michael Heseltine coined a name for this service: the China Launchpad. This has since become a popular service which the China–Britain Business Council still offer UK companies.

The return of Hong Kong to Chinese sovereignty in 1997 led to warmer relations with the UK. Less than a month after his appointment as premier in 1998, Zhu Rongji was back in the UK, where a CBTG dinner in London's Guildhall attracted 900 guests.

That year, the organisation changed its name to the China–Britain Business Council (CBBC), to reflect the growth of all round business between the UK and China encompassing investment, trade, licensing and other forms of business activity.

In November 1999, the UK received the first head of state from the People's Republic of China, Jiang Zemin, who was greeted by a CBBC organised business lunch at the Banqueting House.

In the UK, CBBC's promotion of opportunities in China has never stopped. In its first year, there began a long tradition of organising a nationwide programme of seminars and conferences. Since then there has been a continuous programme of conferences and seminars with VIP speakers, briefings around the country for groups of exporters, and meetings with Chinese industrial and provincial leaders.

Lord Powell, a former foreign affairs adviser to Prime Minister Margaret Thatcher, took over the presidency of CBBC in 1998. His first task was to accompany Prime Minister Tony Blair to China with a business delegation. The following year saw visits to the UK by then Vice-Premier Wen Jiabao, and President Jiang Zemin. CCPIT chairman Wan Jifei followed in 2001, and in October that year, the then Vice-President Hu Jintao also came to the UK.

Sir David Brewer, Former Lord Mayor of the City or London, became CBBC Chairman in 2007, and continued to push forward CBBC's contribution to UK-China trade and business exchange, and he has now, through his career, made well over 100 trips to China.

In 2013, Lord James Sassoon was announced as the new CBBC Chairman. This was also the year that CBBC celebrated the 60th anniversary of its founding. China-Britain business relations have become strong in recent years with the support of CBBC. In 2014, Chinese premier Li Keqiang visited the UK with Lord Sassoon jointly hosting a state dinner on honour of Mr Li, attended by 650 British and Chinese political and business dignitaries. In 2015, Lord Sassoon as Chairman of CBBC hosted the UK-China Business Summit during President XI Jinping's visit to the UK.

== Objectives ==
The objectives of CBBC are:

- Overall to maximise Britain's trade with China;
- To encourage British firms and organisations with appropriate capabilities to enter the China market;
- To help British companies identify profitable business opportunities in China;
- To support the activities of British companies in China;
- To provide particular assistance and encouragement to SMEs.

== Events ==
China–Britain Business Council holds regular business events including Chinese delegations to the UK, seminars, webinars, Chinese inward missions, networking events and business clinics. CBBC has 4 pillar events each year:

- China Business Conference
- SME China Forum
- China Outbound Conference
- Great British Brands Festival

== See also ==
- China Council for the Promotion of International Trade (CCPIT)
- China Investment Promotion Agency (CIPA)
