= Parliamentary Under-Secretary of State for Health Innovation =

Junior minister in the British Government

- Royal Arms of His Majesty's Government

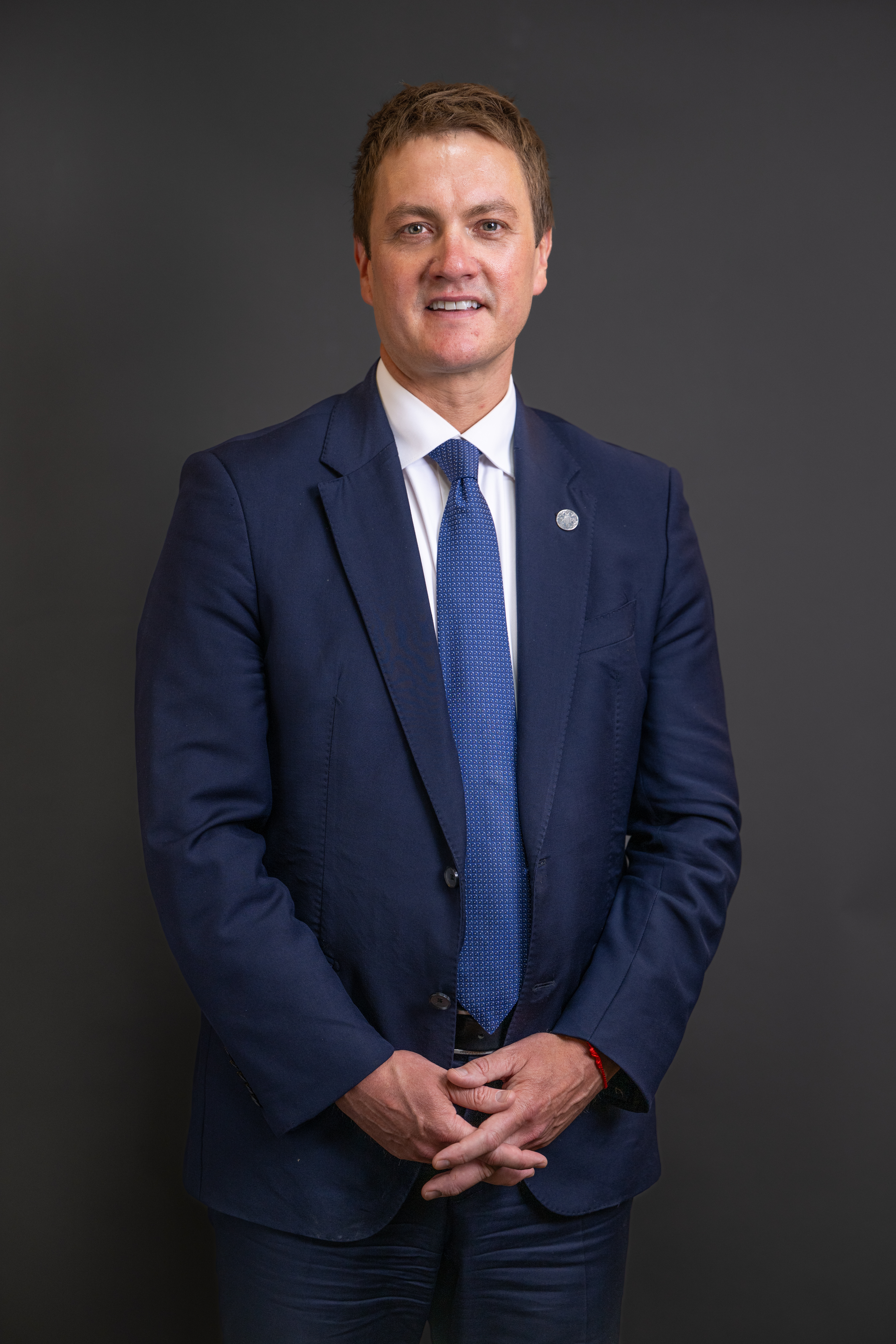
- Incumbent; James Frith since 22 July 2026
- Department of Health and Social Care
- Style: Minister
- Nominator: Prime Minister of the United Kingdom
- Appointer: The Monarch; on advice of the Prime Minister
- Term length: At His Majesty's pleasure
- Website: www.gov.uk/government/ministers/parliamentary-under-secretary-of-state--298

The Parliamentary Under-Secretary of State for Health Innovation is a junior ministerial position in the Department of Health and Social Care in the British government. It is currently held by James Frith MP.

The role has had different formal titles under various administrations, owing to varying responsibilities and political emphasis, such as Parliamentary Under-Secretary of State for Life Science, Parliamentary Under-Secretary of State for Quality and Parliamentary Under-Secretary of State for Care Quality.

This office has traditionally been held by a member of the House of Lords.

== Responsibility ==
The Parliamentary Under Secretary of State for Health Innovation leads on the following policy areas:

- NHS data and technology
- medtech (medical technology)
- medicines
- research and innovation
- rare diseases
- major and long-term conditions
- international and devolved governments
- men’s health
- dentistry
- eyecare

== List of ministers ==
Name	Portrait	Entered office	Left office	Political party	Ministry
Parliamentary Under-Secretary of State for Health
Gloria Hooper, Baroness Hooper		28 July 1989	14 April 1992	Conservative	Thatcher III; Major I
Julia Cumberlege, Baroness Cumberlege		14 April 1992	2 May 1997	Conservative	Major II
Minister of State for Health
Margaret Jay, Baroness Jay of Paddington		2 May 1997	27 July 1998	Labour	Blair I
Parliamentary Under-Secretary of State for Health
Helene Hayman, Baroness Hayman		28 July 1998	29 July 1999	Labour	Blair I
Philip Hunt, Baron Hunt of Kings Heath		1 January 1998	17 March 2003	Labour	Blair I Blair II
Minister of State for National Health Services Delivery
Norman Warner, Baron Warner		13 June 2003	4 January 2007	Labour	Blair II; Blair III
Minister of State for National Health Services Reform
Philip Hunt, Baron Hunt of Kings Heath		5 January 2007	28 June 2007	Labour	Blair III
Parliamentary Under-Secretary of State for Health
Ara Darzi, Baron Darzi of Denham		29 June 2007	21 July 2009	Labour	Brown
Glenys Thornton, Baroness Thornton		19 February 2010	11 May 2010	Labour	Brown
Frederick Curzon, 7th Earl Howe		17 May 2010	11 May 2015	Conservative	Cameron–Clegg
Parliamentary Under-Secretary of State for National Health Services Productivity
David Prior, Baron Prior of Brampton		14 May 2015	21 December 2016	Conservative	Cameron II; May I
Parliamentary Under-Secretary of State for Health
James O'Shaughnessy, Baron O'Shaughnessy		21 December 2016	31 December 2018	Conservative	May I May II
Parliamentary Under-Secretary of State for Life Science
Nicola Blackwood, Baroness Blackwood of North Oxford		10 January 2019	13 February 2020	Conservative	May II; Johnson I & II
Parliamentary Under-Secretary of State for Innovation
James Bethell, 5th Baron Bethell		9 March 2020	17 September 2021	Conservative	Johnson II
Parliamentary Under-Secretary of State for Technology, Innovation and Life Sciences
Syed Kamall, Baron Kamall		17 September 2021	20 September 2022	Conservative	Johnson II
Parliamentary Under-Secretary of State for Health and Social Care
Nick Markham, Baron Markham		22 September 2022	5 July 2024	Conservative	Truss; Sunak
Parliamentary Under-Secretary of State for Health Innovation and Safety
Zubir Ahmed MP		6 September 2025	12 May 2026	Labour	Starmer
Preet Kaur Gill MP		12 May 2026	22 July 2026	Labour	Starmer
Parliamentary Under-Secretary of State for Health Innovation
James Frith MP		22 July 2026	Incumbent	Labour	Burnham

== See also ==
- List of government ministers of the United Kingdom
- Parliamentary Under-Secretary of State
