= Philip Hunt, Baron Hunt of Kings Heath =

British life peer (born 1949)

The Right Honourable The Lord Hunt of Kings Heath OBE PC
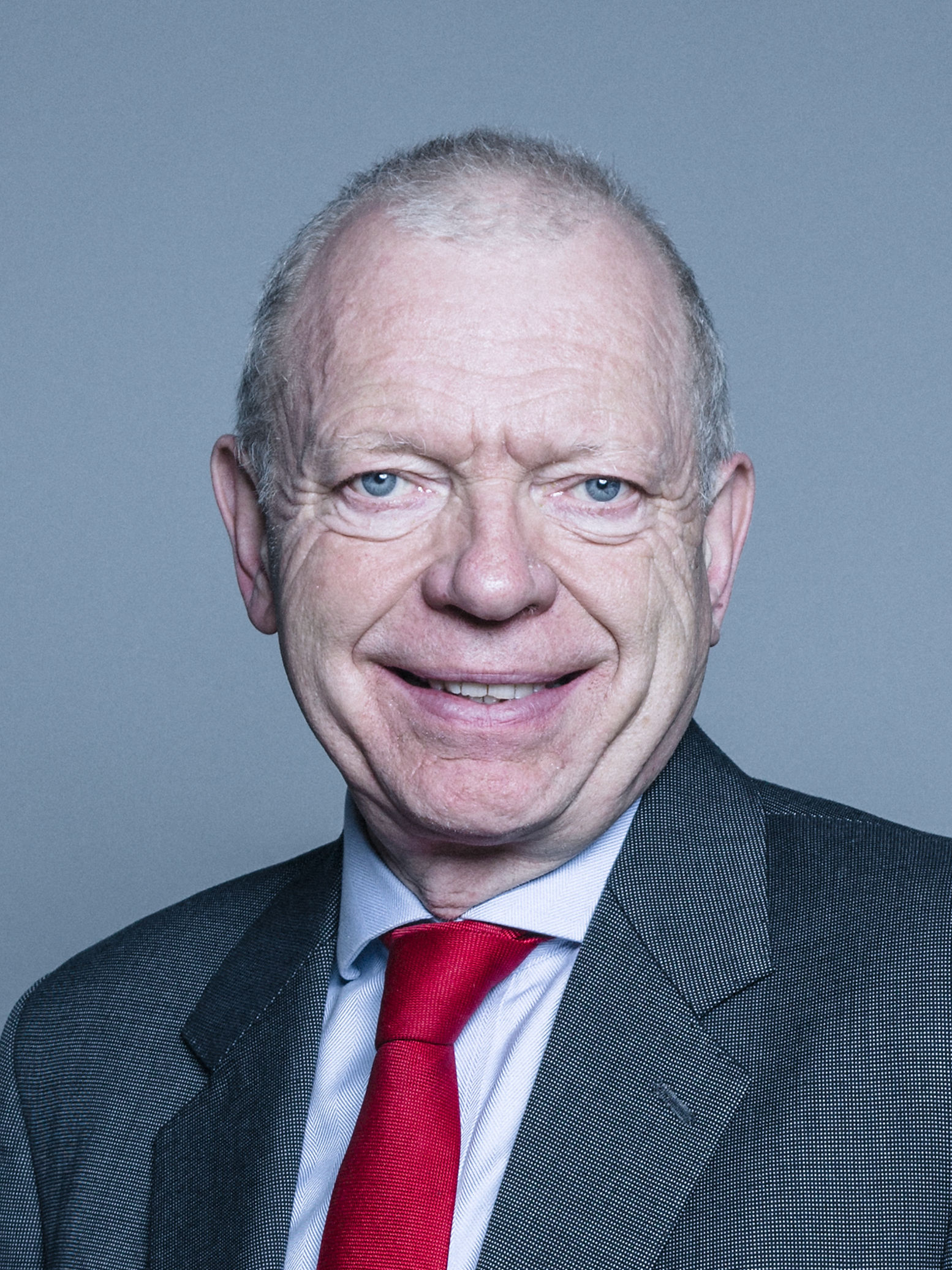
- Official portrait, 2018

Minister of State for Energy Security and Net Zero
- In office 9 July 2024 – 22 May 2025
- Prime Minister: Keir Starmer
- Preceded by: Justin Tomlinson
- Succeeded by: The Baroness Curran

Deputy Leader of the House of Lords
- In office 5 October 2008 – 11 May 2010
- Prime Minister: Gordon Brown
- Leader: The Baroness Royall of Blaisdon
- Preceded by: The Lord Rooker
- Succeeded by: The Lord McNally
Junior ministerial offices 1998-2010
Minister of State for Sustainable Development, Climate Change Adaptation and Air Quality
In office 5 October 2008 – 11 May 2010
| Prime Minister | Gordon Brown |
| Preceded by | Phil Woolas |
| Succeeded by | Greg Barker |
Parliamentary Under-Secretary of State for Justice
In office 2 July 2007 – 5 October 2008
| Prime Minister | Gordon Brown |
| Preceded by | The Baroness Ashton of Upholland |
| Succeeded by | The Lord Bach |
Minister of State for National Health Services Reform
In office 5 January 2007 – 28 June 2007
| Prime Minister | Tony Blair |
| Preceded by | The Lord Warner |
| Succeeded by | The Lord Darzi of Denham |
Parliamentary Under-Secretary of State for Work and Pensions
In office 10 May 2005 – 4 January 2007
| Prime Minister | Tony Blair |
| Preceded by | The Baroness Hollis of Heigham |
| Succeeded by | The Lord McKenzie of Luton |
Parliamentary Under-Secretary of State for Health
In office 1 January 1998 – 17 March 2003
| Prime Minister | Tony Blair |
| Preceded by | Position established |
| Succeeded by | The Lord Warner |
Lord-in-Waiting Government Whip
In office 28 July 1998 – 28 July 1999
| Prime Minister | Tony Blair |
| Preceded by | The Lord Whitty |
| Succeeded by | The Lord Bach |

Member of the House of Lords
- Lord Temporal
- Life peerage 20 October 1997

Personal details
- Born: 19 May 1949 (age 77)
- Party: Labour Co-operative
- Education: University of Leeds Politics BA

Philip Alexander Hunt, Baron Hunt of Kings Heath, OBE, PC (born 19 May 1949) is a former health administrator and a Labour Co-operative member of the House of Lords who served as Minister of State in the Department for Energy Security and Net Zero from 2024 to 2025.

== Early life and career ==
Born in 1949, Philip Hunt was educated at the single-sex grammar school City of Oxford High School for Boys, later the Oxford School. He graduated from the University of Leeds in 1970 with a Bachelor of Arts degree in political studies.

== Professional career ==
Hunt became a works study officer in 1972 for the Oxford Regional Hospital Board, moving to Nuffield Orthopaedic Centre as hospital administrator in 1974. He was the first Secretary of Edgware and Hendon Community Health Council. He was the first Chief Executive of the NHS Confederation, and previously Director of the National Association of Health Authorities and Trusts (NAHAT) from its formation in 1990. Before that he was Director of its predecessor organisation, the National Association of Health Authorities (NAHA) from 1984 to 1990. In the 1993 Birthday Honours, he was appointed to the Order of the British Empire as an Officer (OBE) for "services to the NHS".

Hunt was President of the Royal Society for Public Health from 2010 to 2018.

== Parliamentary career ==
In 1997, Hunt was created a life peer in the House of Lords with the title Baron Hunt of Kings Heath, of Birmingham in the County of West Midlands, taking the Labour whip. He served as a Parliamentary Under-Secretary of State (PUSS) at the Department of Health from 1999 until his resignation in 2003 over the Invasion of Iraq.

Hunt was re-appointed to government in May 2005 as a PUSS at the Department for Work and Pensions. He returned to the Department of Health as Minister of State in January 2007.

Following the appointment of Gordon Brown as Prime Minister, Hunt moved to the Ministry of Justice as a PUSS in July of that year. In the October 2008 government reshuffle, Hunt became Deputy Leader of the House of Lords and Minister of State for Sustainable Development, Climate Change Adaptation and Air Quality at both the Department for Environment, Food and Rural Affairs (DEFRA) and the newly created Department of Energy and Climate Change (DECC), later leaving DEFRA in 2009 to work solely at DECC. In June 2009, he was sworn in as a member of the Privy Council. He left his ministerial offices in May 2010 after Labour lost the general election.

Following the election of Ed Miliband as Labour Party leader, Hunt was appointed Labour's spokesperson on Home Affairs and the Cabinet Office in the House of Lords. He left these roles in September 2012. He served as Shadow Deputy Leader of the House of Lords from 2010 until 2017. He was a Lords spokesperson for Health, later Health and Social Care, from 6 September 2012 until leaving the role on 24 May 2018 to become a backbencher.

In September 2011, Hunt contributed to the book What next for Labour? Ideas for a new generation; his piece was entitled Our NHS: The Labour Party Challenge.

From 2011 until 2014, he served as Chair of Heart of England NHS Foundation Trust.

Political offices
| Preceded by The Lord Rooker | Deputy Leader of the House of Lords; 2008–2010 | Succeeded by The Lord McNally |
Orders of precedence in the United Kingdom
| Preceded by The Lord Cope of Berkeley | Gentlemen; Baron Hunt of Kings Heath | Followed by The Lord Hunt of Wirral |
