= Jim O'Neill, Baron O'Neill of Gatley =

English economist (born 1957)

The Right Honourable The Lord O'Neill of Gatley
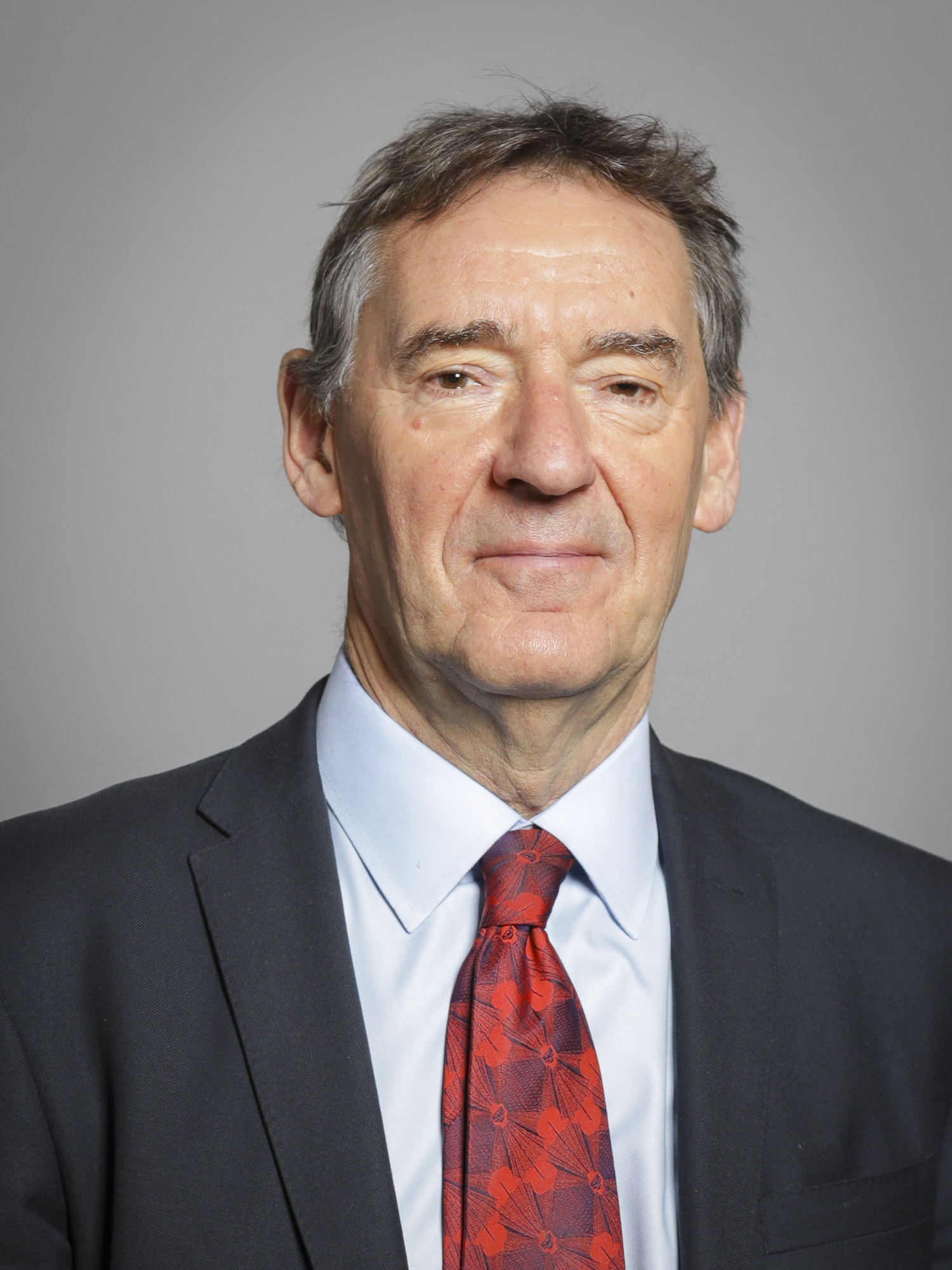
- O'Neill in 2020

Commercial Secretary to the Treasury
- In office 14 May 2015 – 23 September 2016
- Prime Minister: David Cameron; Theresa May
- Chancellor: George Osborne; Philip Hammond
- Preceded by: The Lord Deighton
- Succeeded by: The Baroness Neville-Rolfe

Member of the House of Lords
- Lord Temporal
- Life peerage 28 May 2015

Personal details
- Born: Terence James O'Neill; 17 March 1957 (age 69) Manchester, England
- Party: None (Crossbencher) (since 2017)
- Other political affiliations: Non-affiliated (2016–2017); Conservative (2015–2016)
- Spouse: Married
- Children: Two
- Education: University of Sheffield; University of Surrey
- Known for: BRIC economics term

Terence James O'Neill, Baron O'Neill of Gatley (born 17 March 1957) is an English economist best known for coining BRIC, the acronym that stands for Brazil, Russia, India, and China—the four once-rapidly developing countries that he predicted would challenge the global economic power of the developed G7 economies. He is also a former chairman of Goldman Sachs Asset Management and former Conservative government minister.

O'Neill was Commercial Secretary to the Treasury in the Second Cameron Ministry from May 2015 to September 2016. He chaired the UK's Independent Review into Antimicrobial Resistance from 2014 to 2016. He was the chairman of the Council of Chatham House, the Royal Institute of International Affairs from 2018 to 2021.

== Education ==
O'Neill grew up in Gatley and attended Burnage High School for Boys, a comprehensive school. He obtained a Bachelor of Arts (BA) degree in 1977 and a Master of Arts (MA) degree in economics from Sheffield University in 1978. He earned his PhD degree in economics from the University of Surrey in 1982, with a thesis titled An empirical investigation into the OPEC surplus and its disposal. On the 16 January 2024, O’Neill was granted an honorary Doctorate of Letters by the University of Hull.

== Career ==
Early in his career, O'Neill worked at Bank of America and Marine Midland Bank. In 1988, he joined Swiss Bank Corporation where he became SBC's chief of global research. He joined Goldman Sachs in 1997 and he was appointed as the head of global economics research in 2001.

=== Goldman Sachs ===
In 2010, he headed Goldman Sachs's Division of Asset Management where O'Neill managed over $800 billion in assets. His new appointment was regarded as a symbol of Goldman's efforts to reposition itself for Wall Street's post-2008 financial crisis era, one in which Goldman Sachs is "bullish" about the fact that emerging markets are "the future". In 2011, he was included in the 50 Most Influential ranking of Bloomberg Markets magazine.

In 2001, O'Neill coined the term "BRIC" in "The World Needs Better Economic BRICs" in a Goldman Sachs's "Global Economic Paper" series, on the four emerging markets of Brazil, Russia, India, and China. Other terms he coined or adopted and popularized have been the "Next Eleven" (or N-11) for Bangladesh, Egypt, Indonesia, Iran, Mexico, Nigeria, Pakistan, the Philippines, South Korea, Turkey, and Vietnam, arguing they would be among the world's largest economies in the 21st century. In 2011, O'Neill stated that he preferred the term "growth markets" over "emerging markets" and spotlighted Mexico, Indonesia, South Korea and Turkey in addition to the BRIC markets, which the media dubbed "MIST" and, collectively, the "Growth-8". In November 2013, he adopted and popularized MINT for Mexico, Indonesia, Nigeria and Turkey, which had been coined by Fidelity International in May 2011. O'Neill retired from the firm in 2013.

=== Other ===
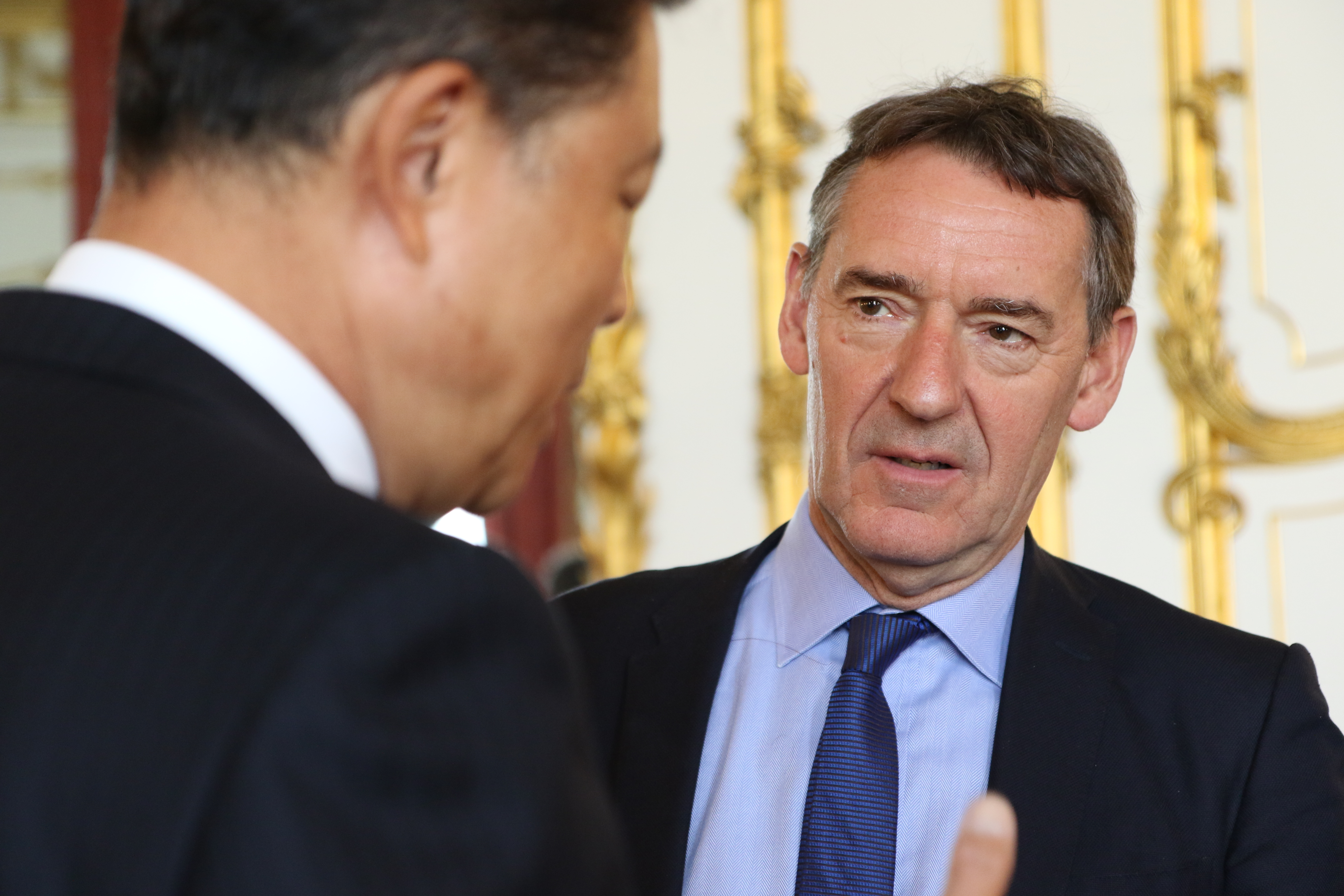
O'Neill at a briefing for Heads of Missions on the Review on Antimicrobial Resistance on May 19, 2016

He was a founding board member of Bruegel. On 2 July 2014, he was appointed by UK Prime Minister David Cameron to head an international commission to investigate global antimicrobial resistance. In 2018, Lord O'Neill published the book Superbugs: An Arms Race Against Bacteria co-written with Anthony McDonnell and Will Hall.

=== House of Lords ===
In 2015, he was created a Life Peer as Baron O'Neill of Gatley, of Gatley in the County of Greater Manchester, and took up an unpaid post in HM Government as the Commercial Secretary to the Treasury. In this role O'Neill's primary role was to work on the Northern Powerhouse project and to help reinvigorate trade with China. Following the resignation of David Cameron as Prime Minister his successor, Theresa May, kept O'Neill in post. In 2016, O'Neill resigned over concerns that May was not committed to the Northern Powerhouse project, making him the first member of May's ministry to resign.

O'Neill sat in the House of Lords as a Conservative life peer from 28 May 2015 to 23 September 2016. After leaving the Conservatives, he then sat as a non-affiliated member of the House of Lords 23 September 2016 to 9 October 2017, and he has sat as a member of the crossbenchers since 9 October 2017.

A native Mancunian, he has supported fiscal devolution for Manchester. In June 2026, it was reported that he was advising Andy Burnham in advance of a potential leadership bid.

== Personal life ==
O'Neill met his wife Caroline when studying at Surrey university.

He is an enthusiastic football fan and played for the Bank of America's first team in London. He is a lifelong follower of Manchester United F.C. and served as a non-executive director from 2004 to 2005, before the club was returned to private ownership. On 2 March 2010, the Red Knights, a group of wealthy Manchester United fans believed to include O'Neill, confirmed interest in a possible takeover of the club.

In 2014, O'Neill was awarded an Honorary Litt.D. degree by the University of Sheffield. He has honorary degrees from the Institute of Education of the University of London and from City University London.

Orders of precedence in the United Kingdom
Preceded by The Lord Maude of Horsham	Gentlemen; Baron O'Neill of Gatley	Followed by The Lord Bridges of Headley
