= Paul Deighton, Baron Deighton =

British politician

The Right Honourable The Lord Deighton KBE
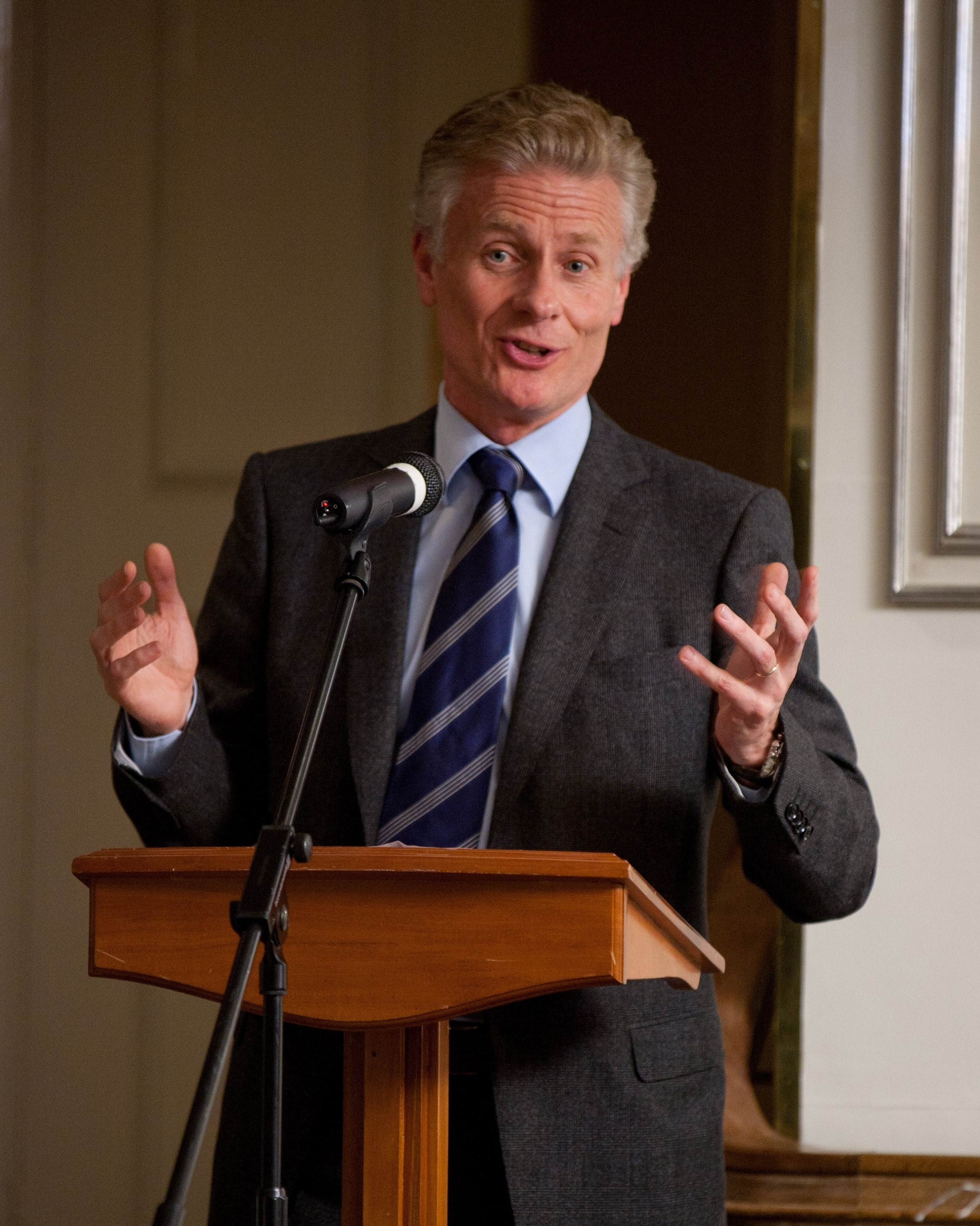
- Deighton speaking at the Moët Hennessy Financial Times Club dinner in London, 2011

Commercial Secretary to the Treasury
- In office 3 January 2013 – 14 May 2015
- Prime Minister: David Cameron
- Chancellor: George Osborne
- Preceded by: The Lord Sassoon
- Succeeded by: The Lord O'Neill of Gatley

Member of the House of Lords
- Lord Temporal
- Life peerage 1 November 2012

Personal details
- Born: 18 January 1956 (age 70) Carshalton, Surrey, UK
- Party: Conservative
- Education: Trinity College, Cambridge

Paul Clive Deighton, Baron Deighton, KBE (born 18 January 1956) is a British Conservative politician who was Commercial Secretary to HM Treasury from January 2013 to May 2015. Deighton is a former investment banker who was Chief Executive of the London Organising Committee of the Olympic and Paralympic Games (LOCOG), the organisation responsible for planning the 2012 Summer Olympics and Paralympics.

Deighton is chairman of The Economist Group.

== Early life ==
Deighton was born in Carshalton, Surrey on 18 January 1956. He was educated at Wallington County Grammar School before going on to Trinity College, Cambridge, graduating in 1978 with a Bachelor of Arts degree in economics.

== Career ==
=== Banking ===
Before joining Goldman Sachs in 1983, Deighton worked for Bank of America and Security Pacific National Bank. In 1983, he joined investment bank Goldman Sachs, initially based in London. He spent two years at their New York office from 1994, where he was joint Head of Controllers. In 1996 he returned to London, where he was promoted to Head of European Operations and became a partner in the firm. In 2000 he became their Chief Operating Officer for Europe.

=== Olympics London 2012 ===
Deighton was appointed CEO of LOCOG, announced on 19 December 2005. Deighton commented that it was "the only job I would have considered leaving Goldman Sachs for". He has been credited with contributing to the success of the London Olympics. His approach included early winning of sponsorships, and high levels of staff training.

=== After the Olympics ===
In September 2012 Deighton was appointed by Prime Minister David Cameron as junior minister in HM Government as Commercial Secretary to the Treasury, with effect from January 2013. The announcement stated that he would lead on infrastructure and economic delivery, with responsibility for implementing the Government's National Infrastructure Plan and supporting the Culture Secretary with the 2012 Olympics legacy. The delay in his taking up the appointment was necessary to allow him to complete his duties at LOCOG.

To make him accountable to Parliament, he was created a life peer on 1 November 2012 as Baron Deighton, of Carshalton in the County of Surrey, and introduced in the House of Lords the same day.

Deighton was succeeded as Commercial Secretary to the Treasury by Jim O'Neill in May 2015.

In March 2016 Deighton was announced as the new Chairman of London Heathrow Airport.

In March 2018 it was announced that Deighton would become chairman of the board of The Economist Group.

=== COVID-19 pandemic ===
On 19 April 2020 when it was announced that the death toll in the UK alone of the COVID-19 pandemic had reached 15,000 over the three months precedent, Deighton was appointed "PPE tsar" by Boris Johnson, who himself was recovering from a bout in the intensive care unit with the disease.

=== Pandora Papers scandal ===
Deighton was named in the Pandora Papers scandal as having abused his position as a Tory peer.

== Honours ==
In 2012, Deighton received the Olympic Order from Jacques Rogge, and received the Paralympic Order from the International Paralympic Committee.

Deighton was appointed Knight Commander of the Order of the British Empire in the 2013 New Years Honours for services to the London 2012 Olympic and Paralympic Games.

Coat of arms of Paul Deighton, Baron Deighton
Crest An American bald eagle wings elevated Proper supporting with the dexter claws an ionic column Argent. Escutcheon Azure three bezants between two chevrons Argent all between three London 2012 Olympic torches Or enflamed Proper. Supporters On either side a lion rampant Argent that to the dexter resting a foot on a bezant and that to the sinister resting a foot on an artist's palette Or. Motto Temet Nosce Alios Accende.

== Personal life ==
Deighton and his wife met whilst working at Goldman Sachs. They have two adult sons. Deighton supports Arsenal F.C.

Orders of precedence in the United Kingdom
Preceded by The Lord Trees	Gentlemen; Baron Deighton	Followed by The Lord Nash
