= Minister of State for Brexit Opportunities and Government Efficiency =

Minister of the Government of the United Kingdom

United Kingdom Minister of State for Brexit Opportunities and Government Efficiency
- Royal Arms of His Majesty's Government

- Flag of the United Kingdom
- Cabinet Office
- Style: Brexit Opportunities Minister (informal)
- Status: Minister of State; Minister of the Crown
- Reports to: Chancellor of the Duchy of Lancaster
- Seat: Westminster, London
- Appointer: The British monarch on advice of the Prime Minister
- Term length: At His Majesty's pleasure
- Inaugural holder: Theodore Agnew, Baron Agnew of Oulton
- Formation: 13 February 2020
- Final holder: Jacob Rees-Mogg
- Abolished: 6 September 2022
- Website: gov.uk

The minister of state for Brexit opportunities and government efficiency was a ministerial office from February 2020 to September 2022 in the Cabinet Office in the Government of the United Kingdom.

This position was created (as "Minister for Efficiency and Transformation") by Prime Minister Boris Johnson in February 2020 as a renaming of Minister of State for the Treasury with new responsibilities. It was a joint office with HM Treasury and the Cabinet Office from 2020 to 2022. After Jacob Rees-Mogg was appointed in February 2022, the role was made a full member of the Cabinet; he was based solely at the Cabinet Office. Following Rees-Mogg's departure on 6 September 2022, to become Secretary of State for Business, Energy and Industrial Strategy under Liz Truss, no replacement was appointed and the office was abolished.

== Responsibilities ==
Responsibilities of the post included:

- Brexit Opportunities
- Spend controls (including controls reform)
- Public bodies
- Government reform
- Procurement Bill
- Places for Growth (a team within the Cabinet Office which aims to relocate Civil Service roles away from London to the regions and nations of the UK)
- Commercial and commercial models
- Functions:- Commercial Tackling Fraud, Error and Debt; and Grants Government Property Agency Office of Government Property
- Infrastructure and Projects Authority (jointly with HMT)

== Officeholders ==
Name	Term of office		Political party
Minister of State for Efficiency and Transformation
The Lord Agnew of Oulton	13 February 2020	24 January 2022	Conservative
Minister of State for Brexit Opportunities and Government Efficiency
Jacob Rees-Mogg	8 February 2022	6 September 2022	Conservative
