= David Evans, Baron Evans of Watford =

British publisher & Labour peer (born 1942)

The Right Honourable The Lord Evans of Watford

Member of the House of Lords
- Lord Temporal
- Life peerage 28 July 1998

Personal details
- Born: 30 November 1942 (age 83)
- Party: Labour (suspended)
- Occupation: Publishing, Consultancy and Healthcare and Charity
- Website: http://www.senateconsulting.co.uk

David Charles Evans, Baron Evans of Watford (born 30 November 1942) is a British businessperson and politician. As a Member of the House of Lords, he sits as a Labour peer.

In December 2025, Evans was suspended from the House of Lords for five months after a finding that his actions "could erode public trust in parliamentarians" for four separate breaches of the House of Lords Code of Conduct.

== Early life ==
Evans attended Watford College of Technology and was awarded the Edward Hunter Gold Medal as best student, as well as being awarded Full Technologist qualifications.

== Career ==
Following the sale of Centurion Press, Evans founded Senate Publishing Ltd with his business partner Caroline Minshell. Evans was a Trustee of the Royal Air Force Museum and is a Director of the Royal Air Force Museum Trading Company. He is chairman of the Institute of Collaborative Working. Evans was Senior Advisor to Ron Wahid, Chairman of Arcanum Global, a global strategic intelligence company and a subsidiary of Magellan Investment Holdings.

Evans was created a life peer on 28 July 1998 taking the title Baron Evans of Watford, of Chipperfield in the County of Hertfordshire.

=== Work for Azerbaijan ===
Evans has given gushing support of Azerbaijan. He praised the Azerbaijani state oil company SOCAR's contracts with BP, celebrated Azerbaijan's victory over Armenia in a 2020 war, and supported Azerbaijan's bid to host COP29. These remarks were controversial due to Azerbaijan's corrupt, environmentally destructive and authoritarian regime.

SOCAR contracted with Evans's publishing company Senate Publishing to produce three glossy books about SOCAR over the period 2015–2019. A fourth book was planned in 2022, but it was cancelled amid reporting into Evans. Evans never formally disclosed to the British parliament that his company was being paid by SOCAR. He defended this non-disclosure, saying "It is Senate Publishing that has contractual business relations with SOCAR — not me. There was nothing to disclose.” He has refused to disclose how much the company was paid by SOCAR.

The authoritarian regime in Azerbaijan paid for Evans to visit the country in 2015, 2016, 2018, and 2020 to serve as an election monitor. Evans praised the conduct of the elections, even though reputable election monitors deemed the elections not free and fair. Evans's son was also paid to monitor an Azerbaijani election in 2018, when the son was 18 years old, which earned him a glowing letter of recommendation from the Azerbaijan ambassador to the United Kingdom – Evans's son proudly this letter on his LinkedIn page until 2024. Evans's son also worked as a paid intern for SOCAR in Geneva in 2023.

Evans has made two spoken contributions in Parliament since 2010. One of those contributions was to urge the British government to ask Armenia to inform Azerbaijan about the location of landmines in conflict areas between the two countries.

=== Work for Kazakhstan ===
He is a director of Jusan Technologies Limited, a Kazakh-linked investment holding company. The company sued TBIJ, The Telegraph and openDemocracy for defamation over articles published in early 2022. The claim against the Telegraph was settled in January 2024.

=== Offering parliamentary services for reward ===
In February 2025, The Guardian published a report alleging that Lord Evans had offered access to ministers - including Housing Secretary and Deputy Prime Minister Angela Rayner - in return for a payment of £25,000, as part of a sponsorship of a commercial event in Parliament run by Evans' son. On 4 March 2025, the House of Lords Commissioners for Standards started an investigation of possible breaches of the House of Lords rules.

On 8 December 2025, the House of Lords approved a recommendation from its Conduct Committee to suspend Evans from the service of the House for five months, following a finding that he had committed four separate breaches of the House of Lords Code of Conduct. The breaches included offering parliamentary services for payment or reward, failing to act on personal honour, and misusing House facilities for commercial purposes through events sponsored on behalf of a company in which he held shares. The Conduct Committee described the conduct as having the potential to erode public trust in parliamentarians. The suspension took effect following a motion agreed to by the House. Lord Evans had the Labour whip removed.

== Arms ==
Coat of arms of David Evans, Baron Evans of Watford
Crest A demi-Roman centurion the corslet Argent phalerae and pteryges Or the cloak Gules fastened at the dexter shoulder with a brooch Or the helmet Argent garnished Or plumed Gules and holding in the dexter hand a baculum of vinewood Or. Escutcheon Or a chevron compony countercompony Gules and Azure per pale counterchanged on the dexter in the Gules a hayhook and on the sinister in the Azure a hayhook contourny Argent. Supporters Dexter a stag Argent unguled and attired Or and holding in the mouth a raceme of fuchsia also Or flowered Gules sinister a unicorn double queued Argent armed maned unguled and tail tufted Or in the mouth an anemone Gules slipped and leaved Or. Motto Scripta Edere Cogitata Diffundere.

Orders of precedence in the United Kingdom
Preceded by The Lord Bach	Gentlemen; Baron Evans of Watford	Followed by The Lord Warner
