= Minister of State for the Treasury =

British government minister

The Minister of State for the Treasury was a junior position in the HM Treasury, occasionally used in the British government. The title has not been used since May 2010, with some responsibilities passed to the Commercial Secretary to the Treasury and later the Minister of State for Efficiency and Transformation, a joint office with HM Treasury and the Cabinet Office.

== Responsibilities ==
Supporting the Chancellor of the Duchy of Lancaster and the Chief Secretary to the Treasury to deliver cross-government efficiency and public sector transformation improvements including:

- Public value and planning and performance
- Supporting the Chancellor of the Duchy of Lancaster on cross-government functions and controls, including public bodies and Cabinet Office domestic

== List of ministers ==
Name	Portrait	Entered office	Left office	Political party	Notes
Dick Taverne		6 April 1968	13 October 1969	Labour	Minister of State for the Treasury
Bill Rodgers		13 October 1969	19 June 1970	Labour	Minister of State for the Treasury
Terence Higgins		23 June 1970	7 April 1972	Conservative	Minister of State for the Treasury
John Nott		7 April 1972	4 March 1974	Conservative	Minister of State for the Treasury
Robert Sheldon		18 October 1974	17 June 1975	Labour	Minister of State for the Treasury
Denzil Davies		17 June 1975	4 May 1979	Labour	Minister of State for the Treasury
Peter Rees		6 May 1979	14 September 1981	Conservative	Minister of State for the Treasury
Arthur Cockfield, Baron Cockfield		6 May 1979	6 April 1982	Conservative	Minister of State for the Treasury
Jock Bruce-Gardyne		15 September 1981	11 November 1981	Conservative	Minister of State for the Treasury
Barney Hayhoe		11 November 1981	2 September 1985	Conservative	Minister of State for the Treasury
John Wakeham		6 April 1982	9 June 1983	Conservative	Minister of State for the Treasury
Ian Gow		2 September 1985	19 November 1985	Conservative	Minister of State for the Treasury
Peter Brooke		19 November 1985	13 June 1987	Conservative	Minister of State for the Treasury
Office not in use		13 June 1987	28 November 1990		
Gillian Shephard		28 November 1990	11 April 1992	Conservative	Minister of State for the Treasury
John Cope		14 April 1992	20 July 1994	Conservative	Minister of State for the Treasury also Paymaster General
Anthony Nelson		20 July 1994	6 July 1995	Conservative	Minister of State for the Treasury
David Heathcoat-Amory		20 July 1994	20 July 1996	Conservative	Minister of State for the Treasury also Paymaster General
Office not in use		20 July 1996	25 January 2008		
Liam Byrne		25 January 2008	3 October 2008	Labour	Minister of State for Revenue Protection at the Border
Phil Woolas		5 October 2008	6 May 2010	Labour	Minister of State for the Treasury
Office not in use		6 May 2010	Present		
