= Norman Warner, Baron Warner =

British civil servant and politician (born 1940)

The Right Honourable The Lord Warner PC
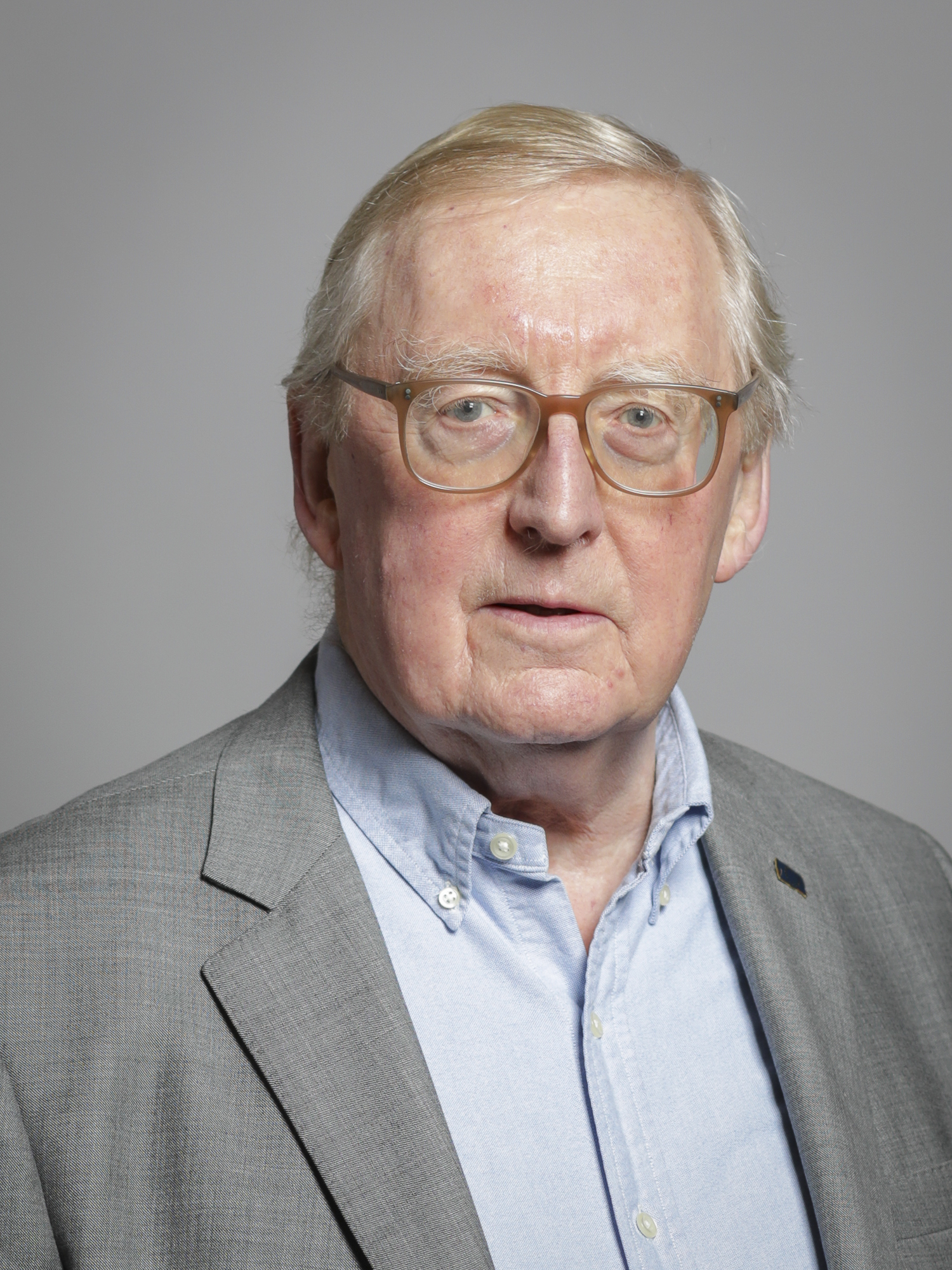
- Official portrait, 2019

Minister of State for National Health Services Delivery
- In office 10 May 2005 – 4 January 2007
- Prime Minister: Tony Blair
- Preceded by: Position established
- Succeeded by: The Lord Hunt of Kings Heath

Parliamentary Under-Secretary of State for Health
- In office 13 June 2003 – 10 May 2005
- Prime Minister: Tony Blair
- Preceded by: The Lord Hunt of Kings Heath
- Succeeded by: Liam Byrne

Chairman of the Youth Justice Board
- In office March 1998 – June 2003
- Appointed by: David Blunkett
- Preceded by: Position established
- Succeeded by: Charles Pollard (acting)

Member of the House of Lords
- Lord Temporal
- Life peerage 29 July 1998 – 1 August 2024

Personal details
- Born: Norman Reginald Warner; 8 September 1940 (age 86)
- Party: Labour (before 2015); Crossbench (from 2015)
- Education: University of California, Berkeley
- Occupation: Civil servant

Norman Reginald Warner, Baron Warner, PC (born 8 September 1940), is a British former civil servant and member of the House of Lords. A career civil servant from 1960, he was created a life peer in 1998. He was Parliamentary Under-Secretary in the Department of Health from 2003 to 2007, and Minister of State at the Department of Health from 2005 to 2007. He has also been an adviser to a number of consulting companies. In October 2015, Warner resigned the Labour whip and became a non-affiliated and then crossbench member of the House of Lords, serving until his retirement in 2024.

== Early life and education ==
Warner was born on 8 September 1940. He was educated at Dulwich College, an all-boys public school in Dulwich, London. He graduated from the University of California, Berkeley with a Master of Public Health degree. From 1983 to 1984 he was the Gwilym Gibbon Fellow at Nuffield College, Oxford.

== Career ==
Following a career in the civil service in a variety of roles from 1960, Warner was Director of Social Services for Kent County Council between 1985 and 1991, and chair of the City and East London Family Services Authority 1991 to 1994. He chaired the National Inquiry into Selection, Development and Management of Staff in Children's Homes in 1992.

In 2010 Lord Warner declared he was a strategic advisor to PA Consulting Group, for "strategic advice relating to Middle East activities only".

In 2008 he told the House of Commons Public Administration Select Committee that he had "a contract with a particular part of DLA Piper concerned with infrastructure and public services and that requires me to give advice in those areas, including a bit of health regulation." In 2009 he said he was "a paid adviser to the General Healthcare Group" as well as "the chairman of NHS London Development Agency".

== Political career ==
He was created a Life Peer on 29 July 1998, taking the title Baron Warner, of Brockley in the London Borough of Lewisham. From 1997 to 1998 he was Senior Policy Adviser to Home Secretary Jack Straw, and remained an adviser to Government on family policy after being appointed to the House of Lords.

Warner was Parliamentary under-secretary of state in the Department of Health from 2003 to 2005, and a Minister of State at the Department of Health from 2005 to 2007. He was appointed to the Privy Council in June 2006, and was sworn in on 19 July 2006.

In August 2010, Warner was appointed by the Conservative–Liberal Democrat coalition government as a commissioner on the Commission on Funding of Care and Support, which was chaired by Andrew Dilnot. The commission was asked by the government to review the way in which social care is paid for in England. It recommended that people's lifetime costs should be capped, with the government paying any further costs above the level of the cap.

In June 2014, Warner was appointed as a commissioner to oversee improvements in Birmingham City Council's Children's Social Care services, following a poor review by Professor Julian Le Grand.

In October 2015, Warner resigned the Labour whip in the House of Lords and became a non-affiliated member. In a letter to the Labour leader, Jeremy Corbyn, he wrote that Labour was no longer "a credible party of government-in-waiting... Labour will only win another election with a policy approach that wins back people who have moved to voting Conservative and Ukip, as well as to Greens and SNP. Your approach is unlikely to achieve this shift."

Warner retired from the House of Lords on 1 August 2024.

== NHS controversy ==
In April 2013, Lord Warner announced he would vote with the Conservatives and Liberal Democrats in a key vote in the House of Lords on proposed NHS regulations that Labour claimed would enable companies to bid for almost all health services. He was the only Labour peer to do so.

In March 2014, Warner wrote an article for The Guardian newspaper suggesting that NHS users should pay £10 a month and £20 for every night in hospital. Labour swiftly rejected these ideas. Shadow Health Minister, Jamie Reed, commented: "This is not something Labour would ever consider. We believe in an NHS free at the point of use, and a Labour government will repeal David Cameron's NHS changes that put private profit before patient care."

Lord Warner is a director of Sage Advice Ltd, and an adviser to Xansa (a technology firm) and Byotrol (an antimicrobial company) – all of which sell or are hoping to sell services or products to the NHS, according to website Social Investigations. He also took up a position with Apax Partners – one of the leading private equity investors in healthcare, according to the Alliance for Lobbying Transparency.

== Other interests ==
He has also held the Chair of the Youth Justice Board, National Council for Voluntary Organisations and the London Region Sports Board. In 2010, Warner was elected chair of the All-Party Parliamentary Humanist Group, becoming Vice Chair in 2015.

He is a member of the Advisory Council of Reform.

He is an Honorary Associate of the National Secular Society

Orders of precedence in the United Kingdom
Preceded by The Lord Evans of Watford	Gentlemen; Baron Warner	Followed by The Lord Clarke of Hampstead
