= Doreen Massey, Baroness Massey of Darwen =

British politician (1938–2024)

The Right Honourable The Baroness Massey of Darwen
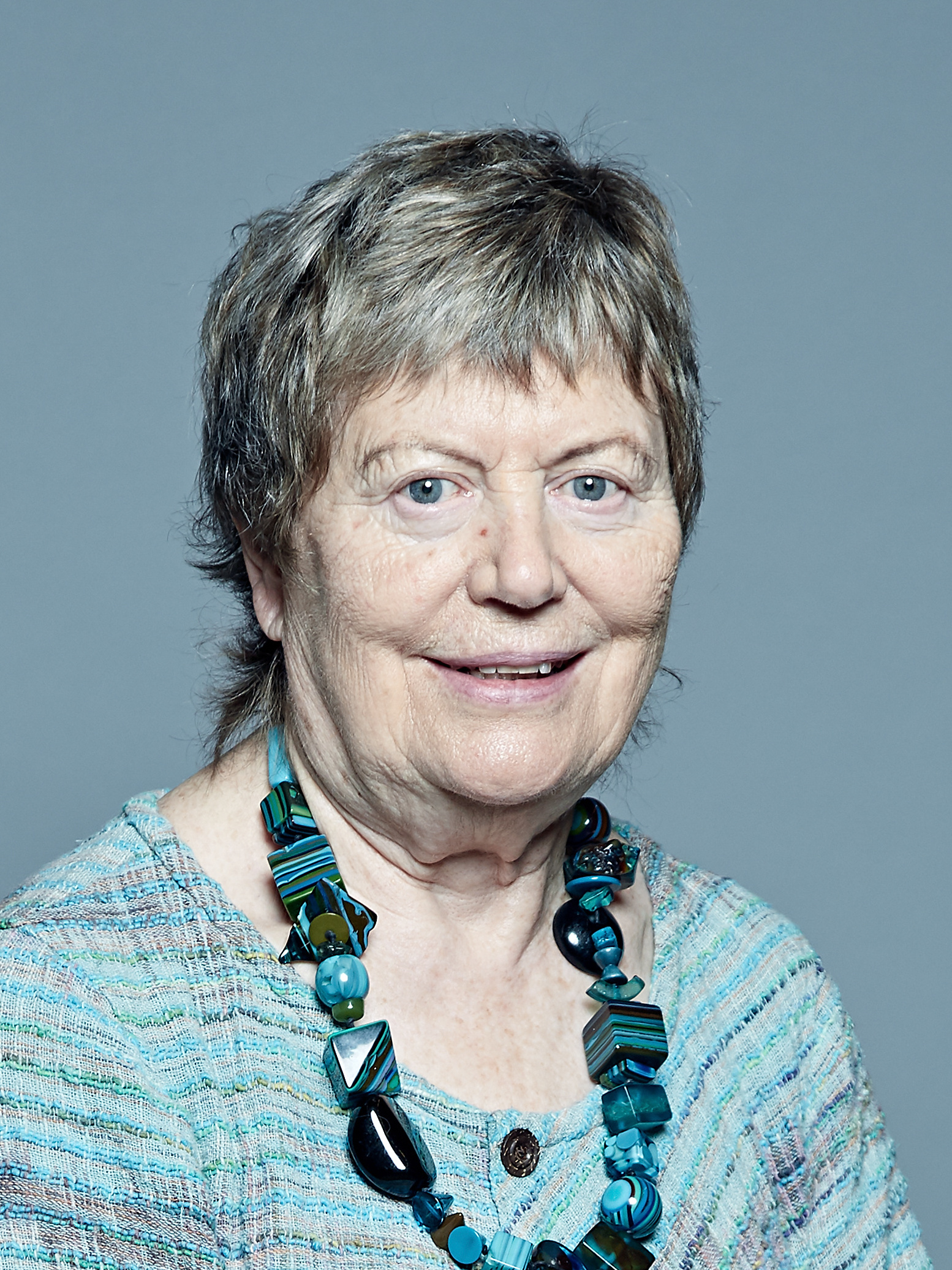
- Official portrait, 2017

Member of the House of Lords
- Lord Temporal
- Life peerage 26 July 1999 – 20 April 2024

Personal details
- Born: Doreen Elizabeth Hall; 5 September 1938 Darwen, Lancashire
- Died: 20 April 2024 (aged 85) Chailey, East Sussex, England
- Party: Labour
- Spouse: Leslie Massey (m. 1966)
- Children: 3
- Education: University of Birmingham (BA, DipEd); University of London, Institute of Education (MA)

Doreen Elizabeth Massey, Baroness Massey of Darwen (née Hall; 5 September 1938 – 20 April 2024), was a British life peer and a Labour member of the House of Lords.

== Early life and education ==
Massey was born Doreen Elizabeth Hall to Mary Ann Hall (née Sharrock) and Jack Hall on 5 September 1938. Raised in Darwen, Lancashire, she was educated Darwen Grammar School, where she was head girl, and attended the University of Birmingham, graduating with a Bachelor of Arts degree in French in 1961 and a Diploma of Education in 1962. At Birmingham, she was the vice-president of the student union and gained blues in hockey and cricket. Massey later studied at the University of London, Institute of Education, gaining a Master of Arts degree in 1985.

== Career ==
A former teacher and education advisor, she was the director of the Family Planning Association from 1989 to 1994. She was made a life peer as Baroness Massey of Darwen, of Darwen in the County of Lancashire, on 26 July 1999. She was introduced on 1 November 1999 to the House of Lords where she served as a member of the All-Party Parliamentary Group for Integrated and Complementary Healthcare.

Massey was an honorary associate of the National Secular Society, patron of Humanists UK, and vice chair of the All Party Parliamentary Humanist Group.

On 15 September 2010, Massey, along with 54 other public figures, signed an open letter published in The Guardian, stating their opposition to Pope Benedict XVI's state visit to the UK.

On 28 January 2019 Massey was the only person to remove her name from an open letter published in The Guardian opposing the "US attempt at regime change" in Venezuela. The letter was signed by Shadow Ministers, MPs, union leaders, Labour Party NEC members, cultural figures, academics, anti-war campaigners and others.

=== LGBT rights ===
In January 2022, Massey and four other Labour delegates to the Parliamentary Assembly of the Council of Europe tabled ten amendments to Resolution 2417, "Combating rising hate against LGBTI people in Europe". The amendments sought to include the word "sex" alongside gender identity, de-conflate the situation in the UK from Hungary, Poland, Russia and Turkey, and remove references to alleged anti-LGBTI movements in the UK. The delegates received both praise and criticism.

== Personal life and death ==
Doreen Hall married Leslie Massey in 1966. They had two sons and a daughter.

Baroness Massey died following a long illness with cancer at a hospice in North Chailey, near Haywards Heath, on 20 April 2024. She was 85.
