= Commercial Secretary to the Treasury =

Junior minister in the British Treasury

United Kingdom Commercial Secretary to the Treasury
- Royal arms as used by Her Majesty's Government
- HM Treasury
- Appointer: The Monarch; (on the advice of the prime minister)
- Inaugural holder: James Sassoon, Baron Sassoon
- Formation: 11 May 2010
- Abolished: 13 June 2017
- Website: HM Treasury

The commercial secretary to the Treasury is a United Kingdom Government ministerial post in HM Treasury which usually ranks at parliamentary under-secretary of state level – though during Baroness Neville-Rolfe's tenure, it was of minister of state level. On the resignation of Lord O'Neill of Gatley in September 2016, the office ceased to be in use for three months, but Lord Young of Cookham was named to serve as Treasury spokesman in the House of Lords. The Baroness Neville-Rolfe was appointed as commercial secretary on 21 December 2016; her appointment ended in June 2017.

== List of office holders ==
Colour key (for political parties):
Conservative

Portrait	Name	Term of office		Political party	Prime Minister	Chancellor
	James Sassoon; Baron Sassoon	May; 2010	3 January 2013	Conservative	Cameron (Coalition)	Osborne
	Paul Deighton; Baron Deighton	3 January 2013	14 May 2015	Conservative	Cameron (Coalition)	Osborne
	Jim O'Neill; Baron O'Neill of Gatley	14 May 2015	23 September 2016	Conservative	Cameron (II)	Osborne
	Jim O'Neill; Baron O'Neill of Gatley	14 May 2015	23 September 2016	Conservative	May (I)	Hammond
Office not in use		23 September 2016 – 21 December 2016		N/A	May (I)	Hammond
	Lucy Neville-Rolfe; Baroness Neville-Rolfe	21 December 2016	13 June 2017	Conservative	May (I)	Hammond
Office not in use		13 June 2017 – current		N/A	May (II)	Hammond
