= Boultham =

Suburb and ward of Lincoln in Lincolnshire, England

Coordinates: 53.224°N 0.554°W

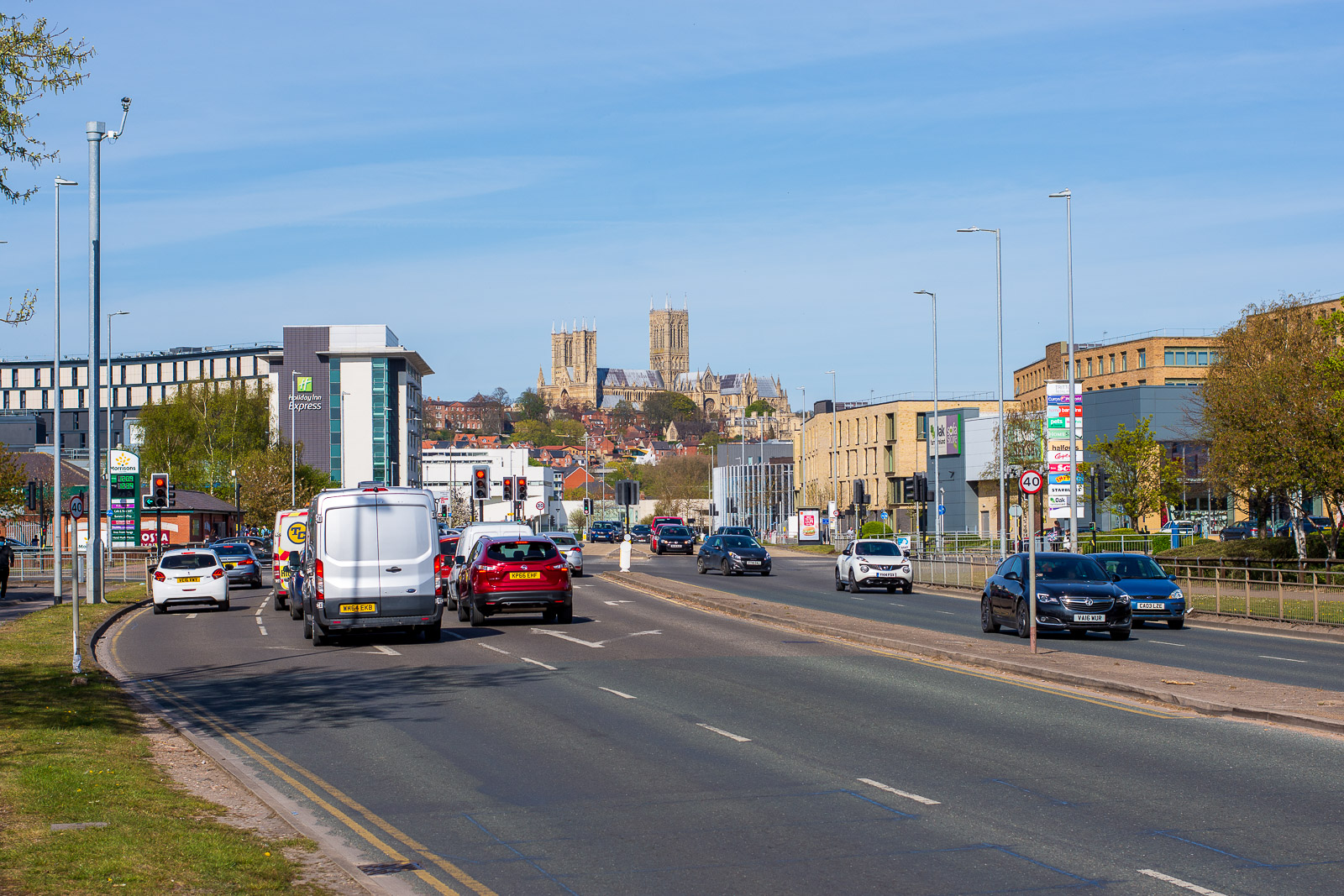
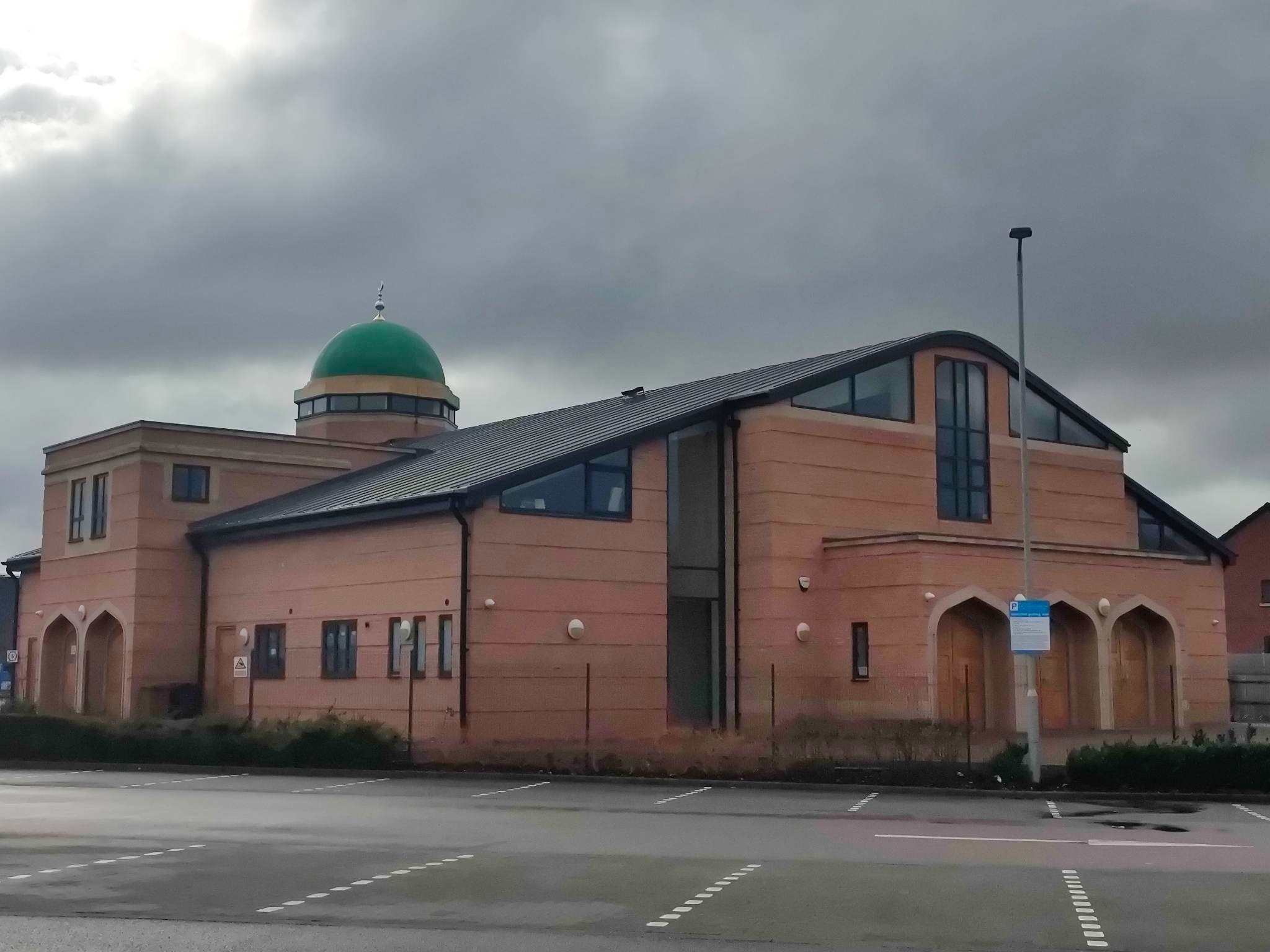
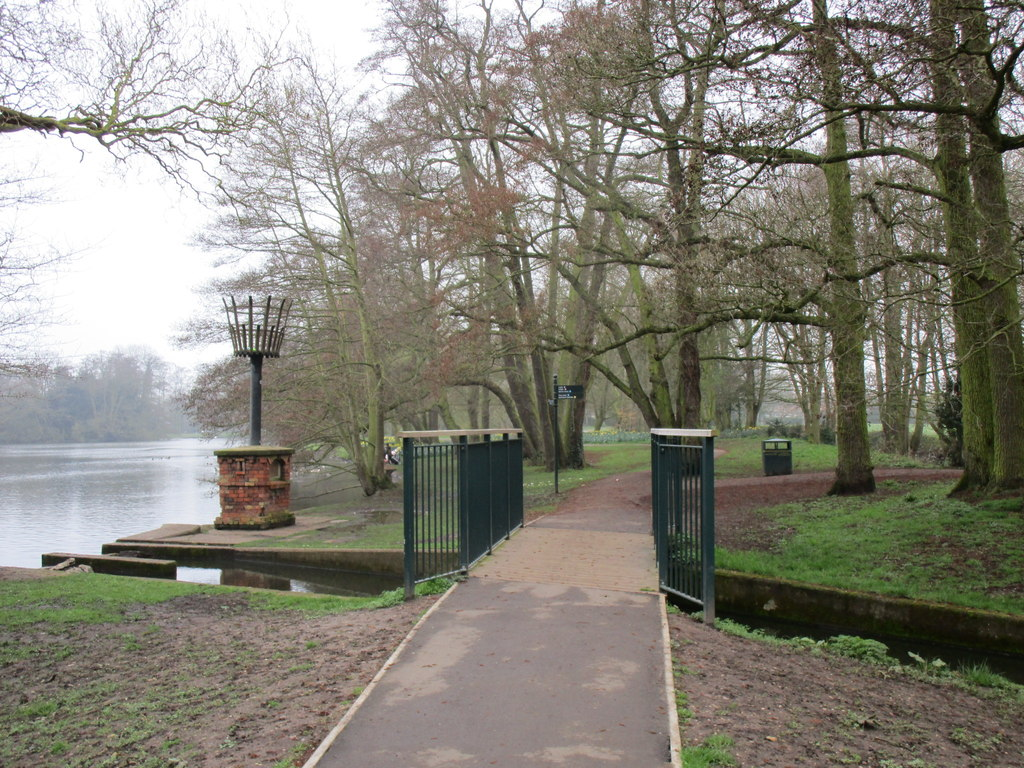
- Clockwise from top: Tritton Road, Boultham Park and Lincoln Central Mosque

- Location within Lincolnshire
- Population: 11,258 (2021 Census)
  - London: 157 mi (253 km) S
- Civil parish: Unparished
- District: Lincoln
- Shire county: Lincolnshire
- Region: East Midlands
- Country: England
- Sovereign state: United Kingdom
- Post town: Lincoln
- Postcode district: LN6
- Dialling code: 01522
- Police: Lincolnshire
- Fire: Lincolnshire
- Ambulance: East Midlands
- UK Parliament: Lincoln

Boultham is an area of the city of Lincoln in Lincolnshire, England, south-west of the city centre.

== History ==
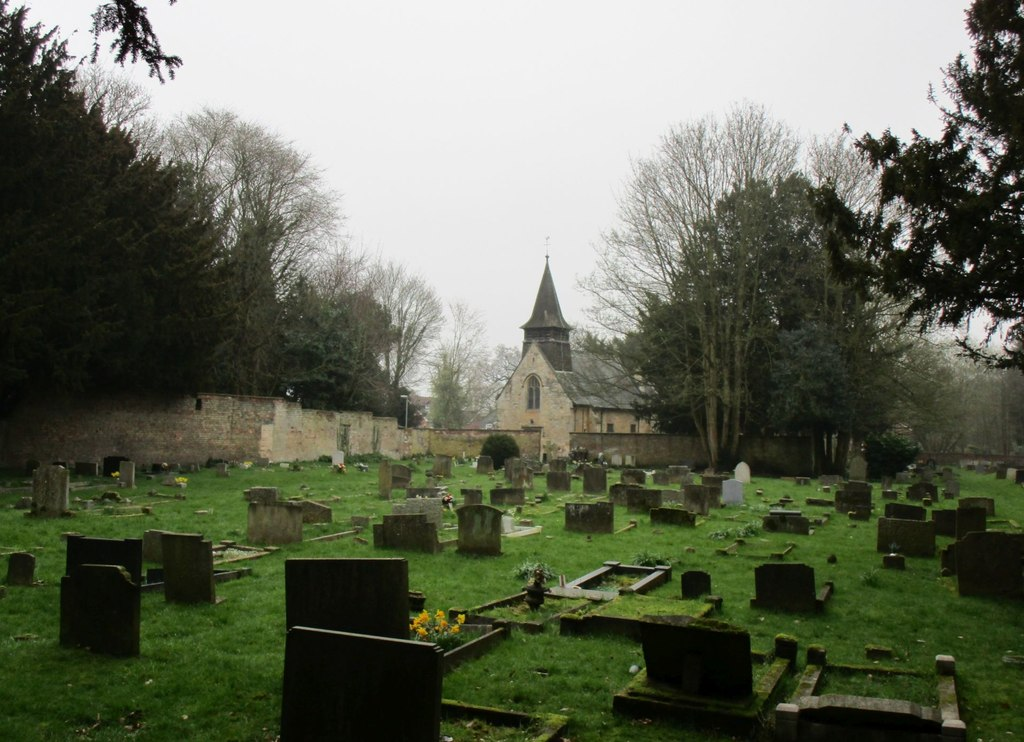
St Helen's Church

In 1911 the civil parish had a population of 1028. On 9 November 1920 the parish was abolished and merged with Lincoln.

=== 1939 Hampden crash ===
On Monday 20 March 1939 at 12pm, a Handley Page Hampden 'L4082' of 50 Sqn at RAF Waddington crashed near Boultham swimming baths, while returning from RAF Evanton in Scotland. There was wreckage over the tennis courts next door. Fire engines arrived from Lincoln.

Four airmen were killed:

- Pilot Officer Robert Alexander McAlister, aged 23, from Glasgow
- Sergeant Walter Harvey Freestone, aged 27, of Liverpool
- Aircraftman N Vincent Newsham, aged 27
- Aircraftman Frederick Roy Greensill, aged 18, of Middlewich

=== Second World War ===
On 8 May 1941, nine high explosive bombs were dropped around Westwick Gardens, killing three people, and the Rookery Lane area. The only other time that Lincoln was subsequently bombed was at 9pm on January 15 1943, by a single Dornier Do 217, with bombs landing in Saltergate, and on St Mary's Street outside the railway station.

== Geography ==
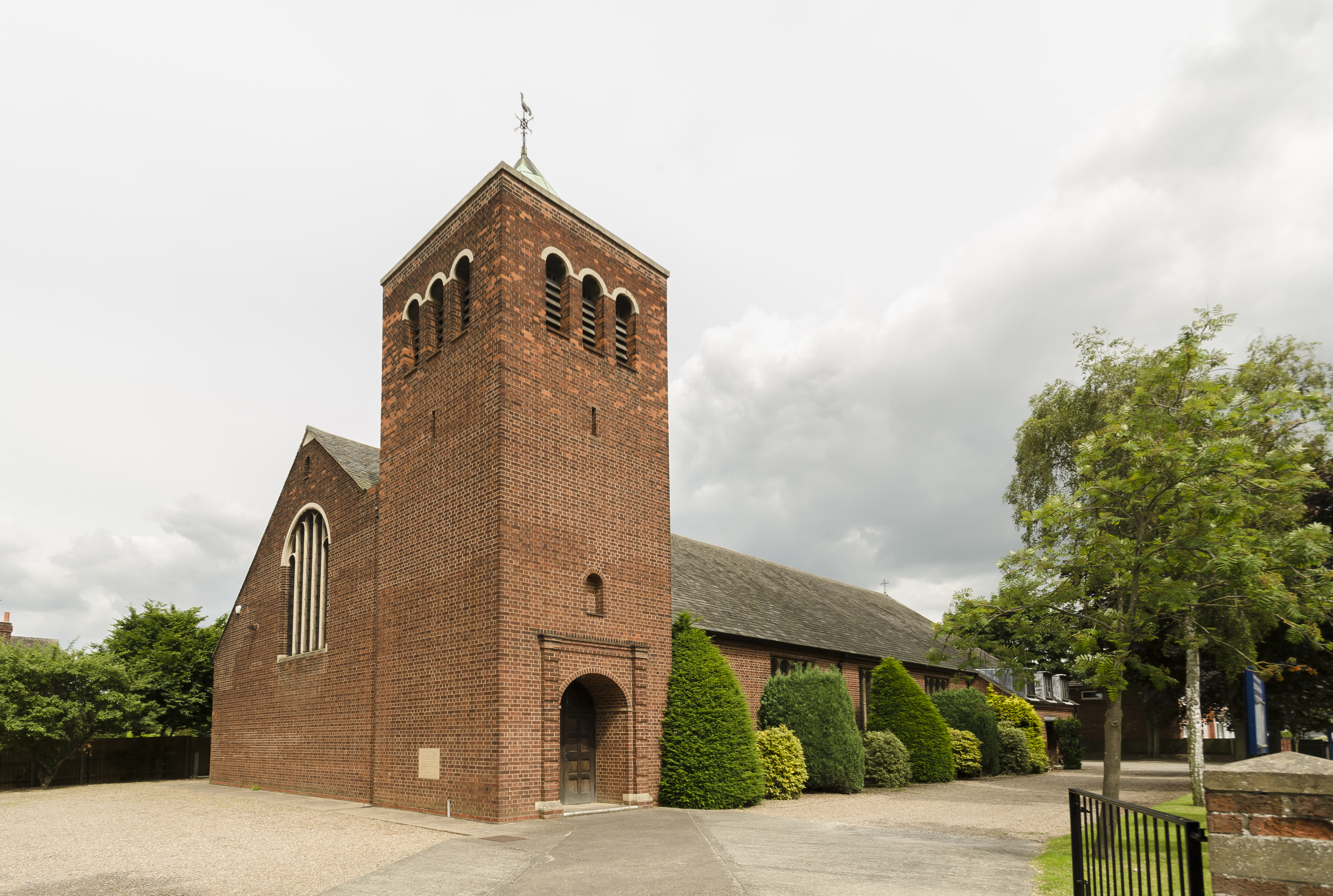
Holy Cross Church, Boultham

Boultham Mere, created in 1989, is a nature reserve near a railway line and managed by the Lincolnshire Wildlife Trust. It has a colony of Variable Damselfly.

The ecclesiastical parish of Boultham covers most of Lincoln west of the River Witham near Lincoln High Street, and part of Lincoln City Centre. The northern boundary is defined by Brayford Pool and the Fossdyke as far as Carholme golf course. The district includes the suburbs of Hartsholme, New Boultham and Swanpool. Tritton Road runs through the centre of Boultham.

The Grade II* listed St Helen's Church is used for occasional services and the newer building of Holy Cross church is used for routine worship, within the Anglican Boultham Parish.

The area is home to Lincoln Central Mosque and Cultural Centre and multiple retail parks.

== Governance ==
Boultham ward in 2016

Boultham gives its name to two areas for local elections:

- An electoral division which elects one member of Lincolnshire County Council. This extends west to include Swanpool and east to include St Catherine's, and streets north of Bracebridge.
- An electoral ward which elects three members of the City of Lincoln Council. This includes Swanpool and excludes St Catherine, and extends north to include New Boultham. The ward had a population of 11,258 at the 2021 census.

== Demographics ==
At the 2021 census, the ethnicity and religious composition of the ward was:

Boultham: Ethnicity: 2021 Census
Ethnic group	Population	%
White	9,845	87.4%
Asian or Asian British	697	6.2%
Black or Black British	275	2.4%
Mixed	240	2.1%
Other Ethnic Group	137	1.2%
Arab	64	0.6%
Total	11,258	100%

Boultham: Religion: 2021 Census
Religious	Population	%
Irreligious	5,614	55.2%
Christian	4,044	39.8%
Muslim	269	2.6%
Other religion	84	0.8%
Hindu	69	0.7%
Buddhist	44	0.4%
Sikh	30	0.3%
Jewish	11	0.1%
Total	11,258	100%
