= Boultham Moor =

Suburb in the district of the City of Lincoln, Lincolnshire, England

Coordinates: 53.21042°N 0.56391°W

- Location within Lincolnshire
- OS grid reference: SK960691
- District: City of Lincoln
- Shire county: Lincolnshire
- Region: East Midlands
- Country: England
- Sovereign state: United Kingdom
- Post town: LINCOLN
- Postcode district: LN6 7
- Dialling code: 01522
- Police: Lincolnshire
- Fire: Lincolnshire
- Ambulance: East Midlands
- UK Parliament: Lincoln

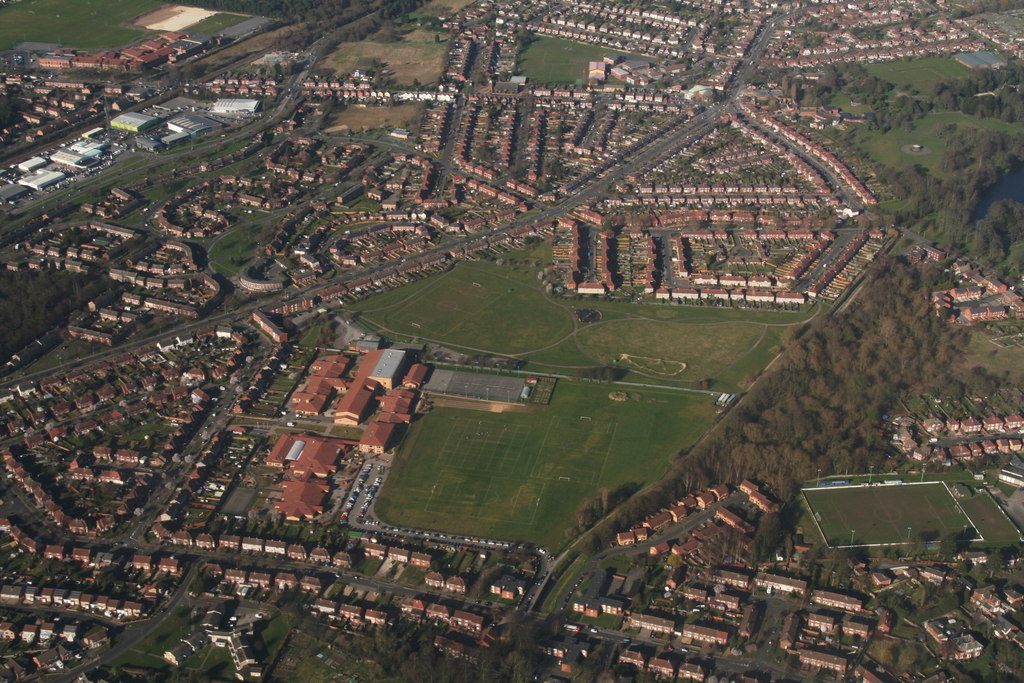
Aerial photo of subject

Boultham Moor is a suburb (and former village) in the district of the City of Lincoln, Lincolnshire, England.

== Geography ==
The suburb lies within the parish of Boultham, which is the name of the suburb directly to the north. Boultham Moor covers the southern area of Boultham parish with Skellingthorpe Road to the north, Rookery Lane to the east, Newark Road (A1434) and Doddington Road (B1190) to the south and the Lincoln-Newark railway (and Hartsholme) to the west. Swallow Beck is the name of the area in the south of Boultham Moor.

To the east is Boultham Park, near the River Witham. Boultham Hall was demolished in 1959. The main road through the estate is Moorland Avenue, which becomes Boultham Park Road at the roundabout near the shops. Also to the west is Tritton Road (B1003). Moorland Avenue used to be the main road into Lincoln, before Tritton Road was built in the 1970s.

== History ==
=== 1943 Avro Lancaster crash ===
At 24 Highfield Avenue, off Skellingthorpe Road, Avro Lancaster ED833 crashed at 5pm on 11 June 1943. Ten people were killed, four of them civilians.

Six out of the seven aircrew were killed. Sergeant C. Henry Malkin, the rear gunner, survived, being found outside 18 Royden Grove. The aircrew who perished included Sgt Edwin Kirk, of Rainworth in north Nottinghamshire, and Sgt Pilot William Featherstone (24 November 1919 - 1943), who attended the Queen Elizabeth's school in Mansfield, of Deepdale Gardens, Sutton-in-Ashfield and Sgt Ernest Roy Broad, aged 20, from Baldock

=== Construction ===
The area was built as a large council estate in the 1950s, along with nearby Hartsholme.

The parish church, Holy Cross on Skellingthorpe Road, was built in the Second World War. It is also the parish church for Boultham. Local pubs include the Peter de Wint, named after Peter De Wint who married a local woman and lived in the uphill part of Lincoln. It is now the Crown and Arrows. Many road names on the estate are named after English artists, such as Charles Haslewood Shannon, J. M. W. Turner, John Romney, Joshua Reynolds, William Kilburn, Thomas Lawrence, Thomas Webster, John Sell Cotman and John Constable.

== Education ==
Boultham Moor has a comprehensive secondary school, Priory Witham Academy. The new buildings stand on the former sports fields of what was previously known as the Boultham Moor Girls Church of England Secondary Modern School until 1974 when it was renamed the Ancaster High School. From 1998 it was renamed again as the Joseph Ruston Technology College.
