= Nigel Huddleston =

British politician (born 1970)

Nigel Huddleston MP
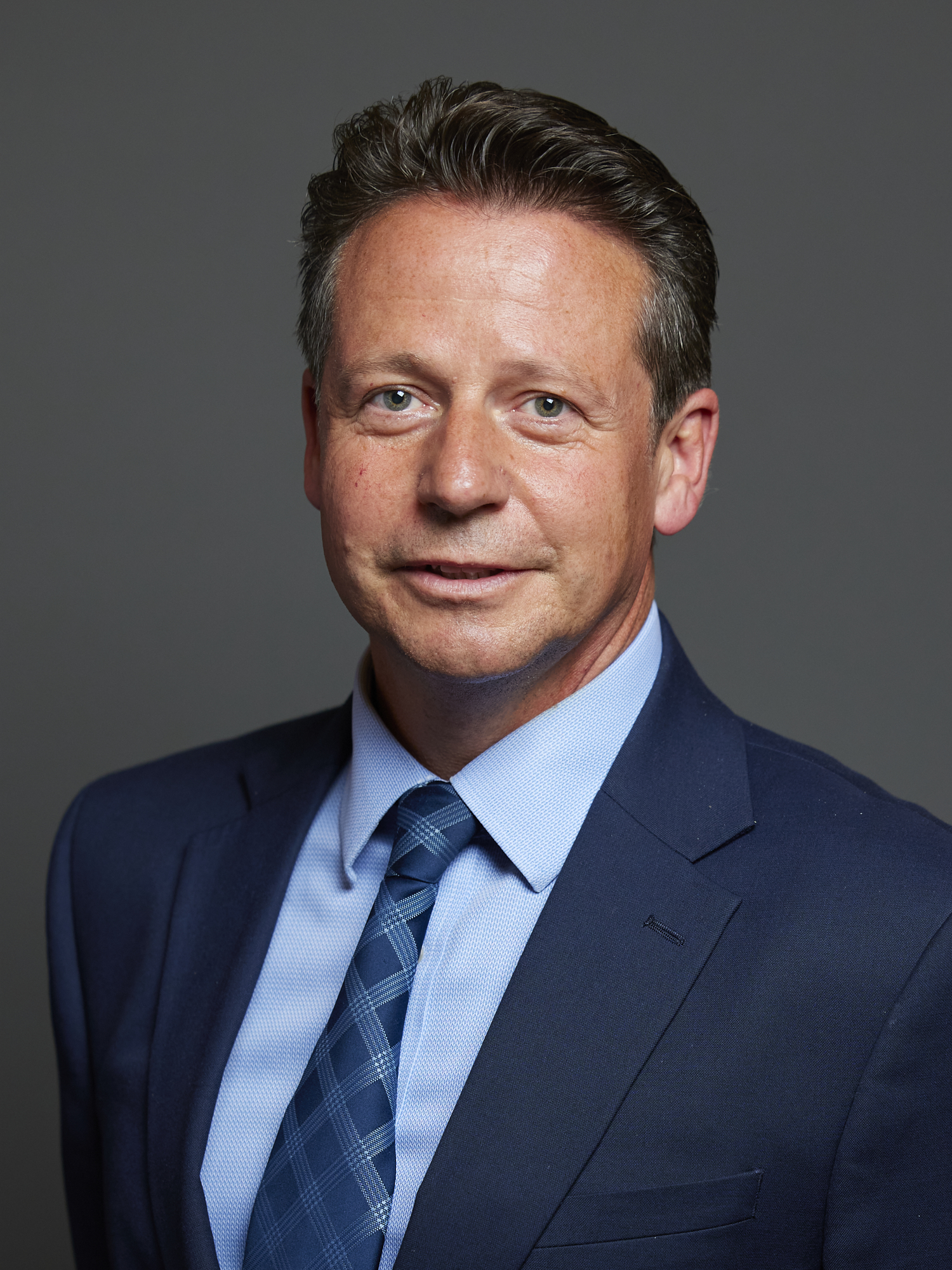
- Official portrait, 2024

Shadow Secretary of State for Culture, Media and Sport
- In office 22 July 2025 – 31 August 2026
- Leader: Kemi Badenoch
- Preceded by: Stuart Andrew
- Succeeded by: Rebecca Paul

Co-Chairman of the Conservative Party
- In office 4 November 2024 – 22 July 2025 Serving with The Lord Johnson of Lainston
- Leader: Kemi Badenoch
- Preceded by: Richard Fuller
- Succeeded by: Kevin Hollinrake

Shadow Financial Secretary to the Treasury
- In office 19 July 2024 – 4 November 2024
- Leader: Rishi Sunak
- Preceded by: James Murray
- Succeeded by: Gareth Davies

Financial Secretary to the Treasury
- In office 13 November 2023 – 5 July 2024
- Prime Minister: Rishi Sunak
- Preceded by: Victoria Atkins
- Succeeded by: Lord Livermore

Minister of State for International Trade (Note: Parliamentary Under-Secretary of State (2022–2023).)
- In office 30 October 2022 – 13 November 2023
- Prime Minister: Rishi Sunak
- Preceded by: James Duddridge
- Succeeded by: Greg Hands (Note: As Minister of State for Trade Policy)

Lord Commissioner of the Treasury
- In office 20 September 2022 – 7 February 2023
- Prime Minister: Liz Truss; Rishi Sunak
- Succeeded by: Stuart Anderson

Parliamentary Under-Secretary of State for Sport, Tourism, Heritage and Civil Society (Note: As Parliamentary Under-Secretary of State for Sport, Tourism and Heritage from 2020 to 2021. Huddleston served as Parliamentary Under-Secretary of State for Sport and Tourism from February to October 2021. The former role of Minister for Civil Society was held by The Baroness Barran until the role was abolished.)
- In office 13 February 2020 – 7 September 2022
- Preceded by: Nigel Adams (Note: As Minister of State for Sport, Media and Creative Industries.); Helen Whately (Note: As Parliamentary Under-Secretary of State for Arts, Heritage and Tourism.)

Member of Parliament for Droitwich and Evesham Mid Worcestershire (2015–2024)
- Incumbent
- Assumed office 7 May 2015
- Preceded by: Peter Luff
- Majority: 8,995 (18.1%)

Personal details
- Born: Nigel Paul Huddleston; 13 October 1970 (age 56) Lincoln, Lincolnshire, England
- Party: Conservative
- Spouse: Melissa Peters (m. 1999)
- Children: 2
- Education: Christ Church, Oxford (BA); University of California, Los Angeles (MBA)
- Website: nigelhuddleston.com

Nigel Paul Huddleston (born 13 October 1970) is a British politician who was Shadow Secretary of State for Culture, Media and Sport from 2025 to 2026. He has been the Member of Parliament (MP) for Droitwich and Evesham, previously Mid Worcestershire, since 2015 and was Financial Secretary to the Treasury from November 2023 to July 2024.

He previously served as Parliamentary Under-Secretary of State at the Department for Digital, Culture, Media and Sport from 2020 to 2022 and as Minister of State for International Trade from February to November 2023.

== Early life and career ==
His parents Alan George Huddleston married Pauline Franklin on Saturday 27 November 1965 at Holy Cross Church in Boultham Moor.

Nigel Huddleston was born on 13 October 1970 in Lincoln. He was educated at the Sir Robert Pattinson Academy, a state secondary school in North Hykeham in Lincolnshire, followed by Christ Church, Oxford, where he studied politics and economics. He received an MBA from the UCLA Anderson School of Management in Los Angeles, California.

Huddleston started his career as a consultant for Arthur Andersen. He continued his career at Deloitte, and later worked as the industry head of travel for Google.

== Parliamentary career ==
At the 2010 general election, Huddleston was the Conservative candidate for Luton South, coming second with 29.4% of the vote behind the Labour candidate Gavin Shuker.

In 2014, he was selected as the prospective parliamentary candidate in Mid Worcestershire in a primary election in which anyone on the constituency's electoral register was eligible to vote. The constituency association did not publish the votes that each candidate received. Huddleston was elected as MP for Mid Worcestershire at the 2015 general election with 57% of the vote and a majority of 20,532.

Huddleston is a board member of the Tory Reform Group. In Parliament, he sat on the Culture, Media and Sport Select Committee.

Huddleston was opposed to Brexit prior to the 2016 referendum on EU membership.

At the snap 2017 general election, Huddleston was re-elected as MP for Mid Worcestershire with an increased vote share of 65.3% and an increased majority of 23,326.

In February 2019, Huddleston was appointed as the Conservatives' new vice chairman for youth. He was responsible for attracting young people to the party's ranks. After Boris Johnson became Prime Minister in July 2019, Huddleston was appointed as an assistant whip, leaving his role as vice chairman.

Huddleston was again re-elected at the 2019 general election with an increased vote share of 66.7% and an increased majority of 28,018.

In the 2020 cabinet reshuffle, Huddleston was appointed Parliamentary Under-Secretary of State for Sport, Tourism and Heritage, replacing Nigel Adams and Helen Whately. During 2021, he served as Parliamentary Under-Secretary of State for Sport and Tourism. On 8 October 2021, Huddleston took over the duties of the former role of Parliamentary under-secretary of state for civil society, held by The Baroness Barran until the role was abolished. Huddleston then became Parliamentary Under-Secretary of State for Sport, Tourism, Heritage and Civil Society.

Following the 2023 review of Westminster constituencies, Huddleston's constituency of Mid Worcestershire was abolished and replaced with Droitwich and Evesham. At the 2024 general election, Huddleston was elected to Parliament as MP for Droitwich and Evesham with 40.1% of the vote and a majority of 8,995. He served as co-chairman of the Conservative Party from November 2024 until July 2025, alongside Dominic Johnson, Baron Johnson of Lainston.

== Personal life ==
Huddleston lives in Badsey, Worcestershire, with his American wife Melissa, and their two children. He was married in December 1999 at St Hugh's Church, Lincoln to Melissa Peters.

== Notes ==
Parliament of the United Kingdom
Preceded by Peter Luff	Member of Parliament for Mid Worcestershire; 2015–2024	Constituency abolished
New constituency	Member of Parliament for Droitwich and Evesham; 2024–present	Incumbent
Political offices
Preceded by Nigel Adams as Minister of State for Sport, Media and Creative Industries; Helen Whately as Parliamentary Under-Secretary of State for Arts, Heritage and Tourism	Parliamentary Under-Secretary of State for Sport, Tourism and Heritage; 2020–2021	Succeeded by Himself as Parliamentary Under-Secretary of State for Sport and Tourism
Preceded by Himself as Parliamentary Under-Secretary of State for Sport, Tourism and Heritage	Parliamentary Under-Secretary of State for Sport and Tourism; 2021	Succeeded by Himself as Parliamentary Under-Secretary of State for Sport, Tourism, Heritage and Civil Society
Preceded by Himself as Parliamentary Under-Secretary of State for Sport and Tourism; The Baroness Barran as Parliamentary Under-Secretary of State for Civil Society	Parliamentary Under-Secretary of State for Sport, Tourism, Heritage and Civil Society; 2021–2022	Succeeded by Stuart Andrew
Party political offices
Preceded by Richard Fuller	Chairman of the Conservative Party; 2024–2025; With: The Lord Johnson of Lainston	Succeeded by Kevin Hollinrake
