= 2020 British cabinet reshuffle =

First cabinet reshuffle undertaken by UK Prime Minister Boris Johnson

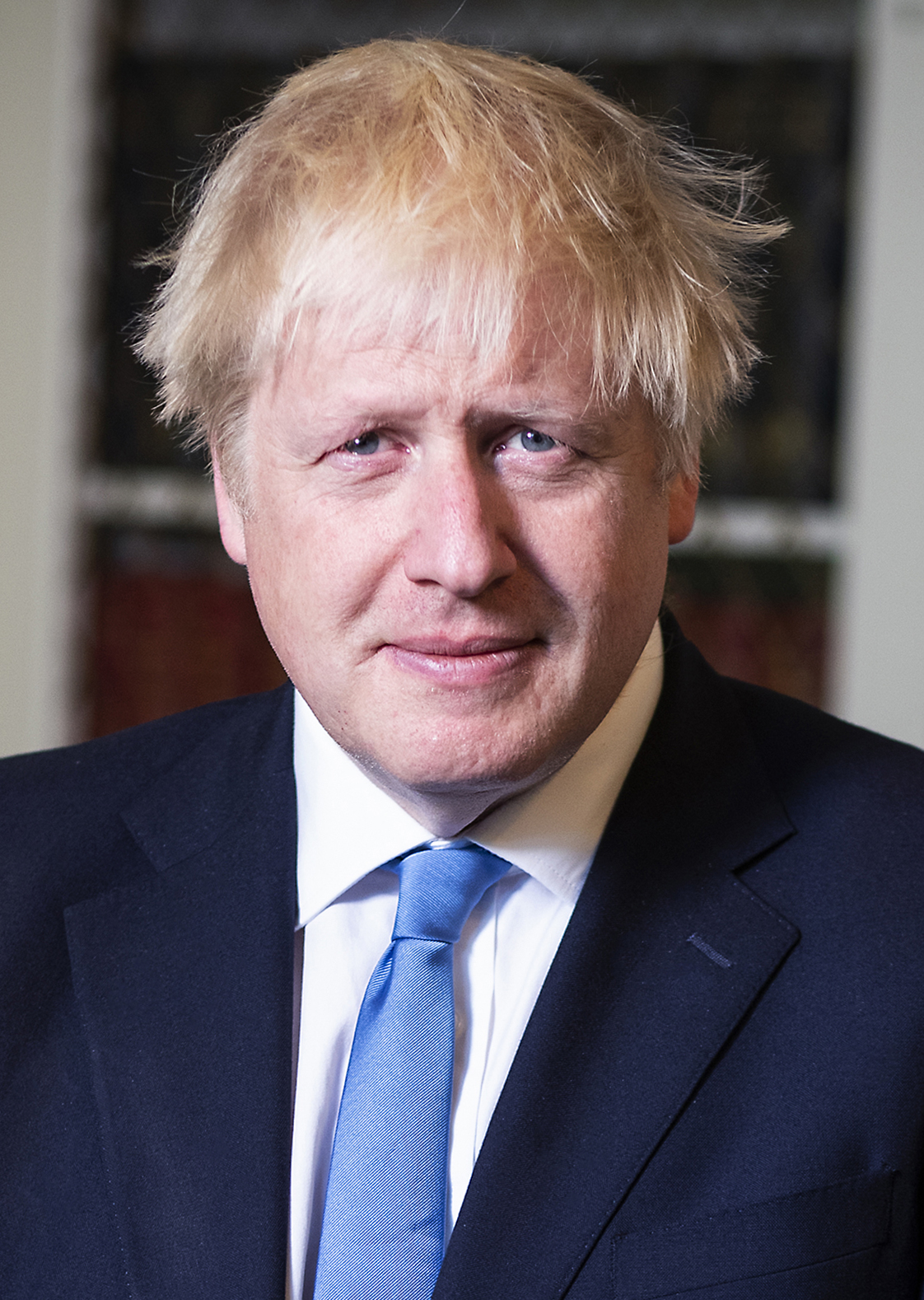
Boris Johnson

Boris Johnson carried out the first significant reshuffle of his majority government on 13 February 2020. Following the December 2019 general election, there was considerable speculation that Johnson was planning a major reshuffle of the Cabinet, to take place after the United Kingdom's official withdrawal from the European Union on 31 January 2020. There were reports that up to a third of the Cabinet would be dismissed, Whitehall departments abolished and civil servants replaced by policy experts; however, the reshuffle was smaller than expected and no departments were abolished. The anticipated reshuffle was nicknamed "The St Valentine's Day Massacre" in the press, due to its proximity to St Valentine's Day, the name being a reference to the 1929 gangland shooting in Chicago.

Johnson formed his first ministry on 24 July 2019, following his election as Leader of the Conservative Party and subsequent appointment as Prime Minister of the United Kingdom. In September 2019, he carried out small reshuffles in response to the resignations of two Cabinet ministers (Jo Johnson and Amber Rudd). After the Conservative Party's victory in the 2019 general election, Johnson's only change had been to fill the position left vacant by Alun Cairns' resignation in the previous month.

On 13 February 2020, Johnson reshuffled the government. Five Cabinet ministers were sacked, including the Northern Ireland Secretary Julian Smith, a decision that was criticised by several politicians and commentators following Smith's success in restoring the devolved Northern Ireland Executive under the terms of the New Decade, New Approach agreement. Chancellor of the Exchequer Sajid Javid resigned from the Cabinet after refusing Johnson's demand that he dismiss his advisers.

This was the last major cabinet reshuffle before the COVID-19 pandemic in the United Kingdom, and was followed by two more reshuffles in 2021 and 2022.

== Cabinet-level changes ==
Colour key
- Joined the Cabinet
- Left the Cabinet

Minister	Position before reshuffle	Result of reshuffle
Rt Hon The Baroness Morgan of Cotes PC	Secretary of State for Digital, Culture, Media and Sport	Left the government (intention to stand down announced in January 2020)
Rt Hon Oliver Dowden CBE MP	Minister for the Cabinet Office; Paymaster General	Became Secretary of State for Digital, Culture, Media and Sport
Rt Hon Michael Gove MP	Chancellor of the Duchy of Lancaster	Given additional role as Minister for the Cabinet Office
Rt Hon Julian Smith CBE MP	Secretary of State for Northern Ireland	Left the government
Rt Hon Brandon Lewis CBE MP	Minister of State for Security and Deputy for EU Exit and No Deal Preparation	Became Secretary of State for Northern Ireland
Rt Hon Esther McVey MP	Minister of State for Housing and Planning	Left the government
Rt Hon Andrea Leadsom MP	Secretary of State for Business, Energy and Industrial Strategy	Left the government
Rt Hon Alok Sharma MP	Secretary of State for International Development	Became Secretary of State for Business, Energy and Industrial Strategy
Anne-Marie Trevelyan MP	Minister of State for the Armed Forces	Became Secretary of State for International Development
Rt Hon Geoffrey Cox QC MP	Attorney General for England and Wales; Advocate General for Northern Ireland	Left the government
Suella Braverman MP	Backbench MP	Became Attorney General for England and Wales and Advocate General for Northern Ireland
Rt Hon Theresa Villiers MP	Secretary of State for Environment, Food and Rural Affairs	Left the government
George Eustice MP	Minister of State for Agriculture, Fisheries and Food	Became Secretary of State for Environment, Food and Rural Affairs
Rt Hon Sajid Javid MP	Chancellor of the Exchequer	Resigned after refusing to dismiss his advisers
Rt Hon Rishi Sunak MP	Chief Secretary to the Treasury	Became Chancellor of the Exchequer
Rt Hon Steve Barclay MP	Backbench MP, previously Secretary of State for Exiting the European Union until January 31, 2020	Became Chief Secretary to the Treasury
Rt Hon James Cleverly TD VR MP	Minister without Portfolio (Chairman of the Conservative Party) (Note: Non-ministerial position)	Left the Cabinet; became Minister of State for the Middle East & North Africa and International Development
Amanda Milling MP	Deputy Chief Government Whip Treasurer of the Household	Became Minister without Portfolio (and Chairman of the Conservative Party)
Rt Hon Jake Berry MP	Minister of State for the Northern Powerhouse	Resigned after refusing a new position at the Foreign and Commonwealth Office

== Junior ministerial changes ==
Colour key
- Promoted (Note: According to the ministerial pay scale: Parliamentary Private Secretary < Parliamentary Under-Secretary of State < Minister of State)
- Left the government

Minister	Position before reshuffle	Result of reshuffle
Rt Hon Chris Skidmore FRHistS FSA FRSA MP	Minister of State for Universities, Science, Research and Innovation	Left the government
Michelle Donelan MP	Backbench MP	Became Minister of State for Universities, Science, Research and Innovation
George Freeman MP	Minister of State for Transport	Left the government
Andrew Stephenson MP	Minister of State for Africa and International Development	Became Minister of State for Transport
Nigel Adams MP	Minister of State for Sport, Media & Creative Industries	Became Minister of State for Africa and International Development
Caroline Dinenage MP	Minister of State for Social Care	Became Minister of State for Sport, Media & Creative Industries
Helen Whately MP	Parliamentary Under-Secretary of State for the Arts, Heritage and Tourism	Became Minister of State for Social Care
Nigel Huddleston MP	Backbench MP	Became Parliamentary Under-Secretary of State for the Arts, Heritage and Tourism
Rt Hon John Whittingdale OBE MP	Backbench MP	Became Minister of State for Digital, Culture, Media and Sport
Nus Ghani MP	Parliamentary Under-Secretary of State for Transport	Left the government
Kelly Tolhurst MP	Parliamentary Under-Secretary of State for Business, Energy and Industrial Strategy	Became Parliamentary Under-Secretary of State for Transport
Paul Scully MP	Backbench MP	Became Parliamentary Under-Secretary of State for Business, Energy and Industrial Strategy and Minister for London
Chris Philp MP	Minister for London	Became Parliamentary Under-Secretary for Home Affairs
James Heappey MP	Backbench MP	Became Minister of State for the Armed Forces
Rt Hon Dr Andrew Murrison MP	Minister of State for International Development and the Middle East	Left the government
Rt Hon Penny Mordaunt MP	Backbench MP	Became Paymaster General
Rt Hon Christopher Pincher MP	Minister of State for Europe and the Americas	Became Minister of State for Housing, Communities and Local Government
Rt Hon James Brokenshire MP	Backbench MP	Became Minister of State for Security
Jeremy Quin MP	Parliamentary Secretary for the Cabinet Office	Became Minister of State for Defence Procurement
Julia Lopez MP	Backbench MP	Became Parliamentary Secretary for the Cabinet Office
Chloe Smith MP	Parliamentary Secretary for the Cabinet Office	Became Minister of State for the Cabinet Office
Robin Walker MP	Parliamentary Under-Secretary of State for Northern Ireland	Became Minister of State for Northern Ireland
Heather Wheeler MP	Parliamentary Under-Secretary of State for Foreign and Commonwealth Affairs	Left the government
Wendy Morton MP	Parliamentary Under-Secretary of State for Justice	Became Parliamentary Under-Secretary of State for Foreign and Commonwealth Affairs and International Development as Minister for European Neighbourhood and the Americas
James Duddridge MP	Backbench MP	Became Parliamentary Under-Secretary of State for Foreign and Commonwealth Affairs and International Development
Alex Chalk MP	Backbench MP	Became Parliamentary Under-Secretary of State for Justice
Victoria Prentis MP	Parliamentary Private Secretary to the Leader of the House of Commons	Became Parliamentary Under-Secretary of State for Environment, Food and Rural Affairs
Amanda Solloway MP	Backbench MP	Became Parliamentary Under Secretary of State for Science, Research and Innovation
Paul Maynard MP	Parliamentary Under-Secretary of State for Transport	Left the government
Rachel Maclean MP	Parliamentary Private Secretary to the Chancellor of the Exchequer	Became Parliamentary Under-Secretary of State for Transport
Gillian Keegan MP	Parliamentary Private Secretary to the Secretary of State for Health and Social Care	Became Parliamentary Under-Secretary of State for Education
Simon Clarke MP	Exchequer Secretary to the Treasury	Became Minister of State for the Northern Powerhouse
Kemi Badenoch MP	Parliamentary Under-Secretary of State for Children and Families	Became Exchequer Secretary to the Treasury and Parliamentary Under-Secretary of State for International Trade
Vicky Ford MP	Backbench MP	Became Parliamentary Under-Secretary of State for Children and Families
Kit Malthouse MP	Minister of State for Crime, Policing and the Fire Service	Given additional position as Minister of State for Justice
The Lord Goldsmith of Richmond Park	Minister of State for the Environment	Given additional position as Minister of State for Pacific
The Lord Agnew of Oulton	Parliamentary Under-Secretary of State for the School System	Became Minister of State for Efficiency and Transformation
The Lord True	Backbench Peer	Became Minister of State for European Union Relations and Constitutional Policy

== Whips' Office appointments ==
Whip	Previous position	New position
Stuart Andrew MP	Vice-Chamberlain of the Household	Deputy Chief Government Whip; Treasurer of the Household
Marcus Jones MP	Assistant Government Whip	Vice-Chamberlain of the Household
James Morris MP	Assistant Government Whip	Lord Commissioner of the Treasury
Michael Tomlinson MP	Backbencher	Lord Commissioner of the Treasury
Alex Chalk MP	Backbencher	Assistant Government Whip
Eddie Hughes MP	Backbencher	Assistant Government Whip
The Viscount Younger of Leckie	Backbencher	Lord-in-waiting; Government Whip
The Baroness Scott of Bybrook	Backbencher	Baroness-in-Waiting; Government Whip

== Reaction ==
=== Dismissal of Julian Smith ===
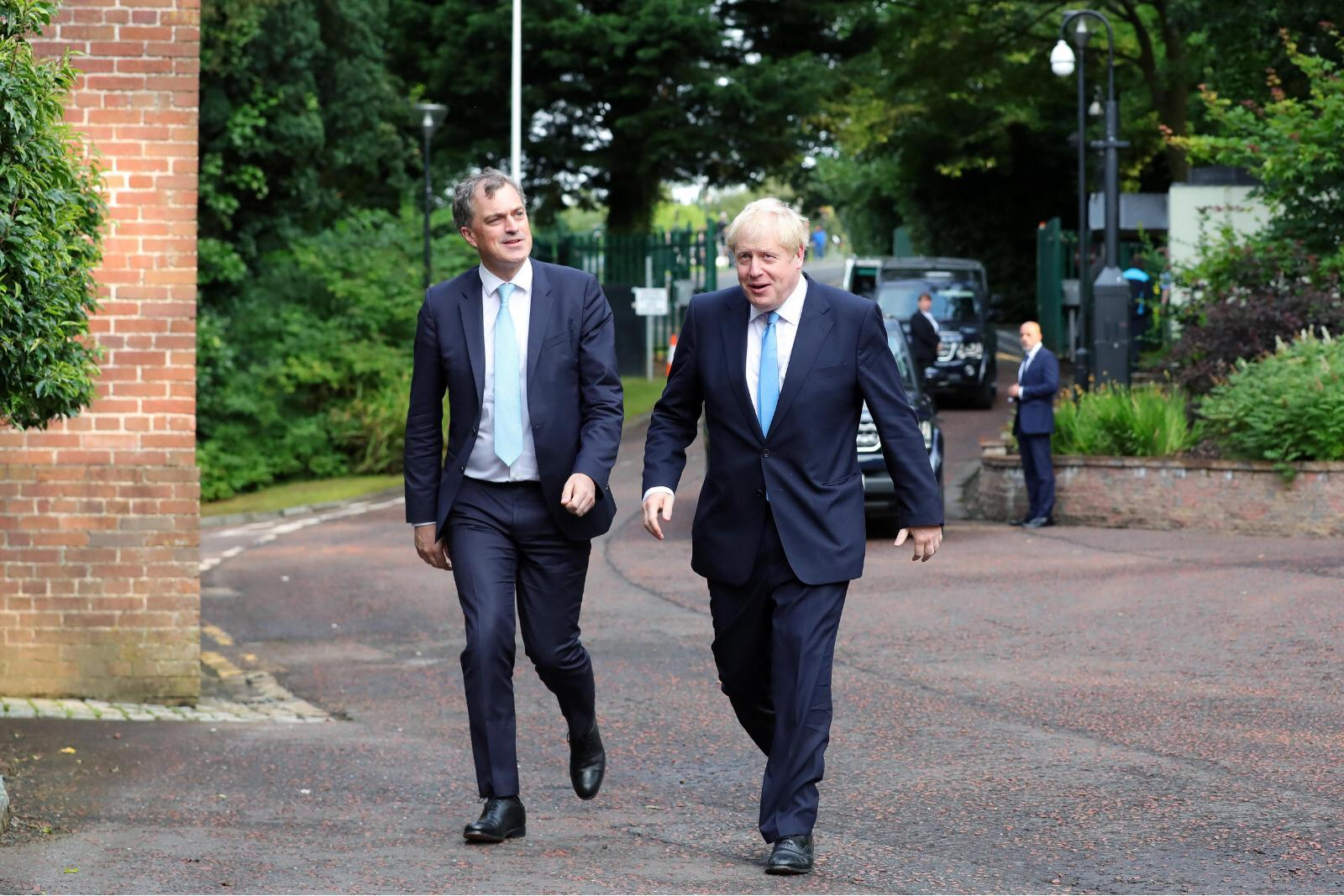
Smith (left) and Johnson (right) visit Northern Ireland in July 2019

The decision to dismiss Julian Smith as Secretary of State for Northern Ireland was criticised by a number of prominent political figures in Northern Ireland, including SDLP leader Colum Eastwood who described the move as showing "dangerous indifference" by the Prime Minister. Smith had been widely seen as instrumental in securing a cross-party deal to restore the Northern Ireland Executive, the New Decade, New Approach agreement, after three years without a devolved government in Stormont. Tributes to Smith's tenure as Northern Ireland Secretary were paid by NI First Minister Arlene Foster and Taoiseach Leo Varadkar. Both praised him for his role in ending the political deadlock in the country.

Many political commentators expressed their surprise at Smith's dismissal, given his perceived success during his time as Secretary of State for Northern Ireland. Some suggested that Smith's testimony to the Northern Ireland Affairs Select Committee in October 2019, in which he described a potential no-deal Brexit as being "a very, very bad idea for Northern Ireland", had influenced the decision to remove him from his position. Stephen Bush, political editor of the New Statesman, speculated that the consequence of Johnson's removal of Smith would be the destabilisation of the new power-sharing agreement and increased difficulty in negotiating the details of the "New Protocol".

=== Resignation of Sajid Javid ===
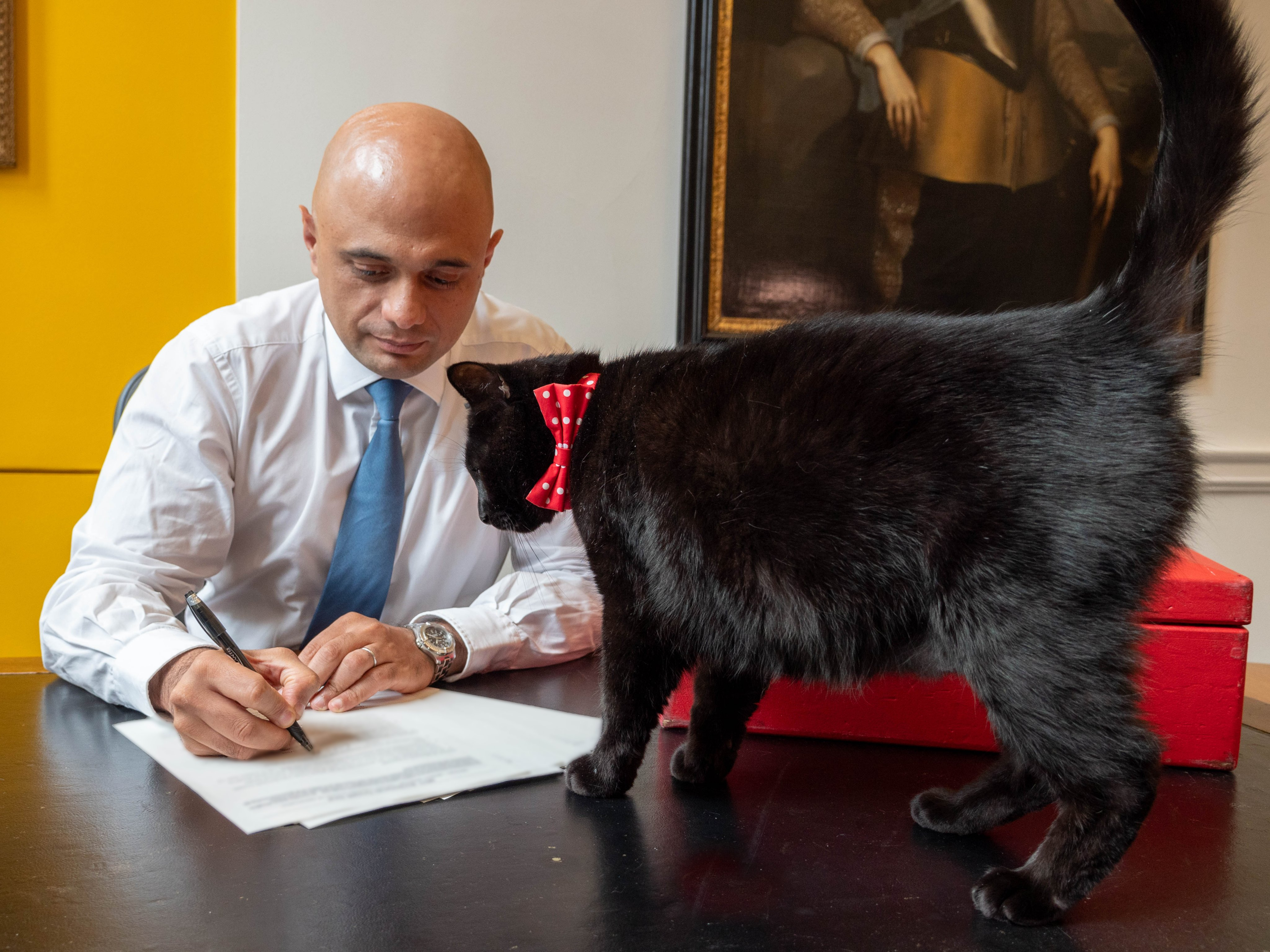
Javid with Gladstone, Chief Mouser to HM Treasury

Tensions between 10 Downing Street and the Treasury had come to a head in August 2019, when the Prime Minister's Chief Special Adviser Dominic Cummings dismissed one of Chancellor Sajid Javid's aides, Sonia Khan, without Javid's permission and without informing him. It was alleged that, during her dismissal, Cummings "went outside No 10 and asked an armed officer to enter the building and escort Khan off the premises." In November 2019, following questions of a rift between the two men, Johnson gave his assurance that he would retain Javid as Chancellor after the 2019 general election.

However, in the weeks leading up to the reshuffle, a number of briefings in the press had suggested that a new economic ministry led by Rishi Sunak might be established, to reduce the power and political influence of the Treasury. Sunak was considered to be a Johnson loyalist, seen as the "rising star" minister who had ably represented the Prime Minister during the 2019 election debates. By February 2020, it was reported that Javid would remain in his role as Chancellor and that Sunak would stay on as Chief Secretary to the Treasury, in order to "keep an eye" on Javid.

On 13 February 2020, the day of the reshuffle, Javid resigned as Chancellor of the Exchequer, following a meeting with the Prime Minister. During the meeting, Johnson had offered to allow Javid to keep his position on the condition that he dismiss all his advisers at the Treasury and replace them with ones selected by 10 Downing Street. Upon resigning, Javid told the Press Association that "no self-respecting minister would accept those terms".

The Chancellor's resignation had been unexpected, given Johnson's commitment to keep him in the Cabinet and recent reports that a rival finance ministry would not be created. Robert Shrimsley, chief political commentator of the Financial Times, warned that the Prime Minister's handling of his relationship with Javid could damage the government. He argued that "good government often depends on senior ministers – and the chancellor in particular – being able to fight bad ideas. Mr Johnson's cabinet has just seen the price of defiance".

== See also ==
- 2021 British cabinet reshuffle
- Second Johnson ministry
- Premiership of Boris Johnson
- List of departures from the second Johnson ministry
- 2020 in politics and government
