= Parliamentary Under-Secretary of State for Sport, Tourism, Place and Digital Government =

Position in British government

United Kingdom Parliamentary Under-Secretary of State for Sport, Tourism, Place and Digital Government
- Royal Arms of His Majesty's Government

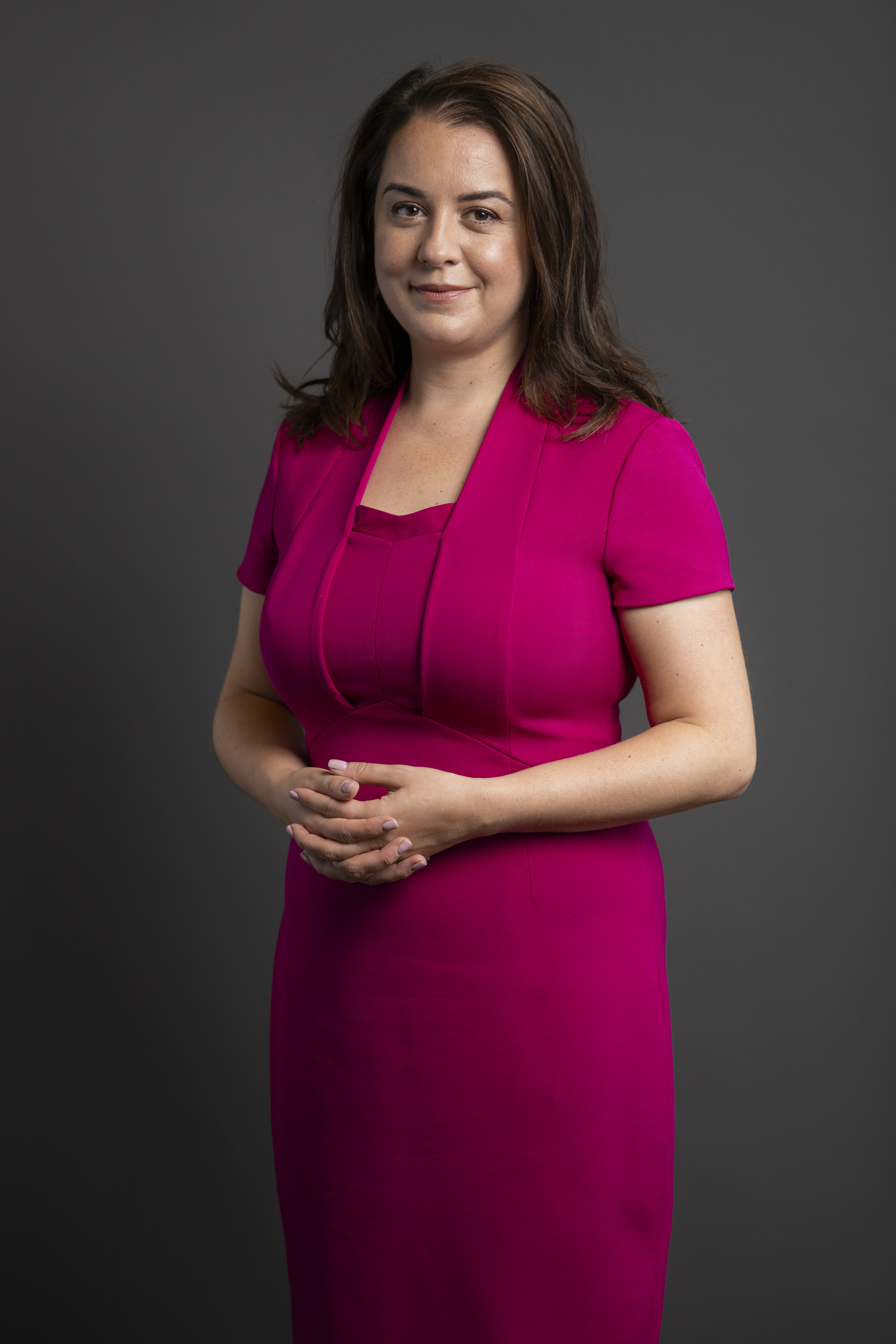
- Incumbent; Stephanie Peacock since 9 July 2024
- Department for Culture, Media and Sport
- Appointer: The Monarch (on the advice of the Prime Minister)
- Term length: At His Majesty's pleasure
- Formation: 2015
- First holder: Tracey Crouch
- Website: www.gov.uk/government/ministers/parliamentary-under-secretary-of-state--271

The Parliamentary Under-Secretary of State for Sport, Tourism, Place and Digital Government is a junior position in the Department for Culture, Media and Sport in the British government. The incumbent is Stephanie Peacock. The position was created by the Second May ministry after the 2017 general election. The role is a successor of the Minister for Tourism and Heritage which was abolished in 2012 after the 2012 Summer Olympics in London. The position gained the portfolio of the former Minister for Sport and Civil Society in 2020.

== Responsibilities ==
The minister has responsibility of the following policy areas:

- Sport
- Tourism
- Civil society
- Youth
- Loneliness and social connection
- Impact Economy
- Ceremonials

== List of ministers ==
Office formed out of Minister for Sport and Civil Society and Minister for Tourism and Heritage

Parliamentary Under-Secretary	Took office	Left office	Political party	Prime Minister
=== Parliamentary Under-Secretary of State for Sport, Heritage and Tourism ===
Tracey Crouch; MP for Chatham and Aylesford	12 May 2015	15 June 2017	Conservative	David Cameron
Tracey Crouch; MP for Chatham and Aylesford	12 May 2015	15 June 2017	Conservative	Theresa May
=== Parliamentary Under-Secretary of State for Arts, Heritage and Tourism ===
John Glen; MP for Salisbury	14 June 2017	8 January 2018	Conservative	Theresa May
Michael Ellis; MP for Northampton North	8 January 2018	23 May 2019	Conservative	Theresa May
Rebecca Pow; MP for Taunton Deane	23 May 2019	10 September 2019	Conservative	Theresa May
Rebecca Pow; MP for Taunton Deane	23 May 2019	10 September 2019	Conservative	Boris Johnson
Helen Whately; MP for Faversham and Mid Kent	10 September 2019	13 February 2020	Conservative	Boris Johnson
=== Parliamentary Under-Secretary of State for Sport, Tourism, Heritage and Civil Society ===
Nigel Huddleston; MP for Mid Worcestershire	13 February 2020	7 September 2022	Conservative	Boris Johnson
=== Parliamentary Under-Secretary of State for Sport, Arts and Ceremonials ===
Stuart Andrew; MP for Pudsey	20 September 2022	27 October 2022	Conservative	Liz Truss
Role combined with Minister for Civil Society === Parliamentary Under-Secretary of State for Sport, Tourism and Civil Society ===
Stuart Andrew; MP for Pudsey	27 October 2022	7 February 2023	Conservative	Rishi Sunak
=== Parliamentary Under-Secretary of State for Sport, Gambling and Civil Society ===
Stuart Andrew; MP for Pudsey	7 February 2023	5 July 2024	Conservative	Rishi Sunak
Parliamentary Under-Secretary of State for Sport, Media, Civil Society and Youth (until September 2025) Parliamentary Under-Secretary of State for Sport, Tourism, Civil Society and Youth (September 2025–July 2026) Parliamentary Under-Secretary of State for Sport, Tourism, Place and Digital Government (from July 2026)
Stephanie Peacock; MP for Barnsley South	9 July 2024	Incumbent	Labour	Keir Starmer; Andy Burnham
