= Minister for Tourism and Heritage =

Former UK government position

The post of minister for tourism and heritage was a former junior position in the cabinet of the United Kingdom with responsibilities of handling the tourism industry and the heritage and history of England. The Minister of Tourism and Heritage was located within the portfolio of the Department for Culture, Media and Sport.

The post was at Parliamentary Under Secretary of State level. The former minister of tourism and heritage was John Penrose.

Since the September 2012 reshuffle the responsibilities were split with heritage going to the Minister for Culture, Communications and Creative Industries and the tourism and licensing responsibilities going to the Minister for Sport and Tourism which is now at the Minister of State level.

In 2017, the powers were transferred to a newly formed position: Parliamentary Under Secretary of State for Arts, Heritage and Tourism.

== See also ==
- History of England
- Tourism in England
