= List of departures from the second Johnson ministry =

UK ministers resigning from Johnson's second government outside reshuffles

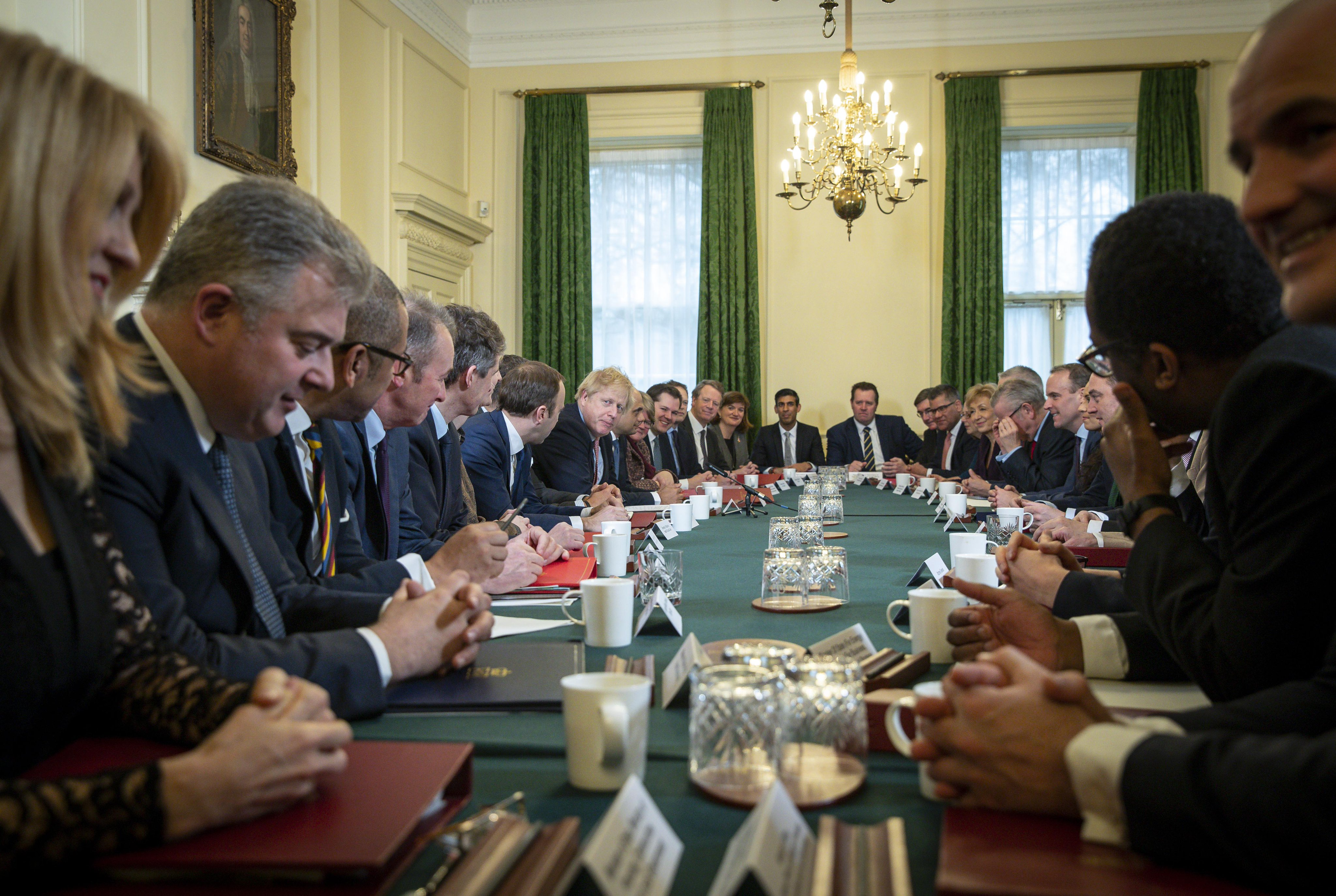
Prime Minister Boris Johnson chairs meetings of the Cabinet.

This is a list of resignations from the second government formed by Prime Minister Boris Johnson. Between forming a government on 13 December 2019 after the 2019 general election and his eventual resignation amid a government crisis, Johnson faced the resignation of 10 cabinet ministers (one of whom resigned on two separate occasions) and 3 ministers 'attending cabinet'. This list omits ministers who were invited to leave the government during the 2020, 2021, or 2022 cabinet reshuffles. It also excludes all ministers who resigned during the previous government formed by Johnson.

== 2020 ==
Minister (Cabinet members shown in bold)	Office	Date of resignation	Reason
Rt Hon **Sajid Javid** MP	Chancellor of the Exchequer	13 February	Refused to dismiss his advisers during the 2020 cabinet reshuffle.
Rt Hon Jake Berry MP	Minister of State for the Northern Powerhouse and Local Growth	13 February	Refused to accept a new position during the 2020 cabinet reshuffle.
Rt Hon Conor Burns MP	Minister of State for Trade Policy	4 May	Standards Committee found that he had used his position to intimidate a member of the public.
Douglas Ross MP	Parliamentary Under Secretary of State for Scotland	26 May	Discontented with Dominic Cummings' explanation for breaching the government's restrictions on travel during the COVID-19 pandemic in the United Kingdom.
Rt Hon **Anne-Marie Trevelyan** MP	Secretary of State for International Development	2 September	Department abolished.
Simon Clarke MP	Minister of State for Regional Growth and Local Government	8 September	Personal reasons.
The Lord Keen of Elie QC PC	Advocate General for Scotland	16 September	Concerns arising from the Internal Market Bill.
Chris Green MP	Parliamentary Private Secretary to the Department for Education	13 October	Opposed the government's response to the COVID-19 pandemic.
Caroline Ansell MP	Parliamentary Private Secretary to the Department for Environment, Food and Rural Affairs	22 October	Defied government whip on free school meals.
Rt Hon The Baroness Sugg CBE	Parliamentary Under Secretary of State for the Overseas Territories and Sustainable Development	25 November	Opposed the announcement of cuts to the overseas aid budget.

== 2021 ==
Minister (Cabinet members shown in bold)	Office	Date of resignation	Reason
Kelly Tolhurst MP	Parliamentary Under-Secretary of State for Housing and Rough Sleeping	16 January	Personal reasons.
Johnny Mercer MP	Parliamentary Under-Secretary of State for Defence People and Veterans	20 April	Expressed frustration that the Overseas Operations Bill did not include legal protections for British soldiers that served in Northern Ireland during the Troubles. It has been reported that Mercer was sacked by Johnson.
Rt Hon **Matt Hancock** MP	Secretary of State for Health and Social Care	26 June	Breaching social distancing guidelines after he was revealed to be having an affair with his aide and departmental Non-Executive Director Gina Coladangelo.
Rt Hon James Brokenshire MP	Minister of State for Security	7 July	Health reasons; surgery on a lung tumor.
Rt Hon **The Lord Frost** CMG PC	Minister of State for the Cabinet Office	18 December	Opposition to "COVID Plan B" and the political direction of the government.

== 2022 ==
Minister (Cabinet members shown in bold)	Office	Date of resignation	Reason
Rt Hon The Lord Agnew of Oulton DL	Minister of State for Efficiency and Transformation	24 January	Unable to defend the government's track record on tackling fraud in Covid business schemes.
Angela Richardson MP	Parliamentary Private Secretary to the Department for Levelling Up, Housing and Communities	31 January	Criticised Boris Johnson for his mishandling of the partygate affair.
Rt Hon The Lord Wolfson of Tredegar QC	Parliamentary Under-Secretary of State for Justice	13 April	Accused Boris Johnson of undermining the rule of law, following his decision not to resign in response to criminal sanctions imposed on him by the Metropolitan Police.
Paul Holmes MP	Parliamentary Private Secretary to the Home Office	27 May	Concerns around "toxic culture" at the heart of government following the publication of the Sue Gray report.
John Lamont MP	Parliamentary Private Secretary to the Foreign, Commonwealth and Development Office	6 June	Resigned in order to vote against Boris Johnson in a vote of confidence as leader of the Conservative Party.
Rt Hon **Oliver Dowden** CBE MP	Chairman of the Conservative Party; Minister without Portfolio	24 June	Resigned over poor results at the Tiverton and Honiton and Wakefield by-elections.
Rt Hon Chris Pincher MP	Government Deputy Chief Whip; Treasurer of the Household	30 June	Reports that he drunkenly groped two men at the Carlton Club on 29 June.
Rt Hon **Sajid Javid** MP	Secretary of State for Health and Social Care	5 July	Main article: July 2022 United Kingdom government crisis An historic mass resignation (the largest number of ministerial resignations in a 24-hour period, more than tripling the previous record of 11 resignations, set in 1932 during the 2nd National Government), following a statement by the Prime Minister, in which he confirmed that he had been aware of sexual misconduct allegations against Chris Pincher before appointing him to the government. (Note: Michael Gove was sacked from his Cabinet Position of Secretary of State for Levelling Up, Housing and Communities by Prime Minister Boris Johnson, after he urged the PM to resign in response to the crisis.) This contributed to the resignation of Johnson as leader of the Conservative Party and later Prime Minister, with him replaced by Liz Truss as party leader on 5 September and as prime minister the following day.
Rt Hon **Rishi Sunak** MP	Chancellor of the Exchequer	5 July	
Saqib Bhatti MBE MP	Parliamentary Private Secretary to the Department for Health and Social Care	5 July	
Jonathan Gullis MP	Parliamentary Private Secretary to the Northern Ireland Office	5 July	
Nicola Richards MP	Parliamentary Private Secretary to the Department for Transport	5 July	
Virginia Crosbie MP	Parliamentary Private Secretary to the Office of the Secretary of State for Wales	5 July	
Alex Chalk QC MP	Solicitor General for England and Wales	5 July	
Will Quince MP	Parliamentary Under-Secretary of State for Children and Families	6 July	
Laura Trott MP	Parliamentary Private Secretary to the Department for Transport	6 July	
Robin Walker MP	Minister of State for School Standards	6 July	
John Glen MP	Economic Secretary to the Treasury	6 July	
Felicity Buchan MP	Parliamentary Private Secretary to the Department for Business, Energy and Industrial Strategy	6 July	
Victoria Atkins MP	Minister of State for Prisons and Probation	6 July	
Jo Churchill MP	Parliamentary Under-Secretary of State for Agri-Innovation and Climate Adaption	6 July	
Stuart Andrew MP	Minister of State for Housing	6 July	
Selaine Saxby MP	Parliamentary Private Secretary to HM Treasury	6 July	
David Johnston MP	Parliamentary Private Secretary to the Department for Education	6 July	
Claire Coutinho MP	Parliamentary Private Secretary to HM Treasury	6 July	
Lee Rowley MP	Parliamentary Under-Secretary of State for Business and Industry	6 July	
Kemi Badenoch MP	Minister of State for Local Government, Faith and Communities; Minister of State for Equalities	6 July	
Neil O'Brien MP	Parliamentary Under-Secretary of State for Levelling Up, The Union and Constitution	6 July	
Alex Burghart MP	Parliamentary Under-Secretary of State for Apprenticeships and Skills	6 July	
Julia Lopez MP	Minister of State for Media, Data, and Digital Infrastructure	6 July	
Mims Davies MP	Parliamentary Under-Secretary of State for Employment	6 July	
Duncan Baker MP	Parliamentary Private Secretary to the Department for Levelling Up, Housing and Communities	6 July	
Craig Williams MP	Parliamentary Private Secretary to HM Treasury	6 July	
Mark Logan MP	Parliamentary Private Secretary to the Northern Ireland Office	6 July	
Rachel Maclean MP	Parliamentary Under-Secretary of State for Safeguarding	6 July	
Mike Freer MP	Parliamentary Under-Secretary of State for Exports	6 July	
Mark Fletcher MP	Parliamentary Private Secretary to the Department for Business, Energy and Industrial Strategy	6 July	
Sara Britcliffe MP	Parliamentary Private Secretary to the Department for Education	6 July	
Ruth Edwards MP	Parliamentary Private Secretary to the Office of the Secretary of State for Scotland	6 July	
Peter Gibson MP	Parliamentary Private Secretary to the Department for International Trade	6 July	
James Sunderland MP	Parliamentary Private Secretary to the Department for Environment, Food and Rural Affairs	6 July	
Jacob Young MP	Parliamentary Private Secretary to the Department for Levelling Up, Housing and Communities	6 July	
Rt Hon **Michael Gove** MP	Secretary of State for Levelling Up, Housing and Communities	6 July	
James Daly MP	Parliamentary Private Secretary to the Department for Work and Pensions	6 July	
Danny Kruger MBE MP	Parliamentary Private Secretary to the Department for Levelling Up, Housing and Communities	6 July	
Rt Hon **Simon Hart** MP	Secretary of State for Wales	6 July	
Edward Argar MP	Minister of State for Health	6 July	
Gareth Davies MP	Parliamentary Private Secretary to the Department of Health and Social Care	6 July	
James Davies MP	Parliamentary Private Secretary to the Department of Health and Social Care	6 July	
Rt Hon **Brandon Lewis** CBE MP	Secretary of State for Northern Ireland	7 July	
Helen Whately MP	Exchequer Secretary to the Treasury	7 July	
Rt Hon Damian Hinds MP	Minister of State for Security and Borders	7 July	
George Freeman MP (Note: George Freeman's letter outlines not having confidence in the Prime Minister, but does not explicitly say that he has resigned.)	Parliamentary Under-Secretary of State for Science, Research and Innovation	7 July	
Guy Opperman MP	Parliamentary Under-Secretary of State for Pensions and Financial Inclusion	7 July	
Chris Philp MP	Parliamentary Under-Secretary of State for Tech and the Digital Economy	7 July	
James Cartlidge MP	Parliamentary Under-Secretary of State for Justice	7 July	
Rt Hon **Michelle Donelan** MP	Secretary of State for Education	7 July	
Rob Butler MP	Parliamentary Private Secretary to the Foreign, Commonwealth and Development Office	7 July	
Rebecca Pow MP (Note: Pow's resignation letter was officially submitted after Johnson had announced his resignation. Pow later tweeted that, while she had informed the Prime Minister of her intention to resign prior to his announcement, she had been unable to submit her letter in person due to her self-isolating with coronavirus.)	Parliamentary Under-Secretary of State for Nature Recovery and the Domestic Environment	7 July	
Jack Brereton MP	Parliamentary Private Secretary to the Secretary of State for International Trade	7 July	
Fay Jones MP	Parliamentary Private Secretary to the Leader of the House of Commons	7 July	
Rt Hon The Lord Grimstone	Minister of State for Investment	7 July	Quit because Johnson had decided to leave Number 10 rather than fighting to remain in his post
Rt Hon The Lord Greenhalgh	Minister of State for Building Safety and Fire	8 July	Stated "now that the die has been cast I have decided that this is the right time for me to resign"
Rt Hon The Lord Harrington	Minister of State for Refugees	4 September	Resigned from government prior to the announcement of the result of the July–September 2022 Conservative Party leadership election
Rt Hon **Nigel Adams** MP	Minister of State without Portfolio	5 September	Announced that they did not intend to serve in the incoming government

== See also ==
- List of departures from the second May ministry
