= Graham Webster (archaeologist) =

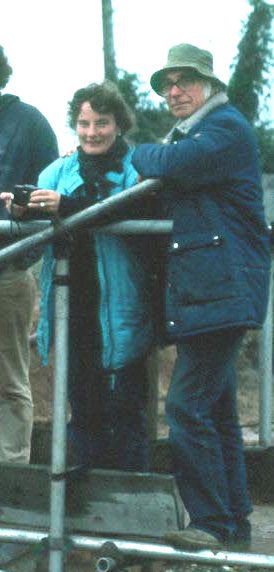
- Graham and Diana Webster in 1984
- Born: 31 May 1913; Stamford, Lincolnshire, England
- Died: 21 May 2001 (aged 87); Sevenhampton, Wiltshire
- Citizenship: United Kingdom
- Education: Manchester University, Birmingham University
- Known for: Study of Roman Britain
- Scientific career
- Fields: History; Archaeology
- Workplaces: Grosvenor Museum, Birmingham University

Graham Alexander Webster OBE (31 May 1913 – 21 May 2001) was a British archaeologist, one of the pre-eminent figures of Roman-British archaeology in the late 20th century.

== Life ==
Webster was born at Stamford, Lincolnshire. He developed an interest in Roman Britain while still at school, but opted for a career as a civil engineer. During World War II he served with the Air Ministry, building airfields, and during this period became engaged in archaeological excavations, most notably in the cities of Canterbury and Lincoln. He joined Lincoln's City Engineer's department in 1945, and directed excavations on the Westgate School site which were to reveal the earliest evidence for the Roman Legionary defences of Lincoln. He was also to excavate the Roman pottery kilns at Swanpool and South Carlton. His growing reputation in the field led to his full-time appointment in 1948 as curator of the Grosvenor Museum, Chester. While employed there he wrote The Roman Army (1956), which would evolve eventually into his best-known book, The Roman Imperial Army, published in 1969 and in numerous later editions.

Webster also studied for an MA at Manchester University and helped organise an archaeological training school at Great Casterton in Rutland. In 1954 he was appointed archaeology tutor in the Extra-Mural Department of Birmingham University. He obtained his PhD from the same institution, with a thesis on Roman strategy in Britain under the governor Ostorius Scapula. He conducted a number of excavations, notably at Waddon Hill, Dorset and at Barnsley Park, Gloucestershire (1961–1979), the latter developing into an archaeological training school and where he met his second wife, Diana (married 1968). Webster's most celebrated excavation, however, was at the abandoned Roman city of Wroxeter near Shrewsbury (1955–1985), where he also initiated a training school.

In his later years, Webster was a prolific writer, with a succession of books on various aspects of Roman Britain. He served as archaeological advisor to Batsford Books, where he oversaw the publication of a long list of archaeological works. He received the Order of the British Empire in 1982.

Webster is considered one of the pioneers of Romano-British excavation. Throughout his long career he gained a reputation as an archaeological mentor, always willing, despite his commitments, to give advice and practical assistance to both the expert and neophyte. At the time of his death in 2001, a generation of now established archaeologists remembered him as someone generous with both his time and his friendship.
