= Lincoln Central Mosque and Cultural Centre =

Mosque in Lincoln, Lincolnshire, England

Lincoln Central Mosque & Cultural Centre
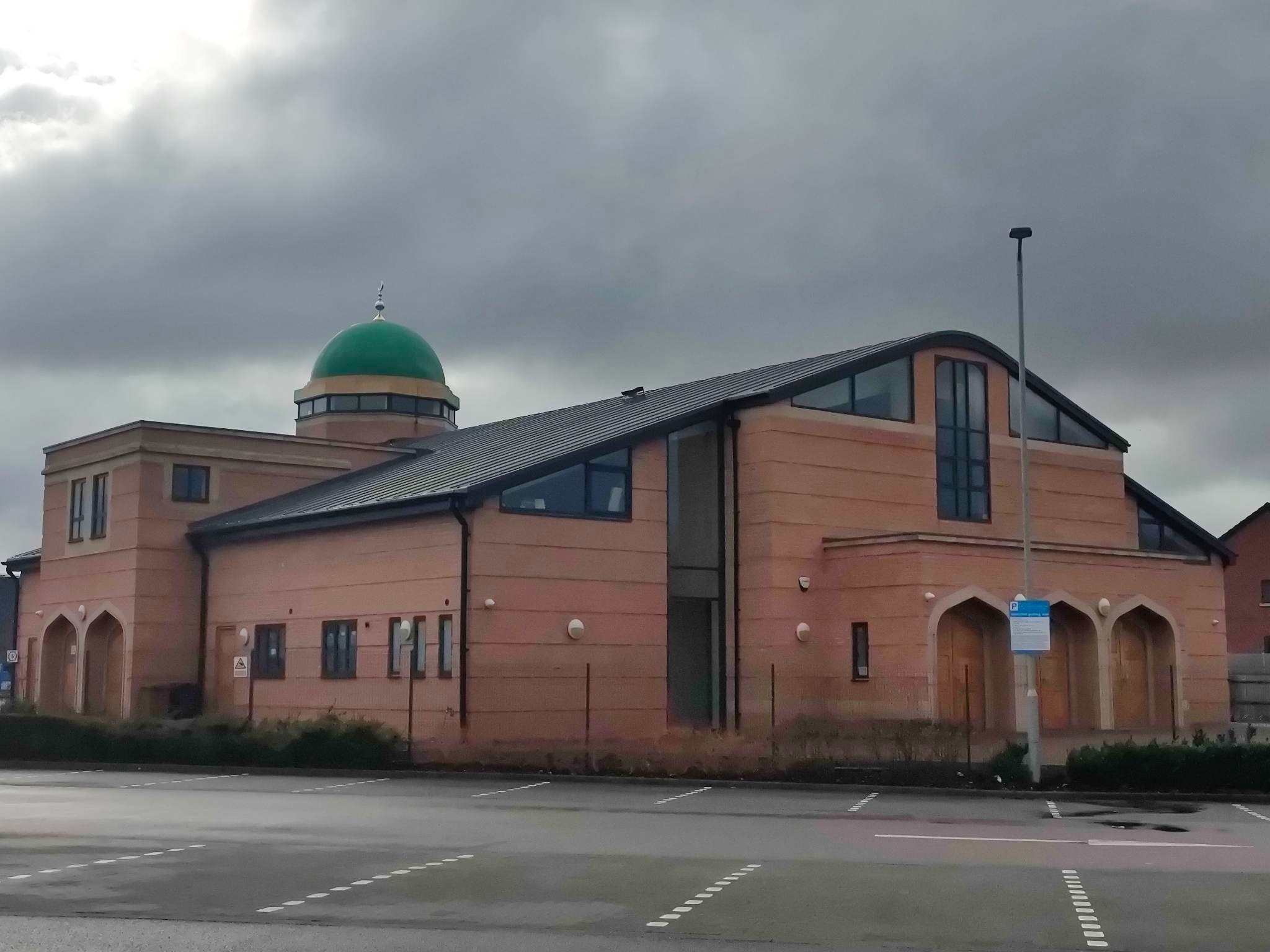

- The Mosque in Lincoln

Religion
- Affiliation: Islam
- Ecclesiastical or organisational status: Active
- Leadership: Atikur Rehman Patel - Imam
- Year consecrated: 2010
- Status: Active

Location
- Location: England
- Coordinates: 53.218792°N 0.551777°W

Architecture
- Architect: Active8
- Type: Islamic
- Style: Islamic
- General contractor: Active8
- Completed: 2018
- Construction cost: £2 million

Specifications
- Dome: 1
- Minaret: 1

Website
- www.lincolncentralmosque.org.uk

Lincoln Central Mosque and Islamic Centre, also known as Lincoln Central Mosque, is a mosque in the city of Lincoln in the ceremonial county of Lincolnshire, England. It is located on Dixon Street to the southwest of the city centre. The local congregation attend from the city and some surrounding areas near Lincoln. It is one of two mosques in the city (the other being Faizan e Madina Lincoln) and is home to the second largest Muslim community in the county.

== History ==
Lincoln's Muslim community originally met in a former Baptist church on Orchard Street in the city centre but this proved to be too small for the growing congregation as it could only accommodate 60 worshippers at a time. The Grandstand Community Centre was also used for Friday prayers.

A replacement mosque was originally planned for land purchased by a trust on Church Drive in Boultham Park. This proposal was rejected by Lincoln City Council following concerns expressed by nearby residents over parking issues. Local councillors sympathised with the Muslim community over the rejection and hoped they could find a site elsewhere in Lincoln. The mosque sought further donations, raising £1.6 million, and acquired a site off Boultham Park Road in November 2012 and successfully sought planning permission from the council. The mosque opened officially in 2018 after multiple setbacks and the original contractor going into administration.

== Present day ==
The mosque is the largest purpose-built mosque in Lincolnshire and is an important centre for the local Muslim community and non-Muslim community. It operates a food bank and offers lessons in Islam.
