= Peter Luff =

British politician (born 1955)

Sir Peter Luff
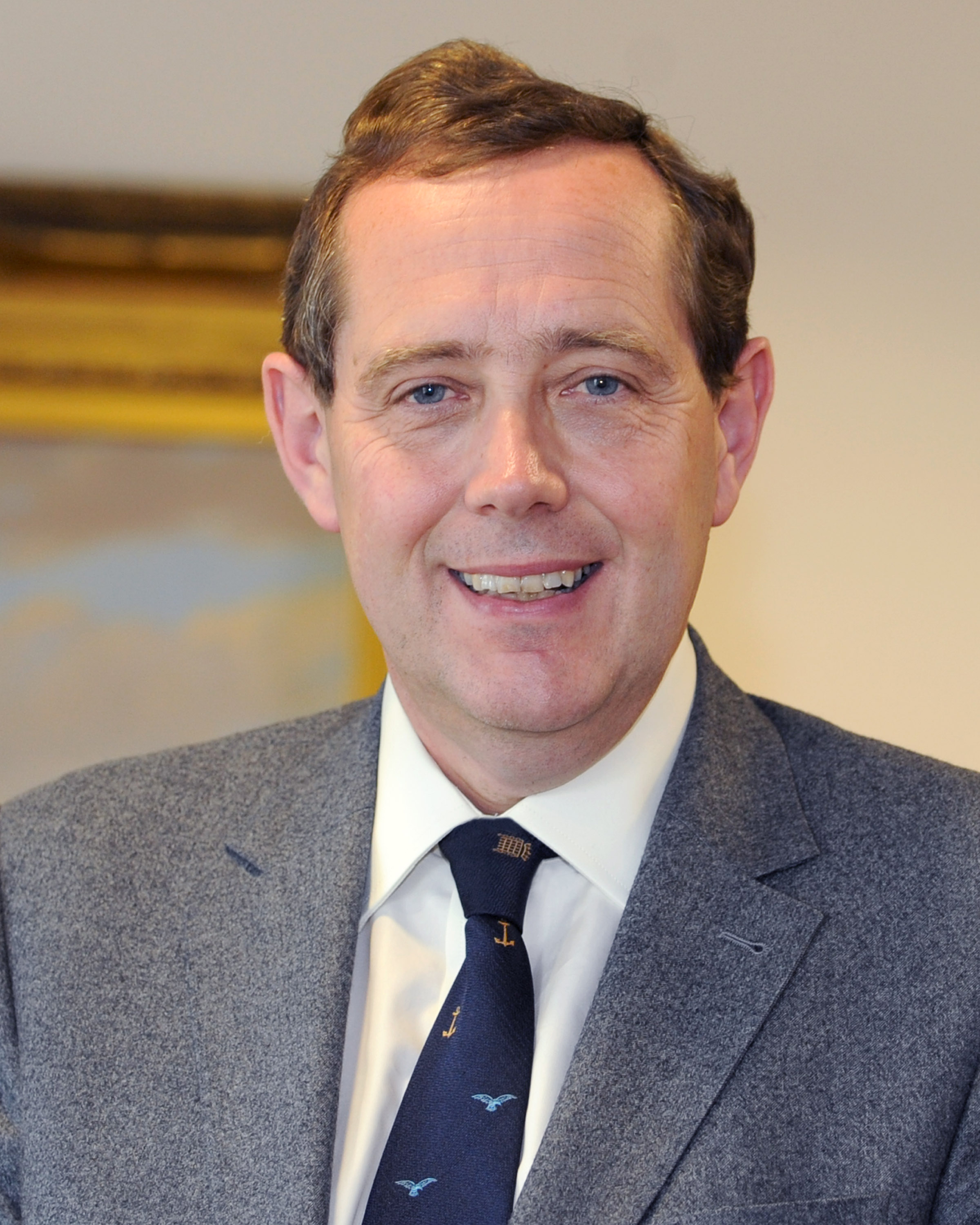
- Luff in 2010

Parliamentary Under-Secretary of State for Defence Equipment, Support and Technology
- In office 25 May 2010 – 4 September 2012
- Prime Minister: David Cameron
- Preceded by: Quentin Davies
- Succeeded by: Philip Dunne

Chair of the Business, Innovation and Skills Select Committee Business and Enterprise (2007–2009) Trade and Industry (2005–2007)
- In office 14 July 2005 – 6 May 2010
- Preceded by: Martin O'Neill
- Succeeded by: Adrian Bailey

Member of Parliament for Mid Worcestershire
- In office 1 May 1997 – 30 March 2015
- Preceded by: Eric Forth
- Succeeded by: Nigel Huddleston

Member of Parliament for Worcester
- In office 9 April 1992 – 8 April 1997
- Preceded by: Peter Walker
- Succeeded by: Mike Foster

Personal details
- Born: 18 February 1955 (age 71) Windsor, Berkshire, England
- Party: Conservative
- Spouse: Julia Jenks (m. 1982)
- Children: 2
- Education: Corpus Christi College, Cambridge

Sir Peter James Luff (born 18 February 1955) is a British former politician and previous Chair of the National Heritage Memorial Fund and the National Lottery Heritage Fund. Formerly a British Conservative Party politician, he was the Member of Parliament (MP) for Mid Worcestershire from 1997 to 2015 and for Worcester from 1992 until 1997. He was a junior Defence minister from 2010 to 2012.

== Early life ==
Peter Luff was born in the town of Windsor in Berkshire and attended the local Windsor Grammar School. He studied at Corpus Christi College, Cambridge, receiving a Bachelor of Arts (BA) degree in Economics in 1976.

Before entering parliament, he worked for three years from 1977 as a research assistant to the Conservative MP Peter Walker, before managing Edward Heath's private office for two years from 1980. He became the managing director of Good Relations Ltd, a public affairs company, in 1982.

In 1987, he became a special adviser to the Secretary of State for Trade and Industry, David Young. He became a senior consultant for Lowe Bell Communications (later Bell Pottinger Communications) in 1989, before again working for Good Relations from 1990.

== Parliamentary career ==
He contested Holborn and St Pancras at the 1987 general election, but was comfortably beaten by the sitting Labour MP, Frank Dobson. He was first elected to Parliament for Worcester, when he succeeded his former boss, Peter Walker.

Following changes in the parliamentary constituency boundaries, he was selected for the new Mid Worcestershire constituency, comprising large areas of three former constituencies, defeating another sitting Conservative MP, Eric Forth, for the nomination. He won the safe seat comfortably and was a member of the House of Commons from 1992. In the 1997 Labour landslide, he held his seat, and retained it until standing down in 2015.

He was appointed a Parliamentary Private Secretary (PPS) in 1993 to the energy minister Tim Eggar, and from 1996 he served as PPS to both Ann Widdecombe the prisons minister at the Home Office and Lord Mackay, Lord Chancellor, holding these two positions until the defeat of the Conservative government at the general election of 1997.

As a backbench MP, he served on many parliamentary select committees, including chairing the Agriculture Select Committee from 1997 to 2000, and from 2005 to 2010 he chaired what was successively known as the Trade and Industry Committee; the Business and Enterprise Select Committee; and the Business, Innovation and Skills Select Committee.

He was the founder member of the Parliamentary Hunting with Hounds Middle Way Group, and took a keen parliamentary interest in India. In the Conservative-Liberal Democrat Coalition of May 2010, Luff was appointed as a junior Defence minister at the Ministry of Defence, with the post of Minister for Defence Equipment, Support and Technology.

Prior to the general election of 2015, Luff stood down as a candidate. He was knighted in the 2014 New Year Honours for political and public service. He joined the National Heritage Memorial Fund and the National Lottery Heritage Fund as Chair of the Board of Trustees on 30 March 2015.

== Personal life ==
He married Julia Jenks in 1982. They have a son and a daughter.

Parliament of the United Kingdom
Preceded by Peter Walker	Member of Parliament for Worcester; 1992–1997	Succeeded by Michael Foster
New constituency	Member of Parliament for Mid Worcestershire; 1997–2015	Succeeded by Nigel Huddleston
