= St Helen's Church, Lincoln =

Church in Lincoln, Lincolnshire, England

- Church of St Helen, Lincoln
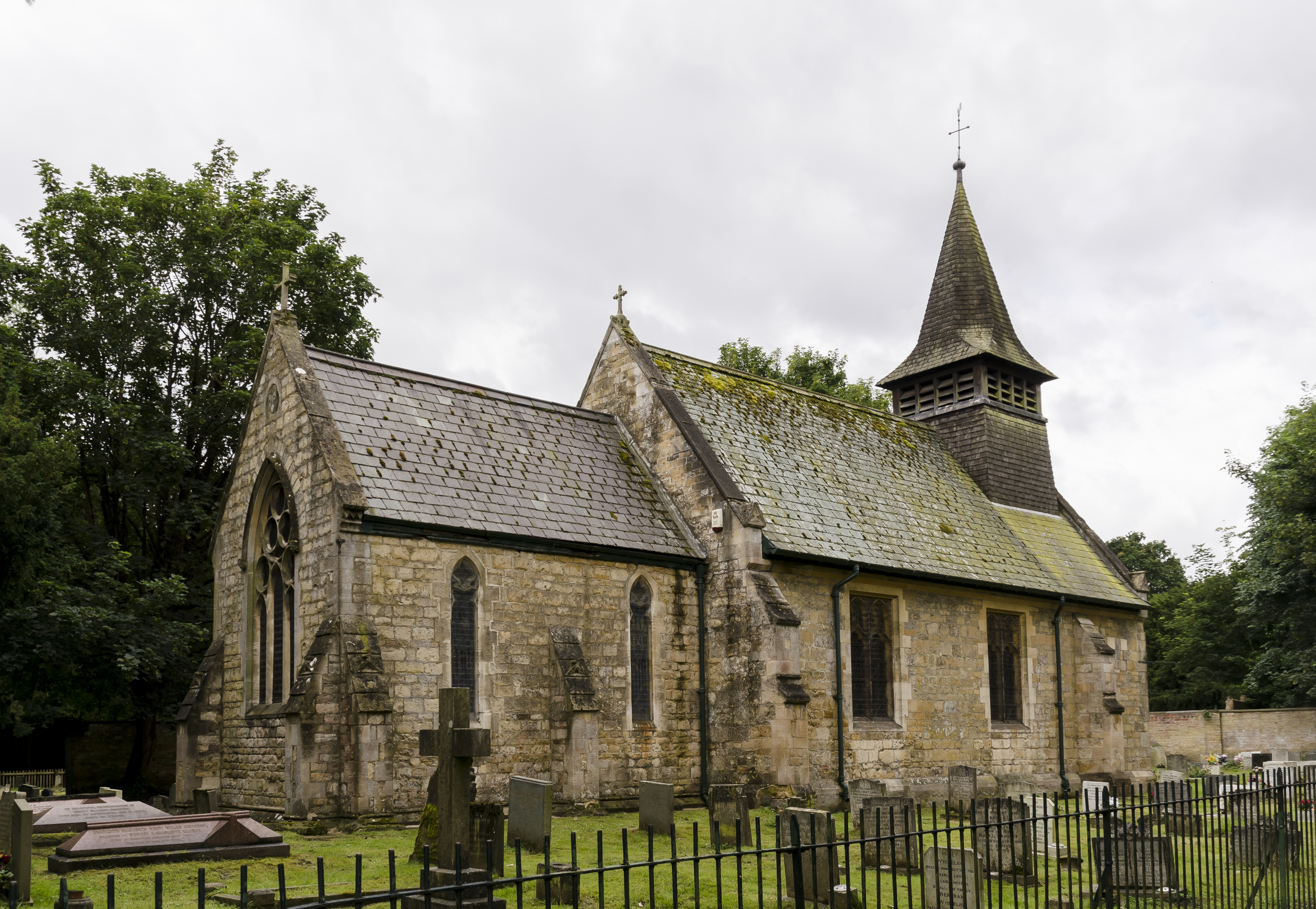
- St Helen's Church, Boultham, Lincoln
- St Helen's Church, Lincoln
- 53.210286°N 0.556975°W
- OS grid reference: SK 96460 69090
- Location: Boultham Park, Lincoln, Lincolnshire
- Country: England
- Denomination: Church of England
- Website: sites.google.com/view/boultham-parish-website

History
- Status: Active
- Dedication: Saint Helen
- Dedicated: 13th Century
- Consecrated: 1201/1300?

Architecture
- Architectural type: Medieval

Administration
- Province: Canterbury
- Diocese: Lincoln
- Archdeaconry: Lincoln
- Deanery: Lincoln

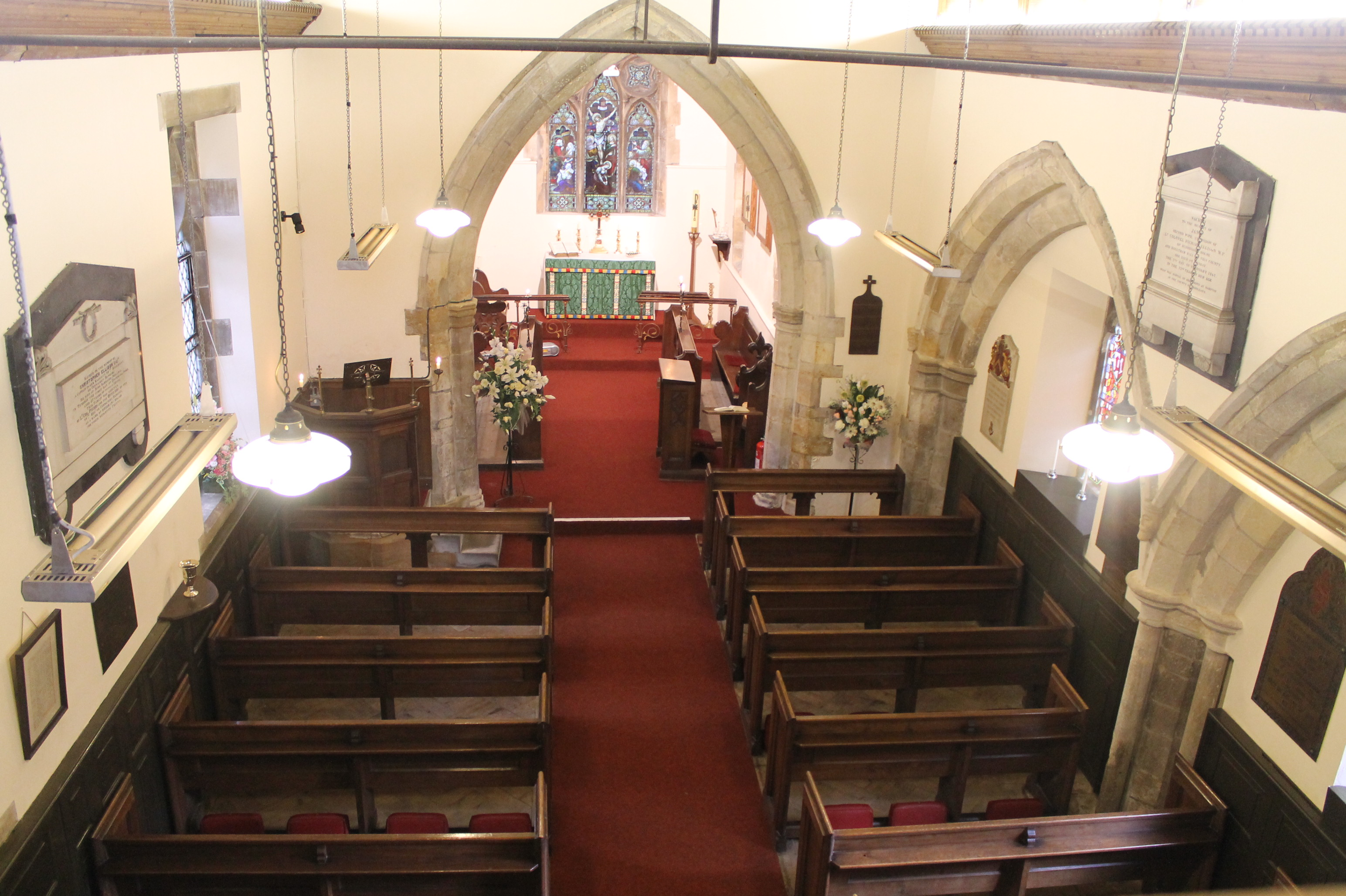
Interior of the church

St Helen's Church, Lincoln is a grade II* listed church in Boultham Park in the Boultham suburb of Lincoln in Lincolnshire, England. It is one of the oldest churches in Lincoln as it was built in the 13th century. After a period of being abandoned, it was restored to use by C. Hodgson Fowler for use as a place of worship and it has since been active. It was grade II* listed in October 1953. The church is combined with the nearby Holy Cross Church (a brick-built church seating 200, whose foundation stone was laid in 1939) to form the "Congregation of Holy Cross and St Helen's", whose regular services are held in Holy Cross. St Helen's, which seats 60, is used for small weddings and other special events.

Part of the church's listing entry describes it as having:

"FITTINGS include a good square baluster shaped font, C18, inscribed "Boultham Church", and a desk with reused C18 fleur-de-lys ends. C19 fittings include octagonal oak skeleton pulpit, traceried stalls, wrought-iron altar rail and plain octagonal font. MEMORIALS include 2 tablets, mid C19, and 3 brasses c1900, all to the Ellison family of Boultham Hall. Brass war memorial tablet, 1919." - "Buildings of England : Lincolnshire: Pevsner N: Lincolnshire: London: 1989-: 526".

The Friends of the Church of St Helen's, Boultham is a registered charity established in 2003, formed to "maintain the structure of St Helens Church Boultham Lincoln, and the church yard".

In the churchyard stands a memorial to soldiers killed in the Crimean War. The granite memorial is dated circa 1851 and is thought to be a coping stone. Part of the inscription reads "Brought from Sevastopol . . . ".
