= Droitwich and Evesham =

UK Parliament constituency (1983/2024 onwards)

Coordinates: 52.16°N 2.05°W

- County constituency for the House of Commons
- Interactive map of boundaries from 2024
- Boundary of Droitwich and Evesham in the West Midlands region
- County: Worcestershire
- Electorate: 76,624
- Major settlements: Droitwich Spa and Evesham

Current constituency
- Created: 2024
- Member of Parliament: Nigel Huddleston (Conservative)
- Seats: One
- Created from: Mid Worcestershire

Droitwich and Evesham is a constituency in Worcestershire represented in the House of Commons of the UK Parliament. Further to the completion of the 2023 review of Westminster constituencies, it was first contested in the 2024 general election. The constituency name refers to the towns of Droitwich Spa and Evesham. From 1983 to 2024, the constituency was known as Mid Worcestershire, with similar boundaries.

Its Member of Parliament (MP) has been Nigel Huddleston of the Conservative Party since 2015.

== Constituency profile ==
Droitwich and Evesham is a rural constituency located in the Wychavon district of Worcestershire which covers the towns and villages to the east of the city of Worcester. It is named after the towns of Droitwich Spa and Evesham, which have populations of around 25,000 and 28,000, respectively. Villages in the constituency include Hartlebury, Fernhill Heath and Broadway. Droitwich Spa is a spa town which grew rapidly during the late 20th century to accommodate overspill from Birmingham. Evesham is an historic market town which lies on the edge of the Cotswolds. The constituency is generally affluent with low levels of deprivation, rented housing and social housing. House prices are similar to the national average and higher than the rest of the West Midlands region.

Compared to the rest of the country, residents of the constituency are generally older and more religious. Levels of income, education and income are similar to national averages and higher than the rest of the region. White people made up 97% of the population at the 2021 census. At the local council level (county and district), most of the constituency is represented by Conservative councillors, but some rural areas between Droitwich Spa and Evesham have elected Liberal Democrats and Evesham is represented by Reform UK at the county council. An estimated 59% of voters in the constituency supported leaving the European Union in the 2016 referendum, higher than the nationwide figure of 52%.

== Boundaries ==
=== Historic (Mid Worcestershire) ===
1983–1997: The Borough of Redditch, and the District of Wychavon wards of Bowbrook, Claines Central and West, Claines East, Dodderhill, Droitwich Central, Droitwich South, Droitwich West, Hanbury, Hartlebury, Lovett, and Ombersley.

The original constituency, which was created in 1983, covered a much different area. Situated to the north of Worcester, it included the towns of Droitwich and Redditch.

1997–2010: The District of Wychavon wards of Badsey, Bowbrook, Bretforton and Offenham, Broadway, Dodderhill, Drakes Broughton, Droitwich Central, Droitwich South, Droitwich West, Evesham East, Evesham Hampton, Evesham North, Evesham South, Evesham West, Fladbury, Hanbury, Hartlebury, Harvington and Norton, Honeybourne and Pebworth, Lenches, Lovett, North Claines, Ombersley, Pinvin, Spetchley, The Littletons, Upton Snodsbury, and Wickhamford.

Under the fourth periodic review of Westminster constituencies, the boundaries of Mid Worcestershire were completely redrawn. The majority of the electorate were now included in the newly created constituency of Redditch (comprising the Borough thereof). The remaining parts, including Droitwich, were now combined with a large part of the South Worcestershire constituency (consequently renamed West Worcestershire), including the town of Evesham. To combine the two areas, rural parts of the Worcester constituency were also added.

2010–2024: The District of Wychavon wards of Badsey, Bengeworth, Bowbrook, Bretforton and Offenham, Broadway and Wickhamford, Dodderhill, Drakes Broughton, Droitwich Central, Droitwich East, Droitwich South East, Droitwich South West, Droitwich West, Evesham North, Evesham South, Fladbury, Great Hampton, Hartlebury, Harvington and Norton, Honeybourne and Pebworth, Little Hampton, Lovett and North Claines, Norton and Whittington, Ombersley, Pinvin, The Littletons, and Upton Snodsbury.

Minor changes to align with revised ward boundaries.

=== Current (Droitwich and Evesham) ===
Although MId Worcestershire had contained the towns of Droitwich and Evesham since 1997, it was not until the 2023 review of Westminster constituencies which came into effect for the 2024 general election, that the Boundary Commission decided to rename the constituency to reflect this. The newly named constituency contained the same wards (as they existed on 1 December 2020), except for Dodderhill, and Harvington and Norton, which were transferred to Redditch.

Following a local government boundary review which came into effect in May 2023, the constituency of Droitwich and Evesham now contains the following wards of the District of Wychavon from the 2024 general election:

- Badsey & Aldington, Bengeworth, Bowbrook, Bretforton & Offenham, Broadway, Sedgeberrow & Childswickham (part), Dodderhill (part), Drakes Broughton, Norton & Whittington, Droitwich East, Droitwich South East, Droitwich South West, Droitwich West, Evesham North, Evesham South, Fladbury, Inkberrow (part), Hampton, Hartlebury, Honeybourne, Pebworth & The Littletons, North Claines & Salwarpe, Ombersley, Pinvin, and Upton Snodsbury.

== Members of Parliament ==
Mid Worcestershire prior to 2024

| Election | Member | Party |
|---|---|---|
| 1983 | Eric Forth | Conservative |
| 1997 | Peter Luff | Conservative |
| 2015 | Nigel Huddleston | Conservative |

== Elections ==
=== Elections in the 1980s ===
General election 1983: Mid Worcestershire
| Party | Candidate | Votes | % | ±% |
|---|---|---|---|---|
| Conservative | Eric Forth | 28,159 | 50.9 | |
| Labour | Richard Maher | 14,954 | 25.2 | |
| SDP | Margaret Fairhead | 12,866 | 23.2 | |
| Nobody Party | DW Fletcher | 386 | 0.7 | |
| Majority | | 14,205 | 25.7 | |
| Turnout | | 56,365 | 74.6 | |
| Conservative win (new seat) | | | | |

General election 1987: Mid Worcestershire
| Party | Candidate | Votes | % | ±% |
|---|---|---|---|---|
| Conservative | Eric Forth | 31,854 | 51.6 | +0.7 |
| Labour | Peter Pinfield | 16,943 | 27.4 | +2.2 |
| SDP | Edgar Harwood | 12,954 | 21.0 | −2.2 |
| Majority | | 14,911 | 24.2 | −1.5 |
| Turnout | | 61,751 | 76.6 | +2.0 |
| Conservative hold | | Swing | | |

=== Elections in the 1990s ===
General election 1992: Mid Worcestershire
| Party | Candidate | Votes | % | ±% |
|---|---|---|---|---|
| Conservative | Eric Forth | 33,964 | 49.7 | −1.9 |
| Labour | Jacqui Smith | 24,094 | 35.3 | +7.9 |
| Liberal Democrats | David J. Barwick | 9,745 | 14.3 | −6.7 |
| Natural Law | Paul Davis | 520 | 0.8 | New |
| Majority | | 9,870 | 14.4 | −9.8 |
| Turnout | | 68,323 | 81.1 | +4.5 |
| Conservative hold | | Swing | +4.9 | |

General election 1997: Mid Worcestershire
| Party | Candidate | Votes | % | ±% |
|---|---|---|---|---|
| Conservative | Peter Luff | 24,092 | 47.4 | |
| Labour | Diane Smith | 14,680 | 28.9 | |
| Liberal Democrats | David Barwick | 9,458 | 18.6 | |
| Referendum | Terence Watson | 1,780 | 3.5 | New |
| UKIP | David Ingles | 646 | 1.3 | New |
| Natural Law | Alan Dyer | 163 | 0.3 | |
| Majority | | 9,412 | 18.5 | |
| Turnout | | 50,819 | 74.3 | |
| Conservative hold | | Swing | | |

=== Elections in the 2000s ===
General election 2001: Mid Worcestershire
| Party | Candidate | Votes | % | ±% |
|---|---|---|---|---|
| Conservative | Peter Luff | 22,937 | 51.1 | +3.7 |
| Labour | David Bannister | 12,310 | 27.4 | −1.5 |
| Liberal Democrats | Robert Browne | 8,420 | 18.8 | +0.2 |
| UKIP | Anthony Eaves | 1,230 | 2.7 | +1.4 |
| Majority | | 10,627 | 23.7 | +5.2 |
| Turnout | | 44,897 | 62.4 | −11.9 |
| Conservative hold | | Swing | | |

General election 2005: Mid Worcestershire
| Party | Candidate | Votes | % | ±% |
|---|---|---|---|---|
| Conservative | Peter Luff | 24,783 | 51.5 | +0.4 |
| Labour | Matthew Gregson | 11,456 | 23.8 | −3.6 |
| Liberal Democrats | Margaret Rowley | 9,796 | 20.4 | +1.6 |
| UKIP | Anthony Eaves | 2,092 | 4.3 | +1.6 |
| Majority | | 13,327 | 27.7 | +4.0 |
| Turnout | | 48,127 | 67.3 | +4.9 |
| Conservative hold | | Swing | +2.0 | |

=== Elections in the 2010s ===
General election 2010: Mid Worcestershire
| Party | Candidate | Votes | % | ±% |
|---|---|---|---|---|
| Conservative | Peter Luff | 27,770 | 54.5 | +3.2 |
| Liberal Democrats | Margaret Rowley | 11,906 | 23.4 | +3.1 |
| Labour | Robin Lunn | 7,613 | 14.9 | −9.1 |
| UKIP | John White | 3,049 | 6.0 | +1.6 |
| Green | Gordon Matthews | 593 | 1.2 | New |
| Majority | | 15,864 | 31.1 | +3.4 |
| Turnout | | 50,931 | 70.6 | +4.0 |
| Conservative hold | | Swing | 0.0 | |

General election 2015: Mid Worcestershire
| Party | Candidate | Votes | % | ±% |
|---|---|---|---|---|
| Conservative | Nigel Huddleston | 29,763 | 57.0 | +2.5 |
| UKIP | Richard Keel | 9,213 | 17.7 | +11.7 |
| Labour | Robin Lunn | 7,548 | 14.5 | −0.4 |
| Liberal Democrats | Margaret Rowley | 3,750 | 7.2 | −16.2 |
| Green | Neil Franks | 1,933 | 3.7 | +2.5 |
| Majority | | 20,532 | 39.3 | +8.2 |
| Turnout | | 52,225 | 71.5 | +0.9 |
| Conservative hold | | Swing | | |

General election 2017: Mid Worcestershire
| Party | Candidate | Votes | % | ±% |
|---|---|---|---|---|
| Conservative | Nigel Huddleston | 35,967 | 65.3 | +8.3 |
| Labour | Fred Grindrod | 12,641 | 22.9 | +8.4 |
| Liberal Democrats | Margaret Rowley | 3,450 | 6.3 | −0.9 |
| UKIP | David Greenwood | 1,660 | 3.0 | −14.7 |
| Green | Fay Whitfield | 1,371 | 2.5 | −1.2 |
| Majority | | 23,326 | 42.4 | +3.1 |
| Turnout | | 55,191 | 72.6 | +1.1 |
| Conservative hold | | Swing | | |

General election 2019: Mid Worcestershire
| Party | Candidate | Votes | % | ±% |
|---|---|---|---|---|
| Conservative | Nigel Huddleston | 37,426 | 66.7 | +1.4 |
| Labour | Helen Russell | 9,408 | 16.8 | −6.1 |
| Liberal Democrats | Margaret Rowley | 6,474 | 11.5 | +5.2 |
| Green | Sue Howarth | 2,177 | 3.9 | +1.4 |
| Monster Raving Loony | Barmy Brockman | 638 | 1.1 | New |
| Majority | | 28,018 | 49.9 | +7.5 |
| Turnout | | 56,123 | 71.7 | −0.9 |
| Conservative hold | | Swing | −3.8 | |

=== Elections in the 2020s ===
General election 2024: Droitwich and Evesham
| Party | Candidate | Votes | % | ±% |
|---|---|---|---|---|
| Conservative | Nigel Huddleston | 19,975 | 40.1 | −25.4 |
| Labour | Chipiliro Kalebe-Nyamongo | 10,980 | 22.1 | +5.1 |
| Reform | Sam Bastow | 9,456 | 19.0 | New |
| Liberal Democrats | Oliver Walker | 5,131 | 10.3 | −1.7 |
| Green | Neil Franks | 3,828 | 7.7 | +3.7 |
| SDP | Andrew Flaxman | 239 | 0.5 | New |
| Majority | | 8,995 | 18.1 | |
| Turnout | | 49,609 | 64.7 | –6.2 |
| Registered electors | | 76,624 | | |
| Conservative win (new seat) | | | | |

- Nigel Huddleston (Conservative) ― Incumbent MP for Mid Worcestershire

== See also ==
- Parliamentary constituencies in Herefordshire and Worcestershire
- Parliamentary constituencies in the West Midlands (region)
