= John Romney =

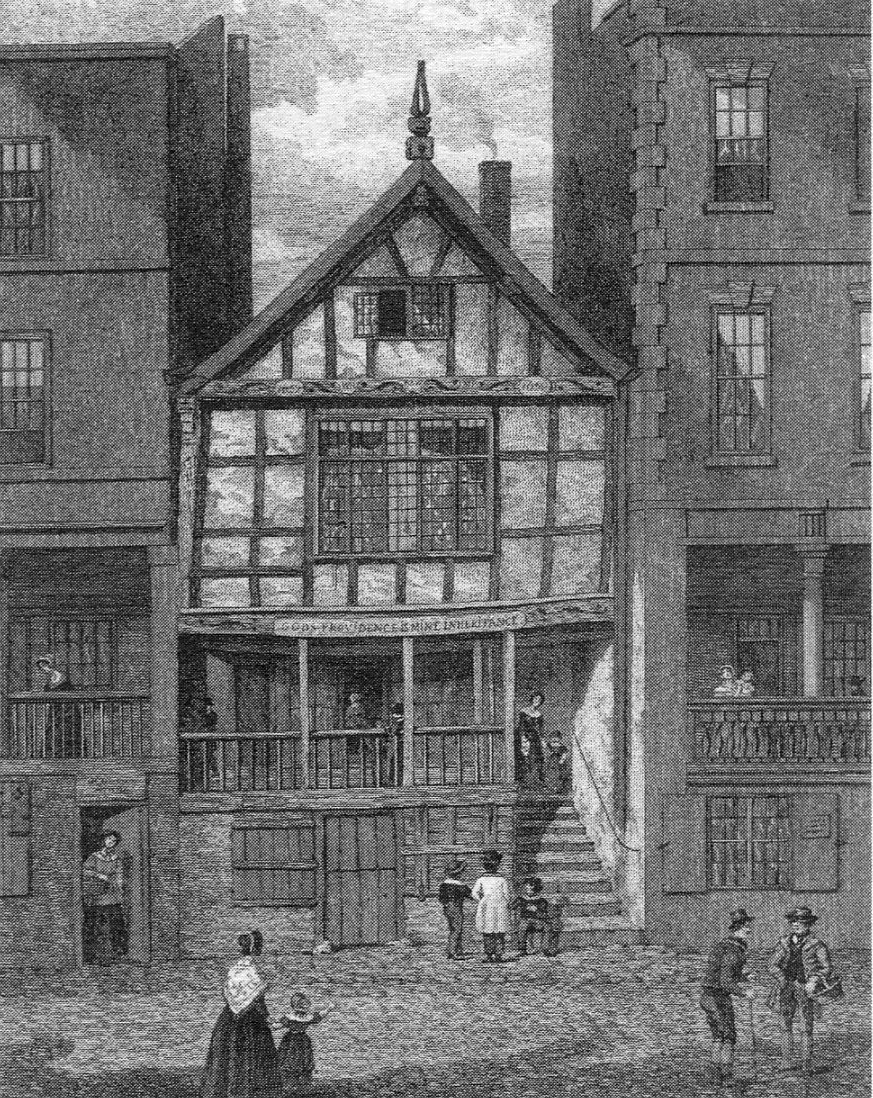
Romney's engraving of a house in Watergate Street, Chester

John Romney (June 1785 – 1 February 1863) was an English artist in printmaking and watercolour who lived and worked in London and Chester. (Note: Romney's date of birth is usually given as 1786 but Foster has discovered that the register of baptisms states it to be June 1785.) Much of his work consisted of reproductions of the work of other artists, but he produced some original prints, paintings and drawings. Like the great majority of contemporary printmakers he worked in both engraving and etching, often on the same plate, and descriptions of his prints as being in one or the other technique should be taken loosely. His best known original prints are series of views of the Chester area and his part of one on the antiquities in the British Museum. He was apparently not related to the famous portraitist George Romney (1734–1802).

== Early life and career in London ==
John Romney was born in Newcastle upon Tyne, the third of seven children of John and Dorothy Romney. His father was a linen draper and the family moved at some time after 1801 to Lambeth in London where John Romney senior continued with his business. John junior was apprenticed to an engraver and in 1807 he won a prize for drawing at the Society of Arts which enabled him to establish himself as a teacher. He exhibited at the Royal Academy in 1807 and 1813. In 1813 he engraved two illustrations after Thomas Stothard for Goldsmith's The Vicar of Wakefield and during the years 1812 to 1845 a series of etchings for the Description of the Collection of Ancient Marbles in the British Museum. In 1829 and 1831 he produced 200 views on 100 plates for Paris and its Environs by Augustus Pugin and C. Heath which was an inspiration for some of his later work in Chester. Amongst his considerable output during this time were five plates for an edition of Hogarth's works in 1833.

== Life and career in Chester ==
In 1810 Romney had married Elizabeth Brooks in Chester, and in 1840 or 1841 he moved with his family to Chester. While living in Chester he produced the works for which he remains best known, two series of engravings of local buildings and views. One of these is entitled Views of Ancient Buildings in Chester. This was produced in two sets, each of 12 engravings, which were published in May 1851 and August 1854. The other consists of 34 engravings entitled Chester and its Environs Illustrated which was produced between 1846 and 1855. Romney's output was not limited to engravings and etchings. In 1845 he exhibited four watercolours and a pencil drawing at the Liverpool Academy; in 1846 and 1847 he exhibited five more watercolours. During this time he was also producing drawings to be reproduced as lithographs. One etching which sold in large numbers was The Chester and Holyhead Railway Bridge Accident which occurred on 24 May 1847 when bridge girders collapsed and four people were killed.

John and Elizabeth Romney had one child, a son Robert Routledge, in 1811. Robert died in February 1857 and in July of that year Elizabeth died. Romney died at his home in Chester in 1863. At that time he owned five houses in the city, but his estate amounted to under £200 (equivalent to £24,000 in 2023).

Eight of Romney's works are in the collection of London's National Portrait Gallery.

== References and notes ==
Notes

Citations

Sources

- Foster, Tony (2009), "John Romney, Artist-Engraver (1785–1863)", Cheshire History, 48, ISSN 0141-8696
