= Swanpool, Lincoln =

Suburb of Lincoln, Lincolnshire, England

Coordinates: 53.2149°N 0.57793626°W

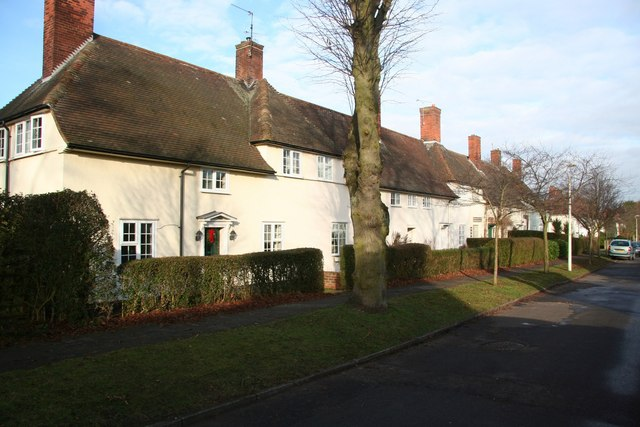
Houses on Hartsholme Drive in Swanpool

Swanpool is a suburb of Lincoln, Lincolnshire, England. It was built in the interwar period as a garden suburb. Architect C H James

== Archaeology ==
An industrial pottery kiln dating to the Roman period was discovered to the northeast of the Swanpool estate and excavated by Graham Webster and Norman Booth in 1945. The kiln produced a wide variety of wares, which were distributed throughout the Roman city of Lindum Colonia and as far as the Humber.
