= Minister for Sport and Civil Society =

UK government junior position

The minister for sport and civil society was a junior minister in the Department for Culture, Media and Sport of the United Kingdom government, with responsibility for sport and Civil Society in England. In 2020, the role merged with that of the Parliamentary Under-Secretary of State for Arts, Heritage and Tourism to become Parliamentary Under-Secretary of State for Sport, Media, Civil Society and Youth.

The post covered sport as well as tourism and heritage. The sports minister has at various times previously reported to the Department for Education and Science (1964–1969), Ministry of Housing and Local Government (1969–1970), Department of the Environment (1970–1990), Department for Education and Science (1990–1992), Department of National Heritage (1992–1997) and Department for Culture, Media and Sport (1997–present).

Sport is a devolved matter in Scotland, Wales and Northern Ireland resting with the corresponding ministers in the Scottish Government, Welsh Government and the Northern Ireland Executive, although when the Northern Ireland Assembly was suspended, responsibility went to the Northern Ireland Office.

Under Margaret Thatcher the office was known as Under-Secretary of State for Sport.

== Current responsibilities ==
- Sport
- Gambling
- Horse racing
- Office for Civil Society
- The National Lottery and society lotteries
- Cross-government work on loneliness

== Ministers for Sport ==
Name	Portrait	Term of office		Political party	Prime Minister
Parliamentary Under-Secretary of State for Sport
Denis Howell		20 October 1964	13 October 1969	Labour	Wilson
Minister of State for Sport
Denis Howell		13 October 1969	24 June 1970	Labour	Wilson
Parliamentary Under-Secretary of State for Sport
Eldon Griffiths		24 June 1970	4 March 1974	Conservative	Heath
Minister of State for Sport
Denis Howell		7 March 1974	3 May 1979	Labour	Wilson
Denis Howell		7 March 1974	3 May 1979	Labour	Callaghan
Parliamentary Under-Secretary of State for Sport
Hector Monro		4 May 1979	13 September 1981	Conservative	Thatcher I
Neil Macfarlane		14 September 1981	2 September 1985	Conservative	Thatcher I
Neil Macfarlane		14 September 1981	2 September 1985	Conservative	Thatcher II
Richard Tracey		7 September 1985	13 June 1987	Conservative	Thatcher II
Colin Moynihan		22 June 1987	26 July 1990	Conservative	Thatcher III
Robert Atkins		26 July 1990	14 April 1992	Conservative	Thatcher III
Robert Atkins		26 July 1990	14 April 1992	Conservative	Major I
Robert Key		14 April 1992	26 May 1993	Conservative	Major II
Iain Sproat		26 May 1993	1 May 1997	Conservative	Major II
Tony Banks		2 May 1997	20 October 1999	Labour	Blair I
Kate Hoey		20 October 1999	7 June 2001	Labour	Blair I
Minister of State for Sport
Richard Caborn		11 June 2001	17 June 2005	Labour	Blair II
Minister of State for Sport and Tourism
Richard Caborn		17 June 2005	28 June 2007	Labour	Blair III
Parliamentary Under-Secretary of State for Sport
Gerry Sutcliffe		29 June 2007	6 May 2010	Labour	Brown
Parliamentary Under-Secretary of State for Sport and the Olympics
Hugh Robertson		14 May 2010	6 September 2012	Conservative	Cameron I
Minister of State for Sport and Olympic Legacy Tourism
Hugh Robertson		6 September 2012	7 October 2013	Conservative	Cameron I
Minister of State for Sport and Tourism
Helen Grant		7 October 2013	12 May 2015	Conservative	Cameron I
Parliamentary Under-Secretary of State for Sport, Heritage, and Tourism
Tracey Crouch		12 May 2015	15 June 2017	Conservative	Cameron II
Tracey Crouch		12 May 2015	15 June 2017	Conservative	May I
Parliamentary Under-Secretary of State for Sport, Civil Society and Loneliness
Tracey Crouch		15 June 2017	1 November 2018	Conservative	May II
Mims Davies		5 November 2018	25 July 2019	Conservative	May II
Minister of State for Sport, Media and Creative Industries
Nigel Adams		24 July 2019	13 February 2020	Conservative	Johnson I
Nigel Adams		24 July 2019	13 February 2020	Conservative	Johnson II
Parliamentary Under-Secretary of State for Sport, Tourism, Heritage and Civil Society
Nigel Huddleston		13 February 2020	7 September 2022	Conservative	Johnson II
Parliamentary Under-Secretary of State for Sport, Arts and Ceremonials
Stuart Andrew		20 September 2022	27 October 2022	Conservative	Truss
Parliamentary Under-Secretary of State for Sport, Tourism and Civil Society
Stuart Andrew		27 October 2022	7 February 2023	Conservative	Sunak
Parliamentary Under-Secretary of State for Sport, Gambling and Civil Society
Stuart Andrew		7 February 2023	5 July 2024	Conservative	Sunak
Parliamentary Under-Secretary of State for Sport, Media, Civil Society and Youth
Stephanie Peacock		9 July 2024	11 September 2025	Labour	Starmer
Parliamentary Under-Secretary of State for Sport, Tourism, Civil Society and Youth
Stephanie Peacock		11 September 2025	Incumbent	Labour	Starmer
