= Boultham Park =

Public park in Lincoln, Lincolnshire, England

Coordinates: 53.209°N 0.558°W

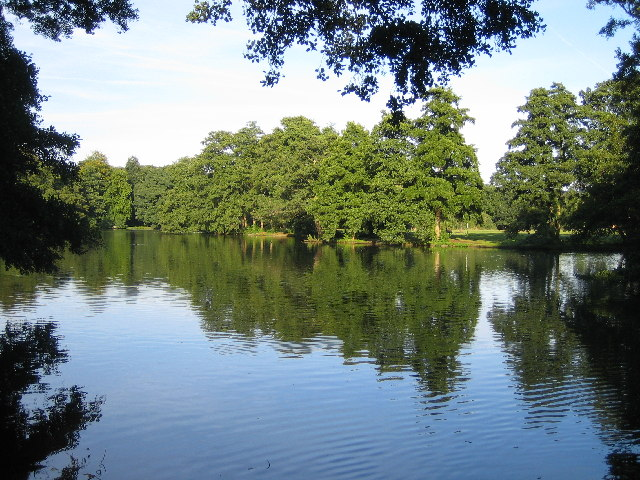
Boultham Park Lake

Boultham Park is a public park in Lincoln, Lincolnshire, England. Originally the park for the Boultham Hall, it was purchased in 1929 by the City of Lincoln Council, and opened as a public park for the people of Lincoln. The house was demolished in 1959. The park is Grade II listed.

== St Helen's Church ==
The park includes a 13th-century church dedicated to Saint Helen. This was restored by C. Hodgson Fowler in 1887. Part of a group parish with nearby Holy Cross parish, which was built when the needs of the parish outgrew St Helen's. St Helen's is now used only occasionally for services. Outside the church is a memorial to the Crimean war, erected in 1858.

== Refurbishment ==
A play area, designed with help from children from nearby St Francis school opened in 2011.

A five-year refurbishment plan was drawn up by the City Council and the Lincolnshire learning disability charity, Linkage Community Trust, and £2.7 million of lottery funding obtained. The plan is to restore and convert the former stable block into an education centre, open a cafe/shop, and build a horticulture centre. Work started in autumn 2013, with initial emphasis on community involvement in improving the park.

== Events ==
A Parkrun takes place in the park every Saturday morning.

A regular summer fair is held, which celebrated its 20th anniversary in 2011.

== See also ==
There are two other grade II parks in Lincoln:

- Hartsholme Country Park
- Lincoln Arboretum
