= List of organisations associated with the Conservative Party (UK) =

This is a list of organisations that are associated with the British Conservative Party. Some are official party organisations, others are organisations made up of party members which are not officially recognised by the party.

== Current ==
- 1922 Committee
- 2020 group
- 92 Group
- Alliance of European Conservatives and Reformists — The conservative Eurosceptic European political party that the Conservative Party was affiliated with when the United Kingdom was in the European Union. The reform of Eurorealism was offered, as opposed to total rejection of the EU (anti-EU-ism).
- Association of Conservative Clubs — An organisation associated with the Conservative Party in the United Kingdom. It represents and provides support to the largest association of political clubs in the country estimated at 1,100.
- Blue Collar Conservativism — Pressure group and parliamentary caucus
- Bow Group — Conservative think tank
- Bright Blue — Think tank and pressure group advocating for liberal conservativism
- Bruges Group — Eurosceptic think tank
- Carlton Club — Gentleman's club in London. The original home of the Conservative Party before the creation of Conservative Central Office.
- Catholics in the Conservative Party — Group promoting the interests of Catholics within the Conservative Party.
- Centre for Policy Studies — Think tank and pressure group
- Centre for Social Justice — Think tank co-founded in 2004 by Iain Duncan Smith, Tim Montgomerie, Mark Florman and Philippa Stroud.
- Conservatives Abroad - recognised organisation of the Party's global network of members and supporters living overseas.
- Conservative Animal Welfare Foundation
- Conservative Business Relations — Business wing
- Conservative Campaign Headquarters — Headquarters of the party
- Conservative Christian Fellowship — Christian wing
- Conservative Co-operative Movement
- Conservative Europe Group
- Conservative Friends of America — an associated organisation founded in 2008 by Lichfield MP Michael Fabricant. Then Leader of the Opposition, David Cameron was made the group's president, and then Shadow Foreign Secretary William Hague was made vice-president. Patrons of the group included Michael Howard and Sir Malcolm Rifkind. In March 2009, the group expanded membership to prospective parliamentary candidates. Its primary focus is on improving United Kingdom–United States relations. The group was an informal successor to The Atlantic Bridge, which was set up in 1997 with the same purpose. The group is associated with Conservatives Abroad.
- Conservative Friends of Cycling
- Conservative Friends of Gibraltar — This was a lobby group within the Conservative Party opposed to any joint sovereignty of Gibraltar with Spain.
- Conservative Friends of India — Focused on India–United Kingdom relations
- Conservative Friends of Israel — Israel–United Kingdom relations
- Conservative Friends of Pakistan — Pakistan–United Kingdom relations
- Conservative Friends of Palestine — British Palestine relations
- Conservative Friends of Russia — Russia–United Kingdom relations
- Conservative Friends of the Chinese — membership organization which engages with the British Chinese community and on British–Chinese relations.
- Conservative Friends of the Union — Scottish Conservatives
- Conservative Friends of Turkey — Turkey–United Kingdom relations
- Conservative Mainstream
- Conservative Middle East Council — Middle Eastern relations
- Conservative Muslim Forum
- Conservative Networks - a peer networking and support group established in 2024 by David Johnston (former government Minister and Conservative MP for Wantage.
- Conservative Party Archive Trust
- Conservative Research Department
- Conservative Technology Forum
- Conservative Trade Unionists
- Conservative Way Forward
- Conservative Women's Organisation
- Conservative Workers & Trade Unionists
- Conservatives Abroad — British Overseas Territories
- Conservatives Together - an organisation to support Conservative activists set up by Grant Shapps (former government Minister and Conservative MP for Welwyn Hatfield).
- Conservatives at Work
- Cornerstone Group
- Countryside Alliance
- COVID Recovery Group — An informal group of Conservative MPs in the who opposed the government's decision to introduce a second period of lockdown measures for England during the COVID-19 pandemic, and who voted against the restrictions.
- European Foundation — Eurosceptic think tank
- European Research Group — Eurosceptic faction of Conservative MPs
- European Young Conservatives — A grouping of youth wings of conservative and centre-right political parties in Europe
- Foreign Affairs Forum of the Conservative Party — Foreign policy unit
- Free Enterprise Group
- Fresh Start Project
- International Democrat Union
- International Young Democrat Union
- LGBT+ Conservatives — LGBT wing of the party
- Margaret Thatcher Foundation
- Masala Monday - A West Midlands Conservative Curry Club
- No Turning Back
- Northern Ireland Conservatives — Branch in Northern Ireland
- Northern Research Group — MPs representing northern England, North Wales and the Scottish borders
- One Nation Conservatives — Parliamentary caucus made up of One-nation conservative Members of Parliament.
- Policy Exchange
- Popular Conservatism
- Reform (think tank)
- Selsdon Group
- Society of Conservative Lawyers
- The Freedom Association
- The Other Club
- Tory Reform Group
- UCUNF
- Welsh Conservatives — branch of the party in Wales
- Young Conservative Europe Group

== Defunct ==
- Activate (organisation)
- The Atlantic Bridge
- Citizen Party (Bristol)
- Conservative Future
- European Democrats
- Junior Carlton Club
- Monday Club
- Municipal Reform Party
- National Liberal Party (UK, 1931)
- National Union of Conservative and Unionist Associations
- No Campaign
- Primrose League
- Ulster Unionist Party
- Unionist Party (Scotland)
- Vermin Club
- Young Britons' Foundation
