= Five Families (Conservative Party) =

As of 2024, there are a number of factions within the British parliamentary Conservative Party which have the informal name of the "Five Families", named after the Five Families of the New York Mafia.

Among the factions that have been described as members of the "Five Families" are:

- The Blue Collar Conservatives, a group that identify as working class MPs
- The Common Sense Group, a group of right-wing MPs.
- The Conservative Growth Group, supporting Liz Truss.
- The European Research Group, a group of Eurosceptic MPs that promoted Brexit.
- The New Conservatives, a parliamentary group of predominantly "Red Wall" Conservative MPs.
- The No Turning Back group, backing Thatcherite policies.
- The Northern Research Group, consisting of MPs elected to seats in Northern England.
- The One Nation Conservatives, consisting of centre-right MPs taking a more moderate to liberal position on social and fiscal policies.
