= Tory Reform Group =

British Conservative Party pressure group

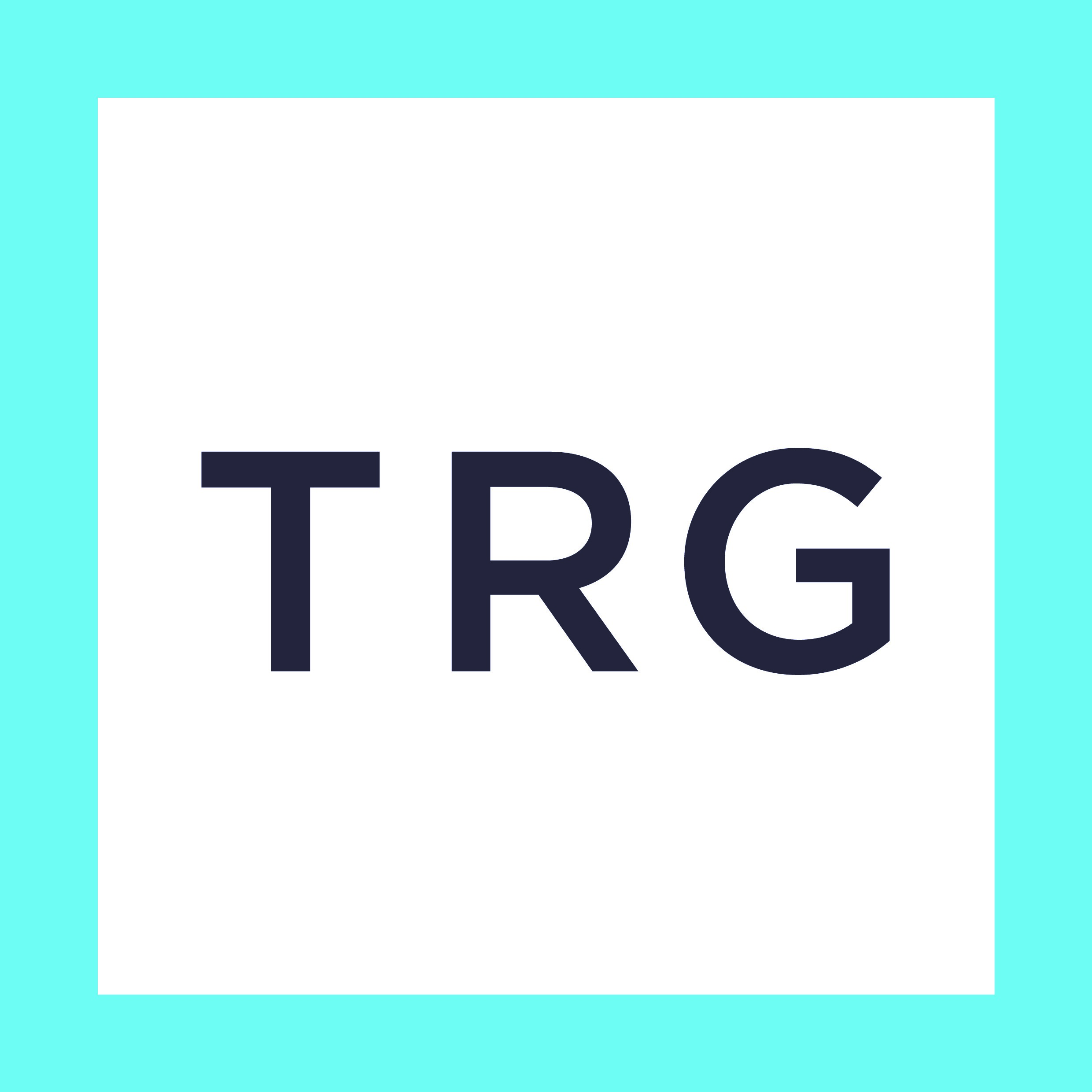
Tory Reform Group logo

The Tory Reform Group (TRG) is a pressure group associated within the British Conservative Party that works to promote "modern, progressive Conservatism [...] economic efficiency and social justice" and "a Conservatism that supports equality, diversity and civil liberties", values sometimes associated with Harold Macmillan's "Middle Way" or what the group consider a moderate one-nation conservatism. Senior figures include Michael Heseltine, Douglas Hurd, Kenneth Clarke, and Chris Patten.

The TRG supported David Cameron, who described TRG as "central to where we need to be in the future". The group has an events programme and publications, principally its journal. Members include parliamentarians, councillors, association officers and private individuals.

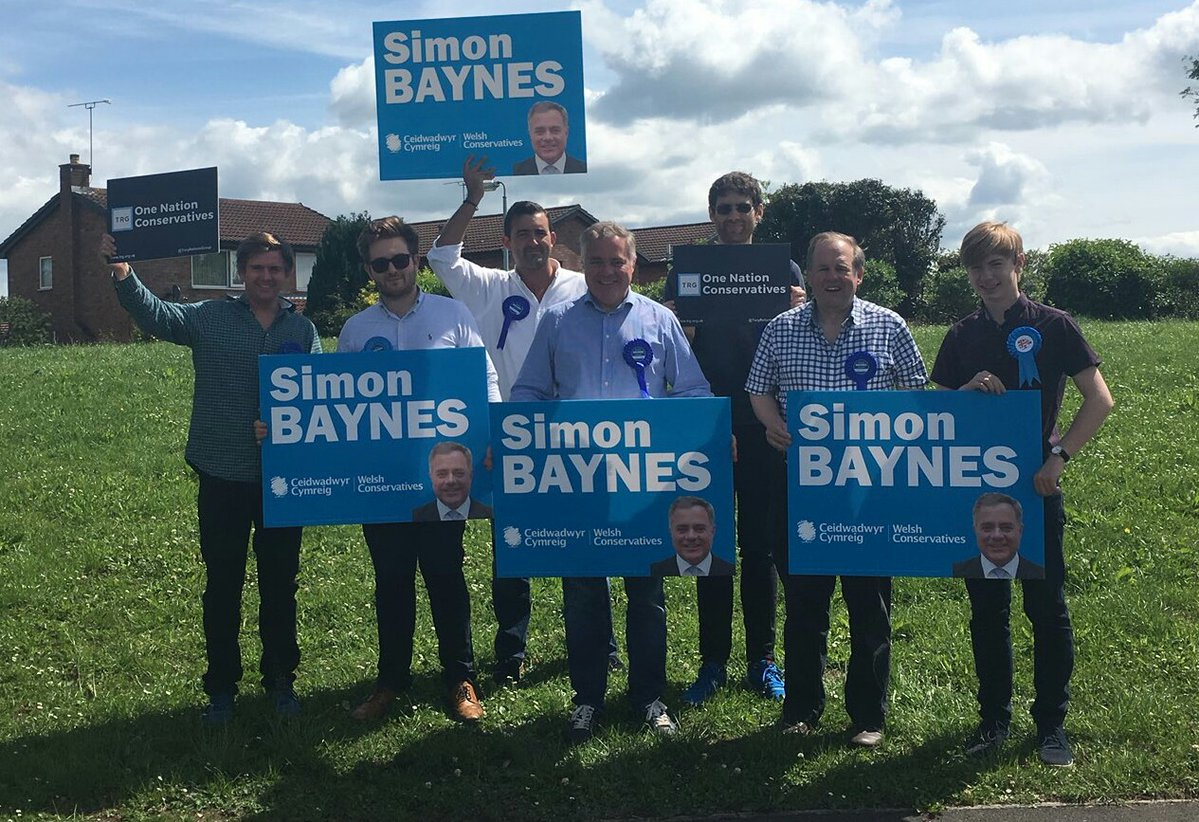
The Tory Reform Group campaigning in Clwyd South for the Welsh Conservative candidate Simon Baynes in 2017.

== History ==
The oldest known branch, which pre-dated the National TRG, was founded in the University of Oxford in 1962, when they split from the Oxford University Conservative Association. This branch disbanded in 2007.

The Tory Reform Group (TRG) was formally established in June 1975 from the merger of four groups: PEST (Pressure for Economic and Social Toryism), two separate London dining clubs called the Macleod Group and Social Tory Action Group, and a consortium in the North West also known as the McLeod Group led by two Young Conservative activists and parliamentary candidates Steve Perry and Stuart Lindsay who had already changed the name to the TRG.

The key figure in the formation of TRG was Peter Walker MP, a former Minister in Heath's Government from 1970 to 1974. Once out of government, he was urged by MPs to form a parliamentary group that represented the liberal Conservative view of the Tory Party.

Walker was reluctant to form such a group at first, not least because he was sensitive to the damaging effects the Tribune Group had wrought on Labour and did not like the idea of similarly factionalising the Conservative Party. As time passed, however, other groups emerged, including right-wing Conservative groups, and the perceived need for a counteracting group increased. At his home in Westminster, Walker met with chairmen of four organisations he had previously had contact with, and they agreed to come together to form the TRG. From the start, the TRG was an activist group with membership, as opposed to being a think tank. The TRG hoped to spread its view through publication of pamphlets, discussion with MPs, use of media, and by widening its membership. Weekly lunches were inherited from PEST. London PEST had organised a Tuesday Luncheon Club in local pubs, such as Magpie and Stump in Old Bailey. These lunches provided a programme of speakers as well as opportunities for members to become involved in constituency activities.

In January 1976, TRG released its first publication, entitled Home Run by Nicholas Scott MP, the President of TRG, arguing for a nationwide extension of the GLC's sale of council houses to their tenants a key part of the Conservative policy platform.

The 1980s saw TRG pitched headlong into some passionate debates within the Conservative Party, including over the direction of economic policy and the apartheid regime in South Africa.

== Ideology ==
The TRG sees itself following the philosophies of Benjamin Disraeli's "One Nation" and Harold Macmillan's "Middle Way". With an interventionist attitude, the TRG was set in the image of historical figures such as Iain Macleod and R.A. Butler.

=== Europe ===
Most of the major pro-EU Conservative politicians of the last thirty years have at one time or another been associated with the Tory Reform Group, including TRG president Ken Clarke, patrons including John Major, and other senior TRG figures such as Damian Green. The TRG was a constituent organisation of Conservative Mainstream alongside the Conservative Europe Group and Parliamentary Mainstream, and at one time were all run from shared offices in Westminster. TRG members formed the core of the short lived Pro-Euro Conservative Party, which disbanded in favour of the Liberal Democrats within three years of being formed. The TRG is commonly seen as supporting the European Union. However, it has no official position on UK membership of the EU and includes many Eurosceptics among its members and supporters.

== Officers ==
- President: The Lord Clarke of Nottingham
- Chairman: Flora Coleman
- Deputy Chairman: Stephanie Reeves
- Patrons: Sir John Major, Lord Bourne of Aberystwyth, David Curry, Stephen Dorrell, Charles Hendry, Michael Heseltine, Lord Hunt of Wirral, Lord Hurd of Westwell, Lord Howard of Lympne, Steven Norris, Chris Patten, Sir Malcolm Rifkind, Sir Timothy Sainsbury, Ian Taylor, Lady Verma, Sir George Young, Richard Fuller, Neil Carmichael.
- Vice-Presidents: Alistair Burt, Damian Green MP, Jonathan Evans, Sir Robert Buckland MP and Jane Ellison.

== Defections from the Conservative Party ==
Some Conservatives, who were also members of the TRG, have defected to parties to the left of the Conservatives. The following TRG members subsequently left the Conservative Party to other parties:

- Liberal Democrats: Emma Nicholson, Susan Bell, Arthur Bell, Hugh Dykes, Lord John Lee, Bill Newton Dunn, Peter Price MEP, Keith Raffan, Anna McCurley, Harold Elletson, Cyril Townsend, Peter Thurnham, Sir Anthony Meyer, Paul Howell MEP
- Labour Party: Shaun Woodward, Alan Howarth, Peter Temple-Morris, Alan Amos, Anthony Nelson, Robert V. Jackson, Judith Symes
- Pro-Euro Conservative Party: John Stevens MEP, Brendan Donnelly MEP, Ian Gilmour, Tim Rathbone, Julian Critchley, Nicholas Scott, David Knox MP, Robert Hicks, Margaret Daly, Adam Fergusson, Madron Seligman, Anthony Simpson
- Social Democratic Party: Stuart Bayless; Tom Hayhoe.
- The Independent Group: Anna Soubry, Stephen Dorrell, Neil Carmichael.

== See also ==
- Conservative Way Forward
