= Conservative Workers & Trade Unionists =

Political party in the UK

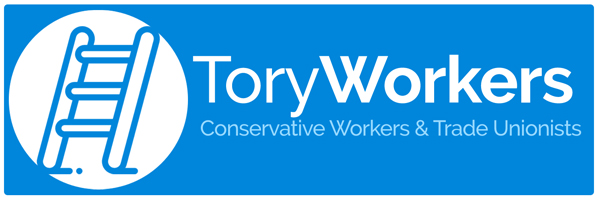
- Founded: 2015
- Honorary President: Robert Halfon, MP
- Director: Spencer Pitfield
- Deputy director: Richard Short
- Parent organisation: Conservative Party

Website
- https://www.unionblue.org.uk

The Conservative Workers & Trade Unionists (CWTU) is an organisation within the British Conservative Party made up of Conservative-supporting trade unionists. in the United Kingdom which aims at reaching out to support working people and trade unionists. It is focused on improving employment rights, tackling low pay, raising productivity and supporting greater employment satisfaction.

The organisation was founded by Robert Halfon MP, former deputy chairman of the Conservative Party and Spencer Pitfield, former director of the Conservative Policy Forum. Spencer Pitfield is the organisation's current director. Richard Short is the deputy director. He was the Conservative Parliamentary Candidate for Warrington North at the 2015 general election.

== Principles ==
- Britain should be a country that works for everyone
- Working people create wealth for their families and communities
- Working people deserve fulfillment and health across their lives
- Businesses, workers and government all have responsibility to improve productivity
- Society should always value and support hard working people
- There should be a constructive working relationship between the Conservative Party and Trade Unions.

== See also ==
- Conservatives at Work
- Blue Collar Conservatism
- New Conservatives
