= Nick Herbert, Baron Herbert of South Downs =

British politician

The Right Honourable The Lord Herbert of South Downs CBE PC
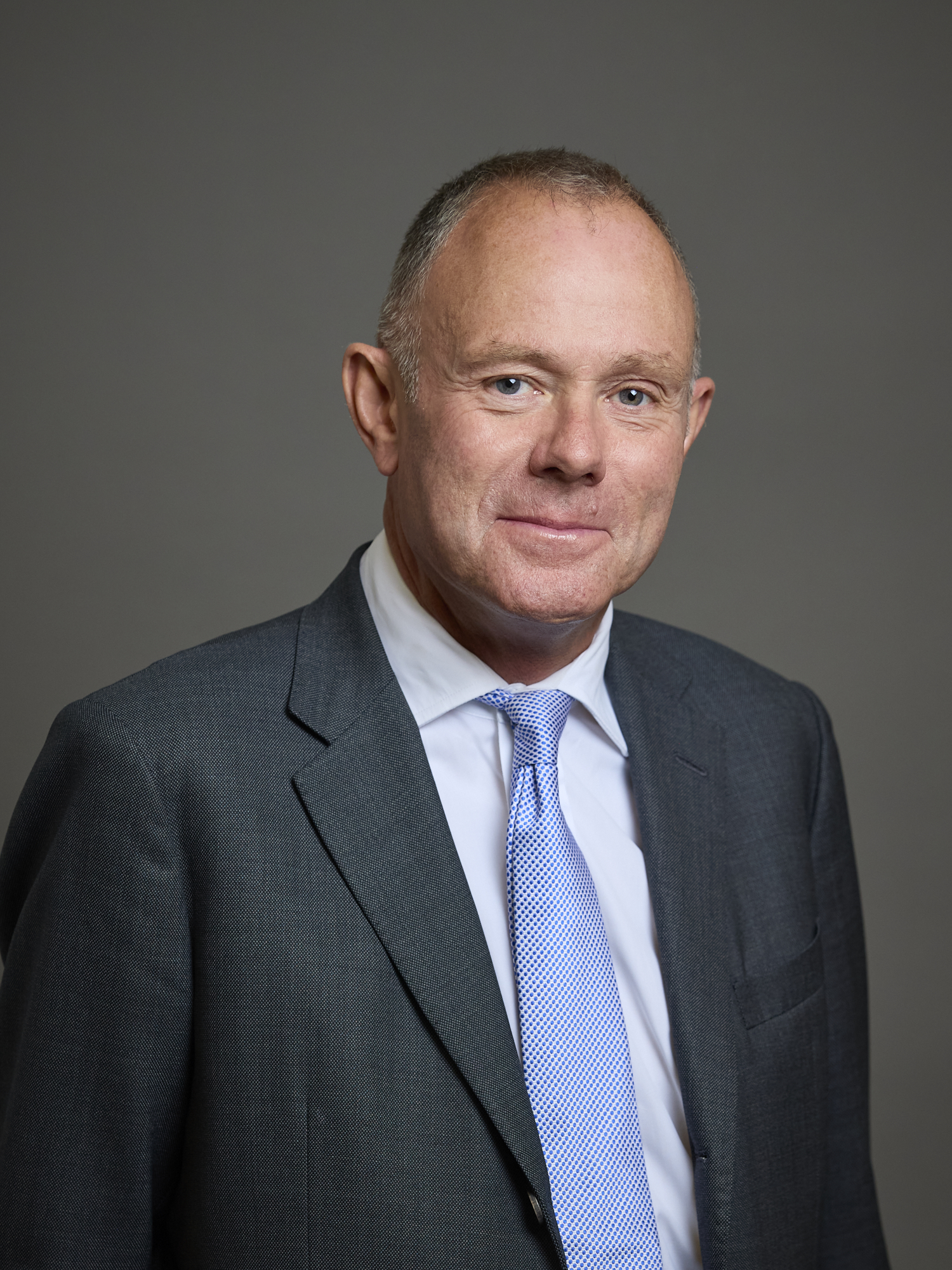
- Official portrait, 2025

Minister of State for Policing and Criminal Justice
- In office 13 May 2010 – 4 September 2012
- Prime Minister: David Cameron
- Preceded by: David Hanson (Note: As Minister of State for Security, Counter-Terrorism, Crime and Policing.)
- Succeeded by: Damian Green

Shadow Secretary of State for Environment, Food and Rural Affairs
- In office 19 January 2009 – 11 May 2010
- Leader: David Cameron
- Preceded by: Peter Ainsworth
- Succeeded by: Hilary Benn

Shadow Secretary of State for Justice
- In office 2 July 2007 – 19 January 2009
- Leader: David Cameron
- Preceded by: Oliver Heald
- Succeeded by: Dominic Grieve

Member of the House of Lords
- Lord Temporal
- Life peerage 1 September 2020

Member of Parliament for Arundel and South Downs
- In office 5 May 2005 – 6 November 2019
- Preceded by: Howard Flight
- Succeeded by: Andrew Griffith

Personal details
- Born: Nicholas Le Quesne Herbert; 7 April 1963 (age 63) Cambridge, England
- Party: Conservative
- Domestic partner: Jason Eades
- Education: Magdalene College, Cambridge
- Website: Official website

Nicholas Le Quesne Herbert, Baron Herbert of South Downs, CBE, PC (born 7 April 1963) is a British Conservative Party politician and was the Member of Parliament (MP) for Arundel and South Downs from 2005 to 2019. He was Minister of State for Police and Criminal Justice, with his time split between the Home Office and the Ministry of Justice, from 2010 to 2012. On 5 November 2019 he announced his decision not to stand for re-election in the 2019 general election. On 31 July 2020 Prime Minister Boris Johnson announced that Herbert would enter the House of Lords.

== Background ==
Herbert was educated at Haileybury and Magdalene College, Cambridge, where he studied law and land economy. After Cambridge, he worked for the Conservative Research Department on the Rural & Environmental bureau. He went on to be appointed as the director of public affairs at the British Field Sports Society in 1990 and remained in that position for six years, from which he helped to form the Countryside Movement, which later became the Countryside Alliance.

He joined Business for Sterling in 1998 as its chief executive where he led the launch of the No Campaign against adopting the Euro currency, and hired a young Dominic Cummings as campaign director, giving Cummings his first job in politics. The campaign succeeded in retaining pound sterling, forcing the (pro-Euro) Prime Minister, Tony Blair, to keep to his Chancellor of the Exchequer Gordon Brown's five economic tests. It was also instrumental in persuading the Conservative Party to include a "save the pound" pledge in their manifesto for the 2001 general election.

Following this, in 2001 Herbert and Andrew Haldenby founded the think tank Reform, which argued that improving public services need not require increasing taxation and public spending. Herbert was Reform's first director.

== Political career ==
Herbert unsuccessfully contested the Northumberland seat of Berwick-upon-Tweed at the 1997 general election where he finished in third place some 8,951 votes behind the veteran Liberal Democrat MP Alan Beith.

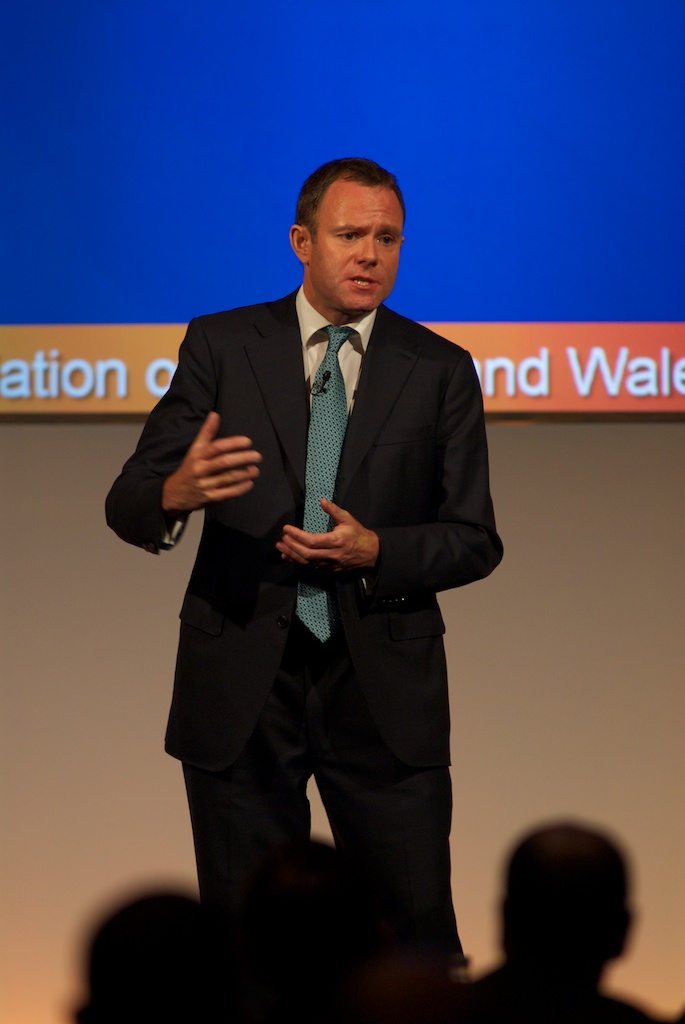
Herbert as Police Minister speaking at a policing conference, September 2010

His selection to contest the safely Conservative West Sussex seat of Arundel and South Downs at the 2005 general election did not come about without incident. The sitting Conservative MP, Howard Flight, had been forced to resign as a vice chairman of the party and had the whip removed by Michael Howard in 2005 after he had told a Conservative Way Forward meeting that the Conservatives would have to make more cuts than they were promising. With no whip, he was not considered as an approved candidate and, despite protest and the local association refusing to select a new candidate, he finally resigned just a month before the election. Herbert was then selected as the new Conservative candidate, ahead of future MPs Anne Marie Morris and Laura Sandys, despite Herbert writing an article in The Spectator that the vice-president of the Arundel and South Downs Conservatives had felt was much more radical than Flight's rhetoric. In his Spectator article, Herbert had argued in favour of privatising the NHS and the education system. He was elected as the Conservative MP for Arundel and South Downs at the 2005 general election, holding the seat with a slightly reduced majority of 11,309. He made his maiden speech on 6 June 2005.

=== Shadow Cabinet ===
Following his election to Parliament, Herbert joined the Home Affairs Select Committee. After David Cameron became leader of the Conservative Party, Herbert was appointed as a Shadow Minister for home affairs on 16 December 2005. This meant he had to leave the Home Affairs Select Committee. In July 2007, he joined the Shadow Cabinet for the new position of Shadow Secretary of State for Justice, shadowing veteran Labour minister Jack Straw. On 19 January 2009 he was made Shadow Secretary of State for Environment, Food and Rural Affairs.

=== Government ===
On the Coalition forming between the Conservatives and Liberal Democrats in May 2010, Herbert was appointed as a Minister of State at the Home Office with responsibility for policing and at the Ministry of Justice with responsibility for criminal justice. Herbert was appointed a Privy Counsellor on 9 June 2010.

As police minister, Herbert opposed the introduction of rules prohibiting undercover police officers from entering into sexual relationships with people they are monitoring. He also championed the introduction of elected Police and Crime Commissioners to replace police authorities.

Herbert decided to step down from Government at the time of David Cameron's first major reshuffle in September 2012.

=== Backbenches ===
Herbert formed, and co-chaired, the All Party Parliamentary Group on Global TB, and in 2014 launched the Global TB Caucus which he co-chairs with South Africa's Health Minister, Aaron Motsoaledi, initiating the Barcelona Declaration with a speech to the World Lung Conference.

In 2014 he launched GovernUp, a cross-party project which aims to promote government reform. He authored Why Vote Conservative 2015? ahead of the general election that year.

Herbert supported the legalisation of same-sex marriage, launching the Freedom to Marry campaign in 2012 ahead of the successful Marriage (Same Sex Couples) Act 2013. In June 2015, Herbert helped to launch, and became the first chair, of the All-Party Parliamentary Group on Global LGBT Rights.

In January 2016, Herbert launched Conservatives for Reform in Europe, a campaign to remain in the European Union, subject to the Prime Minister's renegotiations. He was opposed to Brexit prior to the 2016 referendum.

In October 2019, Herbert rejoined the Countryside Alliance, of which he was a founder, as chairman.

In November 2019, Herbert announced his resignation as MP in order to focus on his other campaign roles on rural issues, central governance reform, combatting tuberculosis and securing LGBT rights worldwide.

== Post-Commons career ==
Herbert has been Chair of the Countryside Alliance since October 2019.

In the morning of 1 September 2020 he was created Baron Herbert of South Downs, of Arundel in the County of West Sussex. Lord Herbert made his maiden speech on 1 October 2020, a month after entering the Lords.

From January 2021, Herbert was appointed Chair of College of Policing.

In May 2021, he was appointed the UK's Special Envoy on LGBT Rights.

== Personal life ==
Herbert has enjoyed fox hunting since his childhood, spending 14 years as master of the Newmarket Beagles. Prior to that he was master of the Trinity Foot Beagles and also hunted with the Essex Foxhounds and followed the Cambridgeshire Harriers.

Herbert joined his long-term partner, Jason Eades, in civil partnership in early January 2009. They have been in a relationship since 1999.

== Notes ==
Parliament of the United Kingdom
Preceded by Howard Flight	Member of Parliament for Arundel and South Downs; 2005–2019	Succeeded by Andrew Griffith
Political offices
Preceded by Oliver Heald	Shadow Secretary of State for Justice; 2007–2009	Succeeded by Dominic Grieve
Preceded by Peter Ainsworth	Shadow Secretary of State for Environment, Food and Rural Affairs; 2009–2010	Succeeded by Hilary Benn
Preceded by David Hanson as Minister of State for Security, Counterterrorism, Crime and Policing	Minister of State for Policing and Criminal Justice; 2010–2012	Succeeded by Damian Green
Orders of precedence in the United Kingdom
Preceded by The Lord Frost	Gentlemen; Baron Herbert of South Downs	Succeeded by The Lord Vaizey of Didcot
