= Arundel and South Downs =

UK Parliament constituency (since 1997)

Coordinates: 50.928°N 0.455°W

- County constituency for the House of Commons
- Boundaries since 2024
- Boundary of Arundel and South Downs in South East England
- County: West Sussex
- Population: 97,267 (2011 census)
- Electorate: 76,974 (2023)
- Major settlements: Arundel, Midhurst, Petworth, Pulborough, Steyning and Storrington

Current constituency
- Created: 1997
- Member of Parliament: Andrew Griffith (Conservative)
- Seats: One
- Created from: Arundel and Horsham

Arundel and South Downs (/ˈærʊndəl/) is a constituency in West Sussex created in 1997 and represented in the House of Commons of the UK Parliament by Andrew Griffith, a Conservative, since 2019.

== Constituency profile ==
The constituency is rural and agricultural. It is located in the county of West Sussex and lies almost entirely within the South Downs National Park. It contains a number of small towns and villages; the largest settlements are the towns of Steyning and Storrington, each with populations of around 6,000, and other small towns in the constituency include Arundel, Midhurst and Petworth. Residents of the constituency are considerably older and wealthier than the national average, and 97% of the population are white.

Parts of the constituency lie within the Chichester, Horsham and Arun local government districts, all of which are currently controlled entirely or partly by the Liberal Democrats but were historically under Conservative control. Voters in the constituency were evenly balanced between supporting and opposing Brexit in the 2016 referendum.

== Boundaries ==
1997–2010: Following their review of parliamentary boundaries in West Sussex which Parliament approved in 1995, the Boundary Commission for England formed new constituencies. As created in 1997, the seat was constituted as follows:

- The following wards of the District of Arun, namely, Aldingbourne, Angmering, Arundel, Barnham, Findon and Walberton;
- The Bury ward of the District of Chichester;
- The following wards of the District of Horsham, namely, Bramber and Upper Beeding, Chanctonbury, Henfield, Pulborough, Steyning, Storrington, Sullington, West Chiltington and West Grinstead; and
- The Bolney, Clayton, Hurstpierpoint and Keymer wards of the District of Mid Sussex.

In their recommendations, the Boundary Commission for England mooted the name Chanctonbury after uninhabited Chanctonbury Ring, an ancient hill fort at its centre. This name was rejected during the local inquiry process at which the current name was chosen.

Map of boundaries 2010–2024

2010–2024: Following their review of parliamentary boundaries in West Sussex which Parliament approved in 2007, the Boundary Commission for England recommended the constituency be composed of:

- The Arun District wards of: Angmering, Arundel, Barnham, Findon, and Walberton
- The Chichester District wards of: Bury, Petworth, and Wisborough Green
- The Horsham District wards of: Bramber, Upper Beeding and Woodmancote, Chanctonbury, Chantry, Cowfold, Partridge Green, Shermanbury and West Grinstead, Henfield, Pulborough and Coldwaltham, and Steyning
- The Mid Sussex District wards of: Hassocks, and Hurstpierpoint and Downs

2024–present: Further to the 2023 Periodic Review of Westminster constituencies which came into force for the 2024 general election, the constituency is currently composed of the following (as they existed on 1 December 2020):

- The District of Arun wards of: Arundel & Walberton; Barnham; Felpham East (polling district BHOE).
- The District of Chichester wards of: Easebourne; Fernhurst; Fittleworth; Goodwood (polling districts GWBX, GWEA, GWED, GWSI and GWUP); Harting; Loxwood; Midhurst; Petworth.
- The District of Horsham wards of: Bramber, Upper Beeding & Woodmancote; Henfield; Pulborough, Coldwaltham & Amberley; Steyning & Ashurst; Storrington & Washington; West Chiltington, Thakeham & Ashington.

The electorate was reduced to bring it within the permitted range by transferring out the two District of Mid Sussex wards and the Horsham District ward of Cowfold, Shermanbury & West Grinstead to their respectively-named constituencies; the District of Arun ward of Angmering & Findon was transferred to Worthing West. To partly compensate, the constituency was extended further northwards and westwards into Chichester, gaining the town of Midhurst.

== History ==
=== Results and EU referendum stance ===
The constituency has been one of the safest Conservative seats since its creation in 1997. The 2024 result saw the eight consecutive victory for the Conservative Party; all wards, with the exception of Harting, voted for the Conservative candidate.

Second-place runners-up have been, listed in order, four times a Liberal Democrat, once the UKIP candidate and once the Labour candidate. In line with regional trends, the highest percentage of the vote among these was the Liberal Democrat in 2010, with 27.9% of the vote.

In June 2016, an estimated 50.3% of local adults voting in the EU membership referendum chose to remain in the European Union instead of to leave. This was defied in two January 2018 votes in Parliament by its MP, in line with his governing party's promise to adhere to the overall result of that referendum.

The 2015–2017 status was as the 8th safest of the Conservative Party's 331 seats by percentage of majority.

=== De-selection of incumbent seeking re-election in 2005 ===
The incumbent Howard Flight MP had national media coverage in the run-up to the 2005 general election due to his deselection requested by the party leader for membership of Conservative Way Forward, lobbying for spending cuts to be more severe than set out in the small cuts in the 2005 manifesto. Flight hinted his preferred cuts would be as implemented by a Conservative government in his view. He had represented the constituency since its creation at the 1997 general election. Anne Marie Morris, Laura Sandys and Nick Herbert put themselves forward for nomination as replacement candidates. The chosen candidate, Nick Herbert, won the seat at the election. Morris and Sandys became MPs elsewhere in 2010.

=== Predecessor seats ===
The seat and its predecessors have in the 20th century been a Conservative Party stronghold save that the minor contributory Horsham seat to the area's electorate saw victory by 8.6% of the vote over the Labour Party in 1966, followed statistically by a next-most-marginal victory again with the Labour Party as runner-up, in 1950, of 14.4%.

Between 1974 and 1983, much of the South Downs area was part of the Shoreham constituency, with the town of Arundel remaining in the Arundel constituency.

Prior to 1974, the seat was largely part of the Arundel and Shoreham constituency.

== Members of Parliament ==
Arundel and Horsham prior to 1997

Election	Member	Party
1997	Howard Flight	Conservative
2005	Nick Herbert	Conservative
2019	Andrew Griffith	Conservative

== Elections ==
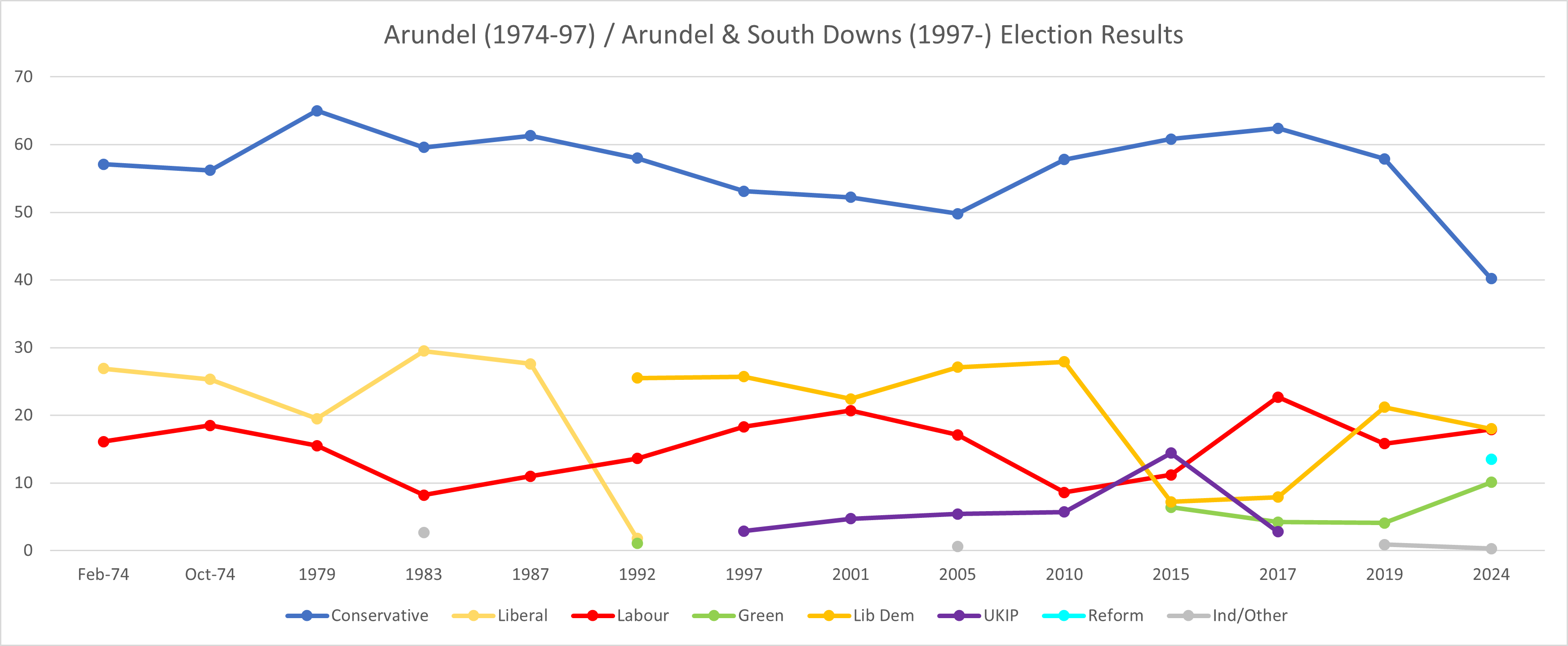
Arundel (1974–1997) / Arundel and South Downs (1997–) election results

=== Elections in the 2020s ===
General election 2024: Arundel and South Downs
Party	Candidate	Votes	%	±%
Conservative	Andrew Griffith	22,001	40.2	▼20.2
Liberal Democrats	Richard Allen	9,867	18.0	▼1.0
Labour	Chris Philipsborn	9,782	17.9	▲2.2
Reform	David Thomas	7,391	13.5	new
Green	Steve McAuliff	5,515	10.1	▲6.1
SDP	Mike Smith	184	0.3	new
Majority		12,134	22.2	▼19.3
Turnout		54,740	70.5	▼5.0
Registered electors		77,969		
Conservative hold		Swing	▼9.6	

=== Elections in the 2010s ===
2019 notional result
Party	Vote	%
Conservative	35,117	60.4
Liberal Democrats	11,012	19.0
Labour	9,108	15.7
Green	2,312	4.0
Others	556	1.0
Turnout	58,105	75.5
Electorate	76,974	

General election 2019: Arundel and South Downs
Party	Candidate	Votes	%	±%
Conservative	Andrew Griffith	35,566	57.9	▼4.5
Liberal Democrats	Alison Bennett	13,045	21.2	▲13.3
Labour	Bella Sankey	9,722	15.8	▼6.9
Green	Isabel Thurston	2,519	4.1	▼0.1
Independent	Robert Wheal	556	0.9	New
Majority		22,521	36.7	▼3.0
Turnout		61,408	75.1	▼0.7
Registered electors		81,726		
Conservative hold		Swing	▼8.9	

General election 2017: Arundel and South Downs
Party	Candidate	Votes	%	±%
Conservative	Nick Herbert	37,573	62.4	▲1.6
Labour	Caroline Fife	13,690	22.7	▲11.5
Liberal Democrats	Shweta Kapadia	4,783	7.9	▲0.7
Green	Jo Prior	2,542	4.2	▼2.2
UKIP	John Wallace	1,668	2.8	▼11.6
Majority		23,883	39.7	▼6.7
Turnout		60,256	75.8	▲2.7
Registered electors		79,478		
Conservative hold		Swing	▼5.0	

General election 2015: Arundel and South Downs
Party	Candidate	Votes	%	±%
Conservative	Nick Herbert	34,331	60.8	▲3.0
UKIP	Peter Grace	8,154	14.4	▲8.7
Labour	Christopher Wellbelove	6,324	11.2	▲2.6
Liberal Democrats	Shweta Kapadia	4,062	7.2	▼20.7
Green	Isabel Thurston	3,606	6.4	New
Majority		26,177	46.4	▲16.5
Turnout		56,477	73.1	▲0.9
Registered electors		77,242		
Conservative hold		Swing	▲2.9	

General election 2010: Arundel and South Downs
Party	Candidate	Votes	%	±%
Conservative	Nick Herbert	32,333	57.8	▲8.0
Liberal Democrats	Derek Deedman	15,642	27.9	▲0.8
Labour	Tim Lunnon	4,835	8.6	▼8.5
UKIP	Stuart Bower	3,172	5.7	▲0.3
Majority		16,691	29.9	▲8.2
Turnout		55,982	72.2	▲3.7
Registered electors		76,835		
Conservative hold		Swing	▲3.6	

=== Elections in the 2000s ===
General election 2005: Arundel and South Downs
Party	Candidate	Votes	%	±%
Conservative	Nick Herbert	24,752	49.8	▼2.4
Liberal Democrats	Derek Deedman	13,443	27.1	▲4.7
Labour	Elizabeth Whitlam	8,482	17.1	▼3.6
UKIP	Andrew Moffat	2,700	5.4	▲0.7
Protest Vote Party	Mark Stack	313	0.6	New
Majority		11,309	22.7	▼6.9
Turnout		49,690	68.5	▲3.8
Registered electors		72,535		
Conservative hold		Swing	▼3.5	

General election 2001: Arundel and South Downs
Party	Candidate	Votes	%	±%
Conservative	Howard Flight	23,969	52.2	▼0.9
Liberal Democrats	Derek R. Deedman	10,265	22.4	▼3.3
Labour	Charles S. Taylor	9,488	20.7	▲2.4
UKIP	Robert Perrin	2,167	4.7	▲1.8
Majority		13,704	29.8	▲2.4
Turnout		45,889	64.7	▼10.8
Registered electors		70,956		
Conservative hold		Swing	▲1.3	

=== Elections in the 1990s ===
General election 1997: Arundel and South Downs
Party	Candidate	Votes	%	±%
Conservative	Howard Flight	27,251	53.1	N/A
Liberal Democrats	John Goss	13,216	25.7	N/A
Labour	Richard Black	9,376	18.3	N/A
UKIP	James Herbert	1,494	2.9	N/A
Majority		14,035	27.4	N/A
Turnout		51,337	75.5	N/A
Registered electors		68,010		
Conservative win (new seat)				

== See also ==
- List of parliamentary constituencies in West Sussex
- List of parliamentary constituencies in the South East England (region)

== Sources ==
- Election result, 2005 (BBC)
- Election results, 1997 – 2001 (BBC)
- Election results, 1997 – 2001 (Election Demon)
- Election results, 1997 – 2005 (Guardian)
