= Howard Flight =

British politician (1948–2026)

The Right Honourable The Lord Flight
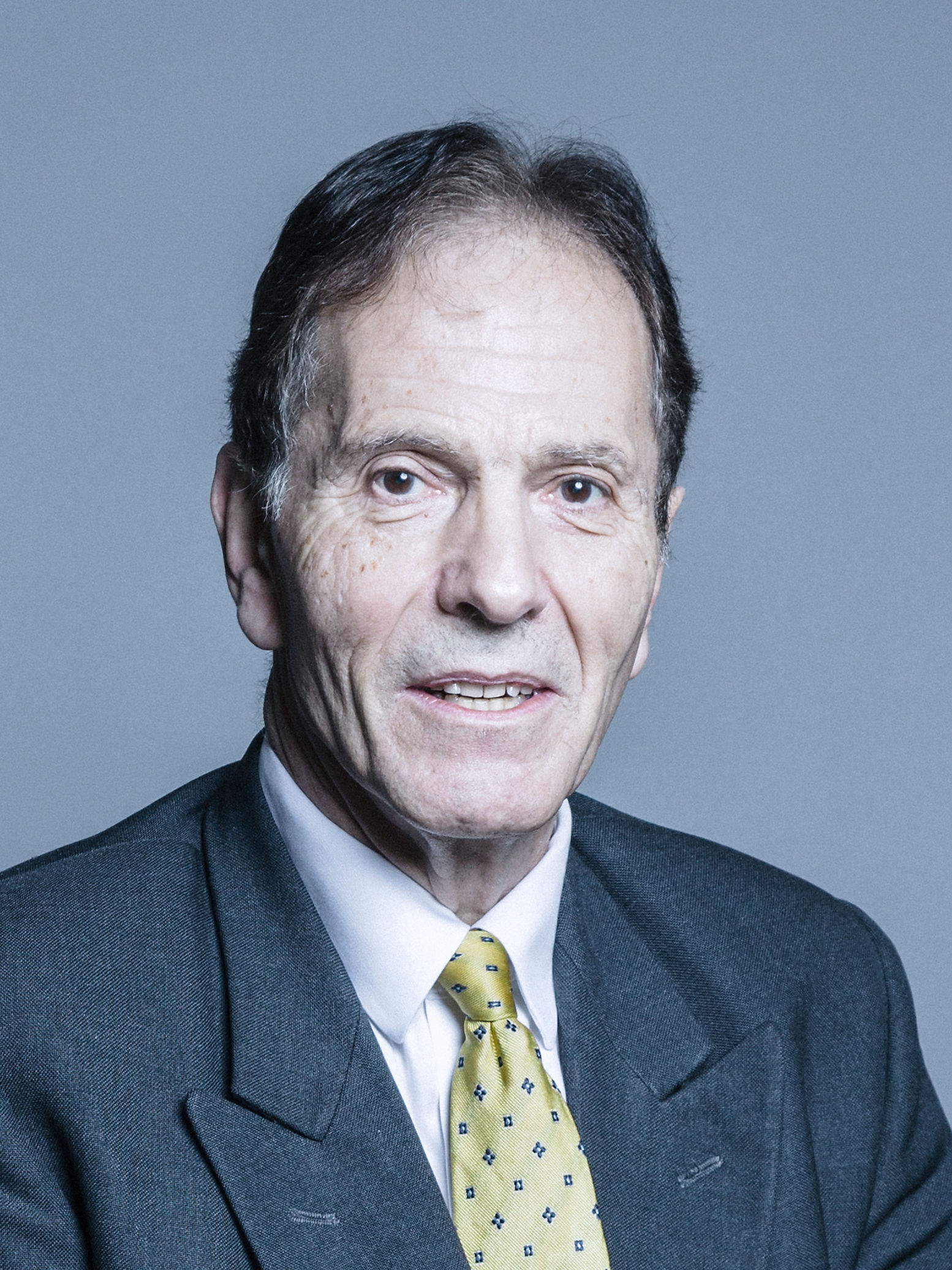
- Official portrait, 2018

Deputy Chairman of the Conservative Party
- In office 1 December 2004 – 1 March 2005
- Leader: Michael Howard

Shadow Chief Secretary to the Treasury
- In office 23 July 2002 – 14 July 2004
- Leader: Iain Duncan Smith; Michael Howard
- Preceded by: John Bercow
- Succeeded by: George Osborne

Member of Parliament for Arundel and South Downs
- In office 1 May 1997 – 11 April 2005
- Preceded by: Constituency established
- Succeeded by: Nick Herbert

Member of the House of Lords
- Lord Temporal
- Life peerage 13 January 2011 – 24 January 2026

Personal details
- Born: 16 June 1948 Romford, Essex, England
- Died: 24 January 2026 (aged 77)
- Party: Conservative
- Spouse: Christabel Flight (m. 1974)
- Children: 4
- Education: University of Michigan (MBA); Magdalene College, Cambridge (BA)
- Occupation: Politician

Howard Emerson Flight, Baron Flight (16 June 1948 – 24 January 2026) was a British Conservative politician who was a member of the House of Lords after serving as a Member of Parliament for Arundel and South Downs from 1997 to 2005. He held several shadow cabinet posts: Shadow Economic Secretary to the Treasury from 1999 to 2001, Shadow Paymaster General from 2001 to 2002, and Shadow Chief Secretary to the Treasury from 2002 to 2004.

== Background ==
Howard Flight was born on June 16, 1948 in Romford, United Kingdom. He was the son of Bernard Flight, regional head of the Westminster Bank’s trustee department, and his wife, Doris Parker. Flight was educated at Brentwood School, Magdalene College, Cambridge and the University of Michigan's Ross School of Business. From 1970 to 1998 he worked as an investment adviser and director in various banks. Flight was author of All you Need to know about Exchange Rates (1989), and contributor to the book The City in Europe and the World (2005). He was married to Christabel from 1974 to his death; they had four children: Kitty, Thomas, Josie and Maryanne. His wife, entitled to be known as Lady Flight, was previously a councillor representing Warwick ward on Westminster City Council, and served as Lord mayor of Westminster.

Flight died on 24 January 2026, at the age of 77.

== Political career ==
Flight stood unsuccessfully for Parliament for Bermondsey in the February and October 1974 general elections.

He resigned as Deputy Chairman of the Conservative Party on 24 March 2005, following comments made at a Conservative Way Forward meeting that was being secretly recorded. In the meeting he stated that the Conservatives in office could make more spending cuts than they were promising in their campaign (including in their manifesto) before the general election. Conservative leader Michael Howard that month withdrew the party whip, and announced that Flight was no longer an approved candidate and could not contest the Arundel and South Downs seat as a Conservative party candidate at the 2005 general election. Flight refused to accept this, maintaining that only his constituency Conservative Association had the power to deselect its candidate. On 29 March 2005 he announced that he had an opinion from a Queen's Counsel (an eminent barrister) confirming this view. The Arundel and South Downs Conservative Association initially refused to seek a new candidate, but it reversed its position when Conservative Central Office threatened it with the "Slough treatment", referring to the suspension of that association for refusing to deselect Adrian Hilton. Amid speculation, Flight confirmed that he would not stand as an independent and would not oppose any decision by the Association to deselect him.

=== Elections ===
On 6 April, Flight was deselected as a Conservative candidate by then-party leader Michael Howard, and removed from his role as party deputy chairman, and his party began the process of selecting a new last-minute candidate. Anne Marie Morris, Laura Sandys, and Nick Herbert put themselves forward for nomination as replacement candidates. The chosen candidate, Nick Herbert, won the seat at the election.

Some years later, after a change of party leader, Flight was placed on the A-List of Conservative Party candidates available to fight the 2010 general election, but in the event he was one of minority on that list not selected as a candidate in open primaries and/or with party recommendation. On 19 November 2010, it was announced that Flight was to be created a life peer and would sit as a Conservative in the House of Lords. His full title, created 13 January 2011, was Baron Flight, of Worcester in the County of Worcestershire.

On 25 November 2010, a week after the announcement of his intended peerage, Flight apologised after suggesting that the government's changes to child benefits would "discourage the middle classes from breeding, but for those on benefits there is every incentive".

=== Peerage received and other roles ===
Flight was raised to the peerage in January 2011. He was a director of companies, including Investec, a venture capital company, his own private equity company, and was chairman of the Entrepreneurs Investment Scheme (EIS) Association of lawyers and accountants, a trustee and Vice President of the Elgar Foundation, a Member of the Advisory Boards of the Centre for Policy Studies, Institute of Economic Affairs and Financial Services Forum.

== Arms ==
Coat of arms of Howard Flight
Coronet Coronet of a Baron Crest Issuant from an Eastern Crown, a pair of Wings Or, between them a Saracen's Head couped at the shoulders Sable, ducally crowned Or, and issuant therefrom a Long Cap the top turned forward Sable. Escutcheon Sable, on a Chevron Or, between three Bezants, each charged with a Cony courant Sable, a Fleur-de-lis between two Doves respectant Sable. Supporters Dexter: a Bengal Tiger proper, resting the interior hind-foot on a Bezant. Sinister: a Chinese Dragon Or, armed Gules, resting the interior hind-foot on a Bezant. Motto DEI TUTAMEN TUTIS (Safely protected by God)

Parliament of the United Kingdom
New constituency	Member of Parliament for Arundel and South Downs; 1997–2005	Succeeded by Nick Herbert
Political offices
Preceded by John Bercow	Shadow Chief Secretary to the Treasury; 2002–2004	Succeeded by George Osborne
Party political offices
Preceded by	Deputy Chairman of the Conservative Party; 2004–2005	Succeeded by
