= Red Wall Caucus =

Group of UK Labour Party politicians

- Leader and convener: Alan Strickland
- Founded: 2024
- National affiliation: Labour Party
- Parliamentary Labour Party: 43 / 402
- House of Commons: 43 / 650

The Red Wall Caucus is a British political caucus and pressure group of backbench Labour MPs who represent red wall seats in the House of Commons. It was founded in November 2025 by Bassetlaw MP Jo White. Newton Aycliffe and Spennymoor MP Alan Strickland was elected chair of the group in September 2026 after White was appointed to Parliamentary Under-Secretary of State at the Home Office.

The Red Wall Caucus focuses on issues which it sees as affecting Labour's traditional working class voter base in particular, such as the cost-of-living crisis, anti-social behaviour and crime, access to GPs, welfare benefits and illegal immigration.

== History ==
The Red Wall Caucus was formed in November 2024 to represent the interests of Labour MPs who represent seats in the red wall, a collection of constituencies in the Midlands and Northern England which traditionally voted for Labour until the 2019 general election, when most of these seats switched to the Conservatives over the issue of Brexit. At the 2024 general election, most seats in the red wall returned to Labour, though this was the result of the new right-wing populist party Reform UK splitting the Conservative vote out of protest against high immigration numbers under the former Conservative government rather than the Labour Party improving on its previous performance in 2019, with analysis showing that Labour actually won fewer votes in the red wall than in 2019. The main aims of the caucus are to put pressure on the Labour leadership to take a tougher stance on immigration to prevent Reform from winning red wall seats at the next general election, and to give red wall MPs a louder voice to tackle a perceived lack of representation for their constituencies, and post-industrial red wall constituencies in particular, in the government.

Since its founding, the caucus has pursued a constructive approach to the Labour leadership and the government of Labour prime minister Keir Starmer, with the intention of improving Labour's public image with its traditional working class voters. However, it is believed that the group will pursue a more aggressive approach as the next general election nears, in order to address the threat of Reform UK. The group has held meetings with government ministers and senior figures in Starmer's team, including the work and pensions secretary Liz Kendall and Starmer's former chief of strategy Deborah Mattinson, to influence government policy. It has also met with senior party officials to discuss the most effective way to portray Labour's policy positions on issues important to the group such as immigration.

After the poor Labour results in the 2025 local elections it lobbied Prime Minister Keir Starmer to promote policies on border control, tackling anti-social behaviour, slow GP access and the cost-of-living for the working-class. During the 2025 Labour Party deputy leadership election, the caucus hosted a husting of the candidates and endorsed the election of a female candidate from Northern England "who has the ability and capacity to act as a strong voice for our areas".

== Policies ==
The Red Wall Caucus focuses on issues which it identifies as affecting working class communities in particular, the traditional voter base of the Labour Party. Alongside immigration, these issues include the cost-of-living crisis, improving access to NHS GPs, tackling anti-social behaviour and crime and getting people off welfare benefits. It has also called for more government investment in areas of the red wall and those areas in the North and the Midlands which they identify as "left behind" in particular. To this end, the caucus has called for the government to stop using The Green Book, a document used by HM Treasury to evaluate the costs and benefits of new infrastructure projects, which it believes overexaggerates costs and downplays benefits.

In April 2025, the Red Wall Caucus co-signed an open letter with the Blue Labour and Labour Growth Group parliamentary caucuses calling for the Labour government of Keir Starmer to introduce digital ID cards to tackle immigration, ensuring "we know exactly who is here", as well as unreported employment, benefit fraud and the black market, and also to better integrate people with public services such as the NHS.

== Members ==
The Red Wall Caucus is a parliamentary caucus and pressure group of backbench Labour MPs in the Parliamentary Labour Party. Members sit on the backbenches of the House of Commons and represent constituencies in the red wall, covering the Midlands and Northern England.

Following its launch in November 2024, the Red Wall Caucus was reported by PoliticsHome to have had "around a couple of dozen people within the Parliamentary Labour Party". In December 2024, The Daily Telegraph reported that the group had 35 MPs as members. As of May 2025, the caucus has 43 members.

== Reception ==
Ideologically progressive Labour politicians have opposed the Red Wall Caucus's focus on opposing immigration and fighting Reform. These politicians believe that doing so would alienate Labour's metropolitan voter base in cities like London to the benefit of the left-wing Green Party of England and Wales and independent politicians, who are believed to pose a greater challenge to Labour than Reform UK.

With the formation of the group, the Labour leadership has directed more of its attention on addressing the potential threat of Reform UK. Former Labour leader and prime minister Keir Starmer criticised high immigration rates under previous Conservative governments as an "open border experiment", as part of a shift toward focusing on tackling immigration. The Starmerite thinktank Labour Together and its chief executive Jonathan Ashworth worked with the group to promote the work of Starmer's government on immigration and fight Reform UK. According to Michael Gove, the editor of The Spectator, the group had the support of Starmer's chief of staff Morgan McSweeney.

Harriet Harman, who served as the acting leader of the Labour Party in 2010 and 2015 and as mother of the House from 2008 to 2024, said the formation of the caucus was "problematic" because it made it seem like members of the caucus did not believe the Labour leadership were working effectively on the issues it campaigned on. She also said she was worried that its formation would lead to increased factionalism in the Labour Party and Starmer's Labour government, which she compared to the disruptive five families of the Conservative Party under Rishi Sunak. While she maintained that she supported groups of Labour MPs for specific communities of MPs like women or for specific locations like coastal towns or London, she also said "we don't want" regionalism or factionalism, and called on members of the Red Wall Caucus to "support the government" and "play their part in the Parliamentary Labour Party" without "set[ting] up all these flipping groups".

== See also ==
- New Conservatives
