= Conservative Mainstream =

UK pressure group

Conservative Mainstream is a pressure group on the left of the British Conservative Party, advocating centrist views.

It was founded in 1996. It is now aligned closely to the Tory Reform Group and the Conservative Europe Group. Its chairman is Damian Green MP.
