= Conservative Friends of Turkey =

UK political group

Conservative Friends of Turkey (CFT) is a group associated with the British Conservative Party. Its fundamental objective is given as promoting links between Turkey and the Conservative Party at all levels, by working with local and national party organisations, business groups and academia. Other aims include fostering enhanced bilateral trade relationships and increasing awareness of the Conservative Party within the Turkish-speaking communities in the UK. The group also lobbies in favour of Turkish membership of the EU and highlights Turkey's importance as an ally of the UK. CFT lists the following activities to achieve these aims: by providing information on Turkey through regular briefings and newsletters; by organising meetings and events in Britain, Turkey and Belgium; and by arranging British parliamentary delegations to Turkey.

== Membership ==
CFT counts 21 MPs, 4 peers and 2 MEPs among its founders Founder Members - Conservative Friends of Turkey.

The three original founding members of the organisation were Councillor Ertan Hurer and Dr Onur Cetin, both of Turkish ancestry living in the UK and Dr Riza Kadilar.

== Activities ==
Recent CFT activities include: the official launch with Foreign Secretary Rt Hon William Hague MP, launch of the Brussels branch with Daniel Hannan MEP and Geoffrey Van Orden OBE MEP, a joint dinner with Cities of London and Westminster Conservative Association and a joint reception with Westminster North Conservative Association hosting Defence Secretary Rt Hon Dr Liam Fox MP.

Following the UK referendum on EU membership the CFT has been active in lobbying the Conservative Government to foster a closer relationship with Turkey and held a fringe meeting at the 2016 Party Conference titled "Turkey and the EU, building bridges post Brexit".

The CFT takes great care not to criticise Turkey. It has made no comment on Turkish actions in Syria, Libya, Kurdistan and its provocations against Greece and Cyprus. CFT Cofounder Daniel Hannan tweeted that he was happier to see Aghia Sophia in Istanbul used as a mosque than as a museum.

== Newsletter ==
CFT started publishing a monthly newsletter in early 2009, an archive of past newsletters can be found on the official website Conservative Friends of Turkey.

== See also ==
- List of organisations associated with the Conservative Party (UK)
