= New Conservatives (UK) =

Parliamentary group in the United Kingdom

- President: John Hayes
- Chairpersons: Danny Kruger; Miriam Cates
- Founded: 21 May 2023; 3 years ago
- Dissolved: 4 July 2024; 2 years ago (inactive since election)
- Ideology: National conservatism Social conservatism Euroscepticism
- Political position: Right-wing
- National affiliation: Conservative Party
- Colours: Blue

Website
- www.thenewconservatives.co.uk

The New Conservatives were a parliamentary group of predominantly red wall Conservative MPs created in May 2023, who aimed to shape the Conservative Party's policies ahead of the 2024 United Kingdom general election. Politico described the group as having 25 members in July 2023. All but three members lost their seats in the election, and the group has been inactive since the election.

== History ==
The group was created on Sunday, 21 May 2023, and has no official leader, although the co-founders, the former Penistone and Stocksbridge MP Miriam Cates and the former Devizes MP Danny Kruger are the chairs behind the initiative.

In October 2023, the group proposed banning "gender ideology" within state schools as one of their platforms.

In November 2023, it was reported by Sky News that the group had met to discuss Suella Braverman potentially "making a play" for a Conservative party leadership.

== Policies ==
The group described itself as wishing to return to the Conservative Party's 2019 manifesto by cutting immigration to below 226,000, as well as focusing on law and order and to tackle perceived bias in education.

=== 10-point policy ===
The New Conservatives' primary goals are listed in their 10-point plan, which consists of the following:

1. Closing temporary schemes that grant work visa eligibility for care workers and senior care workers.
2. Raising the minimum income required to gain a skilled work visa.
3. Extending the closure of the student dependant route.
4. Closing the graduate route to students.
5. Reserving university Study Visas for the brightest international students.
6. Monitoring the reduction in visa applications under the humanitarian schemes.
7. Implementing the provisions of the Illegal Migration Bill rapidly.
8. Capping the number of refugees legally accepted for resettlement in the UK.
9. Raising the minimum combined income threshold for sponsoring a spouse and raising the minimum language requirement.
10. Capping the amount of social housing that councils may assign to non-UK nationals.

== Membership ==
Parliament	Composition
2024 (at dissolution)	24 / 345

Prior to the general election, the group was made up of 24 Conservative MPs; only three members retained their seats.

Unless otherwise mentioned, all members in this table were first elected to parliament in 2019 and defeated in their bid for reelection in 2024.

MP	Constituency	Notes
Miriam Cates	Penistone and Stocksbridge	Founding member
Danny Kruger	Devizes	Founding member. Reelected in 2024 for successor constituency East Wiltshire; defected to Reform UK in 2025.
Jonathan Gullis	Stoke-on-Trent North	Conservative party deputy chairman. Subsequently joined Reform UK in 2025
Alexander Stafford	Rother Valley	
Nick Fletcher	Don Valley	
Sarah Atherton	Wrexham	Subsequently joined Reform UK in 2025
Tom Hunt	Ipswich	Subsequently joined Reform UK in 2025
Gareth Bacon	Orpington	Reelected in 2024.
Duncan Baker	North Norfolk	
Paul Bristow	Peterborough	
Brendan Clarke-Smith	Bassetlaw	
James Daly	Bury North	
Anna Firth	Southend West	First elected in 2022
Chris Green	Bolton West	First elected in 2015. Subsequently joined Reform UK in 2025
Eddie Hughes	Walsall North	First elected in 2017
Mark Jenkinson	Workington	
Andrew Lewer	Northampton South	First elected in 2017
Marco Longhi	Dudley North	Subsequently joined Reform UK in 2025
Robin Millar	Aberconwy	
Lia Nici	Great Grimsby	Subsequently joined Reform UK in 2025
John Hayes	South Holland and The Deepings	President of group, elected 1997. Reelected in 2024.
Lee Anderson	Ashfield	Defected to Reform UK in March 2024 and reelected for Reform in 2024

== See also ==
- Common Sense Group
- Red Wall Caucus
