= Common Sense Group =

British Conservative Party faction

- Formation: 2020
- President: Edward Leigh
- Chairman: John Hayes
- Vice Chairman: Tom Hunt
- Parent organisation: Conservative Party

The Common Sense Group is an informal group of MPs in the British Conservative Party. The Guardian described it as a hard-right group that was sympathetic to culture wars. It was created in 2020, inspired by the European Research Group, a Eurosceptic Conservative faction. In 2021, it published a manifesto, Common Sense: Conservative Thinking for a Post-Liberal Age.

== History ==
The Common Sense Group was created in mid-2020. By November, it included 59 MPs and seven members of the House of Lords. Its president is Sir Edward Leigh, MP.

Following an interim report on the connections between colonialism and properties now in the care of the National Trust, including links with historic slavery, members of the group signed a letter to The Telegraph in November 2020. The letter accused the National Trust of being "coloured by cultural Marxist dogma, colloquially known as the woke agenda".

The group's manifesto, Common Sense: Conservative Thinking for a Post-Liberal Age, was published in May 2021. John Hayes MP wrote in the Preface, "With opportunities provided by Brexit, the time for a refreshed national conversation on the defining issues of our time – nationhood, community, migration, the rule of law and public order – is now."

== Members ==
At their peak in November 2020, the Common Sense Group included the following members, listed by the positions they held at the time:

Conservative MPs

- Gareth Bacon (MP for Orpington since 2019)
- Bob Blackman (MP for Harrow East since 2010)
- Fiona Bruce (MP for Congleton 2010-2024)
- David Burrowes (MP for Enfield Southgate 2005-2017)
- Brendan Clarke-Smith (MP for Bassetlaw 2019-2024)
- Philip Davies (MP for Shipley 2005-2024)
- Nick Fletcher (MP for Don Valley 2019-2024)
- Sally-Ann Hart (MP for Hastings and Rye 2019-2024)
- John Hayes (MP for South Holland and the Deepings since 1997)
- Tom Hunt (MP for Ipswich 2019-2024)
- Pauline Latham (MP for Mid Derbyshire 2010-2024)
- Sir Edward Leigh (MP for Gainsborough since 1983)
- Andrew Lewer (MP for Northampton South 2017–2024)
- Chris Loder
- Craig Mackinlay (MP for South Thanet 2015–2024)
- Karl McCartney (MP for Lincoln 2010-2017, 2019–2024)
- Robin Millar (MP for Aberconwy 2019–2024)
- David Morris (MP for Morecambe and Lunesdale 2010–2024)
- Joy Morrissey (MP for Beaconsfield since 2019)
- Alexander Stafford (MP for Rother Valley 2019–2024)
- James Sunderland
- Martin Vickers
- Giles Watling (MP for Clacton 2015–2024)
- William Wragg (MP for Hazel Grove 2015–2024; resigned the Conservative Party whip April 2024)

Members of the House of Lords:

- Baroness Eaton
- Lord Horam of Grimsargh
- Lord Hodgson of Astley Abbotts
- Lord Lilley

Others:

- Michael Nazir-Ali (former Anglican Bishop)
- David Maddox (journalist)

Lee Anderson, Danny Kruger, Andrew Rosindell, Ben Bradley, Jonathan Gullis and Marco Longhi were formerly members of the group, prior to their defection to Reform UK.

== See also ==
- Social class in the United Kingdom
- Blue Collar Conservativism
- New Conservatives (UK)
