= Andrew Haldenby =

Andrew Haldenby was a co-founder of the think tank Reform (in 2001, with Nick Herbert) and was its Director between 2005 and 2019. He was a trustee of the sister organisation of Reform, Reform Scotland, until 2012. He was previously Communications Director at Business for Sterling (2000–2001), and Director of Studies at the Centre for Policy Studies (1998–1999). Before that he worked in the Conservative Research Department (1995–1997), ultimately as Head of the Political Section.

Haldenby studied history at Corpus Christi College, Cambridge (1990–1993). He is the author of a chapter in The Future of the NHS edited by Dr Michelle Tempest.
