= Conservative Friends of the Chinese =

UK political organisation

The Conservative Friends of the Chinese is a membership organisation that engages with the British Chinese community on UK - China relations. It is linked to the Conservative Party in the UK and campaigns for the party in the British Chinese community.

The group was launched by Boris Johnson in May 2013 to an audience of 200 from the community, followed by an event at No. 11 Downing Street with Chancellor George Osborne. Since its formation, the group has organised events by UK Cabinet Ministers to engage the British Chinese community.

== Patron ==
- The Rt. Hon. Jeremy Hunt MP

=== Chairs ===
- Geoffrey Clifton-Brown MP (Parliamentary Chairman)

=== Notable members ===
- Lord Michael Dobbs, the author of House of Cards, is a board member of the group, as is Michael Bates, Baron Bates, whose wife is Chinese.
- Lord Nat Wei, Baron Wei, was formerly the chairman of the group. He is a social entrepreneur and advisor on technology. With origins in Hong Kong, he is the first British Chinese to serve in the House of Lords.
- Alan Mak, the Conservative MP for Havant. He, however, has been quoted in the media saying 'he cares little for his ethnic identity, preferring to focus more on the "bigger and more important" issues. He also stated that: "And I certainly have no interest in what people in Hong Kong or China think of me because I am not representing them. I am representing the people of Havant ... '.
- Jackson Ng, a former Political Director of the group, is a Barrister and a political advisor in the House of Lords who was the Conservative Party's Parliamentary Candidate for Liverpool Riverside in the May 2015 British General Election and St Helens North for the June 2017 General Election.

== Sub-groups and sister organizations ==
The Conservative Friends of the Chinese work closely with other affiliated groups of the Conservative Party, which are listed below.

- Conservative Parliamentary China Group
- Conservative Friends of the Chinese (London) - Chinese Conservative Group, Mark Field
- The Shanghai Blue Club - Conservatives Abroad
- The Beijing Blue Club - Conservatives Abroad
