= Jo White =

British politician (born 1964)

Jo White MP
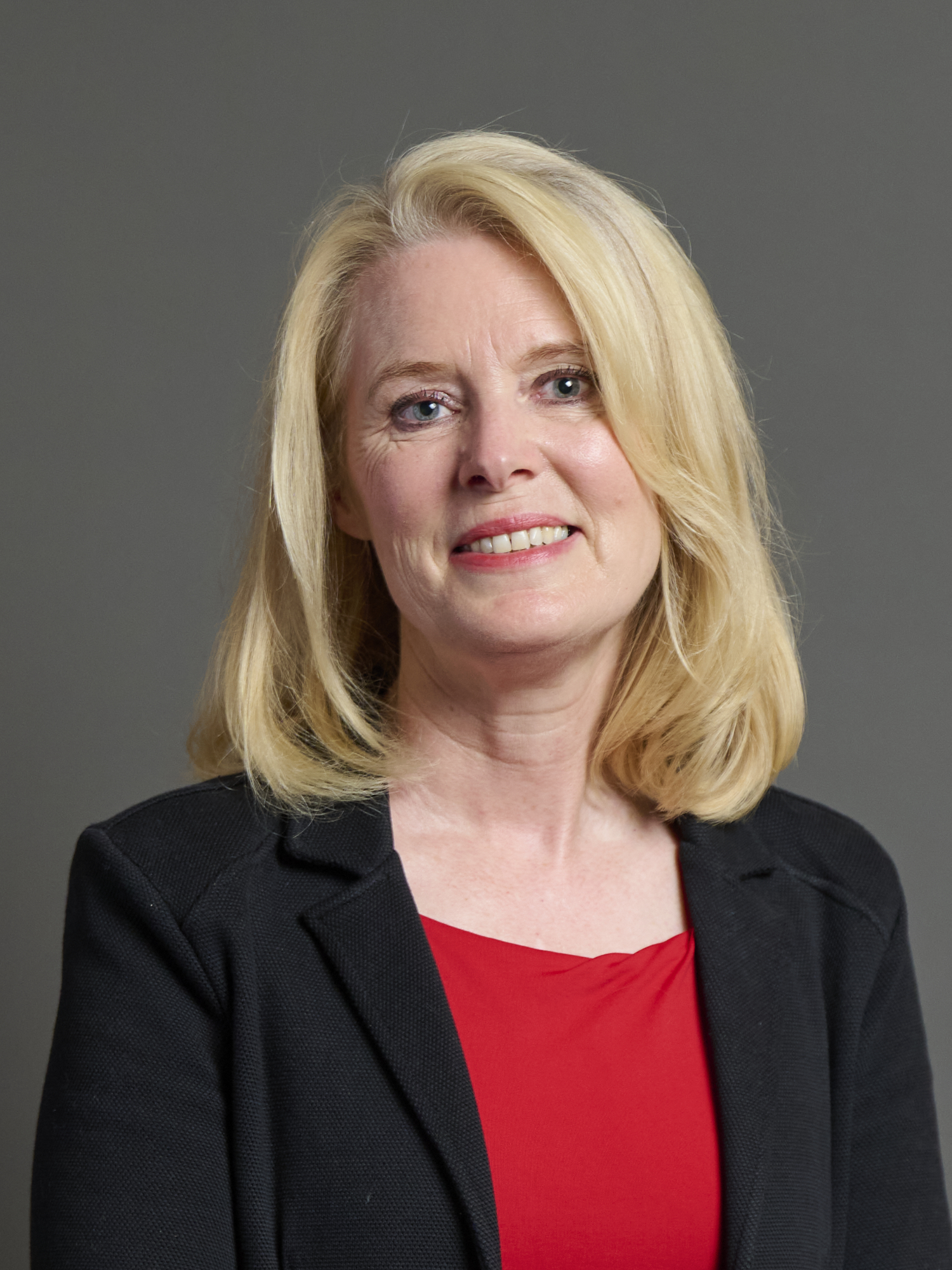
- Official portrait, 2024

Parliamentary Under-Secretary of State for Migration and Citizenship
- Incumbent
- Assumed office 22 July 2026
- Prime Minister: Andy Burnham
- Preceded by: Mike Tapp

Member of Parliament for Bassetlaw
- Incumbent
- Assumed office 4 July 2024
- Preceded by: Brendan Clarke-Smith
- Majority: 5,768 (12.9%)

Member of Bassetlaw District Council for Worksop East
- In office 3 May 2012 – 15 September 2026
- Preceded by: John Scott
- Succeeded by: Nancy Wright

Personal details
- Born: Joanna Ruth White; 22 January 1964 (age 62) Stamford, Lincolnshire, England
- Party: Labour
- Other political affiliations: Labour Friends of Israel; Red Wall Caucus
- Spouse: John Mann, Baron Mann (m. 1986)
- Education: University of Manchester
- Website: https://www.jowhite.uk/

Joanna Ruth White (born 22 January 1964) is a British Labour Party politician serving as Member of Parliament (MP) for Bassetlaw since 2024.

White is chair of the Red Wall Caucus of red wall Labour MPs in Parliament. A local ward councillor for 14 years, in 2026 she was advised to resign to avoid any potential conflict of interest.

== Early life and education ==
White was born in 1964 in Stamford, Lincolnshire. She has an identical twin, Deb Davies, who was elected as a Labour councillor in Newport, Wales in 2012. In 2022, she stated she had recently discovered their partly Jewish ancestry.

White studied at the University of Manchester, where she was General Secretary of the Students' Union.

== Political career ==
White was office manager for her husband John Mann, the Bassetlaw MP from 2003 to 2019. She served as chair of the Bassetlaw Constituency Labour Party. She was a member of Unite the Union's executive for over a decade.

White was first elected as a ward-member of Bassetlaw District Council representing Worksop East in 2012. She was appointed as the executive member for regeneration in 2013 and became Deputy Leader in 2015. As a sitting MP, White was advised to resign from involvement in local politics to avoid any potential conflict of interest. At the subsequent by-election, a Reform UK candidate was successful.

White was elected as MP for Bassetlaw at the 2024 general election, defeating incumbent Conservative Brendan Clarke-Smith.

In 2024, White founded a red wall group of about 35 backbench Labour MPs, sometimes called the Red Wall Caucus, of which she is chair. The group has had meetings with ministers, and following the poor Labour results in the 2025 local elections it lobbied Prime Minister Keir Starmer to promote policies on border control, tackling anti-social behaviour, slow GP access and the cost-of-living for the working-class.

White is a Vice-Chair of Labour Friends of Israel.

== Political positions ==
In May 2025, White publicly urged Keir Starmer to "stop pussy-footing around" and called on him to announce measures including "a national inquiry into grooming gangs, a crackdown on immigration and investment in left-behind industrial heartlands." At the same time, White criticised the decision to restrict the Winter Fuel Payment to pensioners receiving means-tested benefits, likening the policy to the poll tax. In 2026, she criticised the appointment of Peter Mandelson.

In January 2026, White warned against a “London stitch-up” in Labour’s selection process for the Gorton and Denton by-election, saying that party members should decide the party’s candidate, amid speculation that Andy Burnham could be blocked from standing. Burnham was later barred from seeking the Labour nomination by the party’s National Executive Committee. Following the 2026 Makerfield by-election, White called on Keir Starmer to resign and supported Burnham as his successor.

=== Health ===
White supports action on period healthcare.

=== Welfare ===
White supported cuts to several benefits including Universal Credit and changes to the eligibility criteria for the Personal Independence Payment (PIP) announced in the March 2025 United Kingdom spring statement. While endorsing the reforms, White emphasised that "the system must protect the most vulnerable", but argued that parts of the welfare system encouraged "the feckless [and] squeezing out the needy". White also suggested that some families had "adapt[ed] to a lifestyle of living on benefits".

=== Immigration ===
White has described illegal immigration as "The key issue in my constituency" and called for the introduction of mandatory identity cards to "reassure voters that illegal immigrants won't get a job or healthcare without one." In August 2025, White called upon the government to "act to shut asylum hotels sooner", stating: "We need to make it far more difficult for asylum seekers to want to come to this country."

== Personal life ==
White married John Mann, Baron Mann in 1986, with whom she has three children. A former Labour member was convicted of harassment against White, including mailing her a dead bird in 2012.

In 2026, White revealed that she had endometriosis, and had only received a diagnosis after 30 years, and called for rapid diagnosis and treatment of endometriosis in the NHS.

Parliament of the United Kingdom
Preceded by Brendan Clarke-Smith	Member of Parliament for Bassetlaw; 2024–present	Incumbent
