= European Research Group =

Eurosceptic faction within UK Conservative Party

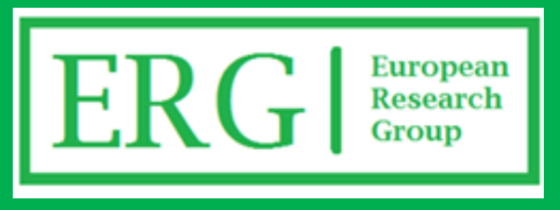
- Abbreviation: ERG
- Formation: July 1993; 33 years ago
- Founder: Michael Spicer
- Legal status: IPSA-funded pooled service
- Purpose: Support research for Eurosceptic UK Conservative MPs who choose to subscribe
- Chairman: Mark Francois
- Deputy Chairman: Vacant
- Deputy Chairwoman: Vacant
- Parent organisation: Conservative Party

The European Research Group (ERG) is a research support group and caucus of Eurosceptic Conservative Members of Parliament of the United Kingdom. In a Financial Times article in 2020, the journalist Sebastian Payne described the ERG as "the most influential [research group] in recent political history".

In 2018, the group served an annual average of 21 MPs including cabinet members, the group's focus is the single issue of the UK's withdrawal from the European Union. Since the 2024 general election, the membership has been severely reduced.

== History ==
=== Origins and Pre-EU referendum, 1993–2016 ===
In July 1993 Sir Michael Spicer, the then MP for West Worcestershire, created the European Research Group in response to growing concerns about Britain's continued integration into the European Economic Community through the Maastricht Treaty. The Eurosceptic group, which was chaired by Spicer, aimed to promote coordination of right-of-centre opposition across Europe and worked alongside other anti-EU groups such as UKIP and the Referendum Party. Support for the group was boosted in 1995 after it published an anti-federalist pamphlet discussing Euroscepticism which included a foreword by Prime Minister John Major.

Contributors to the research output of the ERG have included Daniel Hannan and Mark Reckless who wrote a paper 'The Euro: bad for business' and Hannan acted as the ERG's first secretary in 1993 according to The Guardian.

An unexpected consequence of the creation of the Independent Parliamentary Standards Authority (IPSA), under the Parliamentary Standards Act 2009 and in response to the parliamentary expenses scandal of 2009, was the formation of a sustainable revenue stream for the ERG through the formal mechanism of IPSA's administration of MP's subscriptions to pooled services. This created an opportunity for the ERG, an unincorporated association with no obligation to publish accounts, to fund researchers and establish a social media communications network at taxpayer's expense.

Senior researchers have included Robert Broadhurst, Conservative Parliamentary Researcher of the Year 2010 in the Dods Parliamentary researcher awards, and Christopher Howarth, formerly of Open Europe, who succeeded Broadhurst. In November 2016, Howarth represented the ERG at the parliamentary researchers' and academics' conference on Brexit He is a regular contributor to ConservativeHome and City A.M.. Howarth stood for the Conservative Party in the 2019 General Election in Houghton and Sunderland South losing to Bridget Phillipson by 3,115 votes.

In the period leading up to the EU referendum ten members of ERG acted in an official capacity for Vote Leave:

- Michael Gove
- Iain Duncan Smith
- Liam Fox
- Chris Grayling
- Priti Patel
- John Whittingdale
- Anne-Marie Trevelyan
- Bernard Jenkin
- Steve Baker
- Douglas Carswell

=== Since the Brexit referendum ===
Following the result of the Brexit referendum in 2016 Chris Heaton-Harris MP resigned as ERG's chair and the new chair Steve Baker and deputy chair Michael Tomlinson announced a relaunch of the ERG, calling for the government to withdraw from the European Economic Area (EEA) and the European Union Customs Union. Baker was subsequently promoted to Parliamentary Under-Secretary of State for Exiting the European Union and in May 2017 Suella Braverman replaced him as the group's chair. In January 2018, Braverman was also promoted to the Department for Exiting the European Union as Parliamentary Under-Secretary of State making way for Jacob Rees-Mogg to be elected.

On 11 September 2018, members of the ERG reportedly met in Westminster to discuss plans to bring down the then prime minister, Theresa May.

On 4 February 2018, columnist Peter Wilby was critical, writing that "The highly secretive body seems to devote most of its efforts to what, if it were left-wing, would be called plotting." In the same article, he quotes The Times as saying it is "the most aggressive and successful political cadre in Britain today".

On 15 February 2019, the Press Association reported that "Critics, however, accuse it of acting as a "party within a party", running its own whipping operation in support of its objective of a so-called "hard" Brexit, if necessary leaving without any deal with Brussels."

On 26 July 2018, the German public international broadcaster Deutsche Welle reported that "The European Research Group is a lobbying entity pushing for a no-nonsense, hard Brexit. Some say it is essentially running the show, not the British government." and "In February 2017, the group sent a letter to May setting out their hard-line Brexit demands: Britain should not only leave the EU but also the single market and customs union. That prompted Conservative MP Nicky Morgan, who voted remain, to accuse the ERG of holding Theresa May to ransom. Her then colleague Anna Soubry said that Jacob Rees-Mogg was "running our country. Theresa May is no longer in charge."

On 11 March 2019, the Constitution Unit in the Department of Political Science at University College London reported in Monitor 71 that "The Conservatives have their own party-within-a-party, in the strongly pro-Brexit European Research Group. After many false starts, it forced a vote of no confidence in Theresa May's leadership of the party in December, which she won by 200 votes to 117."

Many new Conservative MPs elected in the 2019 general election joined the group.

=== In Government ===
On 6 September 2022 Liz Truss succeeded Boris Johnson as Prime Minister and appointed known ERG subscribers to nine senior Cabinet positions including two of the Great Offices of State in her new government:

- Thérèse Coffey was appointed Deputy Prime Minister and Secretary of State for Health and Social Care.
- Suella Braverman was appointed Home Secretary resigning after 6 weeks, following a ministerial breach of security protocol.
- James Cleverly was appointed Foreign Secretary.
- Brandon Lewis was appointed Secretary of State for Justice and Lord Chancellor.
- Penny Mordaunt was appointed Leader of the House of Commons and Lord President of the Council.
- Jacob Rees-Mogg was appointed Secretary of State for Business, Energy and Industrial Strategy.
- Kit Malthouse was appointed Secretary of State for Education.
- Anne-Marie Trevelyan was appointed Secretary of State for Transport.
- Chris Heaton-Harris was appointed Secretary of State for Northern Ireland.

On 25 October 2022 Rishi Sunak succeeded Liz Truss as Prime Minister without ERG endorsement but appointed ERG members to seven senior Cabinet positions:

- James Cleverly was reappointed Foreign Secretary.
- Suella Braverman was appointed Home Secretary.
- Penny Mordaunt was reappointed Leader of the House of Commons and Lord President of the Council.
- Michael Gove was appointed Secretary of State for Levelling Up, Housing and Communities.
- Thérèse Coffey was appointed Secretary of State for Environment, Food and Rural Affairs.
- Anne-Marie Trevelyan was appointed Minister of State for Indo-Pacific.
- Chris Heaton-Harris was reappointed Secretary of State for Northern Ireland.

== Structure ==
=== Chair ===
- Sir Michael Spicer (1994–2001)
- David Heathcoat-Amory (2001–2010)
- Chris Heaton-Harris (2010–2016)
- Steve Baker (2016–2017)
- Suella Braverman (2017–2018)
- Jacob Rees-Mogg (2018–2019)
- Steve Baker (2019–2020)
- Mark Francois (2020–present)

=== Deputy Chair ===
- Suella Braverman (2016–2017)
- Michael Tomlinson (2016–2018)
- Mark Francois (2018–2020)
- Steve Baker (2018–2019)
- Andrea Jenkyns (2019–2024)
- David Jones (2020–2024)

== Subscribers ==
Subscribers to the pooled service provided by the European Research Group can be identified on the Independent Parliamentary Standards Authority records of Parliamentary expenses. As an unincorporated association the group does not publish membership details or annual accounts. Various media reports speculate that a wider membership exists and on 1 May 2019, following a ruling by the Information Commissioner's Office that the Department for Exiting the European Union must reveal the existence of an email to the group from Steve Baker, openDemocracy published a report on a wider membership.

- Suella Braverman
- Christopher Chope
- James Cleverly
- David Davis
- Iain Duncan Smith
- Mark Francois
- Bernard Jenkin
- Kit Malthouse
- Alec Shelbrooke
- Martin Vickers
- John Whittingdale
- Mike Wood

=== Past subscribers ===
- Daniel Kawczynski resigned from the ERG on 8 April 2019, stating: "I can no longer be a member of a caucus which is preventing WA4 [a fourth vote on the Brexit withdrawal agreement] from passing."
- David Gauke
- Chris Pincher
- Natalie Elphicke
- Bim Afolami
- Steve Baker
- Therese Coffey
- Robert Courts
- Jonathan Djanogly
- Jackie Doyle-Price
- James Duddridge
- Michael Fabricant
- Liam Fox
- Michael Gove
- Chris Grayling
- Jonathan Gullis
- Chris Heaton-Harris
- Sajid Javid
- Eleanor Laing
- Pauline Latham
- Andrea Leadsom
- Brandon Lewis
- Craig Mackinlay
- Stephen McPartland
- Nigel Mills
- Penny Mordaunt
- James Morris
- John Penrose
- Jacob Rees-Mogg
- Mark Simmonds
- Henry Smith
- Michael Tomlinson
- Bill Wiggin

== Funding ==
ERG subscriptions are taxpayer-funded through Independent Parliamentary Standards Authority (IPSA)-funded pooled service within the formal IPSA Scheme of MPs' Business Costs and Expenses and is one of two such publicly funded pooled services maintained for Conservative MPs.

The ERG has drawn criticism for its lack of transparency regarding its use of public funds to carry out research. A 2017 report by openDemocracy found that more than a quarter of a million pounds had been claimed through MPs' official expenses since 2010, after which Labour MPs called for an inquiry to be carried out by the IPSA into the group's practices. OpenDemocracy's September 2017 report commenced:

Taxpayers' money is being used to fund an influential group of hard-line pro-Brexit Conservative MPs who are increasingly operating as a "party-within-a-party".

According to a 2017 article in The Observer, the ERG has also been funded by a secretive group called the Constitutional Research Council.

In July 2019 a tribunal ruled that the ERG's research must be made public.

== See also ==
- 55 Tufton Street – a building in Westminster which hosts a network of libertarian lobby groups and think tanks related to pro-Brexit, climate science debate, tax controls, education and other lobby groups.
- Blue Collar Conservativism – a Brexit supporting pressure group of Conservative MPs, relaunched in May 2019.
- Bruges Group – an independent Eurosceptic think tank.
- Common Sense Group – inspired by the ERG.
- Conservative Way Forward – a Eurosceptic, Thatcherite pressure group.
- Institute of Economic Affairs – a right wing think tank.
- Leave Means Leave – a campaign group which many ERG members were involved in.
- Maastricht Rebels – a group of Conservative MPs that voted against their leader John Major in opposition to the Maastricht Treaty.
- Monday Club – a Conservative aligned pressure group.
- TaxPayers' Alliance – a libertarian Conservative think tank founded by Matthew Elliott, chief executive of Vote Leave.
- Vote Leave – a designated campaign organisation whose campaign director was political strategist Dominic Cummings.
