= Conservative Growth Group =

Faction within the British Conservative Party

The Conservative Growth Group is a faction within the British Conservative Party that backs the former Prime Minister Liz Truss. The growth advocates economic growth through a smaller state and less taxation. The group reportedly has approximately 20 members, including Liz Truss.
