= Brendan Clarke-Smith =

British Conservative politician (born 1980)

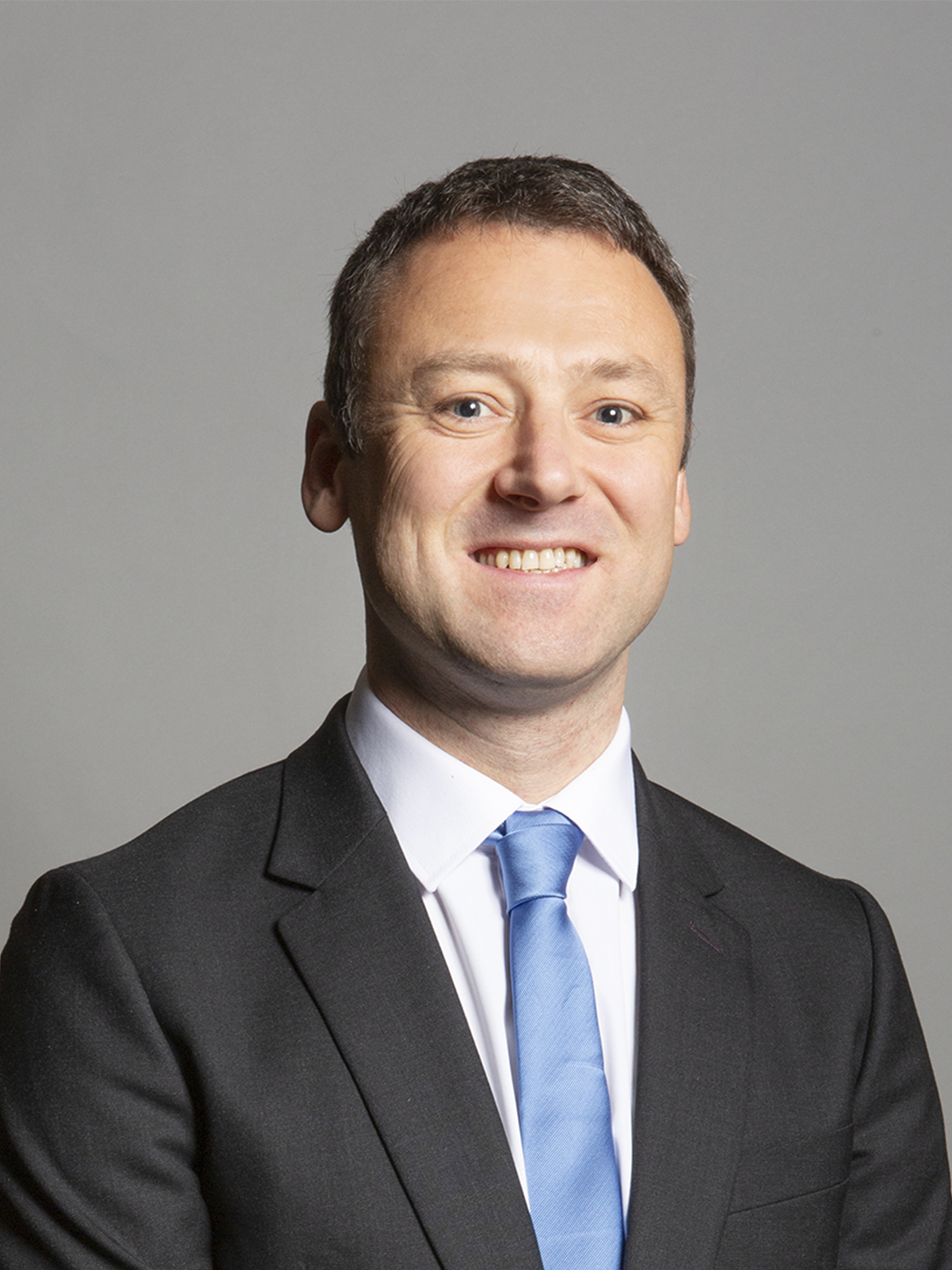
- Official portrait, 2019

Parliamentary Secretary for the Cabinet Office
- In office 8 September 2022 – 27 October 2022
- Prime Minister: Liz Truss
- Preceded by: Heather Wheeler
- Succeeded by: Alex Burghart

Parliamentary Under-Secretary of State for Children and Families
- In office 8 July 2022 – 7 September 2022
- Prime Minister: Boris Johnson
- Preceded by: Will Quince
- Succeeded by: Kelly Tolhurst

Member of Parliament for Bassetlaw
- In office 12 December 2019 – 30 May 2024
- Preceded by: John Mann
- Succeeded by: Jo White

Personal details
- Born: 17 August 1980 (age 46) Clifton, Nottingham, England
- Party: Conservative
- Education: Nottingham Trent University
- Occupation: Politician

Brendan Clarke-Smith (born 17 August 1980) is a British former politician and teacher. A member of the Conservative Party, he served as the Member of Parliament (MP) for Bassetlaw from 2019 to 2024.

Clarke-Smith served under Rishi Sunak as a deputy chairman of the Conservative Party from November 2023 to January 2024, under Liz Truss as Parliamentary Secretary for the Cabinet Office from September and October 2022, and under Boris Johnson as Parliamentary Private Secretary to the Minister without Portfolio and Minister of State from February 2022 to July 2022, and as Parliamentary Under-Secretary of State for Children and Families from July to September 2022. He currently sits on the advisory board of Great British PAC, a campaign group.

== Early life and career ==
Clarke-Smith was born in Clifton, Nottingham, in 1980. He grew up on Clifton Grove, next to the Clifton council estate in Nottingham. He went to secondary school in East Leake, and was the first member of his family to go to university, studying politics at Nottingham Trent University and later gaining a PGCE in religious education. Clarke-Smith earned his MSc in European Studies at the University of Gothenburg in Sweden. He became a teacher at an international school in Romania.

== Early political career ==
Clarke-Smith first stood as a Conservative Party candidate in 2003 when he was elected as a councillor for the Clifton North ward of Nottingham City Council. He was re-elected to this position in 2007 and subsequently contested the neighbouring Clifton South Ward in 2011 but failed to be elected by a margin of 676 votes. He stood as one of the Conservative Party candidates for the European Parliament elections in 2014 and 2019 in the East Midlands region but was not elected. Clarke-Smith campaigned to leave the EU in the 2016 EU referendum and was a member of the Vote Leave campaign. In May 2019, Clarke-Smith overturned a Labour majority in Boughton and Walesby to be elected as a councillor on Newark & Sherwood District Council.

== Parliamentary career ==
Clarke-Smith was elected as the Conservative Party MP for Bassetlaw in the 2019 general election when the sitting MP John Mann stood down. He overturned a 4,852 Labour majority to a 14,013 Conservative majority, the biggest swing that election. This was the first time Bassetlaw had been represented by a party other than Labour since Malcolm MacDonald won the seat in 1929. When elected, Clarke-Smith said his three main priorities were getting Brexit done, improving Bassetlaw Hospital and attracting more money for Retford and Worksop town centres. He also became the chair of the British–Finnish all-party parliamentary group. In December 2019, Clarke-Smith became one of the members of the eurosceptic European Research Group. In March 2020, Clarke-Smith was appointed to the International Development Committee in Parliament.

Clarke-Smith has received media attention for his views on food banks and public provision of free school meals for children from more economically deprived families. He has described food banks as a "political weapon", saying it is "simply not true" that "people can't afford to buy food on a regular basis" and "If you keep saying to people that you're going to give stuff away, then you're going to have an increase I'm afraid." In October 2020, he opposed a Labour Party opposition day motion to extend free school meals over holidays until Easter 2021. Campaigning on the issue of free school meals was led by the footballer Marcus Rashford. Clarke-Smith said: "We need to get back to the idea of taking responsibility. This means less celebrity virtue signalling on Twitter by proxy and more action to tackle the real causes of child poverty."

Following an interim report on the connections between colonialism and properties now in the care of the National Trust, including links with historic slavery, Clarke-Smith was among the signatories of a letter to The Telegraph in November 2020 from the "Common Sense Group" of Conservative Parliamentarians. The letter accused the National Trust of being "coloured by Cultural Marxist dogma, colloquially known as the 'woke agenda'". He has expressed concern over plans to close the mental health facilities at Bassetlaw Hospital and move provision to Mansfield, campaigned for the Robin Hood train line to be extended to Retford and was a signatory to the successful East Midlands bid to be one of ten Freeports. In June 2021, Clarke-Smith opposed the England football team's intention to take the knee at the forthcoming European championship, saying: "Fans understand [racism] perfectly well – they are just sick and tired of being preached and spoken down to. They are there to watch a football match, not to be lectured on morality." In November 2021, he became an advocate of the Down Syndrome Bill, which received Royal Assent as the Down Syndrome Act 2022, and which legally recognises people with Down syndrome as a specific minority group.

In May 2022, when asked by Channel 4 News presenter Cathy Newman if he was "content to back a law-breaker in office", he replied: "I certainly am. And I think the Prime Minister's done many achievements so far. I think he's still got a long time in office as well." Clarke-Smith later took issue with being quoted on the matter, writing to Cathy Newman on Twitter: "Not sure why your sub-editor is using quotation marks here". On 6 June 2022, after a vote of no confidence in the leadership of Boris Johnson was called, Clarke-Smith announced that he would be supporting the Prime Minister, describing the vote as "one of the most ridiculous acts of self-harm I have witnessed in a long time". The following day, Clarke-Smith was criticised on social media following an appearance on Jeremy Vine, during which he accused people of "using personal tragedies" during the COVID-19 pandemic for "party political agendas".

Brendan Clarke-Smith briefly served as Parliamentary Private Secretary to the Minister without Portfolio and Minister of State from 11 February 2022 to 8 July 2022 and as Parliamentary Under Secretary of State (Minister for Children and Families) at the Department for Education between 8 July and 7 September 2022. In February 2023, Clarke-Smith was part of a delegation of UK Parliamentarians consisting of several MPs and members of the House of Lords who visited Northern Cyprus and met with the Turkish Republic of Northern Cyprus (TRNC) government. Clarke-Smith was one of 10 parliamentarians personally named in a Commons Select Committee of Privileges special report on the “Co-ordinated campaign of interference in the work of the Privileges Committee”, published 28 June 2023. The report detailed how said parliamentarians “took it upon themselves to undermine procedures of the House of Commons” by putting pressure on the Commons Privileges Committee investigation into Boris Johnson. Clark-Smith was appointed Deputy Chairman of the Conservative Party on 28 November 2023. He resigned on 16 January 2024 along with Lee Anderson in order to vote for an amendment on the Safety of Rwanda (Asylum and Immigration) Bill. The amendment, put forward by Bill Cash, would "ensure UK and international law could not be used to prevent or delay a person being removed to Rwanda."

Clarke-Smith lost the Bassetlaw seat to Labour in the 2024 United Kingdom general election.

== Post-parliamentary career ==
Following his defeat the 2024 general election, Clarke-Smith has worked as a freelance Political and Education consultant. He also sits on the advisory board of Great British PAC, which was formed in September 2024 which the self-described aim of 'uniting the right'.

Parliament of the United Kingdom
Preceded by John Mann	Member of Parliament for Bassetlaw; 2019–2024	Succeeded by Jo White
