= No Campaign (UK) =

Eurosceptic campaign in the UK

The 'no' campaign was a Eurosceptic campaign in the United Kingdom beginning in 2000 which was opposed to the UK's adoption of the euro. The campaign was funded by Business for Sterling and New Europe groups and was mothballed in spring 2004 after Chancellor Gordon Brown ruled out UK membership of the euro for the foreseeable future. The campaign was founded by Nick Herbert, who as chief executive of Business for Sterling hired Dominic Cummings as campaign director.

The campaign title was simply "No" while its slogan and explanation was "Europe Yes. Euro No."
