= Conservative Business Relations =

Organ of the UK Conservative Party

Conservative Business Relations is an organ of the UK Conservative Party that organises a variety of networking and policy events for businesses. It has hosted a number of networking events and seminars. Alexandra Robson is the Head of Business Relations.
