= Conservatives at Work =

Organisation within the British Conservative Party

- Abbreviation: CaW
- Location: United Kingdom
- Affiliations: Conservative Party
- Website: www.conservativesatwork.org.uk
- Formerly called: Conservative Trade Unionists

Conservatives at Work (CaW), formerly Conservative Trade Unionists (CTU), is an organisation within the British Conservative Party made up of Conservative-supporting trade unionists. It played an important role in expanding the party's membership and influence, particularly in Britain's industrial regions. By building support within trade unions, the party contributed to the reduction of the power and influence of the left. Targeting the working class became a priority for the party. This was motivated by the idea that revulsion towards Labour's egalitarian goals and redistributive policies would emerge from this group.

The CTU served several purposes. One of these involved being a conduit of communication between the Conservative Party and the workers and unionists. The primary objective was for the group to effectively articulate the party's policies and principles to a working class audience. In this way, both organisations benefited. The workers were able to influence policy-making while the Conservative members, particularly at the parliamentary level, were able to determine which measures would receive support or strong opposition. This was important because CTU held considerable influence on public opinion, especially in the latter part of the 1970s. CTU also influenced unionists on issues such as the right to opt out of paying a political levy.

== Important milestones ==
In the mid-1970s, the CTU president was Norman Tebbit (a former official of the British Airline Pilots' Association). He drafted Thatcher's speech to the CTU Conference in 1975, shortly after she was elected Conservative leader.

Under Margaret Thatcher's leadership, there was a drive for recruitment. In 1975, seven new full-time workers were appointed under a new head, John Bowis. The 1977, CTU annual conference was attended by over 1,200 delegates. By 1978, there were 250 groups whose membership varied from 20 to 200 members.

In the later 1970s and early 1980s, the CTU played an important part in guiding the party toward the Trade Union reforms introduced by James Prior, who was appointed Secretary of State for Employment after Thatcher became Prime Minister in 1979.

Peter Bottomley (a member of the Transport and General Workers' Union) was CTU president from 1978 to 1980. Sir Brian Mawhinney was president from 1987 to 1990.

In the 1990s, with the decline in union influence, CTU membership waned. After the Conservative defeat in the 1997 General Election the organisation was renamed Conservatives at Work.

== See also ==
- Conservative Workers & Trade Unionists
- List of trade unions
