= Catholics in the Conservative Party =

Group within the UK Conservative Party

- President: Sir Julian Brazier
- Chairperson: Alberto Garzoni
- Founder: Sir Julian Brazier
- Founded: 2019
- Ideology: Conservatism (British); Catholicism

Website
- https://catholicconservatives.uk/

Catholics in the Conservative Party (CITCP) is an organisation within the British Conservative Party which promotes the interests of Catholics in the United Kingdom and their participation in public life.

Established in 2019, and originally chaired by Andrew Cusack and Frances Lasok, CITCP has carried out its activities to promote the participation of Catholics within the Conservative Party by organising talks on Catholic social doctrine, canvassing for Catholic candidates during local and national elections, and promoting causes which directly affect the United Kingdom's Catholic population. Like many organisations in the Conservative party, the group also has adopted a number of parliamentary patrons, both in the House of Commons and the House of Lords.

Since its official launch in January 2023, with an event attended by Sir Iain Duncan Smith and Damian Hinds and featuring Sir Jacob Rees-Mogg as a speaker, CITCP organises events for Catholic members, supporters, and voters of the Conservative Party within the United Kingdom, including events within Parliament, alongside groups such as Catholics for Labour and the Catholic Union of Great Britain, prayer breakfasts, and pub talks with politicians such as Lord Greenhalgh, Danny Kruger and Iain Duncan Smith.

Moreover, the group is involved as a stakeholder in discussions over the engagement of Catholic faithful in politics in the UK, in accordance with the multiple exhortations of the Catholic Church in this sense.

The group has been featured regularly with events at the Conservative Party Conference since its foundation, involving Catholic voices prominent in the public scene and members of the clergy

== Organisation ==
The current (2024) President of Catholics in the Conservative Party is Sir Julian Brazier, former Conservative Member of Parliament for Canterbury.

In 2024, Alberto Garzoni was elected Chair of Catholics in the Conservative Party for one year.

== Patrons ==
- Lord Balfe
- Rt Hon Sir Iain Duncan Smith MP
- Rt Hon Sir Edward Leigh MP
- Rt Hon Damian Hinds MP
- Gregory Stafford MP
- Chris Green (former)
- Sally-Ann Hart (former)
- Eddie Hughes (former)
- Marco Longhi (former)
- Alexander Stafford (former)
- Sir Bill Cash (former)

== See also ==
- Conservative Christian Fellowship
- Catholics for Labour
