= John Hayes (British politician) =

British politician (born 1958)

The Right Honourable Sir John Hayes CBE MP
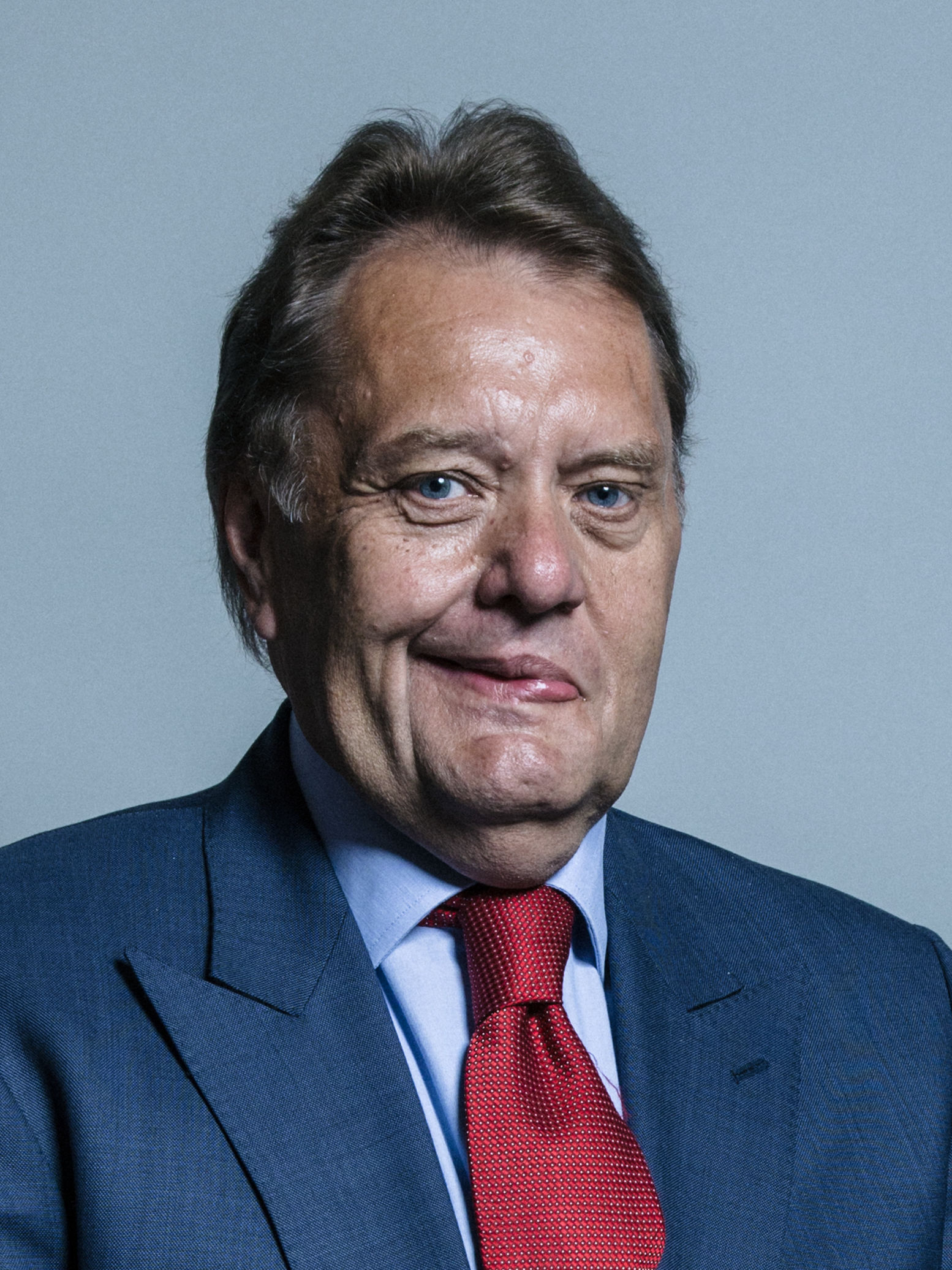
- Official portrait, 2017

Minister of State for Transport
- In office 16 July 2016 – 9 January 2018
- Prime Minister: Theresa May
- Preceded by: Robert Goodwill
- Succeeded by: Jo Johnson
- In office 15 July 2014 – 8 May 2015
- Prime Minister: David Cameron
- Preceded by: Position established
- Succeeded by: Andrew Jones

Minister of State for Security
- In office 8 May 2015 – 15 July 2016
- Prime Minister: David Cameron
- Preceded by: James Brokenshire
- Succeeded by: Ben Wallace

Minister without Portfolio Senior Parliamentary Adviser to the Prime Minister
- In office 28 March 2013 – 15 July 2014
- Prime Minister: David Cameron
- Preceded by: The Baroness Warsi
- Succeeded by: Robert Halfon

Minister of State for Energy
- In office 4 September 2012 – 28 March 2013
- Prime Minister: David Cameron
- Preceded by: Charles Hendry
- Succeeded by: Michael Fallon

Minister of State for Further Education, Skills and Lifelong Learning
- In office 13 May 2010 – 4 September 2012
- Prime Minister: David Cameron
- Preceded by: Kevin Brennan
- Succeeded by: Matt Hancock

Member of Parliament for South Holland and The Deepings
- Incumbent
- Assumed office 1 May 1997
- Preceded by: Constituency created
- Majority: 6,856 (14.9%)

Personal details
- Born: 23 June 1958 (age 68) Woolwich, London, England
- Party: Conservative
- Spouse: Susan Hopewell (m. 1997)
- Children: 2
- Education: University of Nottingham
- Website: www.johnhayes.uk

Sir John Henry Hayes CBE (born 23 June 1958) is a British Conservative Party politician who has been Member of Parliament (MP) for South Holland and The Deepings since 1997. He has held five ministerial positions and six shadow ministerial positions. Hayes was appointed as a Privy Councillor in April 2013 and a Knight Bachelor in November 2018.

Hayes is considered a social conservative, economic protectionist, communitarian and Eurosceptic. He strongly supported Britain's withdrawal from the EU and has spoken regularly about his belief in conservative ideas and philosophy. Hayes is known for speaking passionately and theatrically in the House of Commons chamber and has been described as a "colourful character" who is "popular and influential on the Tory right".

== Early life and career ==
John Hayes was born on 23 June 1958 in Woolwich into a working-class family, where he grew up on a council estate. He was educated at Colfe's Grammar School in Lewisham, before studying politics at the University of Nottingham, graduating with a BA and a PGCE in history and English. Hayes was involved in a campaign to create a pipe-smoking society affiliated to the Students' Union. He also chaired the University's Conservative Association from 1981 to 1982 while being President of one of the residential halls, Lincoln's Junior Common Room, and served as treasurer of the university's Students' Union from 1982 to 1983.

Hayes suffered a serious head injury in his early 20s, from which he has never fully recovered. He has focused much of his career on raising funds for research into acquired brain injury and support for those who suffer from it.

After university, he was a sales director for The Data Base Ltd, an information technology company based in Nottingham.

== Political career ==
Hayes was elected to Nottinghamshire County Council in 1985 where he was the Conservative Group Spokesman on Education and Chairman of its Campaigns Committee. He served on the council for 13 years.

At the 1987 general election, Hayes stood as the Conservative candidate in Derbyshire North East, coming second with 37.7% of the vote behind the Labour candidate Harry Barnes. He again stood in Derbyshire North East at the 1992 general election, coming second with 38.2% of the vote behind Harry Barnes.

== Parliamentary career ==
Hayes was elected to Parliament as MP for South Holland and The Deepings at the 1997 general election with 49.3% of the vote and a majority of 7,991. He made his maiden speech on 2 July 1997. He was re-elected as MP for South Holland and the Deepings at the 2001 general election with an increased vote share of 55.4% and an increased majority of 11,099. At the 2005 general election, Hayes was again re-elected with an increased vote share of 57.1% and an increased majority of 15,780. He was again re-elected at the 2010 general election with an increased vote share of 59.1% and an increased majority of 21,880.

In November 2012, during his time as Energy Minister, Hayes clashed with Liberal Democrat coalition partners when he said that there should be no further construction of onshore wind turbines, declaring "enough is enough".

Following his appointment as Energy Minister in March 2013 Hayes vowed to put "coal back into the coalition". During his tenure, subsidies for renewables were cut, planning rules for onshore wind were tightened, and a zero-carbon homes policy was scrapped.

Hayes became Minister without Portfolio in the Cabinet Office. He was appointed to the Privy Council on 9 April 2013.

He was appointed as Minister of State at the Department for Transport in the reshuffle on 15 July 2014 with responsibility for national roads, Highways Agency reform, the Infrastructure Bill, and maritime issues.

At the 2015 general election, Hayes was again re-elected, with an increased vote share of 59.6% and a decreased majority of 18,567.

Following the general election, Hayes was moved to the Home Office, where he was appointed "Minister of State, Minister for Security", with responsibility for counter-terrorism, security, serious organised crime and cyber crime.

In the government formed by Theresa May in July 2016, Hayes was reshuffled back to become a Minister at the Department for Transport.

Hayes was re-elected at the snap 2017 general election, with an increased vote share of 69.9% and an increased majority of 24,897.

He resigned from his post as Minister of State for Transport on 9 January 2018 during a cabinet reshuffle.

Hayes, in October 2018, described Britain's withdrawal from the EU as something "I've believed in for my whole life". He stated that voting Leave would provide an opportunity to "finally bring down the curtain on the Blair era". Following the referendum, Hayes criticised the "stunned hysteria" of an "establishment elite" who had "never before failed to get their own way".

Also in October 2018, Hayes, a protectionist, rejected "globalist free trade", stating his belief that government should "redistribute advantage". He supports tariffs designed to protect "British jobs and British workers". He criticised the "gig economy" and believes that only "meaningful careers that contribute to societal good" can restore economic opportunities within the local communities they exist to serve.

Hayes has consistently voted against same-sex marriage and civil partnerships. In line with his socially conservative views, he asserts marriage to be solely the lifetime union of one man and one woman.

In November 2018, Hayes is reported as having asked the UK Government to consider bringing back the death penalty: referencing Westminster Bridge attacker Khalid Masood, he said that: "If he had survived I think most of the British public would have been OK if he had received a fair trial and been put to death – most people would deem that appropriate". Additionally, Hayes states that, for murder, "I say capital punishment should be a sentence available to the courts but the death penalty should not be mandatory – that's always been my position".

Also in November 2018, Hayes stated his support for constitutional monarchy, voicing his opinion that the monarchy must resist the "culture of celebrity".

At the 2019 general election, he was again re-elected with an increased vote share of 75.9% and an increased majority of 30,838.

Following an interim report on the connections between colonialism and properties now in the care of the National Trust, including links with historic slavery, Hayes was among the signatories of a letter to The Telegraph in November 2020 from the group. The letter accused the National Trust of being "coloured by cultural Marxist dogma, colloquially known as the 'woke agenda'".

Hayes is the chair of the Common Sense Group, an informal group of conservative politicians and journalists who advocate for the future direction of the Conservative Party and the UK.

In July 2022, he said of precautions for a predicted 40° heatwave: "This is not a brave new world but a cowardly new world where we live in a country where we are frightened of the heat. It is not surprising that in snowflake Britain, the snowflakes are melting".

Hayes was again re-elected at the 2024 general election, with a decreased vote share of 38% and a decreased majority of 6,856.

== Personal life ==
Hayes married Susan Hopewell in 1997; they have two sons.

In addition to his seat in Parliament, Hayes holds three outside jobs, with one of them being a strategic adviser to BB Energy, a Dubai-based headquartered energy trading group. Since 2018 Hayes has received payments of £50,000 per year working for a Lebanese-based oil company BB Energy as a strategic adviser which has drawn criticism from Transparency International UK.

== Honours ==
Hayes was sworn as a member of the Privy Council on 15 May 2013 at Buckingham Palace.

He was appointed Commander of the Order of the British Empire (CBE) in the 2016 Prime Minister's Resignation Honours for political and public service.

Hayes was knighted in November 2018. This was an honour that was widely reported as bringing the awards system into disrepute; the supposition being that he had been offered and accepted the award in return for support for (or lack of opposition to) the Prime Minister's Brexit Draft Withdrawal Agreement. However, he subsequently announced his intention to vote against the proposed withdrawal agreement anyway.

Parliament of the United Kingdom
New constituency	Member of Parliament for South Holland and The Deepings; 1997–present	Incumbent
