= Conservative European Forum =

UK political group

Conservative European Forum (CEF)
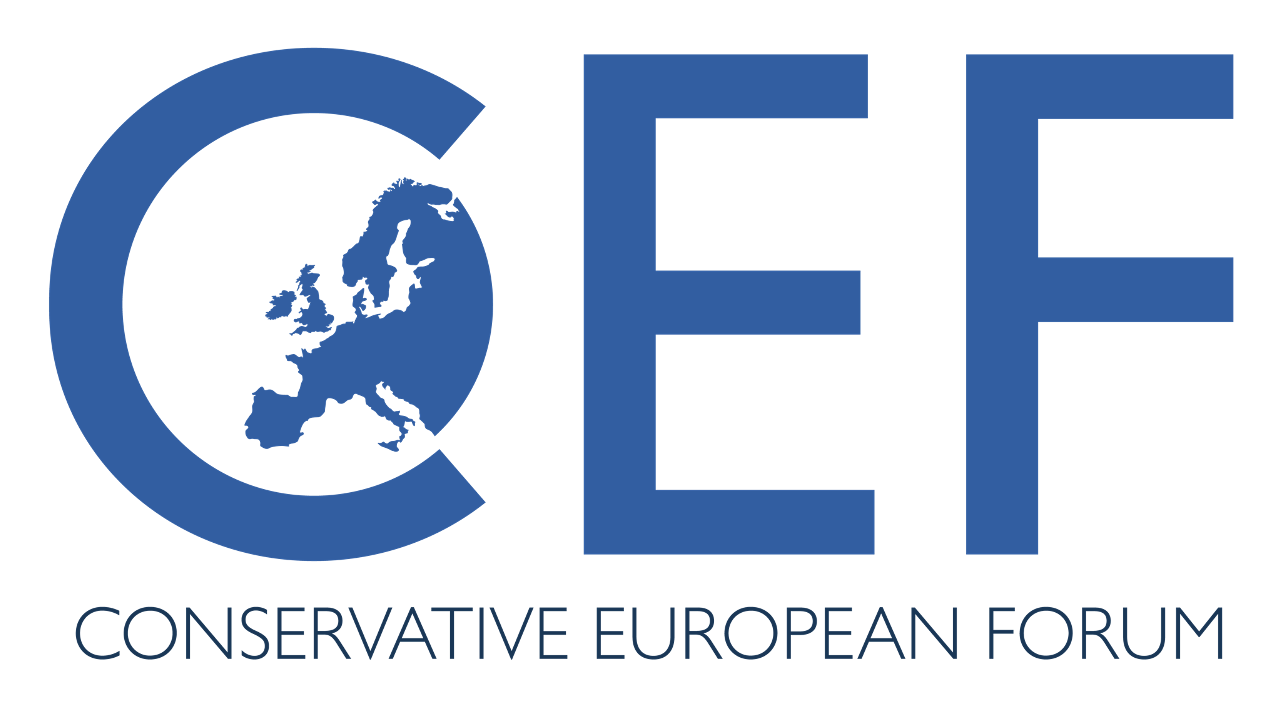
- President: David Lidington
- Vice President: Ros Altmann, John Bowis, Alistair Burt, Dirk Hazell, Antonio López-Istúriz White
- Chairperson: Stephen Hammond
- Founded: 1969
- Website: www.conservativeeuropeanforum.com

The Conservative European Forum (CEF) was founded in 1969 to promote the UK's entry into the European Economic Community. The organisation is committed to a positive and constructive approach to the UK's relationships with the democracies of Europe, including the European Union.

The organisation campaigned for the UK to remain in the EU during the 2016 referendum. Although CEF accepts the UK's departure from the European Union, it believes that it is in the best interests of the UK, EU and wider world that the UK maintains a close, strategic relationship with its European allies in the future. It is for this reason that CEF was resolutely opposed to a no-deal Brexit.

Sir David Lidington is the current chair and Stephen Hammond is the current deputy chair. Flick Drummond and Liz Spencer are the current vice chairs. Amber Rudd is the president and Baroness Sugg, John Bowis, Dominic Grieve and Dirk Hazell are the current vice presidents.

On 28 January 2021, Lidington and Hammond officially launched the Conservative European Forum (CEF), replacing the Conservative Group for Europe (CGE). The change in name represents the changes in focus, priorities and mission for the organisation. Now that the UK has left the European Union with a deal, CEF offers a home to Conservative supporters who favour close, strategic relationships with Europe. The organisation aims to be the leading centre-right organisation advocating for closer links with the countries and institutions of Europe.

== History ==
The Conservative European Forum was founded in 1969 under the chairmanship of David Baker. The organisation was originally called the European Forum and its first annual general Meeting was held just after Sir Edward Heath's General Election victory in 1970.

With the resignation of French President Charles De Gaulle who opposed UK membership of the EEC and the election of Edward Heath (a staunch pro-European) negotiations commenced for the UK to join the EEC. It was during these negotiations that the organisation changed its name to the Conservative Group for Europe (CGE).

CEF played a vital role in the UK's ascension to the EEC. The organisation brought together pro-European Conservatives and worked with like-minded parties in France to help secure UK's entry to the EEC on 1 January 1973.

The Conservative Party campaign for the UK to remain in the EEC during the 1975 referendum was officially launched by Prime Minister Margaret Thatcher when she addressed the Conservative European Forum.

In the 1980/90s the CEF's annual conference at Brandon Hall near Coventry attracted leading figures from the Conservative Party, MPs and MEPs and leaders from countries with which the Conservative Party was affiliated in the European Peoples Party.

Over the years of the Thatcher, Major and Cameron governments, CEF was active in support of pro-European Conservative policies including the creation of the Single Market, the Maastricht Treaty, enlargement to include the countries of Southern Europe and later Central and Eastern Europe.

Former Chairs of the organisation include, Sir James Spicer, Edwina Currie, Robert Walter, John Gummer (Lord Deben), Lord Brittan, David Curry, Ian Taylor, John Bowis and Neil Carmichael. Many Conservative politicians have also been associated including, Norman St John-Stevas, Lord Carrington, Douglas Hurd, Francis Pym, Chris Patten, Tom Spencer (former MEP) and Sir Tony Baldry.

== Current role ==
CEF remains an active organisation and campaigns both inside and outside the Conservative Party.

The organisation organises regular high-profile speaker meetings for its members, publishes policy and research papers on a wide range of issues, commissions polling and promotes a pro-European message in the media.

In 2018 the organisation launched a No2NoDeal campaign to warn of the damaging consequences of a no-deal Brexit. Many of the 21 Tory rebels who were expelled from the Conservative Party for opposing a no-deal were members of the Conservative European Forum.

During elections the CEF campaigns locally for pro-European Conservative candidates.

The organisation also holds events at the annual Conservative Party Conference.

The Young Conservative European Forum (formerly the Young Conservative Group for Europe) is the organisation's youth wing; it is an active member of both the European Democrat Students (EDS) and the Nordic Conservative Student Union (NKSU).

CEF continues its long tradition of fostering links with sister centre-right parties throughout the EU and maintains good connections with many political parties in the EPP.

== Membership ==
Membership of CEF is open to anyone who supports Conservative values and a close relationship between the UK and the EU. Individuals who are either members of the Conservative Party or who are independent conservatives (ideologically centre-right but without membership of any political party) are permitted to join.

The CEF has a large number of current and former parliamentarians as members and patrons including former Prime Minister Sir John Major and Deputy Prime Minister Michael Heseltine.

== See also ==
- List of organisations associated with the Conservative Party (UK)
