= Conservatives Abroad =

Overseas wing of the British Conservative Party

- President: Kemi Badenoch
- Chairman: Heather Harper MBE
- Founded: 1986
- Headquarters: Conservative Campaign HQ; 4 Matthew Parker Street, London, SW1H 9HQ, England
- Ideology: Conservatism (British); British unionism
- Political position: Centre-right
- National affiliation: Conservative Party

Website
- conservativesabroad.org

Conservatives Abroad is the British Conservative Party's global network of members and supporters living overseas.

Conservatives Abroad has members and groups around the world, including Europe, Asia, Africa, the Americas, and Oceania. While some countries have just one Conservatives Abroad group, some countries are represented by a number of different groups based in different areas, particularly when a country is large and Conservative overseas Britons are spread out such as Australia, France, Spain, and the USA.

== History ==
While some overseas Conservative groups had been active since the 1970s, Conservatives Abroad was not formally created until 1985. Its purpose is to keep Conservative supporters who are temporarily or permanently living abroad in touch with domestic politics in the United Kingdom, to campaign for the votes of the overseas British community, and increase the number of overseas registered voters in those communities. Sir James Spicer MP was appointed as its first Chairman.

Conservatives Abroad also serves its members' interests by raising issues and concerns facing Britons living overseas with politicians, and by lobbying to reform overseas voting laws. While the party leader is usually president of Conservatives Abroad, the individual local groups are represented and governed by a group representative.

== Campaigns ==
Conservatives Abroad have led the 'Votes for Life' campaign to allow British citizens living around the world to maintain their right to vote in British General Elections and reverse restrictions brought in by the Labour Government in 2000. As a result, this became a commitment in successive Conservative Party manifestos but its progress was blocked by the Liberal Democrats during the 2010-2015 Coalition Government. Finally, after the 2019 General Election, the measure was able to pass Parliament as part of the Elections Act 2022, thus re-enfranchising an estimated 3.4 million potential voters.

== Worldwide groups ==
Conservatives Abroad operate a global network of local groups. Originally it operated 35 active groups operating in 21 countries around the world, however, this figure has since grown.

=== Countries and territories ===
| Country / Territories | No. of Groups | Local Groups |
|---|---|---|
| Argentina | 1 | |
| Australia | 4 | Canberra, Melbourne, Perth, Sydney |
| Austria | 1 | |
| Azerbaijan | 1 | |
| Belgium | 1 | |
| Bermuda | 1 | |
| British Virgin Islands | 1 | |
| Canada | 1 | |
| Cayman Islands | 1 | |
| China | 3 | Beijing, Guangzhou, Shanghai |
| Colombia | 1 | |
| Cyprus | 1 | |
| Egypt | 1 | |
| Ethiopia | 1 | |
| France | 4 | Paris, South West, South of France, Normandy |
| Germany | 2 | Berlin, Frankfurt |
| Greece | 1 | |
| Gibraltar | 1 | |
| Guernsey | 1 | |
| Hong Kong | 1 | |
| Italy | 1 | |
| Isle of Man | 1 | |
| Bahrain | 1 | |
| Oman | 1 | |
| Qatar | 1 | |
| India | 1 | |
| Indonesia | 1 | |
| Israel | 1 | |
| Jamaica | 1 | |
| Japan | 1 | |
| Jersey | 1 | |
| Luxembourg | 1 | |
| Macau | 1 | |
| Malta | 1 | |
| Netherlands | 1 | |
| Norway | 1 | |
| Poland | 1 | |
| Philippines | 1 | |
| Romania | 1 | |
| Saudi Arabia | 1 | |
| Singapore | 1 | |
| Switzerland | 3 | Basel, Geneva, Zurich |
| Turkey | 1 | |
| South Africa | 2 | Cape Town, Johannesburg |
| Spain | 5 | Costa del Sol, Jávea, Madrid, Mallorca, Tenerife |
| Thailand | 1 | |
| Uruguay | 1 | |
| United Arab Emirates | 2 | Abu Dhabi, Dubai |
| United States | 7 | California, Florida, Chicago, New Jersey, New York, Texas, Washington, D.C. |
