= Blue Collar Conservatism =

Conservative Party (UK) pressure group

Blue Collar Conservative Caucus
- President: Esther McVey
- Chairperson: Ben Bradley
- Founded: 2012; 14 years ago by Esther McVey
- Ideology: Conservatism; Right-wing populism Social conservatism Euroscepticism
- Political position: Right-wing
- National affiliation: Conservative Party
- Colours: Blue
- House of Commons (Conservative seats until 2024): 130 / 345

Blue Collar Conservatives are a pressure group and caucus of Conservative Party Members of Parliament who identify as working class conservatives. It was founded in 2012 by former cabinet minister Esther McVey and a former conservative parliamentary candidate for Workington and Fujitsu UK's head of corporate affairs, Clark Vasey. It was relaunched at the beginning of the 2019 Conservative Party leadership election by Esther McVey, Ben Bradley, the MP for Mansfield since 2017, and Scott Mann, the MP for North Cornwall since 2015. The relaunch was reported to have rivalled the recent establishment of the One Nation Conservatives.

As a group, they aim to "champion working people and develop a conservative agenda to benefit the voters and communities most neglected by Labour". In the weeks prior to becoming prime minister, Boris Johnson said, "the blue-collar conservatism agenda – particularly in relation to supporting schools, police and other public services [...] is something I've already signalled I want to take forward in government." The New Statesman has described the caucus as an influential grouping within the parliamentary party.

In October 2022, Esther McVey stood down as chair and was replaced by Lee Anderson.

== Campaigns ==
The group focus their campaigning on empowering blue-collar workers and other working-class people. They have also campaigned on Brexit, public services, Education in the United Kingdom and law enforcement. The values of the caucus focus on "Conservative Values, Practical Delivery" and were attributed to the result of the 2019 general election, where the Conservatives won many seats in the "Red wall".

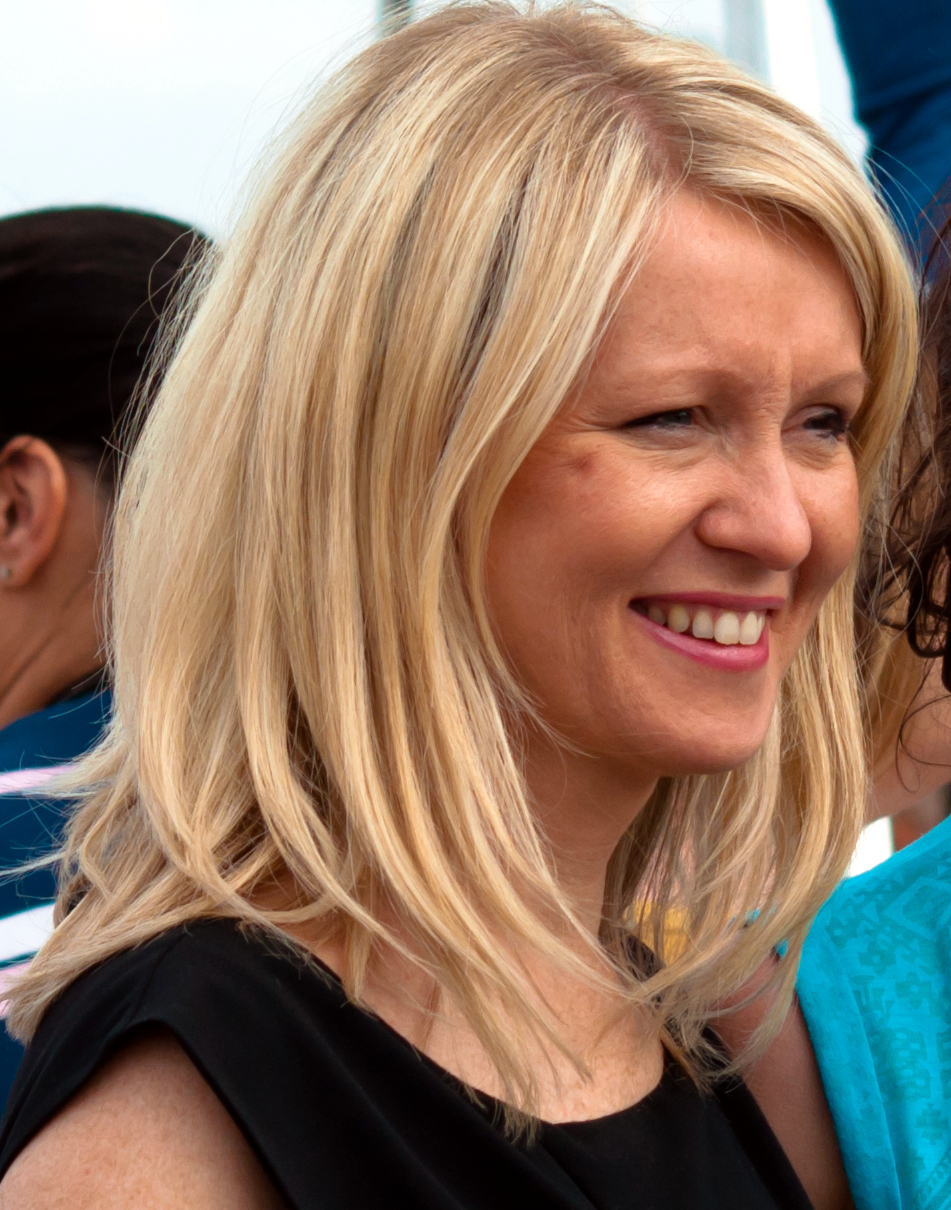
Esther McVey MP founded the group.

Many in the caucus have supported cancelling High Speed 2.

== Leadership until 2024 ==
=== Board members ===
- Esther McVey MP, president and founder
- Ben Bradley MP, chairman
- Councillor Clark Vasey, director
- Dehenna Davison MP, vice chair
- Scott Mann MP, vice chair
- Eddie Hughes MP, vice chair
- John Stevenson MP, vice chair
- Lee Rowley MP, vice chair
- Andrea Jenkyns MP, vice chair
- Andrew Lewer MP, vice chair
- Sir Gary Streeter MP, vice chair

== Membership until 2024 ==
According to the group's website; the members/supporters of the caucus included:

Image	Member of Parliament
	Adam Afriyie
	Lucy Allan
	Lee Anderson
	Stuart Anderson
	Caroline Ansell
	Sarah Atherton
	Shaun Bailey
	Duncan Baker
	Simon Baynes
	Aaron Bell
	Scott Benton
	Jake Berry
	Saqib Bhatti
	Bob Blackman
	Peter Bottomley
	Ben Bradley (chairperson)
	Graham Brady
	Jack Brereton
	Paul Bristow
	Sara Britcliffe
	Fiona Bruce
	Robert Buckland
	Rob Butler
	Alun Cairns
	Andy Carter
	Maria Caulfield
	Brendan Clarke-Smith
	Chris Clarkson
	Alberto Costa
	Robert Courts
	James Daly
	James Davies
	Gareth Davies
	Philip Davies (Vice-chair)
	David Davis
	Dehenna Davison (Vice-chair)
	Sarah Dines
	Iain Duncan Smith
	Mark Eastwood
	George Eustice
	David Evennett
	Ben Everitt
	Simon Fell
	Katherine Fletcher
	Mark Fletcher
	Nick Fletcher
	Liam Fox
	Richard Fuller
	Mark Garnier
	Peter Gibson
	Jo Gideon
	Cheryl Gillan
	John Glen
	James Gray
	Chris Green
	James Grundy
	Jonathan Gullis
	Robert Halfon
	Trudy Harrison
	Sally-Ann Hart
	John Hayes
	Gordon Henderson
	Darren Henry
	Antony Higginbotham
	Richard Holden
	Kevin Hollinrake
	Philip Hollobone
	Paul Howell
	Nigel Huddleston
	Neil Hudson
	Eddie Hughes (Vice-chair)
	Jane Hunt
	Ranil Jayawardena
	Bernard Jenkin
	Mark Jenkinson
	Andrea Jenkyns (Vice-chair)
	Daniel Kawczynski
	Greg Knight
	Julian Knight
	Eleanor Laing
	John Lamont
	Robert Largan
	Pauline Latham
	Edward Leigh
	Andrew Lewer (Vice-chair)
	Ian Levy
	Julian Lewis
	Chris Loder
	Mark Logan
	Marco Longhi
	Julia Lopez
	Jonathan Lord
	Tim Loughton
	Craig Mackinlay
	Cherilyn Mackrory
	Rachel Maclean
	Alan Mak
	Kit Malthouse
	Anthony Mangnall
	Scott Mann (Vice-chair)
	Paul Maynard
	Jason McCartney
	Karl McCartney
	Stephen McPartland
	Esther McVey (Founder)
	Johnny Mercer
	Huw Merriman
	Stephen Metcalfe
	Robin Millar
	Damien Moore
	Robbie Moore
	Penny Mordaunt
	Kieran Mullan
	Holly Mumby-Croft
	Lia Nici
	Neil O'Brien
	Andrew Percy
	Priti Patel
	Tom Pursglove
	Tom Randall
	Nicola Richards
	Angela Richardson
	Andrew Rosindell
	Lee Rowley (Vice-chair)
	Dean Russell
	David Rutley
	Gary Sambrook
	Selaine Saxby
	Bob Seely
	Andrew Selous
	Chloe Smith
	Greg Smith
	Henry Smith
	Amanda Solloway
	Alexander Stafford
	Jane Stevenson
	John Stevenson (Vice-chair)
	Gary Streeter (Vice-chair)
	Julian Sturdy
	James Sunderland
	Robert Syms
	Derek Thomas
	Anne-Marie Trevelyan
	Tom Tugendhat
	Matt Vickers
	Martin Vickers
	Robin Walker
	Jamie Wallis
	Suzanne Webb
	Heather Wheeler
	Craig Whittaker
	Mike Wood
	Jacob Young
	Nadhim Zahawi

== Blue Collar Conversations: from pub to podcast ==
Since its relaunch, the group travelled to pubs across the country holding open events called 'Blue Collar Conversations' in which UK cabinet ministers and MPs discussed ideas and policies in an informal setting with members of the public. Speaking at one of those events, a member of the group is reported to have said: "The party needs to adopt the blue-collar Conservatism approach – travel to pubs across the country and reach out to the people… a pub-ocracy!"

The group then launched a weekly podcast of the same name. The podcast is described as "a space to champion working people". New episodes are released every Sunday and cover a range of topical issues, from crime and justice to care homes and football, and the cosmetic industry to education. The podcast is hosted by Esther McVey and guests have included Nick Knowles, Ching He Huang, Toby Young, Linda Yueh, Tom Harwood, Chris Wright, Mark Radcliffe and Bradford City A.F.C.; however, the podcast prides itself on also providing a platform for everyday working people.

== See also ==
- Social class in the United Kingdom
