= Conservative Way Forward =

British pressure and campaigning group

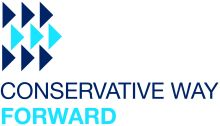
- Formation: 1991; 35 years ago
- Key people: Cecil Parkinson; Eric Forth; Sir Christopher Chope; Margaret Thatcher; Chrissie Boyle
- Affiliations: Conservative Party; Thatcherism; Euroscepticism
- Website: www.conservativewayforward.com

Conservative Way Forward (CWF) was a British pressure ad campaigning group, which is Thatcherite in its outlook and agenda. Margaret Thatcher was its founding president. It was founded in 1991 to "defend and build upon the achievements of the Conservative Party under Margaret Thatcher's leadership, and to adapt the principles of her era in government to modern concerns and challenges".

The group organised speaker meetings, seminars and receptions, supported and attended by Government Ministers past and future.

In all leadership elections since 1997, the candidate supported by Conservative Way Forward ultimately won.

Conservative Way Forward was to be relaunched in 2022 by MP Steve Baker who was said to be its new chairman.

== Margaret Thatcher Library ==
On 14 April 2013, the group announced that it was setting up a Margaret Thatcher Library as a permanent memorial to the former prime minister. The project will be based on the Ronald Reagan Presidential Library in California, and has the support of several current and former Conservative cabinet members. It is expected to run training courses for young Conservatives and exchange student programmes to the US and elsewhere, as well as house artifacts from her premiership.

== Officers ==
In December 2015 Paul Abbott resigned as chief executive, and Donal Blaney resigned as chairman, following the suicide of Elliott Johnson soon after being made redundant as an employee of Conservative Way Forward. This followed the resignations of Minister of State for International Development Grant Shapps, and the expulsion from the Conservative Party of Mark Clarke, following allegations of bullying of Elliott Johnson.

Executive director:

- Chrissie Boyle (2015–)

Founding President:

- Margaret Thatcher

Honorary Vice Presidents:

- Christopher Chope, former Transport Minister and former Chairman of Conservative Way Forward
- Liam Fox, International Trade Secretary and former Defence Secretary
- Greg Hands, former Chief Secretary to the Treasury
- William Hague, former Foreign Secretary
- Norman Tebbit, former Party Chairman
- Sajid Javid, Home Secretary, former Communities Secretary and Business Secretary

== Parliamentary Council ==
Chairman:

- Gerald Howarth, former defence minister (2015–)

Deputy Chairman:

- James Cleverly

Council Members

- Conor Burns
- Greg Hands
- Charlie Elphicke
- Liam Fox

== Board of Management ==
Chairman

- Gerald Howarth

== History ==
Former Honorary Chairmen:

- Cecil Parkinson (1991–1997)
- Eric Forth (1997–2001)
- Christopher Chope (2001–2009)
- Don Porter CBE (2009–2012)
- Donal Blaney (−2015)
