= Richard Fuller (Conservative politician) =

British politician (born 1962)

Richard Fuller CBE MP
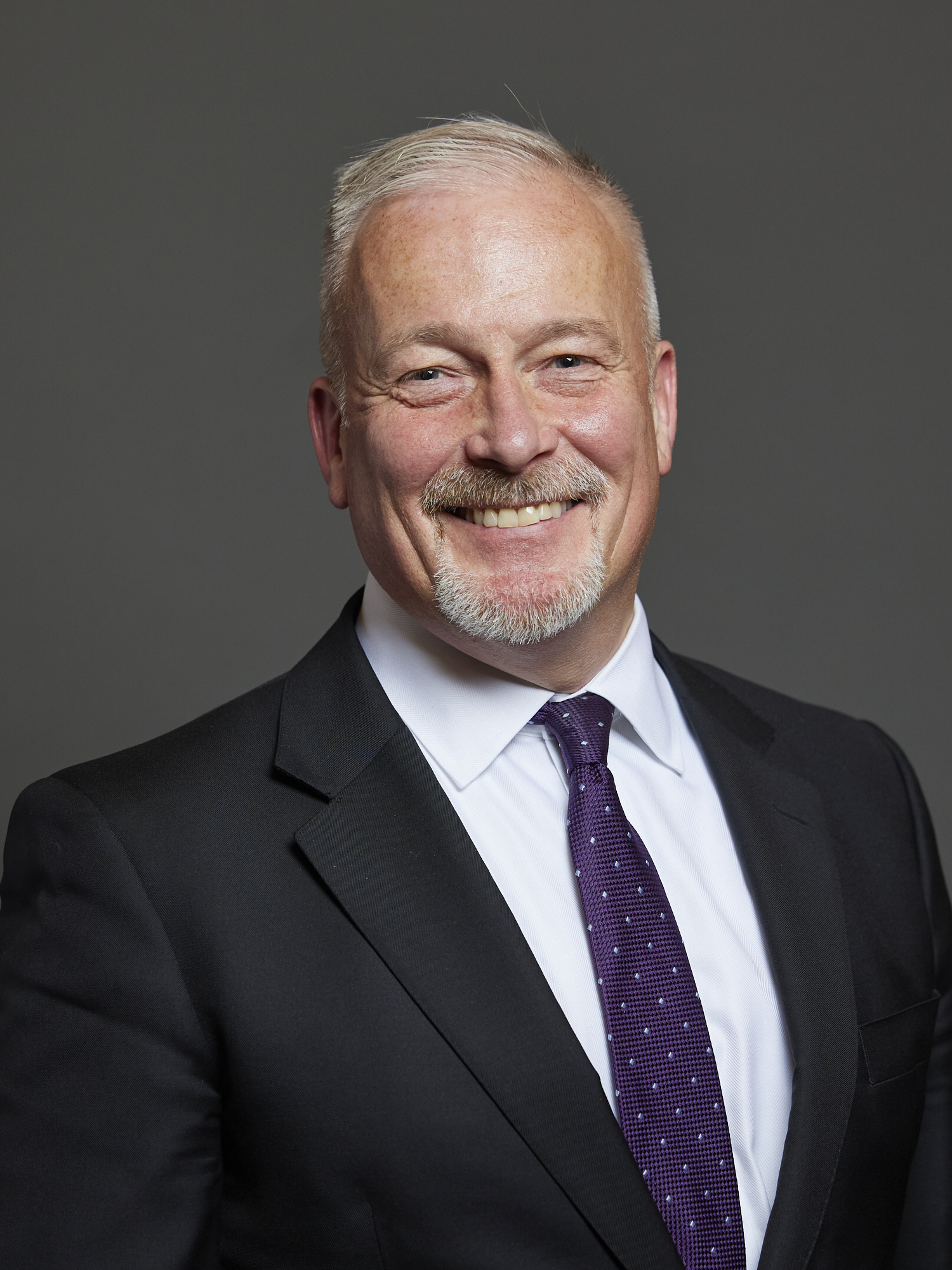
- Official portrait, 2024

Shadow Chief Secretary to the Treasury
- Incumbent
- Assumed office 5 November 2024
- Leader: Kemi Badenoch
- Preceded by: Laura Trott

Interim Chairman of the Conservative Party
- In office 8 July 2024 – 4 November 2024
- Leader: Rishi Sunak
- Preceded by: Richard Holden
- Succeeded by: Dominic Johnson; Nigel Huddleston

Economic Secretary to the Treasury
- In office 8 July 2022 – 27 October 2022
- Prime Minister: Boris Johnson; Liz Truss
- Preceded by: John Glen
- Succeeded by: Andrew Griffith

Member of Parliament
- Incumbent
- Assumed office 12 December 2019
- Preceded by: Alistair Burt
- Constituency: North East Bedfordshire (2019–2024); North Bedfordshire (2024-present)
- Majority: 5,414 (10.5%)
- In office 6 May 2010 – 3 May 2017
- Preceded by: Patrick Hall
- Succeeded by: Mohammad Yasin
- Constituency: Bedford

Personal details
- Born: Richard Quentin Fuller; 30 May 1962 (age 64) Bedford, Bedfordshire, England
- Party: Conservative
- Education: University College, Oxford; Harvard Business School
- Website: richardfuller.co.uk

Richard Quentin Fuller CBE (born 30 May 1962) is a British politician who has been Shadow Chief Secretary to the Treasury since November 2024, having previously served as the interim Chairman of the Conservative Party from July to November 2024. He has been Member of Parliament (MP) for North Bedfordshire, formerly North East Bedfordshire, since 2019. He represented Bedford from 2010 to 2017.

Fuller previously served as the Economic Secretary to the Treasury from July to October 2022. In the 2024 Birthday Honours, he was appointed a Commander of the Order of the British Empire (CBE) for political and public service. He had previously achieved prominence as leader of the Young Conservatives from 1985 to 1987.

== Early life ==
Fuller was educated at Hazeldene School and Bedford Modern School (then a direct grant school), followed by University College, Oxford (1981–84), where he studied Politics, Philosophy & Economics, and Harvard Business School (1987–89) for his MBA.

Fuller was President of the Oxford University Conservative Association (OUCA) in 1983. Following the failed nomination of Conservative candidates for the Oxford University Student Union (OUSU), Oxford's student paper Cherwell ran the headline "OUCA falls apart" and Fuller lost a vote of confidence but remained in office. As President, Fuller also provided the first Conservative Party platform for the African National Congress, then a proscribed terrorist organisation in then still apartheid South Africa but not proscribed in the UK.

== Professional career ==
Fuller joined the management consultancy company, LEK Consulting in 1984 as part of their first intake of university graduates. In 1986, Fuller transferred to Sydney to help establish the Australian practice of LEK. After Harvard Business School, he worked in South Korea, before rejoining LEK in Australia and then working for two years on assignment with the Philippine Long Distance Telephone Company (PLDT) in Manila, Philippines. In 2000, he joined the alternative assets firm, Investcorp, to help establish their technology ventures group. Fuller joined the board of the Osborne Association, a New York-based charity working with offenders and ex-offenders in 2002. Fuller moved to the United States in 2004 and rejoined LEK in Los Angeles in 2007. He became a non-executive director of Impero Software prior to returning to Parliament in 2019.

== Political career ==
Fuller joined the Conservative Party and began delivering leaflets for Trevor Skeet, the MP for Bedford during the 1979 general election. As a Young Conservative Fuller became a member of the moderate (Tory Reform Group) faction that controlled the National Young Conservatives, in opposition to Monday Club and libertarian elements attempting to wrest control of the movement.

=== Young Conservatives ===
Fuller was elected National Chairman of the Young Conservatives from 1985 to 1987, campaigning on social issues such as housing, changes to drugs policies as well as on tackling unemployment. Fuller continued the anti-apartheid policies initiated under previous YC chairmen Iain Picton, Phil Pedley and John Guthrie.

=== National YC Report on Infiltration & Extremism ===
The National YC Report was passed in 1984 under Phil Pedley's Chairmanship. Fuller resisted pressure from Conservative Central Office to withdraw support from Pedley who (along with the BBC) was being sued by Harvey Proctor, Neil Hamilton and Gerald Howarth. When the BBC Governors suddenly intervened and ordered the trial be abandoned, Fuller voiced his concerns as to why the trial had been abruptly abandoned. Concern grew over the actions of Malcolm McAlpine, a BBC Governor and a cousin of Alistair McAlpine, the treasurer of the Conservative Party. "He denied yesterday that he had promised Mr Hamilton that he could 'deliver' the governors behind a settlement." The Times reported that: "Mr Richard Fuller, YC Chairman and a member of the group which endorsed the infiltration report by 39 votes to one, pledged financial backing to Philip Pedley who announced he was fighting on."

=== Parliament ===
Fuller stood as the Conservative candidate for the Bedford constituency in the 2005 general election, losing to the incumbent Labour MP Patrick Hall. Fuller stood again for the Bedford constituency in the 2010 general election, and was elected to office on 6 May 2010, replacing Patrick Hall. He was re-elected in the 2015 general election, but lost to the Labour candidate in the 2017 general election. As MP, Fuller led successful campaigns to retain key services at Bedford Hospital and to enable the establishment of Bedford Free School. Fuller launched a venture fund to invest in local businesses and ran the Bedford Community Business School. In October 2014, Fuller was one of 39 Conservative MPs who voted in favour of recognising Palestine.

Fuller stood and won in North East Bedfordshire in the 2019 general election following Alistair Burt's decision to stand down after having the whip removed and then returned.

Fuller was a member of the Business, Energy and Industrial Strategy Committee from 2015 to 2017 and rejoined the Committee following the 2019 general election. Fuller played a leading role in the inquiry into the sale and acquisition of BHS and later proposed the first successful motion in the House of Commons to recommend the removal of a knighthood from former BHS owner Sir Philip Green.

Fuller campaigned against the use of detention for immigration purposes achieving restrictions on the detention of pregnant women and co-authoring the 2015 report, "The Use of Immigration Detention in the UK" by the All Party Parliamentary Group on Migration.

Fuller was one of 158 MPs who supported Brexit ahead of the 2016 EU Referendum.

Fuller was appointed Economic Secretary to the Treasury by outgoing Prime Minister Boris Johnson, following the resignation of John Glen during the July 2022 United Kingdom government crisis. He continued in this position under the brief administration of Liz Truss. He left government in October 2022 shortly after Rishi Sunak replaced Truss as Prime Minister. He was replaced by Andrew Griffith MP.

In 2023, he was reselected for the new North Bedfordshire constituency. Fuller was re-elected with a decreased majority of 5,414 votes.

Following the Conservative defeat in the 2024 General Election, and the subsequent resignation of Richard Holden, Fuller was appointed by Rishi Sunak to serve as interim Chairman of the Conservative Party for the remainder of his leadership.

Parliament of the United Kingdom
| Preceded by Patrick Hall | Member of Parliament for Bedford; 2010–2017 | Succeeded by Mohammad Yasin |
| Preceded by Alistair Burt | Member of Parliament for North East Bedfordshire; 2019–2024 | Constituency abolished |
| New constituency | Member of Parliament for North Bedfordshire; 2024–present | Incumbent |
Political offices
| Preceded by John Glen | Economic Secretary to the Treasury; 2022 | Succeeded by Andrew Griffith |
| Preceded by Laura Trott | Shadow Chief Secretary to the Treasury; 2024–present | Incumbent |
Party political offices
| Preceded by Richard Holden | Chairman of the Conservative Party; Interim; 2024 | Succeeded by Nigel Huddleston; The Lord Johnson of Lainston |
