= Nick Robinson (journalist) =

British political journalist (born 1963)

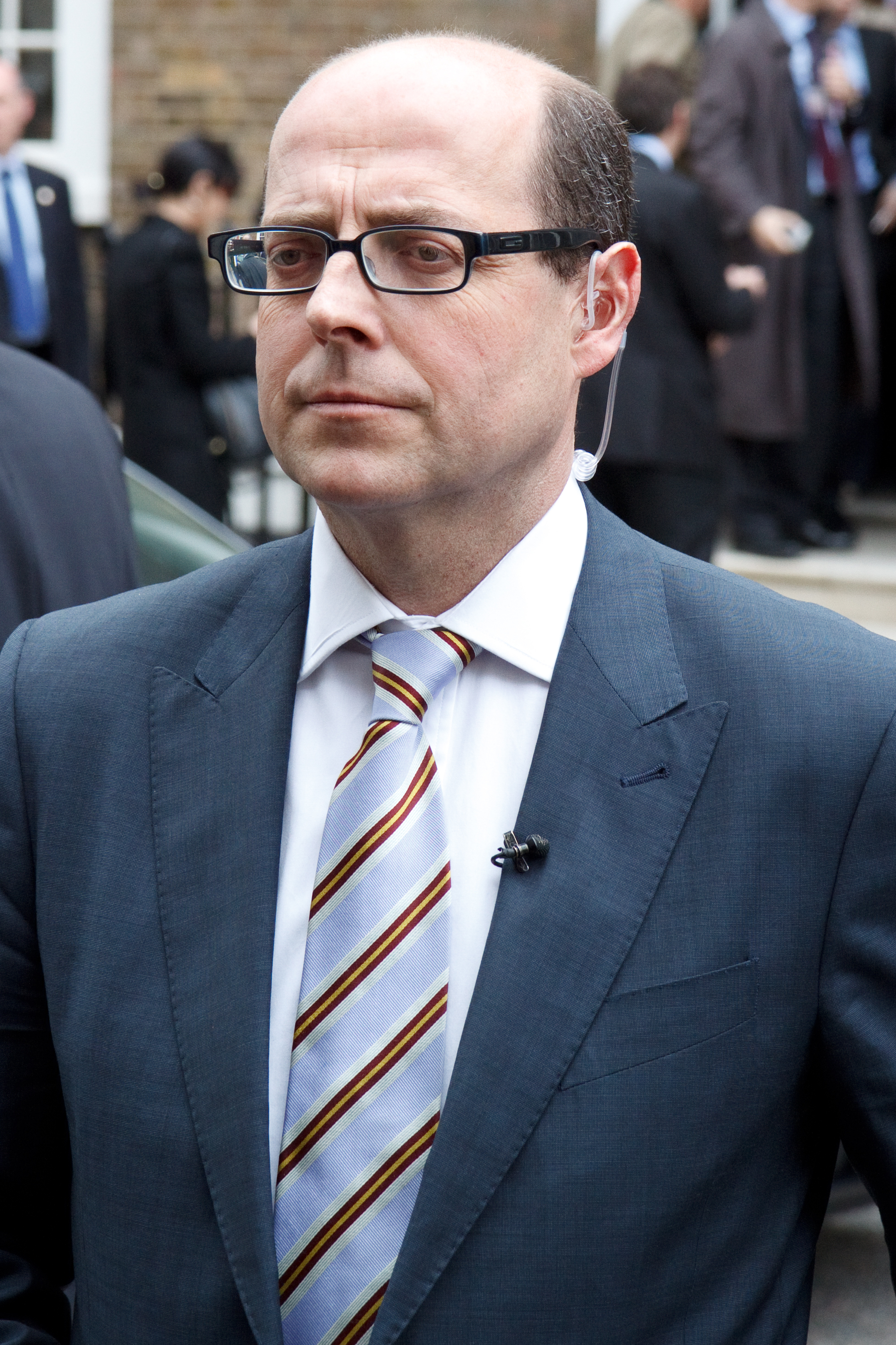
- Robinson in 2010
- Born: Nicholas Anthony Robinson; 5 October 1963 (age 62); Macclesfield, Cheshire, England
- Education: Cheadle Hulme School
- Alma mater: University College, Oxford
- Occupation: Journalist
- Years active: 1986–present
- Employer: BBC
- Known for: Presenter of The Today Programme (2015–present)
- Notable credit(s): Panorama; BBC News; ITN
- Title: Political editor of BBC News (2005–2015)
- Spouse: Pippa (m. 1991)
- Children: 3

Nicholas Anthony Robinson (born 5 October 1963) is a British journalist who has been a presenter on BBC Radio 4's Today programme since 2015. Before this, he spent ten years as political editor for BBC News and has had many other roles with the broadcaster.

Robinson was interested in politics from an early age. He studied philosophy, politics and economics at the University of Oxford, where he was also president of the Oxford University Conservative Association. Starting out in broadcasting at Piccadilly Radio, after a year as president of the Conservative Party youth group, he worked his way up as a producer, eventually becoming deputy editor of Panorama before becoming a political correspondent in 1996.

Robinson became the BBC's chief political correspondent in 1999. Between 2002 and 2005, he worked for ITV News as political editor but then returned to the BBC assuming the same role.

Known for his confrontational and provocative approach, Robinson has on several occasions caused a stir with his style of questioning, particularly of national leaders such as George W. Bush. He has presented programmes such as Westminster Live, Weekend Breakfast and Late Night Live on BBC Radio 5 Live, and Newsnight on BBC Two.

== Early life ==
Robinson was born in Macclesfield, Cheshire, England, on 5 October 1963, to a translator mother and a sales director father. His mother Evelyn (née Rosenberg) was born in Shanghai, where her German-Jewish parents had fled during the 1930s. His father, Colonel Desmond Robinson, was of English background. His parents first met at the University of Geneva in Switzerland, and married three months later.

Robinson was interested in political journalism from the age of eight. He was privately educated at Cheadle Hulme School and then went to University College, Oxford, where he read philosophy, politics and economics.

While travelling in Europe in 1982, he survived a car crash in Lille, France, in which the car, a two-door Volkswagen Beetle, exploded; his friends James Nelson and Will Redhead (son of Brian Redhead, an earlier presenter of Today on BBC Radio 4) were killed. Robinson was "severely burned", spent five weeks in hospital and had to defer his university place. Brian Redhead became Robinson's mentor, and later encouraged his career in political journalism, giving him a copy of Tony Benn's Arguments for Socialism for his birthday. However, Robinson's early political affiliations were to the right.

== Political activism ==
Robinson was a founder-member of Macclesfield Young Conservatives (YC) and rose through the ranks, becoming Cheshire YC Chairman from 1982 to 1984 and became a key activist in the moderate-controlled North West Area organisation. Philip Pedley, as National YC Chairman, co-opted Robinson onto the YC National Advisory Committee in 1983 and appointed him National Campaign Director of Youth for Multilateral Disarmament. Robinson was elected National Vice Chairman from 1985 to 1987 and succeeded a fellow moderate, Richard Fuller, when Robinson was elected Chairman of the National Young Conservatives on the moderate ticket against strong right-wing opposition (1987–1988).

At university, he was President of the Oxford University Conservative Association in 1985.

== Career ==
=== Early career: 1986–1996 ===
Robinson's first position in broadcasting was at Piccadilly Radio in Manchester, which he took up while recovering from his injuries. He joined the BBC in 1986 as a production trainee, and later worked extensively as a television and radio producer for a variety of shows including Newsround and Crimewatch. He then became an assistant producer for On the Record, and in 1993 was promoted to deputy editor of Panorama, a position he held for three years. In 1995, whilst Robinson was at Panorama, he wrote an internal BBC memorandum questioning how an interview with Prime Minister John Major could be defended in the run-up to the 1995 Scottish local elections. When leaked, this gained attention from the Labour Party, which perceived it as the legitimised denial of equal time in the run-up to local elections.

=== Political correspondent: 1996–2002 ===
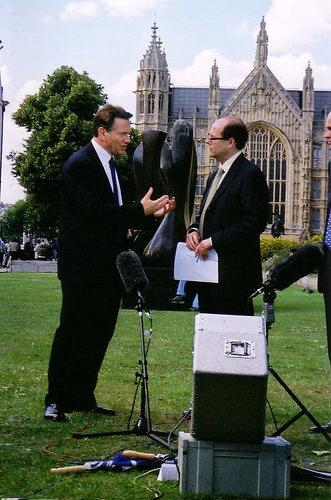
Robinson interviewing Michael Portillo for BBC News in July 2001, close to the Palace of Westminster

In 1996, he became a political correspondent, presenting Weekend Breakfast and Late Night Live on BBC Radio 5 Live, and in 1997 he covered the general election for BBC Radio. In October 1999 he became BBC News 24's chief political correspondent, and also presented Westminster Live. In the run-up to the 2001 general election, Robinson started keeping a daily diary of the campaign. Entitled The Campaign Today, it later became Newslog, and continued to be updated until Robinson left the BBC. When he returned in 2005, he began a new blog with the same name.

=== ITN political editor: 2002–2005 ===
Robinson left the BBC in 2002 to join Independent Television News (ITN) as the political editor of ITV News. Tom Bradby, who later succeeded him in the role, described the appointment as "bold, imaginative and instantly successful". Robinson stayed with ITN for three years, and caused a major stir early in the 2005 general election campaign, when a Labour Party poster was unveiled. The poster claimed the Conservative Party would initiate cuts of £35 billion to public services if elected; Robinson challenged Prime Minister Tony Blair, claiming the poster was misleading, which forced Blair to admit the £35 billion figure was "disingenuous".

Later on in the election campaign, Labour announced that Tony Blair would be making "the most important speech of the campaign" on immigration, with a specially invited audience. Robinson asked Blair why there were only white people in the audience, and Blair pointed out a single Asian man to disprove Robinson. Later, Robinson stated: "We know that the big two parties carefully select audiences to give a particular appearance. Is it a great controversy to point this out? That's informing the audience." On election night, Robinson joined presenters Jonathan Dimbleby and Alastair Stewart to reveal the results with political analysis.

=== Return to the BBC: 2005–present ===
Robinson left ITN and was appointed as the BBC political editor in preference to Martha Kearney in August 2005, replacing Andrew Marr.

Robinson continued his provocative approach to journalism, and on more than one occasion had run-ins with powerful politicians. During Tony Blair's visit to Israel in 2006 to discuss the Lebanon War, journalists were asked not to bring up the ongoing rift with Gordon Brown. Bradby, then the ITV political editor, asked a question on the subject but was told it was "disrespectful". Robinson then followed on the same topic, asking a difficult question on the feud between the Chancellor and Prime Minister. He was criticised for distracting from the main issue of the conference, but he argued that "I'm paid to ask questions ... particularly at a time when there are incredibly serious allegations ... I react very badly to organised attempts to stop journalists asking questions." Robinson later criticised Blair's announcement of his intention to stand down. He explained how he considered the setup "stage management", and how no journalists were allowed to ask questions.

In December 2006, George W. Bush showed dissatisfaction when he was asked if he was in denial about the situation in Iraq (the most Bush had said about the situation was that the increase in attacks was "unsettling"). Bush replied "It's bad in Iraq. Does that help?". He had another run-in with Bush at a press conference at Camp David, when Bush asked him "you still hanging around?". He then suggested to Robinson, with reference to the fact that it was a hot day, that "next time you should cover your bald head". As Bush walked away, Robinson replied "I didn't know you cared", to which Bush responded "I don't". Robinson described his quip as a "fatal error" on his blog. In a final encounter in 2008, Bush joked with Robinson about still not wearing his hat.

Robinson continues to keep a political blog on the BBC website. On 5 May 2006, he said that when he heard about Charles Clarke's sacking in the 2006 Cabinet reshuffle, he was "naked in bed." He later apologised, saying he was "merely trying to add authenticity. That's the naked truth". Another post, dated 25 February 2008, criticised MPs defending Michael Martin against allegations of the misuse of expenses, which caused controversy in parliament.

As political editor, Robinson worked across the BBC's politics-related programmes, such as Today on BBC Radio 4, The Daily Politics and Newsnight. He has been a member of BBC's election night team.

He has also appeared as a guest on other television programmes, including Children in Need, Have I Got News for You and Top Gear.

Robinson has made several documentaries. In May 2011, he presented The Street That Cut Everything, where residents of a street in Preston, Lancashire had their council services withdrawn for six weeks as an experiment. In 2014, he presented The Truth About Immigration for BBC Two.

For radio, he made The Prime Ministers – a 16-part biographical series for BBC Radio 4. In advance of the 2015 general election, he made a three-part documentary, entitled Can Democracy Work.

It was announced on 9 July 2015 that, beginning that autumn, Robinson would become a presenter on the early morning BBC Radio 4 programme Today, taking over from James Naughtie.

On 5 February 2019, Robinson co-hosted the live final of BBC Two's Icons: The Greatest Person of the 20th Century alongside Claudia Winkleman.

Robinson hosted the final head-to-head debate between Boris Johnson and Jeremy Corbyn prior to the 2019 general election.

It was reported in February 2020 that Robinson had been approached in connection with a possibly lucrative future role at the upcoming radio station Times Radio, owned by Rupert Murdoch. However he remains at the BBC.

== Criticism ==
Robinson has been criticised for allegedly reporting with a pro-Conservative bias. Alastair Campbell brought up his history of Conservative affiliations during an interview. Bias was claimed particularly in the coverage of the 2010 general election; a Facebook group titled "Nick Robinson should not be the BBC's political editor" was set up in August 2010. In a 2005 interview with David Rowan, the UK editor of Wired News, Robinson insisted "that his involvement [with the Conservatives] ceased twenty years ago".

On 20 October 2010, following a live BBC News at Six report outside Parliament covering the 2010 Spending Review, Robinson silently took the anti-war, anti-cuts placard that had been waved directly behind him throughout, broke it in two and stamped on it. Afterwards, another protester, who had climbed the steps of the gantry where the BBC were broadcasting to film the protest on a mobile phone, said: "You should be ashamed of yourself, mate. Shame on you!" Robinson replied "I'm not remotely ashamed of myself. Why should I be ashamed of myself?" He wrote in his blog afterwards: "I lost my temper and I regret that. However, as I explained afterwards to the protesters who disrupted my broadcast, there are many opportunities to debate whether the troops should be out of Afghanistan without the need to stick a sign on a long pole and wave it in front of a camera". Some days later, Robinson read out a jokingly ambiguous "letter of apology" on the comedy panel show Have I Got News for You, broadcast on 4 November 2010.

On the 22 May 2013 edition of the BBC News at Six, Robinson relayed the news that the fatal stabbing of an off-duty British soldier in London that afternoon was being treated by the government as a terrorist incident, but attracted criticism after quoting a source describing the perpetrators as being "of Muslim appearance". The BBC received 43 complaints about Robinson's use of the term, and he issued an apology on his BBC blog the following day.

On 11 September 2014, as part of the coverage of the Scottish independence referendum, Robinson had a dispute with Scottish National Party leader Alex Salmond. The previous day Robinson had reported that Lloyds Bank and RBS would be moving their registered offices from Scotland to London in the event of a "Yes" vote. In the exchange Robinson asked Salmond two questions: the first about the economic impact of RBS moving its headquarters; the second, more general, about why to trust a politician when CEO's of certain companies advised against independence. In his response, Salmond answered both questions over a 5-minute period, then in a 2-minute 14, as Robinson heckled Salmond's answer he raised points about how the BBC had obtained market-sensitive information. A report was shown on all BBC evening news programmes later that day as part of which Robinson stated Salmond had not answered his question but had instead chosen to lay accusations against the BBC despite this part being a minority of the exchange. The full exchange was posted many times on social media. The BBC received complaints from viewers over the implication that Salmond had not answered a question put to him; there was a protest in Glasgow, in which between 1000 and 2000 protestors called for Robinson to be sacked. The BBC responded: "The BBC considers that the questions were valid and the overall report balanced and impartial, in line with our editorial guidelines.

In November 2014, Robinson was covering the count of the Rochester and Strood by-election. He was seen smiling while posing for a photograph with Jayda Fransen, candidate and deputy leader of the far-right party Britain First. Robinson denied all connections to Fransen, and later stated that he had assumed she was a staff member at the count seeking a "selfie". It was later reported that Fransen was wearing a prominent badge saying "candidate" at the time.

In October 2019, Robinson was accused by Douglas Murray, a right-wing political commentator, of entrapping him during the Today programme by raising a headline to an article of his from two years earlier.

== Personal life ==
Robinson met his wife, a relationship counsellor, at Oxford University and they married in 1991. They have three children. He lives in Highbury, north London, close to Arsenal's Emirates Stadium, with a second home in Orford, Suffolk. He is a lifelong Manchester United fan, and enjoys sailing and the theatre.

In early 2015, Robinson underwent surgery to remove a bronchial carcinoid tumour; he returned to work at the BBC on 13 April 2015 as part of coverage for the 2015 general election. The operation was reported to have been "a complete success".

== Bibliography ==
- Robinson, Nick. (2012). Live from Downing Street: The Inside Story of Politics, Power and the Media. Bantam Press. ISBN 978-0-593-06680-5
- Robinson, Nick (2015), Election Notebook: The Inside Story of the Battle over Britain's Future and my Personal Battle to Report it. Bantam Press. ISBN 978-0593075180

Media offices
Preceded by John Sergeant	Political Editor: ITN; 2002–2005	Succeeded by Tom Bradby
Preceded by Andrew Marr	Political Editor: BBC News; 2005–2015	Succeeded by Laura Kuenssberg
