= People's PMQs =

Publicity event introduced in 2019

The "People's PMQs" are a social media publicity event introduced in 2019 by Prime Minister Boris Johnson in which pre-selected members of the general public ask the Prime Minister questions during a live video stream on Facebook. In spite of the name, they are not related to the Parliamentary Prime Minister's Questions, As of October 2019, the Prime Minister had released two "People's PMQs".

The "People's PMQs" have been criticised as a "sham" event, and as a way for politicians to avoid press scrutiny. The journalist Nick Robinson has compared the People's PMQs to “a form of propaganda used by dictators down the ages".
