= 1980 Liverpool City Council election =

1980 UK local government election

| ← 1979 | 6 May 1980 | 1982 → |

All 99 seats were up for election followinng boundary changes: three seats for each of the 33 wards. 50 seats needed for a majority

Elections to Liverpool City Council were held on 6 May 1980.

Following boundary changes, the entire council was up for election (3 Councillors for each ward). The candidates with the highest number of votes in each ward were elected until 1984, the candidates with the second highest number of votes were elected until 1983 and the candidates with the third highest number of votes were elected until 1982.

After the election, the composition of the council was:

| Party | Seats; |
|---|---|
| Labour | 40 |
| Liberal | 38 |
| Conservative | 21 |

== Election result ==
Liverpool local election result 1980
| Party | Seats | Gains | Losses | Net gain/loss | Seats % | Votes % | Votes | +/− |
|---|---|---|---|---|---|---|---|---|
| Labour | 40 | | | | 38% | 36% | 51,649 | |
| Liberal | 38 | | | | 40% | 33% | 47,536 | |
| Conservative | 21 | | | | 21% | 29% | 42,512 | |
| Communist | 0 | | | | 0% | 1.0% | 1,473 | |
| Ind. Conservative | 0 | | | | 0% | 0.6% | 821 | |
| Independent Liberal | 0 | | | | 0% | 0.2% | 308 | |

== Ward results ==
* - Councillor seeking re-election

^{(PARTY)} - Party of former Councillor

=== Abercromby ===
Abercromby 3 seats
| Party | Candidate | Votes | % | ±% |
|---|---|---|---|---|
| Liberal | Chris Davies | 2,040 | 54% | N/A |
| Liberal | Alan Troy | 1,696 | 46% | |
| Liberal | David Vasmer | 1,692 | 46% | |
| Labour | Owen Joseph Doyle * | 1,308 | 36% | |
| Labour | Edward Shields * | 1,301 | 36% | |
| Labour | Violet McCoy * | 1,292 | 36% | |
| Communist | Roger o'Hara | 311 | 8% | |
| Conservative | Ian McFall | 132 | 3% | |
| Conservative | Eric Wardle Mossford | 116 | 3% | |
| Conservative | Ernest Peat | 107 | 3% | |
| Majority | | 732 | | |
| Registered electors | | 10,455 | | |
| Turnout | | 3,791 | 36% | |
| Liberal win (new seat) | | | | |
| Liberal win (new seat) | | | | |
| Liberal win (new seat) | | | | |

=== Aigburth ===
Aigburth 3 seats
| Party | Candidate | Votes | % | ±% |
|---|---|---|---|---|
| Liberal | Catherine Hancox | 2,271 | 45% | |
| Liberal | Trevor Jones | 2,266 | 45% | |
| Liberal | Peter Millea | 2,054 | 41% | |
| Conservative | Olga Yvonne Hughes | 2,011 | 40% | |
| Conservative | Paul Davies Gill ^{(PARTY)} | 1,950 | 39% | |
| Conservative | John James Swainbank ^{(PARTY)} | 1,926 | 38% | |
| Labour | Frank Winstanley Longworth | 841 | 17% | |
| Labour | Francis Stanley Roderick | 771 | 15% | |
| Labour | Francis Joseph Wiles | 742 | 15% | |
| Majority | | 260 | | |
| Registered electors | | 13,245 | | |
| Turnout | | 5,062 | 38% | |

=== Allerton ===
Allerton 3 seats
| Party | Candidate | Votes | % | ±% |
|---|---|---|---|---|
| Conservative | Sheila Elizabeth Crane | 3,169 | 61% | |
| Conservative | James Stanislaw Ross * | 2,266 | 61% | |
| Conservative | William Herbert Fearnside * | 3,135 | 60% | |
| Labour | Hilton Robert Brown | 1,092 | 21% | |
| Labour | Michael O'Neill | 1,079 | 21% | |
| Labour | John Henry Stamper | 1,006 | 19% | |
| Liberal | Thomas Henry Harte | 932 | 18% | |
| Liberal | Neville Gordon Chinn | 930 | 18% | |
| Liberal | Yetta Jacobs | 831 | 16% | |
| Majority | | 2,077 | | |
| Registered electors | | 12,660 | | |
| Turnout | | 5,193 | 41% | |

=== Anfield ===
Anfield 3 seats
| Party | Candidate | Votes | % | ±% |
|---|---|---|---|---|
| Conservative | Myra Fitsimmons | 1,660 | 36% | |
| Liberal | Paul Vincent Downes | 1,587 | 34% | |
| Liberal | Catherine Kaufmann | 1,570 | 34% | |
| Liberal | Helen Powell | 1,559 | 34% | |
| Conservative | Thomas Philip Pink | 1,500 | 32% | |
| Conservative | James Hugh Brash | 1,465 | 32% | |
| Labour | David Cowley | 1,373 | 30% | |
| Labour | Thomas McManus | 1,302 | 28% | |
| Labour | Andrew Williams | 1,286 | 28% | |
| Majority | | 73 | | |
| Registered electors | | 12,809 | | |
| Turnout | | 4,620 | 36% | |

=== Arundel ===
Arundel 3 seats
| Party | Candidate | Votes | % | ±% |
|---|---|---|---|---|
| Liberal | Charles Hutchinson * | 1,678 | 37% | |
| Labour | Julie Lyon-Taylor * | 1,580 | 35% | |
| Labour | Patrick Grannell | 1,536 | 34% | |
| Liberal | John Hemmingway | 1,508 | 33% | |
| Liberal | Roger Johnston | 1,506 | 33% | |
| Labour | Ian George Williams | 1,463 | 32% | |
| Conservative | Ronald Spencer Fairclough * | 1,250 | 27% | |
| Conservative | Donald Malcolm Green | 1,166 | 25% | |
| Conservative | Helen Margaret Rigby | 1,049 | 23% | |
| Communist | Rosita Marc | 143 | 3% | |
| Majority | | 170 | | |
| Registered electors | | 12,446 | | |
| Turnout | | 4,579 | 37% | |

=== Breckfield ===
Breckfield 3 seats
| Party | Candidate | Votes | % | ±% |
|---|---|---|---|---|
| Liberal | David Michael Bruce Croft * | 2,367 | 57% | |
| Liberal | Frank McNevin * | 2,318 | 56% | |
| Liberal | William Roberts | 2,173 | 52% | |
| Labour | John Connolly * | 1,307 | 31% | |
| Labour | Philip Howard Rowe | 1,187 | 29% | |
| Labour | Miriam Ann Jones | 1,166 | 28% | |
| Conservative | James Butterfield | 484 | 12% | |
| Conservative | Brian John Hawkins | 376 | 9% | |
| Conservative | Teresa Hawkins | 342 | 8% | |
| Majority | | 1,060 | | |
| Registered electors | | 11,928 | | |
| Turnout | | 4,158 | 35% | |

=== Broadgreen ===
Broadgreen 3 seats
| Party | Candidate | Votes | % | ±% |
|---|---|---|---|---|
| Liberal | Rosemary Cooper * | 2,066 | 42% | |
| Liberal | James Joyce | 1,847 | 37% | |
| Liberal | Geoffrey Smith | 1,766 | 36% | |
| Conservative | Frederick Christopher Burgess | 1,474 | 30% | |
| Labour | David James Minahan | 1,448 | 29% | |
| Labour | Barbara Lucile Walsh | 1,427 | 29% | |
| Labour | John Vincent Walsh | 1,427 | | |
| Conservative | Charles James Lister | 1,416 | 29% | |
| Conservative | Richard Donald Oughton | 1,395 | 28% | |
| Majority | | 592 | | |
| Registered electors | | 13,688 | | |
| Turnout | | 4,941 | 36% | |

=== Childwall ===
Childwall 3 seats
| Party | Candidate | Votes | % | ±% |
|---|---|---|---|---|
| Conservative | William Alan Newton Fearnside * | 2,938 | 50% | |
| Conservative | Mervin Kingston * | 2,896 | 50% | |
| Conservative | Stanley Airey * | 2,881 | 49% | |
| Liberal | Teddy Gold | 2,069 | 35% | |
| Liberal | Edward Richard Goldsmith | 1,964 | 34% | |
| Liberal | William Alan Barton | 1,927 | 33% | |
| Labour | William Edward Bolland | 830 | 14% | |
| Labour | Joyce Elizabeth Edwards | 807 | 14% | |
| Labour | Leslie Evans | 773 | 13% | |
| Majority | | 869 | | |
| Registered electors | | 13,663 | | |
| Turnout | | 5,837 | 43% | |

=== Church ===
Church 3 seats
| Party | Candidate | Votes | % | ±% |
|---|---|---|---|---|
| Conservative | Robert Fryer Symington * | 3,266 | 44% | |
| Liberal | Cyril Eric Carr * | 3,231 | 44% | |
| Conservative | Sally Atherton | 3,148 | 43% | |
| Conservative | Stanley Pickering | 3,044 | 41% | |
| Liberal | Edward Martin Brash | 2,859 | 39% | |
| Liberal | Leonard Tyrer * | 2,832 | 38% | |
| Labour | Robert Julian Clarke | 886 | 12% | |
| Labour | Robert Joseph Quick | 878 | 12% | |
| Labour | David Philip Power | 857 | 12% | |
| Majority | | 35 | | |
| Registered electors | | 15,000 | | |
| Turnout | | 7,383 | 49% | |

=== Clubmoor ===
Clubmoor 3 seats
| Party | Candidate | Votes | % | ±% |
|---|---|---|---|---|
| Liberal | Michael John Storey * | 2,745 | 54% | |
| Liberal | Angela Warburton * | 2,517 | 50% | |
| Liberal | John Bowen | 2,388 | 47% | |
| Labour | William Paul Lafferty | 1,750 | 34% | |
| Labour | Henry Rimmer | 1,738 | 34% | |
| Labour | Alexander Gamble | 1,712 | 34% | |
| Conservative | David Conway | 587 | 12% | |
| Conservative | Stanley Hicklin | 583 | 11% | |
| Conservative | Gertrude Edna McNeill | 560 | 11% | |
| Majority | | 995 | | |
| Registered electors | | 13,768 | | |
| Turnout | | 5,082 | 37% | |

=== County ===
County 3 seats
| Party | Candidate | Votes | % | ±% |
|---|---|---|---|---|
| Liberal | Paul Clark * | 1,961 | 40% | |
| Liberal | Neil Cardwell * | 1,929 | 39% | |
| Labour | Pauline Ann Dunlop * | 1,734 | 35% | |
| Labour | Paul Raymond Kelly | 1,719 | 35% | |
| Liberal | Edith Flanders | 1,684 | 34% | |
| Labour | Walter Frederick Roe | 1,614 | 33% | |
| Conservative | Henry Brown | 1,223 | 25% | |
| Conservative | William Thomas | 1,043 | 21% | |
| Conservative | Charles Peter Loller | 1,032 | 21% | |
| Majority | | 227 | | |
| Registered electors | | 13,531 | | |
| Turnout | | 4,918 | 36% | |

=== Croxteth ===
Croxteth 3 seats
| Party | Candidate | Votes | % | ±% |
|---|---|---|---|---|
| Conservative | Geoffrey Elsmore Brandwoodc * | 2,656 | 53% | |
| Conservative | Frederick Robert Butler * | 2,626 | 52% | |
| Conservative | Ernest Henry Fitzpatrick * | 2,607 | 52% | |
| Labour | Francis Burke | 1,289 | 26% | |
| Labour | John Mooney | 1,109 | 22% | |
| Liberal | Ivan Clews | 1,089 | 22% | |
| Labour | Alfred Clifford Swannell | 1,064 | 21% | |
| Liberal | Thomas Richard Jones | 1,035 | 21% | |
| Liberal | Eileen Margaret Clews | 1,018 | 20% | |
| Majority | | 1,367 | | |
| Registered electors | | 13,040 | | |
| Turnout | | 5,034 | 39% | |

=== Dingle ===
Dingle 3 seats
| Party | Candidate | Votes | % | ±% |
|---|---|---|---|---|
| Liberal | Richard Charles Kemp | 1,929 | 44% | |
| Liberal | Lisa Jones | 1,881 | 43% | |
| Liberal | Charles Collins | 1,734 | 39% | |
| Labour | Mabel Evans * | 1,684 | 38% | |
| Labour | Roy Stoddart * | 1,606 | 36% | |
| Labour | Sydney Wynne Jones * | 1,490 | 34% | |
| Conservative | David Walter Patmore | 689 | 16% | |
| Conservative | Julie Margaret Shaw | 675 | 15% | |
| Conservative | John Astley Watson | 650 | 15% | |
| Communist | James Greig | 110 | 2.5% | |
| Majority | | 245 | | |
| Registered electors | | 11,800 | | |
| Turnout | | 4,412 | 37% | |

=== Dovecot ===
Dovecot 3 seats
| Party | Candidate | Votes | % | ±% |
|---|---|---|---|---|
| Labour | Edward Burke * | 2,469 | 67% | |
| Labour | Wilfred Patrick Johnson * | 2,432 | 66% | |
| Labour | William Henry Westbury * | 2,394 | 65% | |
| Conservative | John Leslie Walsh | 940 | 26% | |
| Conservative | Harold Glover | 921 | 25% | |
| Conservative | William John Turner | 805 | 22% | |
| Liberal | Daphne Cookson Turner | 271 | 7% | |
| Liberal | William John Cooper | 254 | 7% | |
| Liberal | Elizabeth Valerie Higgins | 183 | 5% | |
| Majority | | 1,529 | | |
| Registered electors | | 11,893 | | |
| Turnout | | 3,680 | 31% | |

=== Everton ===
Everton 3 seats
| Party | Candidate | Votes | % | ±% |
|---|---|---|---|---|
| Labour | James Parry * | 1,530 | 68% | |
| Labour | Dominic Brady ^{(PARTY)} | 1,347 | 60% | |
| Labour | James Edward Walker * | 1,306 | 58% | |
| Liberal | Kevin Andrew Sewill | 451 | 20% | |
| Liberal | Peter O'Neill | 437 | 19% | |
| Liberal | William Barrow | 415 | 18% | |
| Conservative | David John Lewis | 195 | 9% | |
| Conservative | Gerard Widdows | 116 | 5% | |
| Communist | Robert Cartwright | 83 | 3.7% | |
| Majority | | 1,079 | | |
| Registered electors | | 10,870 | | |
| Turnout | | 2,259 | 21% | |

=== Fazakerley ===
Fazakerley 3 seats
| Party | Candidate | Votes | % | ±% |
|---|---|---|---|---|
| Labour | David John Lloyd * | 2,026 | 50% | |
| Labour | John Philip Prince | 1,812 | 45% | |
| Labour | Robert Charles Gregory | 1,804 | 45% | |
| Conservative | Tina Myrtle Gould | 1,260 | 31% | |
| Conservative | Albert Brown * | 1,170 | 29% | |
| Conservative | Edwin Marshall Clein | 1,087 | 27% | |
| Liberal | Harold Glyn Rogers * | 741 | 18% | |
| Liberal | John George Morgan | 719 | 18% | |
| Liberal | Alan Moulton | 709 | 18% | |
| Majority | | 766 | | |
| Registered electors | | 11,893 | | |
| Turnout | | 4,027 | 34% | |

=== Gillmoss ===
Gillmoss 3 seats
| Party | Candidate | Votes | % | ±% |
|---|---|---|---|---|
| Labour | Edward Deakin Roderick * | 2,181 | 76% | |
| Labour | Peter John Murphy * | 2,112 | 73% | |
| Labour | William Ralph Snell *' | 1,978 | 69% | |
| Conservative | Alfred Gore | 456 | 16% | |
| Conservative | Pauline Dougherty | 434 | 15% | |
| Conservative | William Edward Brown | 413 | 14% | |
| Liberal | June Jones | 245 | 9% | |
| Liberal | Marguerite Dagny Bridge | 231 | 8% | |
| Liberal | Audrey May Loughney | 199 | 7% | |
| Majority | | 1,725 | | |
| Registered electors | | 12,029 | | |
| Turnout | | 2,882 | 24% | |

=== Granby ===
Granby 3 seats
| Party | Candidate | Votes | % | ±% |
|---|---|---|---|---|
| Labour | Alexander Doswell * | 1,910 | 52% | |
| Labour | John Dunstan Hamilton * | 1,805 | 49% | |
| Labour | David Raymond Leach ^{(PARTY)} | 1,649 | 45% | |
| Liberal | Arthur Eric Damsell | 1,162 | 32% | |
| Liberal | Adrian Michael Bell | 969 | 26% | |
| Liberal | Jeffrey Lamb | 921 | 25% | |
| Conservative | Arthur Palin | 478 | 13% | |
| Conservative | William Thomas | 442 | 12% | |
| Conservative | Edward John Donald Williams | 441 | 12% | |
| Communist | Jack Kay | 10 | 3.4% | |
| Majority | | 748 | | |
| Registered electors | | 11,964 | | |
| Turnout | | 3,674 | 31% | |

=== Grassendale ===
Grassendale 3 seats
| Party | Candidate | Votes | % | ±% |
|---|---|---|---|---|
| Conservative | John Harold Lea | 3,464 | 55% | |
| Conservative | Thomas Lyrian Hobday | 3,443 | 54% | |
| Conservative | Ernest Francis Pine | 3,312 | 52% | |
| Liberal | Gerard Patrick Scott | 1,268 | 20% | |
| Liberal | Iris Hilda Rothwell | 1,203 | 19% | |
| Liberal | Barbara Kemp | 1,149 | 18% | |
| Ind. Conservative | Kenneth Bruce Jacques | 821 | 13% | |
| Labour | Alfred Vincent Rule | 791 | 12% | |
| Labour | Elizabeth Frances Kingdom | 737 | 12% | |
| Labour | Keith John Connolly | 700 | 11% | |
| Majority | | 2,196 | | |
| Registered electors | | 12,305 | | |
| Turnout | | 6,344 | 52% | |

=== Kensington ===
Kensington 3 seats
| Party | Candidate | Votes | % | ±% |
|---|---|---|---|---|
| Liberal | Francis Joseph Doran * | 2,806 | 71% | |
| Liberal | Graham Hulme ^{(PARTY)} | 2,637 | 67% | |
| Liberal | Joyce Grace Stephenson ^{(PARTY)} | 2,567 | 65% | |
| Labour | Leonard Ashworth | 737 | 19% | |
| Labour | Vincent Peter Hyams | 724 | 18% | |
| Labour | Glynn George Pratt | 707 | 18% | |
| Conservative | Mary Davis | 408 | 10% | |
| Conservative | David Evans | 401 | 10% | |
| Conservative | Robert James Wilson | 360 | 9% | |
| Majority | | 2,069 | | |
| Registered electors | | 12,254 | | |
| Turnout | | 3,951 | 32% | |

=== Melrose ===
Melrose 3 seats
| Party | Candidate | Votes | % | ±% |
|---|---|---|---|---|
| Labour | William Lafferty * | 1,855 | 65% | |
| Labour | William Francis Burke ^{(PARTY)} | 1,692 | 59% | |
| Labour | Michael George Dalling ^{(PARTY)} | 1,399 | 49% | |
| Liberal | Annetta McDonnell | 491 | 17% | |
| Liberal | Steven Loughney | 481 | 17% | |
| Liberal | Ronald Joseph Taylor | 444 | 16% | |
| Conservative | Julie Ann Carpenter | 416 | 15% | |
| Conservative | Daniel Gerard Dougherty | 407 | 14% | |
| Conservative | Frank Oldham | 355 | 12% | |
| People's | James Joseph Hasting | 96 | 3.4% | |
| People's | Maureen Owens | 95 | 3.3% | |
| People's | Helen Barlow | 90 | 3.1% | |
| Majority | | 1,364 | | |
| Registered electors | | 11,308 | | |
| Turnout | | 2,858 | 25% | |

=== Netherley ===
Netherley
| Party | Candidate | Votes | % | ±% |
|---|---|---|---|---|
| Labour | Margaret Rose Delaney * | 2,003 | 69% | |
| Labour | Derek Anthony Hatton * | 1,979 * | 68% | |
| Labour | Heather Bryers * | 1,894 | 65% | |
| Conservative | James Connor | 522 | 18% | |
| Conservative | James Anthony Dougherty | 486 | 17% | |
| Conservative | William David Henry | 458 | 16% | |
| Liberal | Audrey Elsie Ralph | 239 | 8% | |
| Liberal | Mary Stubbs | 213 | 7% | |
| Liberal | Owen Henry Williams | 212 | 7% | |
| Communist | Brian O'Keefe | 148 | 5.1% | |
| Majority | | 1,481 | | |
| Registered electors | | 9,365 | | |
| Turnout | | 2,912 | 31% | |

=== Old Swan ===
Old Swan 3 seats
| Party | Candidate | Votes | % | ±% |
|---|---|---|---|---|
| Labour | Peter Joseph Lloyd * | 1,743 | 36% | |
| Liberal | Josephine Smith | 1,725 | 36% | |
| Liberal | Francis Richard Haywood | 1,603 | 33% | |
| Liberal | Peter Mahon * | 1,586 | 33% | |
| Labour | Jane Ann Hollinshead | 1,514 | 31% | |
| Labour | Michael Joseph Smith | 1,405 | 29% | |
| Conservative | William Henry Connolly | 1,053 | 22% | |
| Conservative | Donald Ellis | 1,022 | 21% | |
| Conservative | Alan Graham Wilson | 931 | 19% | |
| Independent Liberal | Keith McCullough | 308 | 6.4% | |
| Independent Liberal | William John McCullough | 293 | 6.1% | |
| Communist | Harry Mohin | 127 | 2.6% | |
| Majority | | 18 | | |
| Registered electors | | 12,292 | | |
| Turnout | | 4,829 | 39% | |

=== Picton ===
Picton
| Party | Candidate | Votes | % | ±% |
|---|---|---|---|---|
| Liberal | Pamela Bradley * | 3,471 | 67% | |
| Liberal | John Bradley ^{(PARTY)} | 3,461 | 67% | |
| Liberal | Herbert Edward Herrity * | 3,202 | 62% | |
| Labour | Graham John Barrett | 1,164 | 22% | |
| Labour | Ernest Albert Taylor | 1,131 | 22% | |
| Labour | John Swarbrooke | 1,034 | 20% | |
| Conservative | Iain Sutherland Picton | 405 | 7.8% | |
| Conservative | Felicity Anne Hopkin | 403 | 7.8% | |
| Conservative | Hugh Robert Johnston | 394 | 7.6% | |
| Communist | John Gilbert Volleamere | 151 | 2.9% | |
| Majority | | 2,307 | | |
| Registered electors | | 11,719 | | |
| Turnout | | 5,191 | 44% | |

=== Pirrie ===
Pirrie 3 seats
| Party | Candidate | Votes | % | ±% |
|---|---|---|---|---|
| Labour | Hugh Dalton * | 2,884 | 62% | |
| Labour | Michael Black * | 2,587 | 56% | |
| Labour | Peter Owens * | 2,374 | 51% | |
| Conservative | Muriel May Brown | 1,067 | 23% | |
| Conservative | Christine Perkins | 887 | 19% | |
| Conservative | Joan Mary Wright | 848 | 18% | |
| Liberal | Thomas Owen | 665 | 14% | |
| Liberal | Charles Mayes | 508 | 11% | |
| Liberal | Marion Josephine Cardwell | 482 | 10% | |
| Majority | | 1,817 | | |
| Registered electors | | 12,054 | | |
| Turnout | | 4,616 | 38% | |

=== St. Mary's ===
St. Mary's
| Party | Candidate | Votes | % | ±% |
|---|---|---|---|---|
| Labour | Edward Loyden | 2,351 | 56% | |
| Labour | Stanley Ronald Maddox * | 2,089 | 50% | |
| Labour | Robert Charles Evans | 2,039 | 49% | |
| Conservative | Elizabeth Foster | 1,319 | 32% | |
| Conservative | Derek Raymond Hawes | 1,280 | 31% | |
| Conservative | Robert Albert Parkes | 1,249 | 30% | |
| Liberal | Philip James Message | 301 | 7.2% | |
| Liberal | Georgina May Owen | 291 | 7.0% | |
| Liberal | James Martin Loughney | 277 | 6.6% | |
| Communist | John Malcolm McQueen | 199 | 4.8% | |
| Majority | | 1,032 | | |
| Registered electors | | 12,745 | | |
| Turnout | | 4,170 | 33% | |

=== Smithdown ===
Smithdown
| Party | Candidate | Votes | % | ±% |
|---|---|---|---|---|
| Liberal | Anne Clitherow | 2,130 | 56% | |
| Liberal | Joseph Sydney Clitherow | 2,046 | 54% | |
| Liberal | Ernest Richard Stephenson | 1,949 | 51% | |
| Labour | Peter Thomas Devaney | 1,391 | 37% | |
| Labour | Paul Herbert Gray | 1,240 | 33% | |
| Labour | Joseph Stanton | 1,239 | 33% | |
| Conservative | John Atherton | 285 | 7.5% | |
| Conservative | James McDermott | 234 | 6.1% | |
| Conservative | Rolland Louis Zollner | 129 | 3.4% | |
| Majority | | 739 | | |
| Registered electors | | 11,095 | | |
| Turnout | | 3,806 | 34% | |

=== Speke ===
Speke
| Party | Candidate | Votes | % | ±% |
|---|---|---|---|---|
| Labour | George Joseph Maudsley * | 2,005 | 75% | |
| Labour | Kenneth McKenzie Stewart * | 1,877 | 70% | |
| Labour | John McLean * | 1,833 | 69% | |
| Conservative | Thomas Morrison | 524 | 20% | |
| Conservative | Ann Nugent | 409 | 15% | |
| Conservative | Edward Gordon Shaw | 407 | 15% | |
| Liberal | Susan Jean Downes | 134 | 5.0% | |
| Liberal | Eileen Dunlop | 130 | 4.9% | |
| Liberal | Veronica Margaret Best | 122 | 4.6% | |
| Majority | | 1,871 | | |
| Registered electors | | 10,168 | | |
| Turnout | | 2,663 | 26% | |

=== Tuebrook ===
Tuebrook
| Party | Candidate | Votes | % | ±% |
|---|---|---|---|---|
| Liberal | Robert Gore | 2,467 | 47% | |
| Liberal | John Thomas Jones | 2,147 | 41% | |
| Liberal | Richard Pine | 2,210 | 42% | |
| Labour | John Eric Roberts * | 1,414 | 27% | |
| Conservative | John Irving * | 1,362 | 26% | |
| Labour | Terence McDonald | 1,311 | 25% | |
| Labour | Kathleen Margaret Mary Coombes | 1,186 | 23% | |
| Conservative | William Scott | 1,083 | 21% | |
| Conservative | Eric Lloyd | 1,077 | 21% | |
| Majority | | 1,053 | | |
| Registered electors | | 12,449 | | |
| Turnout | | 5,243 | 42% | |

=== Valley ===
Valley
| Party | Candidate | Votes | % | ±% |
|---|---|---|---|---|
| Labour | Henry Smith | 1,923 | 54% | |
| Labour | Anthony John Byrne | 1,882 | 53% | |
| Labour | Terence Harrison | 1,863 | 53% | |
| Conservative | Stephen Fitzsimmons | 999 | 28% | |
| Conservative | Susan Elizabeth Byrom | 988 | 28% | |
| Conservative | Stephen Richard Marsden | 931 | 26% | |
| Liberal | Henry Ronald Jones | 625 | 18% | |
| Liberal | Marie Fox | 622 | 18% | |
| Liberal | Edward Jameson | 620 | 17% | |
| Majority | | 924 | | |
| Registered electors | | 10,501 | | |
| Turnout | | 3,547 | 34% | |

=== Vauxhall ===
Vauxhall
| Party | Candidate | Votes | % | ±% |
|---|---|---|---|---|
| Labour | Paul Orr * | 1,726 | 76% | |
| Labour | Anthony Dunford * | 1,668 | 73% | |
| Labour | Joseph Morgan * | 1,657 | 73% | |
| Liberal | Thomas Vincent Browne | 385 | 17% | |
| Liberal | Stephen Richard Radford | 352 | 15% | |
| Liberal | Grahame Young | 301 | 13% | |
| Conservative | Charles Edward Jennings | 88 | 3.4% | |
| Conservative | Thomas Stockdale | 80 | 3.5% | |
| Conservative | Charles Edwin Thorne | 77 | 3.4% | |
| Communist | William Albertina | 77 | 3.4% | |
| Majority | | 1,341 | | |
| Registered electors | | 9,306 | | |
| Turnout | | 2,276 | 24% | |

=== Warbreck ===
Warbreck
| Party | Candidate | Votes | % | ±% |
|---|---|---|---|---|
| Conservative | Ronald Gould | 1,849 | 38% | |
| Conservative | Reginald Bernard Flude * | 1,811 | 37% | |
| Conservative | Ian Brown | 1,681 | 35% | |
| Liberal | Joseph Lang * | 1,525 | 31% | |
| Labour | Paul John Summerfeld * | 1,486 | 31% | |
| Liberal | Elsie Joan Lang | 1,447 | 30% | |
| Liberal | Richard John Roberts | 1,393 | 29% | |
| Labour | Peter Francis McAllister | 1,386 | 29% | |
| Labour | Joseph Aidan Devaney | 1,345 | 28% | |
| Majority | | 324 | | |
| Registered electors | | 13,086 | | |
| Turnout | | 4,860 | 37% | |

=== Woolton ===
Woolton
| Party | Candidate | Votes | % | ±% |
|---|---|---|---|---|
| Conservative | Ruth Dean * | 3,883 | 72% | |
| Conservative | Anthony McVeigh | 3,798 | 71% | |
| Conservative | Christopher Geoffrey Hallows | 3,770 | 70% | |
| Labour | Philip Richard Martin | 1,010 | 19% | |
| Labour | Owen McDonough | 998 | 19% | |
| Labour | David Alan Bradbury | 923 | 17% | |
| Liberal | Philip Martin Freeman | 469 | 9% | |
| Liberal | Richard Powell | 438 | 8% | |
| Liberal | Ann Ryan | 423 | 8% | |
| Majority | | 2,873 | | |
| Registered electors | | 12,808 | | |
| Turnout | | 5,362 | 42% | |
