= YMD (disambiguation) =

YMD usually refers to the Gregorian year-month-day date format.

YMD may also refer to:

- Muda language, the ISO 639-3 code ymd
- Mould Bay Airport, the former IATA code YMD
- YMD, the former ISO 3166-1 code for Yemen, Democratic
- Youth for Multilateral Disarmament, a campaigning organisation set up by the National Young Conservatives
