= North Bedfordshire =

North Bedfordshire may refer to the following administrative units in Bedfordshire, England:

- North Bedfordshire (UK Parliament constituency)
- Borough of Bedford, known as North Bedfordshire from 1975 to 1992
