= Youth for Multilateral Disarmament =

Youth for Multilateral Disarmament was a campaigning organisation set up by the National Young Conservatives to counter Campaign for Nuclear Disarmament (CND) activities with young voters. The National Chairman of the Young Conservatives, Iain Picton, tasked Vice Chairman, Phil Pedley with the creation of a front organisation to highlight the perceived naivety of unilateral disarmament given the hostile nature of the Soviet Union and the Warsaw Pact. The campaign included support for the siting of cruise missiles in the UK to counter Soviet SS 20 missiles.

In the 1980s, CND enjoyed a significant revival. The deployment of SS20s in the Soviet Bloc countries led to a counter positioning of American Cruise Pershing II missiles in Western Europe, including Britain which led to a huge growth in CND membership.

== Liaison with Ministry of Defence ==
Pedley liaised with John Nott, Minister of Defence and Nott's PPS, David Hunt MP to agree the scope and nature of the organisation which included monitoring CND activity across the country, the training of anti-CND activists and the production of anti-CND material. Pedley informed the Young Conservative National Advisory Committee. "I have personally assured John Nott MP, that the YC's will discuss the matter fully with him, and that any YC campaign will be thoroughly thought out and he will be kept informed of our activities throughout the year".

== Countering Youth CND activity in the Young Conservatives ==
Picton and Pedley moved to counter Youth CND activity in Young Conservative Branches. The CND Magazine Sanity, claimed; "Meanwhile, support for CND amongst Tories has been growing. CND has been invited to dozens of Young Tory meetings in London and the South East, and at least one Young Tory branch has donated funds to CND's limited funds". Pedley arranged for the offending YC branch to be closed down. Sanity quoted Pedley as admitting some YC's supported CND but, "there are none on the National Executive".

== Officers ==
Pedley became the first Director/Chairman of YMD with Mark Worrall (the Young Conservative National Organiser) acting as the General Secretary. When Pedley succeeded Picton as National YC Chairman, he appointed Nick Robinson as Director/Chairman as his successor at YMD. The address was given as 1a Whitehall Place London SW1 National YC Report 1982–83. Subsequent directors included Richard Thomas, who led a very successful UK delegation to NATO headquarters in Brussels.

== Campaigns and material ==
YMD produced a range of stickers, posters and leaflets highlighting the risk of unilateral disarmament. Materials included:

=== Peace and Defence – Speakers Notes ===
A comprehensive range of information to assist speakers debating at public meetings or appearing on media outlets. Written by Pedley and revamped by Robinson in 1985.

=== Peace at what price? - Never Again ===
A 1985 poster highlighting the perceived dangers of appeasement and featuring concentration camp victims.

=== The Soviet Union Needs You - Support Unilateral Disarmament ===
A leaflet warning that unilateral disarmament would give the Soviet Union a military advantage and leave liberal democracies weakened and unable to resist encroachment.

== Demise ==
The re-election of a Conservative government in 1983, threw the CND on the defensive and the defeat of left-wing parties in continental Europe "made the deployment of Cruise missiles inevitable and the movement again began to lose steam".
