= Mohammad Yasin (politician) =

British Labour Party politician

Mohammad Yasin MP
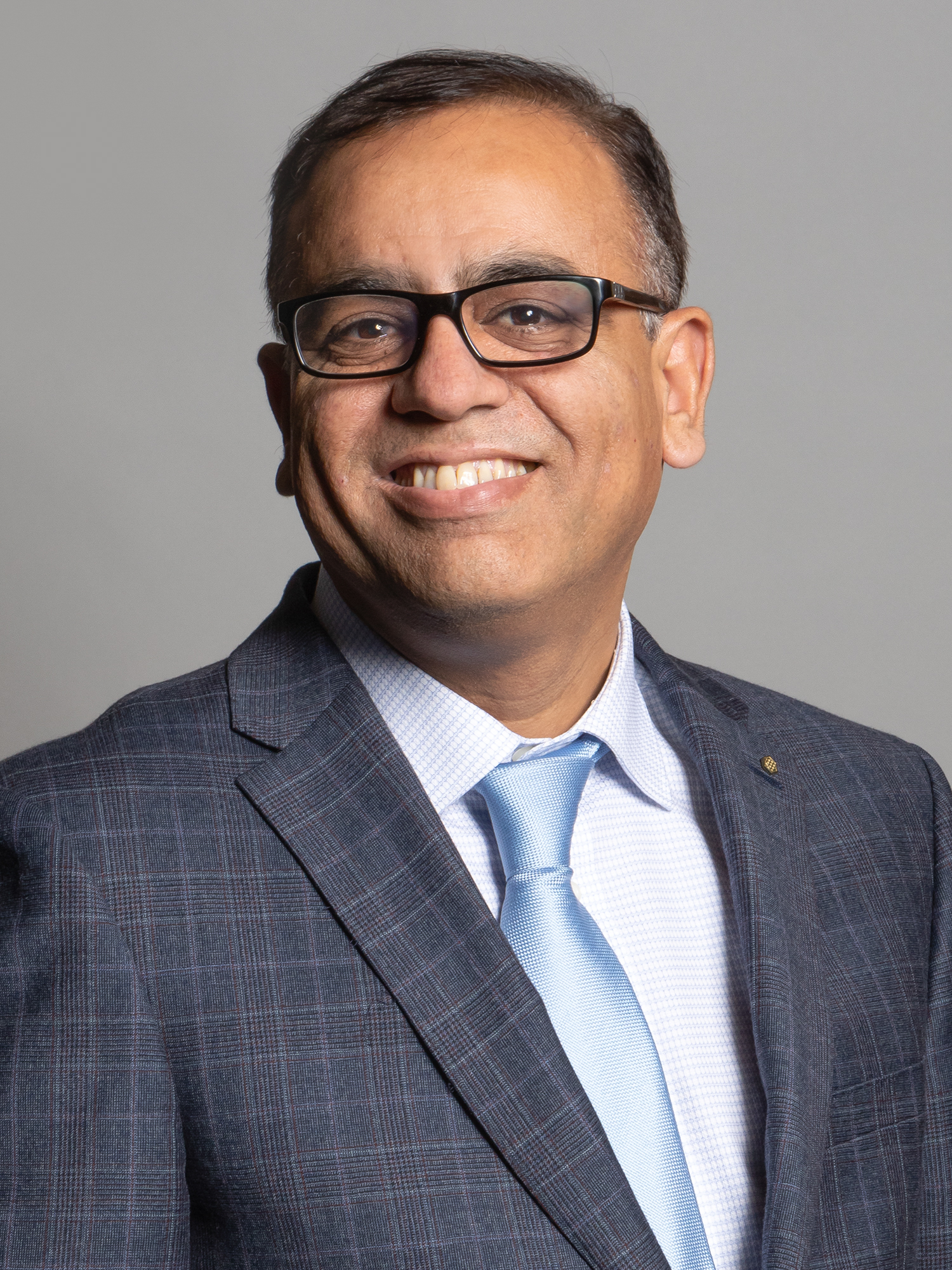
- Official portrait, 2020

Member of Parliament for Bedford
- Incumbent
- Assumed office 8 June 2017
- Preceded by: Richard Fuller
- Majority: 9,430 (23.2%)

Member of Bedford Borough Council for Queens Park
- In office 4 May 2006 – 2 May 2019
- Preceded by: Frank Garrick
- Succeeded by: Nesreen Akhtar

Personal details
- Born: 1 October 1971 (age 55) Mirpur, Azad Kashmir, Pakistan
- Party: Labour
- Website: Official website

Mohammad Yasin (Urdu: محمد یاسین; born 1 October 1971) is a Pakistani-born British politician serving as Member of Parliament (MP) for Bedford since 2017. A member of the Labour Party, he was a Member of Bedford Borough Council from 2006 to 2019.

== Early and personal life ==
Yasin was born on 1 October 1971 in Mirpur, Pakistan. His father was a truck driver. He obtained a Bachelor of Commerce degree from Degree College Mirpur. Yasin moved to Bedford, Bedfordshire at the age of 21. He reports that his first job on arrival was in a factory before becoming a taxi driver. While working at the factory, he became involved with trade unions, and joined the Labour Party. Yasin is married and is the father of four children.

In 2006, he was elected as a councillor for Queen's Park ward in Bedford Borough Council. Yasin was re-elected in 2009 and 2015. Upon being elected to Parliament, he continued to serve as a Bedford Borough Councillor until the 2019 local elections when he stood down. He held the Adult Services portfolio on the Council.

== Parliamentary career ==
Yasin was elected as MP for Bedford in the 2017 general election with a majority of 789 (1.6%) votes. It was previously represented in parliament by Conservative Richard Fuller since 2010. In March 2018, Yasin received a suspicious package containing an Islamophobic letter and sticky liquid. The substance was later found to be harmless. Similar packages were received by fellow Muslim Labour MPs Rushanara Ali, Afzal Khan and Rupa Huq.

Yasin supported the UK remaining within the European Union (EU) in the 2016 UK EU membership referendum. In the indicative votes on 27 March 2019, Yasin voted for a referendum on a Brexit withdrawal agreement, for the Norway-plus model, and for a customs union with the EU.

Since May 2019, Yasin has sat on the Levelling Up, Housing and Communities Committee.

In the 2019 general election, Yasin was re-elected as MP for Bedford. He defeated his closest Conservative challenger, Ryan Henson, by a margin of 145 votes (0.3%), making Bedford the most marginal Labour-held seat in the United Kingdom in that election. In 2024 Yasin was reelected with an increased majority of almost 10,000.

Parliament of the United Kingdom
Preceded by Richard Fuller	Member of Parliament for Bedford; 2017–present	Incumbent
