= Impact (conservative magazine) =

British conservative news magazine (1964–1969)

- Categories: News magazine
- Publisher: Conservative and Unionist Central Office
- Founded: 1964
- First issue: Winter 1964
- Final issue: Spring 1969
- Country: England
- Based in: London
- Language: English

Impact was the official media outlet of the Young Conservatives in the United Kingdom. The magazine existed between 1964 and 1969 and was headquartered in London.

== History and profile ==
Impact was launched in 1964, and its first issue dated Winter 1964. In the first issue the magazine declared itself as the official publication of the Young Conservatives, and its subtitle was the Young Conservative news magazine. The publisher of Impact was Conservative and Unionist Central Office based in London.

The magazine featured both news and editorials. Alec Douglas-Home published articles in Impact one of which was a discussion of modernization in regard to the British industrialization. As of 1967 one of the contributors was Robert Worley. Its circulation was about 10,000 copies. Impact folded following the publication of the issue dated Spring 1969.
