= The Street That Cut Everything =

Coordinates: 53°46′58″N 2°43′15″W

- Genre: Current affairs
- Presented by: Nick Robinson
- Country of origin: United Kingdom

Production
- Executive producers: Ricky Kelehar; Ewan Keil
- Producer: Oliver Wilson
- Running time: 90 minutes

Original release
- Network: BBC One
- Release: 16 May 2011

The Street That Cut Everything is a British television documentary presented by BBC political editor Nick Robinson. Billed as a social experiment, 50 residents of a street in Preston, Lancashire were persuaded to go without all council services for six weeks, and work together to run their own community with the aid of the Council Tax rebates they received for not having local authority services. One of the film's objectives was to highlight the issue of cuts in public spending, but the programme attracted criticism for the nature in which the experiment was conducted. One major point of concern involved dogs being allowed to excessively foul the street, which the residents were then required to clean up, something which raised public health concerns. The programme was aired in two episodes on Monday 16 May 2011.

== Background ==
Details of the programme were reported in January 2011, with the documentary's intentions being to discover what would happen to an "ordinary residential road". It would see residents having to live without refuse collection, street lighting and street cleaning, and the Daily Telegraph reported that to emphasize their point, the show's producers had brought about 20 dogs to the street then encouraged their owners to let them foul the road.

The film's objective was to highlight issues regarding the cuts to public spending being implemented by the Conservative-led coalition government and the effects these might have on the provision of local services. Speaking about the documentary at the time, a spokesman for the BBC said: "This programme will explore how a community faces up to the choices involved in living in an era of cuts, and examine the way in which people act as a group when confronted with limited resources and difficult decisions."

The street featured in the programme is Beacon Avenue, Fulwood, Preston. During the show Beacon Avenue was however renamed The Street.

== Overview ==
BBC Political editor Nick Robinson persuaded the 50 residents of the street to forgo all council services for six weeks, excluding education and healthcare, and the neighbours were required to arrange alternative solutions. The residents received a "rebate" for the equivalent amount of Council Tax which they would be paying over the six weeks, and had to work together as a community. During the period of the experiment, refuse was no longer collected, street lighting was switched off and other services provided by the local authority were withdrawn. To make life more difficult the programme arranged for the street to be daubed with graffiti, for items to be fly tipped, for dogs to foul pavements and for actors to pose as anti-social teenagers who the neighbours were required to deal with. In addition some residents had to depend on the community as a whole for their benefits.

== Criticism ==
The programme attracted controversy several months before it was finally broadcast, with the dog fouling incident coming in for particular criticism. Dorothy Kelk, speaking on behalf of the Preston branch of Friends of the Earth, said the BBC had been "extremely irresponsible", adding: "Dog excrement fouling a road is unhygienic and can cause illness in young children." On the same issue, Ken Hudson, the Conservative leader of Preston City Council, said: "I think we have sufficient problems trying to regulate people to collect dog droppings without artificially manufacturing a programme which causes effluent on the streets." But defending the scene, a BBC spokesman said: "The filming of the dog-walking scene demonstrates in exaggerated form one of the challenges residents would face if street-cleaning services were cut. The residents rose to the challenge and cleaned up the small amount of dog dirt extremely quickly."

Conservative MP Stephen Hammond said: "This is an outrageous piece of scaremongering by the BBC and compromises their editorial integrity...We need a full and frank explanation from the organisation about how and why this is a good use of taxpayers' cash...I shall be reporting them to Ofcom [the broadcasting watchdog] for what quite frankly is an unforgivable breach of editorial standards."

== Reception ==
The website Digital Spy reported that the first part of the programme, which was aired from 9-10pm had attracted 3.02million viewers (a 12.7% audience share), but that it had been beaten by ITV1's documentary on Strangeways Prison which achieved viewing figures of 5.25m (22.1%). The second episode of The Street That Cut Everything, shown after the BBC Ten O'Clock News attracted 3.02 million (by then a 21.1% share of the audience).

Reviews of the programme were generally unfavourable with critics citing its lack of credibility. John Crace of The Guardian wrote: "Government cuts as entertainment is both morally and factually iffy...In the end we didn't actually learn that much about what councils can and cannot afford or whether they offer good value for money; only that they manage it better than a bunch of 50 amateurs trying to do it on their own. But we did learn why the big society is probably a doomed project."

Writing in the Daily Telegraph, Catherine Gee called the programme "one of the most pointless political and social experiments of recent times", observing: "In order to find out what happens when there’s no public services we need look no further than the local library or a history documentary. It’s squalor and chaos and that’s why public services were introduced in the first place. The issue of cuts to public services is indeed a serious one, but this sensationalist documentary was not an effective way to highlight it."

A more positive review was given by Archie Bland, of The Independent who wrote: "It's the first piece of popular television I've seen that grapples effectively with how such deep cuts will really play out."
