= Brian Parkyn =

Member of Parliament for Bedford
- In office 31 March 1966 – 29 May 1970
- Preceded by: Christopher Soames
- Succeeded by: Trevor Skeet

Personal details
- Born: Brian Stewart Parkyn; 28 April 1923
- Died: 22 March 2006 (aged 82)
- Party: Labour
- Occupation: Politician

Brian Stewart Parkyn (28 April 1923 – 22 March 2006) was a British Labour Party politician.

== Early years ==
Parkyn was educated at King Edward VI Grammar School, Chelmsford, and at technical colleges. Like his father, Leslie Parkyn, in the First World War, he was a conscientious objector in the Second World War.

== Career ==
He joined his uncle in the firm of Scott Bader, becoming a director in 1953. He was a council member of the British Plastics Federation.

Parkyn was elected Member of Parliament for Bedford in 1966, having first contested the seat in 1964, and ousting Christopher Soames, son-in-law of Sir Winston Churchill by a narrow majority. He notably served on the House of Commons Select Committee on Science and Technology. In 1970 he lost his seat to the Conservative Trevor Skeet; he attempted unsuccessfully to regain the seat in October 1974.

Parliament of the United Kingdom
Preceded by Christopher Soames	Member of Parliament for Bedford; 1966–1970	Succeeded by Trevor Skeet
