= John Guthrie (politician) =

John Guthrie is a British political activist formerly involved in the youth section of the Conservative Party and a former employee of Conservative Central Office. He has been active in Bedford politics and run for mayoral office.

== Young Conservatives ==
Guthrie joined Luton Young Conservatives in the early eighties and rose to be National vice-chairman (1982/4). He worked closely with National chairman Phil Pedley to counter extremism and spoke against Harvey Proctor MP in the balloted motion on Immigration at the 1983 Party Conference. He co-ordinated the Young Conservative/BBC poll of delegates that showed most attendees did not support the extreme views promoted at the conference by the Monday Club.

He became National Chairman of the Young Conservatives in 1984 as the moderate (wets) candidate. The Guardian reported: "Mr Guthrie represents the dominant wet wing of the YC's was elected as national chairman in a ballot last week by a convincing majority of 222 to 81 over his right-wing rival, Mr Colin Jackson."

=== YC Report into Right Wing Infiltration & Extremism ===
As a member of the Young Conservatives Committee on Extremist Infiltration, in 1983/84 he continued to support the Final Report and the Panorama programme after Pedley's Chairmanship term ended. Despite pressure from the Party chairman, John Selwyn Gummer, Guthrie remained steadfast. The Times reported: "... in an astonishing intervention which would have been wholly unwelcome to the party chairman," he referred to "the strange antics," of Conservative Central Office in "orchestrating" an attack against the Panorama programme. Guthrie warned Gummer, the Party was fostering the impression that it would not act on extremist infiltration. "It is therefore disturbing to see that some have seen fit to undermine our work in this area by challenging the basis of this programme." Guthrie warned the Party chairman, that the Young Conservatives would continue to speak out on the issue of extremists.

"We are not prepared to see the strange antics of Central Office deflect us from our commitment to the Report or its recommendations. If it transpires that we are the only section of the Party that is prepared to place principle over convenience in this respect, then we are fully prepared to accept that role."

The Party acted on Guthrie's call to comb the Party for extremists. Sir Russell Sanderson, Chairman of the voluntary party announced steps to tighten selection procedures at al levels. And in March the Party vice-chairman in charge of Candidates, David Hunt MP, announced plans to comb the files for extremists. The YC's remained unhappy two key recommendations were not adopted: the creation of a permanent monitoring unit and the countering of extreme groups on the fringe of the party.

Guthrie was succeeded by fellow moderate, Richard Fuller as National Chairman of the Young Conservatives in February 1985.

== Tory Reform Group ==
In 1988 Guthrie became National Chairman of the One Nation leaning Tory Reform Group, overseeing a revamp of the organisation and finishing his term in 1991.

== Parliamentary and European Elections ==
The 1992 General election saw him standing as the Conservative candidate against Greville Janner (Labour) in Leicester West. From 1992–94, he directed the Conservative Party's International Office at Conservative Central Office and ran the party's 1994 European Elections Campaign.

General Election 1992: Leicester West
Party	Candidate	Votes	%	±%
Labour	Greville Janner	22,574	46.8	+2.3
Conservative	John A. Guthrie	18,596	38.5	−3.5
Liberal Democrats	Geoffrey F. Walker	6,402	13.3	−0.2
Green	Miss Claire D. Wintram	517	1.1	+1.1
Natural Law	Mrs Jenny M. Rosta	171	0.4	+0.4
Majority		3,978	8.2	+5.8
Turnout		48,260	73.7	+0.2
Labour hold		Swing	+2.9	

== Local activism ==
In 2010, Guthrie won the ballot to run as the Conservative Candidate in the 2011 Bedford Mayoral elections. In the campaign for Bedford Mayor, he finished a close second to the Liberal Democrat candidate in the second ballot.

Bedford Mayoral Election 5 May 2011
Party	Candidate	1st round		2nd round			1st round votesTransfer votes, 2nd round
Party	Candidate	Total	Of round	Transfers	Total	Of round	1st round votesTransfer votes, 2nd round
Liberal Democrats	Dave Hodgson	19,966		4,325	24,291		
Conservative	John Guthrie	17,501		1,824	19,325		
Labour	Michelle Harris	11,197					
Independent	Tony Hare	3,133					
Green	Greg Paszynski	1,211					
Liberal Democrats hold							
