= 1979 Liverpool City Council election =

← 1978	6 May 1980	1980 →

33 seats were up for election (one third): one seat for each of the 33 wards. 50 seats needed for a majority

Elections to Liverpool City Council were held on 3 May 1979. One third of the council was up for election and the Council remained with no overall control.

The election was held on the same day as the national general election, which is why the turnout was so much greater than normal.

After the election, the composition of the council was:

Party	Seats	±
Labour	42	+5
Liberal	30	-5
Conservative	27	0

== Election result ==
Liverpool local election result 1979
Party	Seats	Gains	Losses	Net gain/loss	Seats %	Votes %	Votes	+/−
Labour	19	6	1	+5	57%	41%	112,204	
Conservative	6	2	2	0	18%	31%	84,241	
Liberal	8	1	6	-5	24%	28%	76,890	
Communist	0	0	0	0	0%	1%	1,855	
Independent Liberal	0	0	0	0	0%	0.1%	362	

== Ward results ==
* - Councillor seeking re-election

^{(PARTY)} - Party of former Councillor

=== Abercromby, St. James' ===
Abercromby, St. James'
Party	Candidate	Votes	%	±%
Labour	Violet McCoy *	3,250	49%	−13%
Liberal	Chris Davies	2,465	37%	+27%
Conservative	M. E. Cheshire	532	8%	−10%
Communist	Roger O'Hara	449	7%	−4
Majority		785		
Registered electors		12,233		
Turnout		6,696	55%	+37%
Labour hold		Swing		

=== Aigburth ===
Aigburth
Party	Candidate	Votes	%	±%
Conservative	J. H. Lea *	6,832	60%	+10%
Liberal	Cathy Hancox	2,671	24%	−18%
Labour	T. McManus	1,806	16%	+8%
Majority		4,367		
Registered electors		14,762		
Turnout		11,309	77%	+35%
Conservative hold		Swing		

=== Allerton ===
Allerton
Party	Candidate	Votes	%	±%
Conservative	J. S. Ross *	4,839 *	60%	+3%
Liberal	Francis Richard Haywood	3,218	40%	+10%
Majority		1,621		
Registered electors		10,894		
Turnout		8,057	74%	+38%
Conservative hold		Swing		

=== Anfield ===
Anfield
Party	Candidate	Votes	%	±%
Labour	F. J. McGurk	3,891	43%	+14%
Conservative	T. P. Pink ^{(PARTY)}	3,022	34%	−5%
Liberal	J. A. Kaitiff	2,100	23%	−9%
Majority		869		
Registered electors		12,667		
Turnout		9,-13	71%	+42%
Labour gain from Conservative		Swing		

=== Arundel ===
Arundel
Party	Candidate	Votes	%	±%
Labour	J. L. Taylor	2,769	36%	+11%
Conservative	J. C. Shaw	2,571	33%	+5%
Liberal	John George Morgan ^{(PARTY)}	2,450	31%	−16%
Majority		198		
Registered electors		12,722		
Turnout		7,790	61%	+35%
Labour gain from Liberal		Swing	+8%	

=== Breckfield, St. Domingo ===
Breckfield, St. Domingo
Party	Candidate	Votes	%	±%
Liberal	Frank McNevin *	3,648	47%	+5%
Labour	P. H. Rowe	2,865	37%	+1%
Conservative	B. J. Hawkins	1,191	15%	−6%
Majority		783		
Registered electors		11,901		
Turnout		7,704	65%	+41%
Liberal hold		Swing	+5%	

=== Broadgreen ===
Broadgreen
Party	Candidate	Votes	%	±%
Liberal	Rosie Cooper *	3,612	42%	−4%
Conservative	R. H. Mather	2,825	33%	−5%
Labour	D. E. Krumbein	2,213	26%	+9%
Majority		787		
Registered electors		12,099		
Turnout		8,650	71%	+36%
Liberal hold		Swing		

=== Central, Everton, Netherfield ===
Central, Everton, Netherfield
Party	Candidate	Votes	%	±%
Labour	J. Finnegan *	4,547	72%	+6%
Conservative	P. T. Rankin	913	14%	−13%
Liberal	C. Cartmel	627	10%	+4%
Communist	R. Cartwright	211	3%	
Majority		3,634		
Registered electors		11,519		
Turnout		6,298	55%	+38%
Labour hold		Swing		

=== Childwall ===
Childwall
Party	Candidate	Votes	%	±%
Conservative	W. A. N. Fearenside *	7,425	51%	+2%
Labour	H. A. Smith	3,768	26%	+11%
Liberal	F. C. Ricketts	3,132	22%	−13%
Majority		3,657		
Registered electors		20,190		
Turnout		14,510	72%	+38%
Conservative hold		Swing		

=== Church ===
Church
Party	Candidate	Votes	%	±%
Conservative	R. F. Symington	4,671	42%	0%
Liberal	C. E. Gordon ^{(PARTY)}	4,385	40%	−10%
Labour	D. P. Power	1,943	18%	+9%
Majority				
Registered electors		286		
Turnout		14,983	73%	+36%
Conservative gain from Liberal		Swing		

=== Clubmoor ===
Clubmoor
Party	Candidate	Votes	%	±%
Liberal	Mike Storey *	3,501	44%	0%
Labour	W. P. Lafferty	2,881	37%	+4%
Conservative	F. M. Kennedy	1,502	19%	−4%
Majority		620		
Registered electors		10,850		
Turnout		7,884	73%	+38%
Liberal hold		Swing		

=== County ===
County
Party	Candidate	Votes	%	±%
Labour	P. A. Dunlop	3,757	44%	+11%
Conservative	H. Brown *	2,144	25%	−11%
Liberal	R. J. Cunningham	2,638	31%	+2%
Majority		1,119		
Registered electors		11,866		
Turnout		8,539	72%	+46%
Labour gain from Conservative		Swing		

=== Croxteth ===
Croxteth
Party	Candidate	Votes	%	±%
Conservative	R. F. Butler	4,380	46%	+4%
Labour	F. Burke	2,635	27%	+12%
Liberal	Ivan Clews *	2,569	27%	−15%
Majority		1,745		
Registered electors		12,866		
Turnout		9,584	74%	+35%
Conservative gain from Liberal		Swing		

=== Dingle ===
Dingle
Party	Candidate	Votes	%	±%
Labour	S. W. Jones *	2,960	63%	+8%
Liberal	J. Lamb	696	15%	+5%
Conservative	J. A. Watson	952	20%	−10%
Communist	J. Greig	113	2%	
Majority		2,008		
Registered electors		7,388		
Turnout		4,721	64%	+41%
Labour hold		Swing		

=== Dovecot ===
Dovecot
Party	Candidate	Votes	%	±%
Labour	W. H. Westbury *	6,382	58%	+8%
Conservative	J. F. McMillan	3,043	28%	+3%
Liberal	William John Cooper	1,557	14%	−11%
Majority		3,339		
Registered electors		16,552		
Turnout		10,982	66%	+40%
Labour hold		Swing		

=== Fairfield ===
Fairfield
Party	Candidate	Votes	%	±%
Liberal	Carol Hancox	3,353	53%	+20%
Labour	P. F. McAllister ^{(PARTY)}	1,879	30%	−10%
Conservative	N. Wilkinson	1,112	18%	−9%
Majority		1,474		
Registered electors		9,885		
Turnout		6,344	64%	+37%
Liberal gain from Labour		Swing		

=== Fazakerley ===
Fazakerley
Party	Candidate	Votes	%	±%
Labour	D. J. Lloyd ^{(PARTY)}	3,951	47%	+16%
Conservative	R. Gould	3,096	37%	−1%
Liberal	Thomas Richard Jones	1,318	16%	−15%
Majority		855		
Registered electors		11,505		
Turnout		8,365	73%	+42%
Labour hold		Swing		

=== Gillmoss ===
Gillmoss
Party	Candidate	Votes	%	±%
Labour	P. J. Murphy ^{(PARTY)}	7,702	66%	+8%
Conservative	A. Gore	2,647	23%	−1%
Liberal	T. N. Sawney	1,306	11%	−7%
Majority		5,055		
Registered electors		18,720		
Turnout		11,655	62%	+48%
Labour hold		Swing	+8%	

=== Granby, Prince's Park ===
Granby, Prince's Park
Party	Candidate	Votes	%	±%
Labour	A. Doswell *	4,203	58%	+2%
Liberal	Arthur Eric Damsell	1,483	20%	+9%
Conservative	A. Palin	1,363	19%	−12%
Communist	E. Caddick	193	3%	
Majority		2,720		
Registered electors		12,154		
Turnout		7,242	60%	+40%
Labour hold		Swing		

=== Kensington ===
Kensington
Party	Candidate	Votes	%	±%
Liberal	Frank Doran *	2,828	66%	+17%
Labour	A. Quinn	1,082	25%	−8%
Conservative	D. Ellis	406	9%	−8%
Majority		1,746		
Registered electors		6,426		
Turnout		4,316	67%	+39%
Liberal hold		Swing		

=== Low Hill, Smithdown ===
Low Hill, Smithdown
Party	Candidate	Votes	%	±%
Liberal	Ernest Richard Stephenson *	3,406	62%	+1%
Labour	J. A. Devaney	2,080	38%	+8%
Majority		1,326		
Registered electors		8,320		
Turnout		5,486	66%	+41%
Liberal hold		Swing		

=== Melrose, Westminster ===
Melrose, Westminster
Party	Candidate	Votes	%	±%
Labour	W. Lafferty *	3,400	61%	−3%
Liberal	J. Bradley	1,574	28%	+20%
Conservative	J. A. Carpenter	601	11%	−17%
Majority		1,826		
Registered electors		8,190		
Turnout		5,575	68%	+49%
Labour hold		Swing		

=== Old Swan ===
Old Swan
Party	Candidate	Votes	%	±%
Labour	P, Lloyd	3,202	38%	+19%
Conservative	I. McFall	2,464	29%	−2%
Liberal	W. M. Galbraith ^{(PARTY)}	2,374	28%	−12%
Independent Liberal	W. J. McCullough	362	4%	+2%
Communist	H. Mohin	109	1%	
Majority		738		
Registered electors		12,361		
Turnout		8,511	69%	+36%
Labour gain from Liberal		Swing		

=== Picton ===
Picton
Party	Candidate	Votes	%	±%
Liberal	Herbert Edward Herrity *	4,428	56%	+7%
Labour	A. Williams	2,337	30%	−2%
Conservative	J. McDermott	1,023	13%	−5%
Communist	J. Volleamere	91	1%	−1%
Majority		2,091		
Registered electors		11,081		
Turnout		7,879	71%	+36%
Liberal hold		Swing		

=== Pirrie ===
Pirrie
Party	Candidate	Votes	%	±%
Labour	P. Owens *	6,654	59%	+9%
Liberal	Elsie G. Lang	1,244	11%	−7%
Conservative	I. Brown	3,317	30%	−3%
Majority		3,337		
Registered electors		16,018		
Turnout		11,215	70%	+46%
Labour hold		Swing		

=== St. Mary's ===
St. Mary's
Party	Candidate	Votes	%	±%
Labour	R. C. Evans *	3,387	54%	+7%
Liberal	G. B. Bennett	910	15%	−5%
Conservative	J. B. King	1,847	30%	−3%
Communist	J. M. McQueen	105	2%	
Majority		1,540		
Registered electors		9,090		
Turnout		6,249	69%	+41%
Labour hold		Swing		

=== St. Michael's ===
St. Michael's
Party	Candidate	Votes	%	±%
Liberal	Richard Kemp *	3,258	47%	+7%
Conservative	O. Y. Hughes	1,804	26%	−13%
Labour	G. G. Pratt	1,801	26%	+5%
Majority		1,454		
Registered electors		9,954		
Turnout		6,863	69%	+37%
Liberal hold		Swing		

=== Sandhills, Vauxhall ===
Sandhills, Vauxhall
Party	Candidate	Votes	%	±%
Labour	J. Morgan *	4,351	83%	−1%
Liberal	Steve R. Radford	355	7%	+2%
Conservative	G. Widdows	375	7%	−4%
Communist	W. Albertina	169	3%	
Majority		3,976		
Registered electors		8,820		
Turnout		5,250	60%	+43%
Labour hold		Swing		

=== Speke ===
Speke
Party	Candidate	Votes	%	±%
Labour	J. McLean ^{(PARTY)}	6,081	65%	+17%
Conservative	T. Morrison	2,293	25%	0%
Liberal	G. Mason	942	10%	+1%
Majority		3,788		
Registered electors		14,232		
Turnout		9,316	65%	+46%
Labour hold		Swing		

=== Tuebrook ===
Tuebrook
Party	Candidate	Votes	%	±%
Labour	J. E. Roberts	2,864	37%	+5%
Liberal	Robert Gore ^{(PARTY)}	2,771	36%	−4%
Conservative	F. C. Kirkby	2,157	28%	+1%
Majority		75		
Registered electors		11,073		
Turnout		7,774	70%	+39%
Labour gain from Liberal		Swing	+3.5	

=== Warbreck ===
Warbreck
Party	Candidate	Votes	%	±%
Labour	P. J. Sommerfield	2,846	37%	+12%
Liberal	Joseph Lang *	2,871	35%	−8%
Conservative	H. M. Rigby	2,519	30%	−3%
Majority		4		
Registered electors		11,591		
Turnout		8,265	71%	+40%
Labour gain from Liberal		Swing		

=== Woolton, East ===
Woolton, East
Party	Candidate	Votes	%	±%
Labour	D. A. Hatton ^{(PARTY)}	5,644	65%	+12%
Conservative	S. Fitzsimmons	2,030	23%	+2%
Liberal	Catherine Kaufmann	814	9%	−10%
Communist	B. O'Keefe	230	3%	−3%
Majority		3,614		
Registered electors		13,341		
Turnout		8,718	65%	+40%
Labour hold		Swing		

=== Woolton, West ===
Woolton, West
Party	Candidate	Votes	%	±%
Conservative	C. J. Hallows *	8,345	61%	0%
Labour	P. R. Martin	3,062	22%	+7%
Liberal	A. Smallman	2,386	17%	−7%
Majority		5,283		
Registered electors		18,066		
Turnout		5,283	76%	+41%
Conservative hold		Swing		
