= Patrick Hall (politician) =

British politician (born 1951)

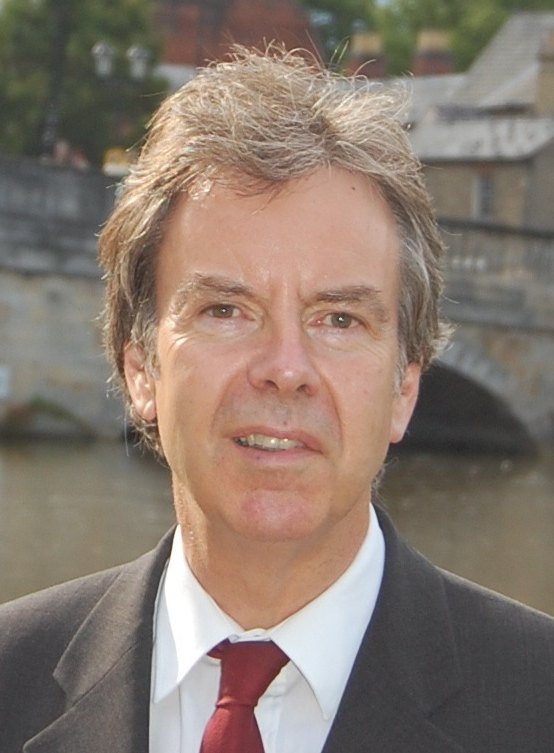

Member of Parliament for Bedford
- In office 1 May 1997 – 12 April 2010
- Preceded by: Constituency Recreated
- Succeeded by: Richard Fuller

Personal details
- Born: 20 October 1951 (age 74) Birmingham, Warwickshire, England
- Party: Labour
- Spouse: Claudia Caggiula
- Education: Oxford Brookes University
- Website: www.patrick4bedford.com

Patrick Hall (born 20 October 1951) is a British Labour Party politician who was the Member of Parliament (MP) for Bedford from 1997 to 2010. He was reselected by the Labour Party as their candidate in Bedford for the 2015 general election, but failed to win re-election to Parliament.

== Early life ==
Patrick Hall was educated at the independent Bedford Modern School, the University of Birmingham and Oxford Polytechnic. He joined Bedford Borough Council in 1975 as a local government planning officer, becoming the borough's Town Centre Coordinator. Hall remained employed by the council until his election to Parliament.

He was elected as a councillor to the Bedfordshire County Council 1989–97 and was a member of the North Bedfordshire Community Health Council. He contested Bedfordshire North at the 1992 General Election, but was defeated by the veteran Conservative MP Trevor Skeet by 11,618 votes.

== Parliamentary career ==
Patrick Hall was elected to the House of Commons at the 1997 General Election for the new seat of Bedford with a majority of 8,300. He was re-elected at the 2001 and 2005 election. Hall was Bedford's third Labour MP and the first to hold the seat for more than one term.

He made his maiden speech on 30 July 1997, where he celebrated the history of Bedford and paid tribute to the town's diverse population. He also raised issues about the lack adequate and affordable housing supply, a cause which he would champion throughout his parliamentary career.

Hall made his reputation as being an attentive constituency-based MP. His work in Parliament reflected his experience in town planning, becoming the chair of the all-parliamentary group on town centre management. He was also a vocal campaigner on better transport links for Bedford, pushing for the Bedford by-pass and rail investment for the town's many commuters.

In 2003, Hall was one of 139 Labour MPs to rebel against the Government whip by voting in favour of an amendment which stated that there was no moral case for war in Iraq. In the end, Hall did not vote for the declaration of war, choosing not to vote on the motion.

In his final term in Parliament, Hall voiced his opposition to the Trident nuclear weapons programme, voting against its continuance.

During the expenses scandal, Hall remained one of the few MPs to be applauded for his integrity on claims. His expenses claims were among the lowest total claims of all MPs. He was described as one of the 'saints' by the Daily Telegraph, the newspaper which broke the expenses scandal story in 2009.

Hall lost his seat in the 2010 General Election to Conservative candidate Richard Fuller, who had also challenged him unsuccessfully in 2005. Fuller's slim majority of 1,353 made Bedford the Conservatives' twenty-fifth most marginal seat in Britain and a major target for Labour at the next general election.

On 30 June 2012, he was selected as Labour candidate for Bedford for the 2015 general election, but was defeated in the 2015 General Election.

== Personal life ==
Patrick is married to Claudia and has two step sons, Giovanni and Gabriele. He enjoys squash and gardening.

Parliament of the United Kingdom
New constituency	Member of Parliament for Bedford; 1997–2010	Succeeded by Richard Fuller
