= Icons: The Greatest Person of the 20th Century =

- Directed by: James Morgan
- Presented by: Nick Robinson (live final); Claudia Winkleman (live final)
- Country of origin: United Kingdom
- Original language: English
- No. of series: 1
- No. of episodes: 8

Production
- Executive producers: David Glover; Cate Hall; Francesca Maudslay
- Producer: Emma Jay
- Production location: Indigo at The O2 (live final)
- Running time: 60 minutes
- Production company: 72 Films

Original release
- Network: BBC Two
- Release: 8 January – 5 February 2019

Icons: The Greatest Person of the 20th Century (also referred to as simply Icons) is a 2019 BBC television series, aired on BBC Two, which pits the greatest people of the 20th century against each other in a competition.

== Premise ==
Each episode contains four 'icons' in a particular field, with a presenter or "advocate" leading the audience through each of the four choices. The audience then has one vote in which they can choose their favourite icon, who would go through to the final, or in the case of the final, be their winner.

== Results ==
=== Heat One – Leaders ===
Broadcast – 8 January 2019
Advocate – Sir Trevor McDonald

Icon	Occupation	Chosen For	Status
Nelson Mandela	Former President of South Africa	Overcoming imprisonment and leading South Africa out of apartheid	Winner
Margaret Thatcher	Former Prime Minister of the United Kingdom	Becoming the first Woman Prime Minister	Runner-up
Winston Churchill	Former Prime Minister of the United Kingdom	Leading Britain to victory in World War II	Runner-up
Franklin D. Roosevelt	Former President of the United States	Successfully leading The United States despite paraplegia from poliomyelitis	Runner-up

=== Heat Two – Explorers ===
Broadcast – 9 January 2019
Advocate – Dermot O'Leary

Icon	Occupation	Chosen For	Status
Ernest Shackleton	Exploration	Leading a particularly challenging South Pole expedition	Winner
Jane Goodall	Primatologist	Leading the way in primate exploration and eco-awareness	Runner-up
Neil Armstrong	Astronaut	Being the first man on the moon as part of the Apollo 11 mission	Runner-up
Gertrude Bell	Writer and Traveller	Being the first woman to map and travel across the Arabian Peninsula	Runner-up

=== Heat Three – Scientists ===
Broadcast – 14 January 2019
Advocate – Chris Packham

Icon	Occupation	Chosen For	Status
Alan Turing	Codebreaker	Deciphering the Enigma machine and aiding an allied victory in World War II	Winner
Marie Curie	Radiologist	Discovering radium and becoming the first female recipient of the Nobel Prize for Physics and Chemistry	Runner-up
Albert Einstein	Physicist	Penning the theory of relativity and the equation of mass–energy equivalence	Runner-up
Tu Youyou	Chemist	Inventing the malaria vaccine in a time of Chinese social turmoil	Runner-up

=== Heat Four – Entertainers ===
Broadcast – 15 January 2019
Advocate – Kathleen Turner

Icon	Occupation	Chosen For	Status
David Bowie	Musician and actor	Breaking boundaries as a cutting-edge, bisexual musician	Winner
Charlie Chaplin	Actor and film director	Becoming the world's first global movie star	Runner-up
Marilyn Monroe	Actress and model	Defining her era through her modelling and acting work	Runner-up
Billie Holiday	Singer-songwriter	Successfully changing the world of jazz despite segregation	Runner-up

=== Heat Five – Activists ===
Broadcast – 21 January 2019
Advocate – Sanjeev Bhaskar

Icon	Occupation	Chosen For	Status
Martin Luther King Jr.	civil rights campaigner	Successfully ending racial segregation in the United States through nonviolence	Winner
Helen Keller	Author and activist	Used her status as a successful author to fight for peace despite being deafblind	Runner-up
Emmeline Pankhurst	Women's rights campaigner	Successfully led the suffragette movement and got women the right to vote	Runner-up
Mahatma Gandhi	Leader of the Indian independence movement	Successfully led the Indian independence movement through nonviolence	Runner-up

=== Heat Six – Sports Stars ===
Broadcast – 22 January 2019
Advocate – Clare Balding

Icon	Occupation	Chosen For	Status
Muhammad Ali	Boxer	His outstanding contribution to boxing and his anti-Vietnam war stance despite repercussions	Winner
Tanni Grey-Thompson	Paralympian and Baroness	Her outstanding contribution to Paralympic sports and disability rights campaigning in the House of Lords	Runner-up
Billie Jean King	Tennis player	Her outstanding contribution to tennis and her campaigning for women's rights within the sport	Runner-up
Pelé	Footballer	His outstanding contribution to football	Runner-up

=== Heat Seven – Artists and Writers ===
Broadcast – 29 January 2019
Advocate – Lily Cole

Icon	Occupation	Chosen For	Status
Pablo Picasso	Artist	His outstanding contribution to painting and standing up in the face of war – in the case of Guernica.	Winner
Alfred Hitchcock	Filmmaker	Changing the world of directing and inventing the horror genre	Runner-up
Virginia Woolf	Writer	Modernising writing despite mental illness	Runner-up
Andy Warhol	Artist	His outstanding contribution to the Pop art movement	Runner-up

=== Episode Eight – The Final ===
This episode was broadcast live from Indigo at The O2, hosted by Nick Robinson and Claudia Winkleman on 5 February 2019.

Icon	Category	Occupation	Chosen For	Status
Nelson Mandela	Leaders	Former President of South Africa	Overcoming imprisonment and leading South Africa out of apartheid	Finalist
Ernest Shackleton	Explorers	Explorer	Leading a particularly challenging South Pole expedition	Finalist
Alan Turing	Scientists	Codebreaker	Deciphering the Enigma machine and aiding an allied victory in World War II	Winner
David Bowie	Entertainers	Musician and actor	Breaking boundaries as a cutting-edge, Bisexual musician	Finalist
Martin Luther King Jr.	Activists	Civil Rights Campaigner	Successfully ending segregation in the United States through nonviolence	Finalist
Muhammad Ali	Sports Stars	Boxer	His outstanding contribution to boxing and his anti-Vietnam war stance despite repercussions	Finalist
Pablo Picasso	Artists and Writers	Artist	His outstanding contribution to painting and standing up in the face of war – in the case of Guernica.	Finalist

== Controversy ==
The Icons series attracted controversy after some people were left unhappy with those selected to represent each category. The Entertainers category sparked particular debate regarding the omission of Elvis Presley, The Beatles, and Madonna, and similar critiques were raised regarding Diana, Princess of Wales and John F. Kennedy's absence from the list.
