= North Bedfordshire (constituency) =

UK Parliament constituency (1983–1997, 2024 onwards)

Coordinates: 52.19°N 0.4°W

- County constituency for the House of Commons
- Interactive map of boundaries from 2024
- Location within the East of England
- County: Bedfordshire
- Electorate: 76,319 (March 2020)
- Major settlements: Biggleswade, Sandy

Current constituency
- Created: 2024
- Member of Parliament: Richard Fuller (Conservative)
- Seats: One
- Created from: Bedfordshire North East

1983–1997
- Created from: Bedford
- Replaced by: Bedford, Bedfordshire North East

North Bedfordshire is a county constituency in Bedfordshire. It returns one Member of Parliament (MP) to the House of Commons of the Parliament of the United Kingdom, elected by the first-past-the-post voting system. It has been represented by Richard Fuller of the Conservative Party since the constituency was re-established under the 2023 review of Westminster constituencies for the 2024 general election. Fuller was MP for the predecessor constituency of North East Bedfordshire from 2019 to 2024 and represented Bedford from 2010 to 2017. The seat had originally been created for the 1983 general election and abolished for the 1997 general election.

== Constituency profile ==
North Bedfordshire is a constituency in Bedfordshire, covering the towns and villages surrounding the large town of Bedford. Its largest settlement is the historic market town of Biggleswade, which has a population of around 23,000. Other settlements include the towns of Sandy and Potton and the villages of Shortstown, Clapham, Bromham, Biddenham and Great Denham.

This is a mostly rural constituency with many small villages. It is generally affluent with low levels of deprivation, especially so in the villages on the western edge of Bedford. Many of the towns and villages have new housing developments. House prices are similar to the rest of the East of England and the average price is higher than the national average.

Residents of North Bedfordshire have a similar age profile to the rest of the country, but with a lower proportion of young adults. Residents have high levels of education and homeownership. Household income is high and the rate of child poverty is low. A high proportion of residents work in professional occupations, particularly in the retail sector, and a low proportion claim unemployment benefits. White people made up 90% of the population at the 2021 census.

At the local council level, the eastern towns of Biggleswade, Sandy and Potton are mostly represented by independent councillors. The rest of the constituency elected Conservatives with some Liberal Democrats in the villages close to Bedford. An estimated 54% of voters in North Bedfordshire supported leaving the European Union in the 2016 referendum, similar to the UK-wide figure of 52%.

== History ==
This safe Conservative seat was originally held for its entire initial existence by Trevor Skeet who had been the MP for Bedford since 1970. On its re-establishment in 2024, it was won by Richard Fuller who was MP for Bedford from 2010 to 2017 and for North East Bedfordshire from 2019 to 2024.

== Boundaries ==
=== 1983–1997 ===
The Borough of North Bedfordshire wards of Brickhill, Bromham, Carlton, Castle, Cauldwell, Clapham, De Parys, Felmersham, Goldington, Harpur, Harrold, Kingsbrook, Newnham, Oakley, Putnoe, Queens Park, Renhold, Riseley, Roxton, and Sharnbrook.

The territory the seat covered was virtually the same as Bedford which it replaced. This included the town of Bedford itself, but not the adjoining community of Kempston. In 1997, the constituency was abolished, being dispersed on a roughly seven to three ratio between a re-established Bedford and the new constituency of Bedfordshire North East, with 17 electors being transferred to Huntingdon.

=== Current ===
The re-established constituency was defined as comprising the following (as they existed on 1 December 2020):

- The Borough of Bedford wards of: Bromham and Biddenham; Clapham; Eastcotts; Great Barford; Harrold; Kempston Rural; Oakley; Riseley; Sharnbrook; Wyboston.
- The District of Central Bedfordshire wards of: Biggleswade North; Biggleswade South; Northill; Potton; Sandy.

Subject to minor changes due to the revision of local authority ward boundaries, the constituency is the successor to North East Bedfordshire – except south eastern areas, including the communities of Arlesey, Langford and Stotfold, which were included in the re-established, cross-county boundary, constituency of Hitchin.

Following further local government boundary reviews in Bedford and Central Bedfordshire which came into effect in May 2023, the constituency now comprises the following from the 2024 general election:

- The Borough of Bedford wards of: Biddenham; Brickhill (small part); Bromham; Clapham & Oakley; Great Barford; Great Denham; Harrold; Kempston West (part); Renhold & Ravensden (most); Riseley; Sharnbrook; Shortstown; Wootton & Kempston Rural (Kempston Rural parish); Wyboston; and a very small part of Harpur.
- The District of Central Bedfordshire wards of: Biggleswade East; Biggleswade West; Northill; Potton; Sandy.

== Members of Parliament ==
=== MPs 1983–1997 ===
Bedford prior to 1983

Election	Member	Party
1983	Trevor Skeet	Conservative
1997	constituency abolished	

=== MPs since 2024 ===
Bedfordshire North East prior to 2024

Election	Member	Party
2024	Richard Fuller	Conservative

== Elections ==
=== Elections in the 2020s ===
General election 2024: North Bedfordshire
Party	Candidate	Votes	%	±%
Conservative	Richard Fuller	19,981	38.8	−22.3
Labour	Uday Nagaraju	14,567	28.3	+9.2
Reform	Pippa Clayton	8,433	16.4	+16.2
Liberal Democrats	Joanna Szaub-Newton	5,553	10.8	−2.4
Green	Philippa Fleming	3,027	5.9	+3.1
Majority		5,414	10.5	−31.5
Turnout		51,561	65.4	−8.2
Registered electors		78,850		
Conservative hold		Swing	−15.8	

=== Elections in the 2010s ===
2019 notional result
Party	Vote	%
Conservative	34,360	61.1
Labour	10,729	19.1
Liberal Democrats	7,403	13.2
Others	2,023	3.6
Green	1,585	2.8
Brexit Party	102	0.2
Turnout	56,202	73.6
Electorate	76,319	

== Election results 1983–1997 ==
=== Elections in the 1980s ===
General election 1983: North Bedfordshire
Party	Candidate	Votes	%	±%
Conservative	Trevor Skeet	27,969	52.0	
Liberal	Brian Gibbons	14,120	26.3	
Labour	Pat Healy	11,323	21.1	
Independent	N. Hughes	344	0.6	
Majority		13,849	25.7	
Turnout		53,756	75.2	
Conservative win (new seat)				

General election 1987: North Bedfordshire
Party	Candidate	Votes	%	±%
Conservative	Trevor Skeet	29,845	52.6	+0.6
Liberal	Janice Lennon	13,340	23.5	−2.8
Labour	Carl Henderson	13,140	23.1	+2.0
OOBPC	Crispin Slee	435	0.8	New
Majority		16,505	29.1	+3.4
Turnout		56,760	77.2	+2.0
Conservative hold		Swing	+1.7	

=== Elections in the 1990s ===
General election 1992: North Bedfordshire
Party	Candidate	Votes	%	±%
Conservative	Trevor Skeet	29,970	50.7	−1.9
Labour	Patrick Hall	18,302	31.0	+7.9
Liberal Democrats	Mike Smithson	10,014	16.9	−6.6
Green	Louise Smith	643	1.1	New
Natural Law	Bernard Bence	178	0.3	New
Majority		11,668	19.7	−9.4
Turnout		59,107	80.1	+2.9
Conservative hold		Swing	−4.8	

== See also ==
- List of parliamentary constituencies in Bedfordshire
- List of parliamentary constituencies in the East of England (region)
- North East Bedfordshire (UK Parliament constituency)
