= Young Conservatives (UK) =

Youth wing of the British Conservative Party

- Founded: 16 March 2018
- Preceded by: Conservative Future
- Headquarters: 4 Matthew Parker Street, London SW1A
- Ideology: Conservatism (British); Economic liberalism British unionism
- Colours: Blue
- Mother party: Conservative Party
- International affiliation: International Young Democrat Union
- European affiliation: European Young Conservatives
- Website: youth.conservatives.com

The Young Conservatives (YC) is the youth wing of the Conservative Party in the United Kingdom for members aged under 30. The organisation shares the same values and policies as its parent political party with branches being an integrated part of local associations. College and university branches are not included, but run independently.

== History ==
=== Origins ===
The Junior Imperial and Constitutional League was formed in 1906 with objectives to encourage practical political work and organisation among young people in Britain. Junior Associations were set up in each Parliamentary Division and throughout the British Empire, co-operating closely with Conservative and Unionist Associations with an ambition to create Imperial unity and to further the Conservative and Unionist cause.

In 1925, the Young Britons Organisation was formed as the juvenile branch of the National Union of Conservative and Unionist Associations. It closed down during the Second World War.

After the Conservative Party suffered a catastrophic defeat in the 1945 general election, the Young Britons Organisation was reformed to cater for both boys and girls aged 6–16, while the Young Conservatives was set up to cater for an older age group.

=== Young Conservatives (1906–1998) ===
Young Conservatives fancy dress dance, mid 1950s

The Young Conservatives attracted a large following and, by 1955, claimed a membership of 150,000. This made it the largest political youth movement in a liberal democracy, though not all its members were strongly motivated by politics. A large part of its appeal lay in its social activities that brought young people together in a socially safe environment. Countless middle-class British couples met at the "YCs" dances, rambles, and charity events in the 1950s. In the period between it published a magazine entitled Impact. One large factor in the rapid decline in membership was the factionalism that gripped the movement in the early 1980s, first manifesting itself during Eric Pickles' chairmanship.

... his year in office was not without its difficulties. The radical right was a growing force in young Tory politics. The S.D.P. had recently been founded and disillusioned liberals in both the Labour and Conservative parties were deserting to the new "centre" party. At the Young Conservative's national conference in Eastbourne in February 1981, Pickles presided over a growing split in the ranks, particularly between northern "liberals" and southern "right-wingers".

From that point onwards, a battle for leadership ensued between the moderates ('One Nation' Tories, termed 'Wets') and 'Drys' (Right-wingers from the Monday Club and Libertarians). The moderates attempted to play up the image problems the Young Monday Club and the Libertarians would present to the organisation. Publications such as The Sin, a North West Area YC Rag Mag, featured a page in 1985 attacking the Young Monday Club image. The 1989 edition of The Sin attempted to target the growing libertarian threat by featuring 'Loonie Libs'.

The capture of the Young Conservatives by the 'Dries' in 1989 led to increasing image problems as the more right-wing stance became pilloried in the media. "The very term 'Young Conservative' has actually entered popular culture in a derogatory way being used by comedians to lampoon a certain type of person." The BBC series A Bit of Fry and Laurie, featured a sketch entitled 'Young Conservative of the Year', the basis of which was an arrogant, right-wing and upper class Young Conservative competing in a mock contest on the reactionary and authoritarian content of his speech in a mock contest. In the BBC series Harry Enfield and Chums, Harry Enfield played a character called 'Tory Boy', an arrogant and reactionary right-wing Young Conservative.

Membership fell from a peak of 250,000 to just a few thousand, while the rival organisation Conservative Students claimed significantly more members. The end came in 1998 when Conservative leader William Hague announced the closure of Young Conservatives and the launch of a new organisation, Conservative Future.

==== Past chairmen ====
The National Chairmen of the Young Conservatives were associated with the moderate (One Nation – Tory Reform Group) tradition of the Conservative Party until the 1989 election, which resulted in the defeat of the moderate incumbent. Until then leadership had been from the Conservative party 'left' with only a couple of exceptions. Notable exceptions to the 'One Nation' moderate leadership were David Atkinson MP, who was a committed Christian campaigner and backer of corporal punishment, and Sir Fergus Montgomery MP, a supporter of apartheid South Africa and another corporal punishment advocate. Otherwise, the YCs produced a long line of Tory reformers, until the moderate faction was finally defeated in the late 1980s, although Clive Landa's defeat of Christopher Horne (the chairman of the Hyde Park Tories) in the 1973 election in Greater London was far closer than was expected, even by the supporters of both candidates.

- Sir William van Straubenzee, National Chairman 1951–53
- Geoffrey Finsberg, National Chairman 1953–57
- Fergus Montgomery, 1957–58
- Peter Walker, National Chairman 1958–60
- Sir Andrew Bowden National Chairman 1960–61
- Terence Wray, National Chairman 1960–63
- Nick Scott, National Chairman 1963–64
- Alan Haselhurst, National Chairman 1964–66
- David Atkinson, National Chairman 1970–1
- John Watson, National Chairman 1971–72
- David Hunt, now Baron Hunt of Wirral, 1976–97 National Chairman 1972–73
- Clive Landa, National Chairman 1974–75
- Tony Kerpel, National Chairman 1975–76
- Michael Jack, National Chairman 1977
- Chris Gent, National Chairman 1977–79. Chairman of GlaxoSmithKline
- Bob Hughes, National Chairman 1979–80
- Eric Pickles, National Chairman 1980–81
- Iain Picton, National Chairman 1981–82
- Phil Pedley, National Chairman 1982–84
- John Guthrie, National Chairman 1984–85
- Richard Fuller, National Chairman 1985–87
- Nick Robinson, National Chairman 1987–88, later BBC political editor
- Martin Woodruffe, National Chairman 1988–89
- Andrew Tinney, 1989–91
- Murdo Fraser, National Chairman 1991–92
- Adrian McLellan, National Chairman 1992–93
- Andrew Rosindell MP, National Chairman in 1993–94
- Adrian Lee, National Chairman 1994–1995
- Cllr Paul Clarke (Andersen), National Chairman 1995–1996
- Kevin Ghateh, Interim National Chairman 2025–2026
- Kevin Ghateh, National Chairman 2026–

==== Past Vice Chairmen ====
A large number of Vice Chairmen have gone on to other prominent positions in the Party and hold public office at local and national level. These include: Patrick McLoughlin MP, Robert Atkins MP, Kenneth Lane, Anthea McIntyre MEP and Robin Squire MP.

=== Conservative Future (1998–2016) ===
In 1998, Conservative Future was launched as the new youth wing following major reforms by William Hague, who was elected as the honorary president of Conservative Future in 2012. By 2006, it was the largest political organisation on British campuses, and the estimated membership, including members on campuses and through constituency associations, may once have totalled 20,000.

On 19 November 2015, the entire executive of the organisation was suspended, and the youth wing taken under direct control by the Conservative Party. The national Conservative Future was eventually disbanded; however, Conservative Future Scotland continued to function.

=== Young Conservatives (2018–present) ===
In 2018, following the appointment of Ben Bradley as Vice-Chairman of the Conservative Party for youth and with a focus on young members, the party announced at its spring forum it was relaunching a youth branch under the original name 'Young Conservatives'.

The structure of Young Conservative branches will be integrated with local Associations and into the wider voluntary party with officers being elected by members of the association. University YC branches will operate independently. The organisation aims to increase youth ownership and engagement in local associations by focusing on activities which are tangible for the success of the party. After the publication of the Chequers Brexit white paper Ben Bradley tendered his resignation as Vice-Chairman for youth and was subsequently succeeded by Tom Pursglove. Pursglove was replaced by Nigel Huddleston in February 2019, and Pursglove was replaced by Andrew Bowie in July 2019 after Boris Johnson took office.

The Young Conservatives were revived in 2025 as a part of efforts by leader Kemi Badenoch to improve the party image amongst younger voters. In September 2025, Kevin Ghateh was appointed as Interim National Young Conservative Chairman. He held the position alongside being the London Regional Chairman, as well as Chairman of the Barnet and Camden Young Conservatives. His Interim Deputy Chairman was Tyler Reeton.

In October 2026 the Young Conservatives held their first election in over 30 years. The election led to Kevin Ghateh becoming national chairman having won 46.1% of the vote, having previously served as interim chairman. The runner-ups, Reiss Cordrey and Matthew Goodwin-Freeman each achieved 30% and 23.9% of the vote respectively.

== See also ==
- Young Labour, the young wing of the Labour Party
- Young Liberals, the youth wing of the Liberal Democrats

== Bibliography ==
- Conservative Party Archive Youth Organisations, Bodleian Library, University of Oxford
