= Trevor Skeet =

New Zealand-born British politician

Member of Parliament for North Bedfordshire Bedford (1970–1983)
- In office 18 June 1970 – 8 April 1997
- Preceded by: Brian Parkyn
- Succeeded by: Patrick Hall

Member of Parliament for Willesden East
- In office 8 October 1959 – 25 September 1964
- Preceded by: Maurice Orbach
- Succeeded by: Reg Freeson

Personal details
- Born: 28 January 1918 Auckland, New Zealand
- Died: 14 August 2004 (aged 86)
- Party: Conservative
- Spouse(s): Elizabeth Gilling (m. 1958; died 1973) Valerie Benson (m. 1985)
- Children: 2
- Education: King's College, Auckland; University of Auckland
- Military career
- Service: New Zealand Army; New Zealand Navy
- Wars: World War II

Sir Trevor Herbert Harry Skeet (28 January 1918 – 14 August 2004) was a New Zealand-born lawyer and a British Conservative Party politician.

== Early life ==
Skeet was born in Auckland, New Zealand and was educated at King's College, Auckland and the University of Auckland. He served with the New Zealand Army and Navy during World War II. He was a barrister and solicitor at the Supreme Court of New Zealand and was called to the English Bar in 1947 by Inner Temple. He was a member of the Council of the Royal Empire Society.

== Political career ==
Skeet first stood for Parliament in Stoke Newington and Hackney North in 1951 and Llanelli in 1955. He was elected Member of Parliament for Willesden East in 1959, losing the seat in 1964. He was then MP for Bedford 1970-83 and North Bedfordshire 1983–97. Ahead of the 1992 election, he survived a deselection attempt by his constituency party. In the 1992-1997 Parliament, Skeet rebelled frequently against John Major's ailing government, on issues such as the Maastricht Treaty; Skeet was a staunch Eurosceptic. Indeed, Skeet was one of only eight Conservative MPs who voted against Major's government more than 50 times.

== Personal life ==
Skeet was first married to Elizabeth Gilling from 1958 to her death in 1973, and had two sons with her. He then married Valerie Benson in 1985 (later Lady Valerie Skeet), with whom he resided in Milton Ernest, Bedfordshire until his death. He was knighted in 1986.

Parliament of the United Kingdom
Preceded by Maurice Orbach	Member of Parliament for Willesden East; 1959–1964	Succeeded by Reg Freeson
Preceded by Brian Parkyn	Member of Parliament for Bedford; 1970–1983	Constituency abolished
New constituency	Member of Parliament for North Bedfordshire; 1983–1997	Constituency abolished
