= Philip Pedley =

British activist

Philip Pedley is a British conservative activist who held a number of positions in the Conservative Party at local, regional and national level and was appointed Deputy Chairman of one of the largest quangos in Wales.

== Education ==
Pedley was educated at Calday Grange Grammar School and Lancaster University.

== Young Conservatives ==
Pedley joined his local branch of the Young Conservatives in 1974 in response to the miners' strike that year and the defeat of the Conservative government. He rose to become chairman of the North West Area Young Conservatives. Working closely with his predecessor, Iain Picton, and his successor Jeff Green, the North West Area became the pre-eminent base of the moderates against right-wing elements from the Monday Club and hardline libertarians from the Federation of Conservative Students. Elected as National Vice-Chairman of the Young Conservatives in 1981, under Picton, Pedley was elected national chairman in 1982, serving two terms until 1984. He maintained the moderate Tory Reform Group's hold on the organisation to the frustration of right-wing elements. "During the 1980s the wets retained an iron grip on the YCs under the ruthless and efficient leadership of Iain Picton, John Guthrie and Phil Pedley."

=== Youth for Multilateral Disarmament – anti-CND front organisation ===
Under Picton's chairmanship, Pedley worked with the Ministry of Defence to counter the activities of the Youth CND in the party and established a moderate 'front' organisation to highlight the risk of unilateral disarmament and support for US cruise missiles in the UK. The CND magazine, Sanity, obtained a copy of the confidential action plan and revealed Pedley had been in communication with John Nott, the Minister of Defence about the plans to take on CND, and described the anti-CND material planned. They quoted Pedley as saying "It is especially worrying that a good many Young Conservatives have sympathy with CND's position." Sanity reported that the front organisation would "be roped into monitoring CND activities and outlines plans to train anti-CND organisers. The organisation was named as Youth for Multilateral Disarmament with Pedley as its first director and national organiser, and Mark Worrall working with him as secretary general.

=== Withdrawal from British Youth Council ===
The British Youth Council (BYC) was an umbrella organisation representing a multitude of youth organisations. As national vice-chairman of the YCs under Picton, Pedley negotiated alliances with non-political youth groups to boost representation on the BYC executive to an all-time high of three, including a vice-chairman position and a further representative on the BYC International Committee. The YCs came under pressure and although Pedley reported success in defeating the National Organisation of Labour Students (NOLS) candidate for the chairmanship and electing two Young Conservatives to the executive, he warned of "disturbing trends".

"The National Officers [of the YCs] are particularly concerned at the left-ward drift on political and social issues, such as disarmament, prostitution and unemployment. There is an inevitable question mark over the future of BYC following the departure of the extremely able chairman, John Collins (Scouts). It is hoped the new incumbent, Donny O'Rourke will be as pragmatic."

A year later, Pedley concluded the British Youth Council was under the control of its non-executive BYC staff members such as John Denham and Rex Osbourne, who owed their allegiances to the left and were manipulating the organisation to take an increasingly anti-government line. The Young Conservatives warned the new leadership that if they continued on their path, they would withdraw. In 1984, the Young Conservative National Advisory Committee voted to withdraw from the British Youth Council to deprive the organisation of legitimacy, with just one member, Richard Thomas, speaking and voting against the move (on the grounds that leaving would give an open non opposed platform for the left).

Following the Young Conservative decision, the Federation of Conservative Students followed suit. The FCS had long argued the BYC's funding should be cut. Previously, Picton and Pedley had defended the organisation and the funding had remained in place. After the decision to withdraw, Pedley resisted pressure from party chairman, John Gummer, who had been lobbied by various youth organisations to reverse the YC decision. Pedley withdrew his support for BYC funding and wrote to selected Conservative MPs, explaining the Young Conservative decision and ensuring the subject of funding was taken up in the House of Commons.

=== European Youth Framework (Standing Conference on Security and Cooperation in Europe) ===
As part of the Helsinki agreement, the Young Conservatives were involved in a parallel youth 'framework' of western youth organisations and Soviet bloc youth groups. Pedley attended a framework meeting in the Netherlands and was critical of attempts to find a 'third way' between communism and free enterprise, and participated in a demonstration from the conference floor in support of Solidarity, the Polish opposition organisation.

=== Far right infiltration ===
In 1981, Pedley backed up Picton's warnings about right-wing activity in some Young Conservative branches and in particular the Greater London Young Conservatives (GLYC). In 1982, following a series of incidents involving far-right activity, Pedley set up a Committee of Enquiry, a sub-committee of the National Advisory Committee and chaired by Demitri Coryton Argyropulo, a Surrey county councillor and former national vice-chairman.

Draft report
The committee's draft report was leaked at the 1983 Party Conference and appeared on the front page of The Observer, competing with the breaking news of Cecil Parkinson's affair with Sarah Keyes. The draft report became a subject of intense media interest and the BBC Panorama team began an investigation into far right links, resulting in a controversial programme called "Maggie's Militant Tendency" which was broadcast in January 1984.

Final report
The final YC report on right wing activity was finalised by Argyropulo's sub committee in January 1984 and approved by the YC national advisory committee. The final report was never published and did not form the basis of the Panorama programme.

Libel action – Maggie's Militant Tendency
Argyropulo was to have appeared on Panorama but was forced to pull out. Pedley agreed to be interviewed on the Panorama programme along with other Conservatives including the party chairman and some of the MPs accused of having links to right wing groups. Neil Hamilton, Harvey Proctor and Gerald Howarth sued both the BBC and Pedley, alleging the statements made amounted to calling them fascists. Pedley and the BBC denied they had called the MPs fascists and resisted the action. In early 1986, Proctor abruptly dropped his libel action against Pedley and the BBC. The case against the BBC involving Howarth and Hamilton proceeded to court, but before the cross examination of Hamilton's testimony began, the BBC Board of Governors instructed the BBC management to settle the case.

Pedley announced he would continue the case and declined settlement terms. Hamilton and Howarth announced they were withdrawing. In court, the judge ruled in Pedley's favour and Hamilton and Howarth were ordered to pay Pedley's costs and were debarred from alleging libel. Pedley was given leave to return to Court should they repeat the charge.

Libel actions against the Daily Telegraph, Sunday Telegraph and Alistair McAlpine
Pedley came under sustained attack from supporters of Neil Hamilton in the aftermath of the 1986 court case.

In 1993, Pedley was the target of smear campaign in the Sunday Telegraph and the Sunday Express in an attempt to stop him proposing a motion at the Conservative Party Conference. The Mandrake column in the Telegraph alleged he had personally written the YC Report and had libelled Hamilton. The claims were repeated by Alistair McAlpine in his Express column, which went further and called for Pedley to be banned. Pedley instituted libel proceedings against both the Sunday Telegraph and McAlpine. Both apologised.

A further libel against Pedley occurred in 1994, when supporters of Hamilton, resisting pressures for Hamilton to resign as minister, blamed Pedley supporters for exacting revenge on Hamilton. The Daily Telegraph ran as it main front-page story a piece placing Pedley at the centre of the unfolding drama. The paper quoted a close Hamilton friend as saying, "This has turned into a factional fight with the [Tory] left trying to force him out." Anger was directed at David Hunt (Minister for Open Government) who they regarded as instrumental in destroying Hamilton's chances of staying on. "Mr Hunt has clashed with Mr Hamilton before, most notably over the cabinet minister's patronage of Mr Phil Pedley." The article went on to imply that Hamilton had won his case of libel against Pedley. Pedley issued libel proceedings and the Telegraph issued an apology. "We may have given the false impression that Pedley lost that action. In fact Mr Hamilton discontinued it.... on terms debarring him from taking further proceedings against Mr Pedley... Mr Hamilton was ordered to pay Mr Pedley's costs. We apologise to Mr Pedley.

=== Falklands ===
During Pedley's tenure as chairman, the Argentine military invaded the Falklands causing a crisis for the Thatcher government. Conservative Central Office canvassed each section of the party for its opinion on different scenarios ranging from negotiated surrender to airstrikes on the Argentine mainland. Pedley issued a press release stating;

"The invasion of the Falklands illustrates a classic case of the failure to maintain a deterrence. We announced the withdrawal of HMS Endurance and the Argentine Junta misread our intentions. In the wake of the appalling Argentine aggression, Conservative Central Office have canvassed all sectors of the voluntary Party for their opinion. In the YCs ... our stance is clear. This aggression cannot stand ... air strikes against the Argentine mainland no, but the Falkland islanders must be liberated, by force if necessary. We stand foursquare behind Margaret Thatcher's Government in this difficult time for Britain and of course, the Falkland islanders."

=== South Africa ===
Pedley attempted to forge links with the moderate Progressive Federal Party in South Africa. He banned the South African Embassy from holding a reception for conference delegates at the national YC Conference, stating:

"We have no wish to partake of canapes and chardonnay with a bunch of racist apologists and BOSS operatives. We don't support further sanctions but our stance on South Africa is simple ... one man, one vote; a free press; a free judiciary and free enterprise is what the Young Conservatives support for South Africa, an inclusive system which does not exclude people on the basis of race."

=== Northern Ireland links to moderate Unionists ===
The Secretary of State for Northern Ireland, James Prior, was attempting to introduce 'rolling devolution' to Northern Ireland despite opposition from the right wing of the Conservative Party. The Monday Club believed Northern Ireland should be integrated into the United Kingdom with no 'regional' assembly. Prior published a white paper, Northern Ireland: A Framework for Devolution which proposed what was referred to as partial or rolling devolution. Harvey Proctor, as Secretary of the Monday Club Northern Ireland Policy Committee, attacked the plans for an Assembly and earned the praise of Ulster Unionist leadership, in particular Ulster Unionist Party Leader James Molyneux (later Lord Molyneaux) and the then Ulster Unionist Chief Whip and MP for East Londonderry, Willie Ross, who were opposed to an Assembly.

Elements of the Ulster Unionists were supportive of Prior. In consultations with Prior and Nick Scott, Pedley discussed reactivating Young Ulster Unionists' representation to the Young Conservative National Advisory Committee. The Young Ulster Unionists were led by moderates and Pedley instructed the national organiser of the Young Conservatives, Mark Worrall, to initiate secret talks with the former chairman of the Young Ulster Unionists, the moderate Edgar Graham. Worrall was a former President of Queen's University Belfast Students' Union and had extensive contacts with moderate Unionists. The intention was to reactivate lapsed Ulster Unionist representation on the Young Conservative national advisory committee as allowed for in the YC constitution, thereby providing a platform for moderate unionism and support for the Assembly within the Party, and countering Monday Club agitation. This initiative came to an end with the assassination of Edgar Graham by the IRA in December 1983. Pedley and a small delegation from the Young Conservative national advisory committee attended Graham's memorial service in Belfast and, a month later, Pedley opened the 24th National YC Conference with a tribute to Graham and a one-minute silence.

== Parliamentary candidate ==
In 1983, Pedley was adopted as prospective parliamentary candidate for the Halton constituency in Cheshire, a new constituency based on Widnes and Runcorn. In the election, he came second to the sitting Labour MP, Gordon Oakes. During the election campaign, Pedley was supported by the Defence Minister, Michael Heseltine. Pedley visited the Burtonwood peace camp and using a tannoy, challenged CND to stand in the election. "You say this is the nuclear election… well here's your chance. But you won't stand will you? Why, because you know the Conservatives will win the General election."

General Election 1983: Halton
| Party | Candidate | Votes | % | ±% |
|---|---|---|---|---|
| Labour | Gordon Oakes | 24,752 | 46.4 | N/A |
| Conservative | P.M. Pedley | 17,923 | 33.6 | N/A |
| SDP | T.R. Tilling | 10,649 | 20.0 | N/A |
| Majority | | 6,829 | 12.8 | N/A |
| Turnout | | 53,324 | 73.3 | N/A |
| Labour win (new seat) | | | | |

== National Conservative Party positions ==
Pedley served on a number of Party committees:

- Party's National Executive (NUEC) from 1979 to 1987
- Standing Advisory Committee on Parliamentary Candidates
- Standing Advisory Committee on Party Policy (chaired by Sir Keith Joseph)
- Conservative Party representative on the all-party Joint Committee Against Racism, co-chaired by Eric Pickles and Joan Lestor.

== Wirral Council ==
In 1986, Pedley was elected to the Wirral Council as the Conservative member for the Hoylake and West Kirby Ward. He was appointed environmental spokesman and served on the Education and Leisure Committees. Pedley supported the retention of grammar schools in the Wirral.

== Tory Reform Group ==
Pedley succeeded Sue Woodroof as chairman of the Tory Reform Group and concentrated on organisational matters.

=== Social Market Foundation ===
As a committee member and then chairman of the Tory Reform Group, Pedley promoted links with the new Social Market Foundation, run by former Social Democratic Party members Danny Finkelstein and Rick Nye. Pedley was a regular visitor to the SMF and a series of pamphlets and joint seminars were held between TRG and the SMF. Pedley and Finkelstein attended a Konrad Adenauer Institute policy visit to Berlin and the Christian Democrat conference in Hamburg.

=== Conservative Party leadership 1997 ===
On 2 May 1997, John Major resigned as leader of the Conservatives, following the party's crushing defeat and the manoeuvring for his succession began. The Tory Reform Group's parliamentary supporters contained three potential leadership candidates: Michael Heseltine, Ken Clarke and Stephen Dorrell. Pedley and the TRG executive wished to make their office facilities and phone lines available to Heseltine and offered these to Michael Mates MP. However, when Heseltine's heart attack ruled him out, Pedley switched support to Clarke and hosted a meeting between Mates and Clarke at the TRG offices to bring the two camps together. Dorrell decided to back Clarke.

=== Appointment of a national director ===
Pedley attempted to reorganise the TRG on a more professional footing and move the organisation away from youth politics by recruiting Clare Whelan as national director. Pedley entered into negotiations with Michael Welsh of the Conservative Mainstream Group to share resources and promote joint initiatives to secure the group's future.

== Housing for Wales ==
=== Deputy chairman ===
Housing for Wales (Tai Cymru) was the Welsh national quango charged with delivering social housing via housing associations throughout Wales. Pedley was appointed to the Board of Housing for Wales by the Secretary of State for Wales, David Hunt, and reappointed by John Redwood. He served two terms under the chairman, Sir John Allen, until the organisation was subsumed into the new devolved Assembly Government. Pedley succeeded Jonathan Evans as the deputy chairman.

=== Chairman, Audit Committee ===
The Housing for Wales budget for social housing operations made it one of the largest in financial terms. For example, in 1991–92 the money allocated for expenditure amounted to £175 million. During his term on the board, Pedley was chairman of the audit committee. Housing for Wales was unaffected by the financial irregularities that affected the other large Welsh quangos – the Welsh Development Agency, the Development Board for Rural Wales and Health Promotion Wales.

=== Right to buy ===
Pedley was a supporter of the 'right to buy' concept of home ownership for disadvantaged families in Wales. Housing for Wales introduced a scheme to give tenants the ability to purchase a property at 70% of its cost, with the remaining 30% funded by an interest-free loan from the housing association.

== Chairman, 'Conservatives Say Yes' – Welsh Assembly ==
As a former Welsh constituency officer (chairman of Delyn Conservative Association and treasurer of the North Wales Euro Constituency) and a leading Conservative quango appointee, Pedley took a leading role in the 1997 Referendum campaign on Welsh devolution. He chaired the Conservative Say Yes campaign and called for Welsh Conservatives to seize the opportunity. In an article in the Western Mail, Pedley stated,

"For the Conservatives in Wales, an Assembly could prove a godsend. We play practically no part in the political life of Wales. Can this be right for a Party which represents between a fifth and a third of welsh voters. The elections to the Assembly involve a degree of proportional representation which will guarantee the Conservatives a strong voice..."

Pedley dismissed claims devolution would cause the break-up of the Union. The Western Mail reported, "Mr Pedley ridiculed the idea Plaid Cymru could gain power through the Assembly and break up the UK." Pedley said that he understood the fear, "but is it a real threat? I cannot see any situation where nationalists are going to sweep to a majority. Plaid gets less votes than the Conservatives." He was backed on this point by Sir Wyn Roberts who agreed devolution would not break up the UK. Further support came from Alan Clark and Stephen Dorrell.

At a press conference held at the Yes for Wales campaign, Pedley again urged Conservatives to vote Yes and warned that the party would face oblivion in Wales if it did not take advantage of the opportunity. He denounced talk of a Conservative boycott of the Assembly.

"If we don't get it right, I think people like me will be stuffed and mounted in a museum in Cardiff as 'Welsh Conservative now extinct.'"

Pedley welcomed Colwyn Philipps, 3rd Viscount St Davids as the patron of the Welsh Conservatives Say Yes campaign, stating,

"The Viscount's family motto says it all... Ducit Amor Patriae – Patriotism is my motive. It is patriotism that motivates us: a belief that the union can be strengthened, not weakened by devolution."

In the House of Commons, the Delyn MP, David Hanson, referring to Pedley's role in the Yes campaign and his belief an elected Assembly should replace the quango, said "One of my constituents, Mr. Philip Pedley of Cilcain, is an active Conservative who has fought three general elections for his party. He was appointed without one vote in Wales because he had contested English seats during three general elections. Mr. Pedley was appointed deputy chairman of Housing for Wales—Tai Cymru. He has benefited from the quango system. However, he voted for the assembly. Even as a Conservative, he went on a platform in my constituency and said that he recognised that the quango state was untenable and needed to be reformed for a democratic Wales and a democratic future."

In 1998, Pedley backed the winning candidate Rod Richards in the postal ballot for the leadership for Welsh Conservatives.
