= Iain Picton =

Iain Sutherland Picton (31 August 1951 – 9 August 1991) was a political activist in the Conservative Party, representing the One Nation tradition Toryism, and a television producer.

== Federation of Conservative Students and National Union of Students ==
Picton was active in the Liverpool University Branch of the Federation of Conservative Students between 1970 and 1975. Liverpool University FCS was dominated by the moderate faction in the Conservative Party and a major player in the Students' Union. He became the sabbatical President of Liverpool Students Union and a delegate to the National Union of Students. He rose to become a National Vice-Chairman of FCS (1974–75) on the moderate ticket and was elected to the Finance Committee of the NUS, the first Tory in two decades.

== Conservative Party Youth and Community Officer ==
After the Conservative defeat in the 1974 General Elections, the Conservative Party created a number of staff positions charged with building relations with elements of the community the Party considered vital to its electoral success, such as voluntary groups and ethnic minorities. Picton was recruited to head up the Youth & Community position in the North West Region of England, working under the Area Agent, David Smith from 1975 to 1979.

== Parliamentary candidate ==
In the 1979 General Election Picton stood as the Conservative Candidate in Rochdale, a Liberal – Labour marginal, held by Cyril Smith. The election witnessed clashes between Young Conservatives and the supporters of the National Front Candidate, Jim Merrick. Merrick was a former Conservative Councillor from Bradford who had been expelled by the Conservatives in 1970 and gone on to found the British Campaign to Stop Immigration.

General Election 1979: Rochdale
Party	Candidate	Votes	%	±%
Liberal	Cyril Smith	22,172	45.0	
Labour	J. Connell	16,878	34.3	
Conservative	I. Picton	9,494	19.3	
National Front	J. Merrick	690	1.4	
Majority		5,294	10.8	
Turnout			73.66	
Liberal hold		Swing		

== Young Conservatives ==
Picton joined the Young Conservatives in 1965 and became Secretary and then Chairman of Knebworth Young Conservatives Hertfordshire. Picton became Chairman of the North West Area Young Conservatives in 1978 and served two terms as National Vice-Chairman of the Young Conservatives, first under Bob Hughes and then Eric Pickles, with responsibility for Campaigning and International work on the British Youth Council. In 1981 he was elected National Chairman of the Young Conservatives on the moderate slate.

Right-wing infiltration

Picton grew concerned with signs of organised extreme right wing infiltration and collaboration with them by sympathisers in the Conservative Party. The Daily Telegraph reported: 'The National Chairman of the Young Conservatives, Mr Iain Picton is convinced that there is a problem and that action has to be taken to tackle it.' Picton stated: If I ever find any evidence of National Front infiltration, I shall move everything to make sure these people are thrown out.'

The Daily Telegraph listed examples of National Front links in Coventry, West London, Petts Wood, South Shields, Preston and the Solent area of Hampshire. The Telegraph referred to 'particular worries' about some Federation of Conservative Students branches which 'sent a delegation containing students with skinhead haircuts, braces and union-jack badges to the federation's conference.'

Picton believed that unless the issue was confronted, the Young Conservative movement 'could suffer serious political and structural damage.' Picton attacked the National Front, calling them racists. 'They are dangerous, they are pro-racist where we are anti, and they are anti-democratic where we are pro'. Picton's lieutenant, National vice-chairman, Phil Pedley stated: 'So far we have only discovered a handful of people but they appear to be working to some sort of a strategy.'

Countering CND

Under Picton's Chairmanship the National Young Conservatives sought to counter the influence of the Campaign for Nuclear Disarmament attempts to influence Young Conservative Branches and established Youth for Multilateral Disarmament under Phil Pedley.

Youth Unemployment

The Young Conservatives took a leading role in calling for the Government to do more for young unemployed and charged another National vice-chairman, Peter 'Chalkie' White with the responsibility of developing the YC's stance, resulting in a policy paper "Britain's Youth – What Future?" Picton stepped up his criticisms of the Conservative Government's attitude after the 1981 Toxteth riots in Picton's adopted city of Liverpool.

Picton was regarded with disdain by many on the right of the Party including Thatcher's PPS, Ian Gow, who, prior to a meeting between Picton and the Prime Minister wrote: "can the unspeakable Iain Picton come quarter of an hour early?...I gave him a drink at the House last night. He is bearded and unemployed".

Get on your bike

At the 1981 Conservative Party Conference in Blackpool, it was Picton's contribution to the debate on Unemployment, that provoked Norman Tebbit's famous response. In the aftermath of the 1981 riots in Handsworth and Brixton, Tebbit responded to Picton's suggestion that rioting was the natural reaction to unemployment by telling the Conference I grew up in the '30s with an unemployed father. He didn't riot. He got on his bike and looked for work, and he kept looking till he found it.' This response was the origin of the slogan "On yer bike!".

== Tory Reform Group ==
Unemployment and compassionate Conservatism remained a theme after Picton's chairmanship of the Young Conservatives and he returned to it when elected chairman of the Tory Reform Group.

In May 1985, the Tory Reform Group criticised the Government's handling of unemployment and Picton's press release on the issue was referred to in Prime Minister's Questions. At the 1985 Conservative Party Conference he clashed again with Norman Tebbit, who dismissed activists' concerns as being worries about presentational issues. Picton said: "When Conservatives say presentation, they often mean policy. People are really worried.' He was backed by Northern Ireland Secretary Jim Prior: "I sometimes think the modern Conservative party lacks understanding and that compassion has become a dirty word".

Picton returned to the theme of decaying inner cities and the risk of rioting in 1985 with a Tory Reform Group press-release calling for a rejuvenation of city centres which were "embarrassingly tatty, unkempt and in part positively slum-like." and suggested it might take another riot to get the Government to act. The cover of the Tory Reform Group's magazine 'Reformer' reproduced newspaper cuttings of the Birmingham Handsworth riots with the headline: 'The Nation in Peril?'

Anti Apartheid

In 1986 Picton criticised the Conservative Government's reluctance to join other Commonwealth countries in imposing sanctions against South Africa. Speaking on behalf of the Tory Reform Group. The Associated Press reported: "The Tory Reform Group, to the left of Mrs. Thatcher in her governing Conservative Party, joined those pressuring the prime minister to reverse herself and approve tough sanctions against South Africa at a meeting of seven Commonwealth nations next week." Picton was quoted as saying; "...economic, strategic and political interests all require us to impose substantial sanctions against South Africa".

== Combatting the SDP ==
In 1987 Picton published a Tory Reform Group pamphlet: Building One Nation: why the 'Alliance' has nothing to offer', a detailed argument why One Nation Tories should remain the Conservative Party to realise their objectives and not join the SDP.

== Lambeth Council ==
Iain Picton stood as a Conservative Candidate in the 1982 Lambeth Council elections and was elected for St Leonard's Ward with a majority of 1,200 votes over his nearest challenger (SDP). Picton served one term as Councillor and was succeeded as Conservative Councillor for the St Leonard's ward by John Bercow.
