= Conservative Party Board =

British political party organization

- Founded: 1834
- Headquarters: 4 Matthew Parker Street, Westminster, England, United Kingdom
- Key people: Kevin Hollinrake, Board Chairman; Graham Edwards, Treasurer; Roger Pratt, Secretary
- Website: conservatives.com

The Conservative Party Board is the national governing body of the Conservative Party of the United Kingdom. It is responsible for operational matters such as fundraising, membership, candidates, and internal elections. It is made up of members from each section of the party: voluntary, political and professional. The board meets once a month and works closely with Conservative Campaign Headquarters elected representatives and the voluntary membership mainly through a number of management sub-committees.

== Members ==
Board
Office	Incumbent
Chairman of the board Chairman of the Conservative Party	Kevin Hollinrake
Chairman of the National Conservative Convention; Deputy chairman of the board	Julian Ellacott
Deputy chairman of the party	Matt Vickers
Treasurer of the Conservative Party	Graham Edwards
President of the National Conservative Convention	Michael Winstanley
Vice president of the National Conservative Convention	Fleur Butler
Vice president of the National Conservative Convention	John Belsey
Vice president of the National Conservative Convention	Stewart Harper
Senior member of the professional staff of the party	Alan Mabbutt
Chairman of the Conservative Councillors’ Association	Cllr John Cope
Chairman of the Scottish Conservative Party	Craig Hoy
Chairman of the Welsh Conservative Party	Tomos Davies
Nominated by the leader with endorsement by the board	Matt Wright
Board appointment with approval of the leader	Katy Bourne
Chairman of the Association of Conservative Peers	Michael Forsyth, Baron Forsyth of Drumlean
Chairman of the 1922 Committee	Bob Blackman
Elected by the 1922 Committee	John Whittingdale
Elected by the 1922 Committee	Alicia Kearns
Elected by the 1922 Committee	Mark Garnier
Secretary to the board	Roger Pratt
