= Electoral history of the Conservative Party (UK) =

Elections featuring UK political party

The Conservative Party, officially the Conservative and Unionist Party and also known colloquially as the Tories, is one of the two main political parties in the United Kingdom, along with the Labour Party, and has been described as both right-wing and centre-right.

This article encompasses detailed results of previous UK general elections, Police and Crime Commissioner elections, devolved national elections, devolved London elections and European Parliament elections which the Conservative Party have participated in.

== Background ==
The Conservative Party is currently the primary opposition party in the United Kingdom. On the political spectrum the party has been described as right-wing by various sources and as centre-right by others, and encompasses various ideological factions including one-nation conservatives, Thatcherites, and traditionalist conservatives. It holds the annual Conservative Party Conference. It was founded in 1834 from the Tory Party and was one of two dominant political parties in the 19th century, along with the Liberal Party. In 1912 the Liberal Unionist Party merged with the party to form the Conservative and Unionist Party. Since the 1920s the Labour Party emerged to be the Conservatives' main rival and the Conservative–Labour political rivalry has shaped modern British politics for the last century.

== National results ==
=== UK general elections ===
United Kingdom general elections are held under the first past the post voting system. Each constituency in the United Kingdom will elect one Member of Parliament; overall 650 Members of Parliament are currently elected at each election. Following the Dissolution and Calling of Parliament Act 2022, the date of the general election is at the discretion of the prime minister within a five-year period from the last general election. The previous general election was held on 4 July 2024.

In the 1931 general election, the Conservatives earned their best result to date, by vote share (55.5%) and seat number (474). In the post-war era, the 1983 general election was the most successful for the Conservatives in terms of seats won (397), whereas 1955 was the most successful election for vote share (49.7%). However, the 1997 general election was the least successful election since 1918 for the Conservatives, winning 165 seats and gaining 30.7% of the vote.

This chart shows the electoral performance of the Conservative Party in each general election since 1835.

For results of the Tories, the party's predecessor, see here.

Parliament of the United Kingdom
Election	Leader	Votes		Seats			Position	Government	Ref
Election	Leader	No.	Share	No.	±	Share	Position	Government	Ref
1835	Robert Peel	261,269	40.8%	273 / 658	▲98	41.5%	2nd	Whig	
1837	Robert Peel	379,694	48.3%	314 / 658	▲41	47.7%	2nd	Whig	
1841	Robert Peel	379,694	56.9%	367 / 658	▲53	55.8%	▲1st	Conservative	
1847	Earl of Derby	205,481	42.7%	325 / 656 Includes Peelites	▼42	49.5%	1st	Whig	
1852	Earl of Derby	311,481	41.9%	330 / 654 Includes Peelites	▲5	50.5%	1st	Conservative	
1857	Earl of Derby	239,712	34.0%	264 / 654	▼66	40.4%	▼2nd	Whig	
1859	Earl of Derby	193,232	34.3%	298 / 654	▲34	45.6%	2nd	Whig	
1865	Earl of Derby	346,035	40.5%	289 / 658	▼9	43.9%	2nd	Liberal	
1868 (Note: The first election held under the Reform Act 1867.)	Benjamin Disraeli	903,318	38.4%	271 / 658	▼18	41.2%	2nd	Liberal	
1874	Benjamin Disraeli	1,091,708	44.3%	350 / 652	▲79	53.7%	▲1st	Conservative	
1880	Benjamin Disraeli	1,462,351	42.5%	237 / 652	▼113	36.3%	▼2nd	Liberal	
1885 (Note: The first election held under the Representation of the People Act 1884 and the Redistribution of Seats Act 1885.)	Marquess of Salisbury	1,869,560	43.4%	247 / 670	▲10	36.9%	2nd	Liberal minority	
1886	Marquess of Salisbury	1,417,627	51.4%	393 / 670	▲146	58.7%	▲1st	Conservative–Liberal Unionist	
1892	Marquess of Salisbury	2,028,586	47.0%	314 / 670	▼79	46.9%	▼2nd	Liberal	
1895	Marquess of Salisbury	1,759,484	49.3%	411 / 670	▲97	61.3%	▲1st	Conservative–Liberal Unionist	
1900	Marquess of Salisbury	1,637,683	50.2%	402 / 670	▼9	60.0%	1st	Conservative–Liberal Unionist	
1906	Arthur Balfour	2,278,076	43.4%	156 / 670	▼246	23.3%	▼2nd	Liberal	
January 1910	Arthur Balfour	2,919,236	46.8%	272 / 670	▲116	40.6%	2nd	Liberal minority	
December 1910	Arthur Balfour	2,270,753	46.6%	271 / 670	▼1	40.5%	2nd	Liberal minority	
Merged with Liberal Unionist Party in 1912 to become the Conservative and Unionist Party
1918 (Note: The first election held under the Representation of the People Act 1918 in which all men over 21, and most women over the age of 30 could vote, and therefore a much larger electorate.)	Bonar Law	4,003,848	38.4%	379 / 707 332 elected with Coupon	▲108	53.6%	▲1st	Coalition Liberal–Conservative	
1922	Bonar Law	5,294,465	38.5%	344 / 615	▼35	55.9%	1st	Conservative	
1923	Stanley Baldwin	5,286,159	38.0%	258 / 625	▼86	41.3%	1st	Labour minority	
1924	Stanley Baldwin	7,418,983	46.8%	412 / 615	▲124	67.0%	1st	Conservative	
1929 (Note: The first election held under the Representation of the People Act 1928 which gave all women aged over 21 the vote.)	Stanley Baldwin	8,252,527	38.1%	260 / 615	▼152	42.3%	▼2nd	Labour minority	
1931	Stanley Baldwin	11,377,022	55.0%	470 / 615	▲210	76.4%	▲1st	Conservative–Liberal–National Labour	
1935	Stanley Baldwin	10,025,083	47.8%	386 / 615	▼83	62.8%	1st	Conservative–Liberal National–National Labour	
1945	Winston Churchill	8,716,211	36.2%	197 / 640	▼189	30.8%	▼2nd	Labour	
1950	Winston Churchill	12,494,404	43.4%	298 / 625	▲90	47.7%	2nd	Labour	
1951	Winston Churchill	13,717,851	48.0%	321 / 625	▲23	51.4%	▲1st	Conservative–National Liberal	
1955	Anthony Eden	13,310,891	49.7%	324 / 630	▲22	51.4%	1st	Conservative–National Liberal	
1959	Harold Macmillan	13,750,875	49.4%	345 / 630	▲21	54.8%	1st	Conservative–National Liberal	
1964	Alec Douglas-Home	12,002,642	43.4%	298 / 630	▼47	47.3%	▼2nd	Labour	
1966	Edward Heath	11,418,455	41.9%	250 / 630	▼48	39.7%	2nd	Labour	
1970 (Note: Franchise extended to all 18- to 20-year-olds under the Representation of the People Act 1969.)	Edward Heath	13,145,123	46.4%	330 / 630	▲80	52.4%	▲1st	Conservative	
February 1974	Edward Heath	11,872,180	37.9%	297 / 635	▼33	46.8%	▼2nd	Labour minority	
October 1974	Edward Heath	10,462,565	35.8%	277 / 635	▼20	43.6%	2nd	Labour	
1979	Margaret Thatcher	13,697,923	43.9%	339 / 635	▲62	53.4%	▲1st	Conservative	
1983	Margaret Thatcher	13,012,316	42.4%	397 / 650	▲38	61.1%	1st	Conservative	
1987	Margaret Thatcher	13,760,935	42.2%	376 / 650	▼21	57.8%	1st	Conservative	
1992	John Major	14,093,007	41.9%	336 / 651	▼40	51.6%	1st	Conservative	
1997	John Major	9,600,943	30.7%	165 / 659	▼171	25.0%	▼2nd	Labour	
2001	William Hague	8,357,615	31.7%	166 / 659	▲1	25.2%	2nd	Labour	
2005	Michael Howard	8,785,941	32.4%	198 / 646	▲32	30.7%	2nd	Labour	
2010	David Cameron	10,703,654	36.1%	306 / 650	▲96	47.1%	▲1st	Conservative–Liberal Democrats	
2015	David Cameron	11,299,609	36.8%	330 / 650	▲24	50.8%	1st	Conservative	
2017	Theresa May	13,636,684	42.3%	317 / 650	▼13	48.8%	1st	Conservative minority with DUP confidence and supply	
2019	Boris Johnson	13,966,454	43.6%	365 / 650	▲48	56.2%	1st	Conservative	
2024	Rishi Sunak	6,827,311	23.7%	121 / 650	▼251	18.6%	▼2nd	Labour	

=== Police and Crime Commissioner elections ===
Election	Leader	Votes		Commissioners			Position
Election	Leader	No.	Share	No.	±	Share	Position
2012	David Cameron	1,480,323	27.6%	16 / 41		34.8%	1st
2016	David Cameron	2,601,560	29.3%	20 / 40	▲4	50.0%	1st
2021	Boris Johnson	4,900,501	44.5%	30 / 39	▲10	76.9%	1st
2024	Rishi Sunak	2,727,820	35.2%	19 / 37	▼11	51.4%	1st

== Devolved national elections ==
=== Scottish Parliament elections ===
Election	Leader	Votes (Constituency)		Votes (List)		Seats			Position	Government
Election	Leader	No.	Share	No.	Share	No.	±	Share	Position	Government
1999	David McLetchie	364,225	15.6%	359,109	15.4%	18 / 129		14.0%	3rd	Labour–Liberal Democrats
2003	David McLetchie	318,279	16.6%	296,929	15.6%	18 / 129	0	14.0%	3rd	Labour–Liberal Democrats
2007	Annabel Goldie	334,743	16.6%	284,005	13.9%	17 / 129	▼1	13.4%	3rd	Scottish National minority
2011	Annabel Goldie	276,652	13.9%	245,967	12.4%	15 / 129	▼2	11.6%	3rd	Scottish National
2016	Ruth Davidson	501,844	22.0%	524,222	22.9%	31 / 129	▲16	24.0%	▲2nd	Scottish National minority
2021	Douglas Ross	592,526	21.9%	637,131	23.5%	31 / 129	0	24.0%	2nd	Scottish National minority
2026	Russell Findlay	271,740	11.8%	271,550	11.8%	12 / 129	▼19	9.3%	▼5th	Scottish National minority

=== Senedd elections ===
Election	Leader	Votes (Constituency)		Votes (List)		Seats			Position	Government
Election	Leader	No.	Share	No.	Share	No.	±	Share	Position	Government
1999	Rod Richards	162,133	15.8%	168,206	16.5%	9 / 60		15.0%	3rd	Labour–Liberal Democrats
2003	Nick Bourne	169,832	19.9%	162,725	19.2%	11 / 60	▲2	18.3%	3rd	Labour
2007	Nick Bourne	218,739	22.4%	209,153	21.4%	12 / 60	▲1	20.0%	3rd	Labour–Plaid Cymru
2011	Nick Bourne	237,388	25.0%	213,773	22.5%	14 / 60	▲2	23.3%	▲2nd	Labour
2016	Andrew R. T. Davies	215,597	21.1%	190,846	18.8%	11 / 60	▼3	18.3%	▼3rd	Labour minority
2021	Andrew R. T. Davies	289,802	26.1%	278,560	25.1%	16 / 60	▲5	26.7%	▲2nd	Labour minority
2026	Darren Millar	Electoral system changed		134,926	10.7%	7 / 96	▼9		▼4th	

=== Northern Ireland devolved elections ===
Prior to 1973, the Ulster Unionist Party acted as the de facto Northern Ireland branch of the Conservative Party. The UUP's results may be seen here.

Election	Leader	Votes		Seats			Position	Government
Election	Leader	No.	Share	No.	±	Share	Position	Government
Elections to the Northern Ireland Forum in 1996
1996	Barbara Finney	3,595	0.48	0 / 110		0.0%	12th	Dissolution
Elections to the Northern Ireland Assembly from 1998
1998	Unknown	1,835	0.23	0 / 108	0	0.0%	▼14th	UUP–Sinn Féin
2003	Unknown	1,604	0.20	0 / 108	0	0.0%	14th	Dissolution
2007	Unknown	3,457	0.50	0 / 108	0	0.0%	▲10th	DUP–Sinn Féin
2011	Unknown	Did not contest election						DUP–Sinn Féin
2016	Alan Dunlop	2,554	0.40	0 / 108	0	0.0%	▼11th	DUP–Sinn Féin
2022	Matthew Robinson	Did not contest election						tbc

== Devolved London elections ==
=== London Mayoral elections ===
Election	Leader	Candidate	Votes (1st pref.)		Votes (run-off)		Position
Election	Leader	Candidate	No.	Share	No.	Share	Position
2000	William Hague	Steven Norris	464,434	27.1%	564,137	42.1%	2nd
2004	Michael Howard	Steven Norris	542,423	29.1%	667,180	44.6%	2nd
2008	David Cameron	Boris Johnson	1,043,761	43.2%	1,168,738	53.2%	▲1st
2012	David Cameron	Boris Johnson	971,931	44.0%	1,054,811	51.5%	1st
2016	David Cameron	Zac Goldsmith	909,755	35.0%	994,614	43.2%	▼2nd
2021	Boris Johnson	Shaun Bailey	893,051	35.3%	977,601	44.8%	2nd
2024	Rishi Sunak	Susan Hall	812,397	32.7%			2nd

=== London Assembly elections ===
Election	Leader	Assembly Leader	Votes (Constituency)		Votes (List)		Seats			Position
Election	Leader	Assembly Leader	No.	Share	No.	Share	No.	+	Share	Position
2000	William Hague	Eric Ollerenshaw	526,422	33.2%	481,053	29.0%	9 / 25		36.0%	1st
2004	Michael Howard	Bob Neill	562,047	31.2%	533,696	28.5%	9 / 25	0	36.0%	1st
2008	David Cameron	Richard Barnes	900,569	37.4%	835,535	34.1%	11 / 25	▲2	44.0%	1st
2012	David Cameron	James Cleverly	722,280	32.7%	708,528	32.0%	9 / 25	▼2	36.0%	▼2nd
2016	David Cameron	Gareth Bacon	812,415	31.1%	764,230	29.2%	8 / 25	▼1	32.0%	2nd
2021	Boris Johnson	Susan Hall	833,021	32.0%	795,081	30.7%	9 / 25	▲1	36.0%	2nd
2024	Rishi Sunak	Neil Garratt	673,036	27.2%	648,269	26.2%	8 / 25	▼1	32.0%	2nd

== Combined authority elections ==
Year	Leader	Mayoralties won	Change
2017	Theresa May	4 / 6	
2018	Theresa May	0 / 1	Steady
2019	Theresa May	0 / 1	Steady
2021	Boris Johnson	2 / 7	▼2
2024	Rishi Sunak	1 / 9	▼1

== European ==
=== European Parliament elections ===
Election	Party Group	Leader	Votes		Seats			Position
Election	Party Group	Leader	No.	Share	No.	±	Share	Position
1979	ED	Margaret Thatcher	6,508,492	48.4	60 / 81		75.0%	1st
1984	EPP	Margaret Thatcher	5,426,866	38.8	45 / 81	▼15	55.6%	1st
1989	EPP	Margaret Thatcher	5,331,077	34.7	32 / 81	▼13	39.5%	▼2nd
1994	EPP	John Major	4,274,122	26.8	18 / 87	▼13	20.7%	2nd
1999 (Note: Electoral system changed from first past the post to proportional representation.)	EPP-ED	William Hague	3,578,218	35.8	36 / 87	▲18	41.4%	▲1st
2004	EPP-ED	Michael Howard	4,397,087	26.7	27 / 78	▼8	34.6%	1st
2009 (Note: Includes 82,892 votes and 1 seat gained from the UCUNF alliance)	ECR	David Cameron	4,281,286	27.7	26 / 72	▲1	36.1%	1st
2014	ECR	David Cameron	3,792,549	23.1	19 / 73	▼7	26.0%	▼3rd
2019	ECR	Theresa May	1,512,809	8.8	4 / 73	▼15	5.5%	▼5th
