= Raheem Kassam =

British political activist (born 1986)

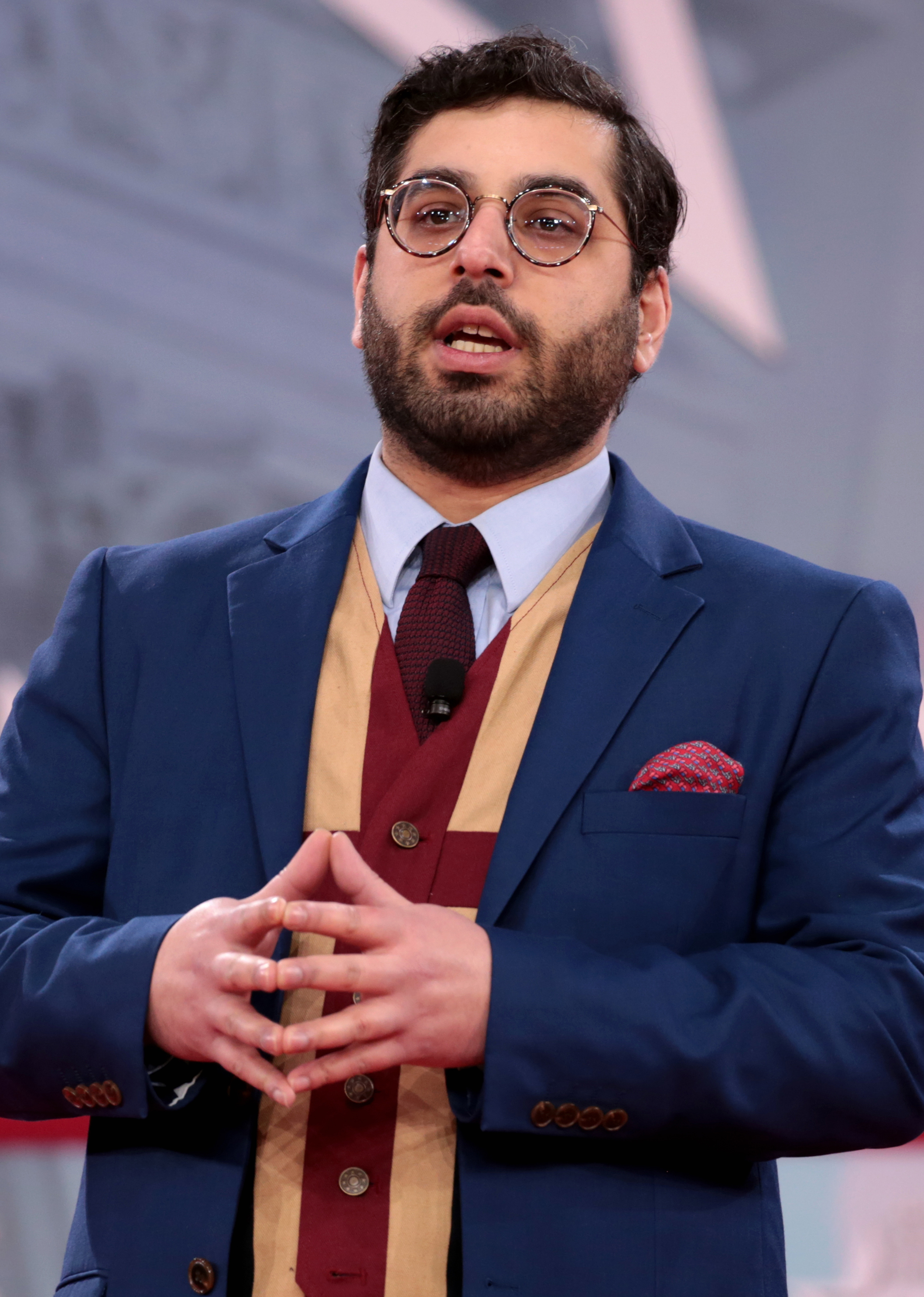
- At the 2018 CPAC
- Born: 1 August 1986 (age 40); London, England
- Education: University of Westminster
- Political party: UK Independence Party (2014–2019)

Raheem J. Kassam (born 1 August 1986) is a British political activist, former editor-in-chief of Breitbart News London, and former chief adviser to former UK Independence Party (UKIP) leader Nigel Farage. Kassam ran in the party's November 2016 leadership election before dropping out of the race on 31 October 2016. He is the former global editor-in-chief of Human Events and most recently became the editor-in-chief of The National Pulse. He has been described as far-right and right-wing by several media publications. He has written two books. He stood for leadership in the 2016 UKIP Leadership Campaign, but stood down after failing to secure any support of note.

== Early life and education ==
Kassam was born in the Hammersmith Hospital in White City, West London. His parents were Tanzanian Muslim immigrants of Indian origin from Hillingdon. He was raised an Ismaili Shia Muslim but wrote in 2016 that he had not been a practising Muslim for over a decade. Kassam was formerly an atheist, stating that Christopher Hitchens' rejection of religious faith ("religions are versions of the same untruth") inspired him. He now identifies as a Christian. Kassam was educated at Bishopshalt School, a state comprehensive school in Uxbridge and the independent St Helen's College, Hillingdon, and then studied politics at the University of Westminster.

Kassam briefly worked for the American financial services firm Lehman Brothers before it went bankrupt in 2008.

== Career ==
Kassam was a national executive board member of the youth movement Conservative Future and director of campus anti-extremism group Student Rights, and campaigned against the London School of Economics for accepting money from Gaddafi's Libya; the university's director Howard Davies would later resign when new revelations revealed the extent of the institution's relationship with the Gaddafi regime. In a 2011 interview, Kassam named his idols as Michael Gove, Margaret Thatcher and Barry Goldwater, and spoke of his admiration for the United States's free markets. He has called his former university, the University of Westminster, a "hotbed of radical Islam", citing the fact that Jihadi John was at his campus as evidence.

In 2011, Kassam was employed as campaigns director at the Henry Jackson Society, a neoconservative foreign policy think-tank.

Kassam managed electoral campaigns in the UK and US, and was Executive Editor of The Commentator blogging platform, but left the organisation after falling out with the founding editor, Robin Shepherd, who described Kassam as "a danger to British democracy, and the rule of law". He has been a member of conservative think tanks such as the Bow Group, the neoconservative Henry Jackson Society, the Gatestone Institute and the Middle East Forum, and was involved in an attempted foundation of the UK version of the Tea Party movement. Kassam was a supporter of the controversial Young Britons' Foundation, described by its founder as a "conservative madrasa" which later shut down due to allegations of misconduct against director Mark Clarke. He and James Delingpole set up the London edition of the American far-right news outlet Breitbart News. Kassam left Breitbart in May 2018.

In June 2018, Kassam helped organise and held a speech at a 10,000-people strong "Free Tommy" demonstration in London in support of counter-jihad activist Tommy Robinson.

In 2018, Kassam joined the Institut des sciences sociales, économiques et politiques (Institute of Social, Economic and Political Sciences), founded by politicians in the far-right National Front Marion Maréchal-Le Pen and Thibaut Monnier, in Lyon, France.

In March 2019, Kassam and lawyer Will Chamberlain purchased Human Events, a conservative American digital-only publication, from Salem Media Group for $300,000. Kassam became Global editor-in-chief of Human Events when it was re-launched on 1 May. Human Events announced that Kassam would be leaving the outlet on 8 August.

In July 2019, the Australian Labor Party called for Kassam to be banned from entering the country. Shadow Home Affairs Minister Senator Kristina Keneally said, "We should not allow career bigots — a person who spreads hate speech about Muslims, about women, about gay and lesbian people — to enter our country with the express intent of undermining equity and equality."

Also in July 2019, the Board of Deputies of British Jews accused Kassam of anti-semitism after he promoted a far-right conspiracy. Kassam falsely stated that Hungarian and American investor and philanthropist George Soros, was not Jewish and was a "Nazi accomplice". The Board of Deputies accused Kassam of "knowingly or not… spreading false antisemitic conspiracy theories".

In October 2019, Kassam began co-hosting War Room: Impeachment, a daily radio show and podcast with Steve Bannon, to nudge the White House and its allies into taking a more focused and aggressive posture to counteract the impeachment inquiry against Donald Trump.

While ballots were being counted in the 2020 election, Kassam promoted claims by Donald Trump intended to cast doubt on the legitimacy of the election.

== Political views ==
Kassam has described himself as a nationalist. Kassam's politics have frequently been described as far-right by mainstream commentators and sources. He has also been described by media and academic sources as a figure in the alt-right. When running for leader in 2016, Kassam supported the repeal of a ban on former members of the National Front and British National Party white nationalist parties from joining UKIP.

Kassam has described Islam as a "fascistic and totalitarian ideology", described the Quran as "fundamentally evil", stated that "we are at war with Shari'a" and has supported curbing Muslim immigration to the United Kingdom. He has been described as a part of the counter-jihad movement.

Kassam's political and media strategies have been described as "shock and awful" tactics. Kassam has been a persistent critic of Labour Party Mayor of London Sadiq Khan, accusing him of turning the city into a "shithole" and having links to terrorism and extremism.

== UK Independence Party ==
Following his period with the Conservative Party, Kassam became a UK Independence Party voter in late 2013, joined the party early in the following year, and soon became Nigel Farage's senior adviser.

=== Leadership candidate ===
Following the resignation of Diane James as UKIP leader in October 2016, Kassam launched a campaign to become the new leader. On announcing his bid, he stated that he wanted to "stop infighting within UKIP", "address the deep cultural and social divides in this country", and "to become the real opposition and put this feckless Labour Party to bed." His campaign slogan was "Make UKIP great again". In an interview with Evan Davis on the BBC's Newsnight, Kassam announced his intentions to resolve UKIP's "existential crisis" and pledged to increase UKIP's membership to 100,000.

Kassam's activity on social media has attracted negative attention. In June 2016 he posted a tweet (later deleted) suggesting First Minister of Scotland Nicola Sturgeon should have her "mouth taped shut. And her legs, so she can't reproduce". After being criticised by the Scottish National Party MP Stewart McDonald on Twitter, Kassam replied that he would not be lectured to by a "National Socialist party". He later apologised. He has tweeted in the past that Suzanne Evans, a candidate in the second 2016 UKIP leadership election, should "fuck off for good", and questioned whether Labour MP Angela Eagle attended a "special needs class".

After Evans said on The Andrew Marr Show that her "far right" and "toxic" rival would take the party away from the interests of ordinary people, Kassam questioned Evans' leadership capabilities and asserted that she had made "smears" against him. Farage repudiated Evans' comments about Kassam shortly afterwards.

At the launch of his leadership campaign, Kassam called for a national referendum on the right of women in the UK to wear the niqāb, claimed then-U.S. presidential candidate Donald Trump does not hold anti-Muslim opinions, and cast doubt on the multiple claims of sexual assault made against Trump. He also labelled his movement as Faragist and quipped that he was the "Faragest of the Faragists". Kassam gained the personal support of Arron Banks, the principal funder of UKIP.

Kassam "suspended", or withdrew, from the leadership contest on 31 October 2016, a few hours before nominations closed. Having concluded that he had only a slight chance of winning, citing insufficient funds, he criticised the media attention he received and was critical of what he claimed was media intimidation of his parents. He also questioned the fairness of a UKIP ballot. "When Times journalists show up at my elderly parents' house, intimidating them, I draw the line," he said.

=== Later developments ===
In his October 2016 Newsnight interview, Kassam suggested that Donald Trump would be a better President of the United States than Hillary Clinton. A few days after the result of the American presidential election was announced, Kassam accompanied Farage when the former UKIP-leader was the first British politician to meet President-elect Trump, at Trump Tower.

In January 2018, Kassam received media coverage for stating during a Sky News interview that London had become "a shithole" under Mayor Sadiq Khan, intentionally mirroring similar alleged comments U.S. President Trump made on immigration shortly before.

In December 2019, Kassam became editor-in-chief of The National Pulse, an American news website on the political right.

== Reform UK ==
Kassam recommended Nigel Farage to remove party chair Zia Yusuf in order to end in-fighting between Farage and one of his colleagues Rupert Lowe.

== Publications ==
On 14 August 2017, Kassam published his book No Go Zones: How Sharia Law Is Coming to a Neighborhood Near You with Nigel Farage writing the foreword to the book. Kassam and the idea of dangerous "no-go areas" for non-Muslims in European cities, a concept which numerous investigations have shown to be entirely false.

On 19 April 2018, Kassam self-published Enoch Was Right: 'Rivers of Blood' 50 Years On, in which he argues that the vision of far-right politician Enoch Powell's anti-immigration Rivers of Blood speech has been realised.
