= YBF =

YBF may refer to:

- You've Been Framed, a British television programme
- Young Britons' Foundation, a British political organisation
- Bamfield Water Aerodrome, an airport in British Columbia, Canada
