= Charles Doughty (politician) =

British Conservative politician (1902–1973)

Charles John Addison Doughty

Member of Parliament for East Surrey
- In office 1951–1970
- Preceded by: Michael Astor
- Succeeded by: William Clark

Charles John Addison Doughty, QC (21 September 1902 – 10 July 1973) was a British barrister and Conservative Party politician in the United Kingdom.

A son of Sir Charles Doughty, QC and Lady Alison (née Addison) Doughty, one of four siblings. Educated at Eton and Magdalen College, Oxford, Doughty was called to the bar in 1926 by the Inner Temple. During the Second World War, he saw service with the Coldstream Guards.

He was member of parliament for East Surrey from 1951 to 1970. It was he who in 1954 persuaded then Prime Minister Sir Winston Churchill to go through with the presentation of his famous but disliked portrait by Graham Sutherland to avoid offending the members of Parliament who financially contributed to it.

In 1955, he succeeded to his father as Recorder of Brighton, serving until 1971, becoming honorary recorder afterward.

Doughty married fellow Conservative Party member Adelaide Baillieu Shackell (1908–1986), on 29 July 1931 at St Margaret's, Westminster. They had a son and a daughter. She served from 1967 to 1968 as Chairperson of the National Union of Conservative and Unionist Associations. In 1978 she was named president. She was appointed a Dame in 1971.

Parliament of the United Kingdom
Preceded by Michael Astor	Member of Parliament for East Surrey; 1951–1970	Succeeded by William Clark
