= Conservative Party Review (2016) =

The Conservative Party Review (2016) is a set of internal reforms within the Conservative Party of the United Kingdom. It was the brainchild of Chairman of the Conservative Party, Andrew Feldman, Baron Feldman of Elstree, and has been regarded as the widest-reaching and most radical internal reforms in the Conservative Party since the 1940s.

== Background ==
Shortly after the Conservative Party's victory in the 2015 general election, Conservative Party Chairman Lord Feldman announced that he would be undertaking a review of how the Conservative Party is run, and invited members, Members of Parliament, and Party Officers to suggest changes to the Party structure and rules. This was followed by several months of consultations, and Review meetings for members in each region. The Review panel consisted of Peers, Members of Parliament, and Party Officers.

In February 2016, senior activists (Area and Regional Officers) met with the Party Chairman and the Officers of the National Conservative Convention to be shown the initial proposals, all of which were voted upon and approved. Shortly after this, parts of the proposals were leaked to news outlets such as ConservativeHome. Many of them stirred up controversy within members, and as a result the Review was re-worked and watered down. It was finally voted on by the National Conservative Convention at Conservative Party Conference in Manchester, in October 2016, and all proposals passed by over 90% of the vote.

== The Proposals ==
The Review is split into five parts. One of the most controversial changes was the implementation of Multi-Constituency Associations (MCAs), a new type of Conservative Association covering a large number of (around 10) constituencies. There are also proposed changes to the candidate selection process and membership structure.

== Future ==
After having been passed by the NCC, the proposals of the Party Review will eventually be added into the Constitution of the Conservative Party. This was considered a lengthy process, and was not expected to be completed until around 2019.

== Other Reviews ==
The Conservative Party is having two additional, ongoing, separate reviews for Governance and Conservative Future. The latter, which was, as late as May 2016, spearheaded by Chloe Smith, is expected to abolish the Party's youth organisation and integrate it into the rest of the Party.
