= Make Me a Tory =

British documentary film

- Genre: Documentary
- Created by: Daniel Cormack
- Written by: Daniel Cormack
- Directed by: Daniel Cormack
- Starring: Daniel Cormack; David Cameron; Claire Hilley; Mark Clarke; Mark Wallace
- Narrated by: Daniel Cormack
- Theme music composer: Paul Mottram
- Country of origin: United Kingdom
- Original language: English

Production
- Producer: Wendie Ottewill
- Cinematography: Sam Key; Patrick Smith; Ben Foster
- Editor: Francis Buchanan
- Running time: 24 minutes
- Production companies: Maverick Television; Resource Base

Original release
- Network: Channel 4
- Release: 13 May 2007

Make Me a Tory is a 2007 British authored documentary film directed by Daniel Cormack for Channel 4.

== Synopsis ==
The film opens with Daniel Cormack returning to the area of South London in which he grew up and reflecting on how the influence of that predominantly left-wing environment formed his political views. In spite of being born in 1979 as one of "Thatcher's children", the "thought of nailing his colours to the Tory mast" seems "nothing short of horrific". Nonetheless, since casting his first vote at the age of 18 in the Labour landslide of 1997 he has become increasingly disillusioned with the Labour government and wonders if he can "do the unthinkable and turn Tory".

Setting off on a journey around the country to meet Conservatives, he starts by revisiting his alma mater, Oxford University where he "first met people who were actually Conservatives". He is invited to a Port and Policy debate ("the Oxford equivalent of setting the world to rights over a few beers") held by the Oxford University Conservative Association, but despite a lively and at times provocative debate about David Cameron's leadership - as well as large amounts of Port - he finds himself just as unconvinced by the Oxford Conservatives as in his student days.

Traveling onwards, Daniel goes litter picking with the "gung-ho teenage Tories of the Wirral" and is impressed by their altruism, lack of cynicism and sense of civic responsibility even if the group's leader has nicknamed her car Maggie. Back in South London, Daniel is invited to a dinner party hosted by the chair of the local Conservative Future branch, Claire Hilley. Over dinner, a heated argument breaks out over the legacy of Thatcher between the ardent believers in her policies and those more in tune with David Cameron's compassionate Conservatism, leaving Daniel to ponder whether this schism in the party will manifest itself in a Conservative government.

The next day Daniel goes leafleting with the national Chair of Conservative Future - and subsequent 'Tatler Tory' election candidate for Tooting, South London - Mark Clarke. Coming from a similarly deprived background, Daniel hopes Mark's rationale for being a Conservative will help him make up his mind; a hope which is somewhat dashed when Mark makes an off-the-cuff disparaging remark about the "local people" on the council estate they are canvassing. Realising how much his background has formed his political views - and remembering the hostility shown to a Tory election candidate who came to speak at his school in 1997 - Daniel suggests Mark does a talk about Conservatism as the comprehensive he attended, Thomas Tallis School. Mark faces some robust questioning from the students, but to Daniel's surprise some of them say they would consider voting Conservative in the general election.

Confused, not only by the different varieties of conservative beliefs, but also by his own mixed feelings over going against the grain of his upbringing, Daniel decides the best way to decide once and for all is to speak to David Cameron. Explaining that Thatcher was a 'hate figure' where he grew up, Daniel asks Cameron how the Conservatives have gone from denying the concept of society to embracing it and whether this is a genuine change or a cosmetic one. Cameron replies by saying that "the 1980s was all about solving the problem of Britain's broken economy now it is actually a message much more about...the broken society. Leaving Portcullis House, Daniel concludes that while it would be a "big leap of faith" to ask the Conservatives to pick up the broken pieces of society, the Conservatives he's met have at least removed some of his negative preconceptions about the Tories.

== Reception ==
Although originally scheduled in an off-peak slot in a series of works by new directors on Channel 4, the programme went on to achieve wider awareness when, in 2008, the British Film Institute screened the film theatrically as part of a "Director's Showcase" in their February 2008 programme. Later that year, growing recognition of the film led its director and author to win a "Hot Shot" award by the trade paper Broadcast in their annual round-up of the best up and coming talent under 30.

In 2010, Make Me a Tory was selected for preservation by the British Film Institute's National Archive as well as being programmed as a permanent exhibit in the BFI's Médiathèques in London, the Library of Birmingham, the National Science and Media Museum in Bradford and Manchester Central Library as part of the Ballot Box collection of notable films on politics. Clips of the programme were used in Channel 4's Alternative Election Night 2010 coverage.

=== Critical reviews and reactions ===
Time Out London reviewed the BFI's theatrical screening:

"Director Daniel Cormack is a likeable presence as he goes front of camera in this political documentary. A disillusioned Labour supporter, Cormack goes in search of the Tory youth of today to see if his vote can be swayed. From the big teeth ya-ya brigade of Oxford Uni conservative club to interviewing the big, blue man himself - David Cameron - Cormack ends up unfortunately still floating, but it is a worthwhile and interesting piece about the future Conservatism."

== Awards ==
- Broadcast "Hot Shot" Award 2008 (Directing category)
