= Emma Pidding, Baroness Pidding =

British Conservative politician

The Right Honourable The Baroness Pidding CBE
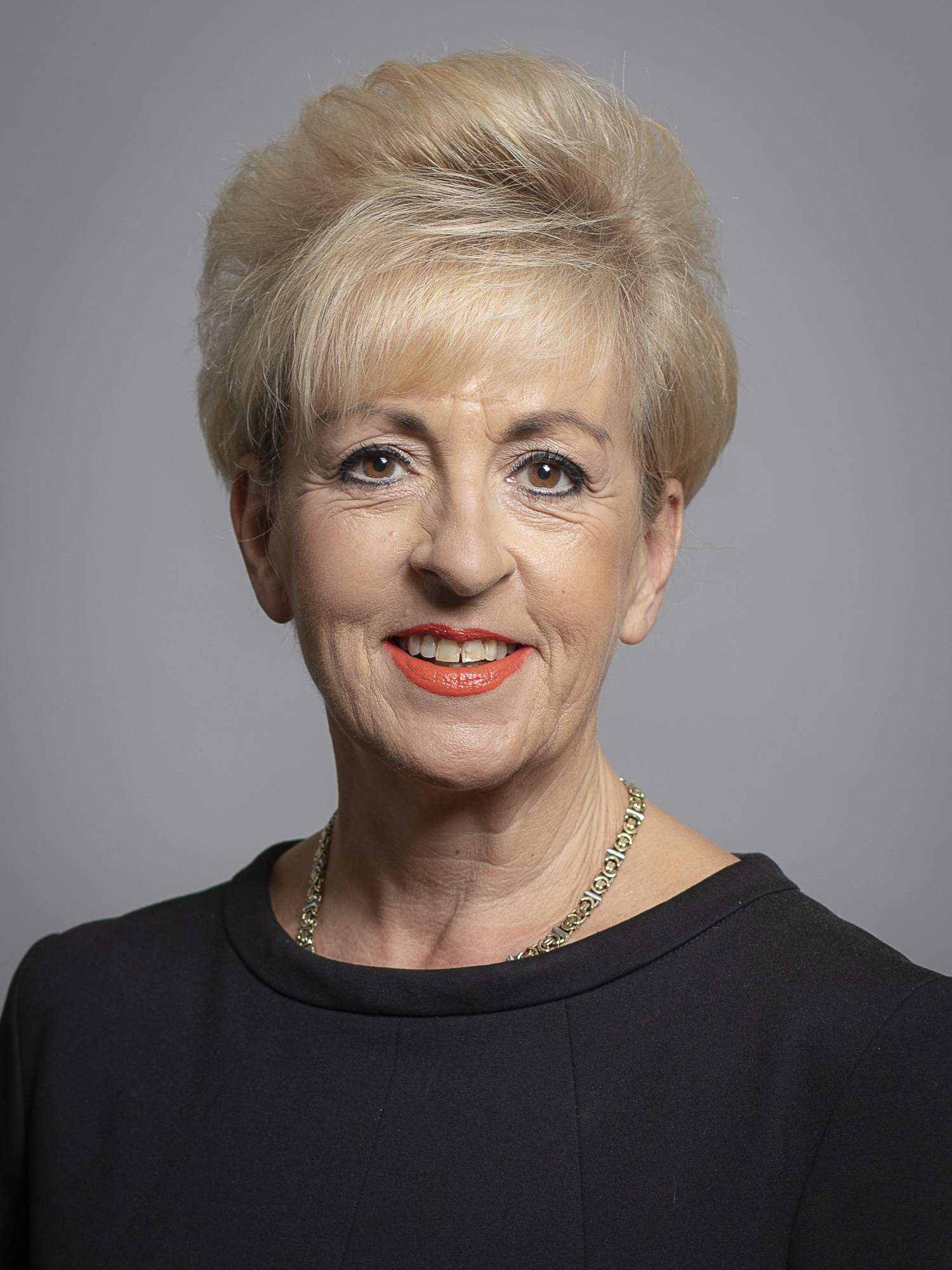

President of the Northern Ireland Conservatives
- In office 2015–2020
- Preceded by: Position established
- Succeeded by: Owen Paterson

Member of the House of Lords
- Lord Temporal
- Life peerage 8 October 2015

Personal details
- Born: January 13, 1966 (age 60) Solihull, England
- Party: Northern Ireland Conservative

Emma Samantha Pidding, Baroness Pidding, CBE (born 13 January 1966) is a British Conservative parliamentarian and member of the House of Lords.

Pidding was educated at Brudenell Secondary School for Girls (now Amersham School), and at Dr Challoner's High School, later becoming a bank clerk in Amersham, Buckinghamshire.

A former Chiltern District Councillor and Chairman of the National Conservative Convention, she was created a Life Peer on 8 October 2015, taking the title Baroness Pidding, of Amersham in the County of Buckinghamshire.

Pidding was appointed a Commander of the Order of the British Empire (CBE) for voluntary political service in the 2014 New Year Honours.

== Bullying controversy ==
In November 2015, the Conservative Party closed down "Road Trip", an organisation to transport Conservative activists about the country by bus - Pidding was implicated in this process. The Conservative Future Youth Wing was closed as a result. Conservative Party member, activist and unsuccessful 2010 General Election candidate Mark Clarke's membership was cancelled "for life" on 18 November 2015 amid allegations of sexual assaults, drugs, bullying and the attempted blackmail of a Cabinet Minister, Robert Halfon.

== Arms ==
Coat of arms of Emma Pidding, Baroness Pidding

Notes
Granted by Thomas Woodcock, Garter King of Arms
Coronet
of a Baroness
Orders
Order of the British Empire (Commander)
