= Adelaide Doughty =

Australian-British politician (1908–1986)

Dame Adelaide Baillieu Doughty DBE
- Born: Adelaide Baillieu Shackell; 2 December 1908; Malvern, Victoria, Australia
- Died: 12 August 1986 (aged 77); Kensington, London, England
- Education: St Catherine's School, Toorak; St Hilda's College, Oxford
- Title: Chairman of the National Union of Conservative and Unionist Associations
- Term: 1967–1968
- Predecessor: Sir Robert Davies
- Successor: Sir Theodore Constantine
- Political party: Conservative Party
- Spouse: Charles Doughty (1931–1973)
- Awards: Order of the British Empire

Dame Adelaide Baillieu Doughty DBE (née Shackell; 2 December 1908 – 12 August 1986) was an Australian-British political figure.

== Biography ==
Adelaide Baillieu Shackell was born in Malvern, Victoria, Australia, the second of four children of Edward Herbert Shackell (1869–1932), a businessman and accountant, and his wife, Amy Baillieu (1870–1966). She was initially educated at home, and then at St. Catherine's School, Melbourne from the age of twelve. She was accepted by Melbourne University, but on the suggestion of her cousin Clive Latham Baillieu, travelled to England where she entered St Hilda's College, Oxford, in 1928, graduating with a degree in Modern Greats. While at university she met lawyer Charles Addison Doughty. They were soon engaged and were married on 29 July 1931 at St Margaret's, Westminster. They had a son and a daughter.

In 1947 Adelaide Doughty joined the English-Speaking Union, being elected as an ESU Club Director in 1950, then Chairman of the Board of Club Directors in 1969, and finally served as a Governor from 1958 to 1972, when she resigned. In 1951 her husband was elected Member of Parliament for East Surrey, and Doughty began to work for the Conservative Party. She served on the South-Eastern Area Women's Advisory Committee from 1951 to 1956, and was Chairman of the Women's National Advisory Committee from 1963 to 1966. She also served as Vice-Chairman of the National Union of Conservative and Unionist Associations from 1964, where she supported Edward Heath's election as party leader, and became Chairman in 1967. She also served as President in 1978. She was made a Commander of the Order of the British Empire "for political services in the South East" in the 1964 Birthday Honours, and a Dame Commander in the 1971 New Year Honours.

Doughty also served as a governor of the Skinners' Company's School for Girls in 1951, as director of the National Institute for Housecraft from 1966, and was a member of the Grand Council of the Cancer Research Campaign from 1974.

She died at her home in Onslow Square, Kensington, London, on 12 August 1986.
