= Durham University Conservative and Unionist Association =

University political society

- Logo of the association
- Abbreviation: DUCUA
- Formation: First meeting in 1934, established in 1935
- Type: University political society
- President: Sean Smith, South College
- Treasurer: Stanley McPeake, Hatfield College
- Secretary: James Downing, Grey College
- Website: https://www.durhamsu.com/groups/studentgroup/8145/
- Formerly called: Durham University Conservative Association

The Durham University Conservative and Unionist Association, formerly the Durham University Conservative Association, is a conservative student society at the University of Durham. It held its first meeting in 1934, but formed as a society in 1935 and is affiliated with the Durham Students' Union.

The Association's alumni include senior figures within the Conservative Party, notably Lord Graham Brady and Sir Edward Leigh. In recent years it has redefined its stance and ethos to that of a society which promotes free speech and civil debate, over party allegiance.

== History ==
The Durham University Conservative and Unionist Association held its first annual dinner on 24 January 1934. It was hosted at the School of Art in Armstrong College. It has also been described as the first meeting, and the first president of the association was in attendance, Lord Castlereagh.

Ironically, the Durham branch of the Association, from which the current association is descended, was not the first branch of the association. When it was founded in late 1935, the Newcastle section, then called the Armstrong College (Newcastle) branch, had already been in existence for some years.

By the 1950s, the name was firmly established as the Durham University Conservative Association.

Come the mid-1980s the association was noted as taking a strong libertarian stance on issues. Membership reached 250, a significant number considering the 4,700 student population.

In 2016, protests over Godfrey Bloom being invited to speak saw his event held in a pub. When asked by The Times about protesters outside the pub, the Association president commented "Yahboo and sucks to the lefties who were protesting outside - I hope you got cold."

In 2020 the Association was removed from the Student Union Student Group Register over claims of 'fascist, racist, antisemitic and misogynistic' comments, made allegedly by members. The Association responded by insisting that none of its members were involved in the alleged incident, but nevertheless condemned the incident. Some committee members resigned in protest over the accusations. In order to be returned to the Register, the Association had to change its name, selecting Durham Unionist Conservative Society.

In Easter term 2023, the President decreed the redesignation of the Society to the Durham University Conservative and Unionist Association. The Association's constitution was changed to reflect this transition.

In Michaelmas term of 2023, members of the committee voiced opposition and concern to an invitation to sign the Pinsker Center's open letter written in collaboration with other University Conservative Associations expressing unequivocal and unending support for Israel regardless of their actions. As a result of their concerns a committee vote was called on signing the letter, in which the committee overwhelmingly voted to decline Pinskers offer. Subsequently, DUCUA received backlash from other university associations and the Pinsker Center for their refusal to fall in line. The then committee maintain that this was the right decision.

== Port and Policy ==
Port and Policy is the Association's main social event, where topical motions of the day are debated fortnightly. On these evenings, the Association typically provides port to its members. The Political Officer is the ex officio adjudicator and master of ceremonies of these debates; it is they who usually procures the motions.

In Epiphany 2024, following multiple incidents of disorderly behaviour, the then-Political Officer directed that a set of standing orders be published. They were ratified by the committee in February 2024, and are still used to this day to guide debates. This publication signified a shift in the Association's ethos from one of party loyalty to one of free speech and civil debate.

== In popular culture ==
In 2016 it was highlighted that the Association was larger than the Durham Labour Society, suggesting a general right-wing lean to Durham students, as opposed to the conventional left-wing lean of most UK university students.

The swiftness of the Associations removal by the Student's Union in 2020 has been remarked by some commentators as indicative of the revisionist nature of the Students' Union, and of cancel culture more widely. One school of thought would have it that such was a move by the Student Union to unseat conservatism from the university; opposing the Oxbridge-character that the university has maintained since its inception. Conversely, it is claimed that this character, through displays of class contempt such as about the North-South divide, is openly exhibited.

== Notable alumni ==
- Piers Merchant, Chairman, former MP
- Lord Graham Brady, Chairman, former MP and current peer
- Sir Nick Gibb, Chairman, former MP
- Sir Edward Leigh, Chairman, current MP
- Dame Jackie Doyle-Price, former MP
- Lord James Wharton, President, former MP and current peer
- Ben Howlett, President, former MP
- Huw Merriman, President, former MP
- Sir Robert Buckland, former MP
