= Connor Rand =

British politician

Connor Rand MP
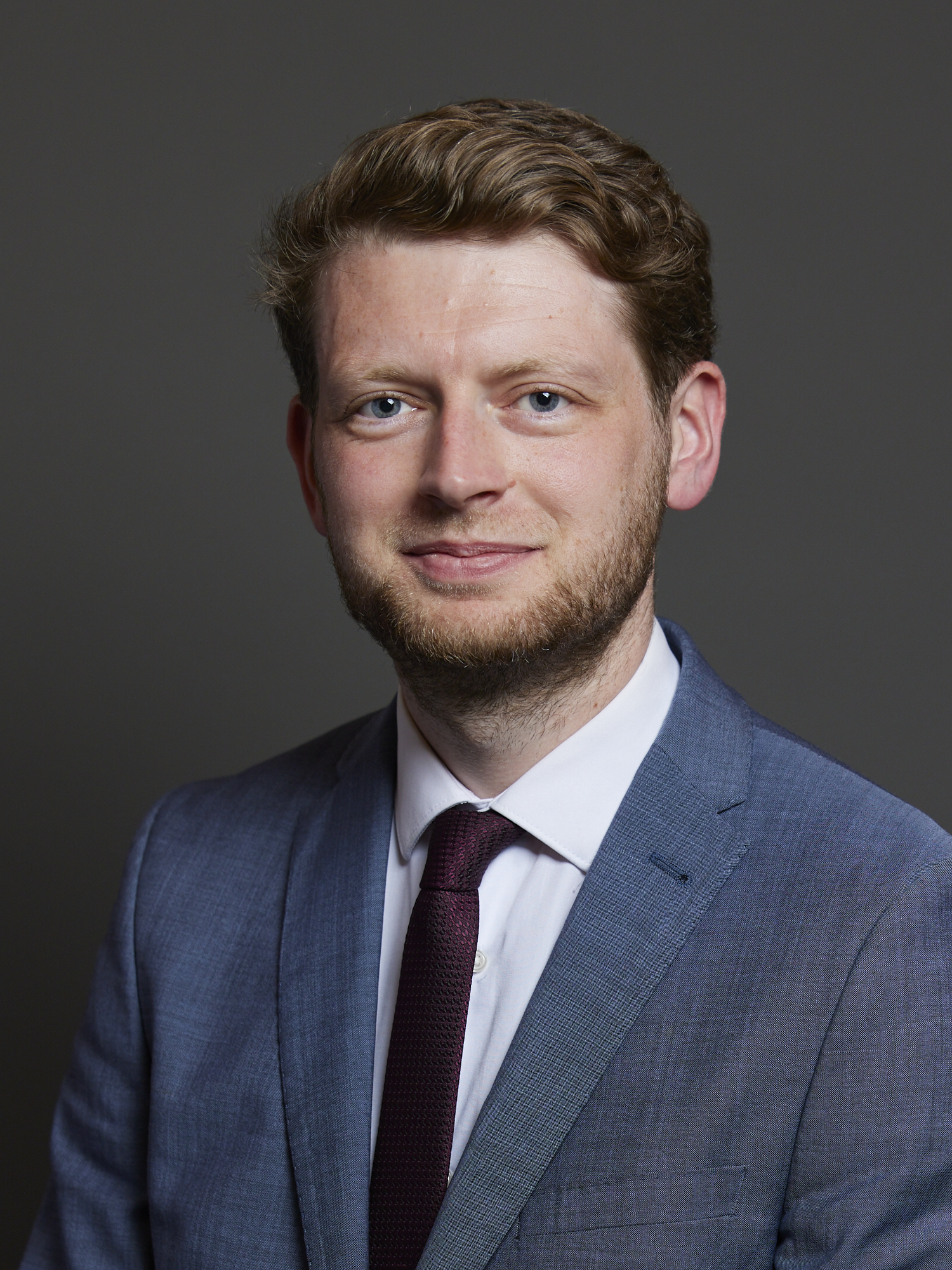
- Official portrait, 2024

Member of Parliament for Altrincham and Sale West
- Incumbent
- Assumed office 4 July 2024
- Preceded by: Graham Brady
- Constituency: Altrincham and Sale West
- Majority: 4,174 (8.1%)

Personal details
- Born: Connor Dean Rand; 1992 or 1993 (age 33–34)
- Party: Labour
- Children: 2
- Education: University of East Anglia (BA)

Connor Dean Rand (born 1992 or 1993) is a Labour politician serving as Member of Parliament (MP) for Altrincham and Sale West since 2024.

== Career ==
Rand attended the private, fee-paying Wisbech Grammar School in Cambridgeshire. He received a Bachelor of Arts in History from the University of East Anglia in 2014, where he subsequently worked as the student union's undergraduate education officer.

Rand worked as an organiser for Labour Students, and later as a regional organiser for the Labour Party. He was a senior researcher at the Union of Shop, Distributive and Allied Workers (USDAW) prior to his election to Parliament.

Shortly before the 2024 general election, Labour's National Executive Committee selected Rand to contest Altrincham and Sale West. The previous candidate had resigned due to personal circumstances. He became the first Labour MP to represent the constituency upon his election, gaining the seat from the Conservatives. Rand has served as a member of the Home Affairs Select Committee since October 2024.

== Personal life ==
Rand has two sons and his partner, Catherine, is a primary school teacher.

Parliament of the United Kingdom
Preceded by Graham Brady	Member of Parliament for Altrincham and Sale West; 2024–present	Incumbent
