= Charles Doughty (lawyer) =

Sir Charles Doughty, QC (27 July 1878 – 2 May 1956) was a British barrister and noted industrial arbitrator.

The son of Charles Doughty, JP, of Lincoln, Charles Doughty was educated at Oatlands in Harrogate, Rugby School, and Corpus Christi College, Oxford, where he graduated BA and BCL. He was called to the bar by the Inner Temple in 1902. Appointed a conciliator in industrial disputes for the Board of Trade and the Minister of Labour in 1915, he was throughout his career member of numerous industrial conciliation bodies. He was knighted in 1941.

Having become a KC in 1925, Doughty was Recorder of Canterbury from 1929 to 1937, Recorder of Guildford from 1937 to 1939, and Recorder of Brighton from 1939 to 1955, being succeeded in the last office by his son, C J A Doughty, QC, sometime MP for East Surrey. He was also sometime Chairman of the General Council of the Bar.
