= Ben Howlett (politician) =

British Conservative politician

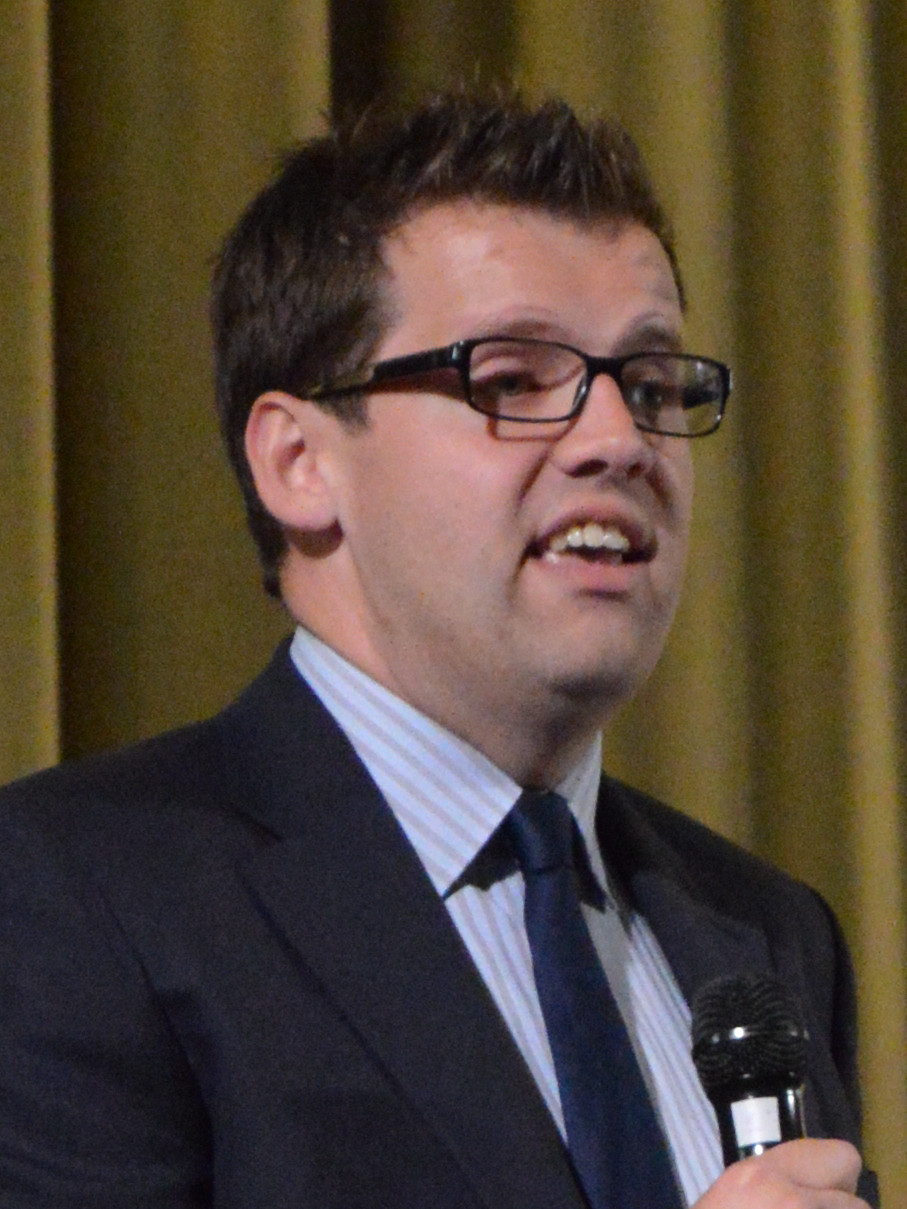
- Howlett in 2015

Member of Parliament for Bath
- In office 8 May 2015 – 3 May 2017
- Preceded by: Don Foster
- Succeeded by: Wera Hobhouse

Personal details
- Born: 21 August 1986 (age 40)
- Party: Conservative
- Education: University of Durham; University of Cambridge
- Website: Official website

Benjamin John Howlett (born 21 August 1986) is an English Conservative Party politician. He was the Member of Parliament (MP) for Bath between the 2015 and 2017 general elections.

== Early life and career ==
Ben Howlett was born on 21 August 1986. He was educated at Manningtree High School in Essex, then studied History and Politics at the University of Durham, and a Masters in Economic History at the University of Cambridge. He served as President of the Durham University Conservative Association in 2007. He lived in Little Oakley, which is on the outskirts of Harwich.

Howlett worked as a recruitment consultant from 2008 to 2015, latterly specialising in non-medical positions in the healthcare sector.

== Political career ==
Howlett joined the Conservative Party in 2004, working for MP Douglas Carswell, and from 2007 to 2010 for London MEP Syed Kamall. He has been leader of the Conservative group on Harwich Town Council. He was chair of Conservative Future from 2010 to 2013. In November 2015, following the suicide of a young Conservative activist, Elliott Johnson, Howlett told the BBC's Newsnight programme that "institutionalised bullying" in the youth team had been "swept under the carpet" because the party did not want to lose the 2015 general election.

Howlett moved to Bath after spending two weeks in the city campaigning to be selected as the Conservative candidate in November 2013. In January 2015, he said his party "wouldn't have a hope in hell here if it weren't for Don Foster standing down". He subsequently gained the seat at the 2015 general election, succeeding the retiring Liberal Democrat MP.

Howlett sat on the Women and Equalities Select Committee and the Petitions Select Committee from July 2015 to May 2017.

Howlett was opposed to Brexit. In the wake of the referendum result, he argued that Britain should stay in the European single market. In October 2016, he asked the Minister of State for Universities and Science Jo Johnson to leave international students out of immigration figures in order to ensure British universities remain attractive on the global stage.

Howlett later said, in support of allegations made in the 2022 Partygate political scandal, that Conservative whips had threatened that funding to investigate a new link road for Bath would be withheld if he did not support key Brexit votes.

He lost Bath to the Liberal Democrat Wera Hobhouse in the 2017 general election.

== Later career ==
In July 2017 Howlett became joint director, later managing director, of consultancy Public Policy Projects, working in the areas of health, care and other public policy, and also works on the Hospital Times publication.

== Personal life ==
Howlett is gay and is a proponent of same sex marriage. He is a Christian. In October 2026, Howlett pleaded guilty to assault by beating in connection with an incident in Battersea, London, on 25 June 2021. He is due to be sentenced at Kingston Crown Court on 10 December 2026.

Parliament of the United Kingdom
Preceded by Don Foster	Member of Parliament for Bath; 2015–2017	Succeeded by Wera Hobhouse
