= Altrincham and Sale West =

Parliamentary constituency in the United Kingdom, 1997 onwards

Coordinates: 53°23′N 2°21′W

- Borough constituency for the House of Commons
- Interactive map of boundaries since 2010
- Location within North West England
- County: Greater Manchester
- Population: 96,591 (2011 census)
- Electorate: 73,934 (March 2020)
- Borough: Trafford
- Major settlements: Altrincham, Hale, Sale, Timperley

Current constituency
- Created: 1997
- Member of Parliament: Connor Rand (Labour)
- Created from: Altrincham and Sale, Davyhulme

Altrincham and Sale West (/ˈɒltrɪŋəm/ OL-tring-əm) is a constituency (Note: A borough constituency (for the purposes of election expenses and type of returning officer)) represented in the House of Commons of the UK Parliament since the 2024 general election by Connor Rand of the Labour Party. (Note: As with all constituencies, the constituency elects one Member of Parliament (MP) by the first past the post system of election at least every five years.)

== Constituency profile ==
Typical large detached housing in Bowdon

The constituency is located in south-western Greater Manchester in the metropolitan borough of Trafford. It includes the suburban town of Altrincham, the western part of Sale and rural areas to the west stretching to the River Mersey, including Dunham Massey.

A highly affluent area, the constituency includes some of the most expensive residential streets in North West England, typified by areas like Bowdon and Hale Barns, home to some footballers of Manchester's two Premier League teams. Compared to the country as a whole, the constituency has a low unemployment rate, low levels of deprivation and a high percentage of degree-educated residents. The constituency's ethnic composition is similar to the national average.

== History ==
The 1995 Boundary Commission review led to the constituency's creation for the 1997 election, largely from the old seat of Altrincham and Sale; from that time until the dissolution of parliament in advance of the 2024 general election it was held by Graham Brady, long elected by his colleagues the chairman of the Conservative Party's backbench 1922 Committee (2010 to present; he stood down in May 2019, returning that September). In March 2023 Brady announced he would not seek re-election.

From 2001 to 2010, it was the only Conservative seat in Greater Manchester; its predecessor seats were always Conservative. In 1997, local grammar school–educated Brady was elected on a small majority of 1,500. His majority peaked at over 13,000 in 2015, being reduced in 2017 to just under 7,000. In 2019, it fell further to 6,139, a swing of 0.5% from Conservative to Labour, bucking the trend of large swings in the opposite direction. At the 2024 election, Connor Rand was elected on a swing of 9.7% as the first ever Labour MP for this seat or its predecessors (Altrincham and Sale, and Altrincham).

Trafford was one of three areas in Greater Manchester to vote Remain in the EU referendum. However, Brady campaigned for Leave.

== Boundaries ==
=== Historic ===
1997–2010: The Borough of Trafford wards of Altrincham, Bowdon, Broadheath, Hale, Mersey St Mary's, St Martin's, Timperley, and Village.

2010–2023: The Borough of Trafford wards of Altrincham, Ashton upon Mersey, Bowdon, Broadheath, Hale Barns, Hale Central, St Mary's, Timperley, and Village.

=== Current ===
Further to a local government boundary review which came into effect in May 2023, the constituency now comprises the following wards of the Metropolitan Borough of Trafford:

- Altrincham; Ashton upon Mersey; Bowdon; Broadheath; Hale Barns & Timperley South; Hale; Manor; Timperley Central; Timplerley North.

The 2023 review of Westminster constituencies, which was based on the ward structure in place at 1 December 2020, left the boundaries unchanged.

The constituency is one of three covering the Metropolitan Borough of Trafford. It covers the south of the borough, covering the town of Altrincham and the west of Sale. It is bordered by the constituencies of Stretford and Urmston, Tatton, Warrington North, Warrington South, and Wythenshawe and Sale East.

== Members of Parliament ==
Election	Member	Party
1997	Sir Graham Brady	Conservative
2024	Connor Rand	Labour

== Elections ==
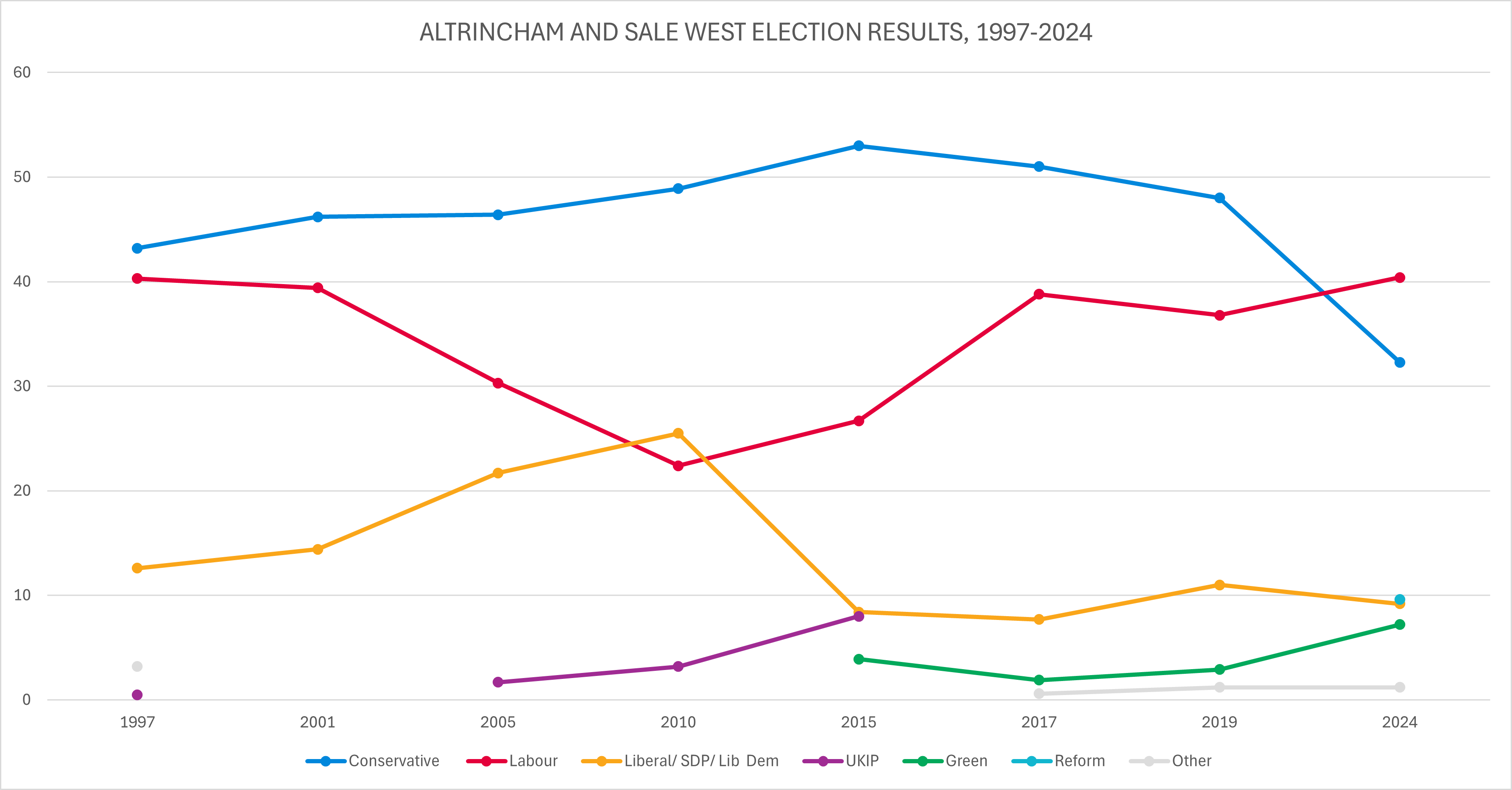
Election results (1997–2024)

=== Elections in the 2020s ===
General election 2024: Altrincham and Sale West
Party	Candidate	Votes	%	±%
Labour	Connor Rand	20,798	40.4	▲3.6
Conservative	Oliver Carroll	16,624	32.3	▼15.7
Reform	Paul Swansborough	4,961	9.6	new
Liberal Democrats	Jane Brophy	4,727	9.2	▼1.8
Green	Geraldine Coggins	3,699	7.2	▲4.3
Workers Party	Faisal Kabir	643	1.2	new
Majority		4,174	8.1	
Turnout		51,452	69.5	▼4.6
Registered electors		74,026		
Labour gain from Conservative		Swing	▲9.7	

=== Elections in the 2010s ===
2019 notional result
Party	Vote	%
Conservative	26,311	48.0
Labour	20,172	36.8
Liberal Democrats	6,036	11.0
Green Party	1,566	2.9
Liberal Party	454	0.8
Independent	224	0.4
Majority	6,139	11.2
Turnout	54,763	74.1
Electorate	75,655	

General election 2019: Altrincham and Sale West
Party	Candidate	Votes	%	±%
Conservative	Graham Brady	26,311	48.0	−3.0
Labour	Andrew Western	20,172	36.8	−2.0
Liberal Democrats	Angela Smith	6,036	11.0	+3.3
Green	Geraldine Coggins	1,566	2.9	+1.0
Liberal	Neil Taylor	454	0.8	+0.2
Independent	Iram Kiani	224	0.4	N/A
Majority		6,139	11.2	−1.0
Turnout		54,763	74.9	+2.8
Registered electors		73,107		
Conservative hold		Swing	−0.5	

General election 2017: Altrincham and Sale West
Party	Candidate	Votes	%	±%
Conservative	Graham Brady	26,933	51.0	−2.0
Labour	Andrew Western	20,507	38.8	+12.1
Liberal Democrats	Jane Brophy	4,051	7.7	−0.7
Green	Geraldine Coggins	1,000	1.9	−2.0
Liberal	Neil Taylor	299	0.6	N/A
Majority		6,426	12.2	−14.1
Turnout		52,790	72.1	+2.9
Registered electors		73,226		
Conservative hold		Swing	−7.1	

General election 2015: Altrincham and Sale West
Party	Candidate	Votes	%	±%
Conservative	Graham Brady	26,771	53.0	+4.1
Labour	James Wright	13,481	26.7	+4.3
Liberal Democrats	Jane Brophy	4,235	8.4	−17.1
UKIP	Chris Frost	4,047	8.0	+4.8
Green	Nick Robertson-Brown	1,983	3.9	N/A
Majority		13,290	26.3	+2.9
Turnout		50,517	70.2	+0.9
Registered electors		71,511		
Conservative hold		Swing	−0.2	

General election 2010: Altrincham and Sale West
Party	Candidate	Votes	%	±%
Conservative	Graham Brady	24,176	48.9	+1.9
Liberal Democrats	Jane Brophy	12,581	25.5	+3.6
Labour	Tom Ross	11,073	22.4	−7.0
UKIP	Kenneth Bullman	1,563	3.2	+1.5
Majority		11,595	23.4	+7.2
Turnout		49,393	69.3	+1.5
Registered electors		72,208		
Conservative hold		Swing	−0.9	

=== Elections in the 2000s ===
General election 2005: Altrincham and Sale West
Party	Candidate	Votes	%	±%
Conservative	Graham Brady	20,569	46.4	+0.2
Labour	John Stockton	13,410	30.3	−9.1
Liberal Democrats	Ian Chappell	9,595	21.7	+7.3
UKIP	Gary Peart	736	1.7	N/A
Majority		7,159	16.1	+9.3
Turnout		44,310	65.9	+5.6
Registered electors		66,337		
Conservative hold		Swing	+4.7	

General election 2001: Altrincham and Sale West
Party	Candidate	Votes	%	±%
Conservative	Graham Brady	20,113	46.2	+3.0
Labour	Jane Baugh	17,172	39.4	−0.9
Liberal Democrats	Christopher Gaskell	6,283	14.4	+1.8
Majority		2,941	6.8	+3.9
Turnout		43,568	60.3	−13.0
Registered electors		72,288		
Conservative hold		Swing	+1.9	

=== Elections in the 1990s ===
General election 1997: Altrincham and Sale West
Party	Candidate	Votes	%	±%
Conservative	Graham Brady	22,348	43.2	
Labour	Jane Baugh	20,843	40.3	
Liberal Democrats	Marc Ramsbottom	6,535	12.6	
Referendum	Anthony Landes	1,348	2.6	
ProLife Alliance	Jonathan Stephens	313	0.6	
UKIP	Richard Mrozinski	270	0.5	
Majority		1,505	2.9	
Turnout		51,657	73.3	
Registered electors		70,625		
Conservative win (new seat)				

== See also ==
- Parliamentary constituencies in Greater Manchester
