= Graham Brady =

British politician (born 1967)

The Right Honourable The Lord Brady of Altrincham PC
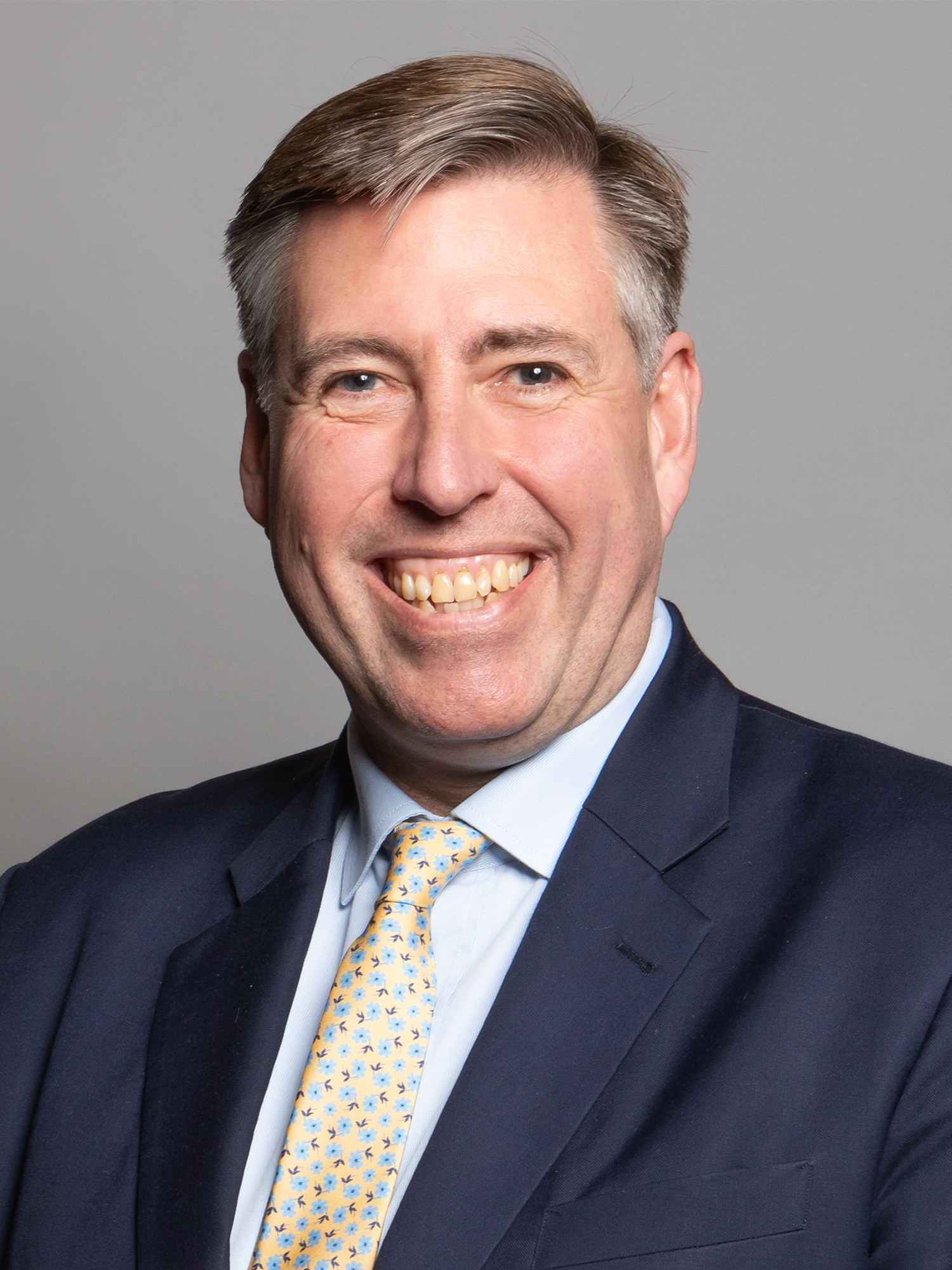
- Official portrait, 2020

Chairman of the 1922 Committee
- In office 26 May 2010 – 9 July 2024
- Leader: David Cameron; Theresa May; Boris Johnson; Liz Truss; Rishi Sunak
- Preceded by: Sir Michael Spicer
- Succeeded by: Bob Blackman
Shadow portfolios
Shadow Minister for Europe
In office 15 June 2004 – 3 July 2007
| Leader | Michael Howard; David Cameron |
| Succeeded by | Mark Francois |
Shadow Minister for Education
In office 18 September 2001 – 1 July 2003
| Leader | Iain Duncan Smith |
Shadow Spokesperson for Work and Pensions
In office 1 June 2000 – 1 June 2001
| Leader | William Hague |

Member of the House of Lords
- Lord Temporal
- Life peerage 19 August 2024

Member of Parliament for Altrincham and Sale West
- In office 1 May 1997 – 30 May 2024
- Preceded by: Constituency established
- Succeeded by: Connor Rand

Personal details
- Born: Graham Stuart Brady; 20 May 1967 (age 59) Salford, Lancashire, England
- Party: Conservative
- Spouse: Victoria Lowther (m. 1992)
- Children: 2
- Education: St Aidan's College, Durham (BA)
- Website: www.grahambrady.co.uk

Graham Stuart Brady, Baron Brady of Altrincham (born 20 May 1967) is a British politician who served as the Member of Parliament (MP) for Altrincham and Sale West from 1997 to 2024. A member of the Conservative Party, he was the chairman of the 1922 Committee from 2010 to 2024, except for a brief period during the 2019 Conservative Party leadership election.

Brady served as a shadow minister under four Conservative leaders before resigning in 2007 in protest at David Cameron's opposition to grammar schools. On 1 December 2010, Brady was voted "Backbencher of the Year" by The Spectator at its annual parliamentary awards.

During his tenure as 1922 Committee chairman, Brady has overseen the election of three Conservative Party leaders and Prime Ministers (Theresa May, Liz Truss and Rishi Sunak) (Note: Brady recused himself from overseeing the 2019 Conservative Party leadership election, which was won by Boris Johnson, because Brady himself considered running for the leadership before declining.) as well as votes of no confidence in May and Boris Johnson.

Brady stepped down as an MP at the 2024 general election and was appointed to the House of Lords.

== Early life and education ==
Graham Brady was born on 20 May 1967 in Salford, Lancashire, the son of an accountant and his wife a medical secretary. The family then moved to nearby Timperley and his parents divorced when he was 18. He was educated at Altrincham Grammar School for Boys, where he was deputy head boy, before studying law at the University of Durham, at St Aidan's College, graduating with a Bachelor of Arts (BA) degree in 1989.

Brady was highly active in politics as a student. He served as Chairman of the Durham University Conservative Association (DUCA) for the 1987–1988 academic year and was one of six students elected to represent Durham at the annual NUS conference. He served additionally as Chairman of Northern Area Conservative Students (1987–1989) and as a member of the Conservative Party's National Union Executive Committee (1988–1989).

== Early career ==
Brady was appointed a consultant in public relations with Shandwick plc in 1989. He joined the Centre for Policy Studies in 1990. He was appointed director of public affairs at the Waterfront Partnership in 1992, where he remained until he was elected to the House of Commons in 1997. He was vice-chairman of the East Berkshire Conservative Association from 1993 to 1995.

== Parliamentary career ==
Brady was selected to contest the Altrincham and Sale West, following the retirement of the Conservative MP Fergus Montgomery. Brady was elected as MP for Altrincham and Sale West at the 1997 general election with 43.2% of the vote and a majority of 1,505. He was the youngest Conservative MP to be elected in 1997, having been elected just before his 30th birthday. In the party leadership election that followed, Brady supported Michael Howard.

Brady made his maiden speech in the House of Commons on 2 June 1997. From 1997 to 2001 he was a member of the Education and Employment Select Committee and its Employment Sub-Committee. He was joint secretary of the Conservative Party Committee for Education and Employment from 1997 to 2000.

In 1998 Brady made enquiries to John Bourn, at the time Comptroller and Auditor General, on his decision not to publish a National Audit Office report on the controversial Al-Yamamah arms deal. The same year, Brady was one of only 13 Conservative MPs who voted in favour of an equal age of consent. He was a member of the executive of the 1922 Committee from 1998 to 2000.

Brady became parliamentary private secretary (PPS) to the Chairman of the Conservative Party, Michael Ancram in 1999. He was made an Opposition Whip by William Hague in 2000. In February 2000, Brady complained about anti-grammar school literature circulated to parents in Altrincham by Michael Evans, then head of Trinity Church of England High School, arguing that this violated rules about public funds being used for campaign material – a complaint subsequently upheld by Secretary of State for Education David Blunkett. That same year Brady became an opposition spokesman on Education and Employment.

Brady was re-elected as MP for Altrincham and Sale West at the 2001 general election with an increased vote share of 46.2% and an increased majority of 2,941.

Following the election, Brady continued as an opposition spokesman on Education and Skills under the leadership of both Hague and Iain Duncan Smith. He became the parliamentary private secretary to the Leader of the Opposition, Michael Howard, in 2003, and an opposition spokesman on foreign affairs and Shadow Europe Minister in 2004. From 2004 to 2005 he was a member of the Office of the Deputy Prime Minister Select Committee and its Urban Affairs Sub-Committee. He was vice-chair of the all-party Montserrat Group from 2006. He became a member of the Treasury Select Committee and rejoined the executive of the 1922 Committee in 2007.

At the 2005 general election, Brady was again re-elected with an increased vote share of 46.4% and an increased majority of 7,159.

On 29 May 2007, Brady resigned his post as Shadow Minister for Europe in protest at Conservative leader David Cameron's opposition to grammar schools. He told the BBC that "faced with a choice between a front bench position that I have loved and doing what I believe to be right for my constituents and for the many hundreds of thousands of families who are ill-served by state education in this country, there is in conscience only one option open to me", and argued that "grammar schools in selective areas are exactly the motor that does drive social mobility more effectively than comprehensive areas". Brady's own constituency has retained a selective rather than comprehensive education system.

Brady was secretary of the all-party Fluoridation Group and Infrastructure Group from 2008. From 2009 he was treasurer of the all-party Thailand Group and vice-chairman of the Cannabis and Children Group.

At the 2010 general election, Brady was again re-elected with an increased vote share of 48.9% and an increased majority of 11,595.

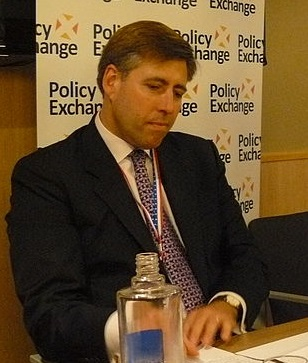
Brady at the Conservative Party conference in 2011

In 2013, he opposed the Marriage (Same Sex Couples) Act 2013, raising concerns that the measure had not been in the Conservative manifesto and that religious freedom could be compromised.

At the 2015 general election, Brady was again re-elected with an increased vote share of 53% and an increased majority of 13,290.

In the 2016 EU referendum, he was a supporter of Brexit.

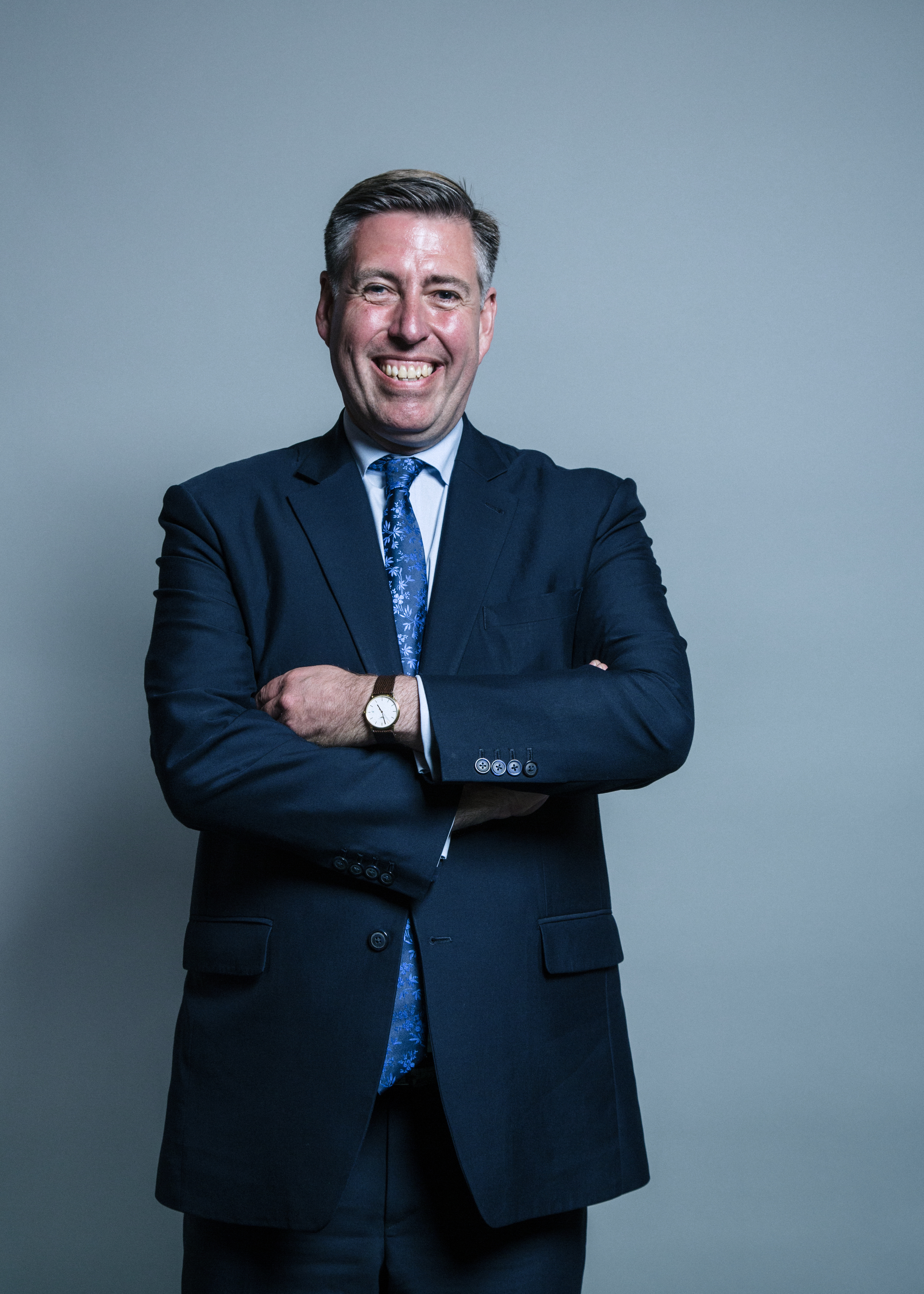
Official portrait, 2017

At the snap 2017 general election, Brady was again re-elected, with a decreased vote share of 51% and a decreased majority of 6,426.

In July 2018, it was reported that Brady served as editor of The House, the in-house Parliamentary magazine, earning a salary of £26,000 for the role.

Brady was again re-elected at the 2019 general election with a decreased vote share of 48% and a decreased majority of 6,139.

In 2024, he was elected as the president of the Northern Ireland Conservatives party.

=== 1922 Committee ===
Brady succeeded Sir Michael Spicer as Chairman of the 1922 Committee on 26 May 2010.

The committee, sometimes known as "The 22" for short, is the parliamentary group of the Conservative Party and has a central role in the election of the Leader of the Conservative Party. Since 2010 Brady oversaw the election of 4 Conservative Leaders (Theresa May in 2016, Boris Johnson in 2019, Liz Truss in 2022 and Rishi Sunak in 2022) all of whom became the Prime Minister since the Conservative Party had been in office throughout his tenure as chairman.

On 24 May 2019, he recused himself from overseeing the 2019 Conservative Party leadership election in order to explore launching his own candidacy, but ultimately opted not to run for Leader. His Deputy Chairmen Cheryl Gillan and Charles Walker oversaw the 2019 leadership contest which resulted in the election of Boris Johnson.

Brady returned to his role as Chairman the 1922 Committee on 3 September 2019. He was subsequently re-elected in the next session of Parliament on 20 January 2020.

Brady's role as Chairman of the 1922 gave him a high public profile, as it fell to him to announce the results of each leadership election or challenge, which was followed on live TV and streaming around the world.

In 2022, Brady became the longest-ever serving Chairman of the 1922 Committee, surpassing Edward du Cann.

=== Legislation ===
==== Brexit: anti-Northern Ireland backstop amendment ====
On 29 January 2019, the House of Commons voted 317 to 301 to approve Brady's amendment to the Brexit Next Steps motion, which called for "the Northern Ireland backstop to be replaced with alternative arrangements to avoid a hard border, supports leaving the European Union with a deal and would therefore support the Withdrawal Agreement subject to this change".

==== COVID-19 lockdowns ====
In May 2020, Brady called for the removal of "arbitrary rules and limitations on freedom" brought in by the government because of the COVID-19 pandemic. He said that the British public had been "a little too willing to stay at home". Speaking out against a second lockdown, he also spoke about COVID-related mental health issues, such as increased rates of suicide and domestic abuse, as well as excess deaths caused due to reduced access for care. Brady is also a steering committee member of the lockdown-sceptic COVID Recovery Group, a group of Conservative MPs who oppose the UK government's December 2020 lockdown. The Telegraph reported that the group was seen in Westminster as an "echo" of the Brexiteer European Research Group (ERG) of MPs, and a response by backbench Conservatives to Nigel Farage's anti-lockdown Reform UK party.

=== Peerage ===
After standing down as an MP at the 2024 general election, Brady was nominated for a life peerage in the 2024 Dissolution Honours. He was created Baron Brady of Altrincham, of Birch-in-Rusholme in the County of Greater Manchester, on 19 August 2024.

In 2024 he published a memoir of his time leading the 1922 Committee, entitled Kingmaker.

== Personal life ==
Brady met Victoria Lowther at Durham University. The couple married in 1992, and have a daughter and a son. They divide their time between homes in London and Altrincham; his wife worked as his senior parliamentary assistant.

== Honours ==
Brady was made a Freeman of Altrincham in September 2016 for services to the community of Altrincham and its environs.

Brady was knighted for political and public service in the 2018 New Year Honours. His investiture by Prince William, Duke of Cambridge, took place at Buckingham Palace on 6 March 2018.

Brady was sworn as a member of the Privy Council (PC) in November 2023. The same month, he was admitted as a freeman of the City of London.

== Notes ==
Parliament of the United Kingdom
| New constituency | Member of Parliament for Altrincham and Sale West; 1997–2024 | Succeeded by Connor Rand |
Political offices
| Preceded by Owen Paterson | Parliamentary private secretary to the Leader of the Opposition; 2003–2004 | Succeeded by Desmond Swayne |
| Preceded by John Bercow | Shadow Minister for Europe; 2004–2007 | Succeeded by Mark Francois |
| Preceded by Sir Michael Spicer | Chairman of the 1922 Committee; 2010–2019 | Succeeded by Dame Cheryl Gillan; Sir Charles Walker; Acting |
| Preceded by Dame Cheryl Gillan; Sir Charles Walker; Acting | Chairman of the 1922 Committee; Acting; 2019–2020 | Succeeded by Himself |
| Preceded by Himself; Acting | Chairman of the 1922 Committee; 2020–2024 | Succeeded by Bob Blackman |
Orders of precedence in the United Kingdom
| Preceded by The Lord Elliott of Ballinamallard | Gentlemen; Baron Brady of Altrincham | Followed by The Lord Sharma |
