= Young Britons' Foundation =

British conservative organization

- Abbreviation: YBF
- Formation: July 2003
- Legal status: Closed
- Location: United Kingdom
- President Chief Executive: Daniel Hannan; Donal Blaney

The Young Britons' Foundation, abbreviated to YBF, was a British conservative not-for-profit training, education and research think-tank, established in July 2003.

It promoted young conservatives and "classical liberals". The chief executive officer of the organization, Donal Blaney, described YBF as "a Conservative madrasa". YBF had strong links with the American neoconservative movements, and partnerships with American conservative think-tanks and foundations.

YBF was launched in July 2003 at a conference of the Young America's Foundation in Washington, D.C. YBF wanted to expose what it perceived to be left-wing bias in British universities. YBF's funding came from private donations.

On 21 December 2015 The Times reported that Donal Blaney had resigned as chief executive, following on from the allegations of bullying towards former YBF director of outreach Mark Clarke. The YBF closed down not long after.

== Staff ==
YBF's chief executive was Donal Blaney, a former national chairman of Conservative Future, and its chairman was Patrick Nicholls, former Conservative MP for Teignbridge and government minister. The president of YBF was Daniel Hannan, then Conservative Member of the European Parliament for South East England. The author and long-standing Eurosceptic Frederick Forsyth was also a patron of YBF.

As of September 2010, YBF's "advisory board" included Matthew Elliott, founder of the UK TaxPayers' Alliance, and representatives of The Heritage Foundation, a Washington, D.C.–based conservative think tank, the Competitive Enterprise Institute and American Conservative Union, a U.S. conservative lobbying organisation. It also included the founder of the Leadership Institute, the president of the Jesse Helms Center, the president of the Young America's Foundation, the co-founder of the Henry Jackson Society and a former executive director of the Collegiate Network. British representatives included Professor Patrick Minford, blogger Iain Dale, who resigned in the same year, and two local councillors. Liam Fox, the shadow defence secretary, was a member of the YBF's parliamentary council. Conor Burns was the vice-president of YBF before becoming an MP in 2010 .

Donal Blaney stated that the Young Britons' Foundation was largely funded by himself, at a cost of about £50,000 per year.

== Training ==
In 2010, The Guardian reported that there was "an informal understanding that YBF is the main provider of training for young Conservative activists." in 2010, Conservative Party Chairman Eric Pickles, Shadow Home Affairs Minister Andrew Rosindell and Shadow Defence Secretary Liam Fox spoke at the annual YBF Parliamentary Rally at the House of Commons. In 2010, it was reported that YBF claimed to have trained 2,500 Conservative party activists. At least 11 Conservative parliamentary candidates in the 2010 general election have been delegates or speakers at YBF courses.

Training costs were subsidised and cost about £45 for students, including accommodation and meals. Training and conferences were carried out under Chatham House Rule.

== Campaigning ==
Hung Parliament warning leaflet delivered in the week of the 2010 General Election

In the last days of the 2010 United Kingdom general election over 500,000 leaflets were delivered by the YBF to over 20 LibDem/Conservative marginals across the country warning of the dangers of a hung parliament.

During the 2008 presidential election, YBF sent a delegation of activists to campaign in the United States for John McCain. In 2010, YBF's executive director addressed the US Conservative Political Action Conference "warning of the dangers of socialism".

In the 2013 elections to the Common Council of the City of London the YBF ran around 20 candidates challenging the City establishment.

The 2015 YBF conference was cancelled after allegations of bullying towards former YBF director of outreach Mark Clarke. Six Cabinet ministers due to speak at the conference had previously withdrawn, citing diary clashes.
