= Theodore Constantine, Baron Constantine of Stanmore =

The Right Honourable The Lord Constantine of Stanmore CBE AE DL

Member of the House of Lords
- Lord Temporal
- Life peerage 21 July 1981 – 13 February 2004

Personal details
- Born: 15 March 1910
- Died: 13 February 2004 (aged 93)

Theodore Constantine, Baron Constantine of Stanmore CBE AE DL (15 March 1910 – 13 February 2004) was a British businessman and Conservative political activist who served as both the Chairman and the President of the National Union of Conservative and Unionist Associations.

Born to a tobacco importer of Greek origin, Constantine was educated at Acton College. During World War II, he served with the Royal Auxiliary Air Force as a plotter at Fighter Command's headquarters at Bentley Priory; he was awarded the Air Efficiency Award in 1945. After he was demobilized, he founded a hearing aid company that counted Sir Winston Churchill among its clients.

In 1965, Constantine was involved in a public controversy as Chairman of the Harrow East Conservative Association. The sitting Conservative MP, Anthony Courtney, had been entrapped in Moscow by the KGB in a honeypot operation. Constantine urged Courtney to step down, but the latter refused; when Courtney was re-adopted as the Conservative candidate, Constantine resigned from the constituency party's executive. Courtney subsequently lost the seat in the 1966 general election, as Constantine had predicted. Courtney later successfully sued Constantine for slander, and was awarded £200 in damages.

He served as the Chairmen of National Union of Conservative and Unionist Associations during 1967-8 and its President from 1980–1.

Constantine was appointed CBE in 1956, knighted in 1964, and made a Deputy Lieutenant for Greater London in 1967. He served as High Sheriff of Greater London in 1967. He was made a life peer in the 1981 Birthday Honours and the Letters Patent were issued on 21 July 1981, giving his style and title as Baron Constantine of Stanmore, of Stanmore in Greater London.
