= Mark Clarke (politician) =

British former politician (born 1977)

- Born: 15 June 1977 (age 49); Isleworth, Hounslow, London, England
- Education: Durham University
- Occupations: Marketing consultant; political activist
- Political party: Conservative (formerly)
- Movement: Conservative Future; Young Britons' Foundation
- Spouse: Sarah Clarke
- Awards: Golden Dolphin (Young Britons' Foundation, 2015)

Mark Clarke (born 15 June 1977) is a British former Conservative Party parliamentary candidate who was director of the now-defunct Young Britons' Foundation, as well as a chairman of (also now-defunct) Conservative Future, and ex-director of the Road Trip electioneering organisation (disbanded in 2015) that bussed Conservative party activists to marginal seats during the 2015 general election campaign. Clarke was suspended from the party on 24 September 2015, following the suicide of Conservative activist Elliott Johnson who had claimed that Clarke had bullied him.

A series of accusations subsequently appeared in national newspapers about Clarke's alleged misconduct. In November 2015 he was expelled and banned for life from representing or joining the Conservative Party. His alleged misconduct within the Conservative Party also led to national newspaper coverage about the extent to which senior figures in the party knew about complaints regarding his actions that subsequently led to the resignation of Grant Shapps as a government minister.

== Early life and education ==
Clarke was born in June 1977, the son of Madeline Clarke and Denis Ogden. He is a great nephew of Dominica's first female prime minister, Dame Mary Eugenia Charles, and a grandson of Bertie Clarke, a Barbados-born member of the West Indies Cricket Team. Bertie Clarke came to Britain in 1939 to play cricket against England, but could not return home because of the outbreak of World War II; he then trained as a general practitioner, and had a daughter, Madeline, who would become Mark's mother. Mark's parents, Denis and Madeline, split up when Mark was young. He has described his father as being absent. His upbringing included time on the Ivybridge estate in Isleworth, Hounslow, West London.

Clarke was schooled at London's Dulwich College after achieving a government assisted places position. Afterwards, he studied Ancient and Modern History at Durham University, graduating in 1999.

== Career ==
=== History Storytime Podcast ===
Facing issues with conventional employment as a result of public image and perception, Clarke, who himself studied ancient and modern history at Durham, started a children's history podcast behind the veil of his two daughters, Sophie and Ellie (with Clarke credited as "Daddy"). Mark Clarke is listed as the only director for the business. History Storytime was launched in 2018, following the sexual harassment case made against him at previous employer Unilever earlier in the year, but the limited company was dissolved on 5 April 2022.

=== Marketing consultancy ===
In the years from his graduation up to 2015, Clarke used his university training to engage in consulting positions related to marketing, a period that included work with Procter and Gamble, Mars, Accenture, and Unilever, and a period of 4 years residence in Switzerland. In 2015, he was reported to be a senior marketing analyst at Unilever, but left the company in March 2018 after claims of sexual harassment were made against him. He was the subject of a formal investigation by Unilever, but resigned before the investigation was concluded.

=== Early political career ===
Clarke has been an active Conservative Party campaigner since at least 1997 where he was seen in John Major's entourage as the former prime minister gave his speech to concede defeat to Tony Blair after a landslide defeat. He would later become the elected chairman of Conservative Future between 2006 and 2008, and he also came to prominence in the Young Britons' Foundation as their director of outreach, an organisation headed by Donal Blaney at the time.

He would also assume the nickname "Tatler Tory" after being tipped as a future Cabinet Minister by Tatler magazine.

=== 2010 General election ===
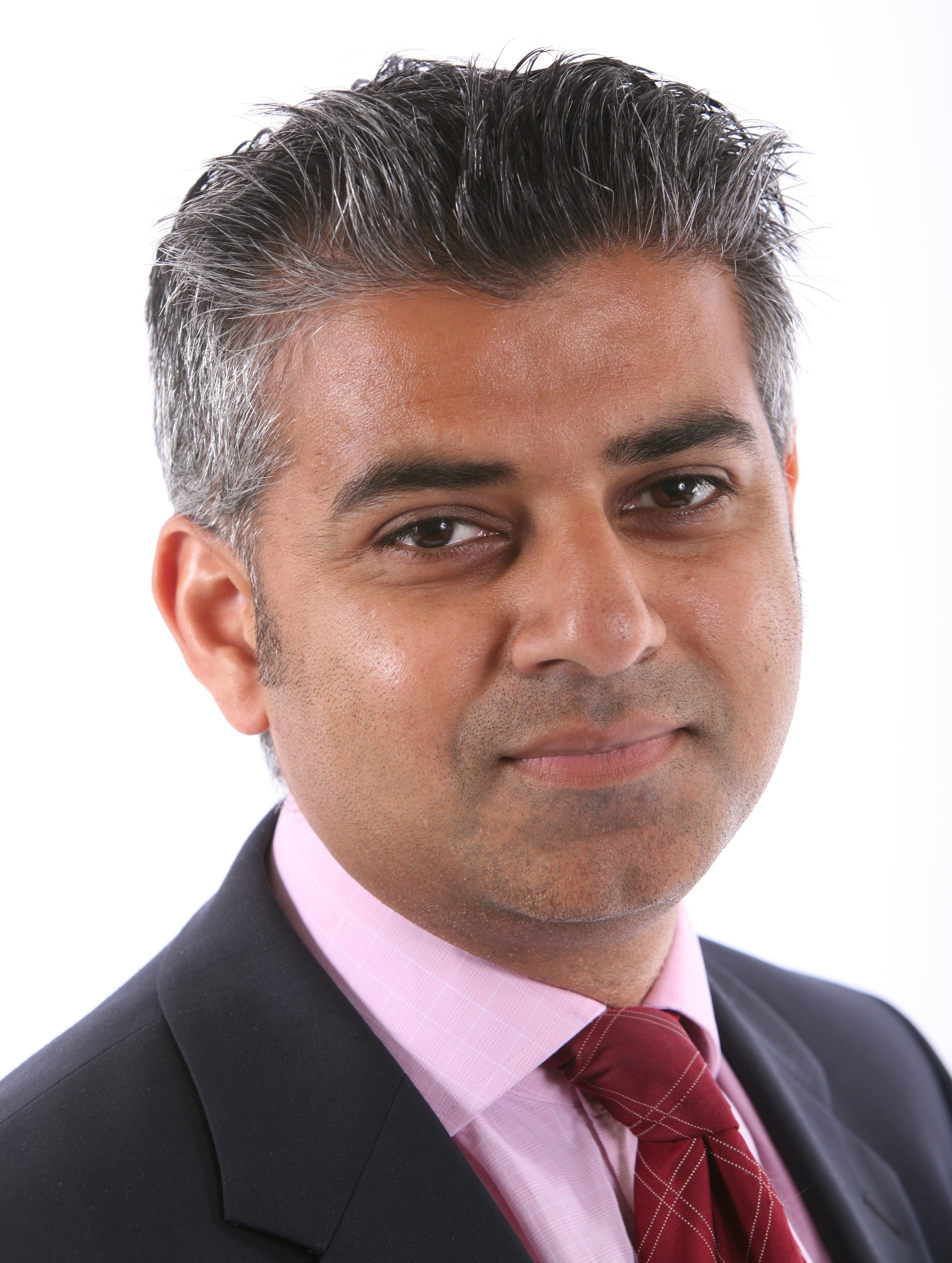
Sadiq Khan who defeated Clarke in the 2010 General Election

In 2010, Clarke stood as the Conservative Party candidate for Tooting, losing to the Labour Party candidate Sadiq Khan by 2,524 votes. During the campaign, an article in The Daily Mirror reported allegations, which Clarke denied, from Naaz Coker, chairman of St George's Healthcare NHS Trust, which said Clarke had "made 'inaccurate' and 'unfounded' claims to 'undermine' patients' confidence in their local health service." During this election campaign, it was alleged that Clarke had an affair with an MP's staff member, India Brummitt, an allegation that he denied.

=== Road Trip group ===
Clarke independently established the Road Trip campaigning group, which later received the endorsement of Conservative Campaign Headquarters and then Party Chairman Grant Shapps MP. It featured predominantly in the 2015 General Election and organised bus-loads of predominantly young party members to campaign in key marginal seats. Some local Conservatives regarded Road Trip assistance as "chaotic and useless".

When the accusations of serious misconduct during the Road Trip sessions began to appear in the national media in September 2015, Road Trip activity was suspended and later formally disbanded.

== Controversy and political scandal ==
=== Suspension of the Conservative Future National Executive Committee ===
After the suicide of Conservative Party activist Elliott Johnson, quick measures were enacted to close down the activities of organisations and people who were alleged to have failed in their duty of care of young activists or were implicated in the bullying of them. The first measure was to immediately ban some activists, including Clarke and his associate Andre Walker, from attending the annual Conservative Party Conference in 2015.

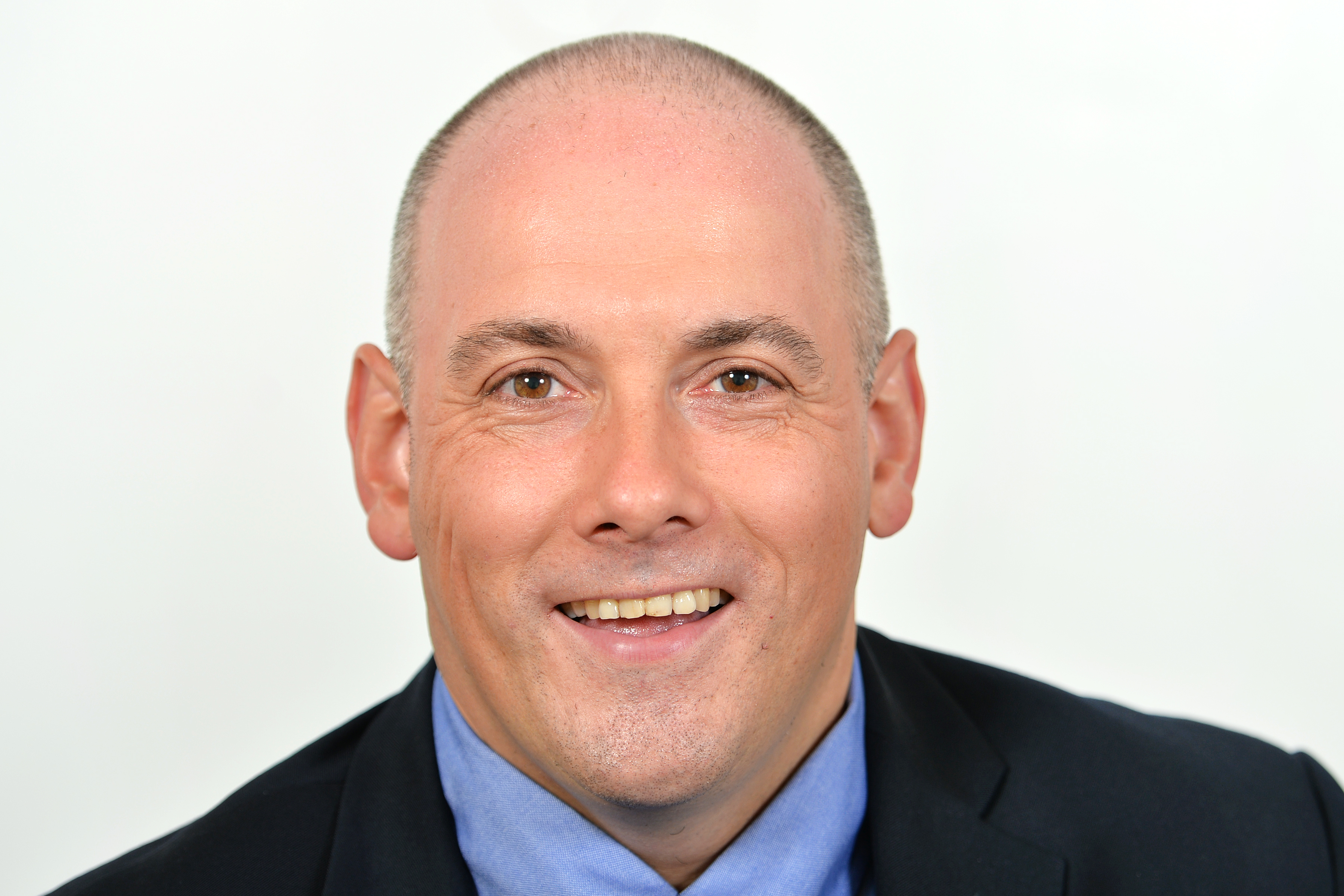
Robert Halfon MP

Further to this, it was reported on 20 November 2015 that the entire National Executive Committee of Conservative Future had been suspended over some scandals which overlapped with allegations of criminal activity occurring on Road Trip and allegedly perpetrated by Clarke. Aside from the interrelationship between Conservative Future activists and Road Trip activities, the most prominent of the allegations was that of Alexandra Paterson, the Conservative Future chairman, and her alleged affair with Robert Halfon MP. In this episode it was alleged that Clarke had orchestrated a plot to record documentary evidence of Paterson and Halfon having an affair. Halfon is reported to have discovered an attempt to blackmail him and reported the news to Downing Street. With the Tatler Tory scandal seemingly pervading into more senior ranks of the Conservative Party it was deemed that the National Executive of Conservative Future had not delivered a reasonable duty of care to its members nor acted with propriety.

The Conservative Future National Executive Committee was suspended and the Party installed Baroness Chisolm of Owlpen and Chloe Smith MP, two senior Party officials, to oversee the new governance of the organisation. One of their first actions was to write to all regional Conservative Future branches asking them to immediately cancel any social functions they had organised over the Christmas period stating that it would be improper for such events to continue.

=== Resignation of UK International Development Minister ===
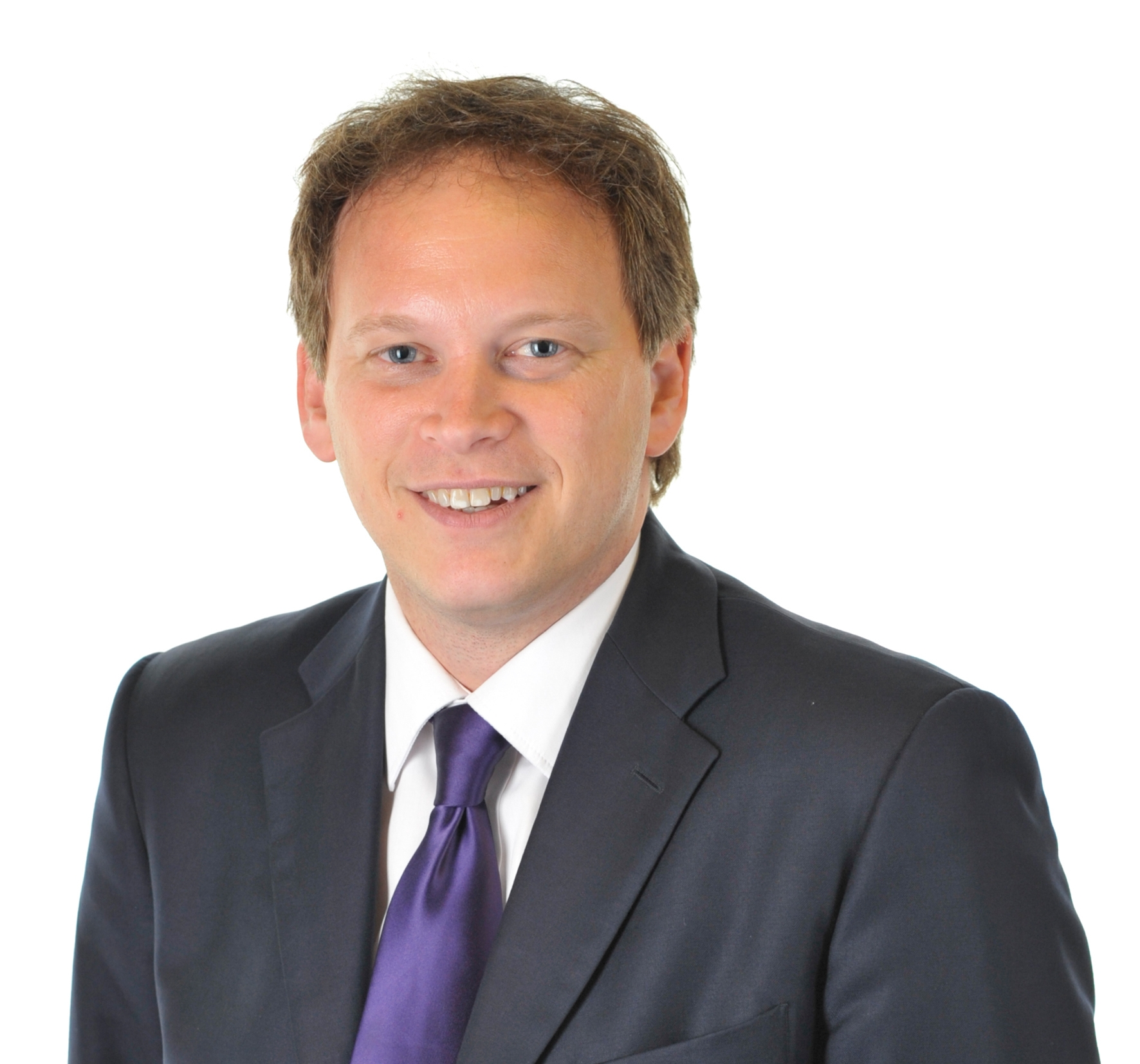
Grant Shapps MP

On 29 November 2015 Grant Shapps, who had previously held office as the co-chairman of the Conservative Party, resigned as International Development Minister over the scandal centred around Clarke's reintroduction to the Conservative Campaign Headquarters, for which he had admitted responsibility. Shapps had previously asserted that he was unaware of the seriousness of the allegations of Clarke's alleged misconduct with the youth volunteers in the Party, but his predecessor as chairman of the Conservative Party, Sayeeda Warsi, produced a letter that she had written to him making similar concerns clear and asking for him to take action to prevent Clarke's future involvement.

=== Cancellation of Young Britons' Foundation annual conference ===
On 7 December 2015 an interview was held on LBC radio between Iain Dale and Donal Blaney, the founder and head of the Young Britons' Foundation, where Blaney admitted BBC Newsnight reporters were investigating if YBF female delegates had been sexually assaulted by Clarke. Blaney, who had previously awarded Clarke YBF's most prestigious honour for upholding the principles he was taught in the foundation and for his Road Trip 2015 activity, said he regretted ever being friends with Clarke and wished he had never met him.

The YBF annual conference, which has attracted speakers from politics, but has been described as a radicalising organisation akin to a Tory madrasa by former Conservative Party leadership candidate David Davis, lost all six of its ministerial keynote speakers after the allegations of Clarke became national news. Around the same time, for reasons Blaney said were to protect the young delegates from media intrusion, the annual conference was cancelled.

=== Resignation of senior figures at Conservative Way Forward ===
On 20 December 2015 it was reported that both Donal Blaney and Paul Abbott had resigned from the Thatcherite think-tank and pressure group Conservative Way Forward, at the time of their resignations they were both chairman and chief executive respectively. A statement issued by a spokesman for Blaney denied that the resignation was related to anything other than his need to spend more time caring for his wife and concentrating on business interests in USA. Abbott was said to want a six-month break from politics.

Previous to their resignations, both Blaney and Abbott had become entangled in the Tatler Tory scandal, having received media attention and questions about their making redundant Elliott Johnson two weeks before he committed suicide; Blaney also became focus of an LBC interview with Iain Dale where his formerly close connections with Clarke were scrutinised, and his being the founder of Young Britons' Foundation which was alleged to be a radicalising force in right wing youth political training and educated some of the protagonists of the Tatler Tory scandal, including Clarke.

The Guardian newspaper quoted an unnamed source at Conservative Way Forward stating that a contributing factor to both Blaney's and Abbott's resignations was the pressure caused over Elliott Johnson's death: "My understanding is they're stepping down from those roles. I think a lot of the pressure that's been created with what happened to Elliott has put quite a bit of strain on both of them. They've both got private lives and family being caught up in the pressure of this." Paul Abbott, who was formerly the chief of staff for Grant Shapps MP, who in turn resigned on 29 November over his role in the reintroduction of Clarke into the Conservative Party, was thanked by the Johnson family for his assistance in helping them understand the circumstances around Elliott's death.

== Outcomes of official investigations into wrongdoing ==
The allegations of common assault and blackmail that faced Clarke after the death of Elliott Johnson were considered by the police, but after investigation by the Crown Prosecution Service (CPS) it was decided there was insufficient evidence to prosecute him. On 9 February 2016 a CPS spokesman said: "Having considered the evidence in accordance with the Code for Crown Prosecutors we have concluded that there is insufficient evidence to charge Mark Clarke with offences of common assault or blackmail against Elliott Johnson and we have advised that no further action be taken".

In response to this, Johnson's family said they would appeal against the CPS decision and would consider launching a private harassment case especially as harassment had not been considered by the CPS. An appeal was lodged and with publicity from The Mirror and Daily Mail it was reported on 11 February that a new case for charges of harassment against Clarke was being considered.

=== Conservative Party ban ===
On 18 November 2015, it was reported that Clarke had been expelled from the Conservative Party and given a lifetime ban. The details of the order were to ensure Clarke could never represent, or stand as candidate in any election for, the Conservative Party in his lifetime.

== Media coverage ==
Clarke's role in the foregoing matters has been examined by a number of radio and television programmes, including Newsnight.

=== Make Me A Tory ===
Clarke was a protagonist of Make Me a Tory, a 2007 Channel 4 documentary that also featured future Prime Minister David Cameron. In the documentary he was one of several prominent campaigners for the Conservative Party who sought to change the mind of the documentary maker, a lifelong Labour Party supporter.

=== Newsnight ===
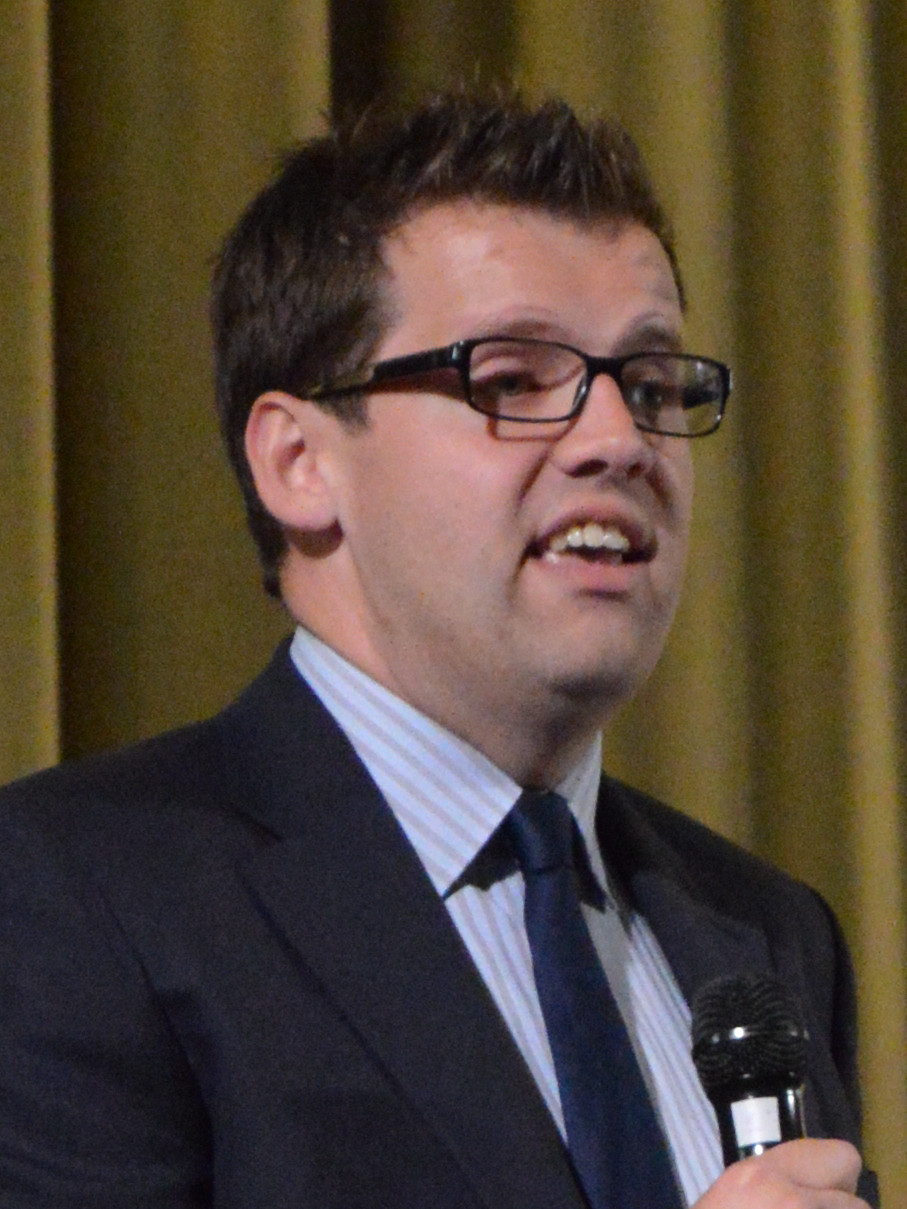
Ben Howlett MP

On 18 November 2015, Clarke was the focus of an investigative feature on BBC's flagship current affairs programme Newsnight. During the episode his contemporary, Conservative MP Ben Howlett, spoke about his personal efforts to counter institutional bullying in the youth wing of the Party.

A further Newsnight programme, aired on 8 December 2015, focused on allegations that the chairman of the Conservative Party, Lord Feldman, knew from as early as 2010 about allegations of institutional bullying in the Party's youth wing and that a twenty-page dossier was handed to him and Sayeeda Warsi by two activists naming several perpetrators, one of whom was Clarke.

=== BBC Radio 4 ===
On 29 November 2015, a special thirteen-minute profile on Clarke was aired on BBC's flagship current affairs radio channel, Radio 4. The programme was an exploration of the reasons that resignations were occurring and being sought in some of the highest offices in the Conservative Party and government; it included discussion of the then-recent resignation of the International Development Minister. The documentary also contained assertions that Clarke's political activities may well have tipped the balance of the General Election in favour of the Conservatives, but also that he had quickly become "the disappearing man of British politics" owing to the reluctance of his former associates to defend him in the press, concluding that "the former Chairman of Conservative Future now has no Future in the Conservative Party."

== Personal life ==
He was in a relationship with Conservative MP Justine Greening.
