= Conservative Future =

UK political youth movement

- President: The Baron Hague of Richmond
- Chairman: The Baroness Chisholm of Owlpen
- Founded: 1998
- Dissolved: 2016
- Succeeded by: Young Conservatives
- Headquarters: 4 Matthew Parker Street, London SW1A
- Ideology: British conservatism
- Mother party: Conservative Party
- International affiliation: International Young Democrat Union
- European affiliation: European Young Conservatives

Conservative Future (CF) was the youth movement of the Conservative Party in England, Wales, and Northern Ireland. The organisation was made up of all members of the Conservative Party who were 30 years old or younger.

Conservative Future was founded in 1998. By 2006, it was the largest political organisation on British campuses and the estimated membership, including members on campuses and through constituency associations may once have totalled 20,000.

Conservative Future Scotland was the independent sister organisation of CF in Scotland. Internationally, Conservative Future participated in the centre-right International Young Democrat Union. Within Europe, it was a founder member of the European Young Conservatives.

Conservative Future founder and former Leader of the House of Commons William Hague was announced as the Honorary President at the 2012 Conservative Party Conference in Birmingham.

It also sent delegates to the National Conservative Convention, the parliament of the party's voluntary wing (Voluntary Party). 2015 was the last year CF sent delegates to the NCC.

== History ==
Conservative Future was formed on 7 October 1998 as part of a major series of cross-party reforms introduced by then party leader William Hague. Part of the reforms including the merging of the three movements that specifically handled youth affairs within the party: the Young Conservatives, the Conservative Collegiate Forum, and the National Association of Conservative Graduates. The merger of the organisations into a single body was controversial and opposed by most members and officers of the three organisations at the time. A key change was that whereas members of the party 'opted in' to join the three organisations, under the new unified organisation membership would be automatic for all members under 20. The name 'Conservative Future' stems from the title of the party reforms 'The Fresh Future' and was only intended to be temporary. The first national chairman was the last head of Conservative Graduates, Donal Blaney, followed by Gavin Megaw, who had been the chairman of Conservative Students in its last year of existence.

At its launch, the party's national performance and dwindling activist base led to the closure of most former Young Conservative branches and student branches struggled to attract members. As formal membership records were not kept on a national database there have never been any accurate membership figures for the youth organisations before or after the creation of Conservative Future.

In 1999 Conservative Future attracted national attention following a re-branding exercise that used the slogan "CFUK", a twist on the French Connection FCUK brand. The CFUK branding was to be used on promotional material for university branches from late August to mid October 1999 but the threat of court proceedings from French Connection over breach of copyright led to Conservative Future withdrawing the promotion in early October, just before the end of the campaign.

In 2002, Conservative Future gained two positions on the national executive committee of the National Union of Students, marking their first return in seven years. This was followed up by a national tour of universities, called 'Politics Unplugged', which involved ten Shadow Cabinet members and was aimed at making politicians more approachable. CF gained further traction in 2003 and 2004, after it was announced that the party announced it would scrap university tuition fees. In 2004 alone, membership rose by 3,000, but stagnated at 15,000 members until the election of David Cameron as party leader.

Cameron's election was seen to be emblematic of a change of Conservative Future's image to 'cool', replacing the symbolism of the 'Tory Boy' stereotype of previous years. This occurred most dramatically from 2006 onwards, particularly in northern England. Described by Geordie Greig as 'counter culture', this change is ascribed to 'Saatchi-isation', named for former Party Chairman Maurice Saatchi, and ideological alignment to the so-called 'Notting Hill Set' of the party leadership.

== Controversy and closure ==
On 19 November 2015, the entire executive of the organisation was suspended, and the youth wing taken under direct control by the Conservative Party. Conservative youth materials for Freshers packs no longer feature Conservative Future branding. This followed months of newspaper speculation and eventually an exposé on Newsnight, after which the entire Executive of CF was removed, one member of which was an elected councillor in Essex.

Allegations of bullying, sexual crime and blackmail were made, centring on Mark Clarke, a [2015] executive with Unilever plc. Clarke headed both Road Trip 2015 and (2006–2008) Conservative Future. Clarke was expelled from the Conservative Party "for life" after senior members of the Conservative Party considered an internal report. Allegations against Clarke had included assertions that his behaviour had led to the suicide of a young activist and that Clarke had plotted to blackmail a Cabinet Minister, Robert Halfon MP, over an affair Halfon was conducting with another Road Trip 2015 activist and Conservative Future National Chair, 30-year-old Alexandra Paterson, a public relations employee and Ayn Rand devotee.

== Purpose ==
CF's purpose was to encourage Conservative Party values and assist in local and general elections. Conservative Future is aided in its aims by Members of Parliament (MPs) and Prospective Parliamentary Candidates (PPCs) with visits to branches. They participated in lectures, debates and many more activities. Many members of Conservative Future branches often went on to contest local and national elections, and the organisation as a whole was, by the end of its active life, increasingly turning to the internet to attract new active members.

Conservative Future also played an important role in the party's campaigning. Described as the Conservative Party's 'shock troops', CF made a major contribution to the parliamentary by-election victories in Crewe and Nantwich in 2008 and Norwich North in 2009. They were significantly more numerous, visible, and active than Labour's young supporters in the 2008 London mayoral election, in which young voters were one of the key demographics of Boris Johnson's vote. Michael Rock, Chairman of CF from 2008 to 2010, said that one of CF's virtue is being able to take part in stunts and activities that older members can't. A contingent from Conservative Future went to the United States to campaign for John McCain in the 2008 presidential election.

== Organisation ==
=== Branches ===
Conservative Future branches varied in structure. It had branches at most British universities (many of which disaffiliated with CF and are still active); others are affiliated with city and town associations and aim to attract members from the non-student population. Some branches bring together both types of organisation. Newcastle-under-Lyme and Keele University Conservative Future is an example of a hybrid university and town branch. Some County areas operate, in effect, as one large branch, so that their members have more opportunities to get involved. While some CF branches still actively exist within local Parties, most have fallen into abeyance along with CF nationally.

=== Regional College ===
The Regional College included a voting body of Regional Chairmen from across the UK who co-ordinated campaign and membership activity in their regions, and chaired their Regional Executives. It was chaired by the Regional College Chairman, who was elected by fellow Regional Chairmen to one term, and represented the Regional College on the CF National Executive. The position was first established in December 2011, when then Northern Ireland Regional Chairman, Matthew Robinson, was elected as the inaugural Regional College Chairman. The last Regional College Chairman was Chris Rowell.

The last elected Regional Chairmen (elected in 2014) were:

- North West England – Anthony Harrison
- North East England – Isaac Duffy
- Yorkshire and the Humber – Chris Rowell
- West Midlands – Kurt Ward
- East Midlands – Samuel Armstrong
- Eastern – Chantelle Whyborn
- South West England – Will Elliott
- London – Luke Springthorpe
- South East England – Theodora Dickinson
- Northern Ireland – Ben Manton
- Wales – Ryan Hunter

Non-voting members of the Regional College also included; the Northern Conservative Future Partnership Chairman and representatives from the Conservative Future Scotland National Executive.

=== Former National Chairmen ===
- Donal Blaney (1998–1999)
- Gavin Megaw (1999–2000)
- Tom Bursnall (2000)
- Hannah Parker (2001–2002)
- Justin Tomlinson (2002–2003)
- Paul Bristow (2003–2005)
- Nick Vaughan (2005–2006)
- Mark Clarke (2006–2008)
- Michael Rock (2008–2010)
- Ben Howlett (2010–2013)
- Oliver Cooper (2013–2014)
- Alexandra Paterson (2014–2015)* suspended
